= Thomas Lawrence =

English painter (1769–1830)

Sir Thomas Lawrence PRA FRS
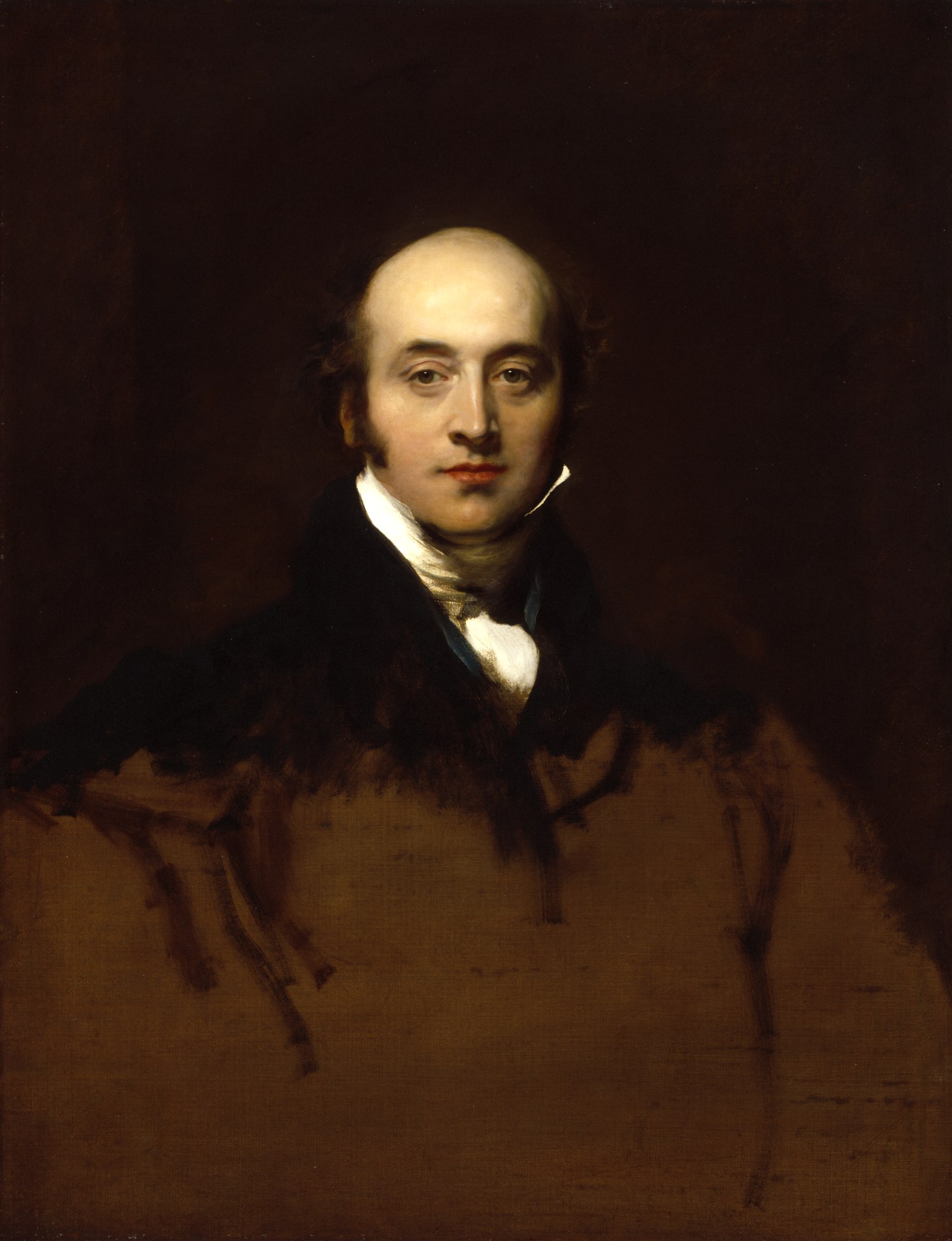
- Unfinished self-portrait, c. 1825
- Born: 13 April 1769; Bristol, England
- Died: 7 January 1830 (aged 60); London, England
- Resting place: St Paul's Cathedral
- Known for: Painting
- Movement: Romanticism

Sir Thomas Lawrence (13 April 1769 – 7 January 1830) was an English painter who served as the fourth president of the Royal Academy. A child prodigy, he was born in Bristol and began drawing in Devizes, where his father was an innkeeper at the Bear Hotel in the Market Square. At age ten, having moved to Bath, he was supporting his family with his pastel portraits.

At 18, he went to London and soon established his reputation as a portrait painter in oils, receiving his first royal commission, a portrait of Queen Charlotte, in 1789. He stayed at the top of his profession until his death, aged 60, in 1830. Self-taught, he was a brilliant draughtsman and known for his gift of capturing a likeness, as well as his virtuoso handling of paint. He became an associate of the Royal Academy in 1791, a full member in 1794, and president in 1820.

In 1810, he acquired the generous patronage of the Prince Regent, was sent abroad to paint portraits of allied leaders for the Waterloo Chamber at Windsor Castle, and is particularly remembered as the Romantic portraitist of the Regency. Lawrence's love affairs were not happy (his tortuous relationships with Sally and Maria Siddons were the subjects of several books) and, in spite of his success, he spent most of his life deep in debt and never married. At his death, he was the most fashionable portrait painter in Europe. His reputation waned during Victorian times, but has since been partially restored.

== Biography ==
=== Childhood and early career ===
Lawrence was born at 6 Redcross Street, Bristol, the youngest surviving child of Thomas Lawrence, a supervisor of excise, and Lucy Read, a clergyman's daughter from Tenbury Wells in Worcestershire. They had 16 children, but only five survived infancy: Lawrence's brother Andrew became a clergyman; William had a career in the army; and sisters Lucy and Anne married a solicitor and a clergyman (Lawrence's nephews included Andrew Bloxam). Soon after Thomas was born, his father decided to become an innkeeper and took over the White Lion Inn and next-door American Coffee House in Broad Street, Bristol. But the venture did not prosper, and in 1773 Lawrence senior removed his family from Bristol and took over the tenancy of the Black Bear Inn in Devizes, (Note: The Black Bear is still a hotel.) a favourite stopping place for the London gentry making their annual trip to take the waters at Bath.

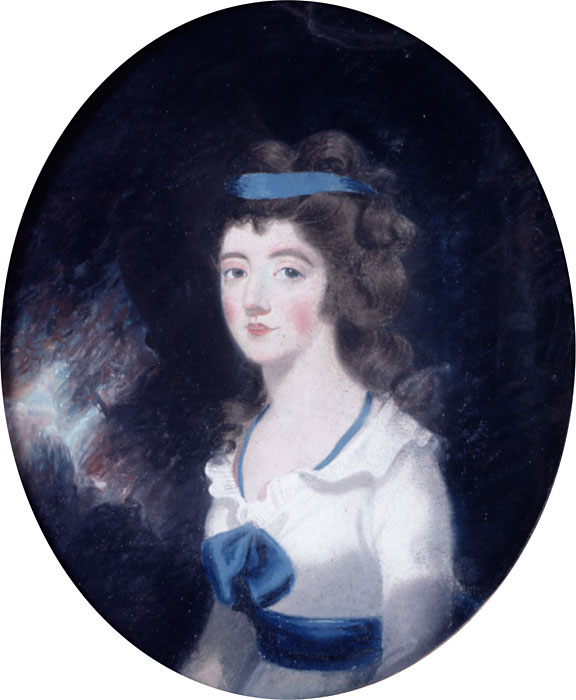
An early pastel portrait of Maria Linley

It was during the family's six-year stay at the Black Bear Inn that Lawrence senior began to make use of his son's precocious talents for drawing and reciting poetry. Visitors would be greeted with the words "Gentlemen, here's my son—will you have him recite from the poets, or take your portraits?" Among those who listened to a recitation from Tom, or Tommy as he was called, was actor David Garrick.

Lawrence's formal schooling was limited to two years at The Fort, a school in Bristol, when he was six to eight, and a little tuition in French and Latin from a dissenting minister. He also became accomplished in dancing, fencing, boxing, and billiards. By age ten his fame had spread sufficiently for him to receive a mention in Daines Barrington's Miscellanies as "without the most distant instruction from anyone, capable of copying historical pictures in a masterly style". But once again Lawrence senior failed as a landlord; in 1779, he was declared bankrupt and the family moved to Bath. From this point on, Lawrence supported his parents with his portrait work.

The family settled at 2 Alfred Street in Bath, and the young Lawrence established himself as a portraitist in pastels. His oval portraits, for which he was soon charging three guineas, were about 12 inches by 10 inches (30 by 25 centimetres), and usually portrayed a half-length. His sitters included Georgiana Cavendish, Duchess of Devonshire, Sarah Siddons, Sir Henry Harpur (of Calke Abbey, Derbyshire, who offered to send Lawrence to Italy, but Lawrence senior refused to part with his son), Warren Hastings, and Sir Elijah Impey. Talented, charming and attractive (and surprisingly modest) Lawrence was popular with Bath residents and visitors. Artists William Hoare and Mary Hartley gave him encouragement. Wealthy people allowed him to study their collections of paintings, and Lawrence's drawing of a copy of Raphael's Transfiguration was awarded a silver-gilt palette and a prize of 5 guineas by the Society of Arts in London.

=== "Always in love and always in debt" ===
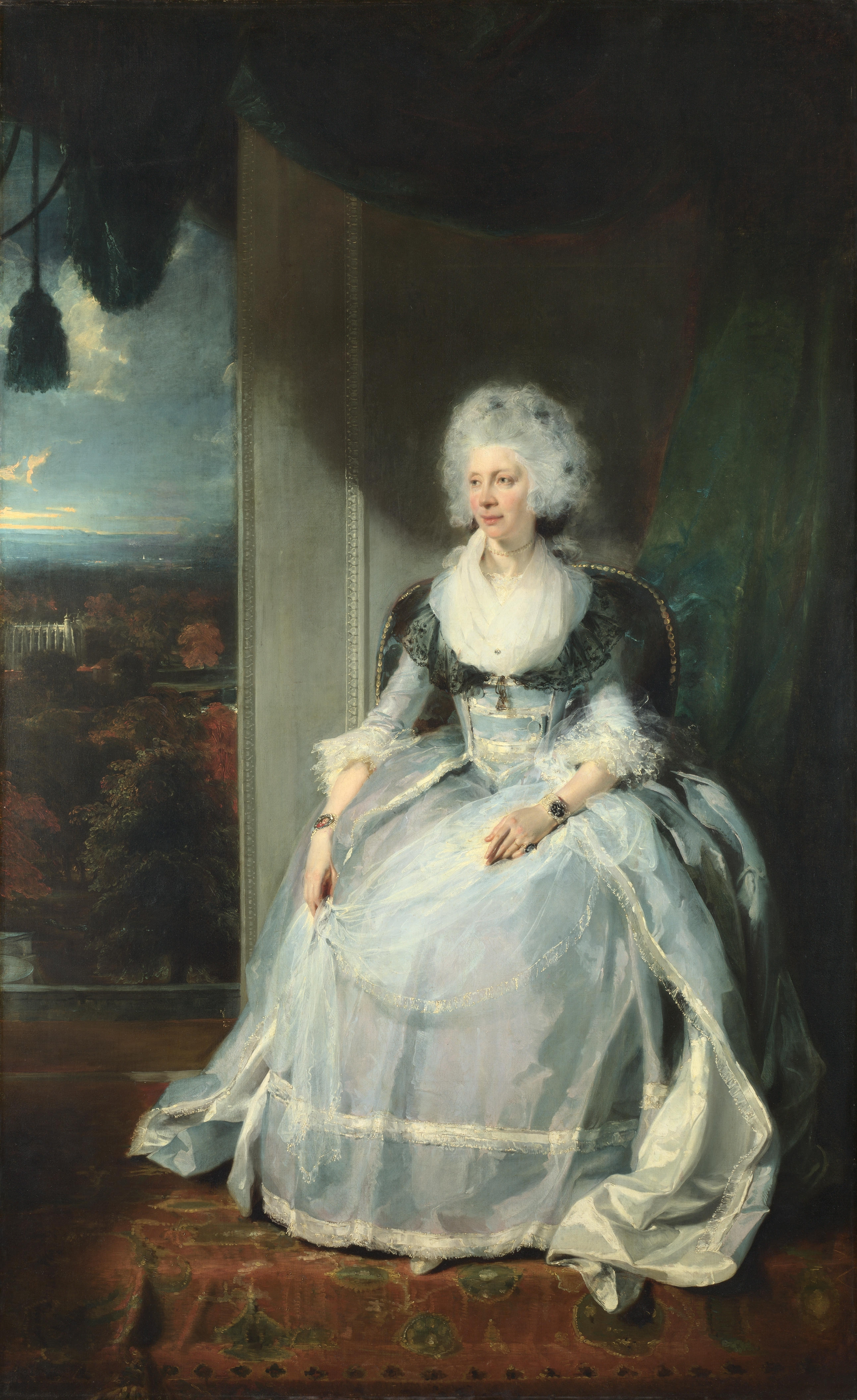
Portrait of Queen Charlotte (1789). Lawrence's first royal commission: Queen Charlotte, wife of George III

Sometime before his eighteenth birthday in 1787, Lawrence arrived in London, taking lodgings in Leicester Square, near to Sir Joshua Reynolds' studio. He was introduced to Reynolds, who advised him to study nature rather than the Old Masters. Lawrence set up a studio at 41 Jermyn Street and installed his parents in a house in Greek Street. He exhibited several works in the 1787 Royal Academy exhibition at Somerset House, and enrolled as a student at the Royal Academy but did not stay long, abandoning the drawing of classical statues to concentrate on his portraiture.

At the Royal Academy exhibition of 1788, he was represented by five portraits in pastels and one in oils, a medium he quickly mastered. Between 1787 and his death in 1830 he missed only two of the annual exhibitions: in 1809, protesting how his paintings had been displayed; and in 1819, because he was abroad. In 1789 he exhibited 13 portraits, mostly in oil, including one of William Linley and one of Lady Cremorne, his first attempt at a full-length portrait. They received favourable comments in the press, with one critic referring to him as "the Sir Joshua of futurity not far off". Aged just 20, Lawrence received his first royal commission, a summons arriving from Windsor Castle to paint the portraits of Queen Charlotte and Princess Amelia.

The Queen found Lawrence presumptuous (although he made a good impression on the princesses and ladies-in-waiting), and she did not like the finished portrait, which remained in Lawrence's studio until his death. When it was exhibited at the Royal Academy in 1790, however, it received critical acclaim. Also shown that year was another of Lawrence's most famous portraits, that of actress Elizabeth Farren, soon to be the Countess of Derby, "completely Elizabeth Farren: arch, spirited, elegant and engaging", according to one newspaper.

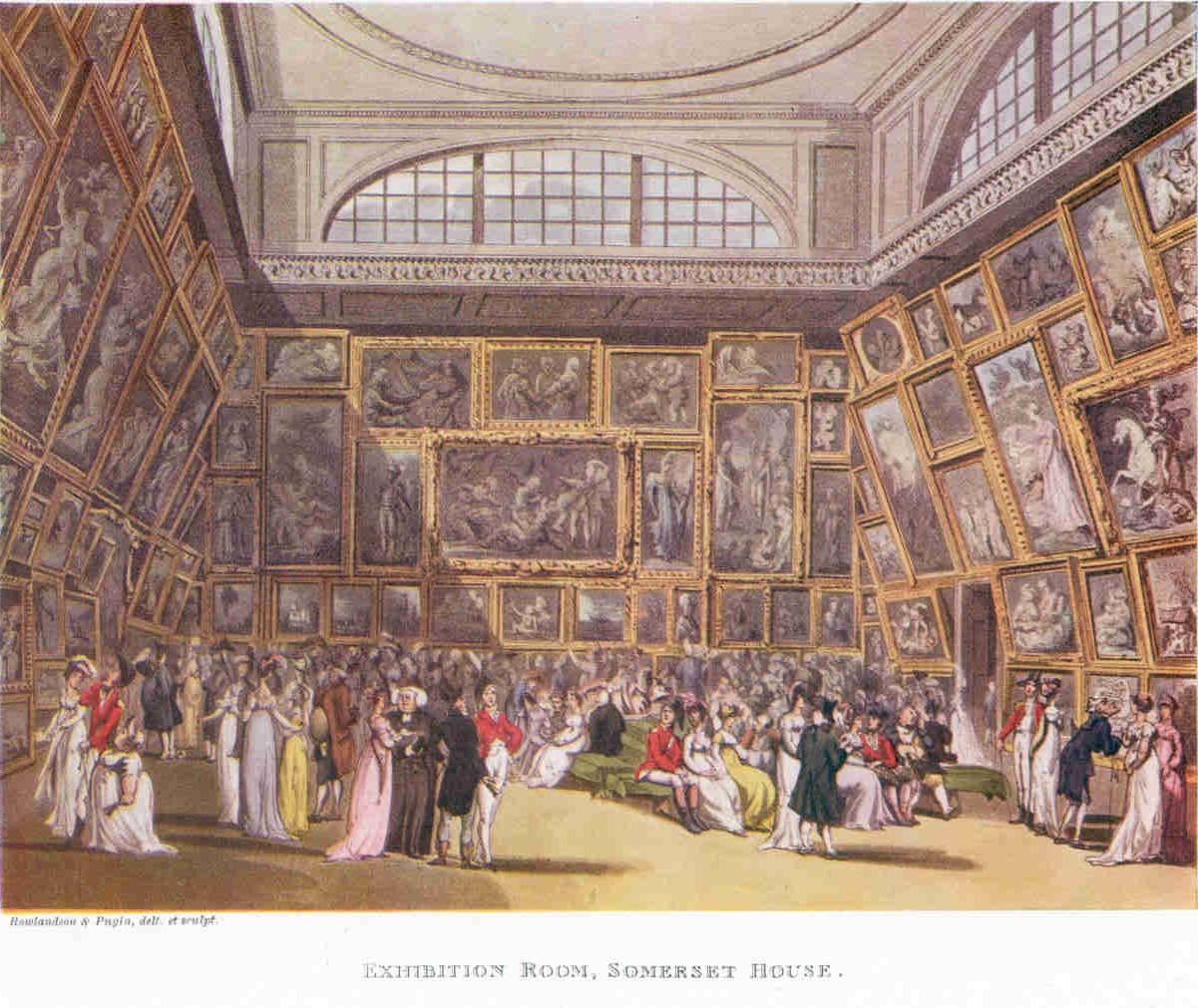
Lawrence exhibited in 40 Royal Academy annual exhibitions.

In 1791 Lawrence was elected an associate of the Royal Academy and the following year, on the death of Sir Joshua Reynolds, King George III appointed him "painter-in-ordinary to his majesty". His reputation was established, and he moved to a studio in Old Bond Street. In 1794, he became a full member of the Royal Academy.

Although commissions were pouring in, Lawrence was in financial difficulties. His debts stayed with him for the rest of his life. He narrowly avoided bankruptcy, had to be bailed out by wealthy sitters and friends, and died insolvent. Biographers have never been able to discover the source of his debts; he was a prodigiously hard worker (once referring in a letter to his portrait painting as "mill-horse business") and did not appear to have lived extravagantly. Lawrence himself said: "I have never been extravagant nor profligate in the use of money. Neither gaming, horses, curricles, expensive entertainments, nor secret sources of ruin from vulgar licentiousness have swept it from me".

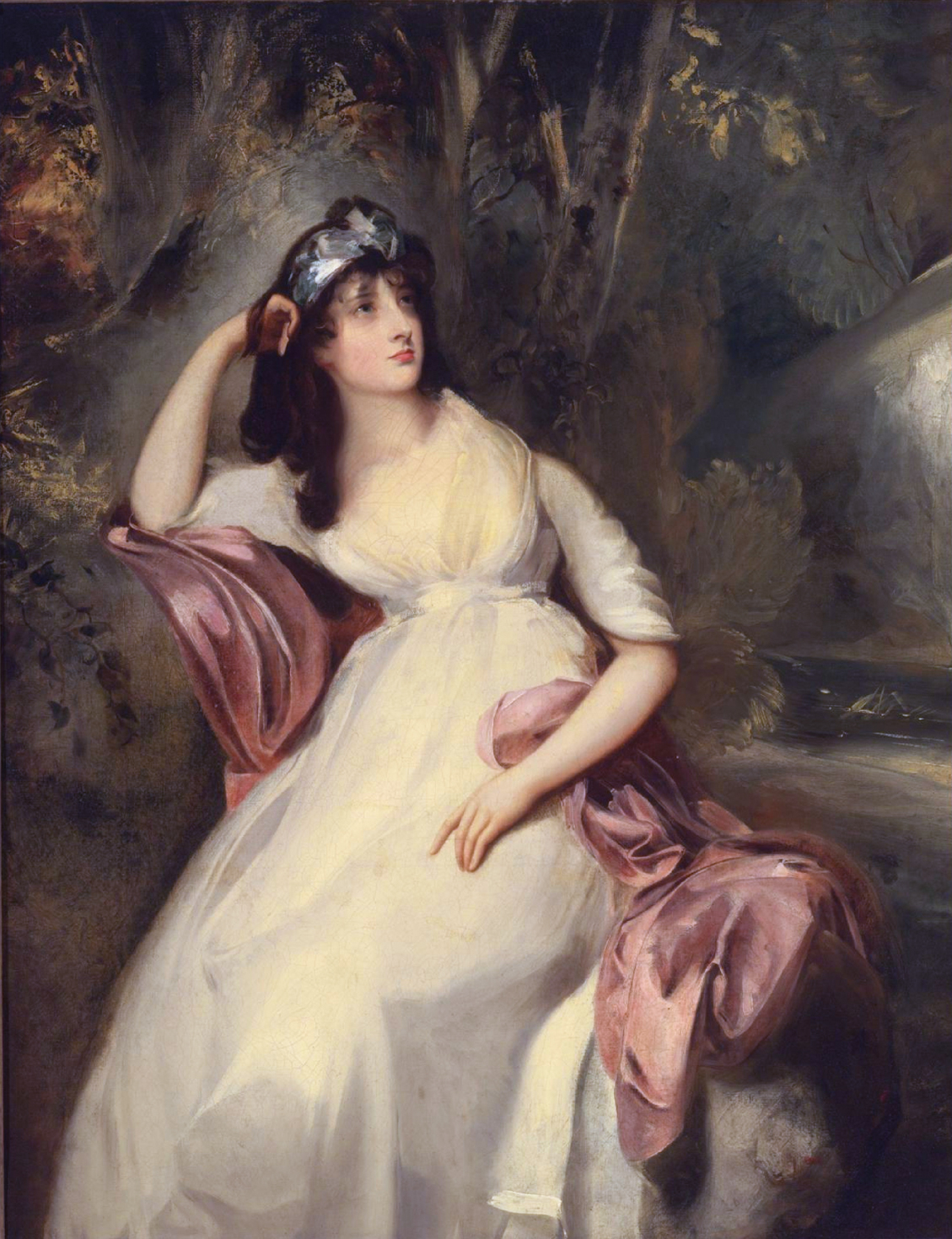
Lawrence was in love with Sarah Siddons' daughter Sally. Painting by Thomas Lawrence.

Another source of unhappiness in Lawrence's life was his romantic entanglement with two of Sarah Siddons' daughters. He fell in love first with Sally, then transferred his affections to her sister Maria, then broke up with Maria and turned to Sally again. Both sisters had fragile health; Maria died in 1798, on her deathbed, extracting a promise from her sister never to marry Lawrence. Sally kept her promise and refused to see Lawrence again; she died in 1803. Lawrence continued on friendly terms with their mother and painted several portraits of her. He never married. In later years, two women provided him with companionship — friends Elizabeth Croft and Isabella Wolff, who met Lawrence when she sat for her portrait in 1803. Isabella was married to Danish consul Jens Wolff, but she separated from him in 1810. Sir Michael Levey suggests that people may have wondered if Lawrence was the father of her son Herman.

Lawrence's departures from portraiture were very rare. In the early 1790s, he completed two history pictures: Homer Reciting his Poems, a small picture of the poet in a pastoral setting; and Satan summoning his legions, a giant canvas illustrating lines from John Milton's Paradise Lost. Boxer John Jackson posed for the naked body of Satan; the face is that of Sarah Siddons' brother, John Philip Kemble.

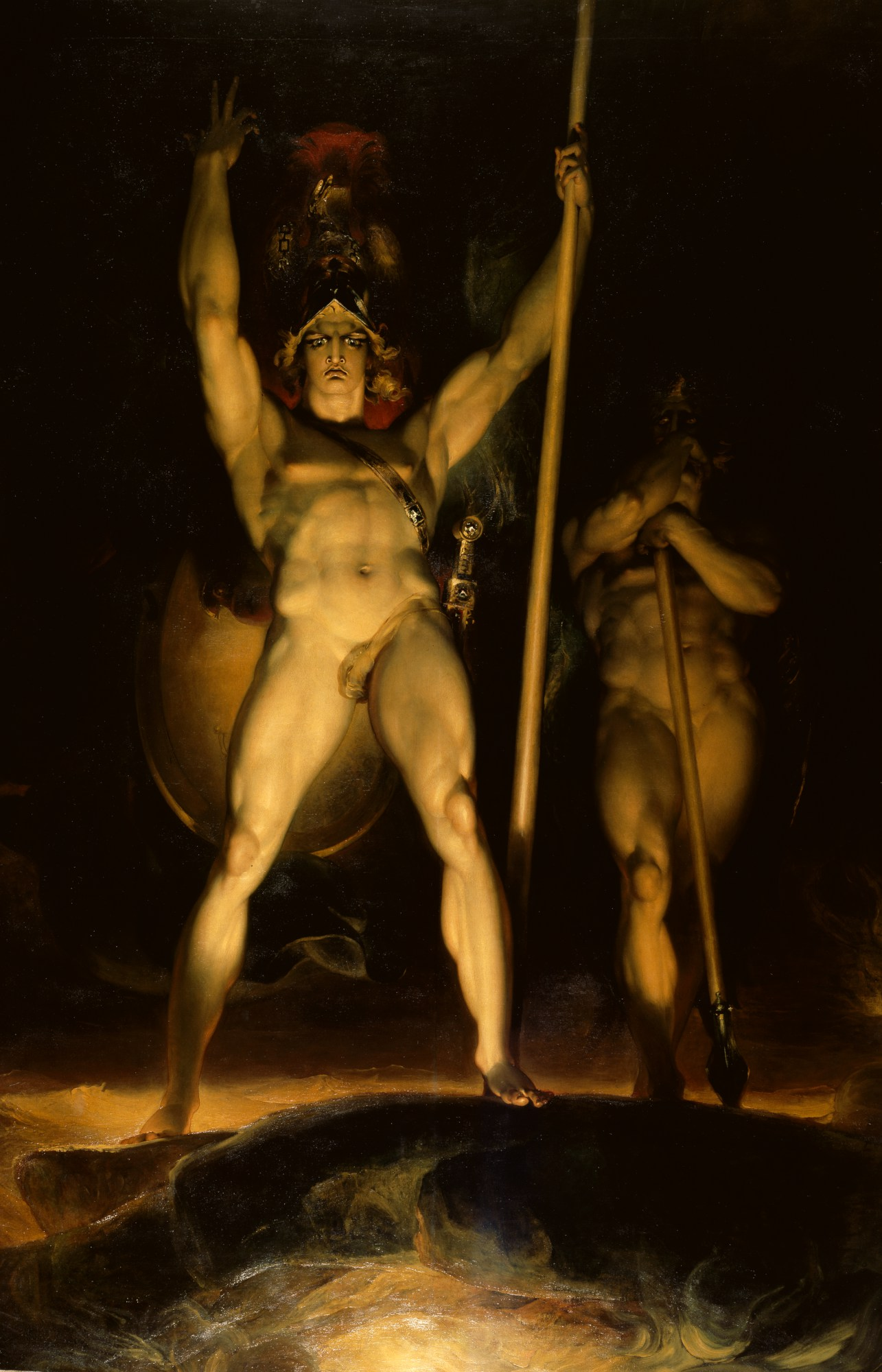
Satan summoning his Legions, 1796–1797

Lawrence's parents died within a few months of each other in 1797. He gave up his house in Piccadilly, where he had moved from Old Bond Street, to set up his studio in the family home in Greek Street. By now, to keep up with the demand for replicas of his portraits, he was using studio assistants, including Samuel Lane from 1802 until Lawrence's death almost twenty years later, and most notable William Etty and George Henry Harlow.

The early years of the 19th century saw Lawrence's portrait practice continue to flourish. Amongst his sitters were major political figures such as Henry Dundas, 1st Viscount Melville and William Lamb, 2nd Viscount Melbourne, whose wife Lady Caroline Lamb he also painted. The King commissioned portraits of his daughter-in-law Caroline, the estranged wife of the Prince of Wales; and his granddaughter Charlotte. Lawrence stayed at Montagu House, the princess's residence in Blackheath, while he was painting the portraits and thus became implicated in the "delicate investigation" into Caroline's morals. He swore an affidavit that although he had on occasion been alone with her, the door had never been locked or bolted and he had "not the least objection for all the world to have heard or seen what took place". Expertly defended by Spencer Perceval, he was exonerated.

=== "Pictorial chronicler of the Regency" ===
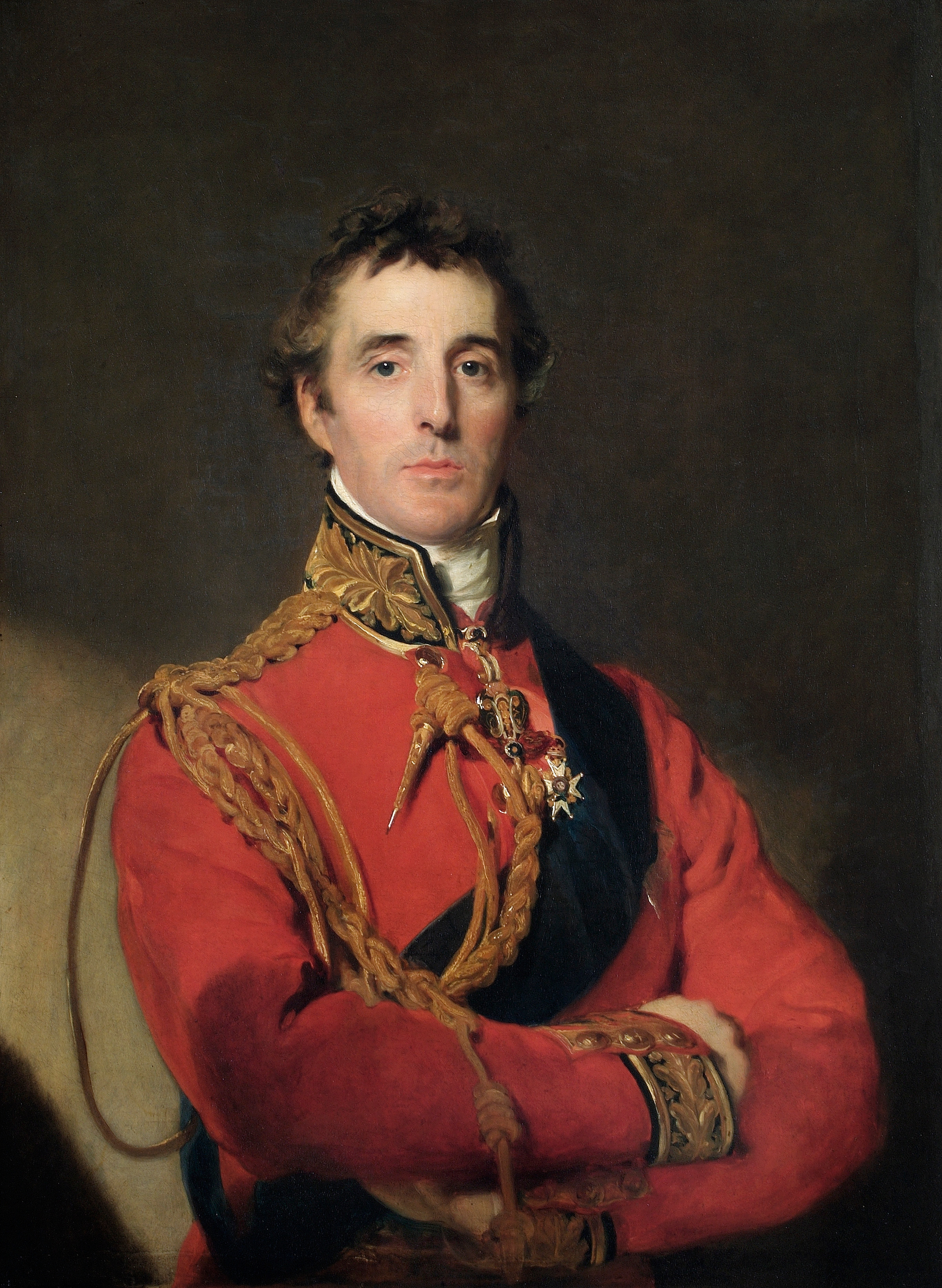
Portrait of the Duke of Wellington in 1815, later used on the Bank of England £5 note

By the time the Prince of Wales was made regent in 1811, Lawrence was acknowledged as the country's foremost portrait painter. Through one of his sitters, Lord Charles Stewart, who he painted in Hussar uniform, he met the Prince Regent, who became his most important patron. As well as portraits of himself, the prince commissioned portraits of allied leaders Arthur Wellesley, 1st Duke of Wellington, Gebhard Leberecht von Blücher, and Count Matvei Platov, who sat for Lawrence at his new house at 65 Russell Square. (The house was demolished in the early 20th century to make way for the Imperial Hotel.) The private sitting-room of Sir Thomas Lawrence shows Lawrence at 65 Russell Square, surrounded by casts of classical sculpture. The prince also had plans for Lawrence to travel abroad and paint foreign royalty and leaders, and as a preliminary he was given a knighthood on 22 April 1815. Napoleon's return from Elba put these plans on hold, although Lawrence did make a visit to Paris, where his friend Lord Charles Stewart was ambassador, and saw the art that Napoleon had looted from Italy, including Raphael's Transfiguration, the painting he had reproduced for his silver-gilt palette as a boy.

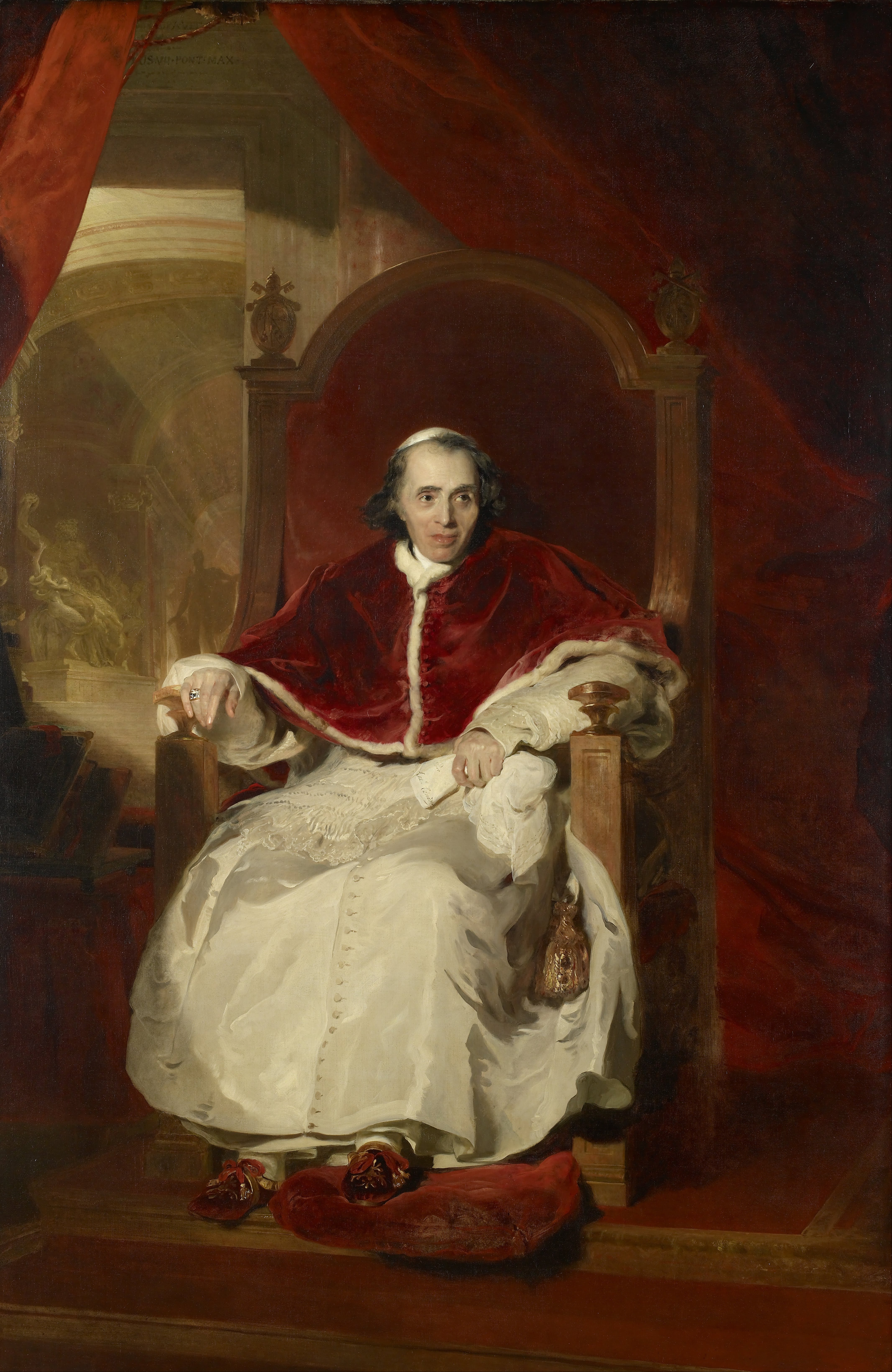
Lawrence painted a Portrait of Pope Pius VII in Rome in 1819

In 1817 the prince commissioned Lawrence to paint a portrait of his daughter Princess Charlotte, who was pregnant with her first child. Charlotte died in childbirth; Lawrence completed the portrait and presented it to her husband, Prince Leopold, at Claremont on his birthday, as agreed. The princess's obstetrician, Sir Richard Croft, who later shot himself, was the half-brother of Lawrence's friend Elizabeth Croft, and for her Lawrence drew a sketch of Croft in his coffin.

Eventually, in September 1818, Lawrence was able to make his postponed trip to the continent to paint the allied leaders, first at Aachen and then at the Congress of Vienna, for what would become the Waterloo Chamber series, housed in Windsor Castle. His sitters included Alexander I of Russia, Francis I of Austria, Frederick William III of Prussia, Karl Philipp, Prince of Schwarzenberg, Archduke Charles, Duke of Teschen and Henriette his wife, Lady Selina Caroline, wife of the Count of Clam-Martinic and a young Napoleon II, as well as various French and Prussian ministers. In May 1819, still under orders from the Prince Regent, he left Vienna for Rome to paint Pope Pius VII and Cardinal Ercole Consalvi.

=== President of the Royal Academy ===
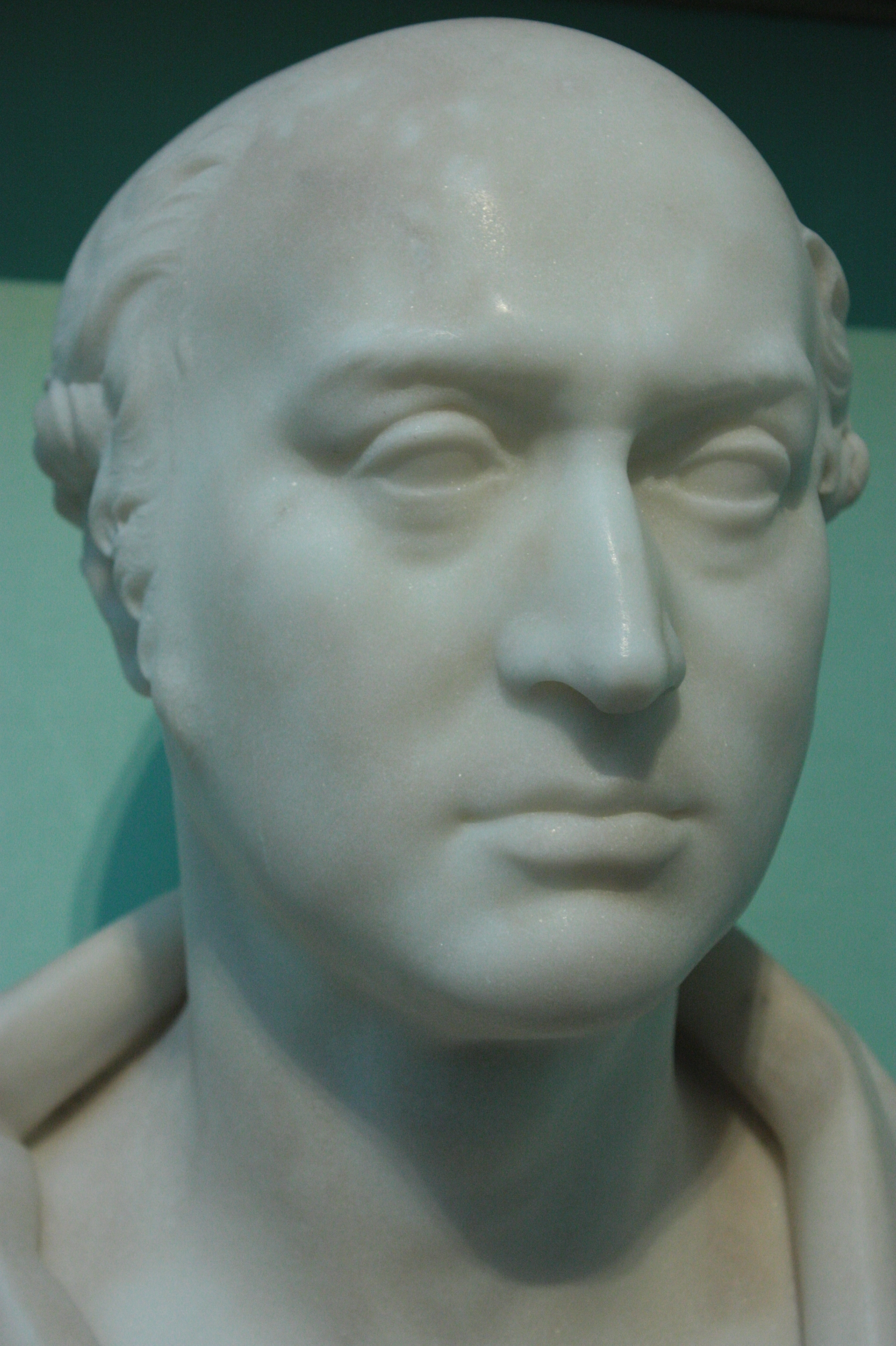
A bust of Thomas Lawrence by Edward Hodges Baily, 1830

Lawrence arrived back in London on 30 March 1820 to find that the president of the Royal Academy, Benjamin West, had died. That very evening, Lawrence was voted the new president, a position he would hold until his death 10 years later. George III had died in January; Lawrence was granted a place in the procession for the coronation of George IV. On 28 February 1822, he was elected as a Fellow of the Royal Society "for his eminence in art".

The royal commissions continued during the 1820s, including one for a portrait of the King's sister Sophia, and one of Sir Walter Scott (along with Jane Austen, one of Lawrence's favourite authors), as well as one to paint the newly crowned Charles X of France for the Waterloo series, for which Lawrence made a trip to Paris, taking Herman Wolff with him. Lawrence acquired another important patron in Robert Peel, who commissioned the painter to do portraits of his family as well a portrait of George Canning. Two of Lawrence's most famous portraits of children were painted during the 1820s: that of Emily and Laura Calmady, daughters of Charles Calmady, and that of Master Charles William Lambton, painted for his father Lord Durham for 600 guineas and known as The Red Boy. The latter portrait attracted much praise when it was exhibited in Paris in 1827. One of the artist's last commissions was of the future Prime Minister George Hamilton-Gordon, 4th Earl of Aberdeen. Fanny Kemble, a niece of Sarah Siddons, was one of his last sitters (for a drawing).

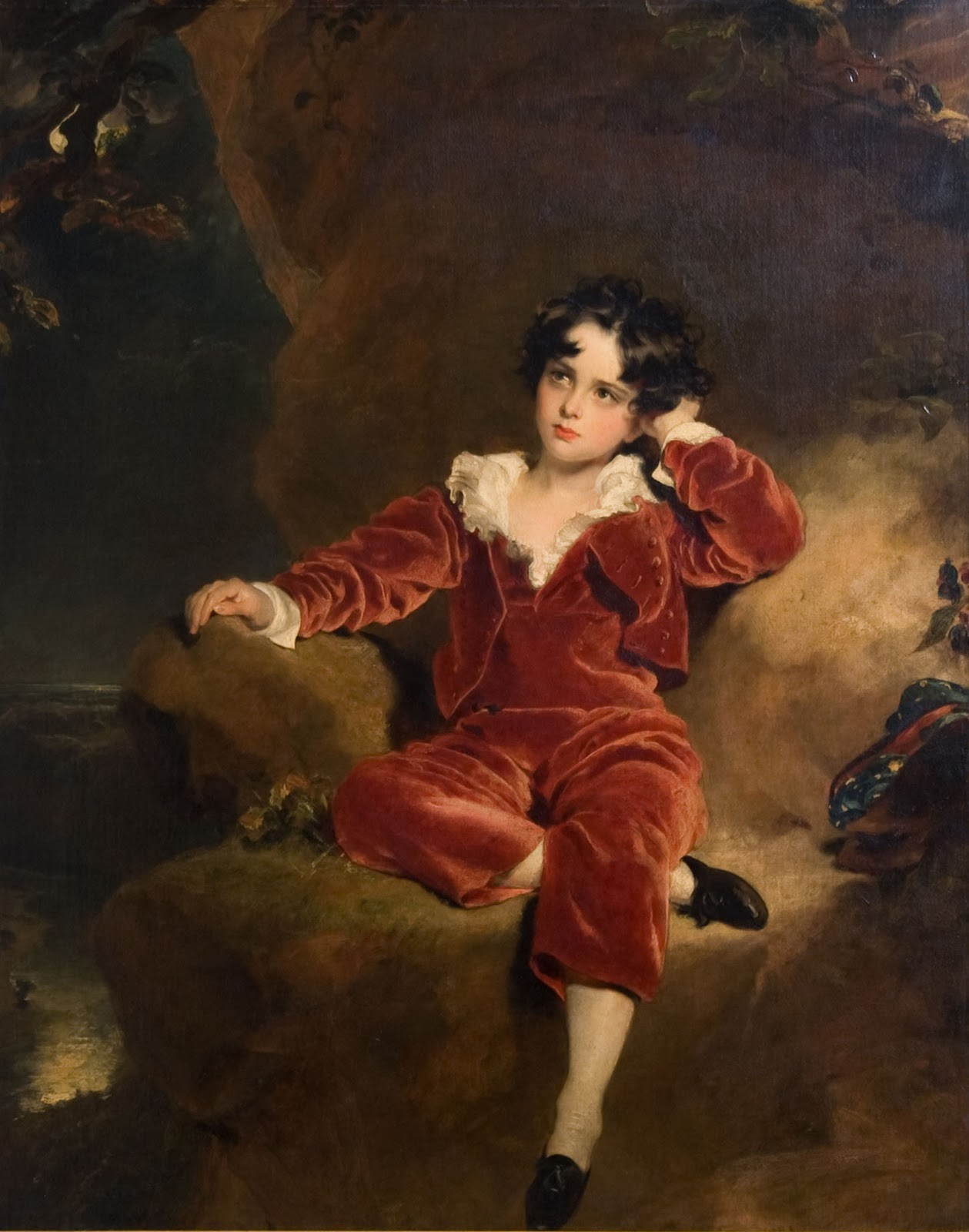
The Red Boy, a portrait of Master Lambton, eldest son of John Lambton, 1st Earl of Durham, c. 1825

Lawrence died suddenly on 7 January 1830, just months after his friend Isabella Wolff. A few days previously he had experienced chest pains but had continued working and was eagerly anticipating a stay with his sister at Rugby, when he collapsed and died during a visit from his friends Elizabeth Croft and Archibald Keightley. After a post-mortem examination, doctors concluded that the artist's death had been caused by ossification of the aorta and vessels of the heart. Lawrence's first biographer, D. E. Williams, suggested that this in itself was not enough to cause death, and it was his doctors' over-zealous bleeding and leeching that killed him. Lawrence was buried on 21 January in the crypt of St Paul's Cathedral. Amongst the mourners was J. M. W. Turner who painted a sketch of the funeral from memory. Lawrence was famed for the length of time he took to finish some of his paintings (Isabella Wolff waited twelve years for her portrait to be completed) and, at his death, his studio contained a large number of unfinished works. Some were completed by his assistants and other artists, some were sold as they were. In his will, Lawrence left instructions to offer, at a price much below their worth, his collection of Old Master drawings to first George IV, then the trustees of the British Museum, then Robert Peel and the Earl of Dudley. None of them accepted the offer and the collection was split up and auctioned; many of the drawings later found their way into the British Museum and the Ashmolean Museum. After Lawrence's creditors had been paid, there was no money left, although a memorial exhibition at the British Institution raised £3,000 which was given to his nieces.

== Legacy ==
Lawrence's friends asked Scottish poet Thomas Campbell to write the artist's biography, but he passed on the task to D.E. Williams, whose two rather inaccurate volumes were published in 1831. It was nearly 70 years later, in 1900, before another biography of Lawrence appeared by Lord Ronald Gower. In 1913, Sir Walter Armstrong, who was not a great admirer of Lawrence, published a monograph. The 1950s saw the publication of two further works: Douglas Goldring's Regency portrait painter, and Kenneth Garlick's catalogue of Lawrence's paintings (a further edition was published in 1989). Sir Michael Levey, curator of the National Portrait Gallery's 1979–80 Lawrence exhibition, produced books on the artist in 1979 and 2005. Lawrence's entanglements with the Siddons family have been the subject of three books (by Oswald Knapp, André Maurois, and Naomi Royde-Smith) and a recent radio play.

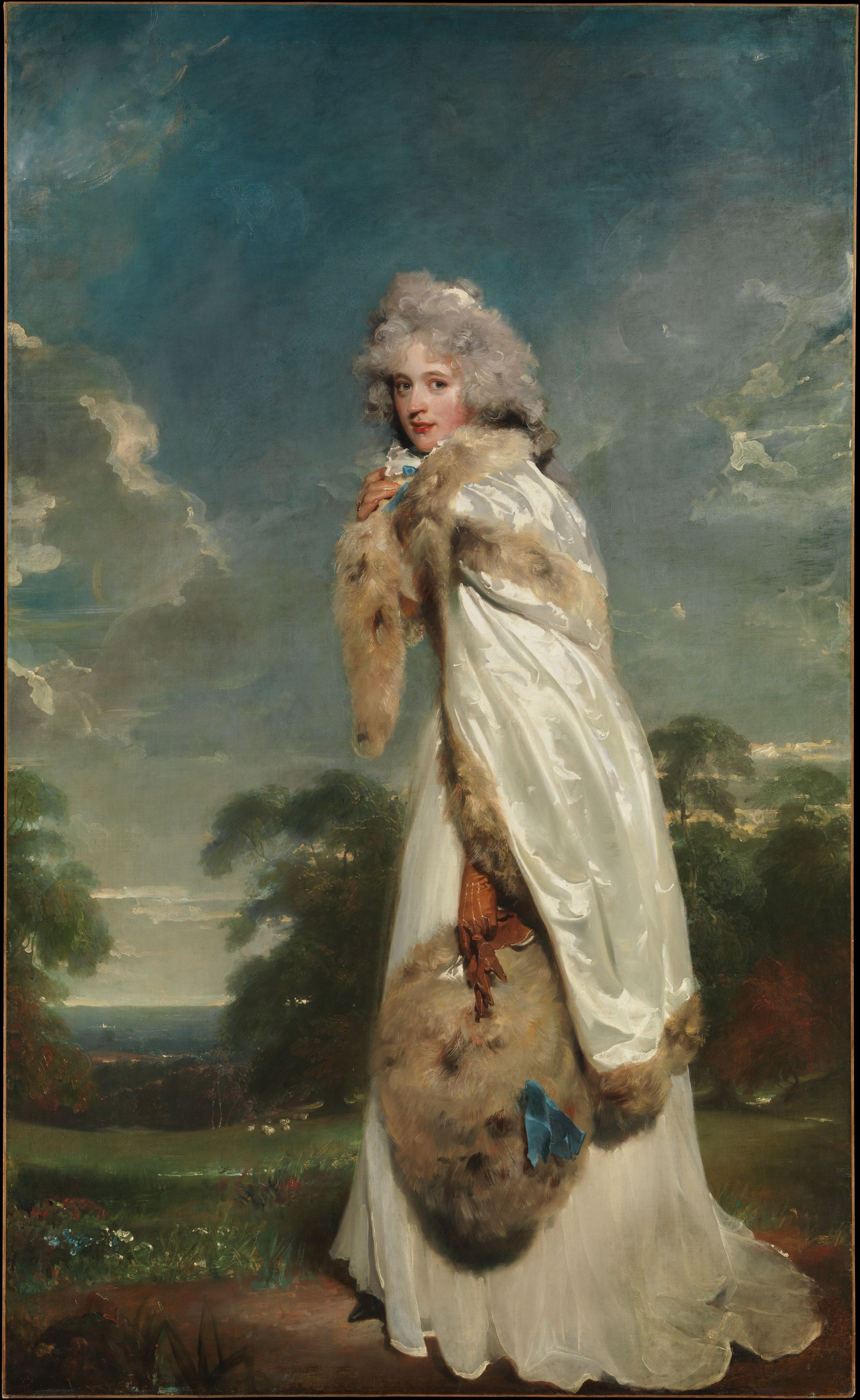
Elizabeth Farren's portrait, c. 1790, went to the United States.

Lawrence's reputation as an artist fell during the Victorian era. Critic and artist Roger Fry did something to restore it in the 1930s, when he described Lawrence as having a "consummate mastery over the means of artistic expression" with an "unerring hand and eye". At one time Lawrence was more popular in the United States and France than in Britain; and some of his best known portraits, including those of Elizabeth Farren, Sarah Barrett Moulton (known to her family as Pinkie) and Charles Lambton (the "Red Boy") found their way to the United States during the early-20th-century enthusiasm there for English portraits. Sir Michael Levey acknowledges that Lawrence is still dismissed by some art historians: "He was a highly original artist, quite unexpected on the English scene: self-taught, self-absorbed in perfecting his own personal style, and in effect self-destructing, since he left behind no significant followers or creative influence. Leaving aside Sargent, his sole successor has been not in painting, but in fashionable, virtuoso photography."

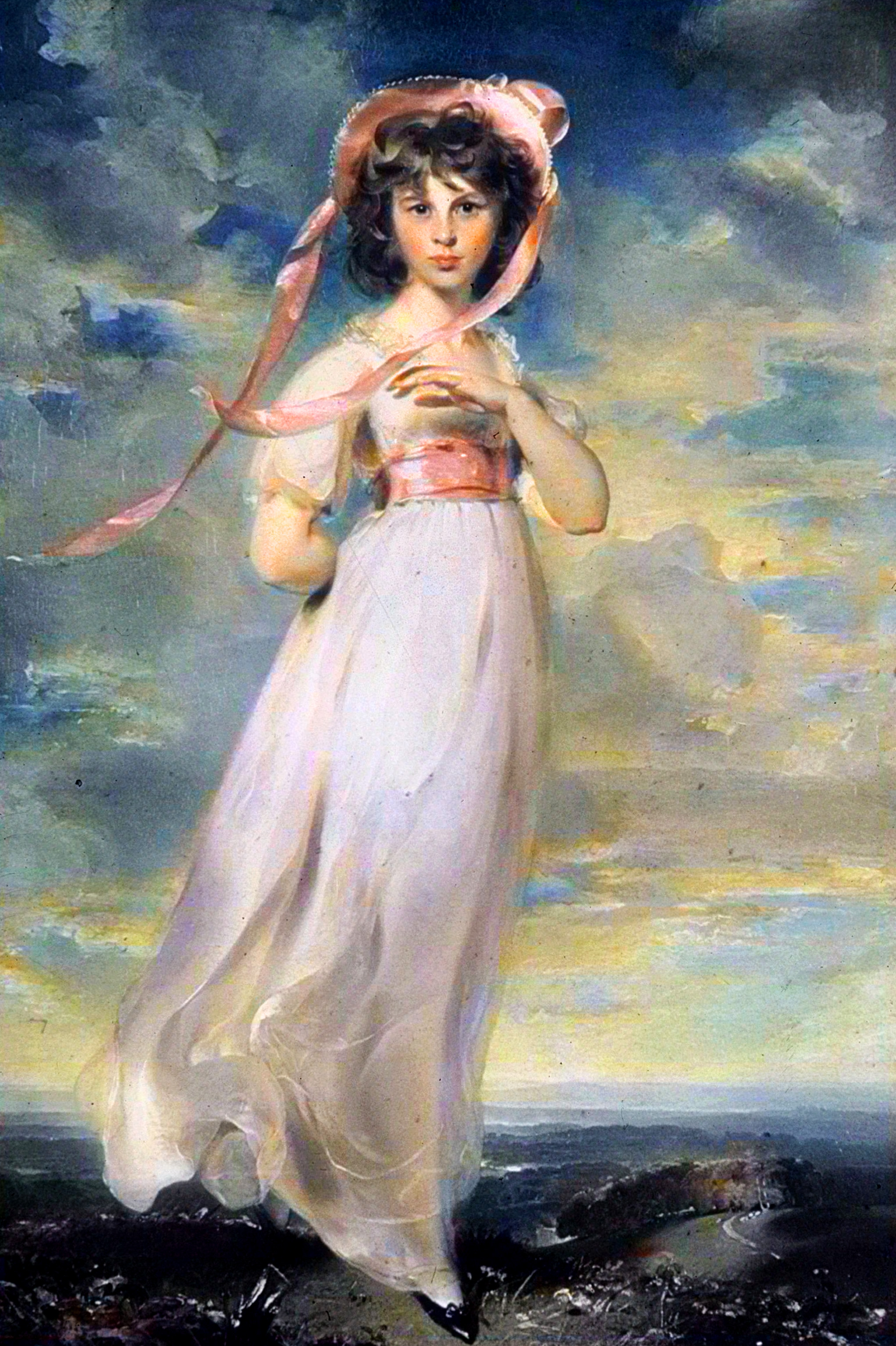
Pinkie – a portrait of Sarah Barrett Moulton, 1794

The most extensive collections of Lawrence's work can be found in the Royal Collection, and the National Portrait Gallery in London. Tate Britain, the National Gallery and the Dulwich Picture Gallery house smaller collections of his work in London. There are a few examples of his work in the Holburne Museum of Art and the Victoria Art Gallery in Bath, and in Bristol City Museum and Art Gallery. In the United States, the Huntington Library houses Pinkie, and Lawrence's portraits of Elizabeth Farren, Lady Harriet Maria Conyngham, and the Calmady children are in the Metropolitan Museum of Art. In Europe, the Musée du Louvre has a few examples of Lawrence's work, and the Vatican Pinacoteca has a swagger portrait of George IV (presented by the King himself) as almost its only British work.

In 2010 the National Portrait Gallery held a retrospective exhibition of Lawrence's work. The director of the National Portrait Gallery, Sandy Nairne, was quoted in The Guardian describing Lawrence as "…a huge figure. But a huge figure who we believe deserves a great deal more attention. He is one of the great painters of the last 250 years and one of the great stars of portraiture on a European stage." In December 2018, a portrait of Lady Selina Meade (1797–1872), who married the Count of Clam-Martinic, painted by Lawrence in Vienna in 1819, sold for £2.29 million at auction, a record for the artist.

== In literature ==
In the 1848 novel Vanity Fair, William Makepeace Thackeray refers to "...the Lawrence portraits, tawdry and beautiful, and, thirty years ago, deemed as precious as works of real genius...".

A description of Mr Tite Barnacle of the Circumlocution Office as someone who "seemed to have been sitting for his portrait to Sir Thomas Lawrence all the days of his life" is one of 25 references to art in Charles Dickens' 1857 novel Little Dorrit.

In the play An Ideal Husband by Oscar Wilde, Lord Caversham is introduced with a stage direction that describes him as "[r]ather like a portrait by Lawrence".

In the 1943 film The Man in Grey, Lawrence appears in one scene and is played by the actor Stuart Lindsell.

== Gallery ==
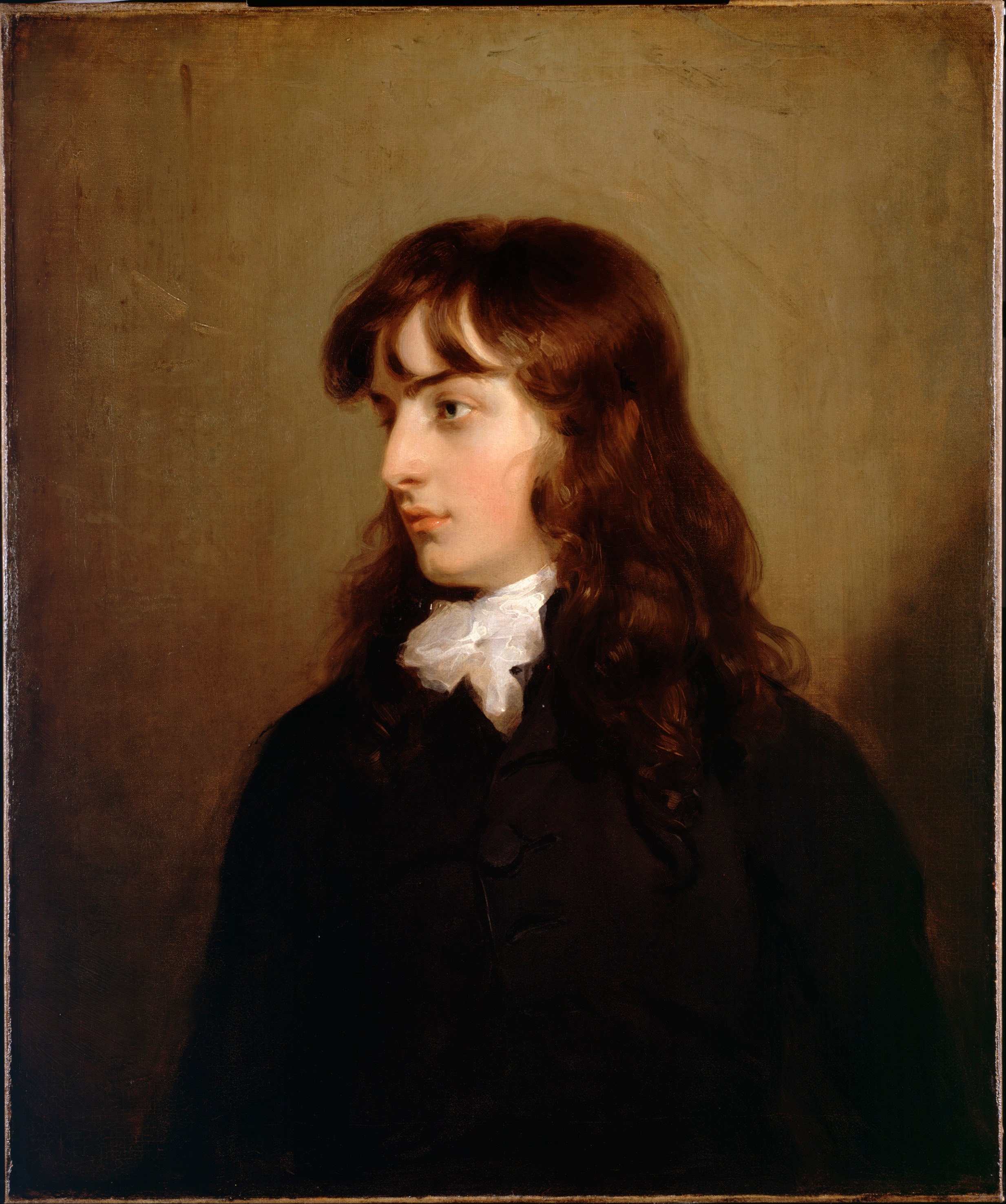
Portrait of William Linley, 1788

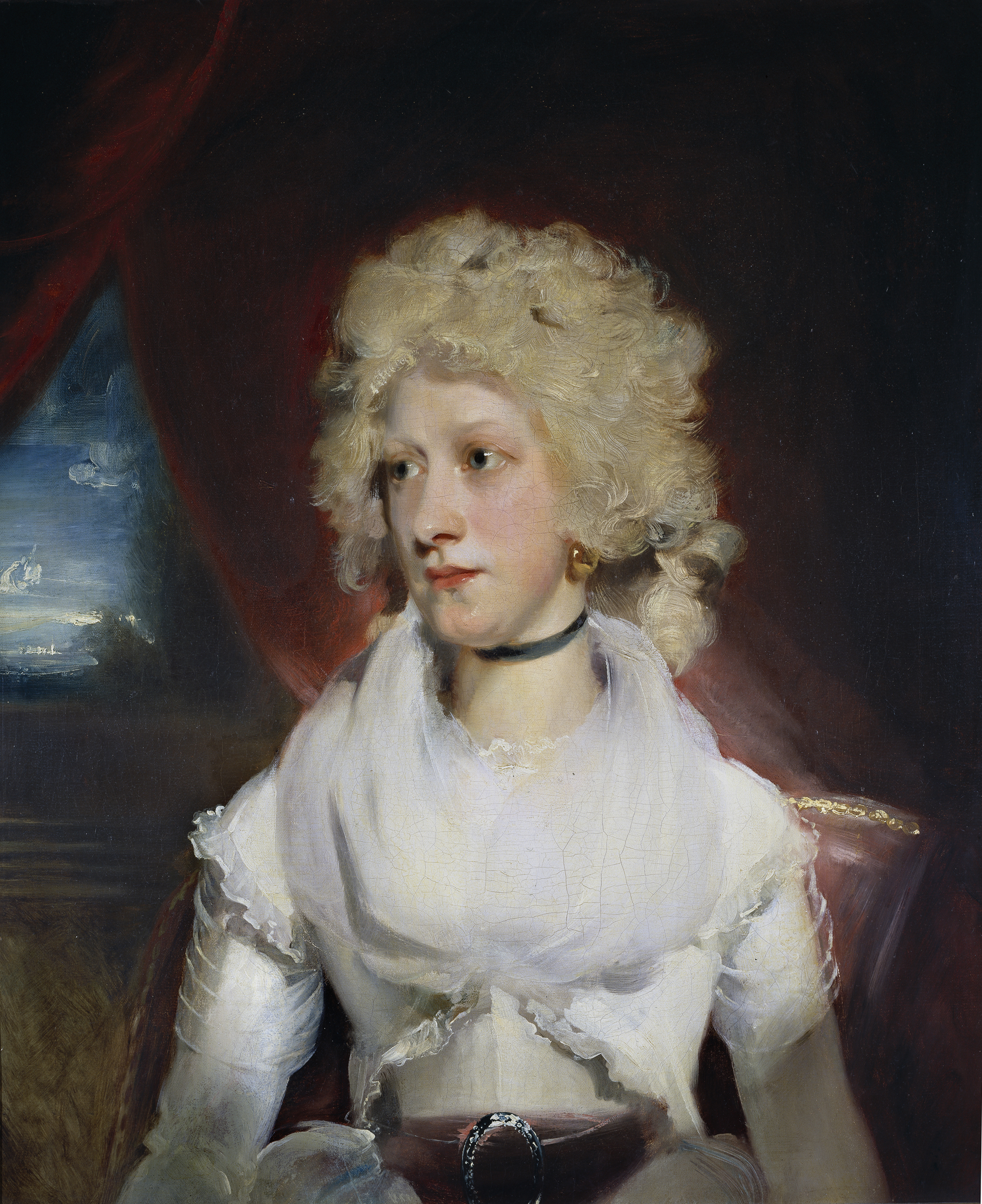
Miss Marthe Carr, c. 1789, Prado Museum, Madrid

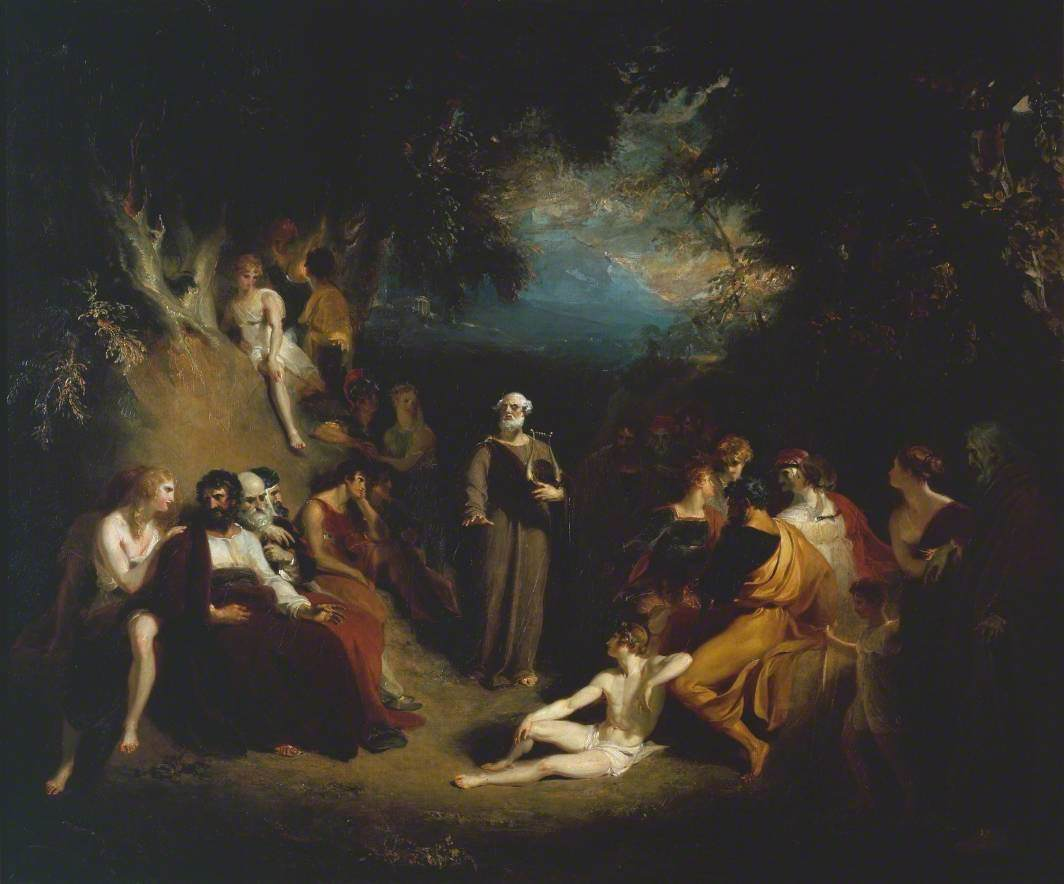
Homer Reciting his Poems, 1790

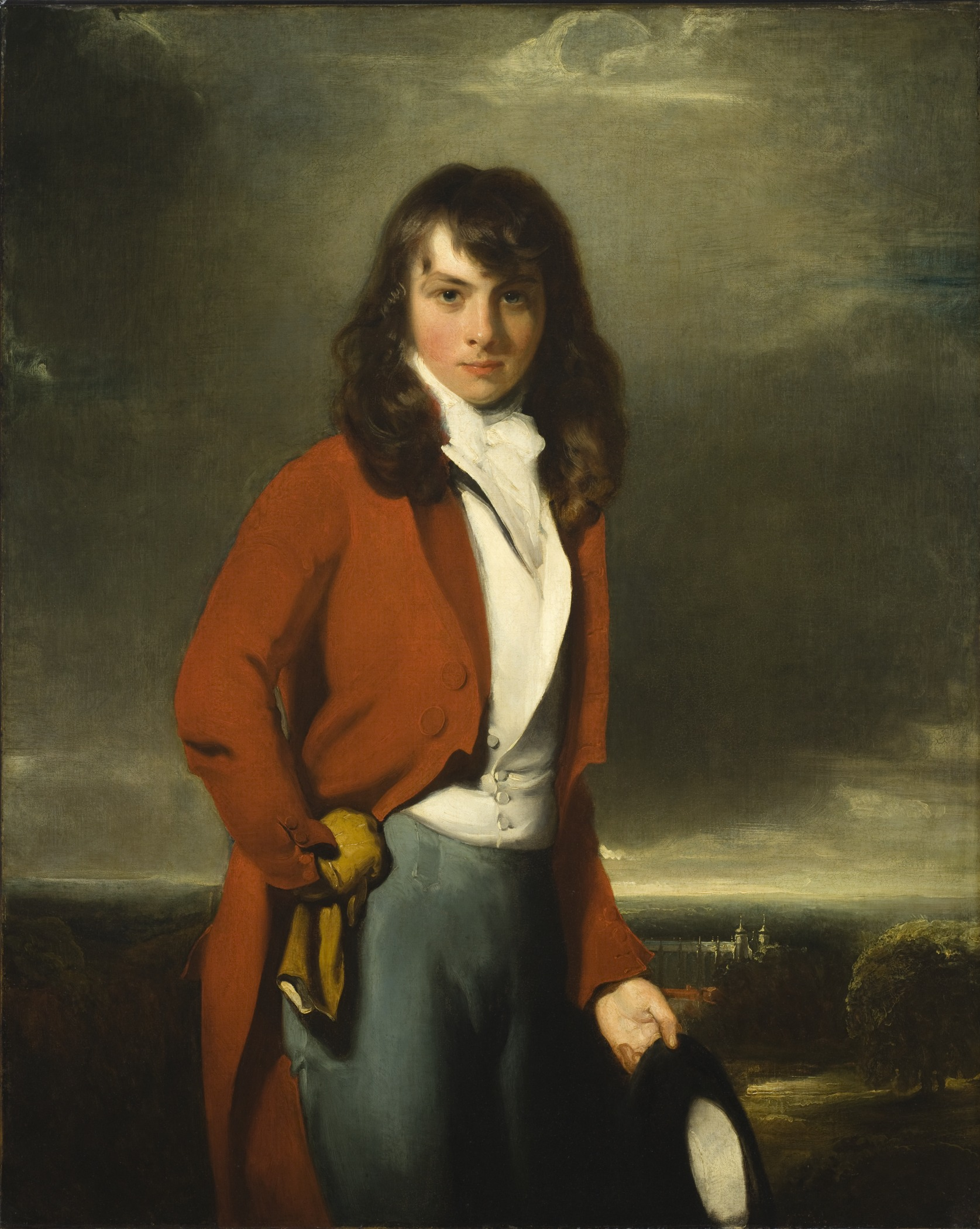
Portrait of Arthur Atherley, 1792

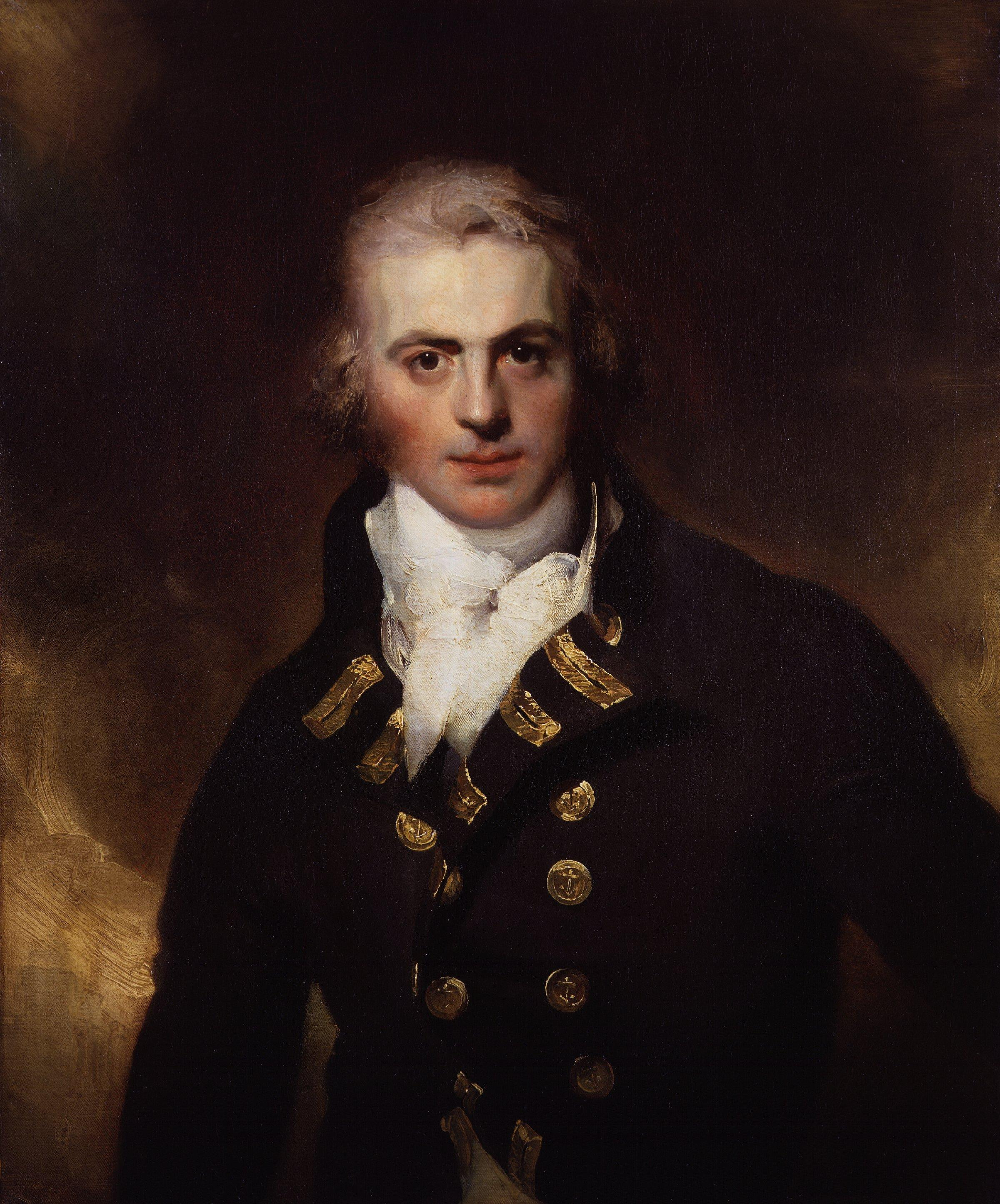
Portrait of Graham Moore 1792

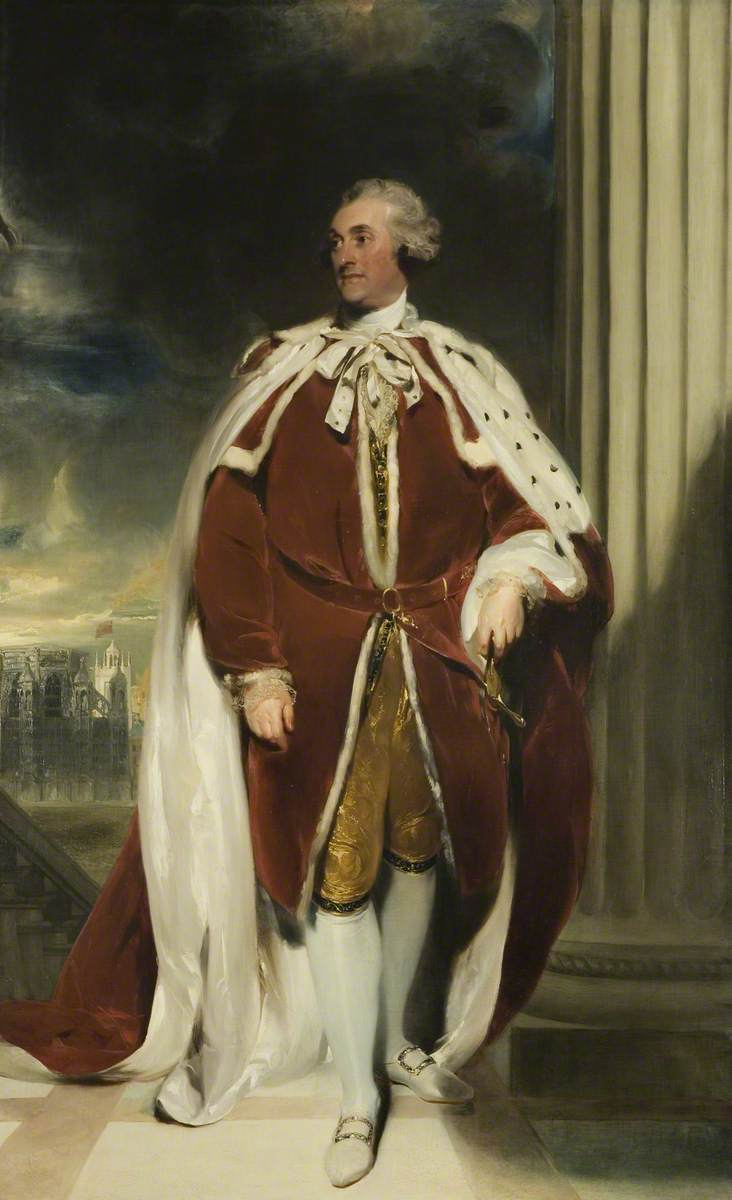
Portrait of the Duke of Portland, 1792

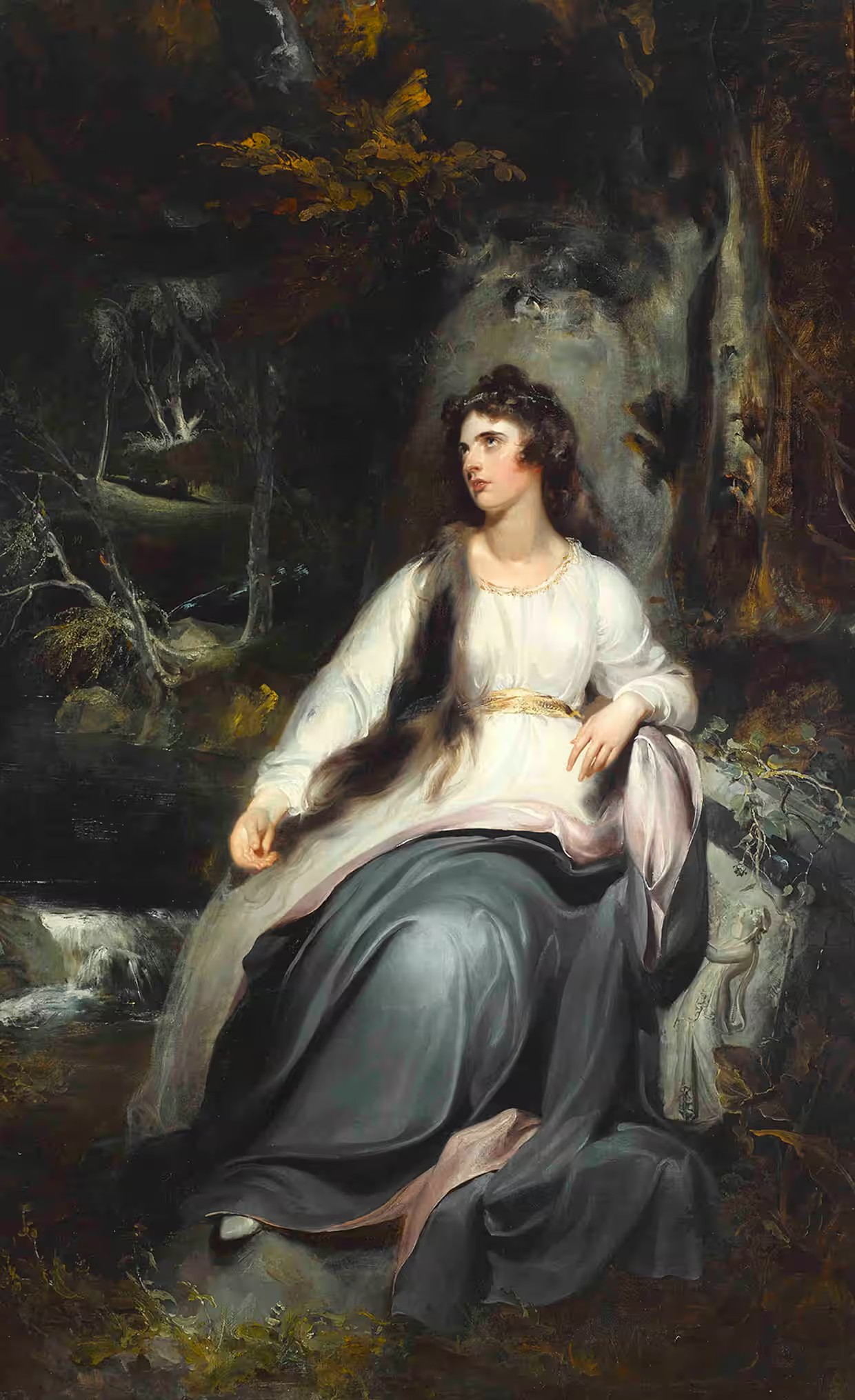
Lady Hamilton as La Penserosa, 1792

John Julius Angerstein and His Wife, 1792

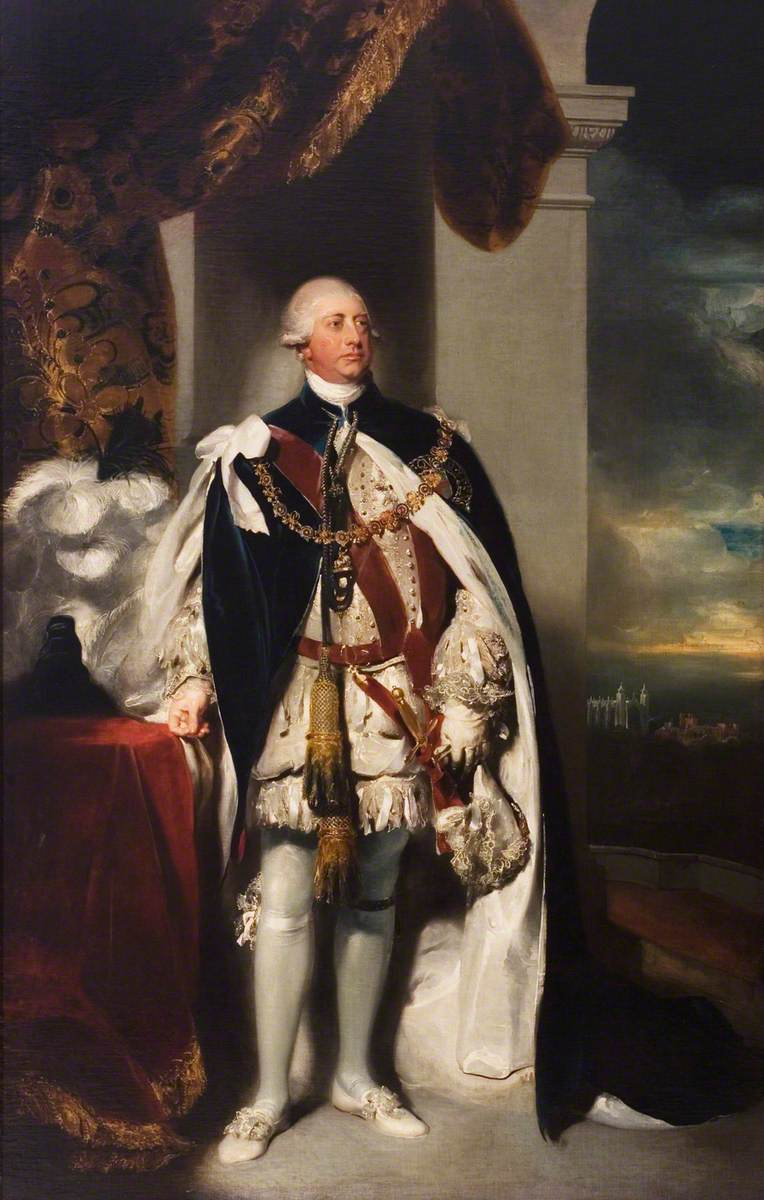
Portrait of George III, 1792

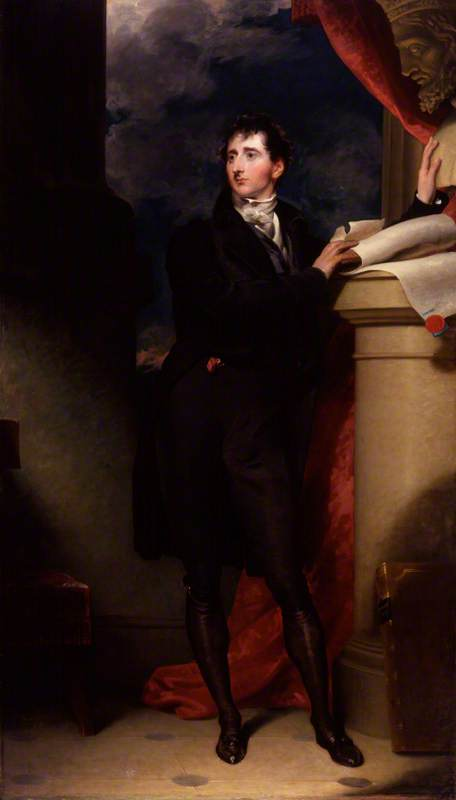
Portrait of Sir Francis Burdett, 1793

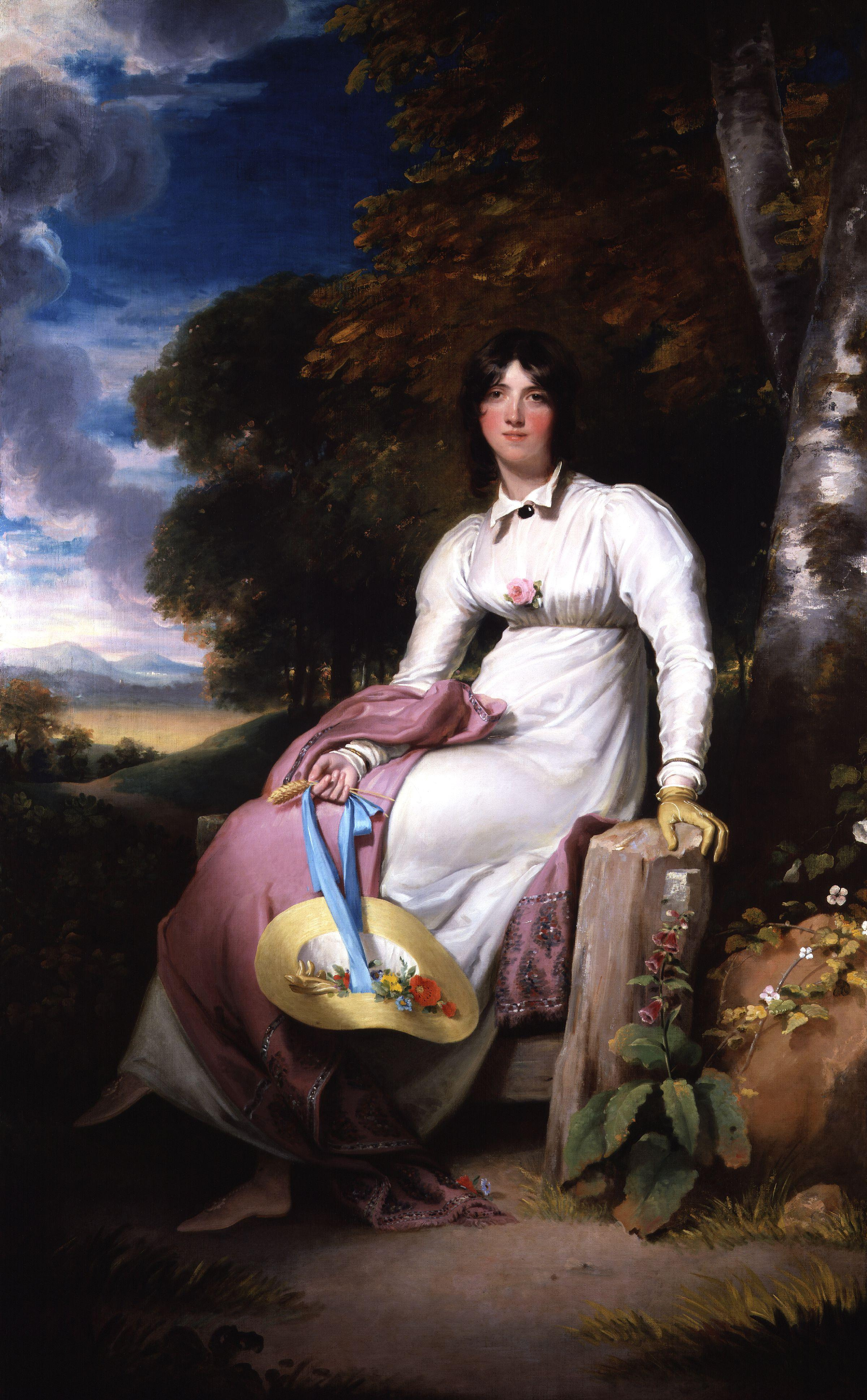
Sophia, Lady Burdett, c.1793

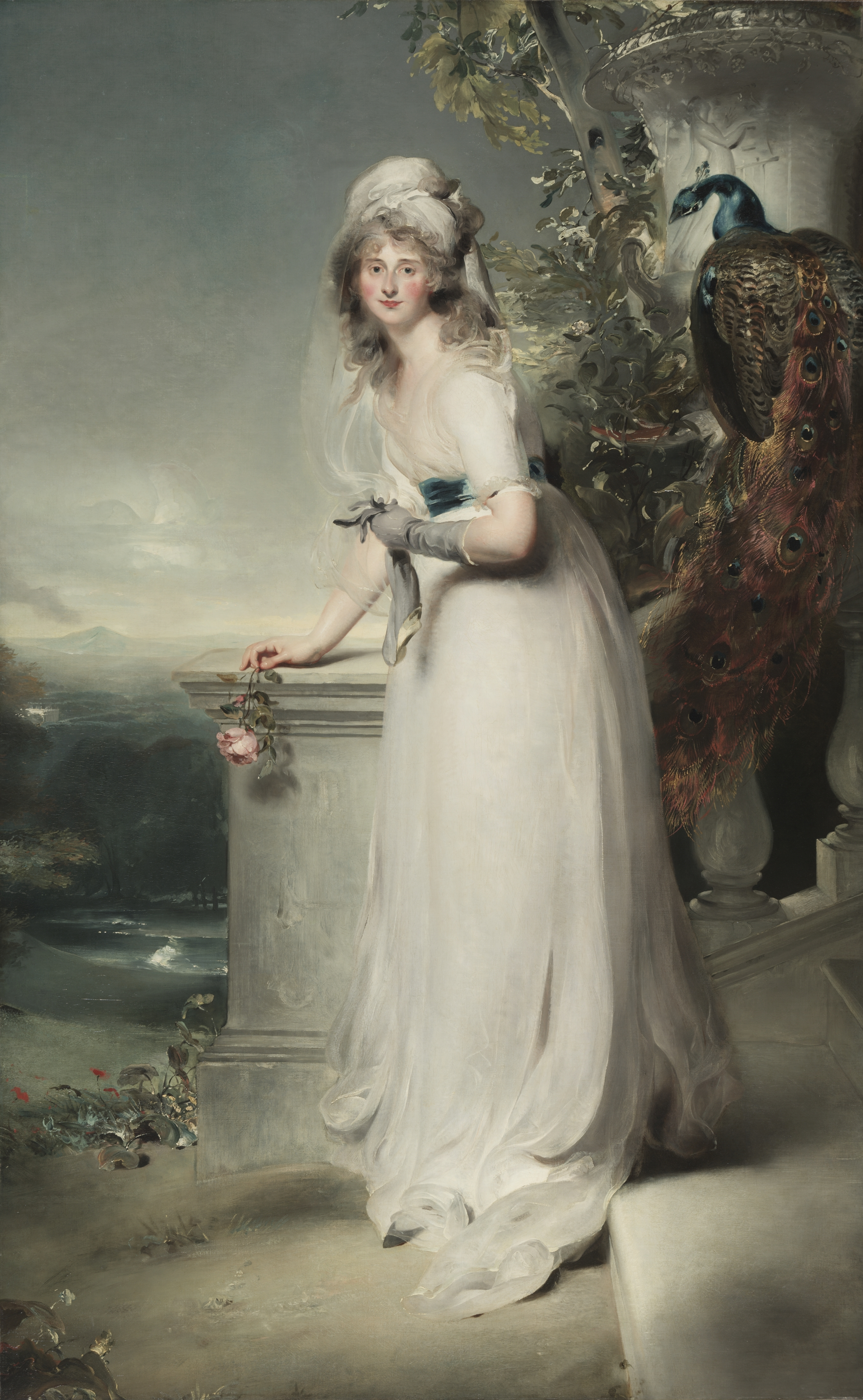
Portrait of Lady Manners, 1794

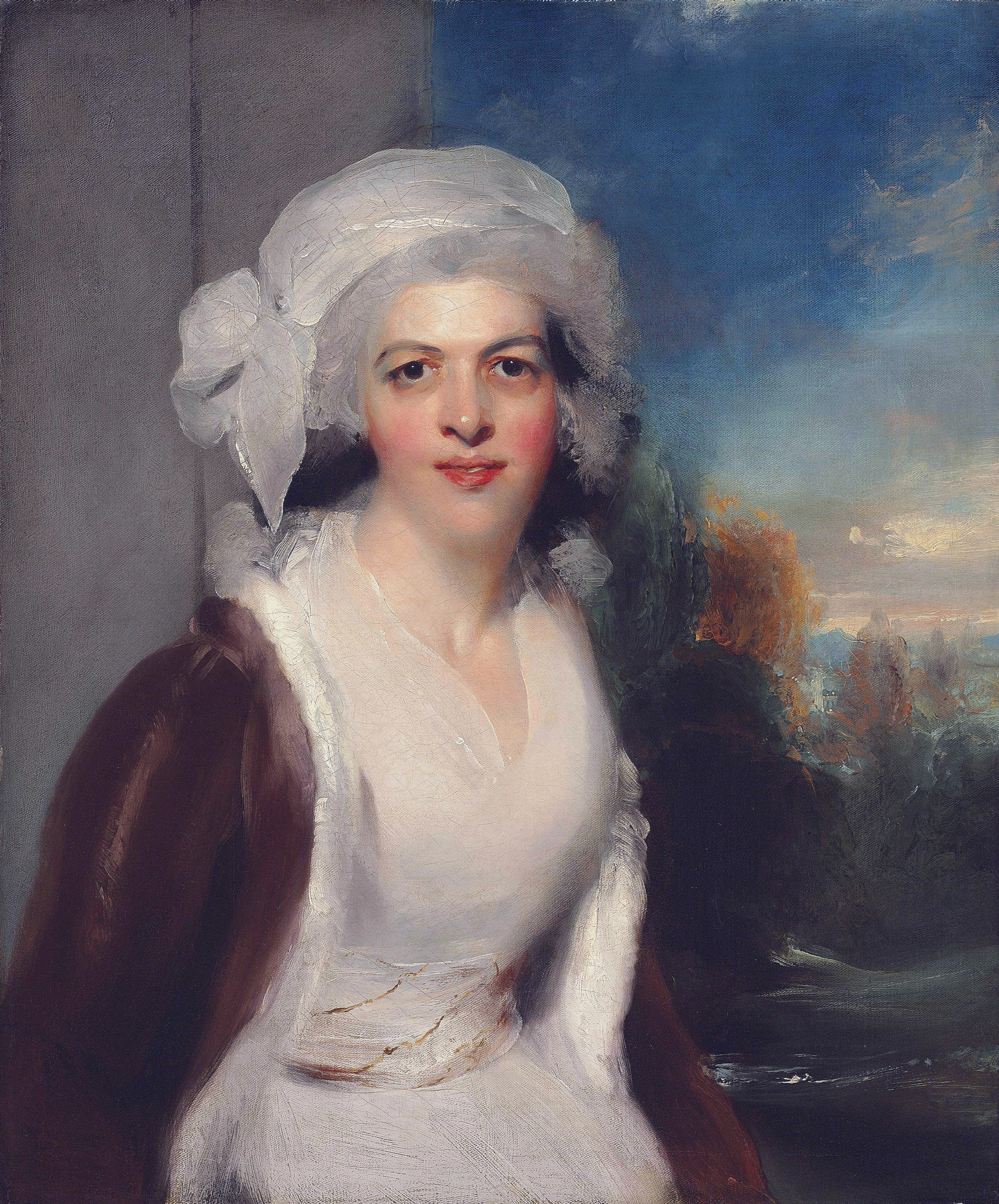
Rebecca, Lady Simeon, early 1790s

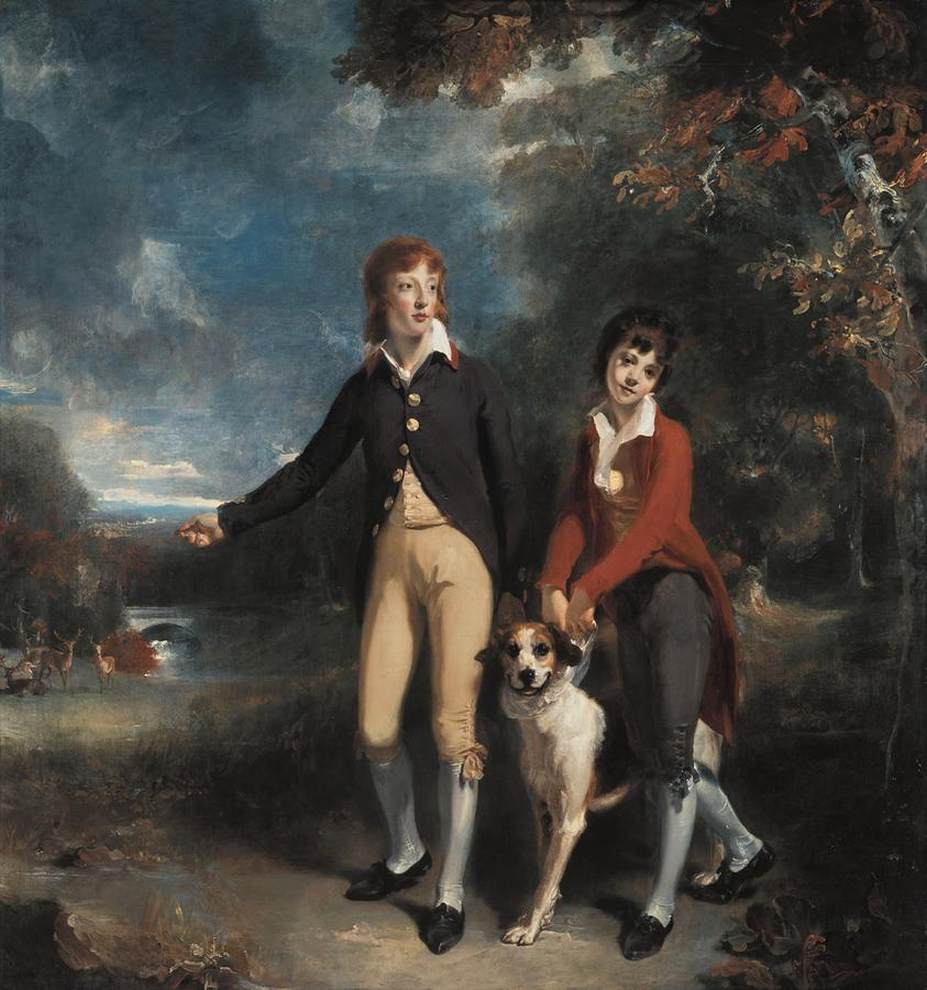
The Two Sons of the Earl of Talbot, 1793, Neue Pinakothek, Munich

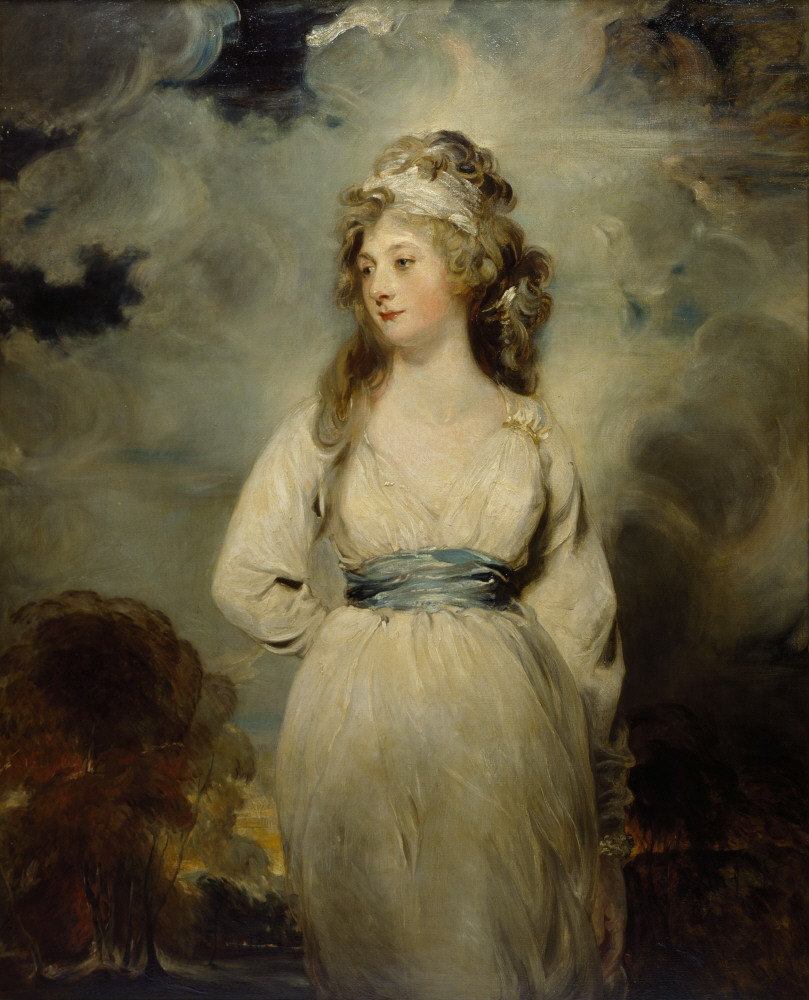
Amelia Stewart, Viscountess Castlereagh, 1794

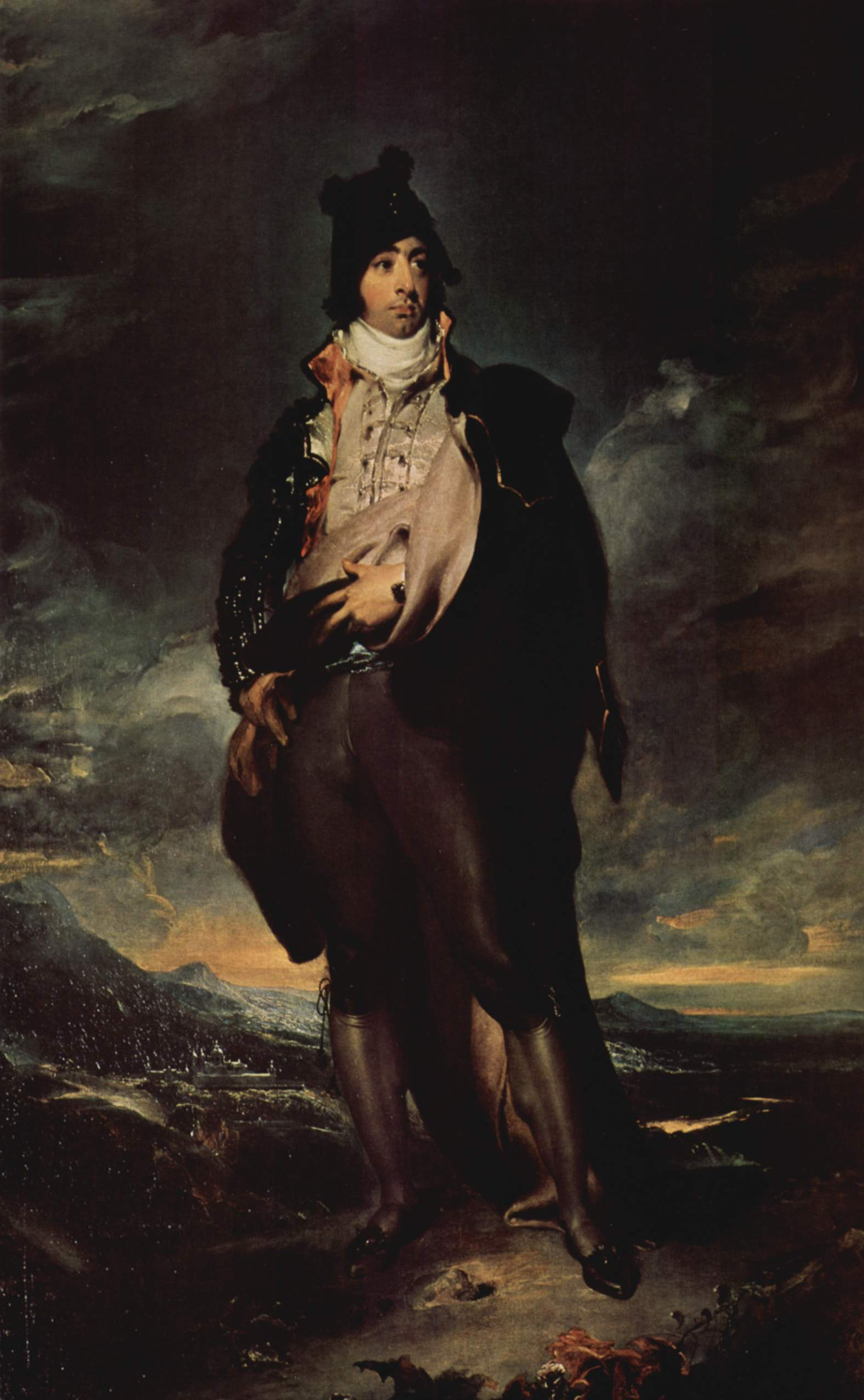
Lord Mount Stuart, 1795

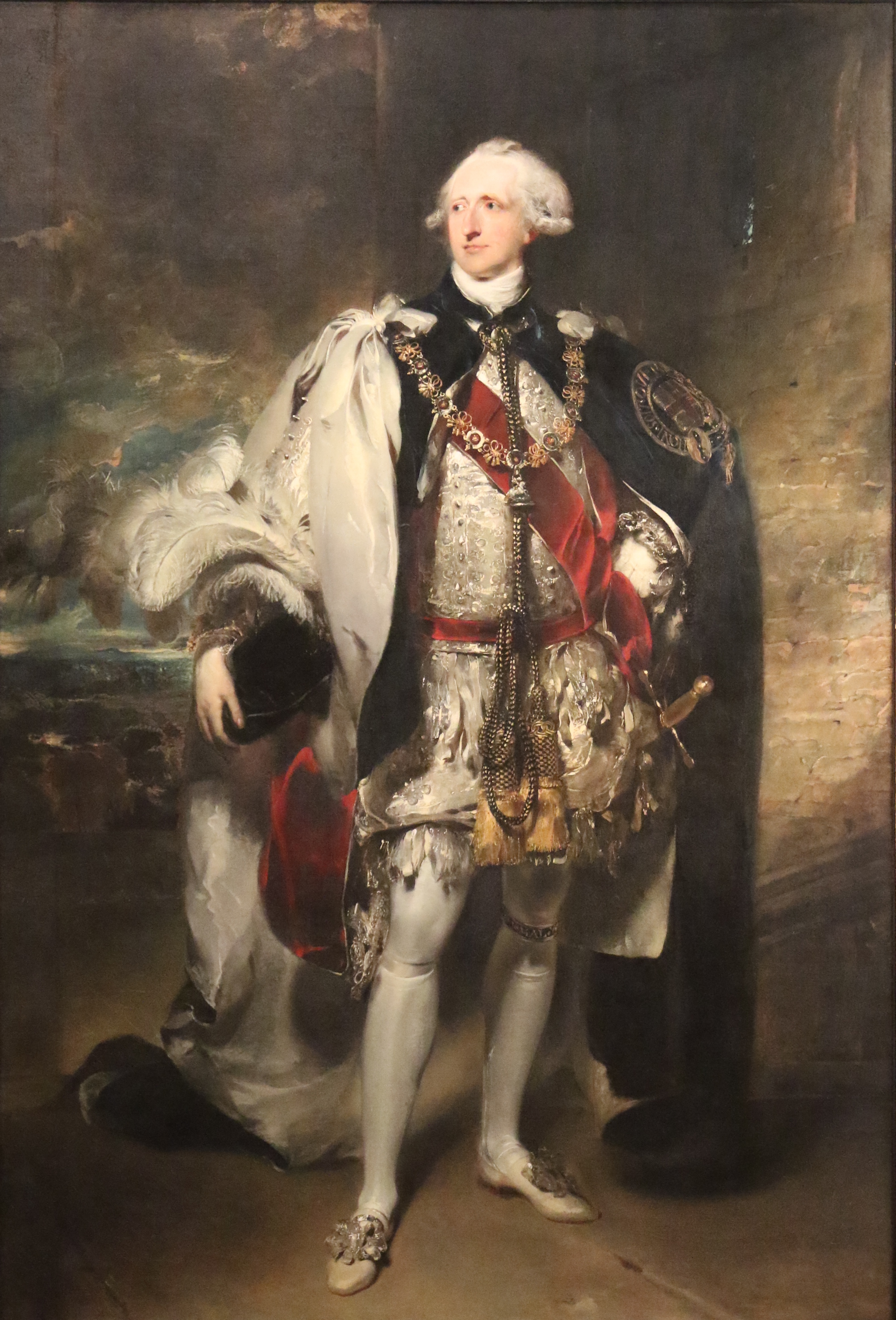
Portrait of the Duke of Leeds, 1796

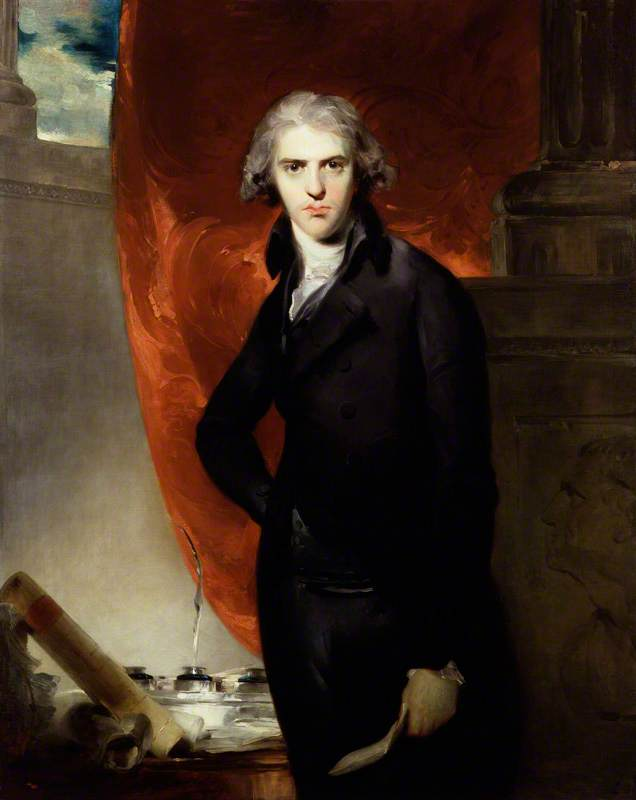
The Young Lord Liverpool, 1796

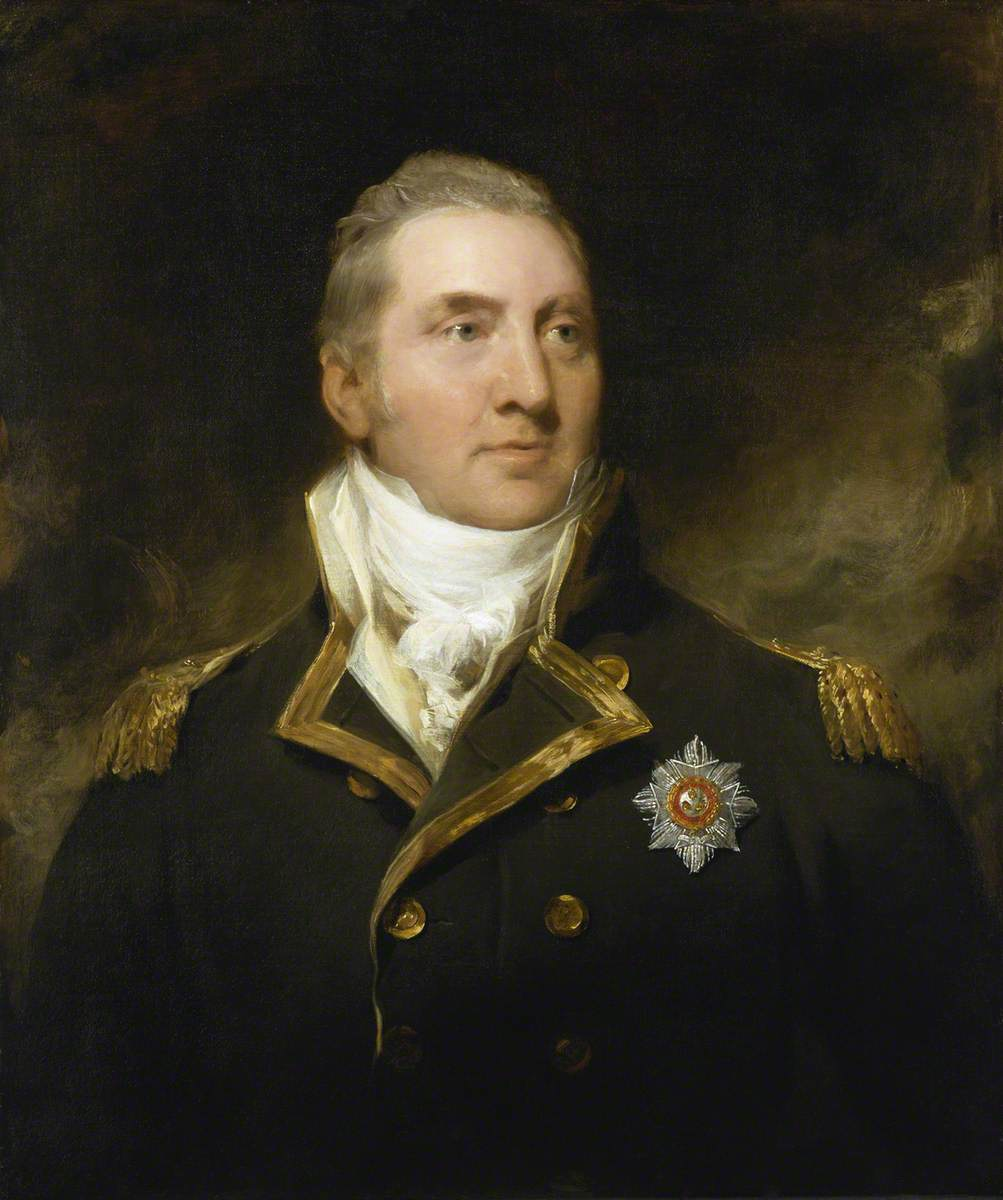
Portrait of Sir Edward Pellew, 1797

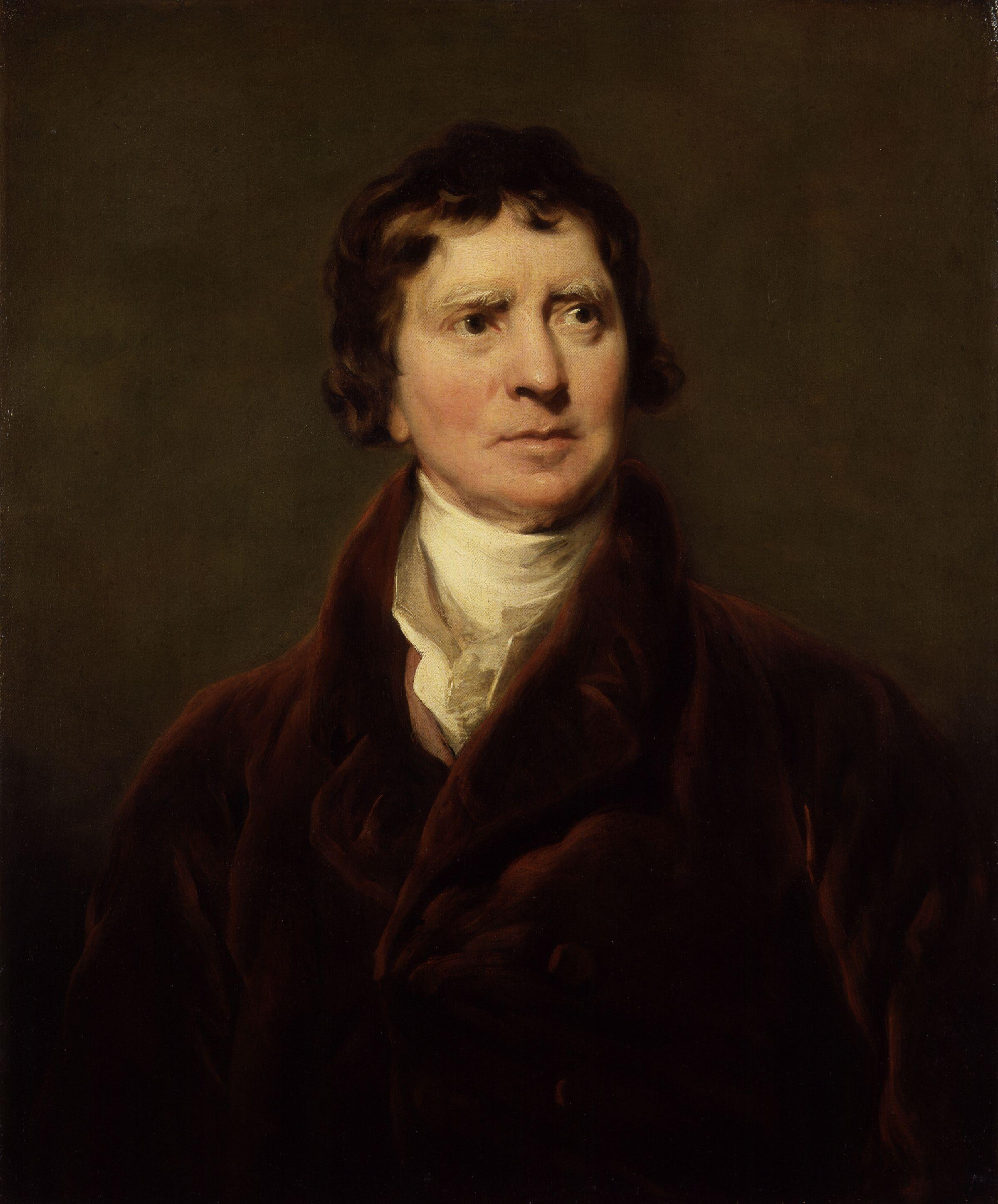
Henry Dundas, unknown date

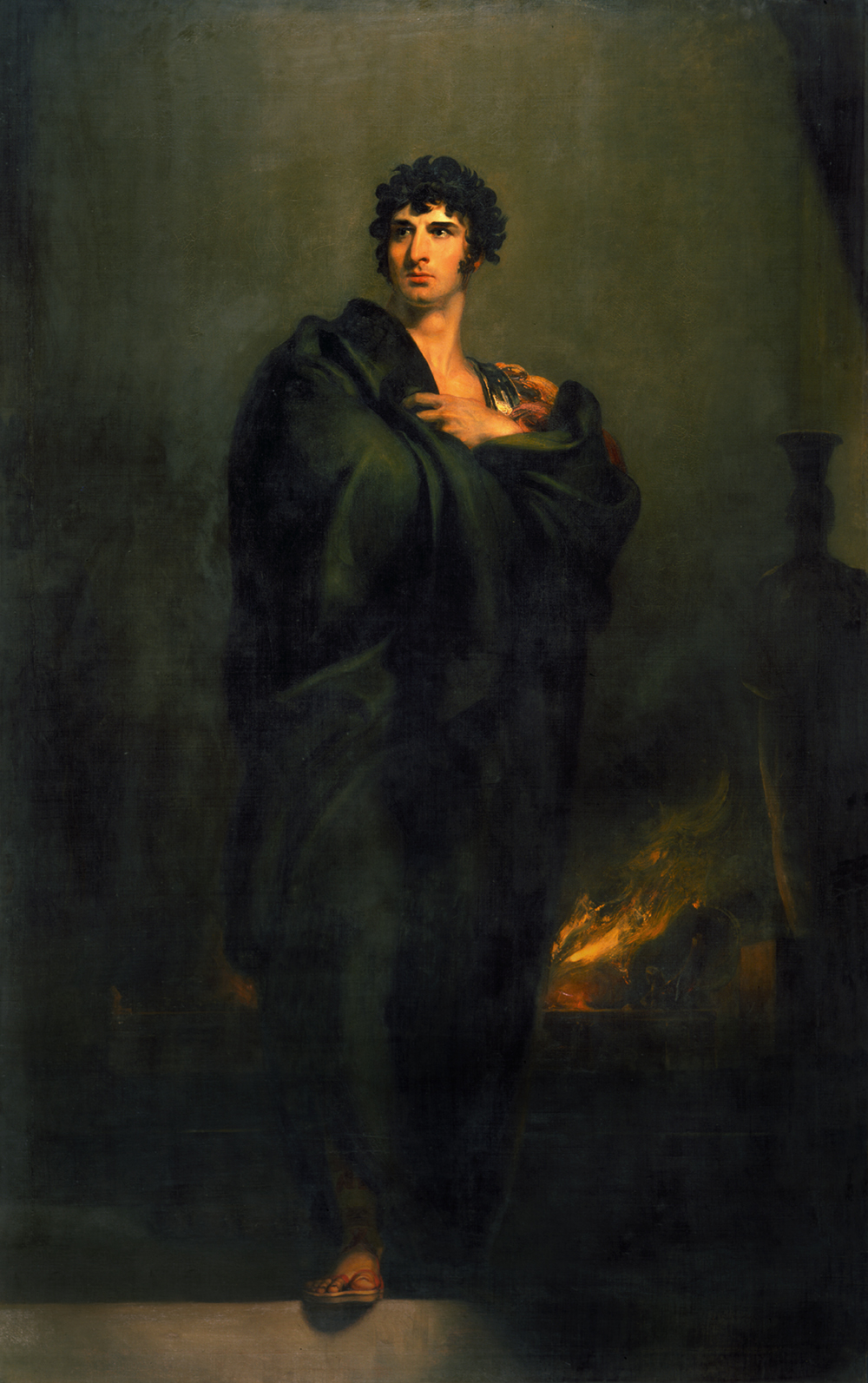
John Philip Kemble as Coriolanus, 1798

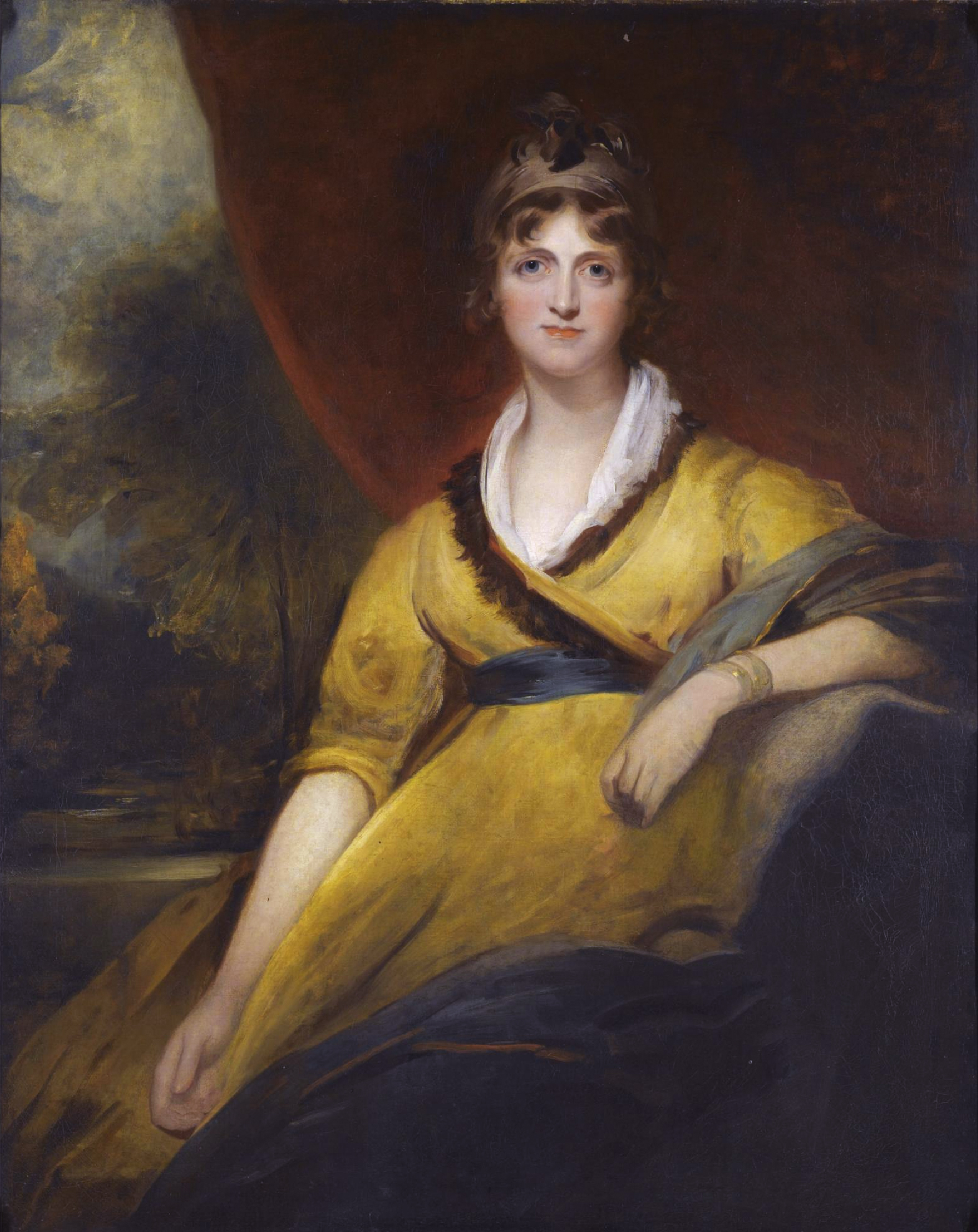
Mary, Countess of Inchiquin, 1800

John Philip Kemble as Rolla, 1800

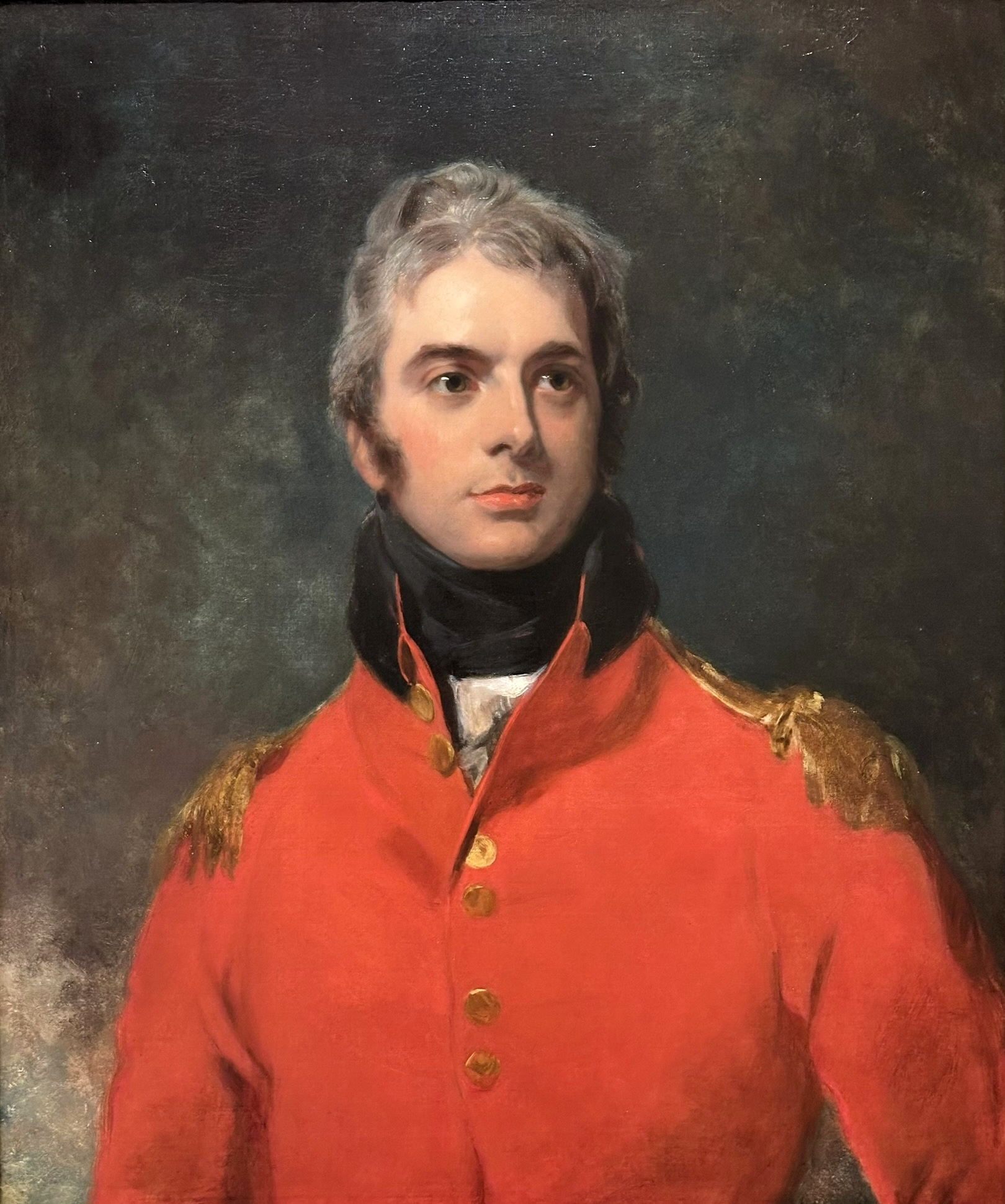
Captain Herbert Taylor (c.1800, Museum of the Shenandoah Valley

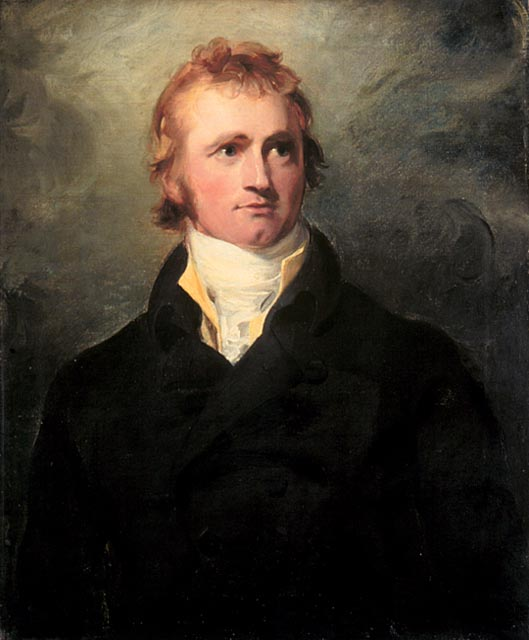
Alexander MacKenzie, (c. 1800–1801), National Gallery of Canada

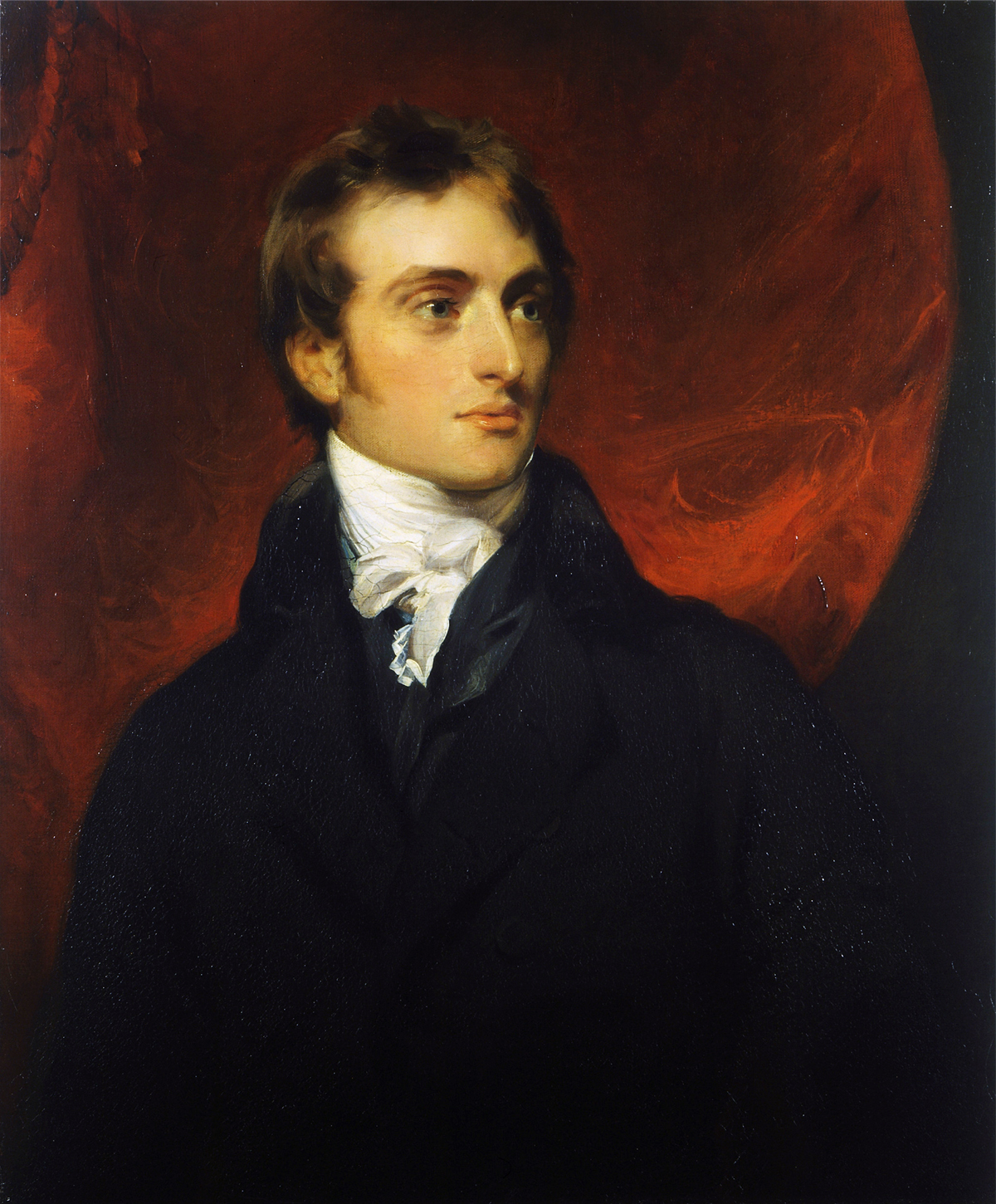
Codrington Edmund Carrington, 1801

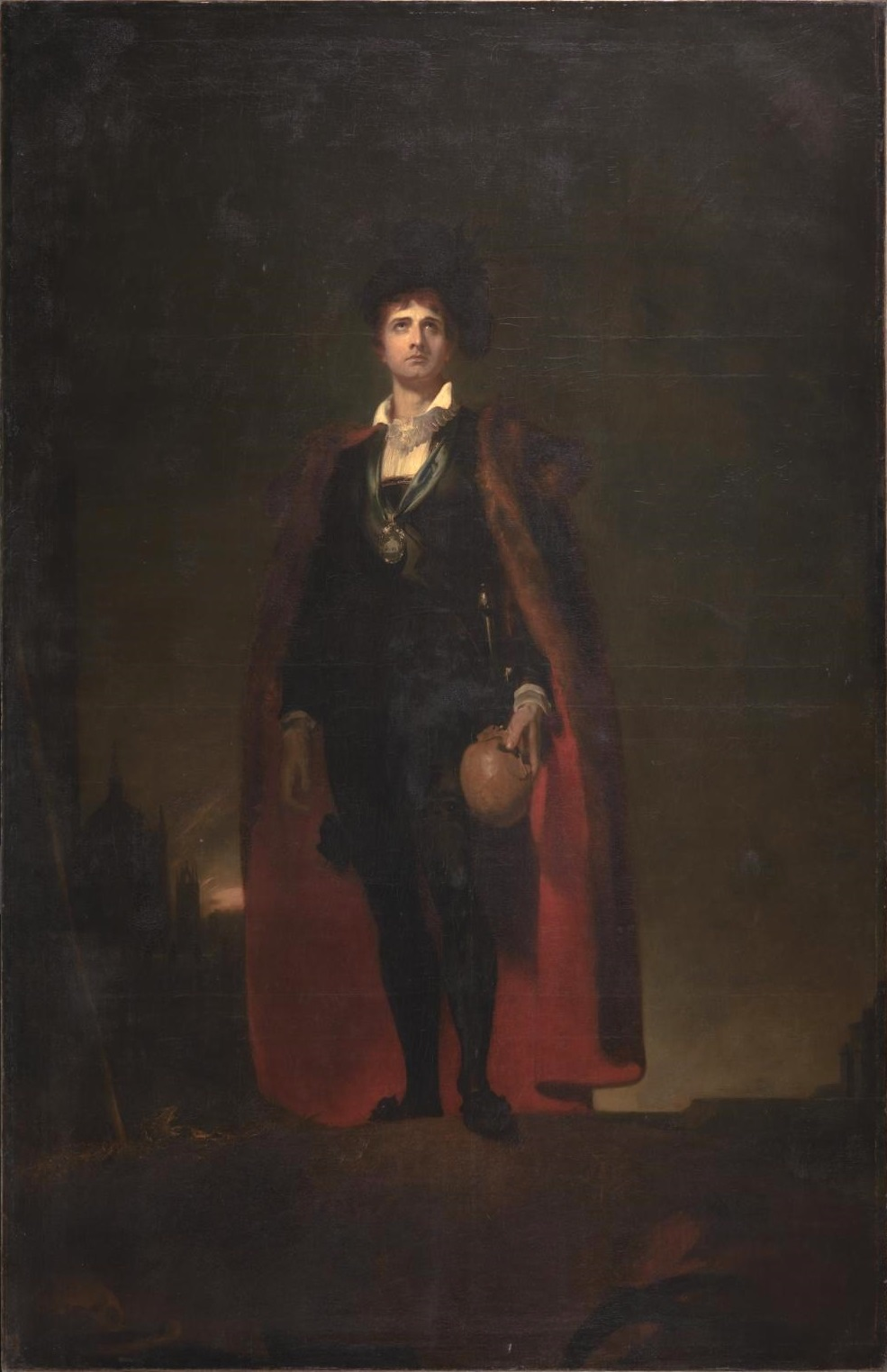
John Philip Kemble as Hamlet, 1801

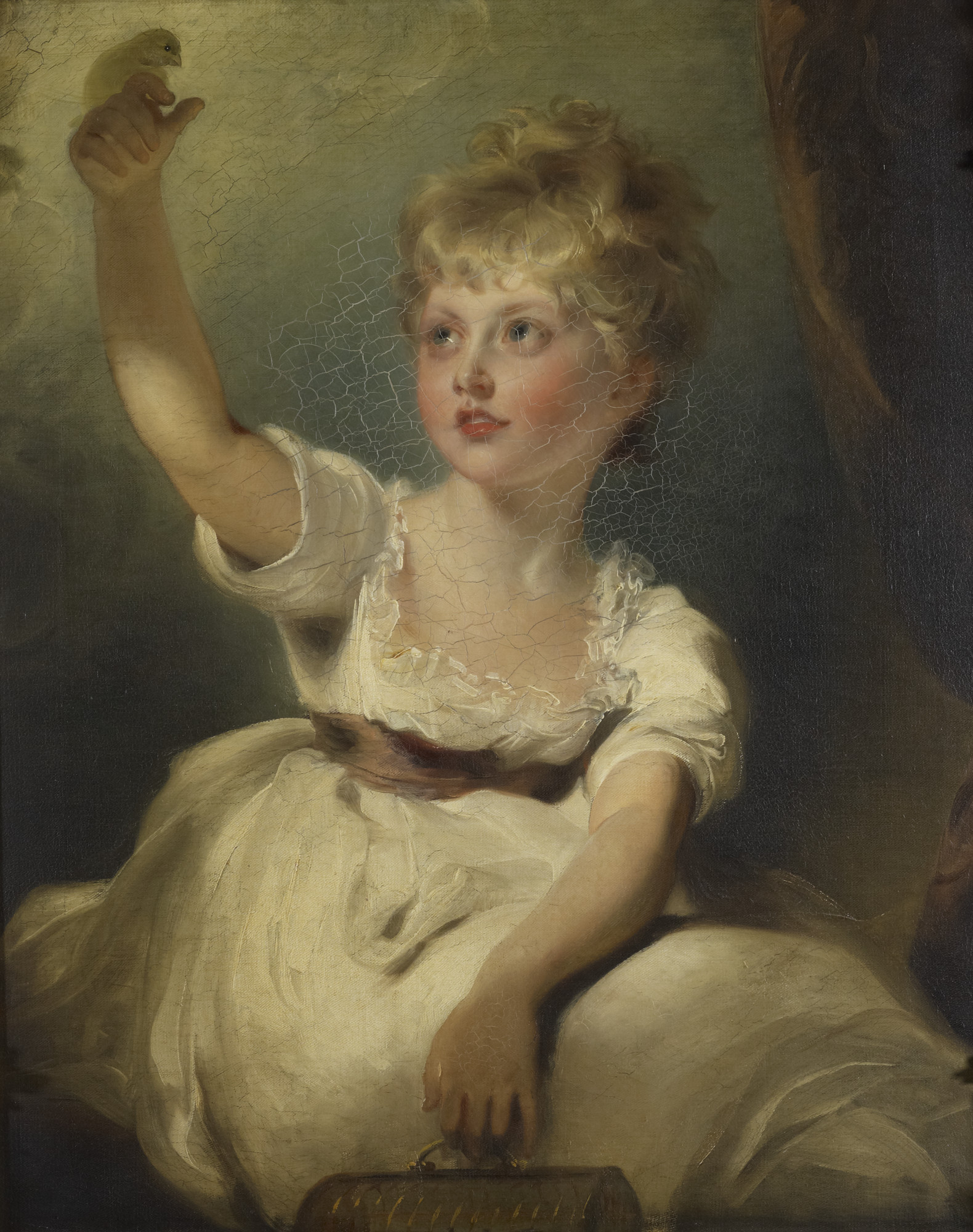
Princess Charlotte of Wales, c. 1801

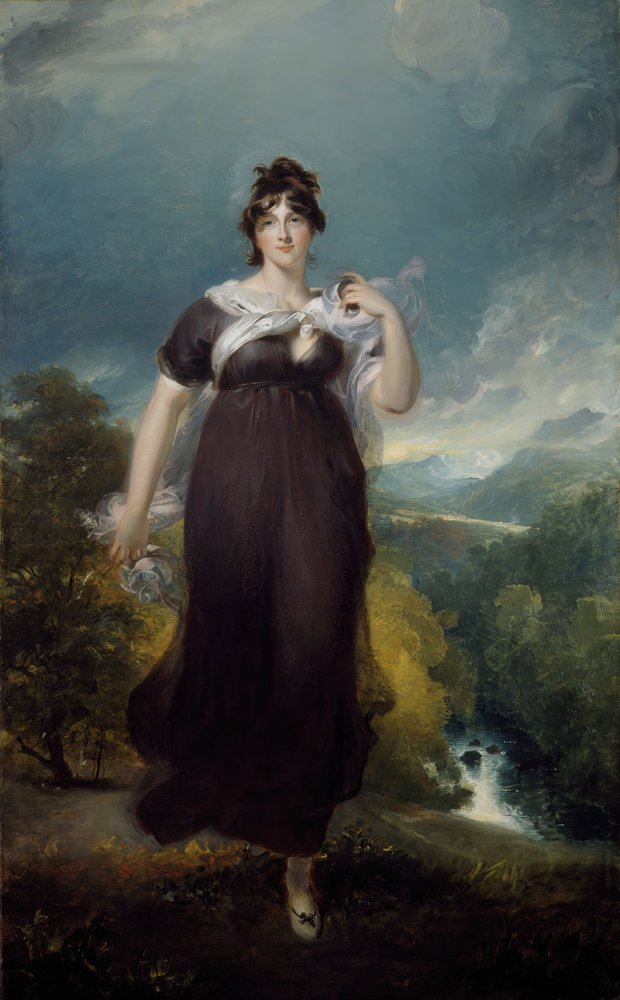
Portrait of Countess Conyngham, 1802

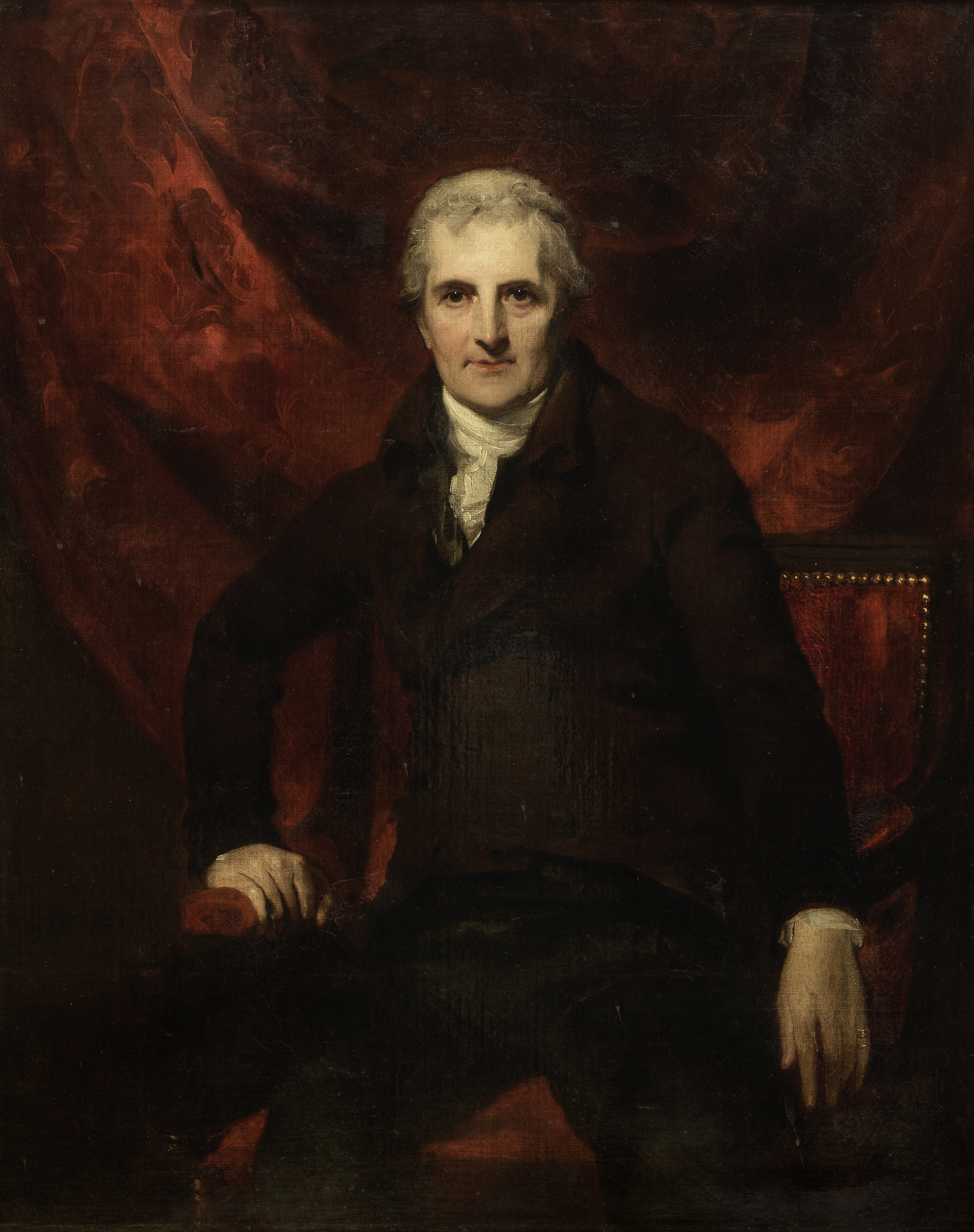
George Griffin Stonestreet, 1802

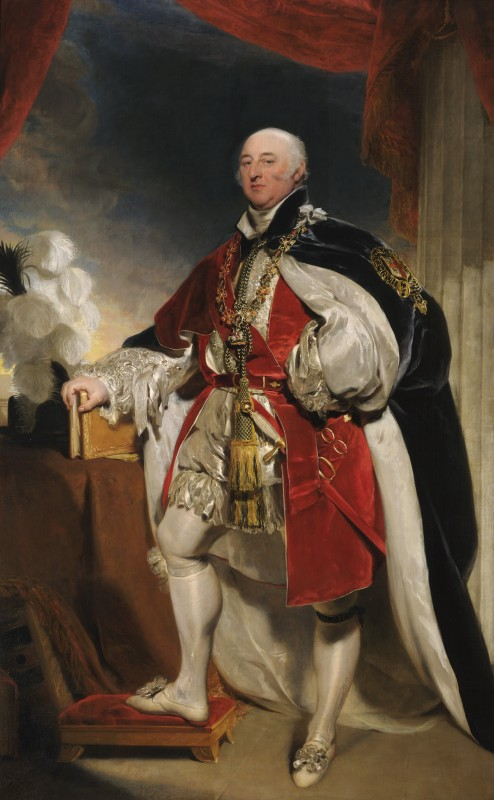
Earl of Camden, 1802

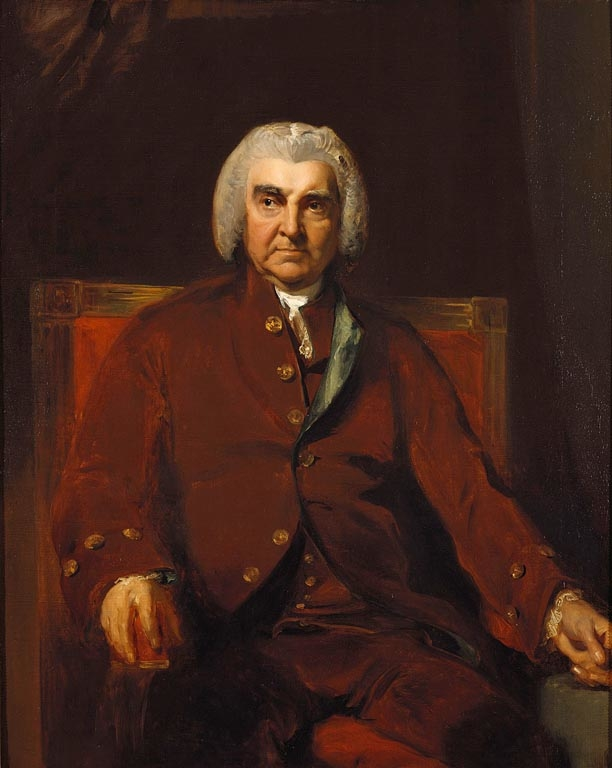
Portrait of Lord Thurlow, 1803

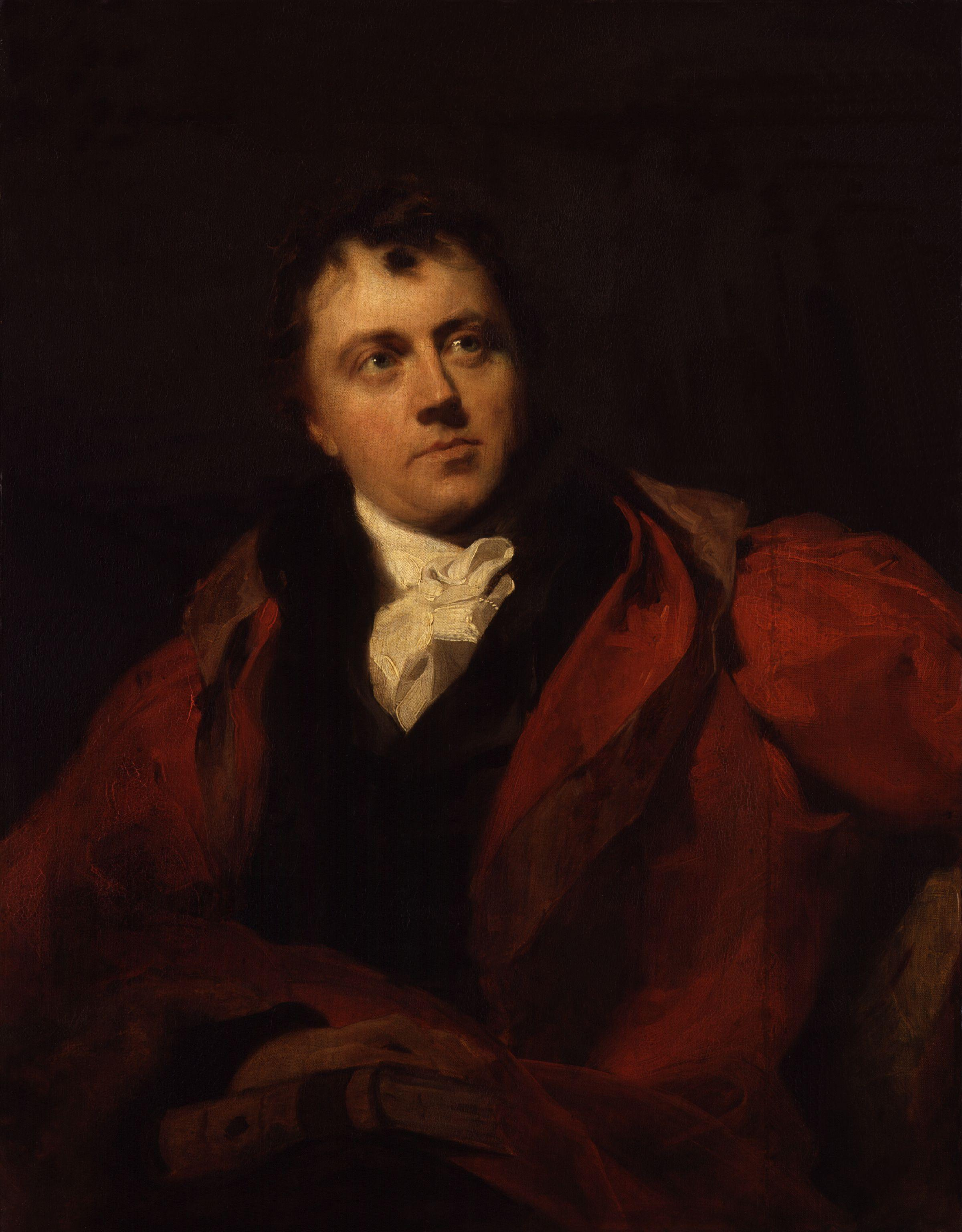
Sir James Mackintosh, 1804

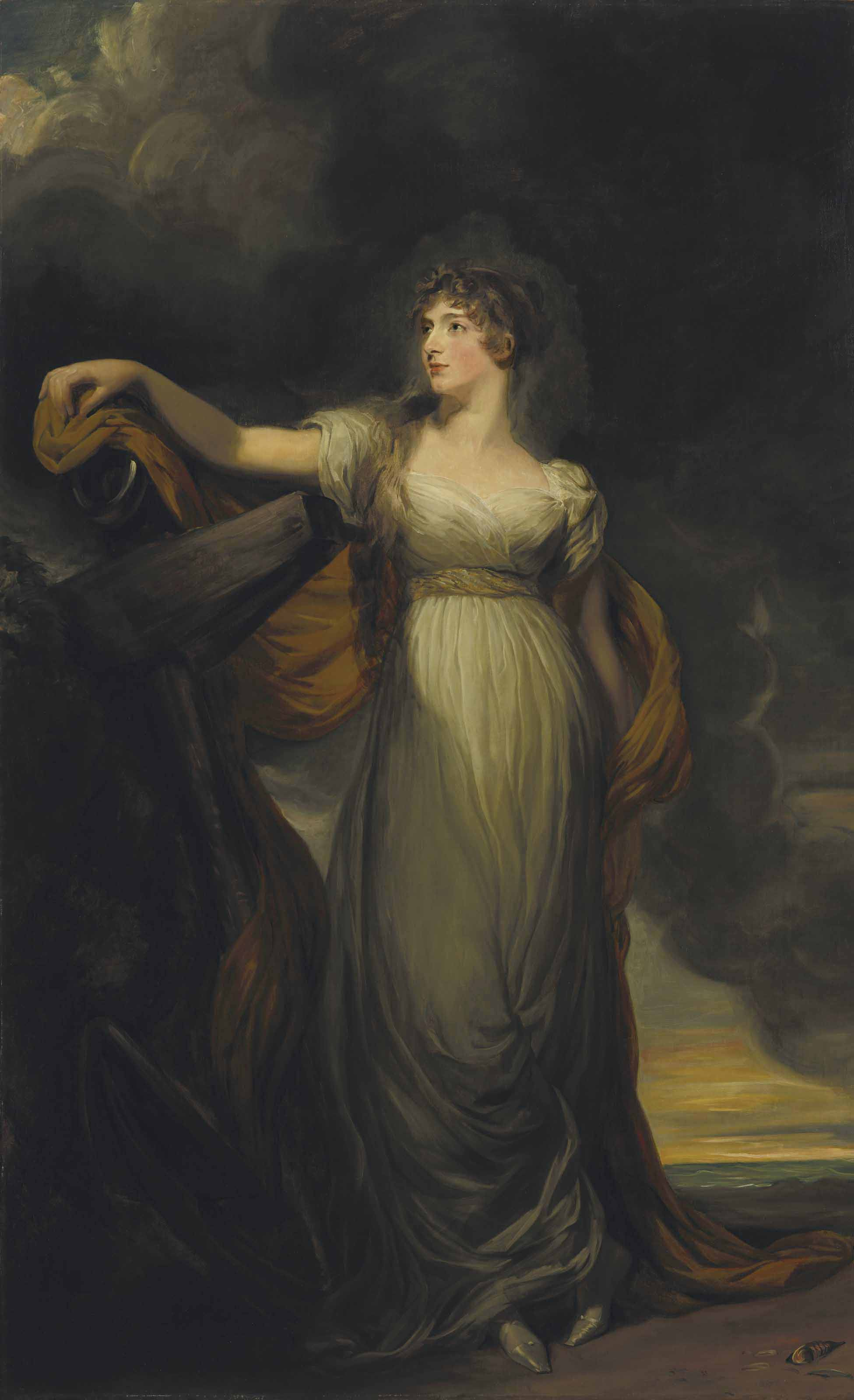
Lady Hinchingbrook as Hope, 1804

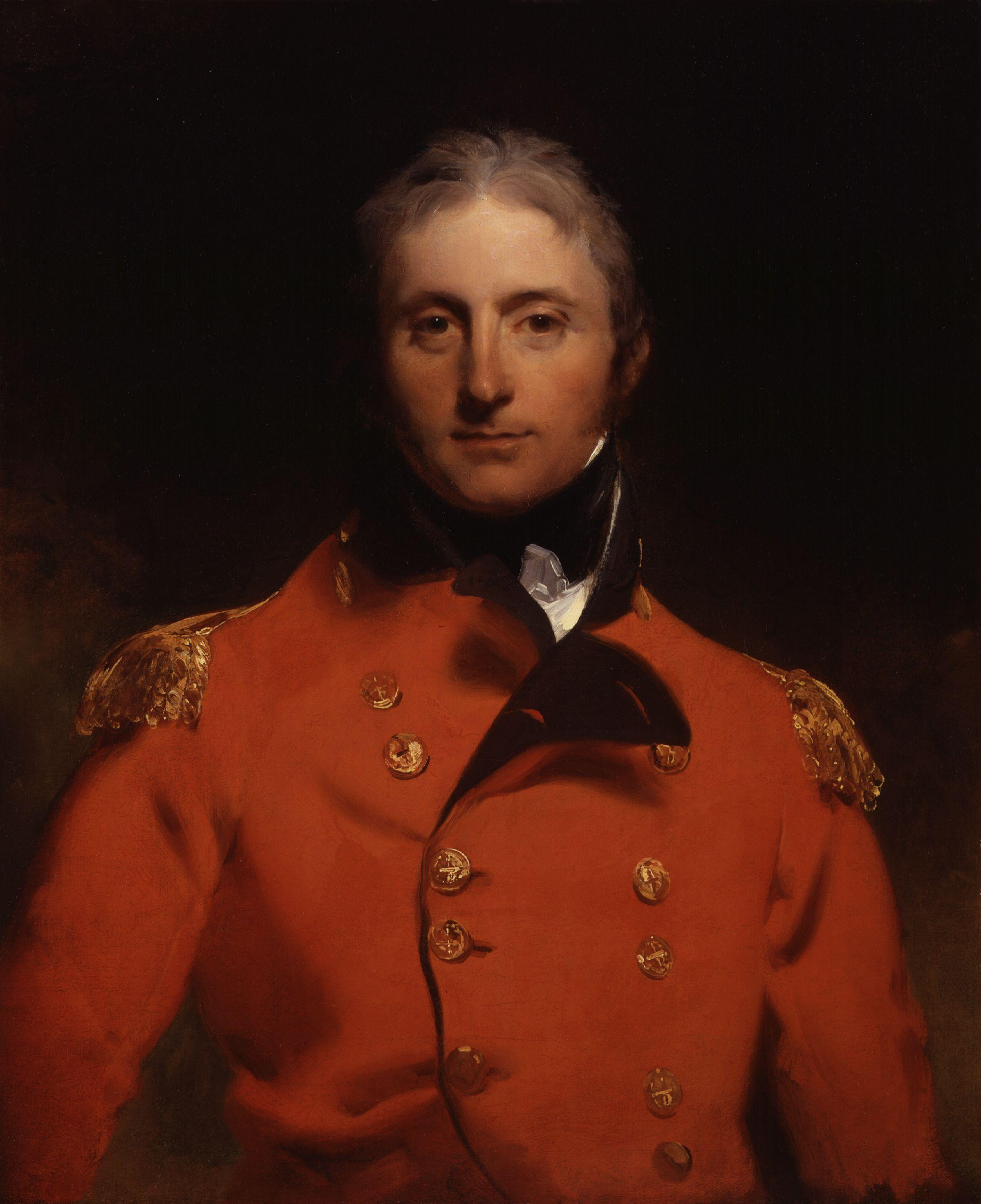
Portrait of Sir John Moore, c. 1804

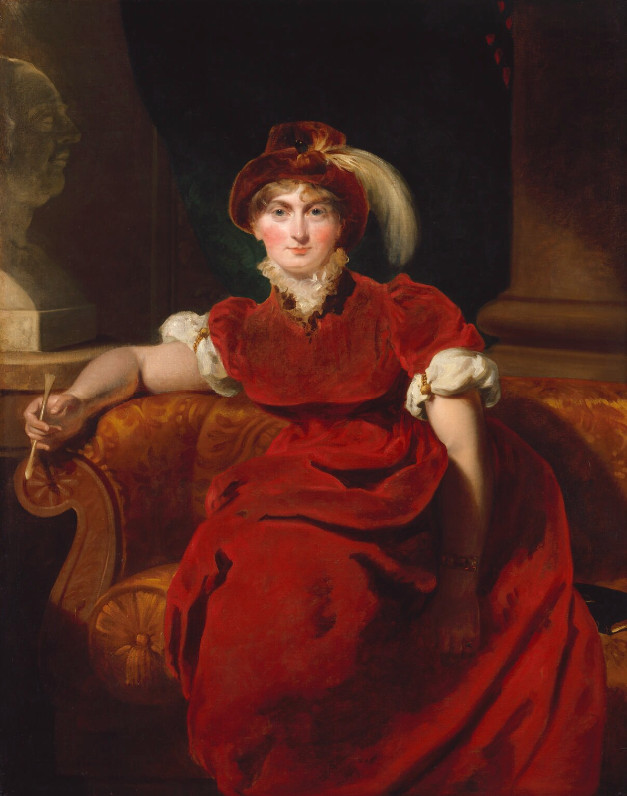
Portrait of Caroline of Brunswick, 1804

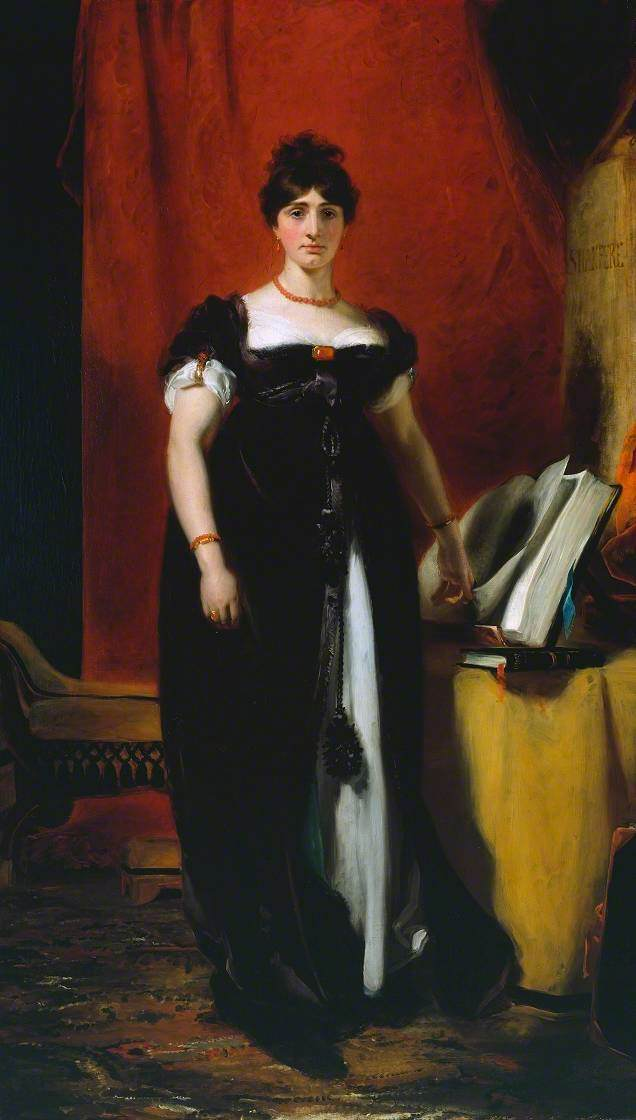
Portrait of Sarah Siddons, 1804

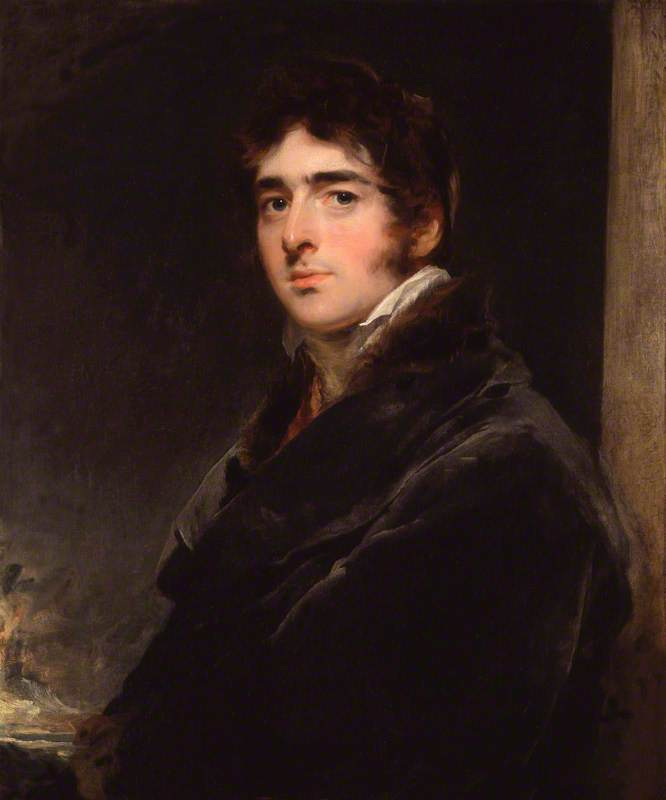
Portrait of the Young Lord Melbourne, c. 1805

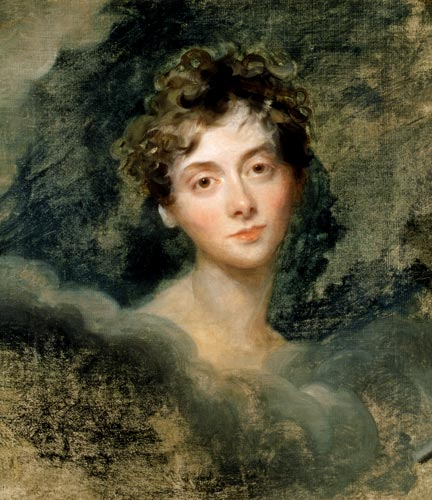
Lady Caroline Lamb, c.1805

Portrait of Joseph Banks, 1806

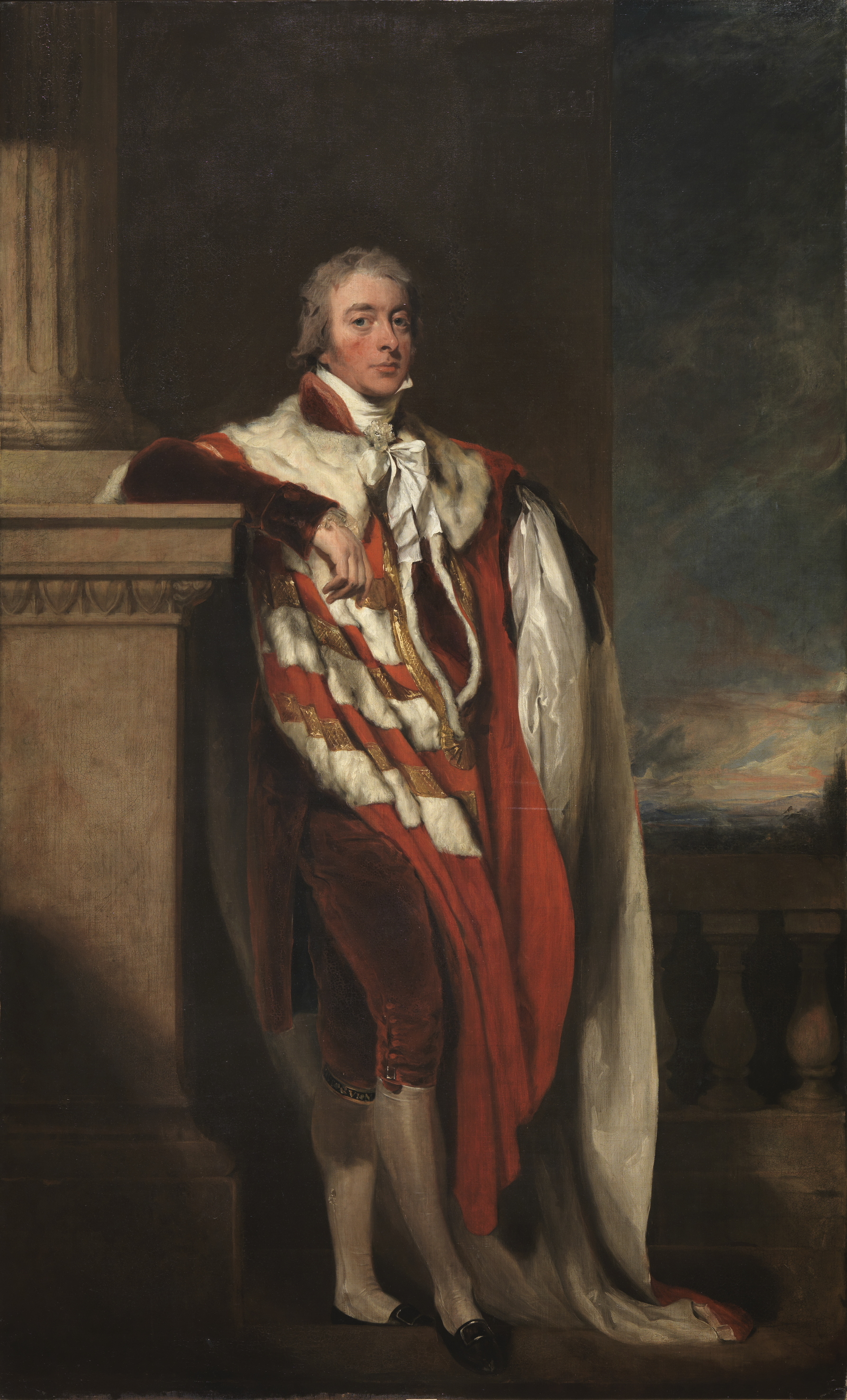
Portrait of Lord Westmoreland, 1806

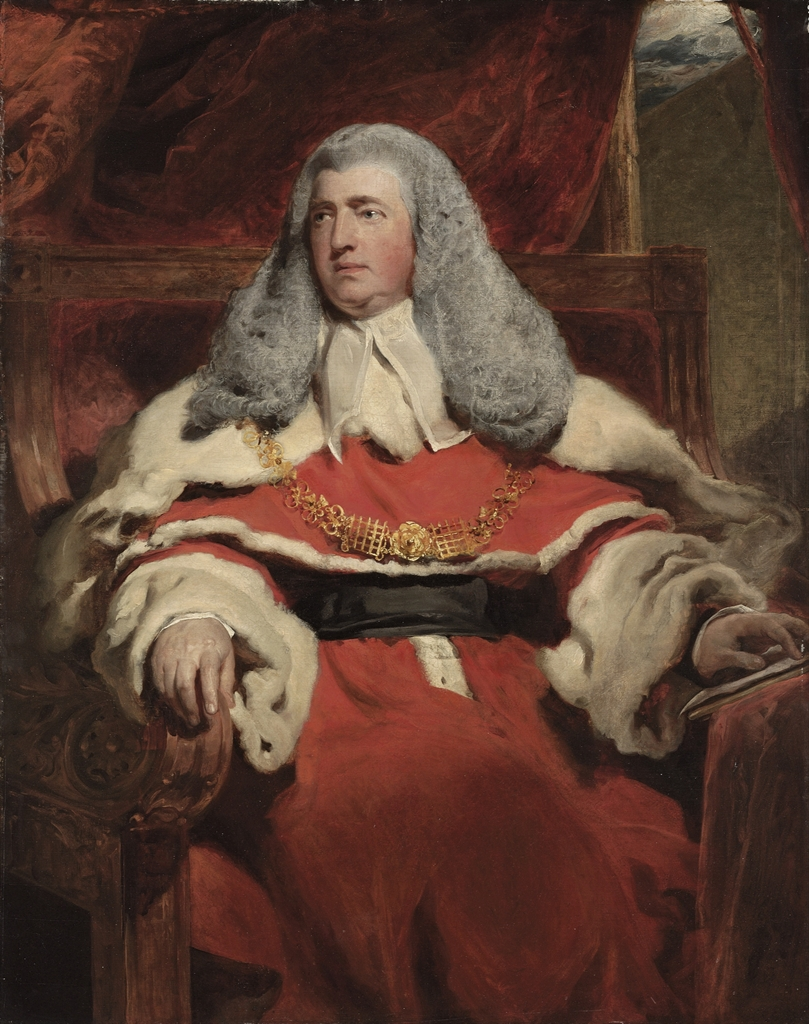
Lord Ellenborough, 1806

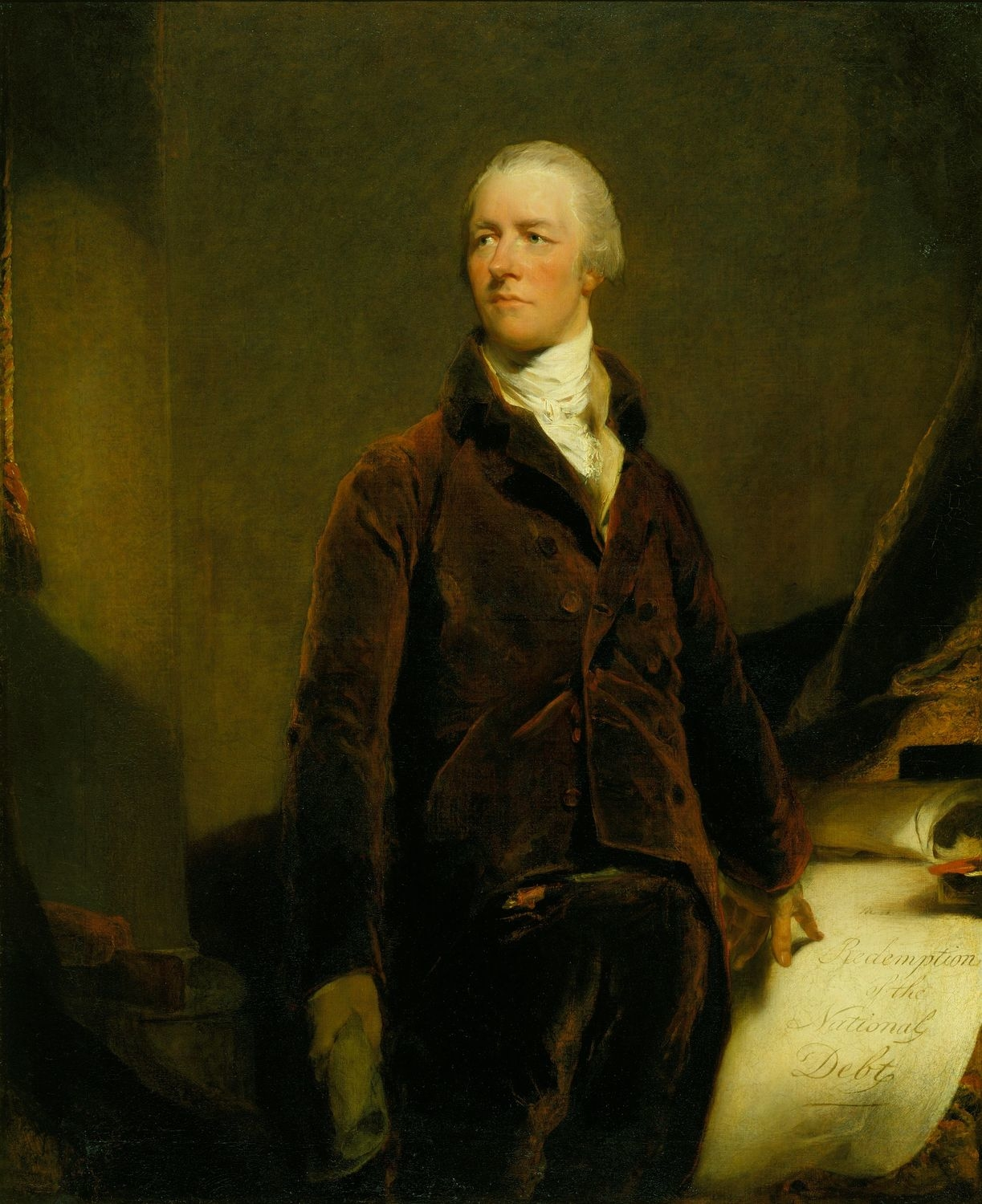
Portrait of William Pitt, 1807

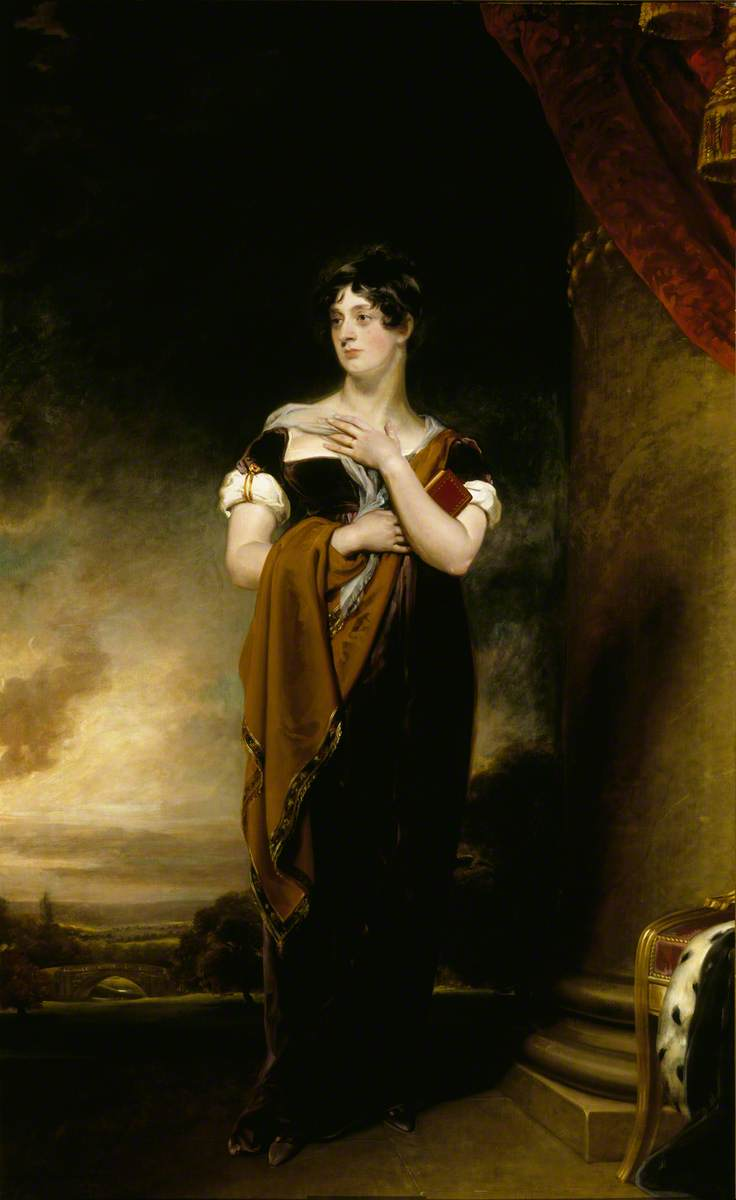
Marchioness of Ailesbury, 1809

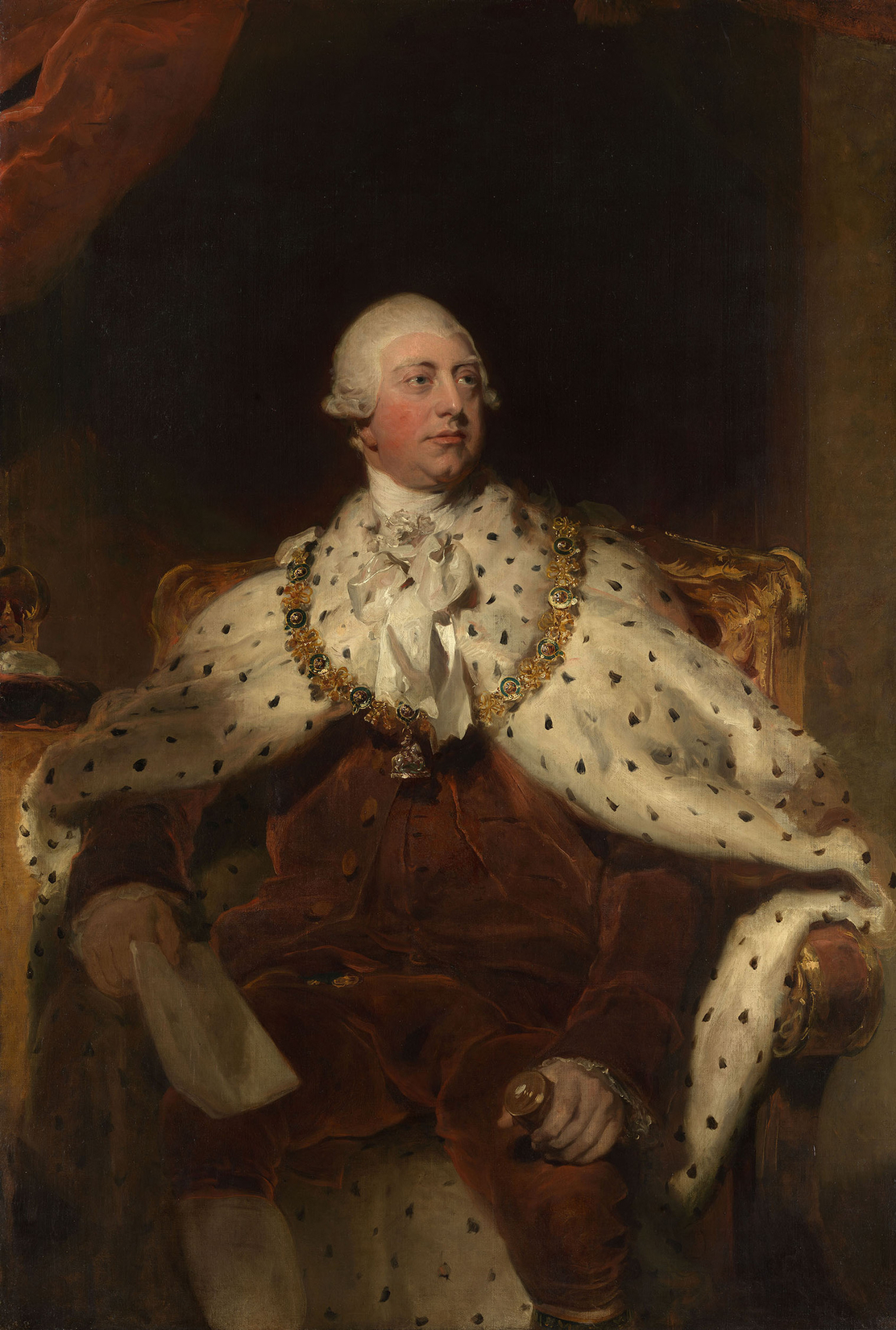
Portrait of George III in State Opening of Parliament dress, 1809

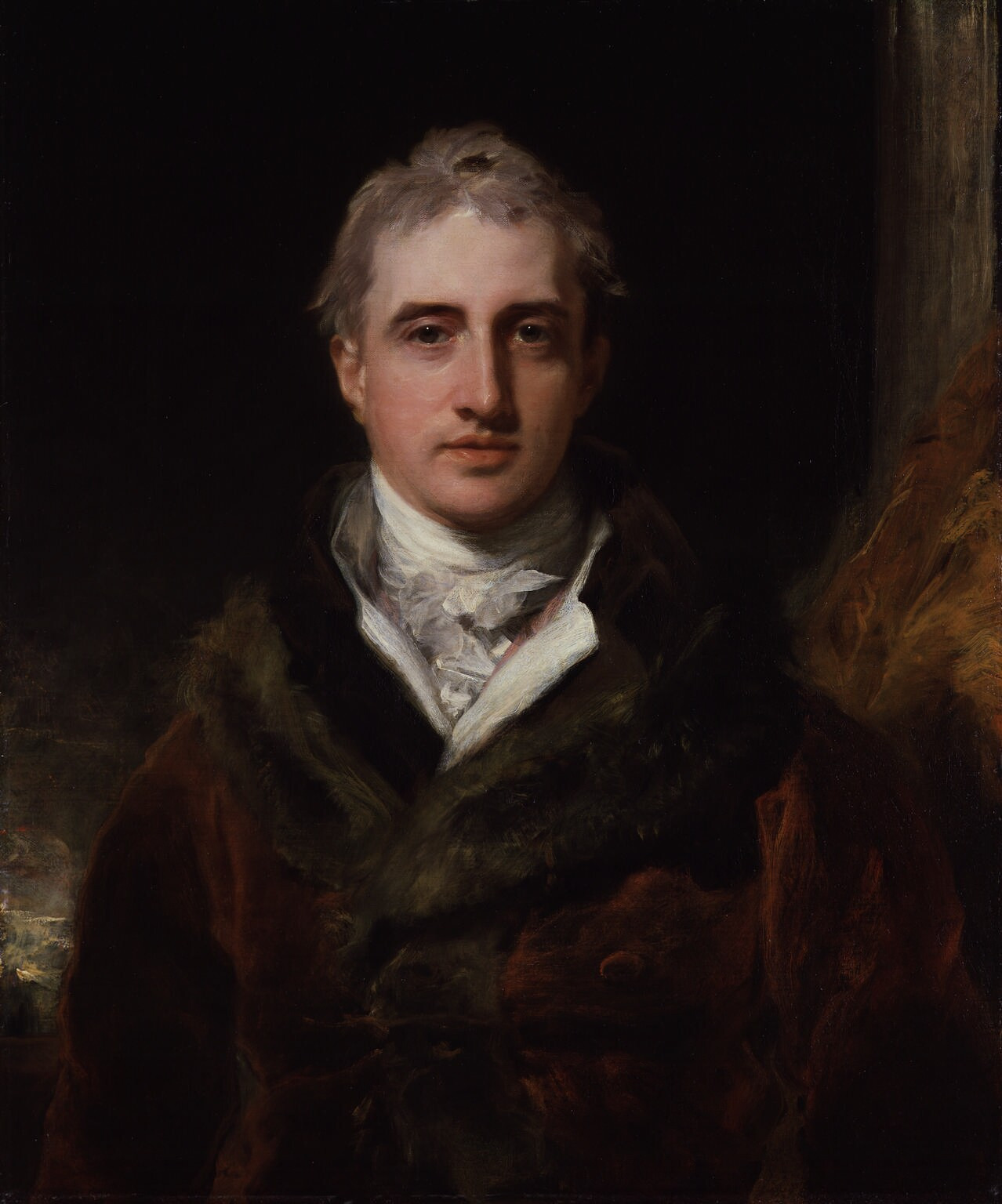
Portrait of Lord Castlereagh, 1809

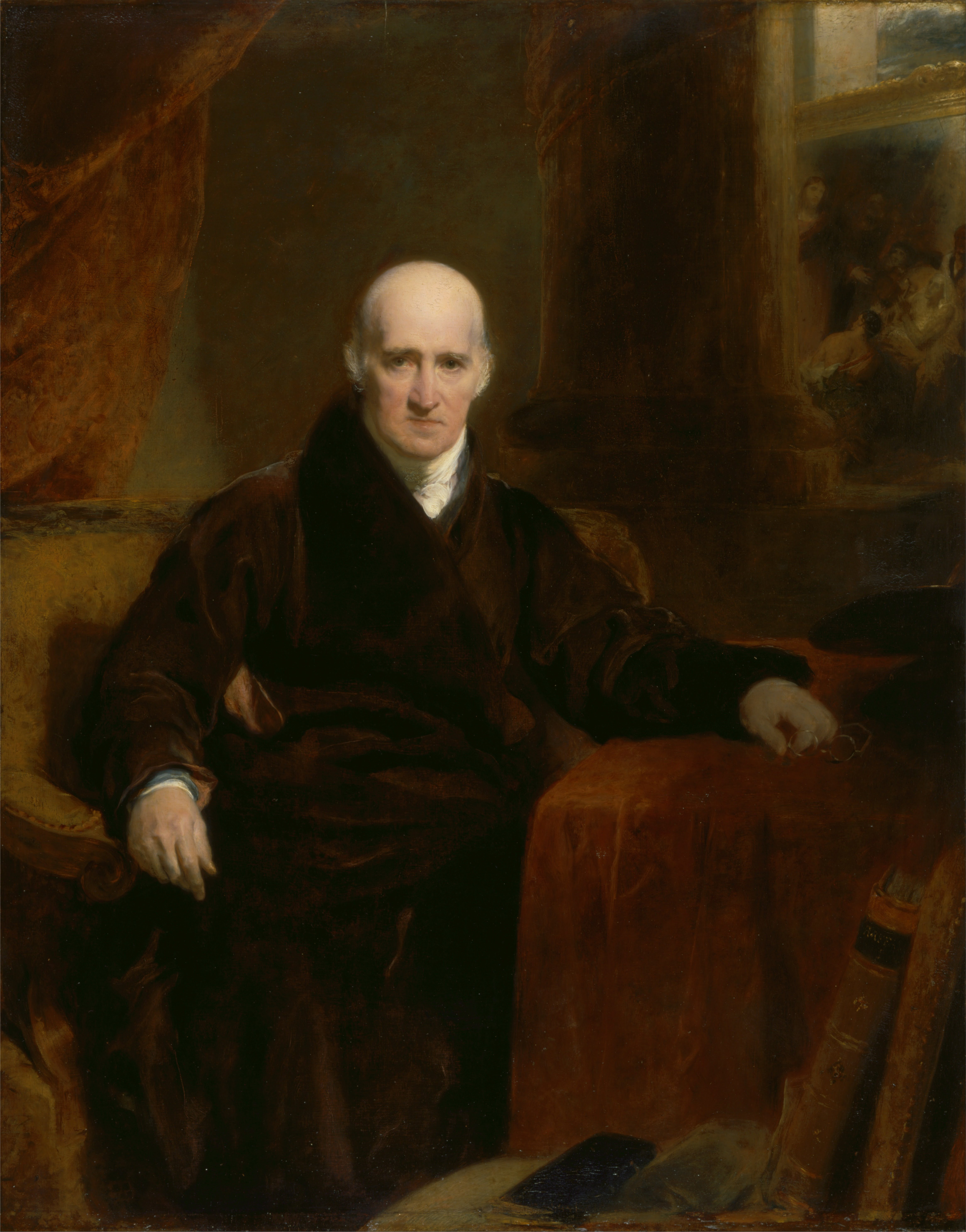
Portrait of Benjamin West, 1810

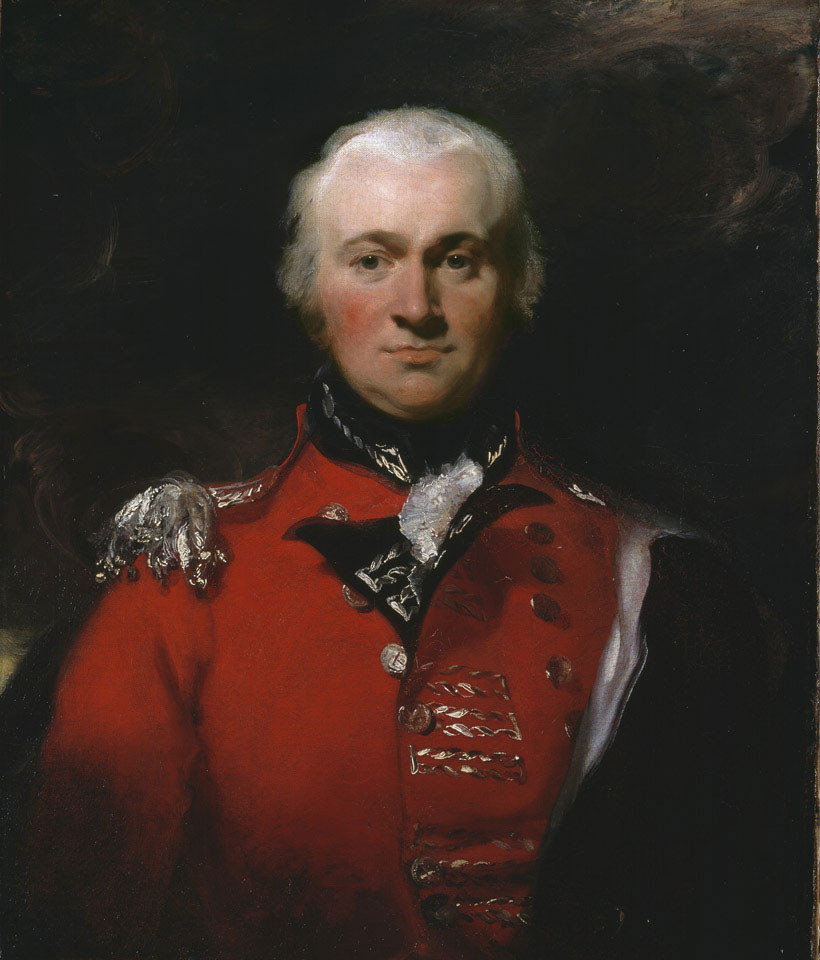
Robert Brownrigg, 1810

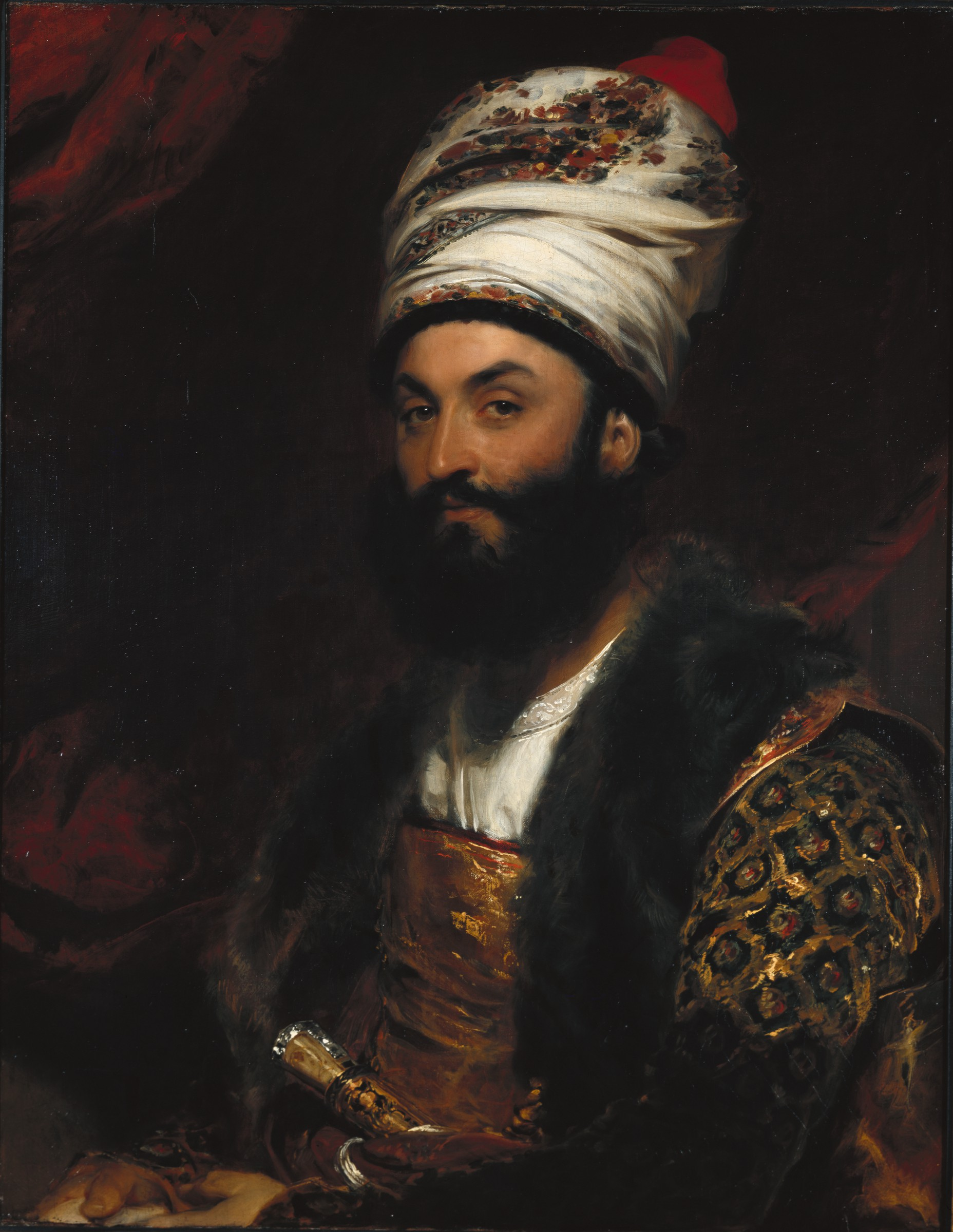
Portrait of Mirza Abul Hasan, 1810

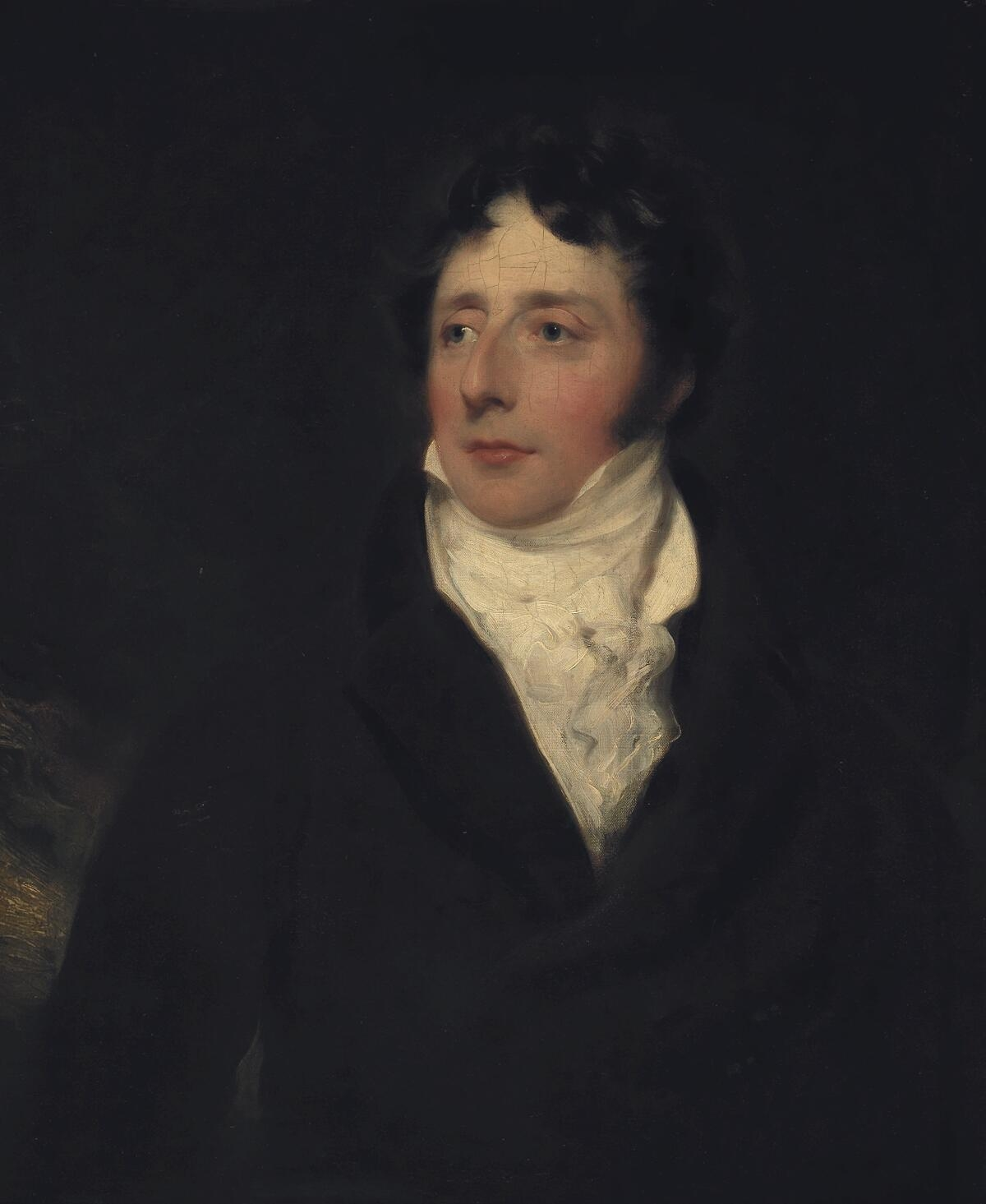
Robert Southey, 1810

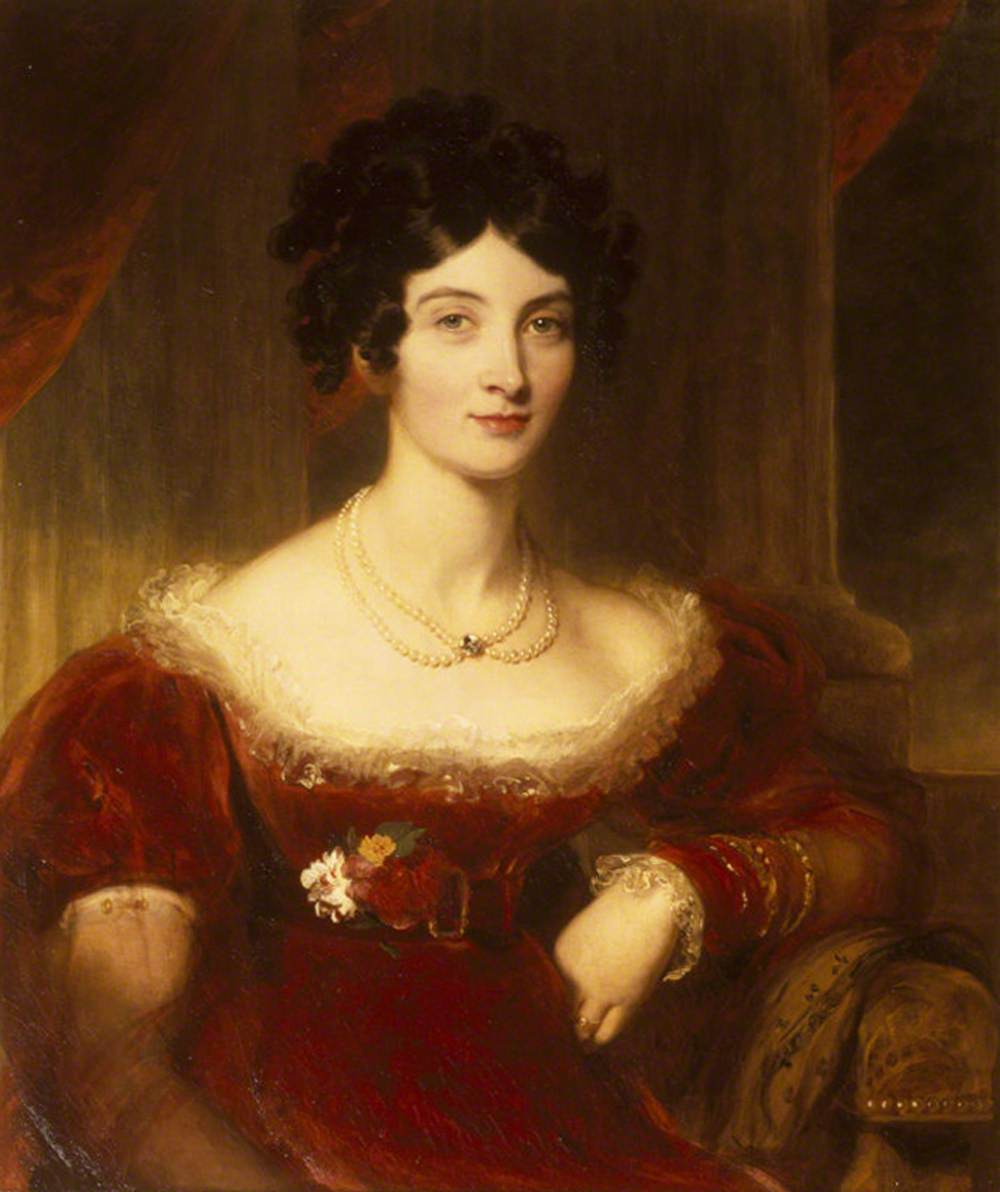
Anne Frances Bankes, Countess of Falmouth 1810–15

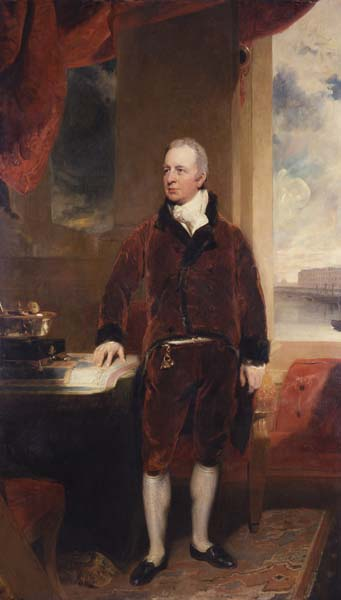
Portrait of George Hibbert, 1811

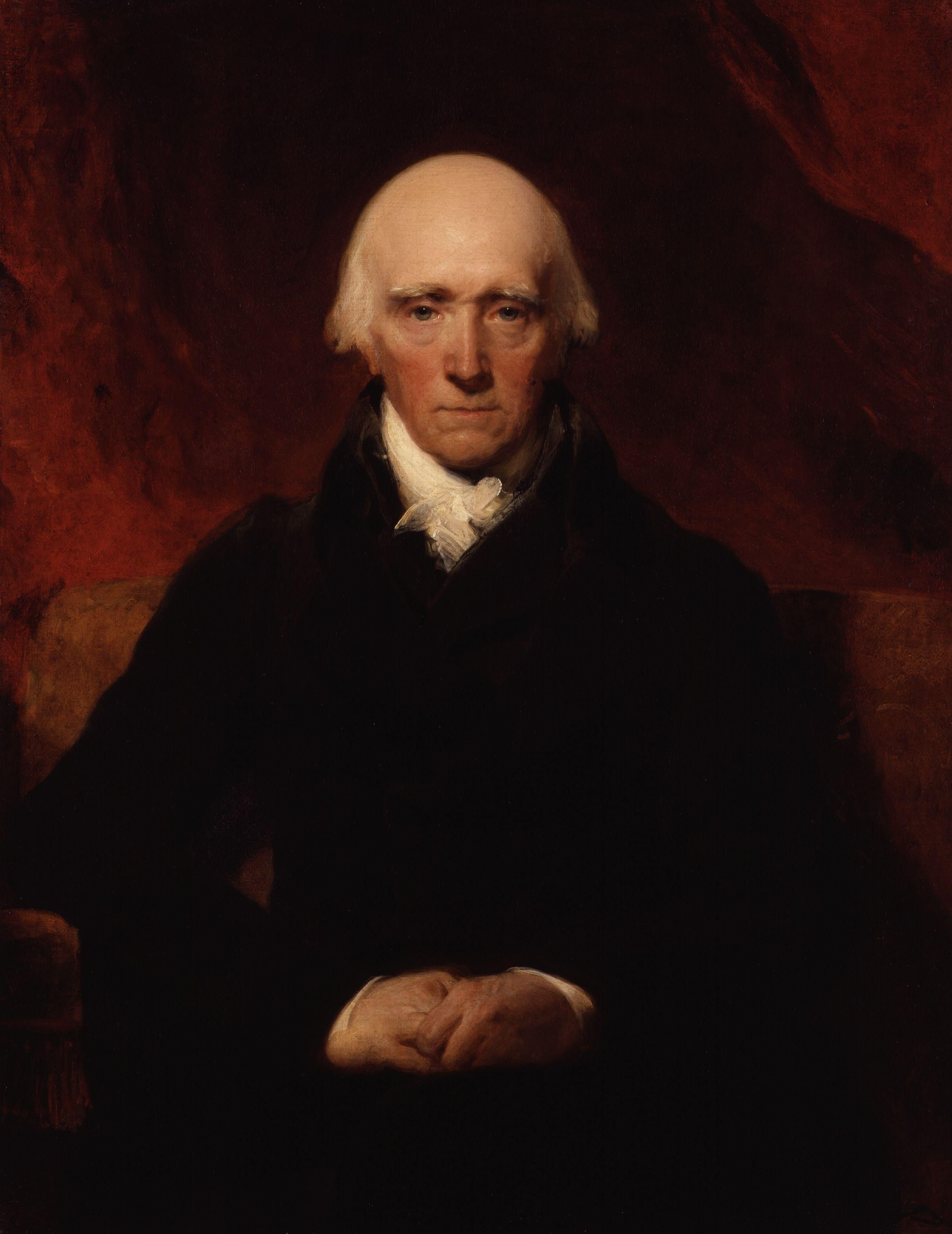
Warren Hastings, 1811

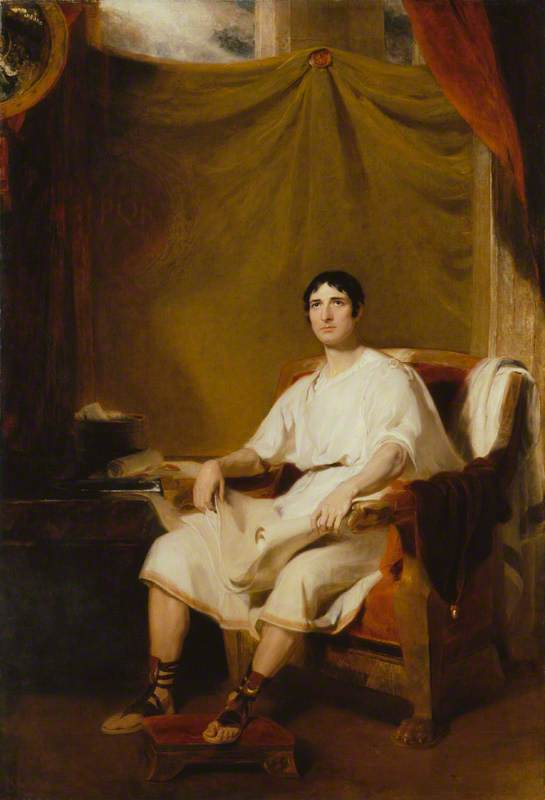
John Philip Kemble as Cato, 1812

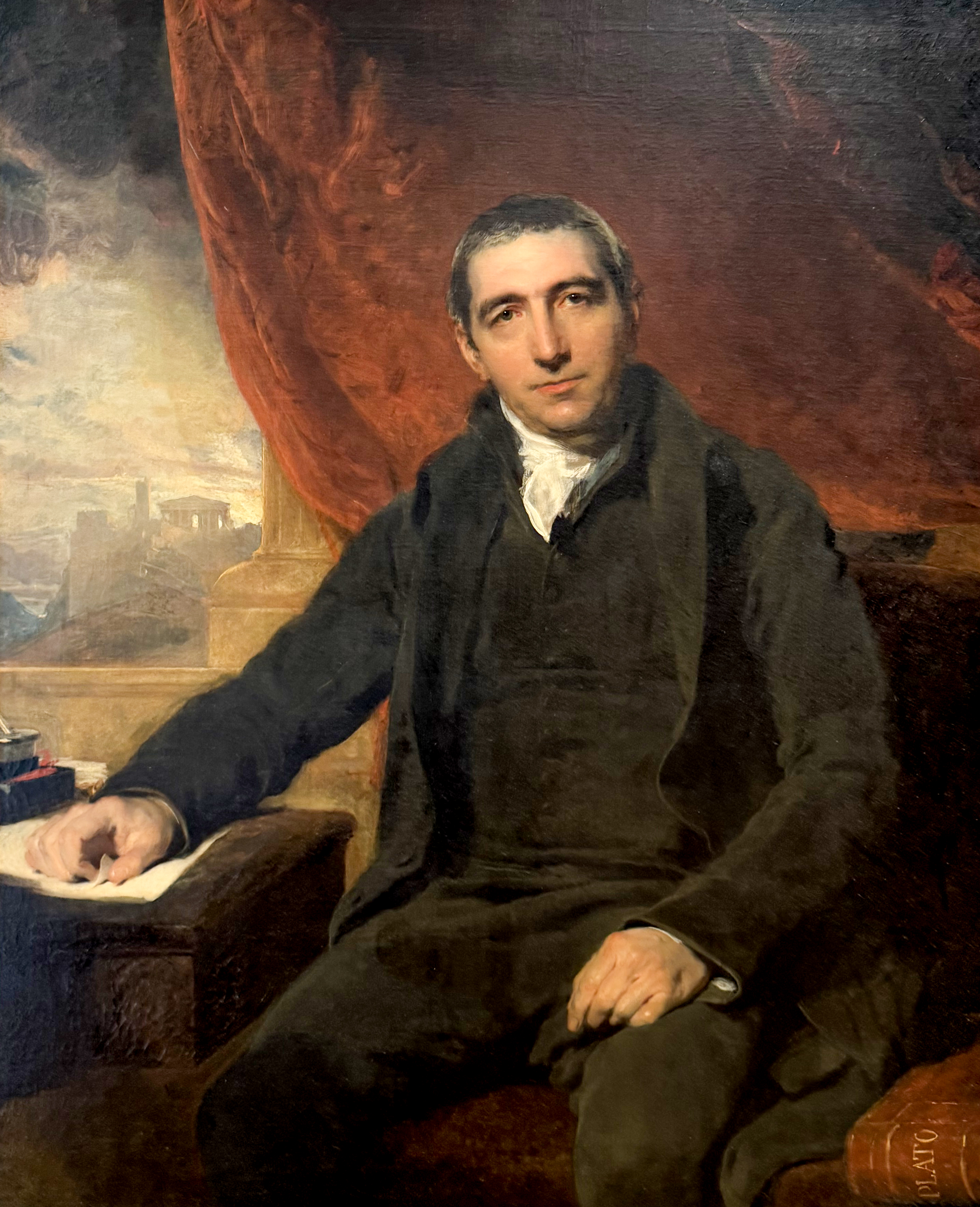
Thomas Taylor, 1812

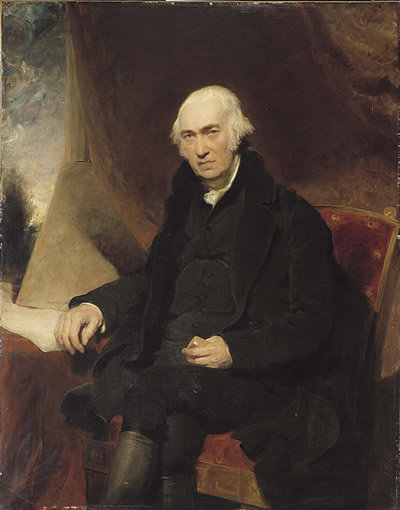
Portrait of James Watt, 1813

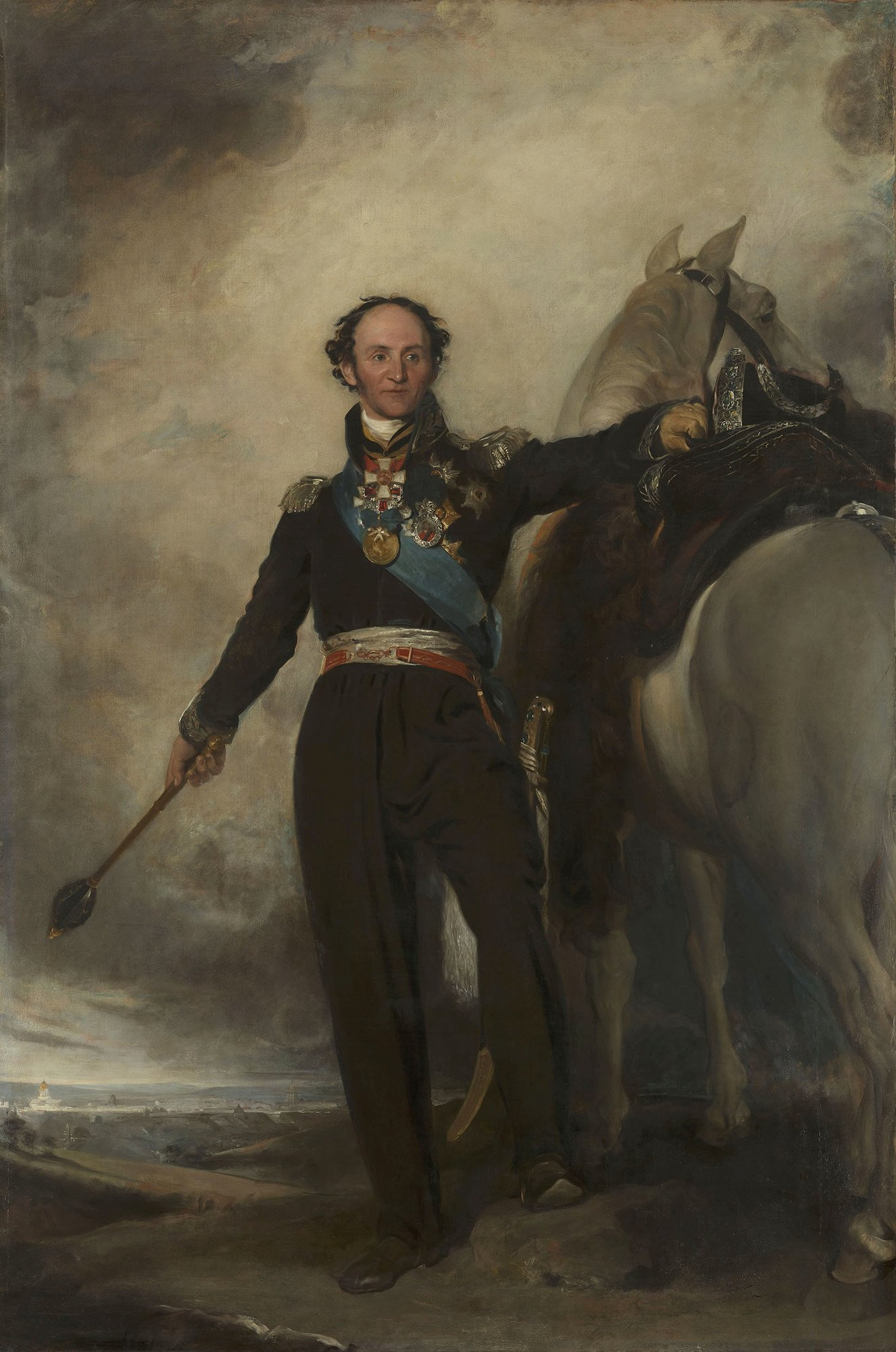
Count Matvei Platov, 1814

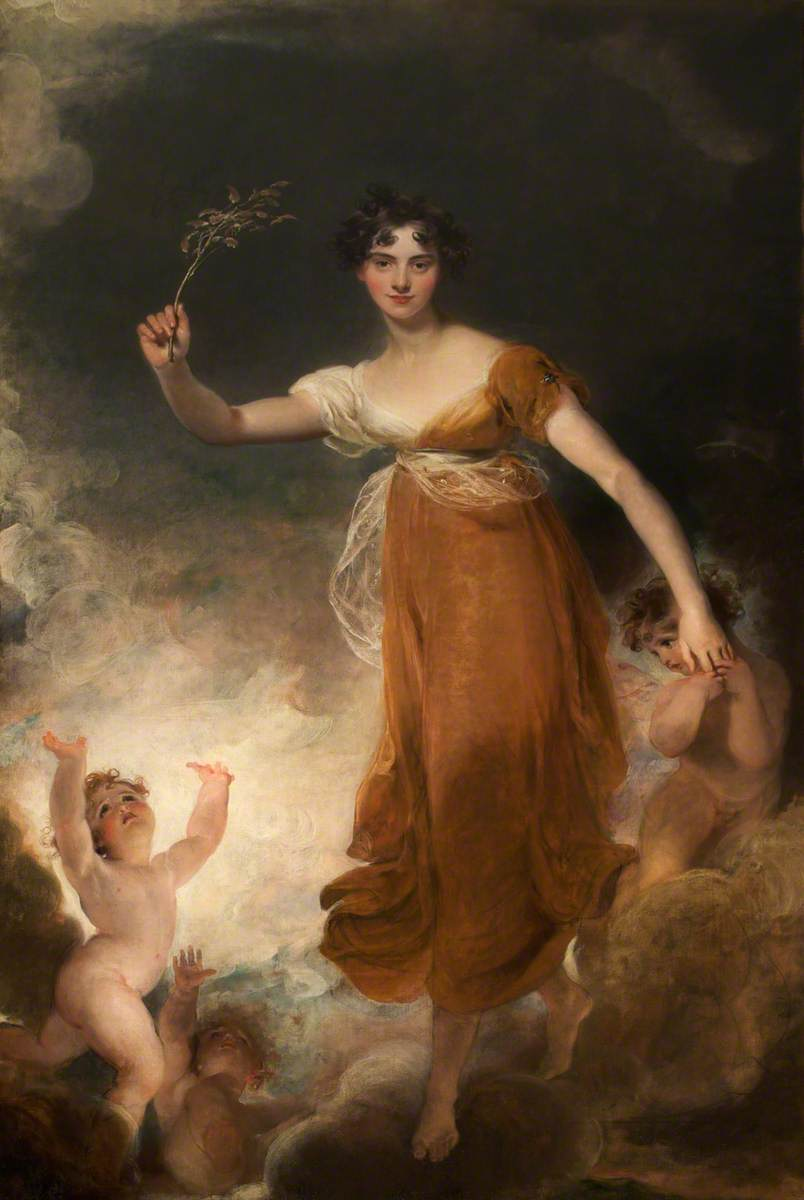
Lady Leicester as Hope, 1814

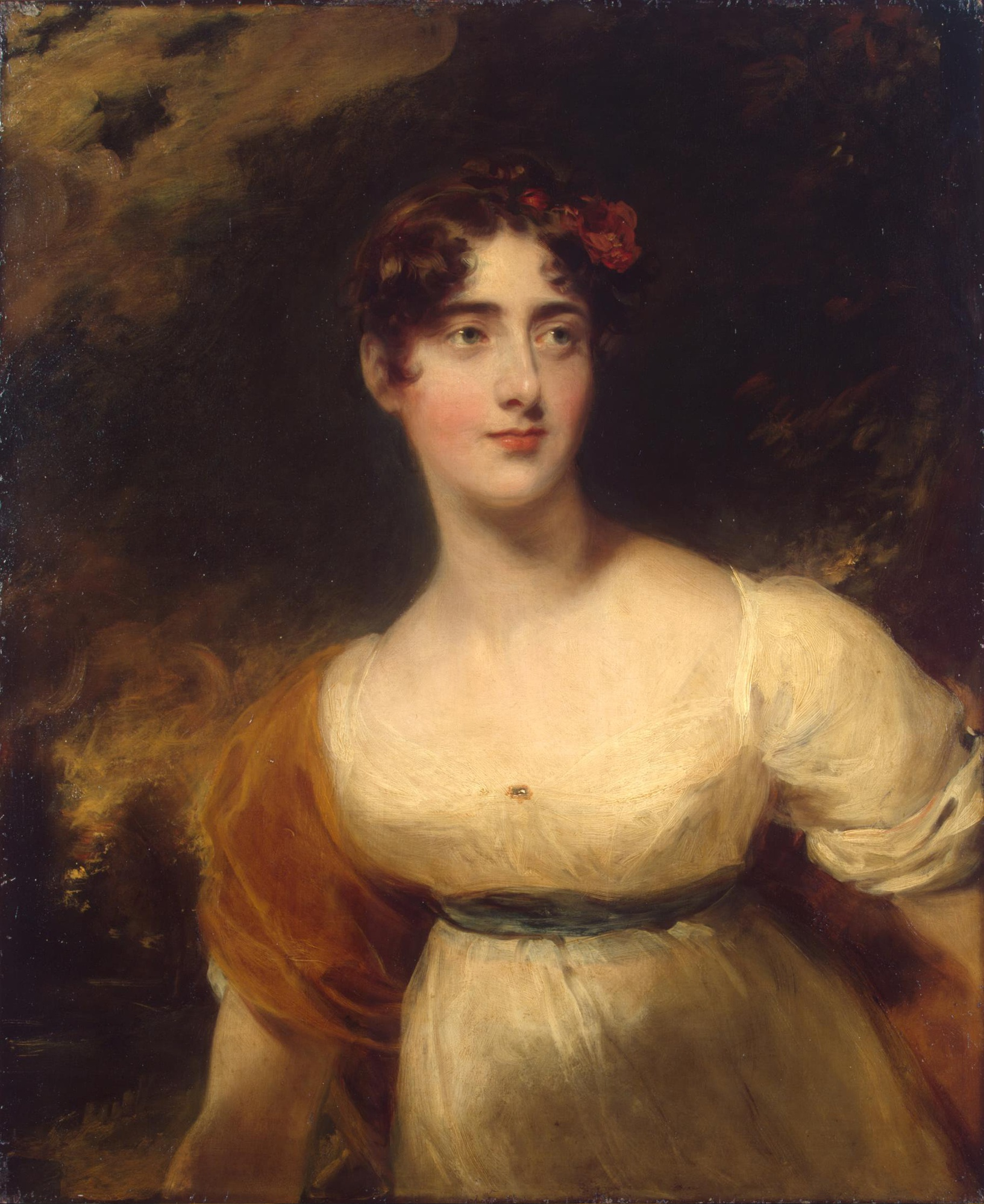
Emily Harriet Wellesley-Pole, Lady Raglan, c.1815

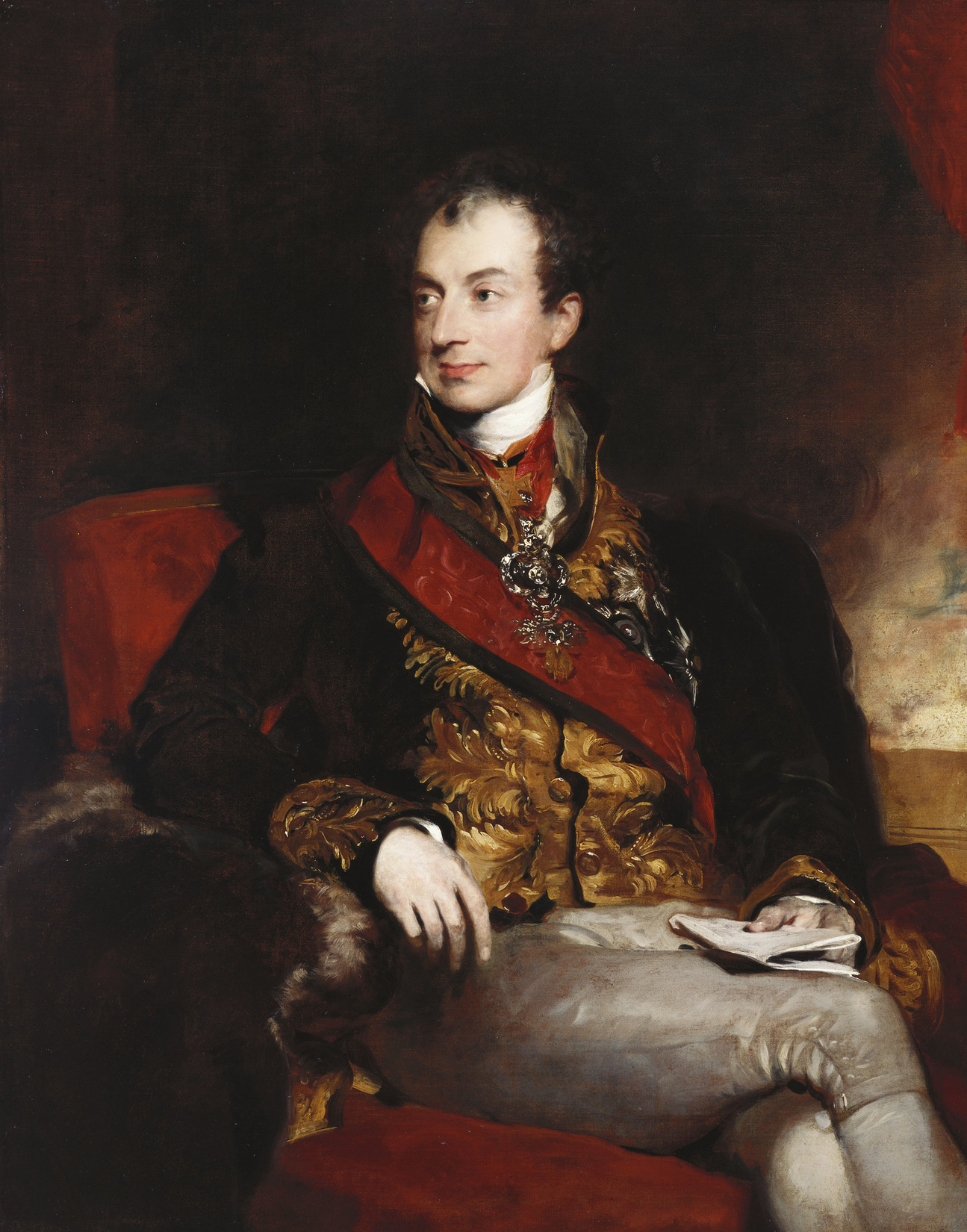
Portrait of Prince Metternich, 1815

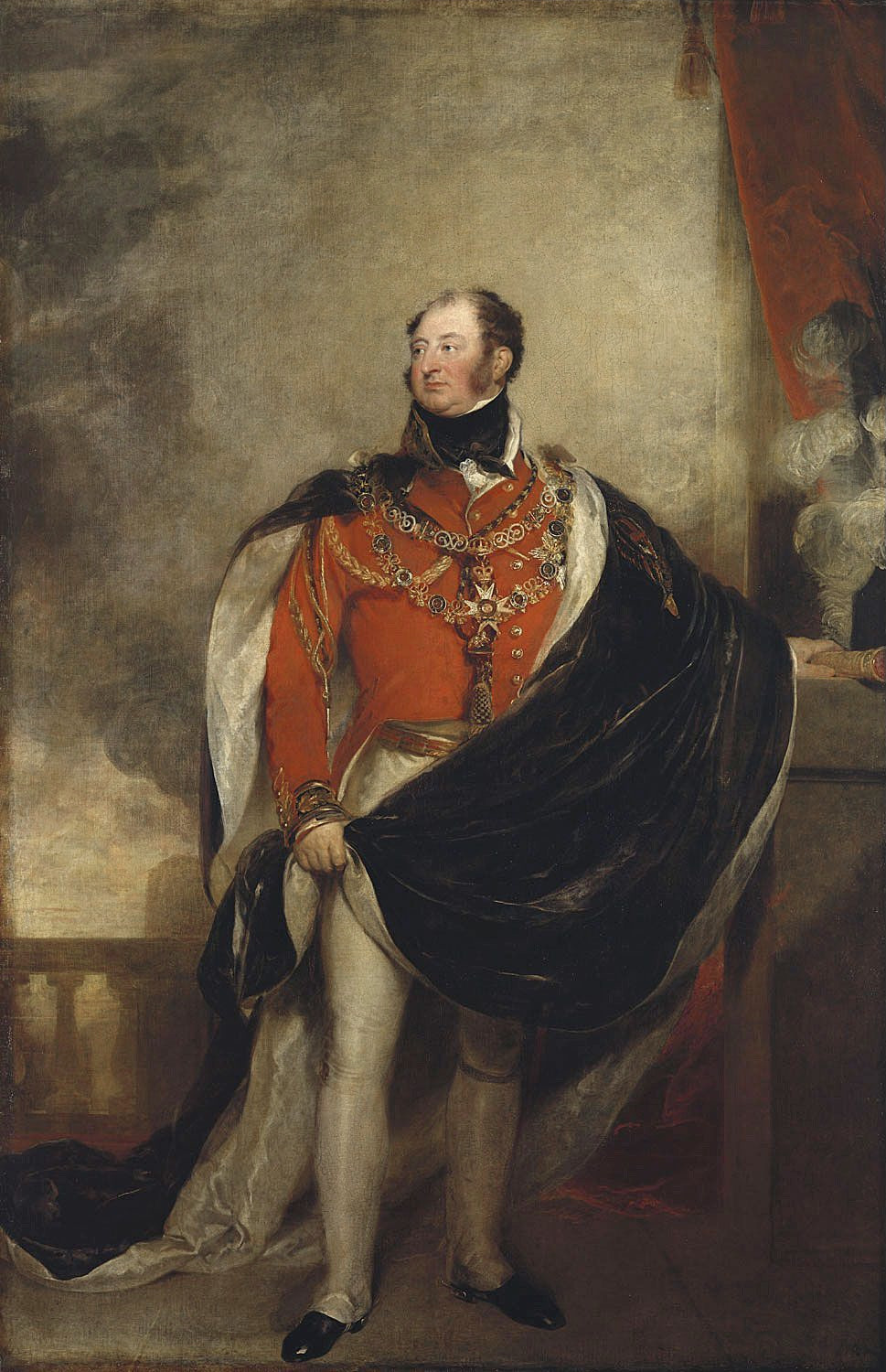
Portrait of the Duke of York, 1816

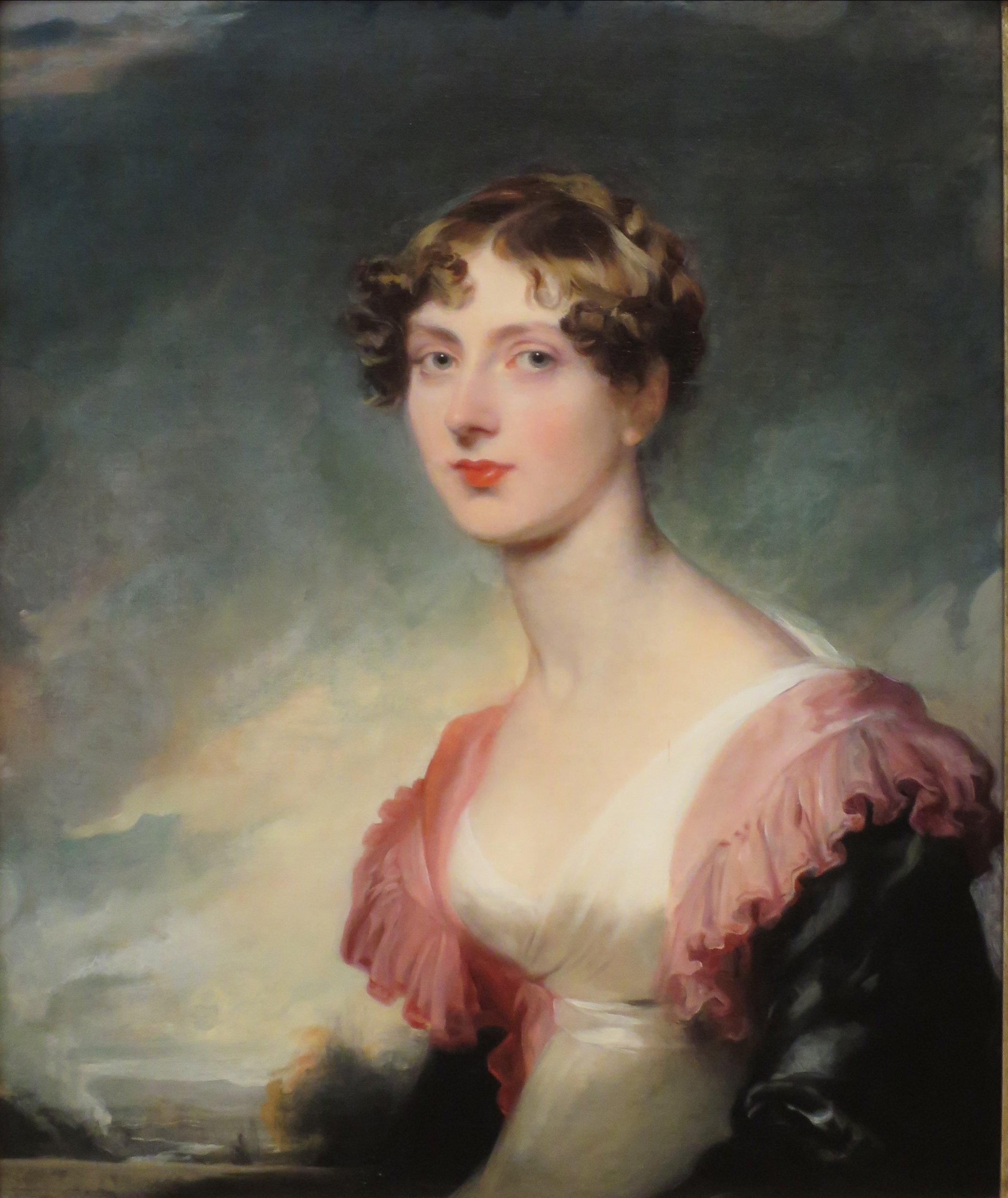
Portrait of the Countess of Plymouth, 1817

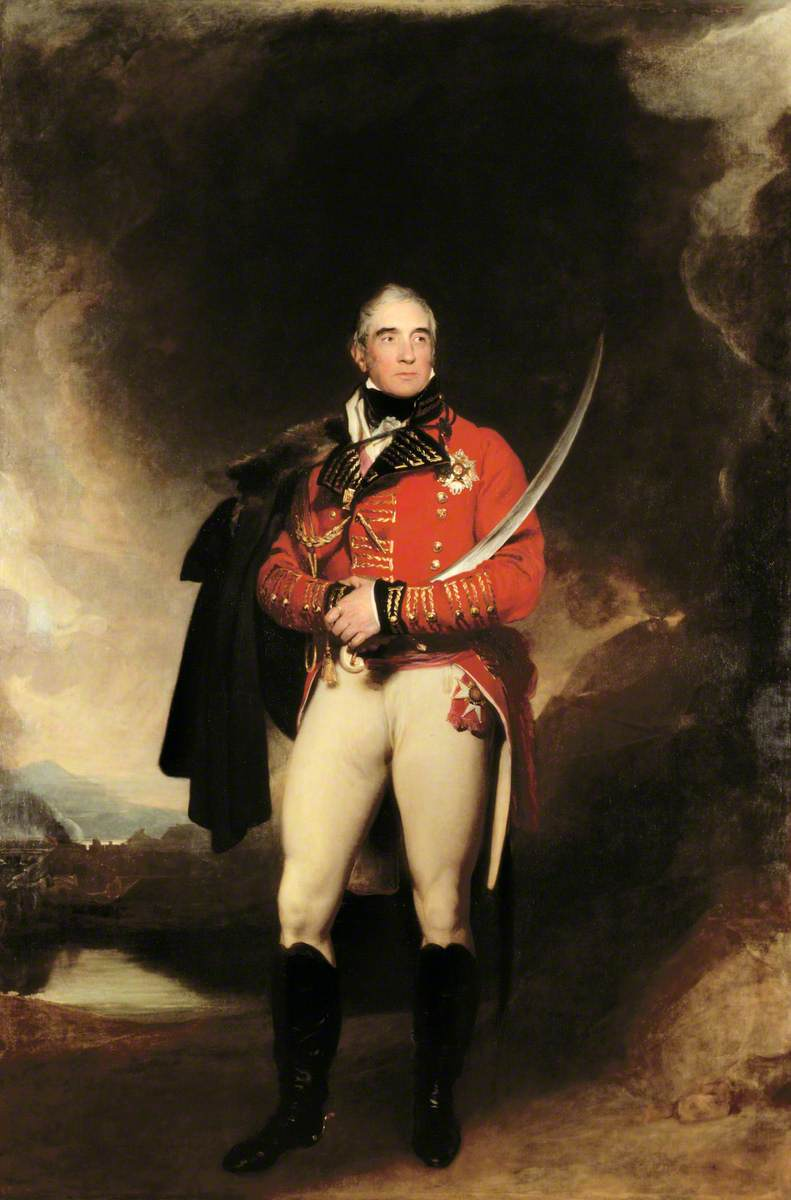
Portrait of Thomas Graham, 1817

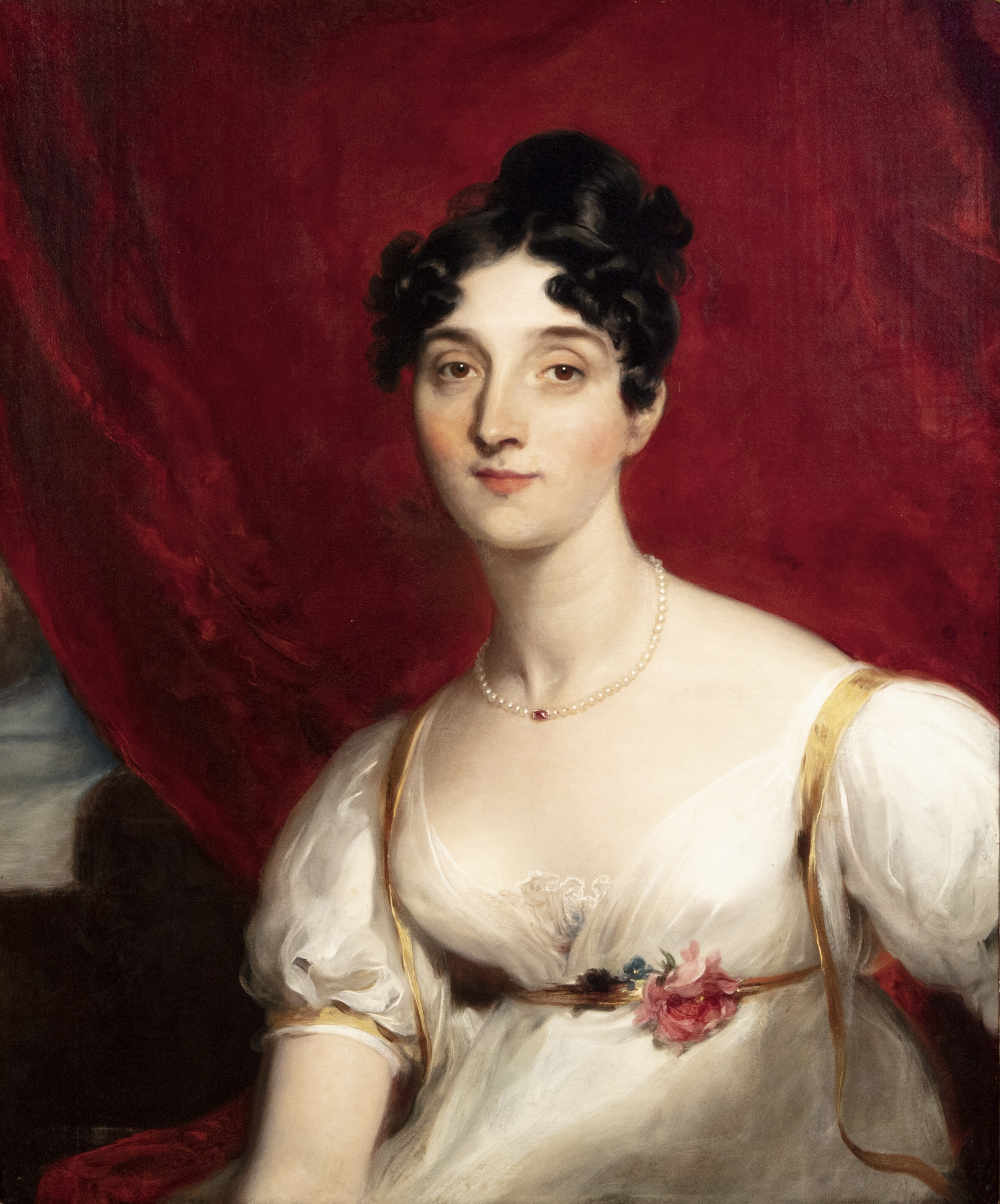
Marianne Wellesley, Marchioness Wellesley, 1817–1825

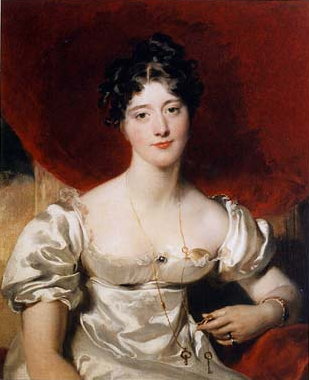
Portrait of Frances Vane, 1818

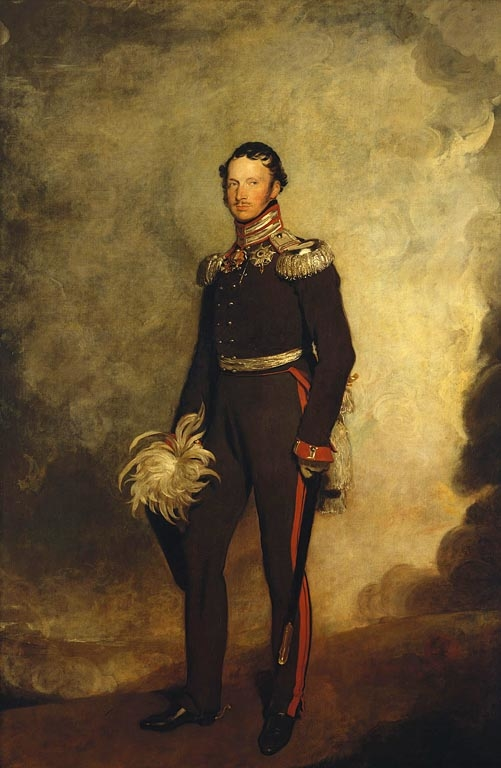
Portrait of Frederick William III of Prussia, 1818

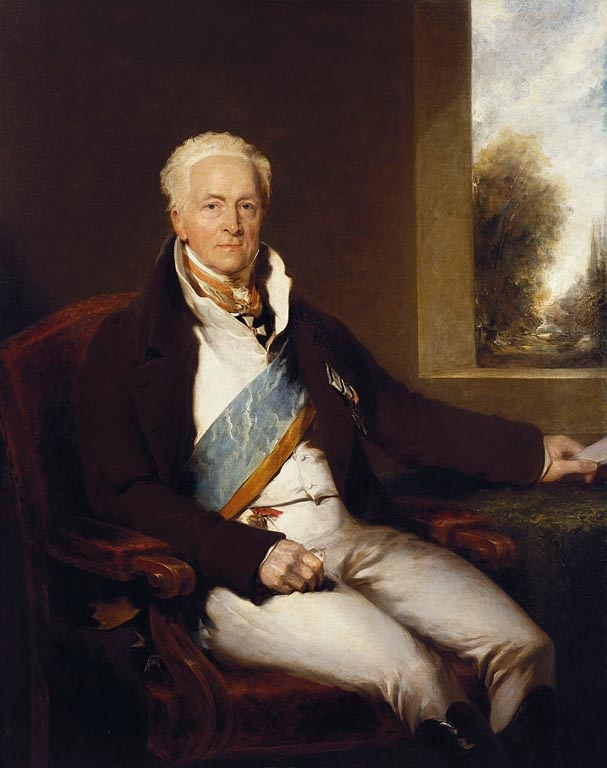
Portrait of Karl von Hardenberg, 1818

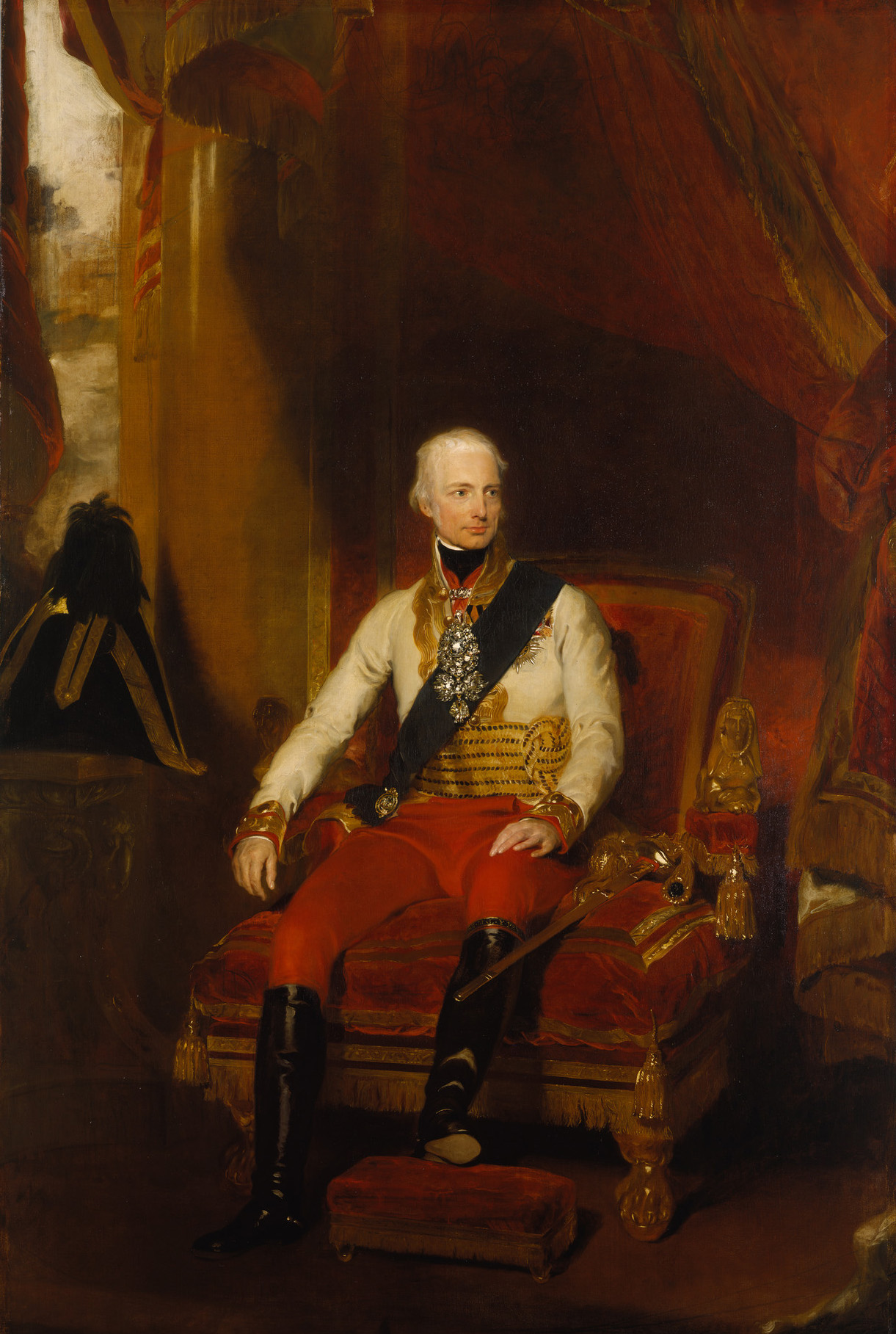
Portrait of Francis I of Austria, 1819

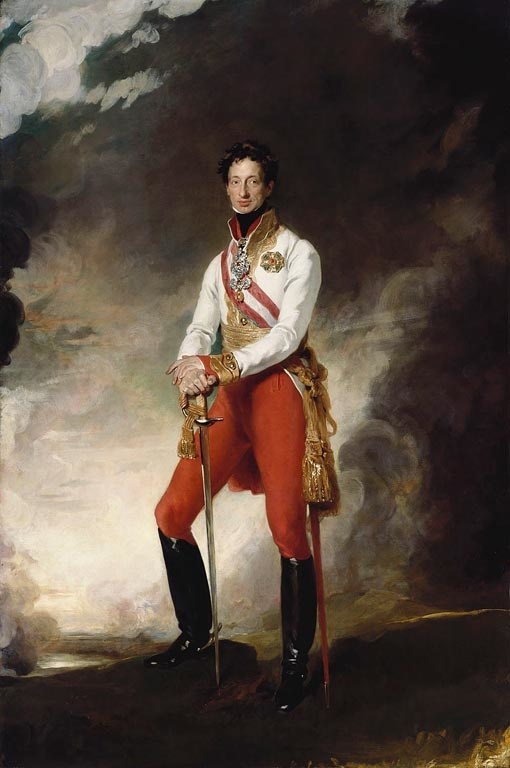
Portrait of Archduke Charles, 1819

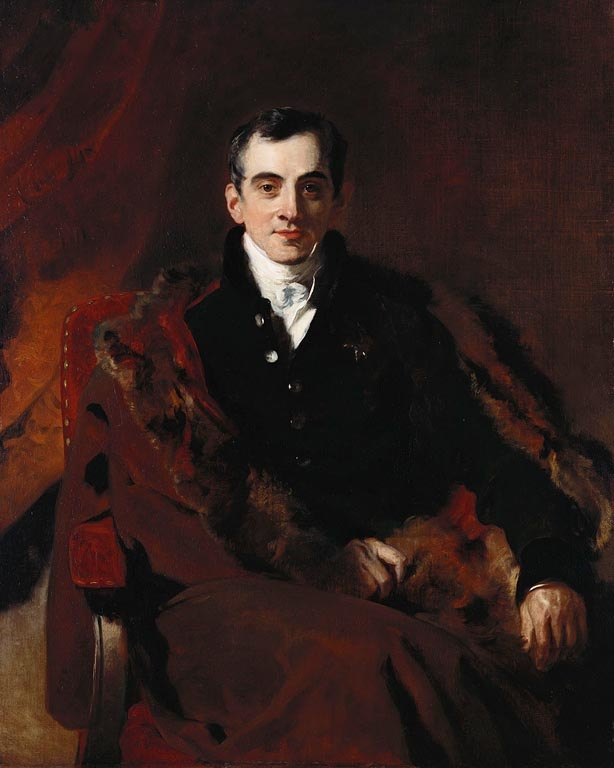
Count John Capo d'Istria, c.1819 Royal Collection

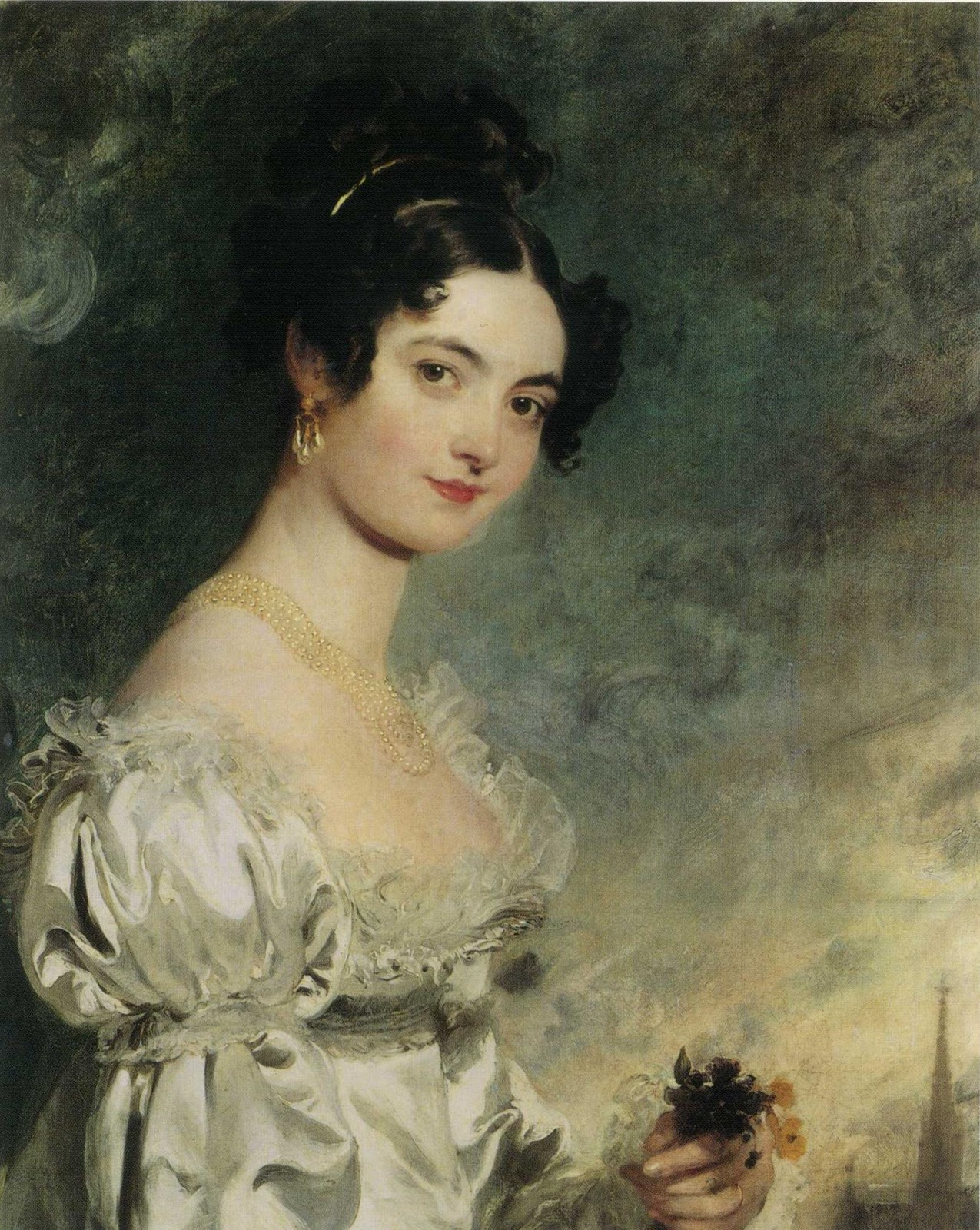
Lady Selina Meade, 1819.

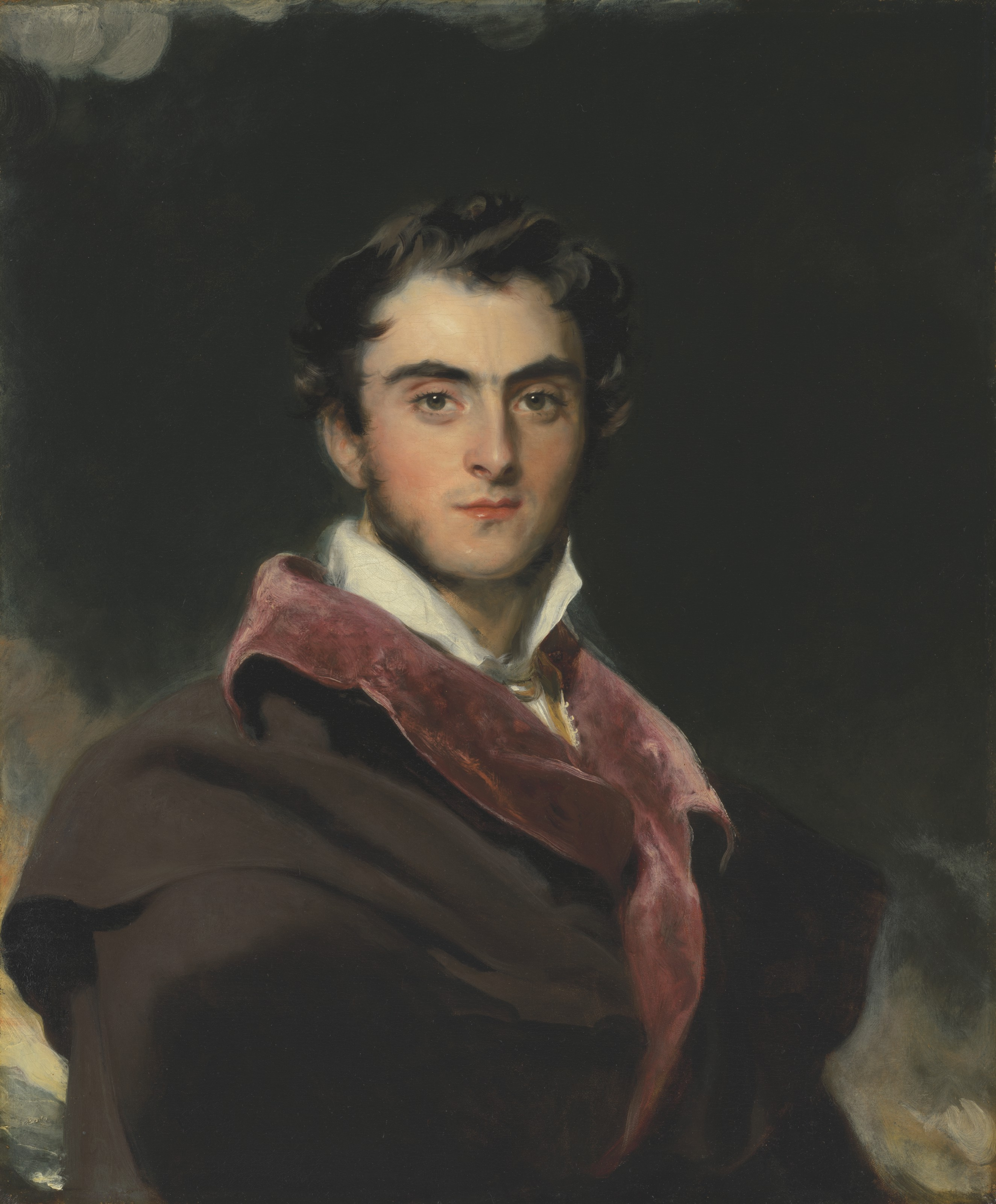
Portrait of Lord Clanwilliam, 1819

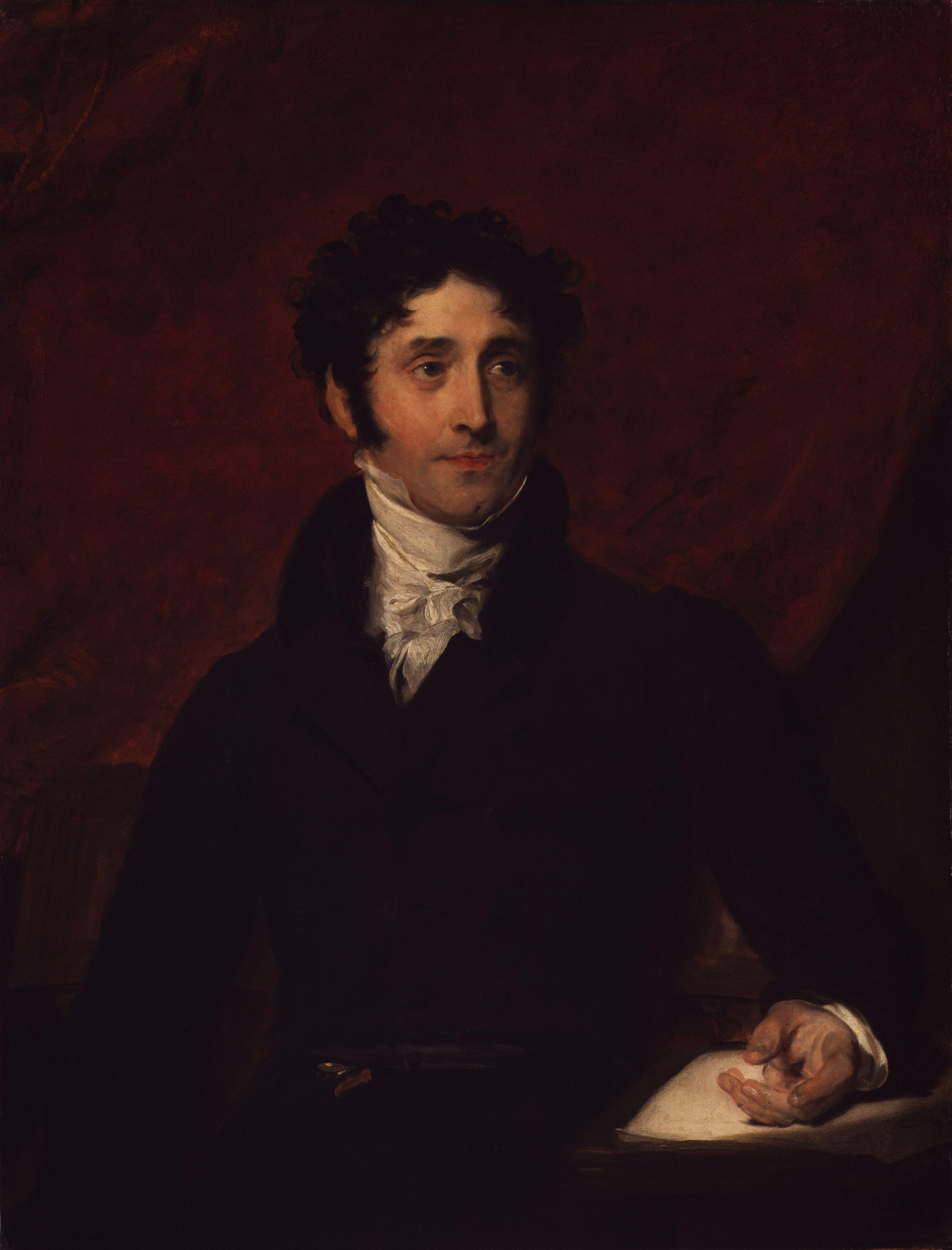
Portrait of Thomas Campbell, 1820

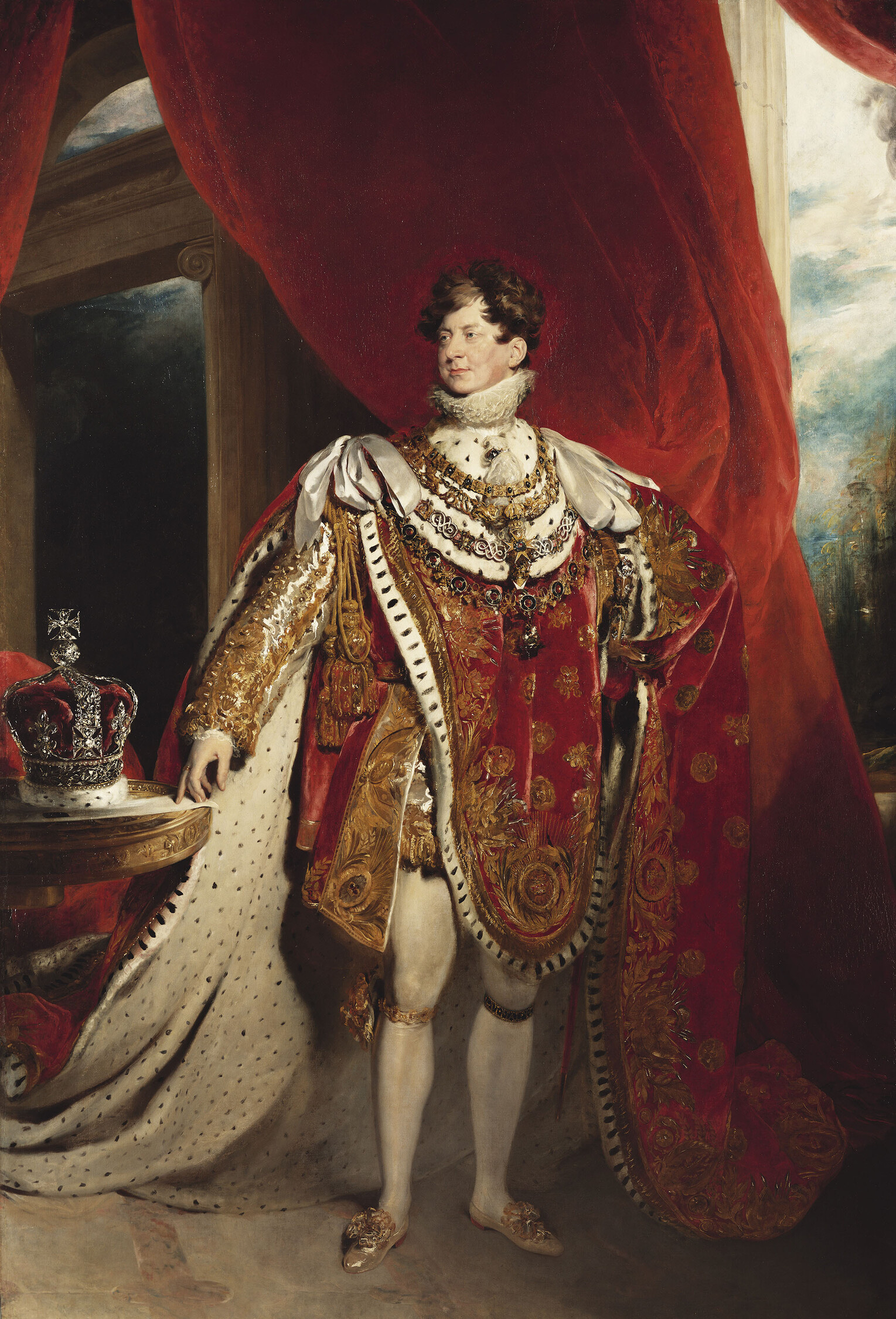
King George IV's Coronation Portrait, 1821

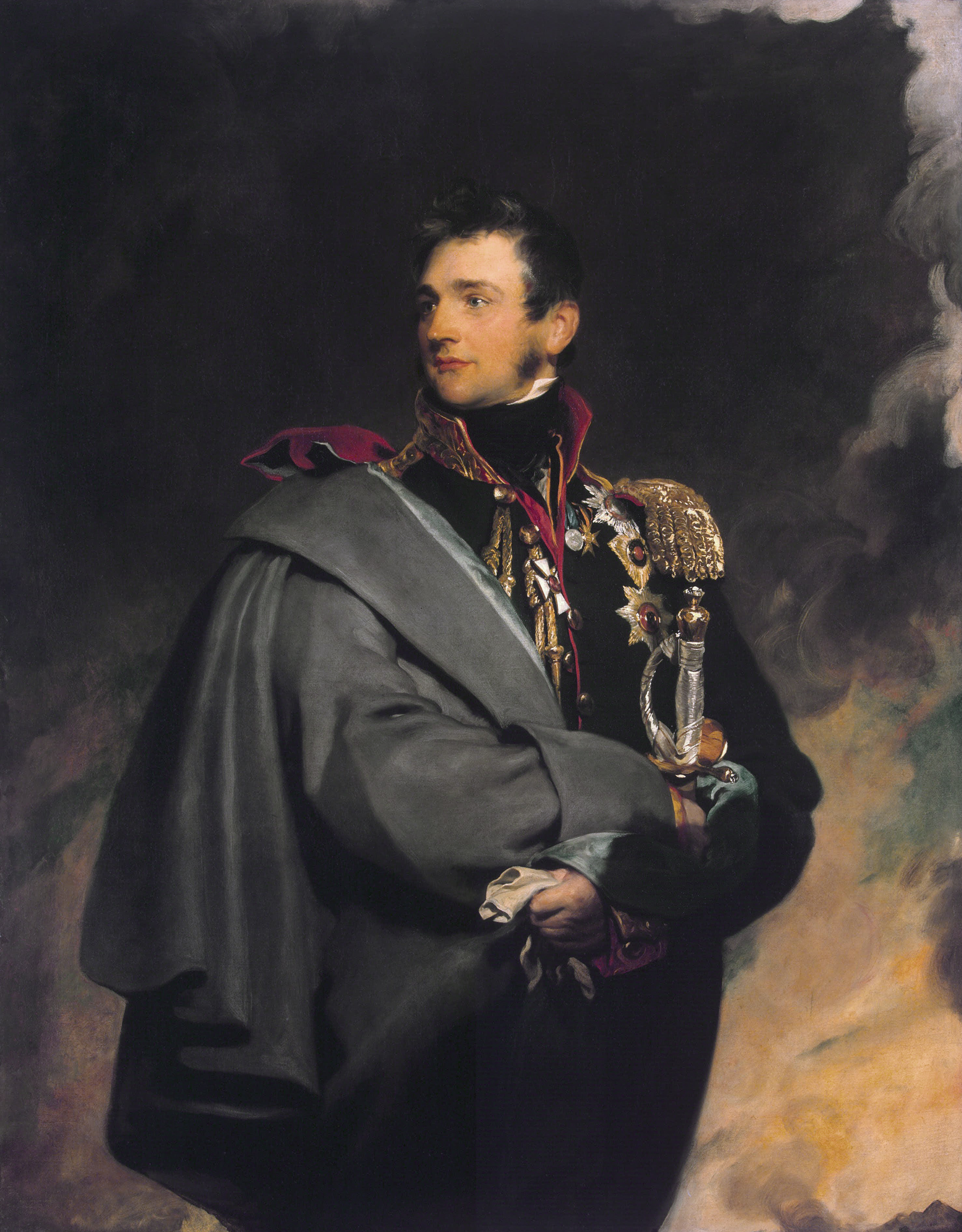
Portrait of Mikhail Vorontsov, 1821

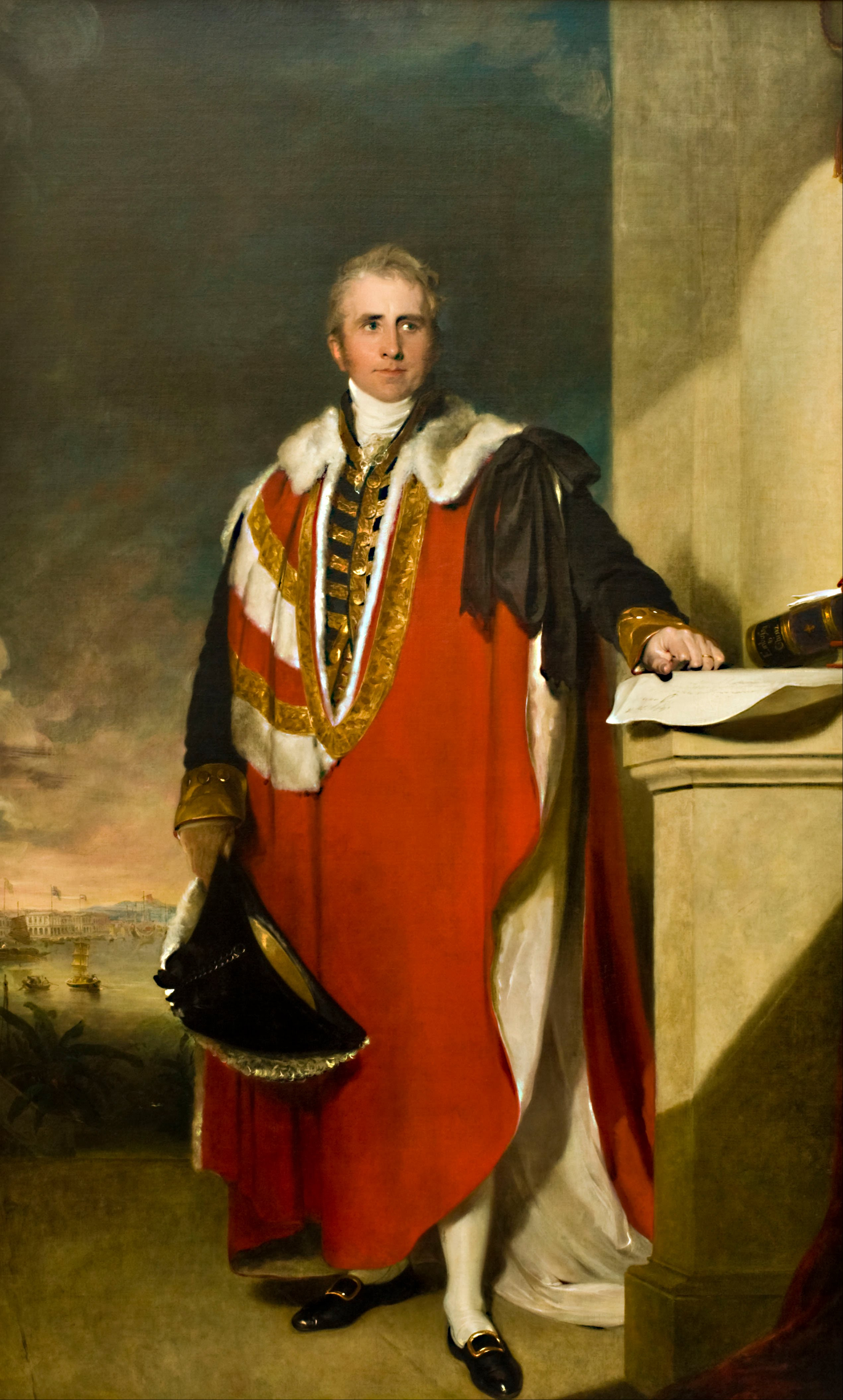
William Amherst, 1821

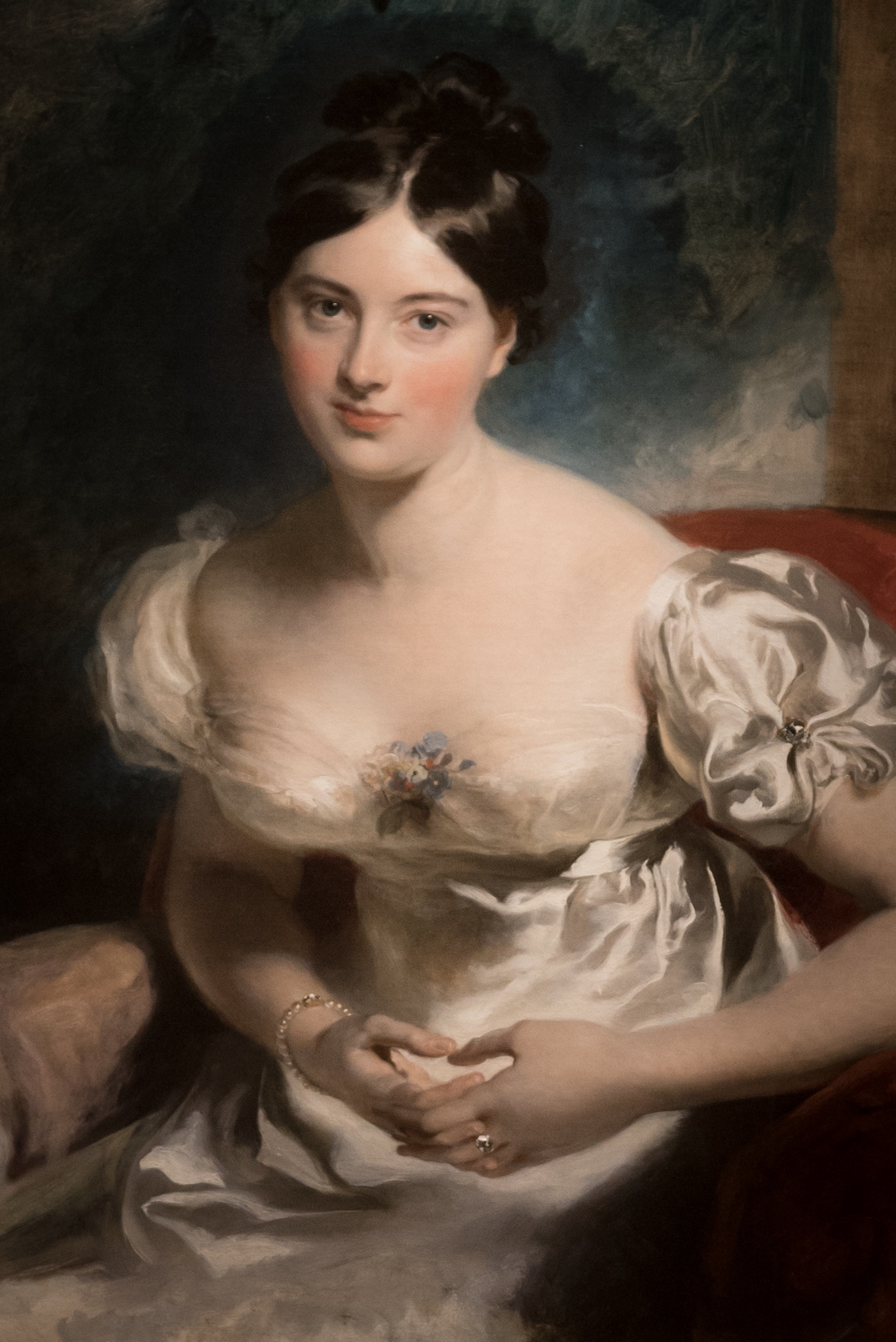
Portrait of the Countess of Blessington, 1822, Wallace Collection, London

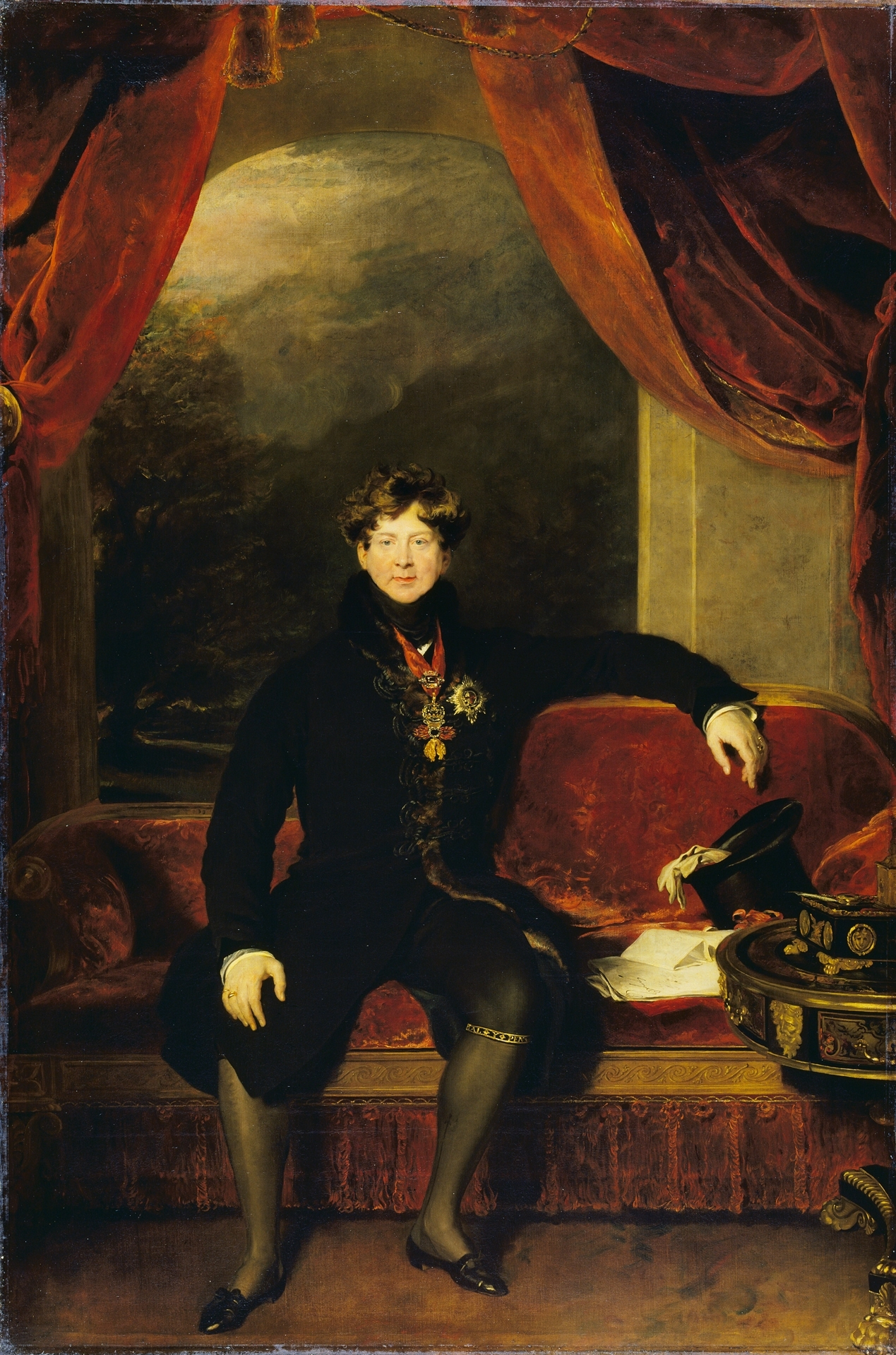
Portrait of George IV, 1822

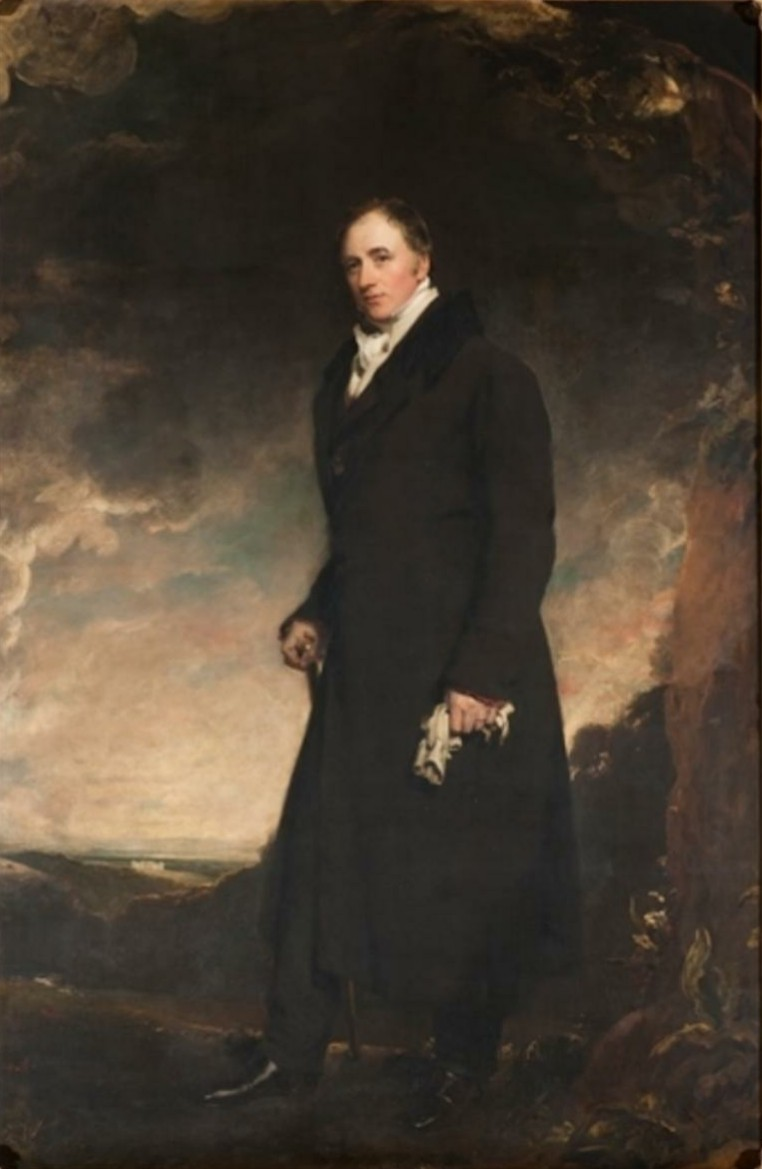
Earl of Harewood, 1823

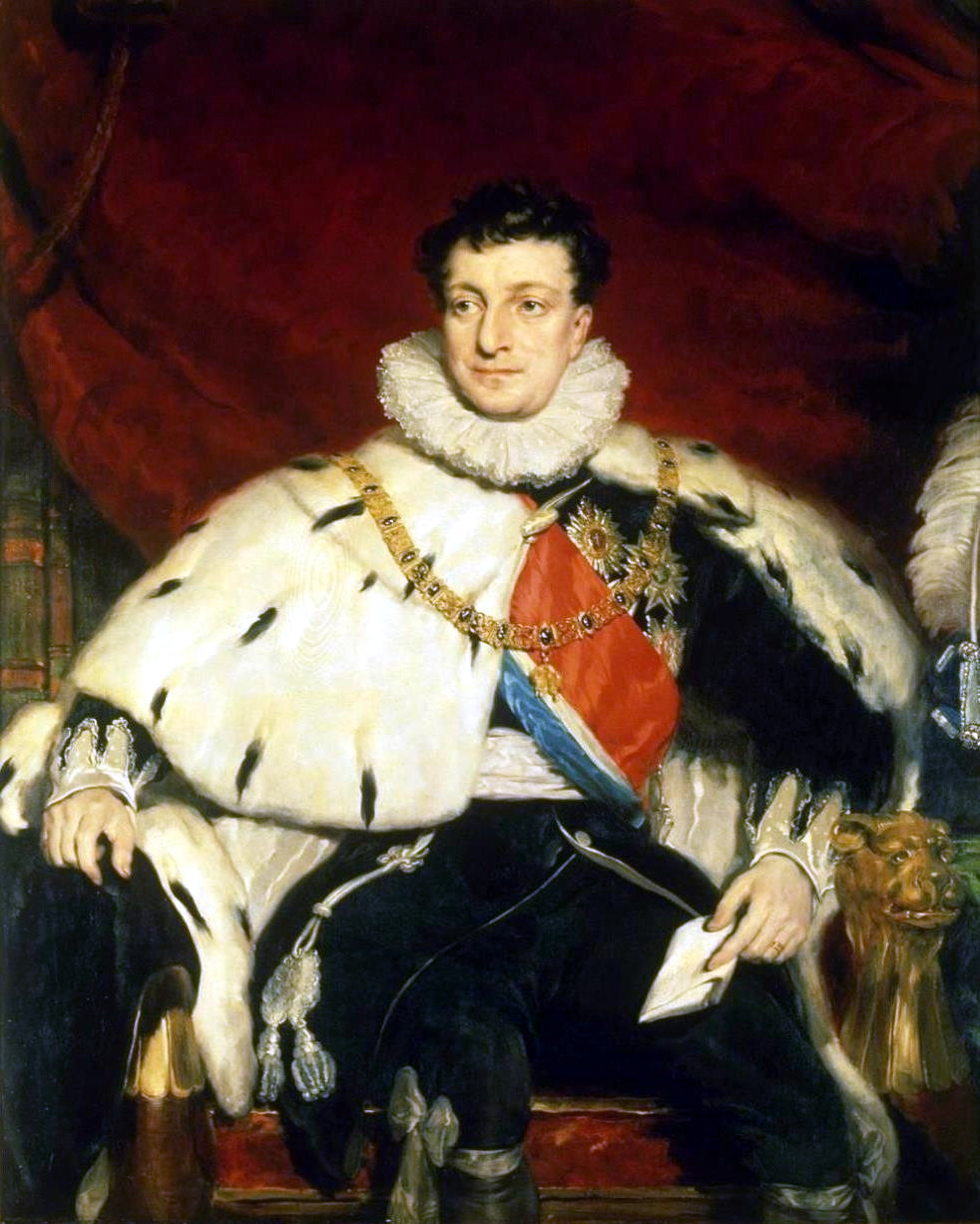
Duke of Palmela, c.1823

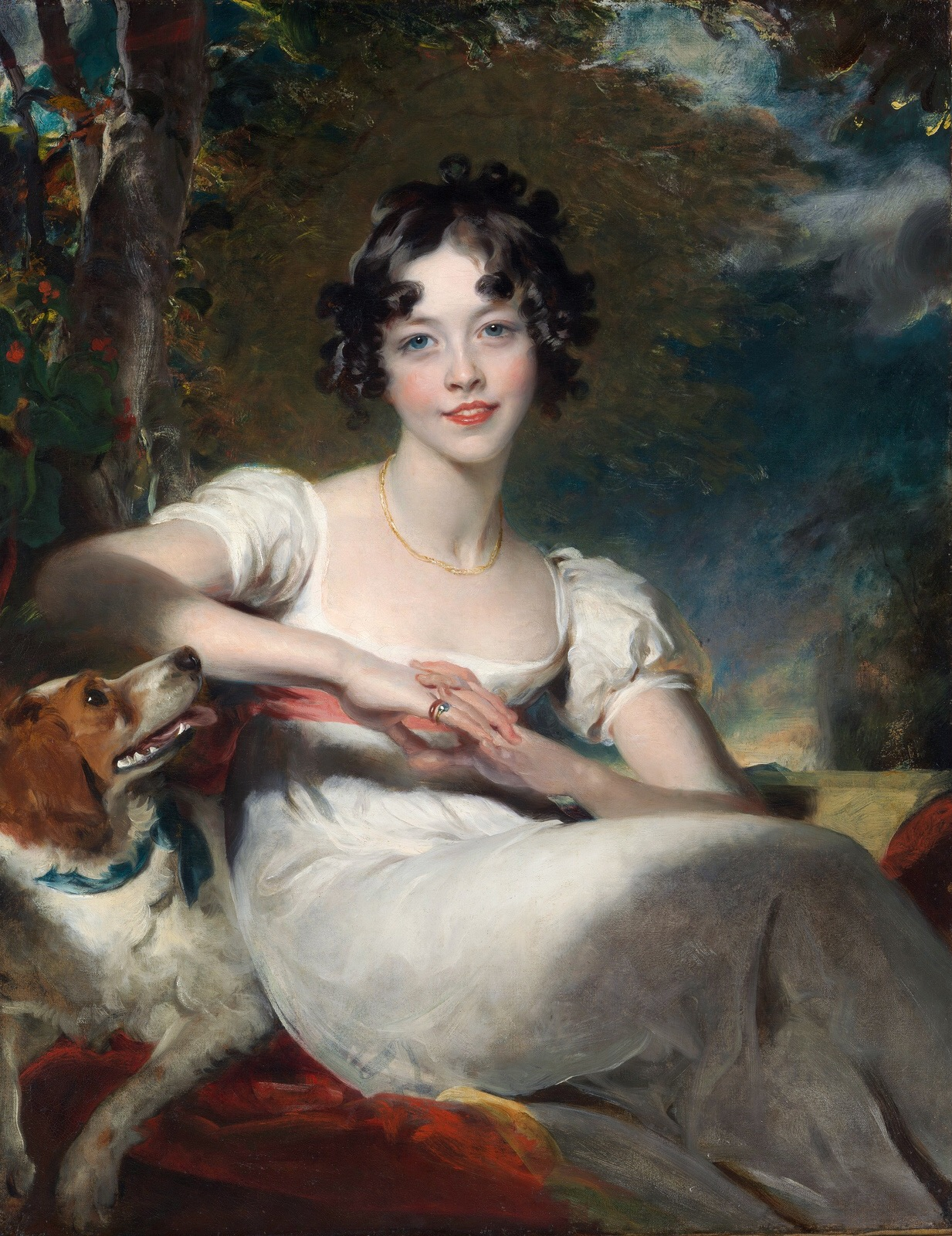
Portrait of Lady Maria Conyngham, 1825

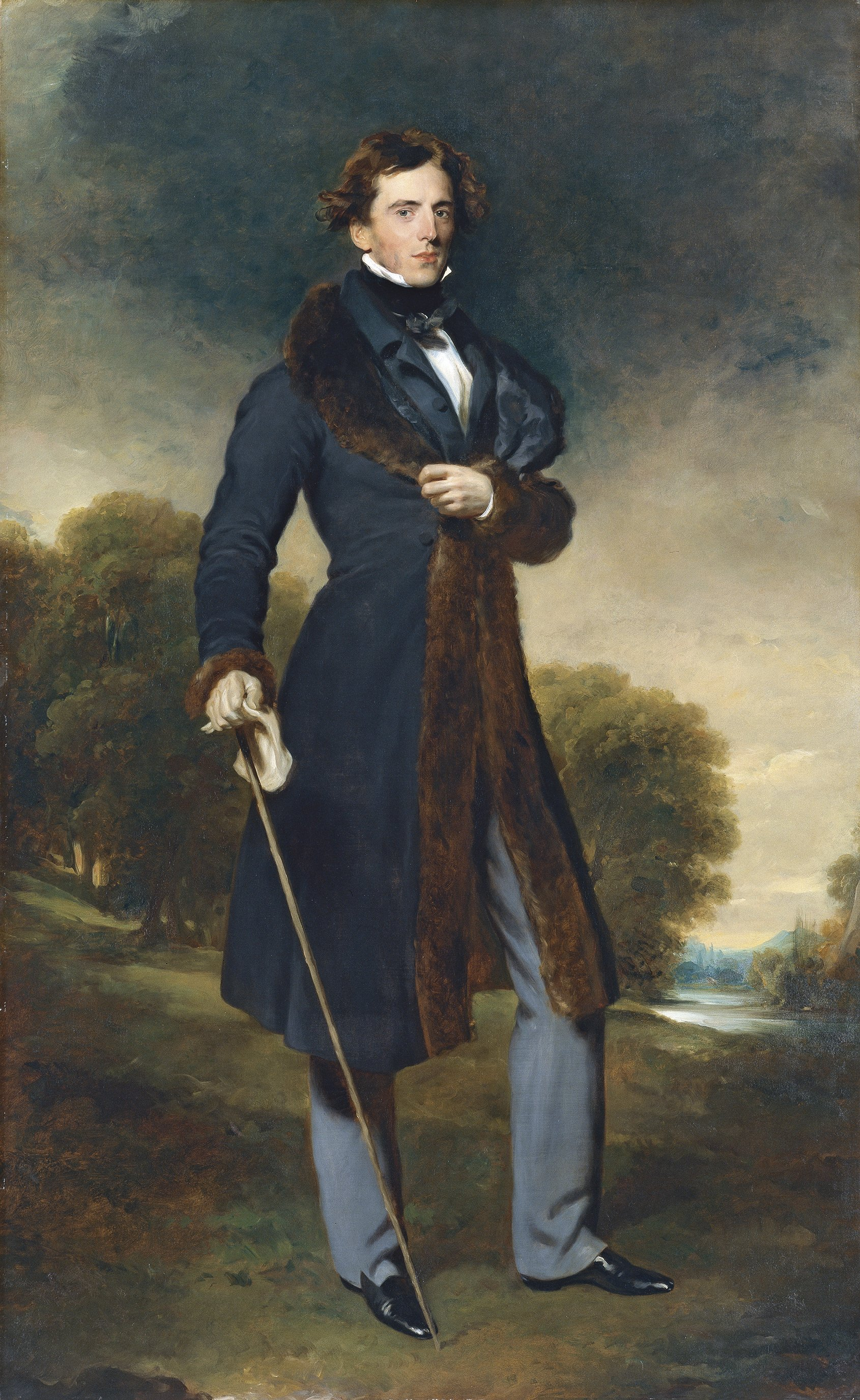
David Lyon, 1825, Thyssen-Bornemisza Museum, Madrid

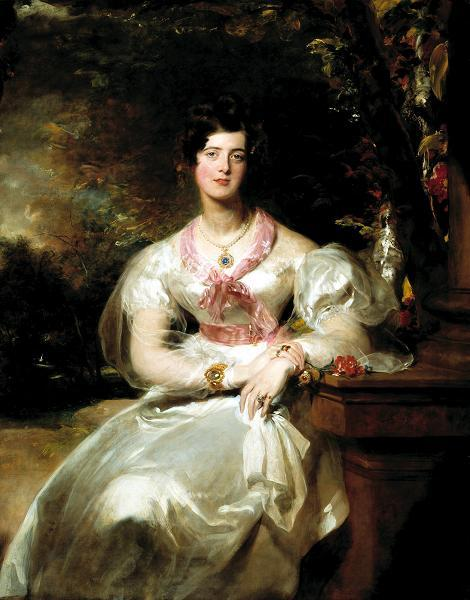
Portrait of the Honorable Mrs. Seymour Bathurst, 1828, Dallas Museum of Art

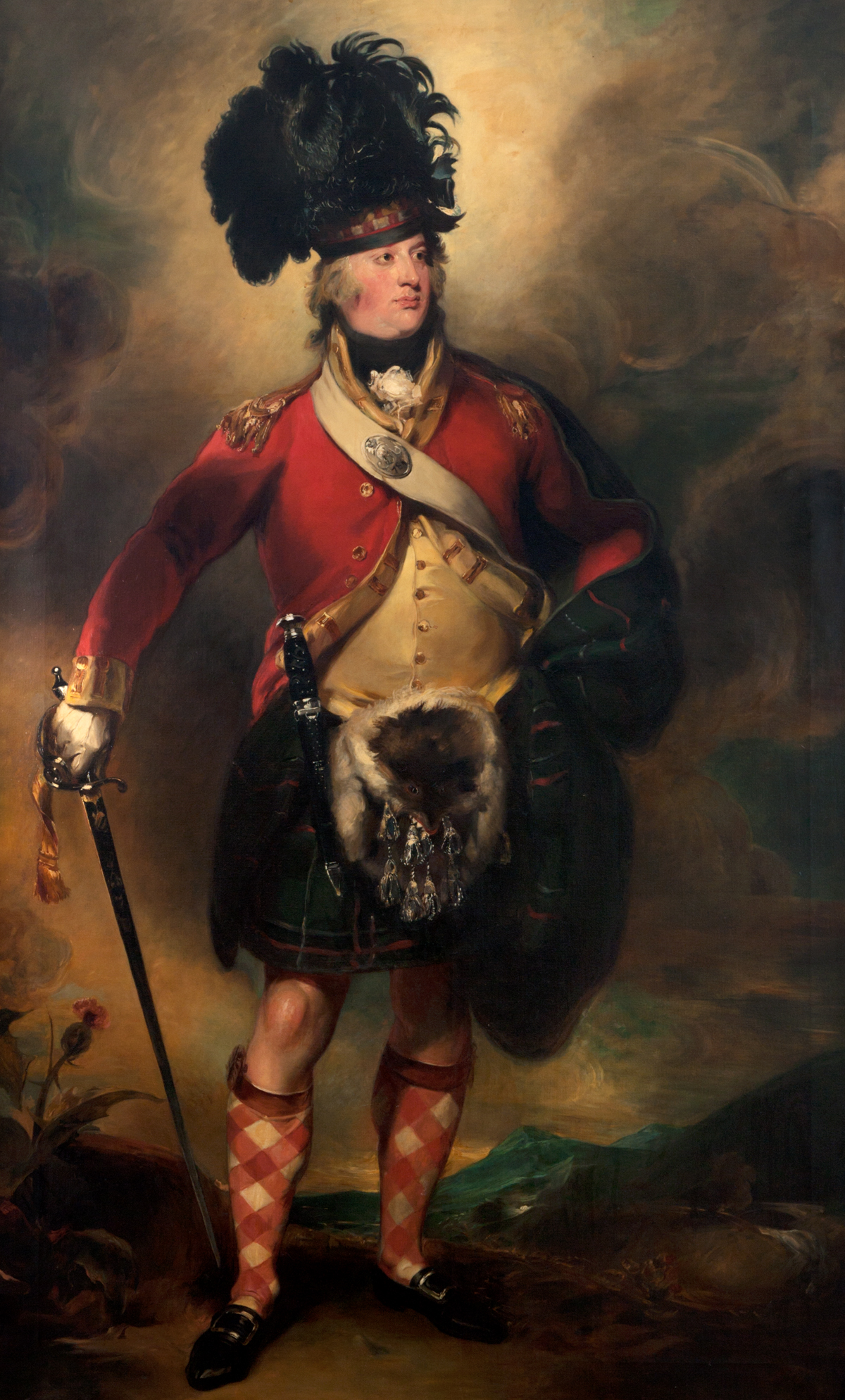
Francis Humberstone MacKenzie of the 78th Highlanders

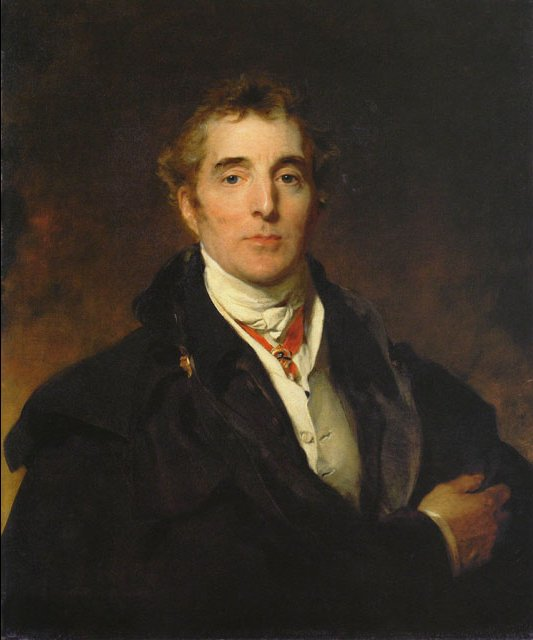
Arthur Wellesley, 1st Duke of Wellington

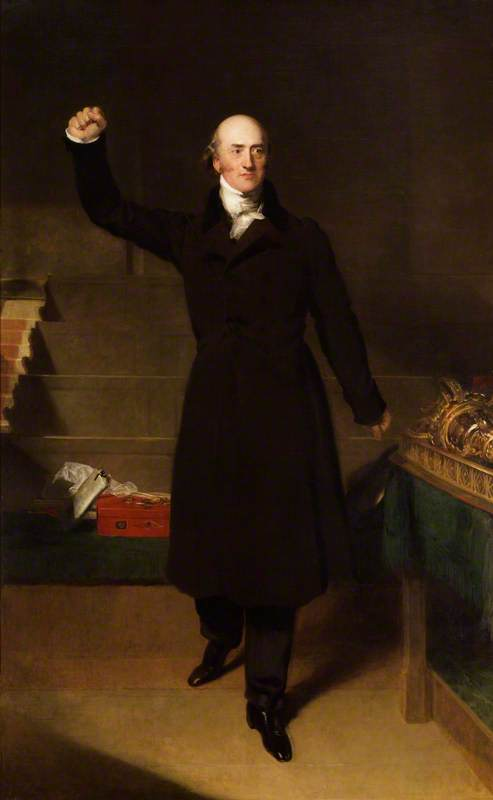
Portrait of George Canning, 1826

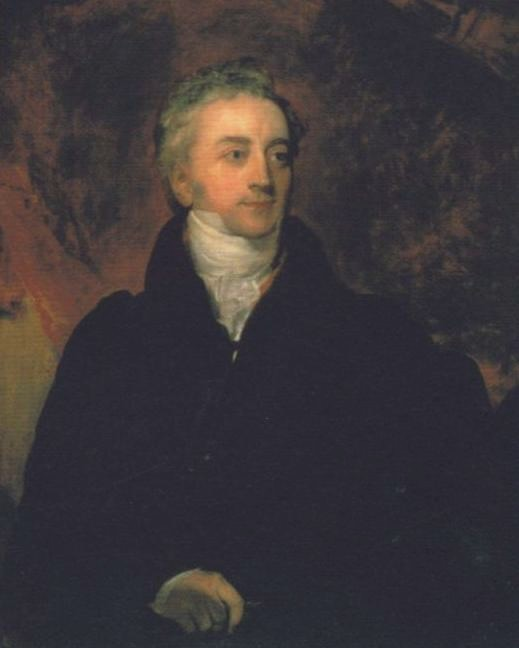
Portrait of Thomas Young, 1826

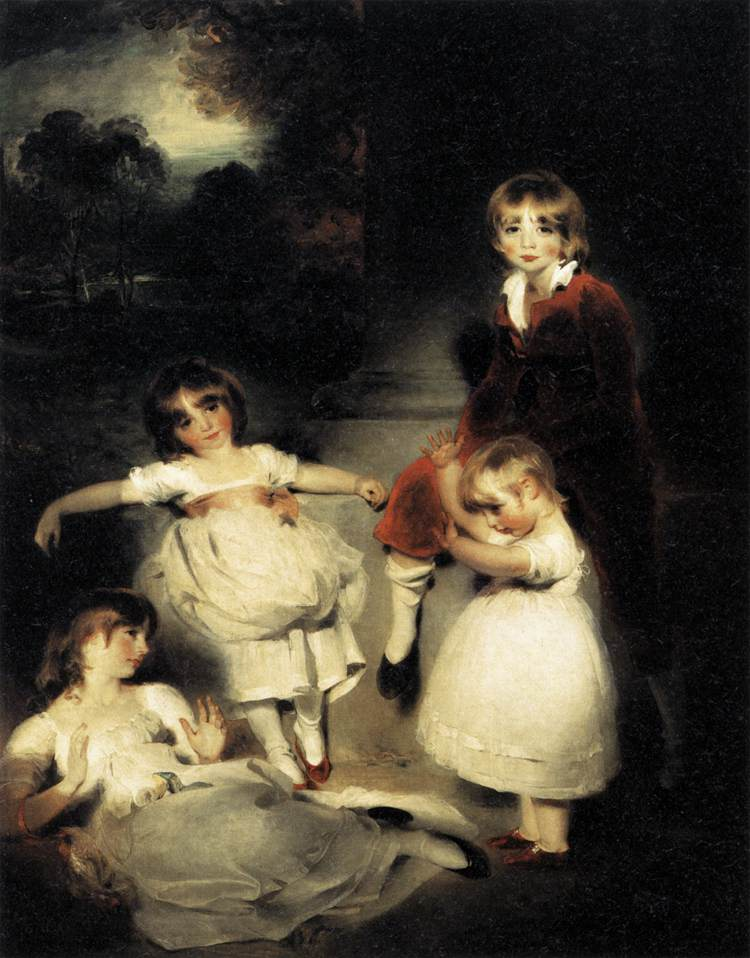
The Children of Ayscoghe Boucherett

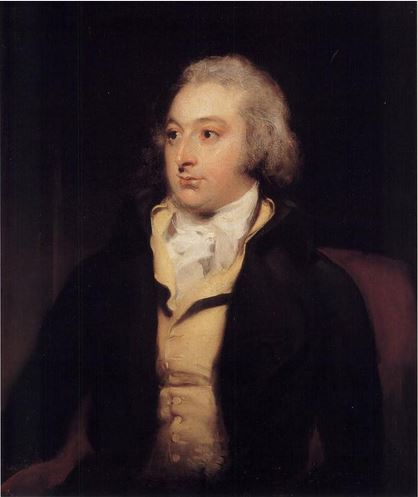
Abraham Redwood

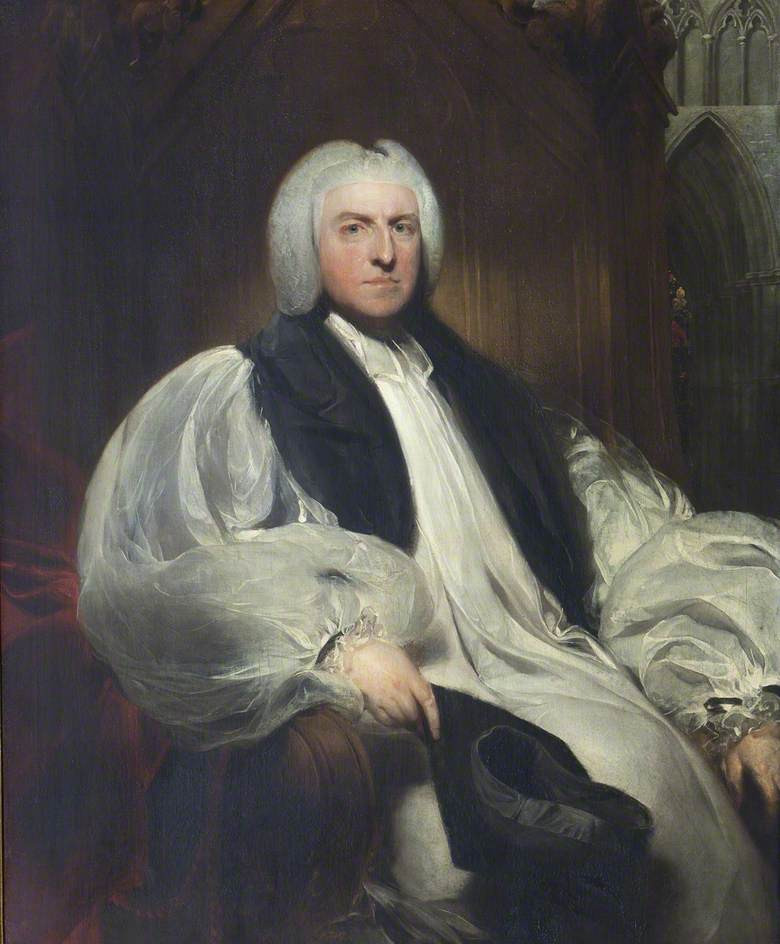
Shute Barrington (Merton College, Oxford)

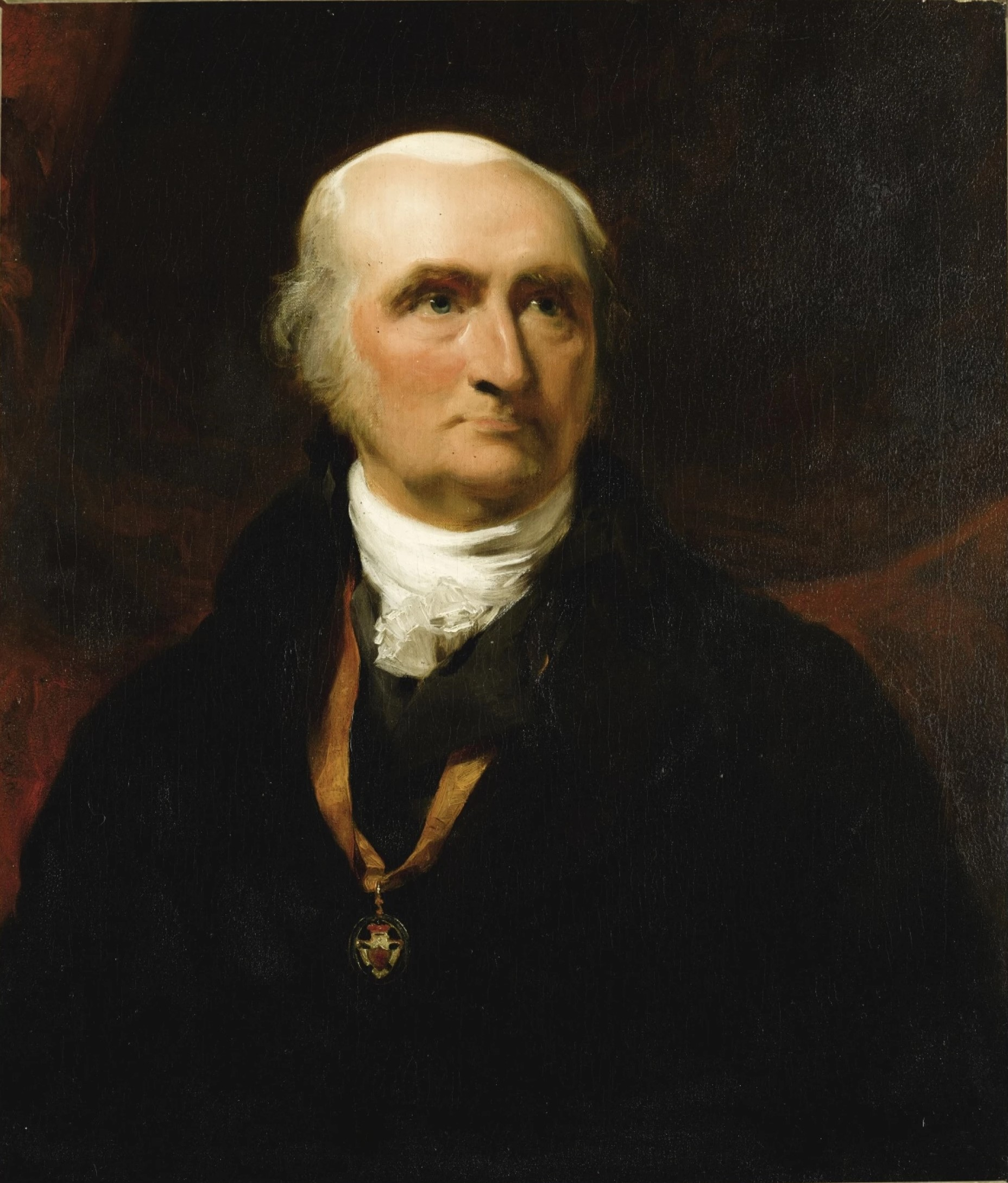
Sir William Forbes, 1803

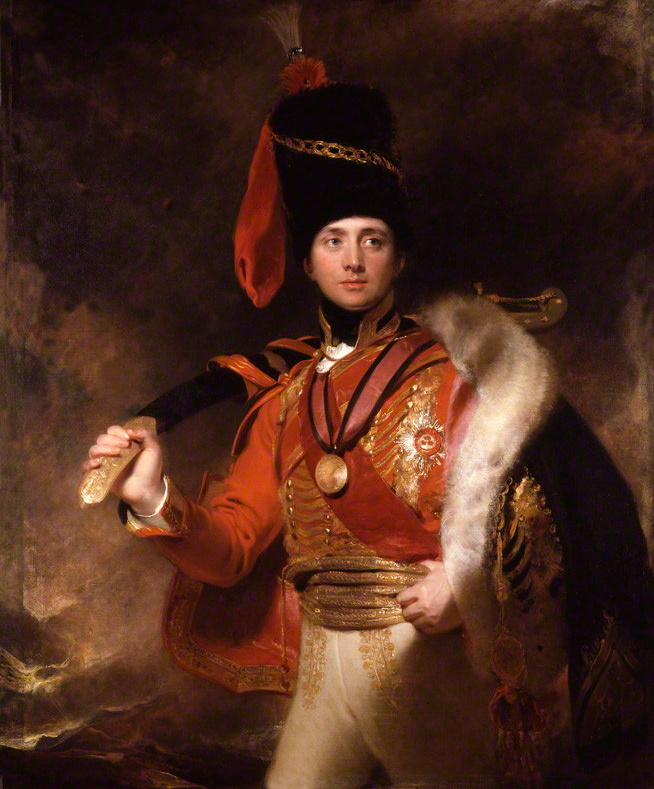
Portrait of Sir Charles Stewart (3rd Marquess of Londonderry), 1812

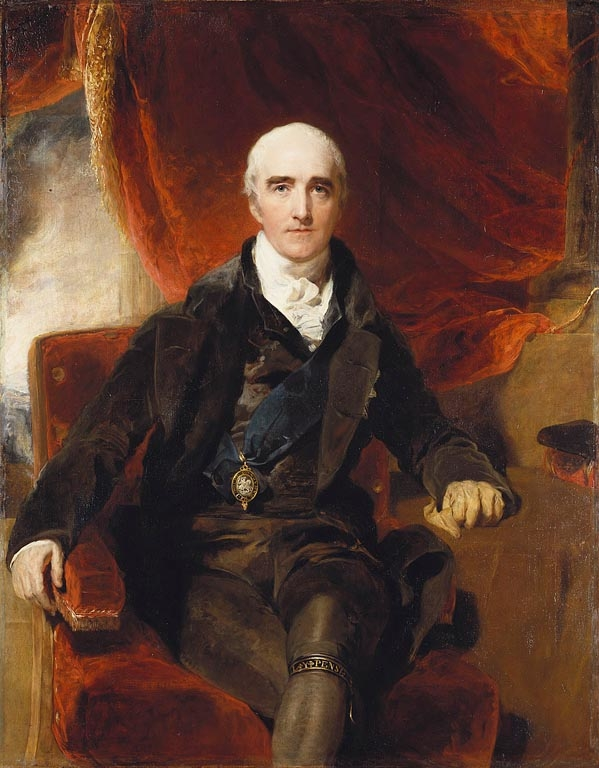
Portrait of the Marquess Wellesley, 1813

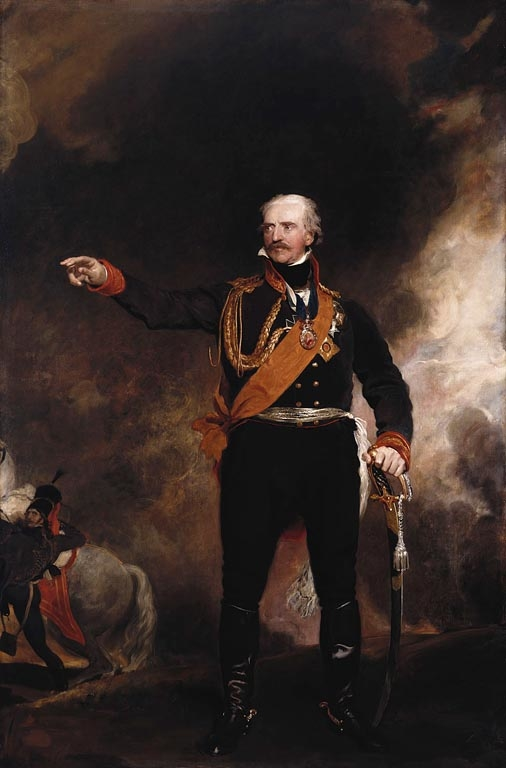
Portrait of Marshal Blücher, 1814

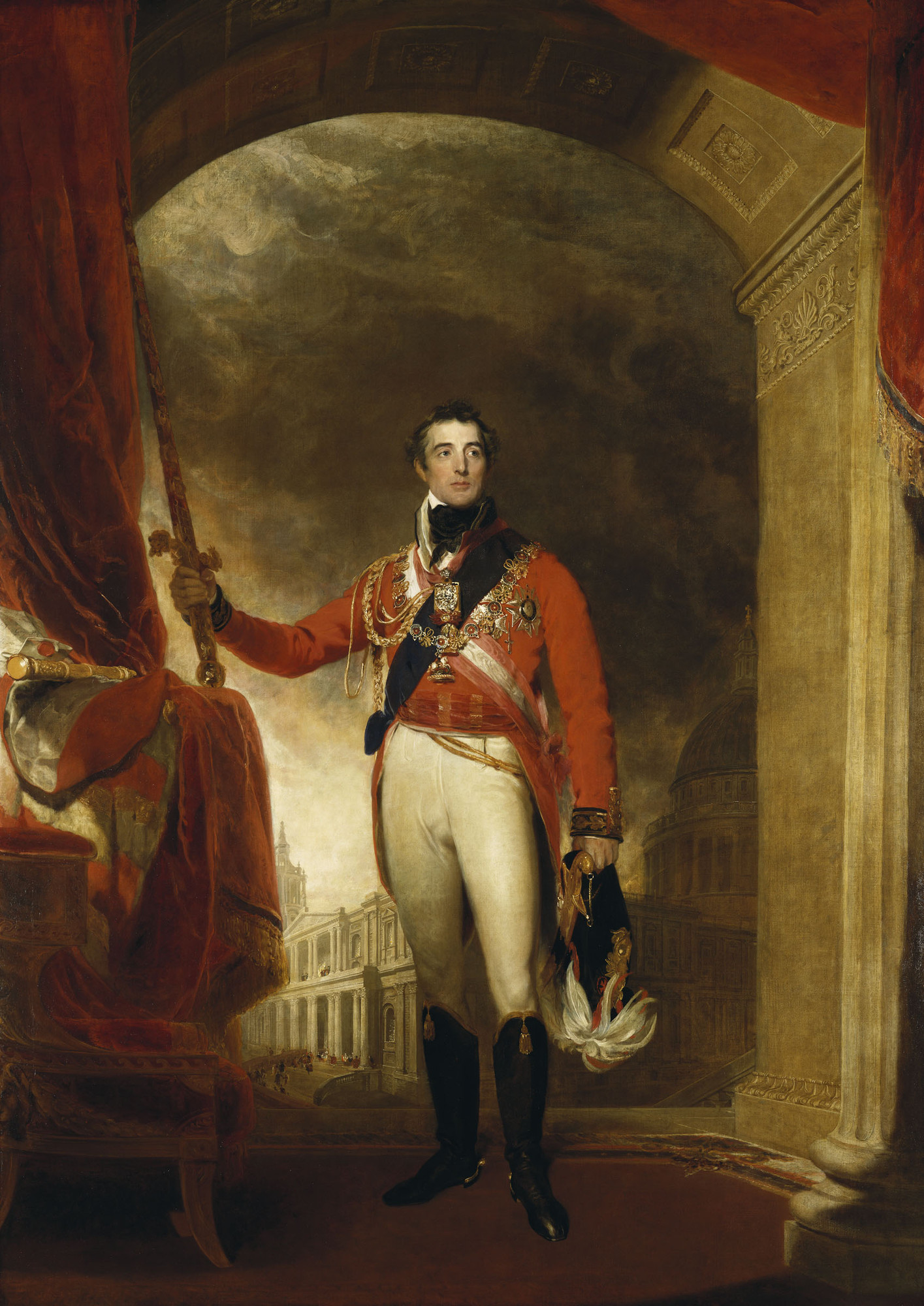
Portrait of the Duke of Wellington for the Waterloo Chamber 1814–1815

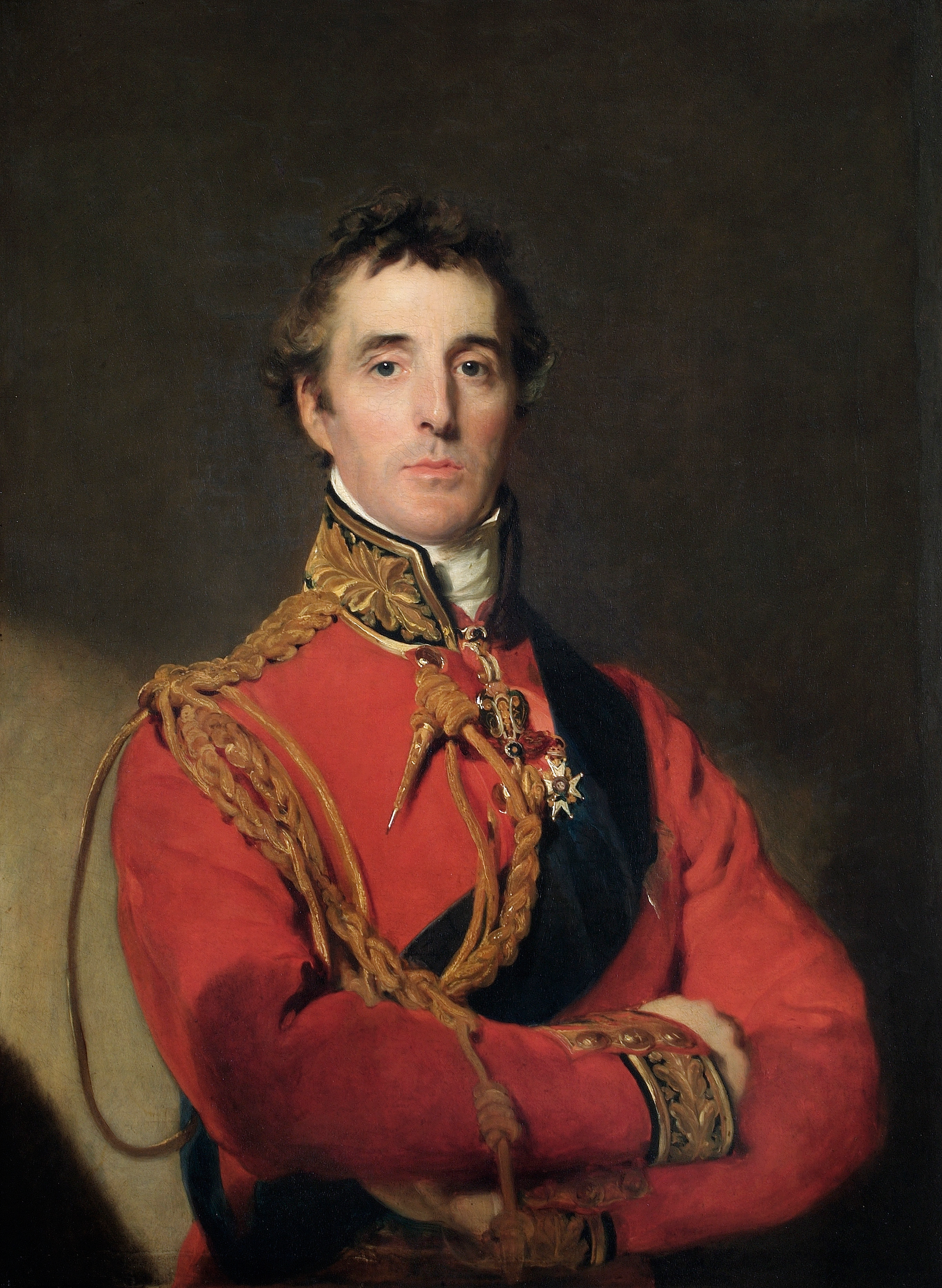
Portrait of the Duke of Wellington c.1815

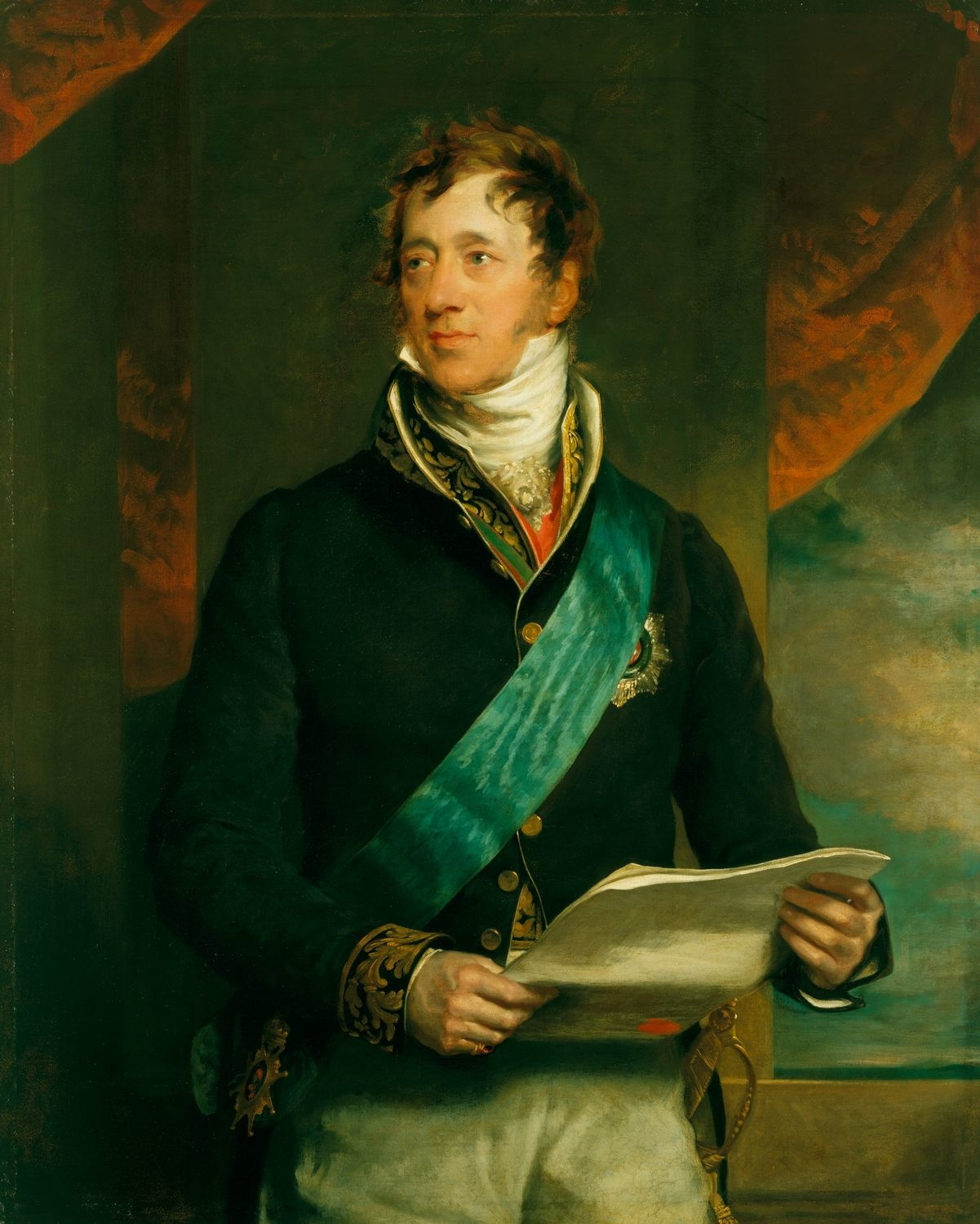
Portrait of Count Münster, 1815

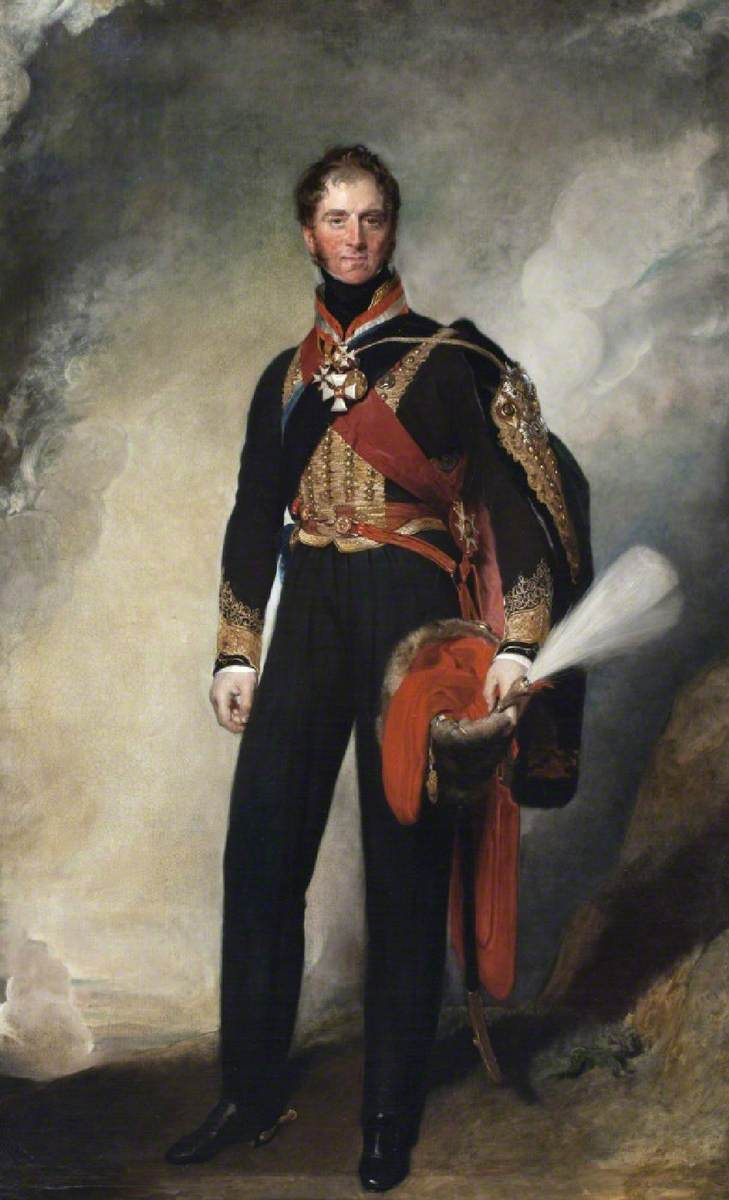
Portrait of Lord Uxbridge, c.1816

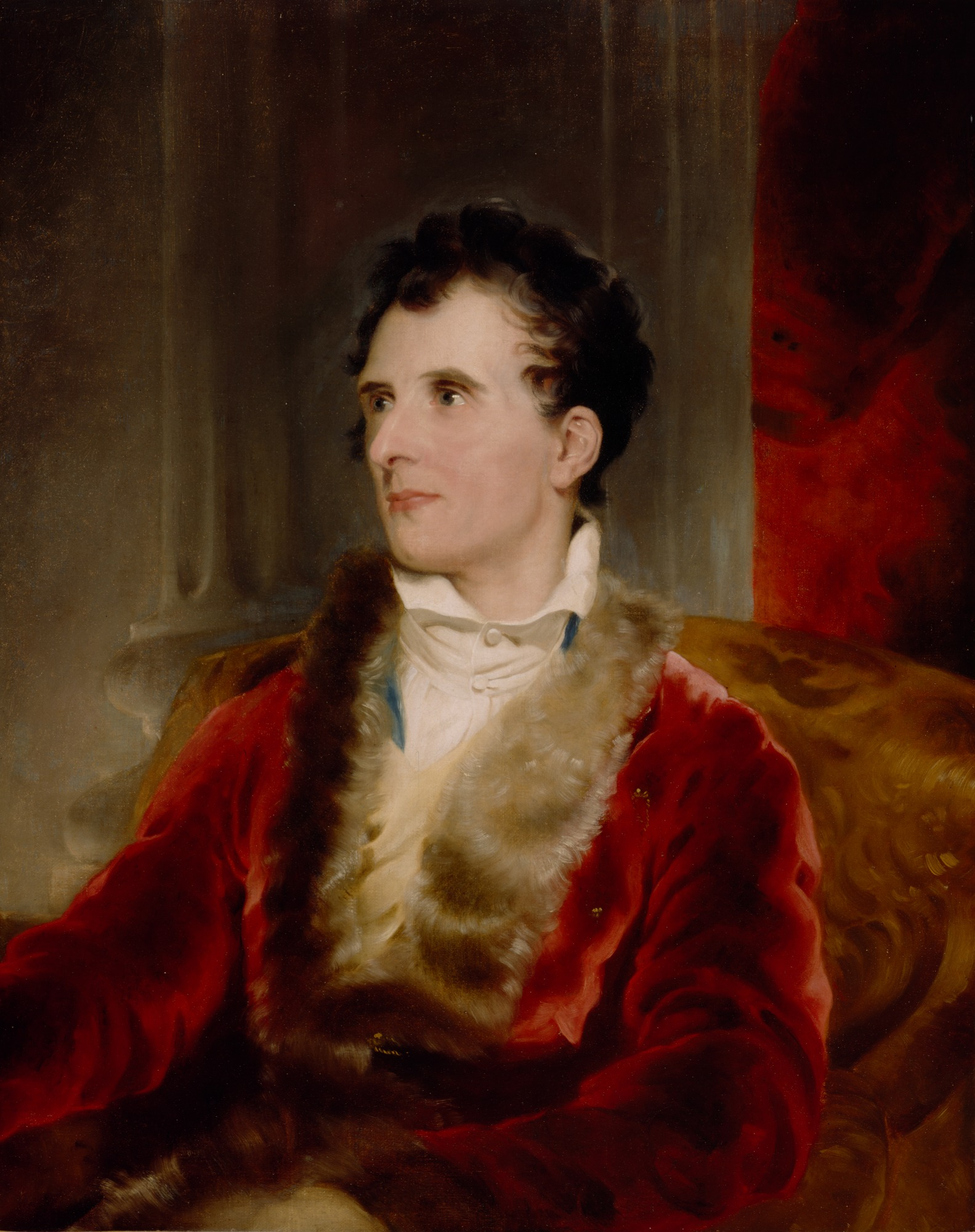
Antonio Canova, 1818

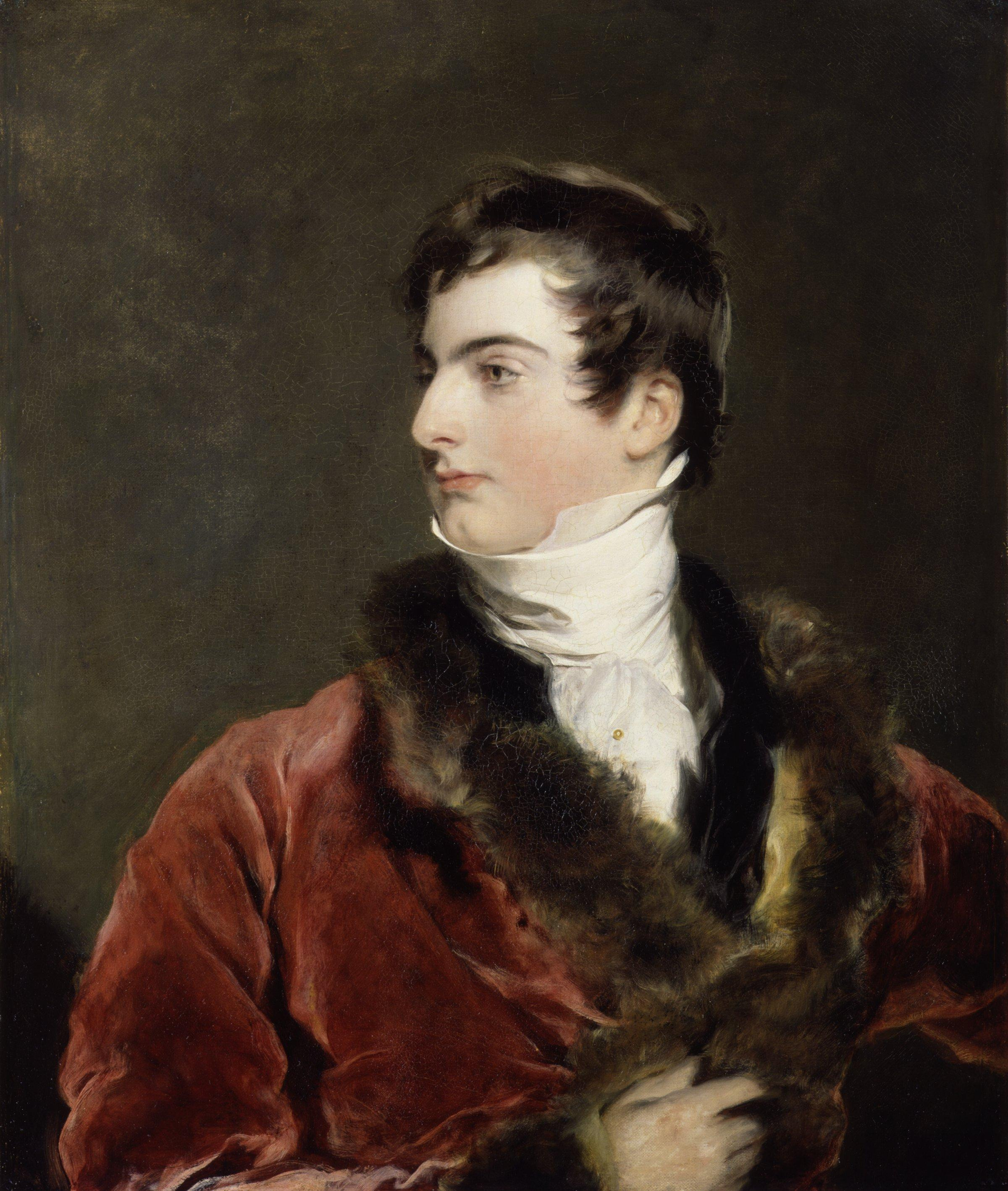
John Bloomfield, 2nd Baron Bloomfield, 1819

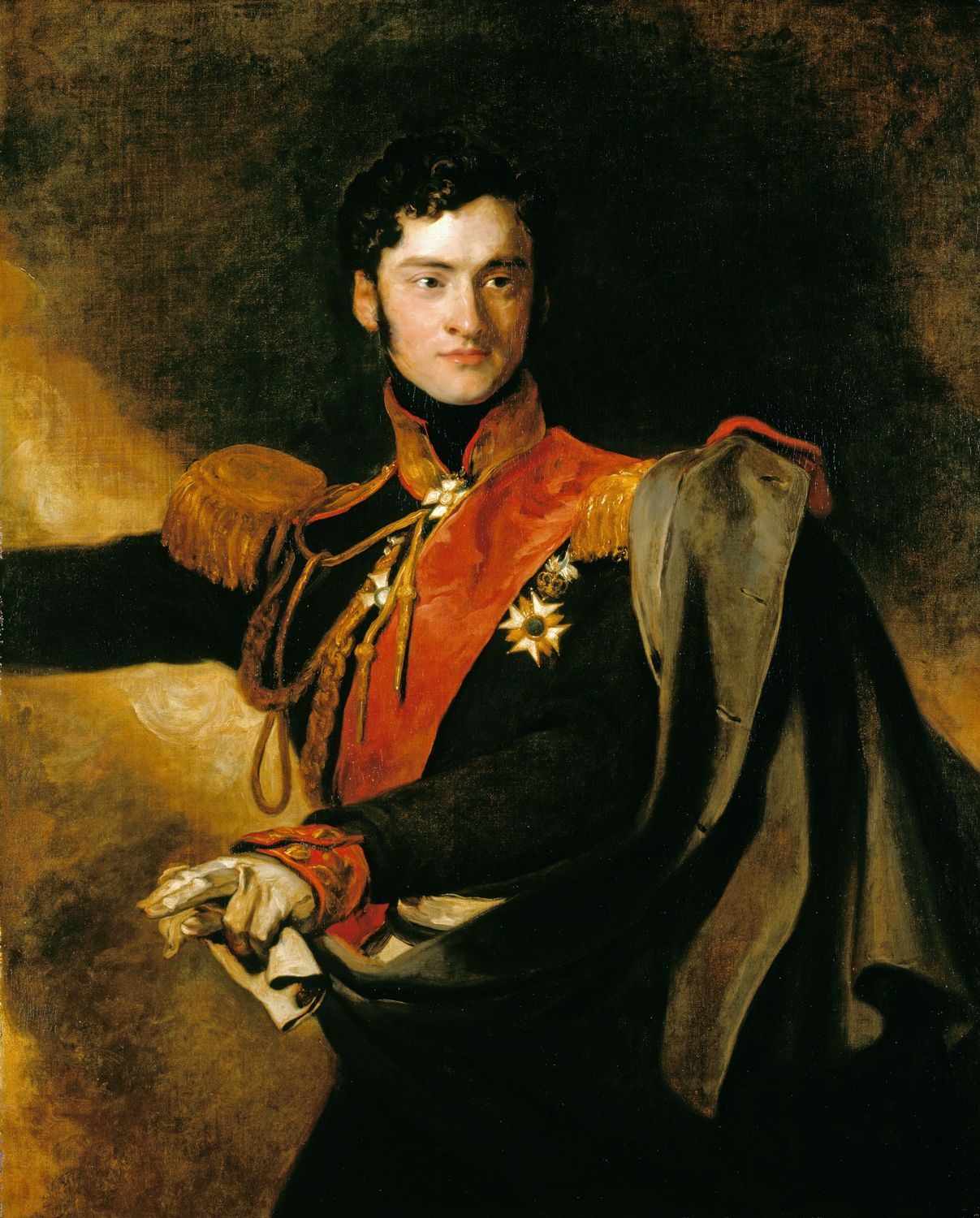
Alexander Chernyshyov, 1818

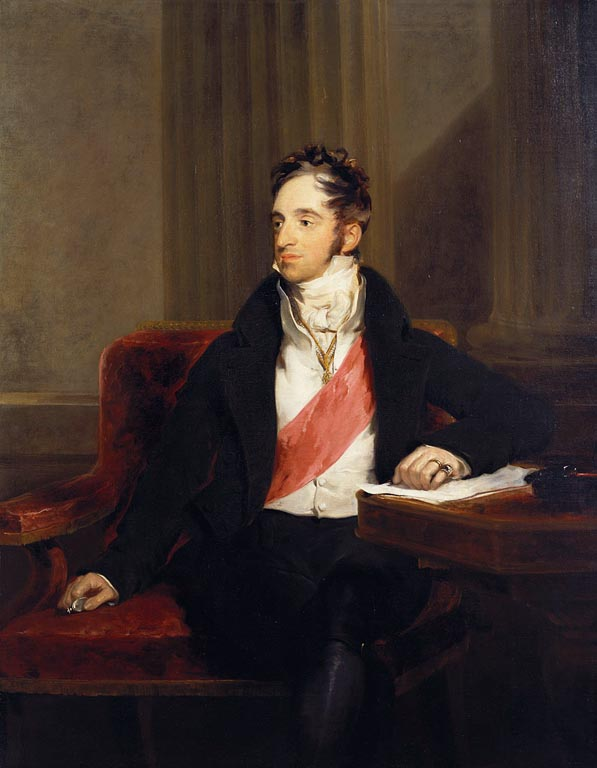
Portrait of Count Nesselrode, 1818

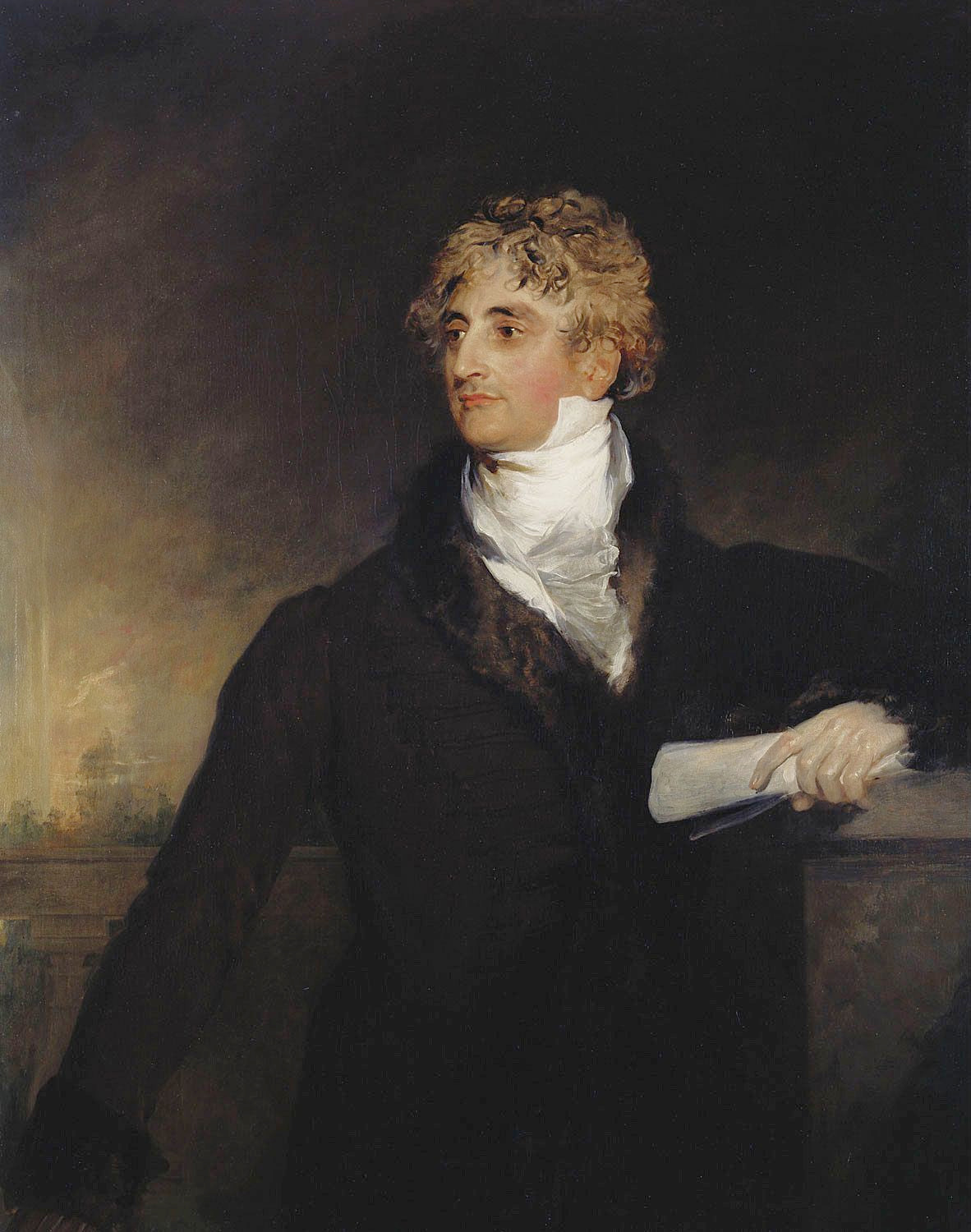
Portrait of the Duke of Richelieu, 1818

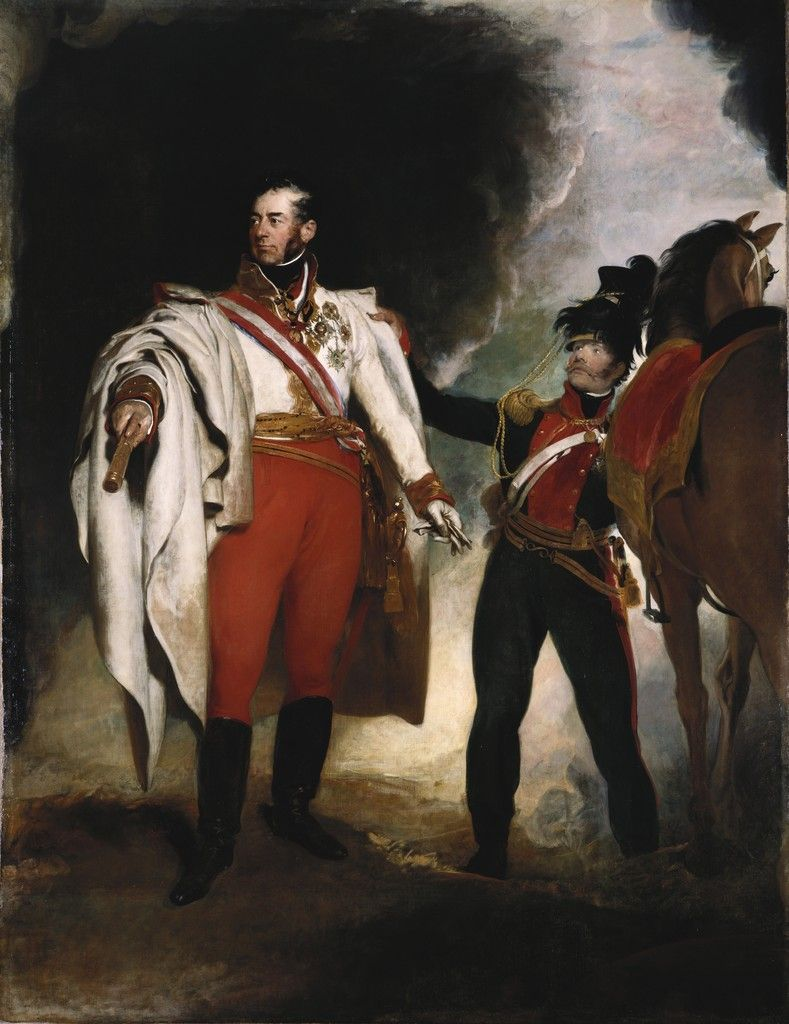
Portrait of Prince Schwarzenberg, 1819

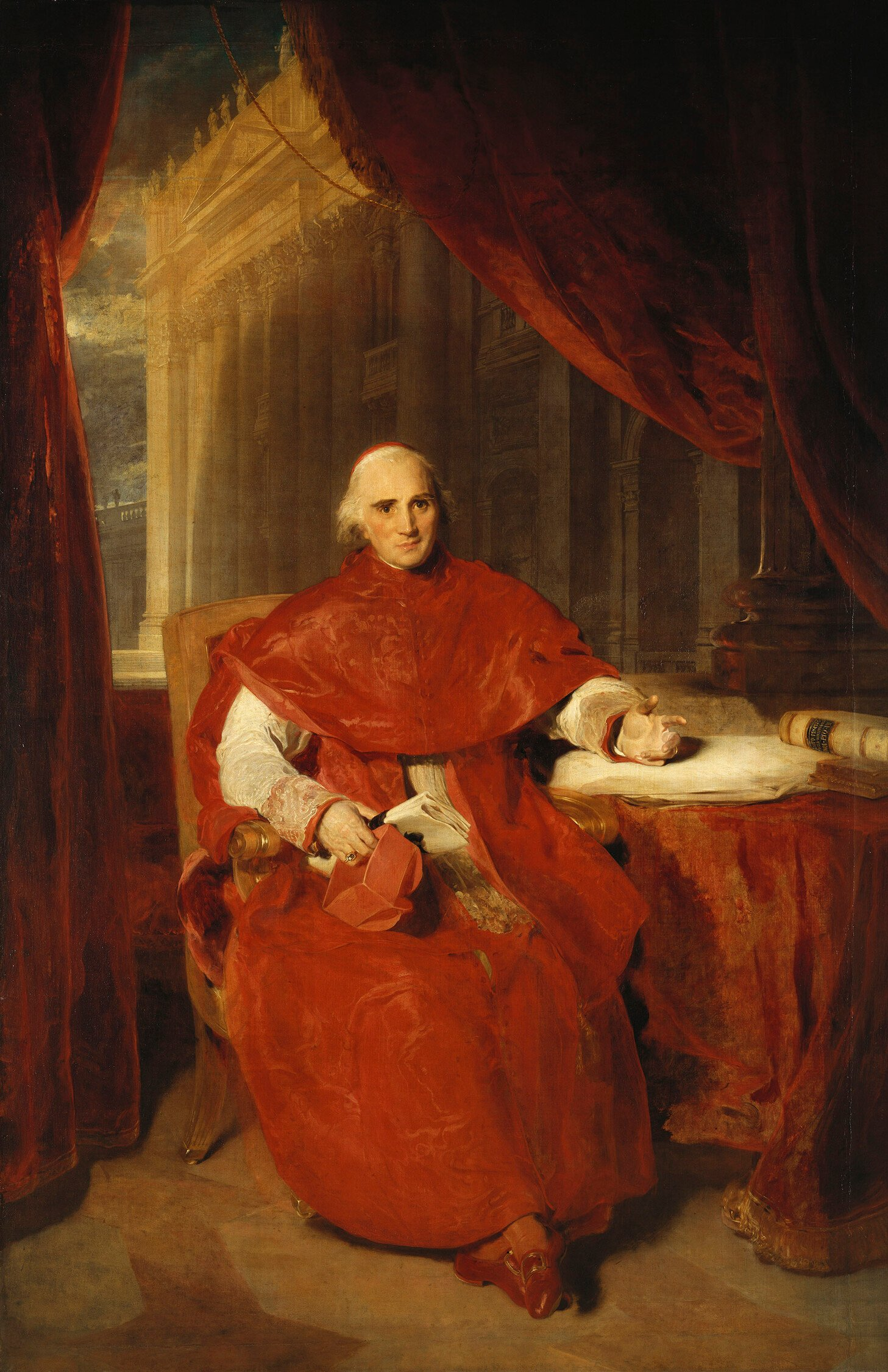
Cardinal Consalvi, 1819

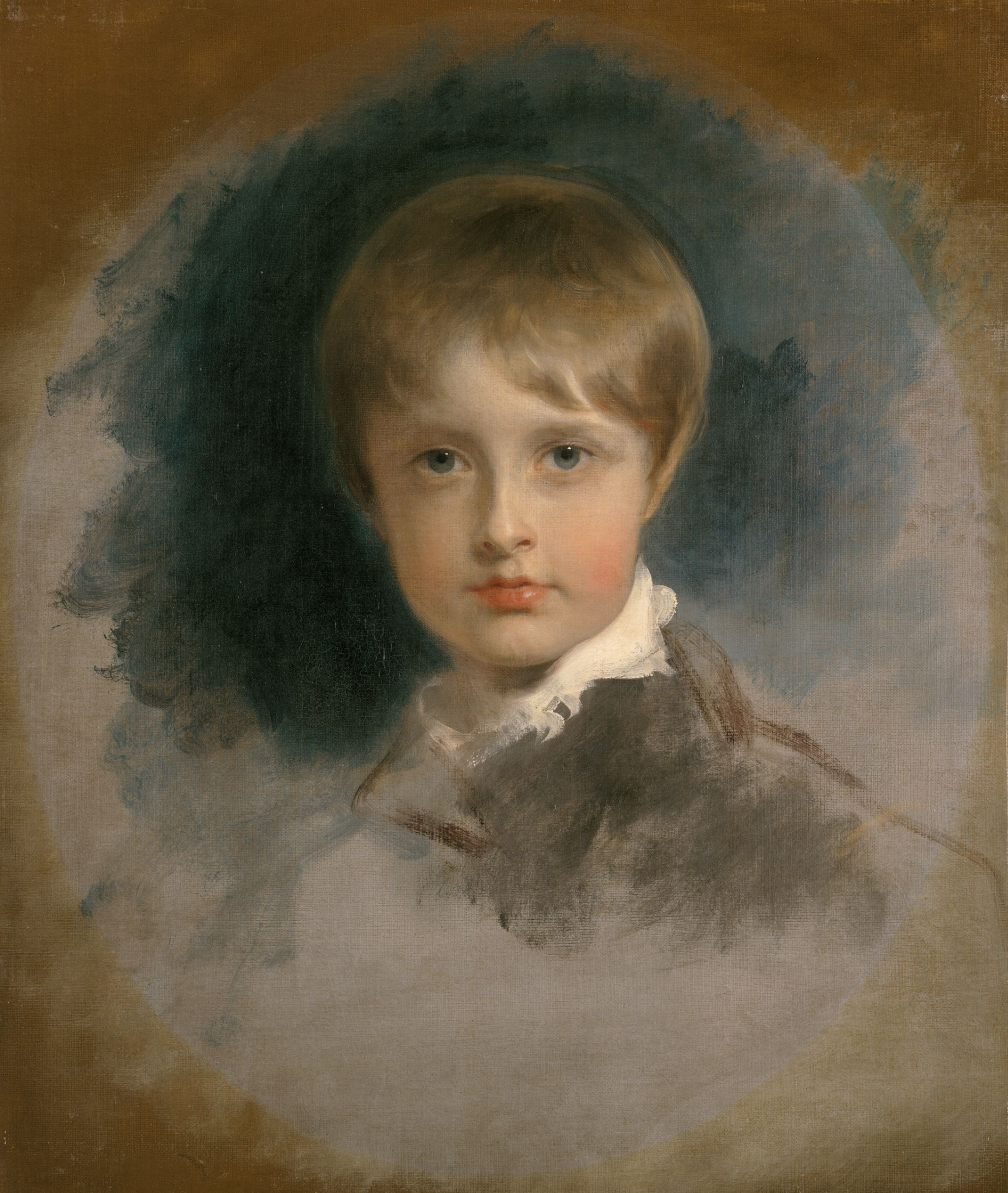
Portrait of Napoleon II, c. 1819

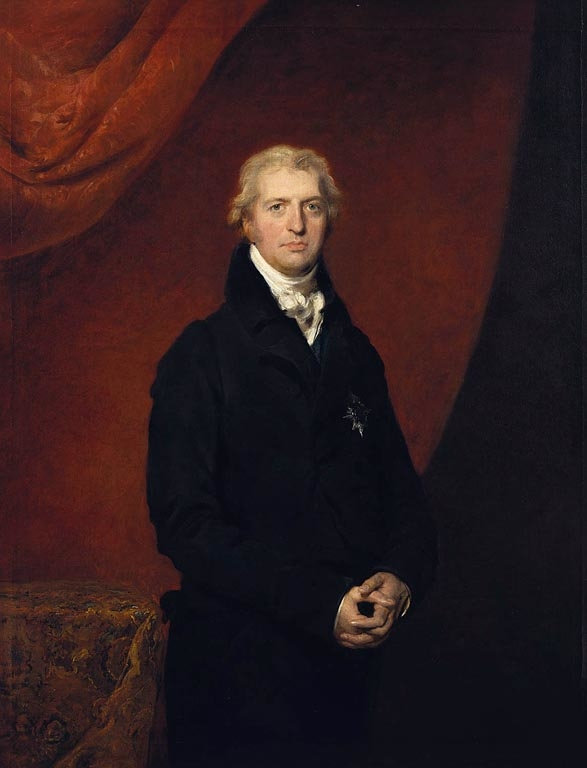
Portrait of Lord Liverpool, 1820

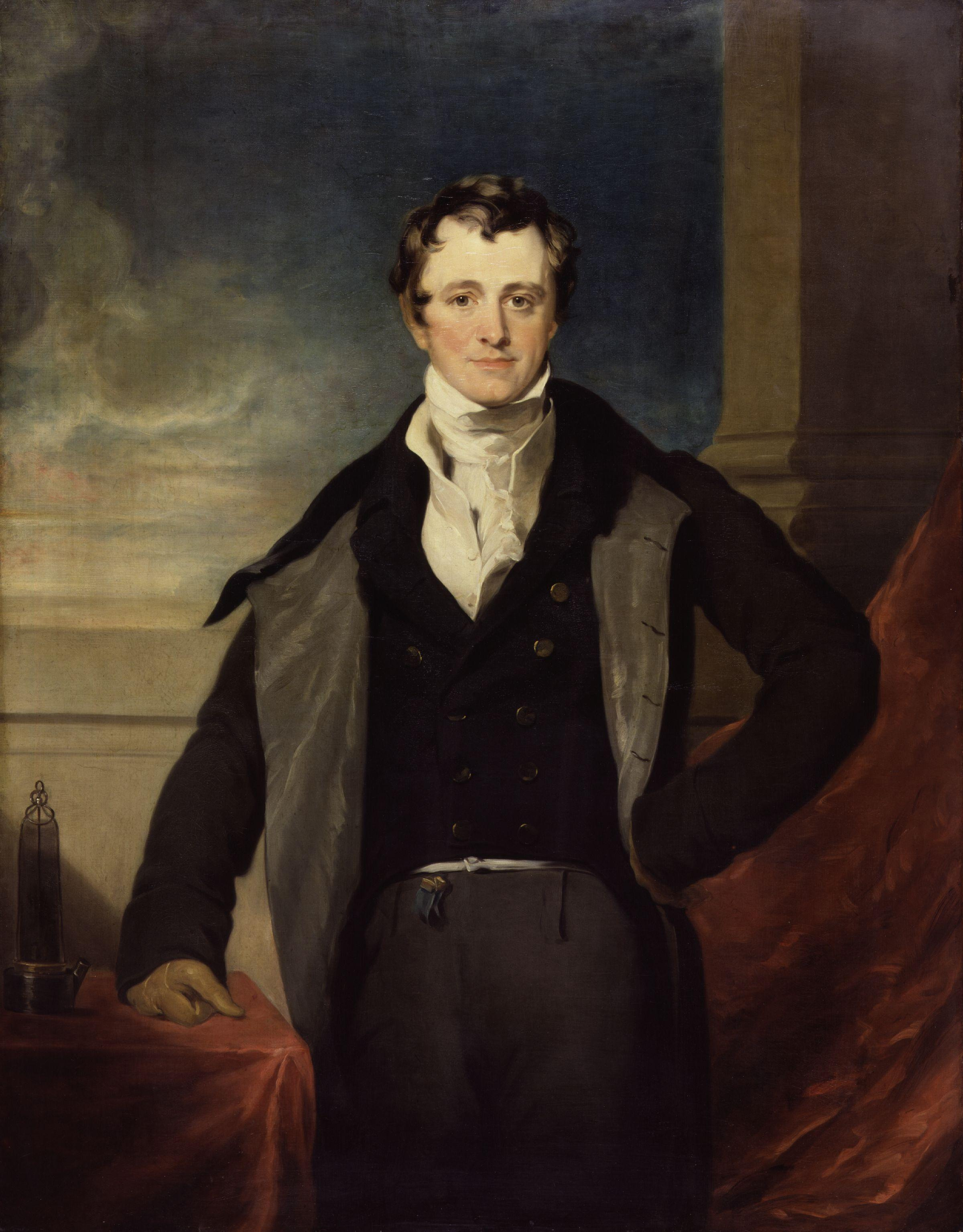
Portrait of Sir Humphry Davy, 1821

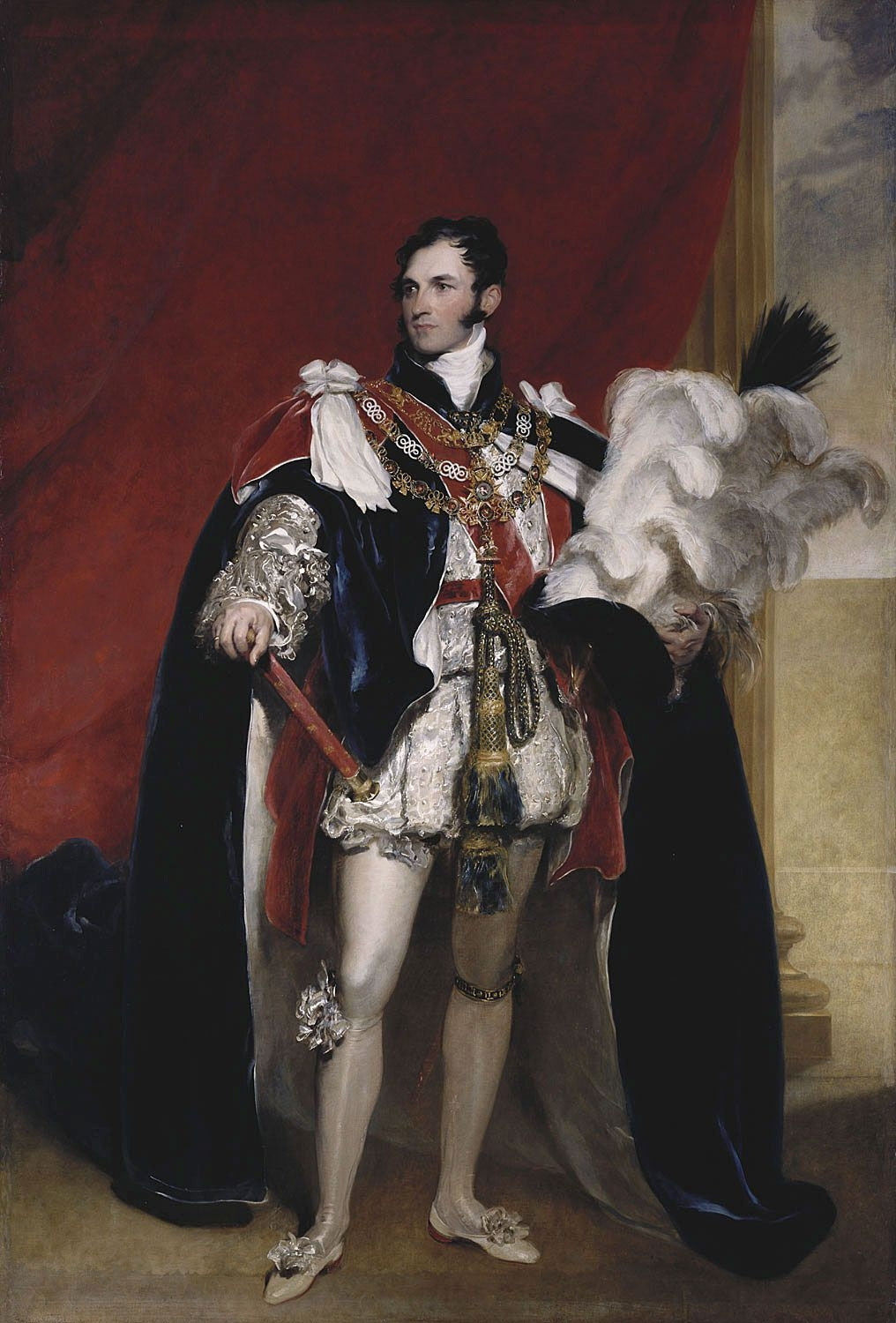
Portrait of Prince Leopold, 1821

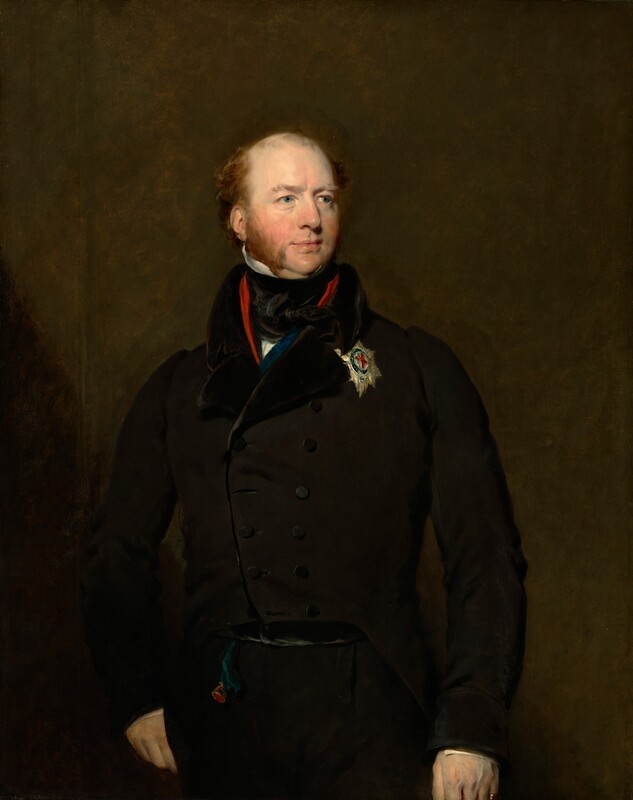
Portrait of the Marquess of Hertford, 1823

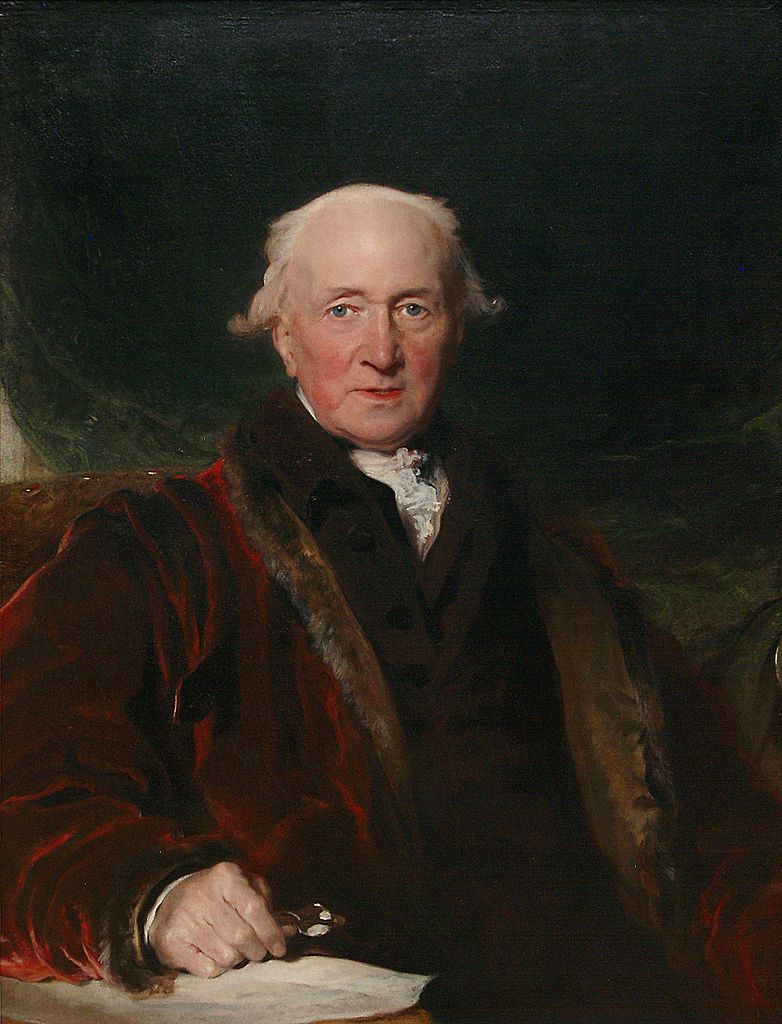
John Julius Angerstein, 1824

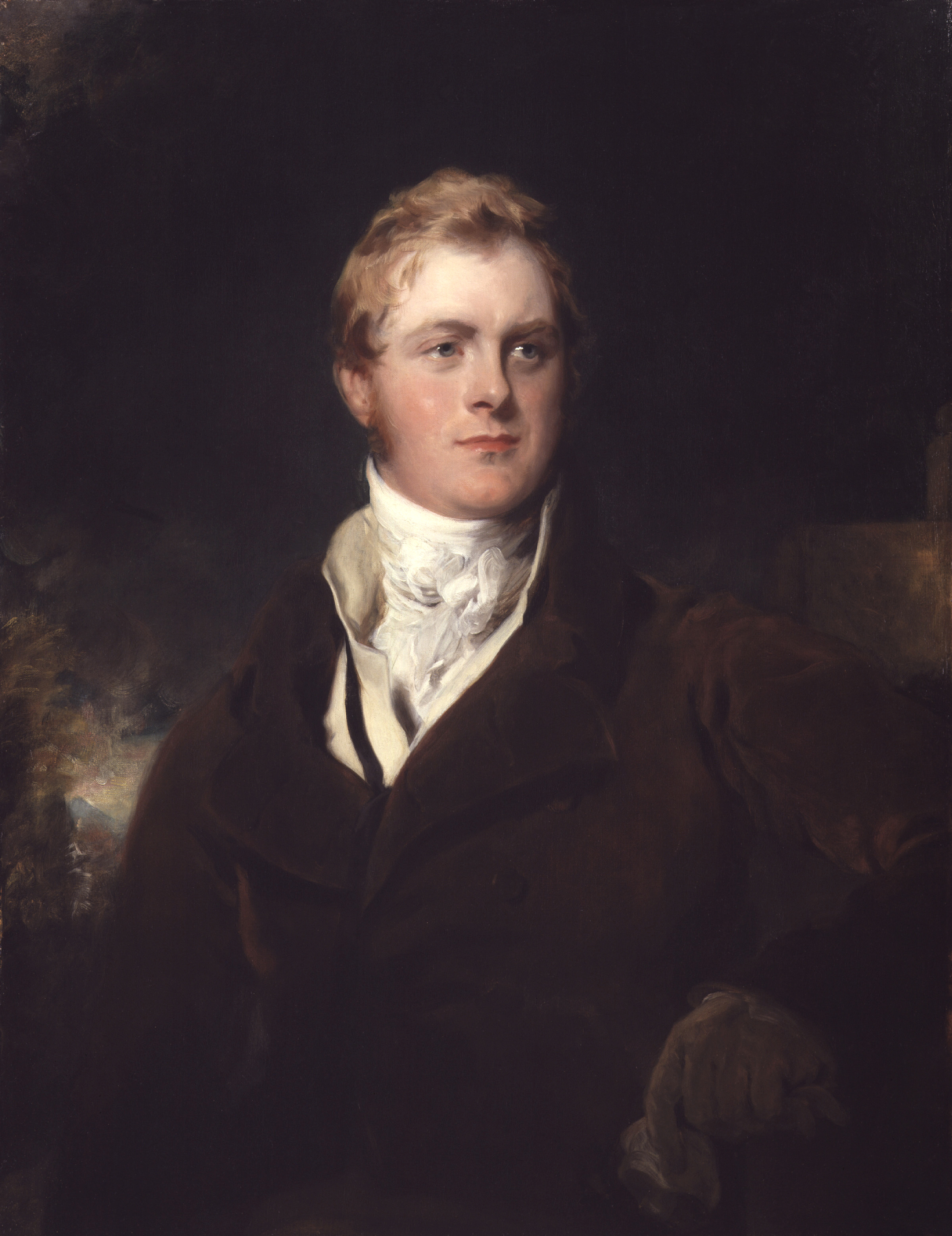
Portrait of Frederick Robinson, 1824

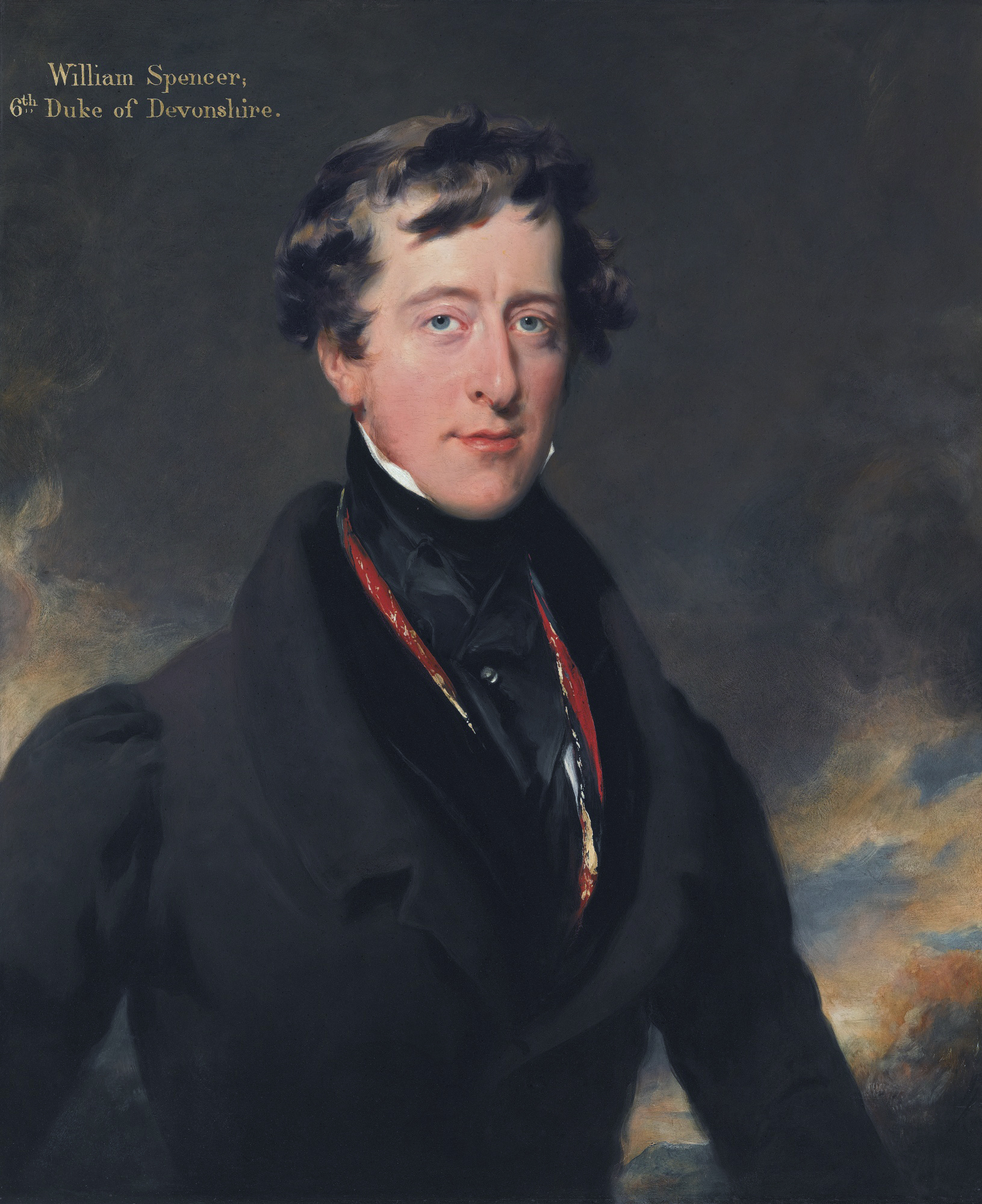
Portrait of the Duke of Devonshire, 1824

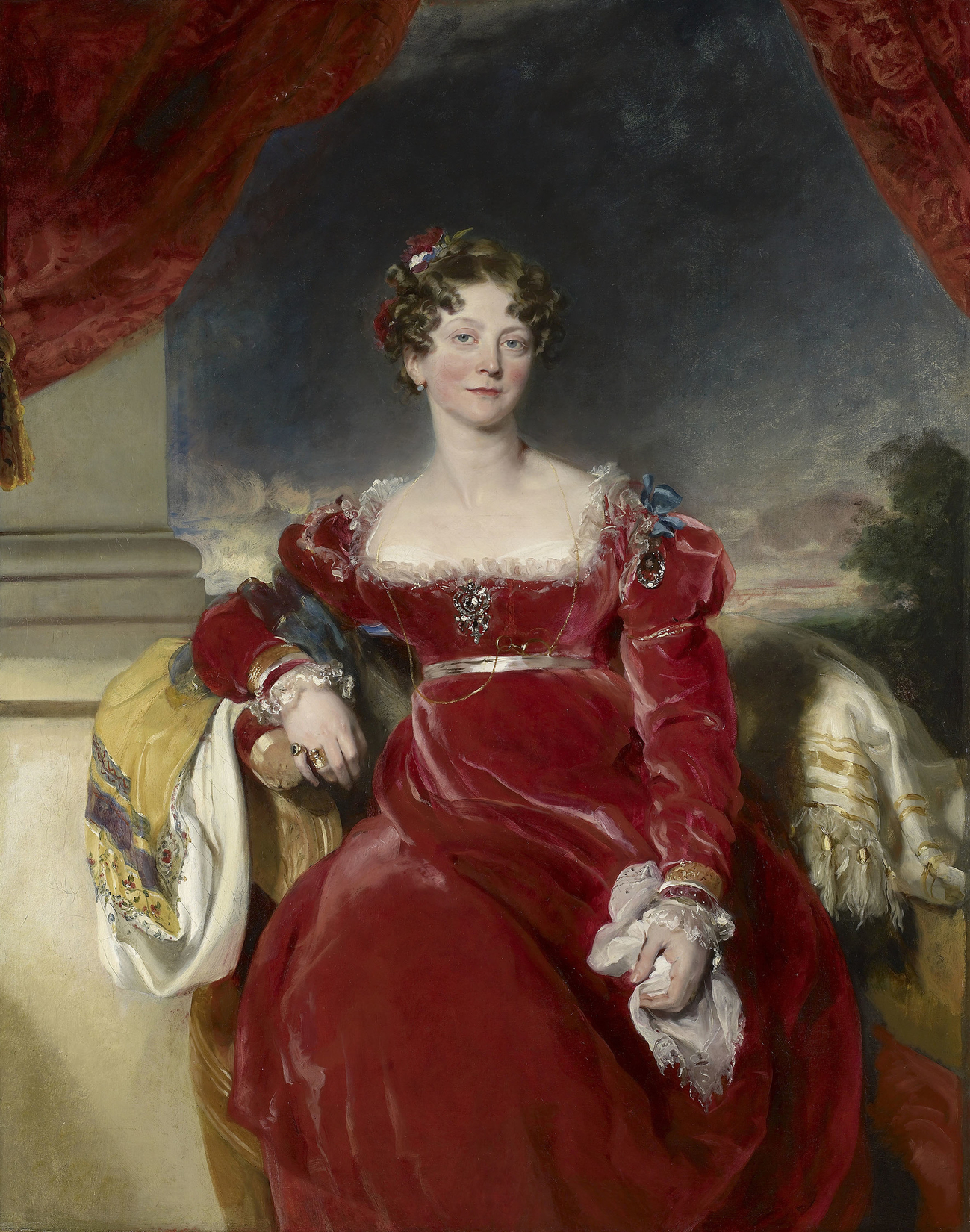
Portrait of Princess Sophia, 1824

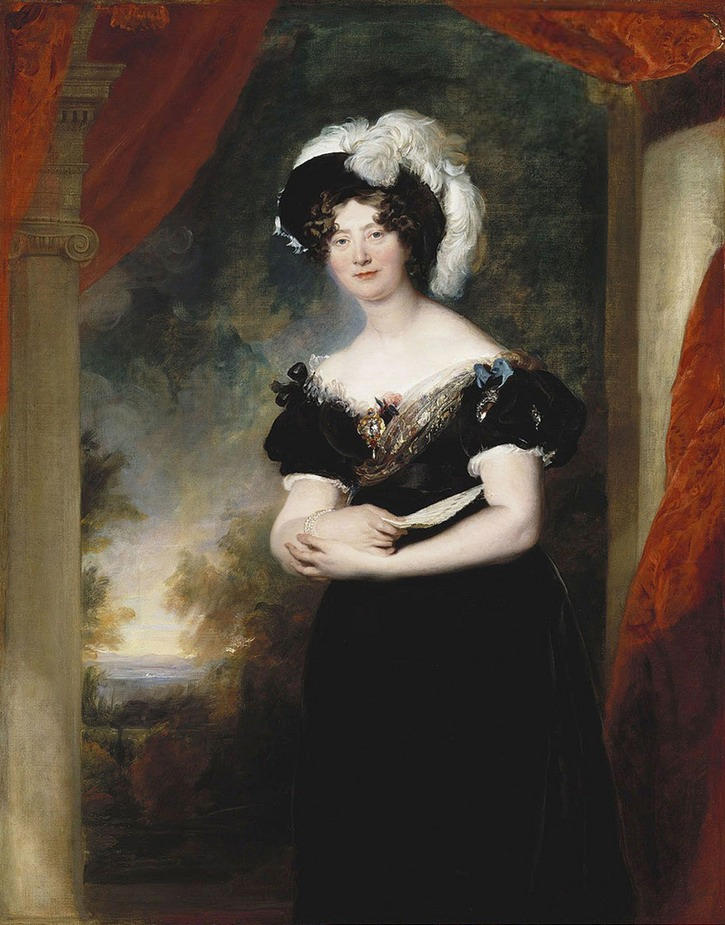
Princess Mary, 1824

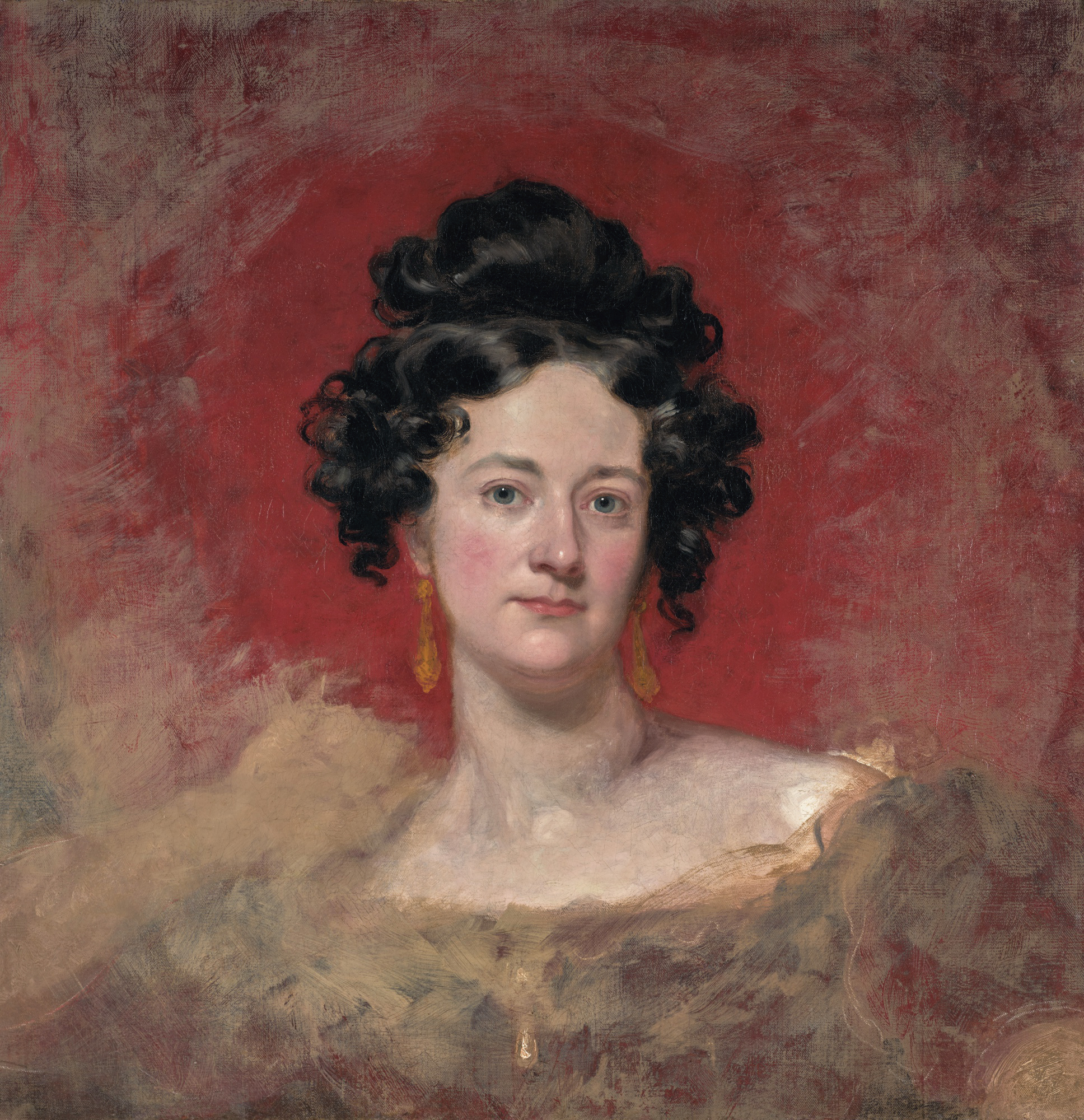
Wilhelmina Bowlby (1798–1834), circa 1825

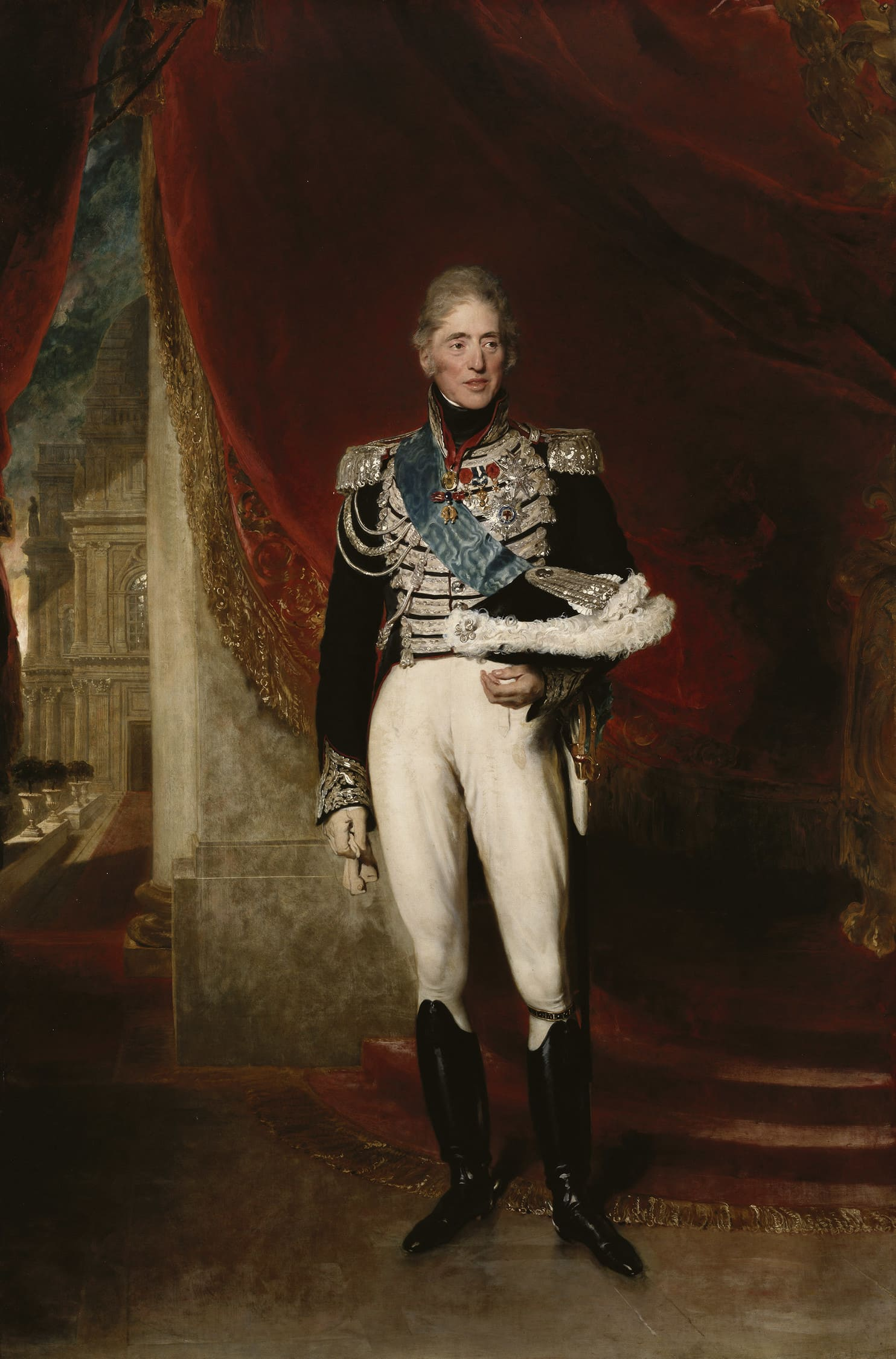
Portrait of Charles X of France, 1825

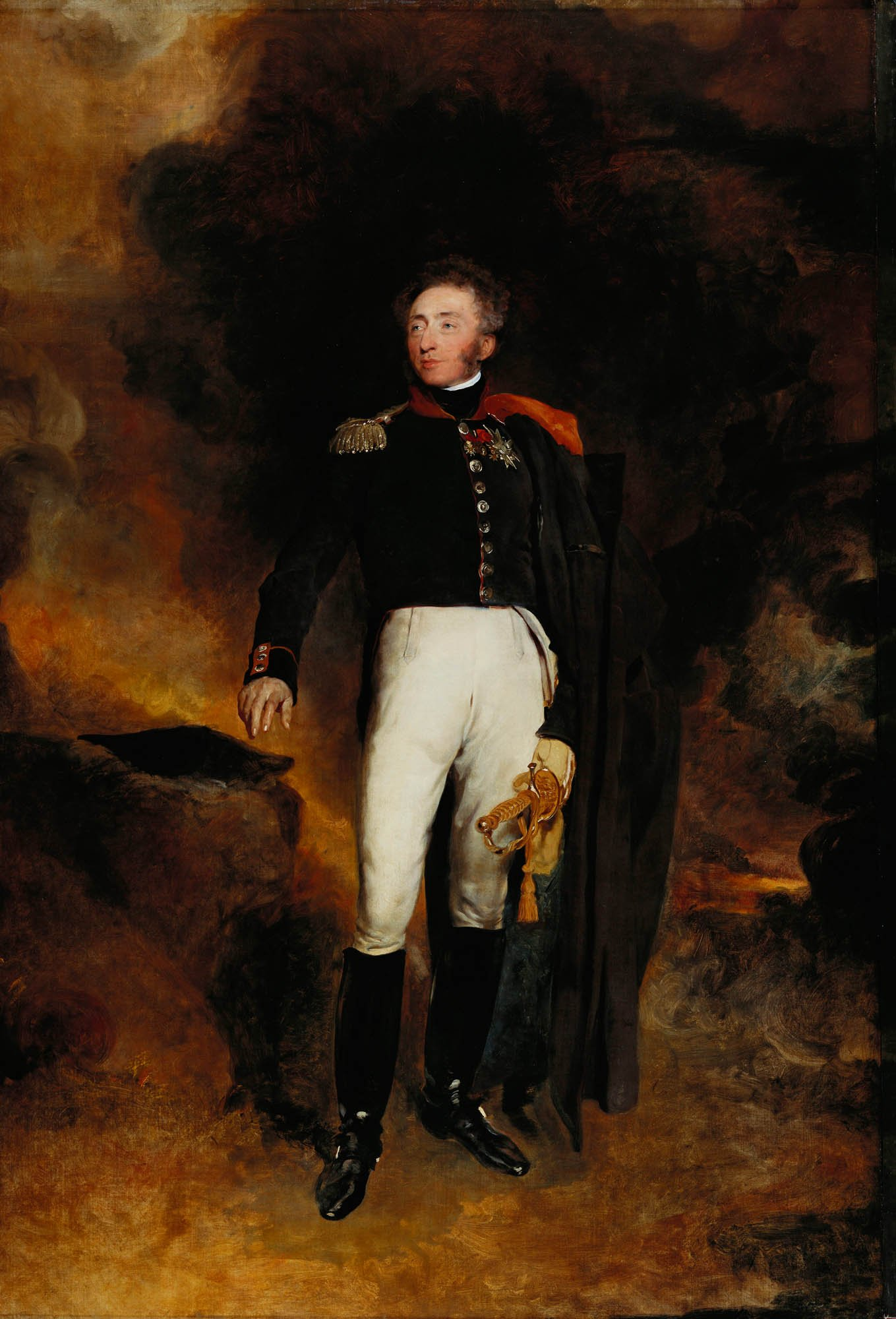
Portrait of the Duke of Angoulême, 1825

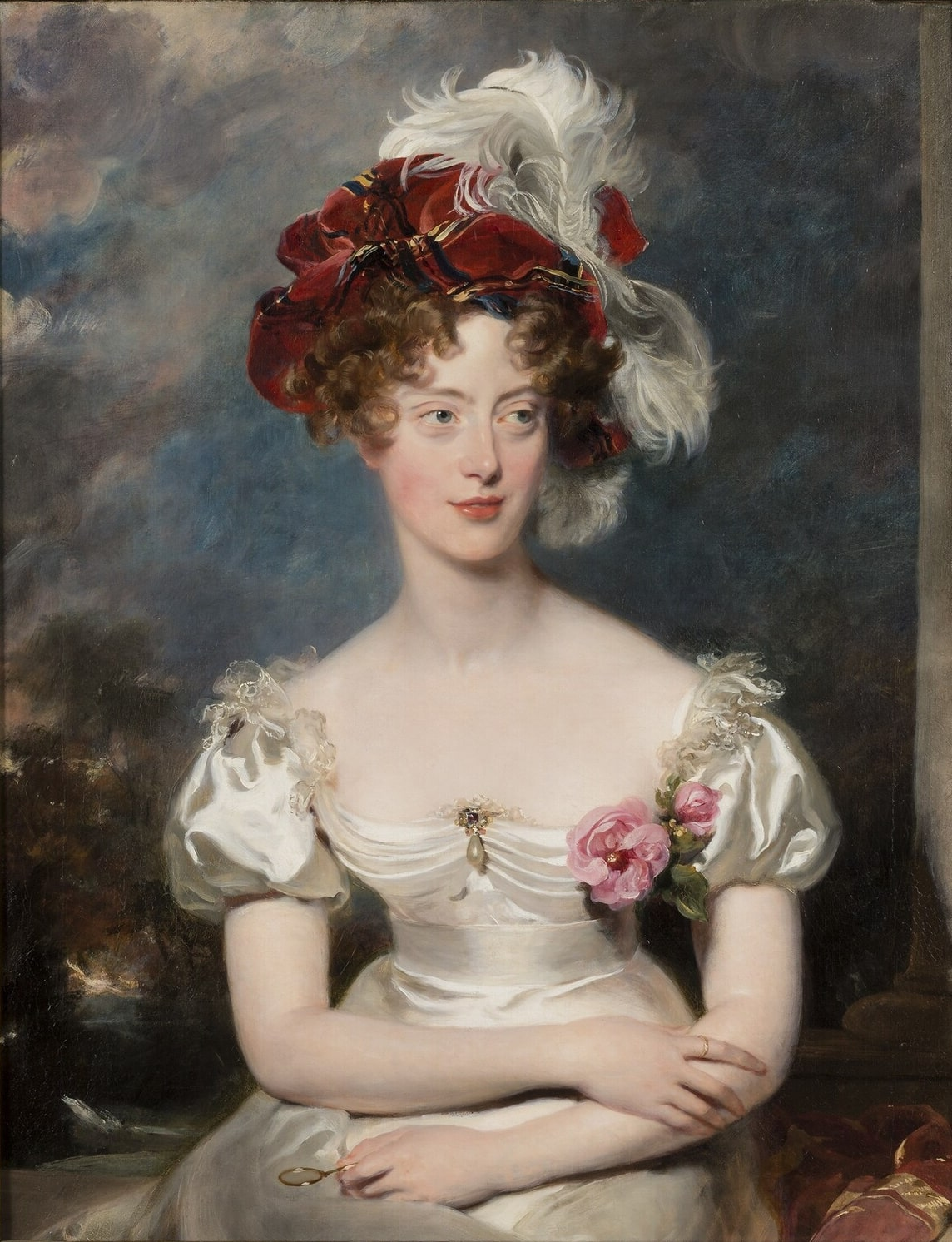
Portrait of the Duchess of Berry, 1825

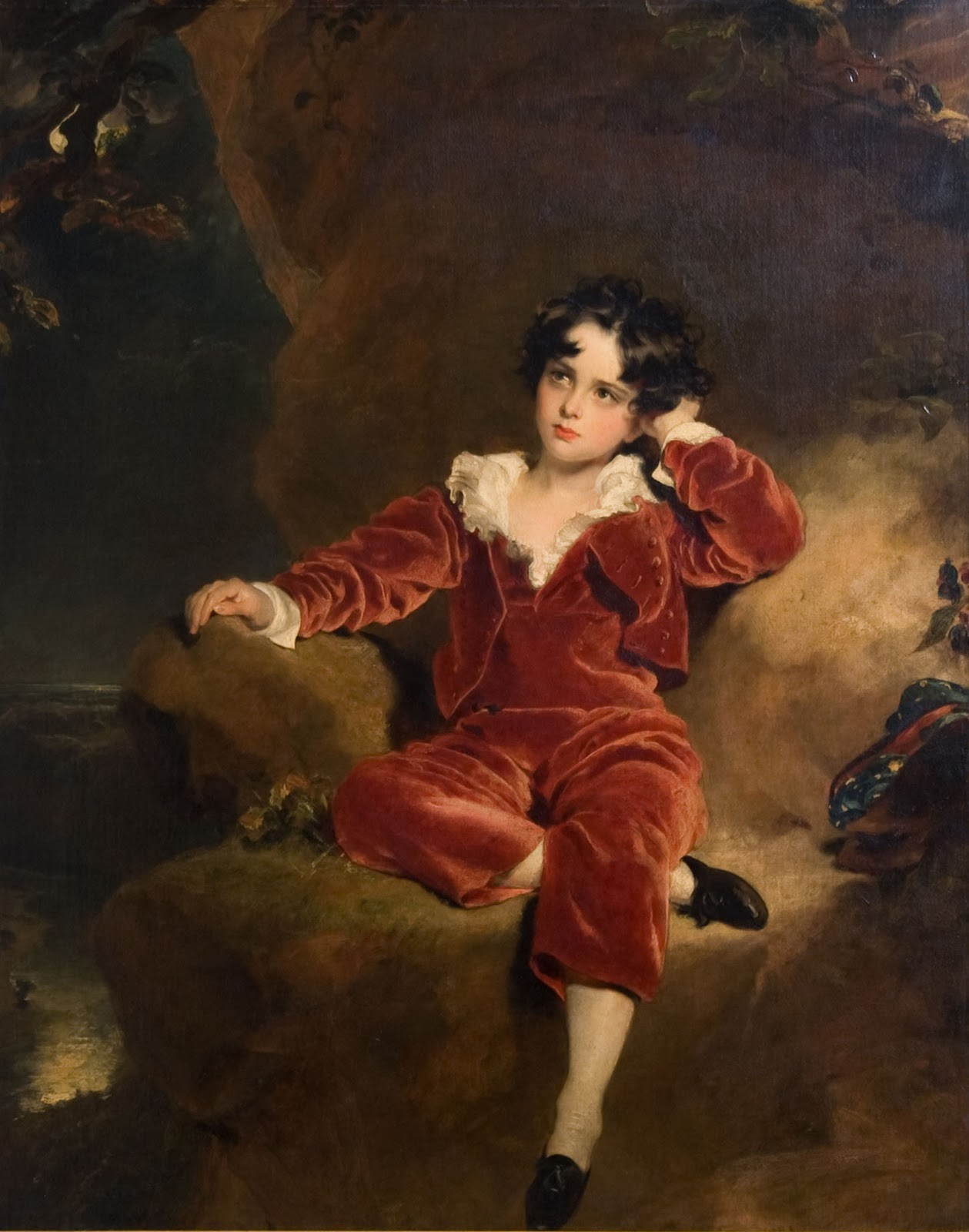
The Red Boy or Master Lambton 1825

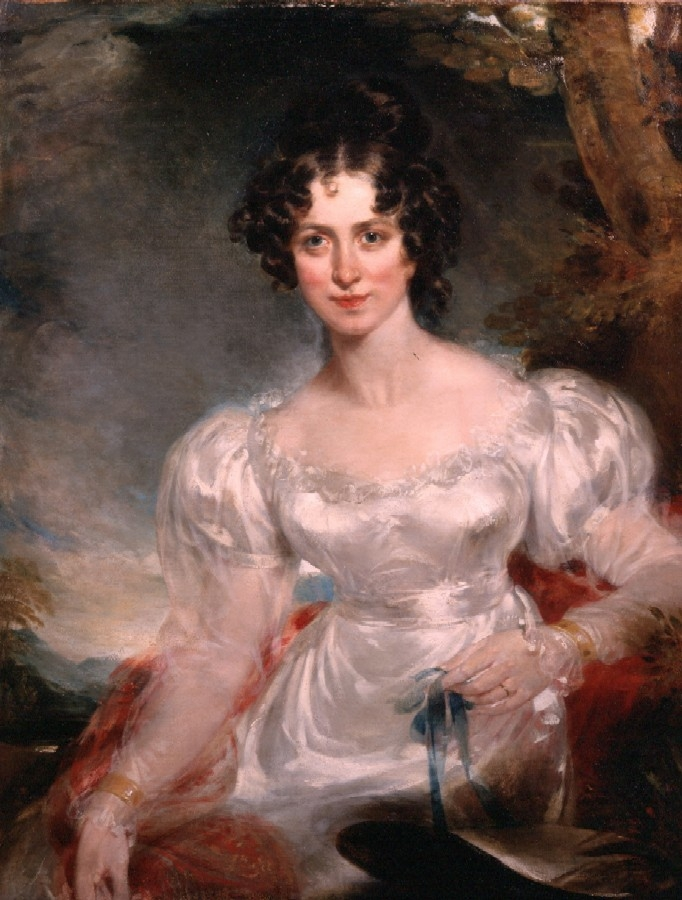
Anne, Lady Bentinck, 1825

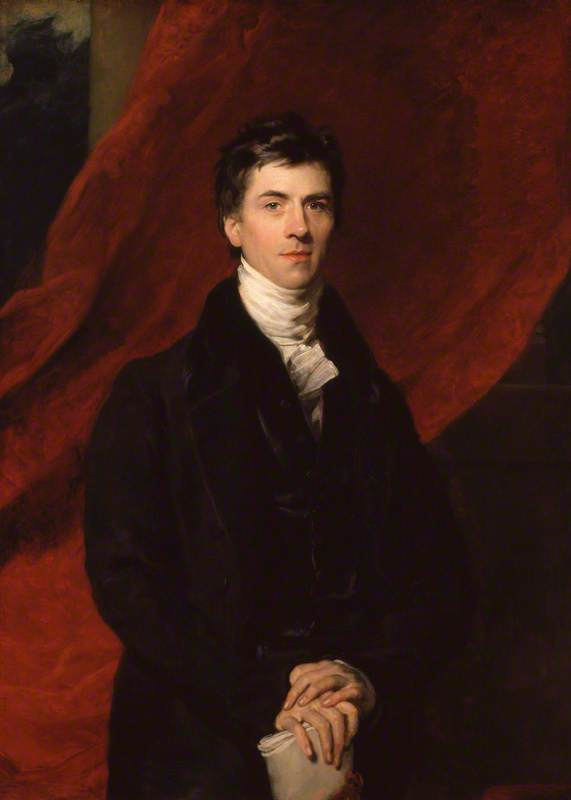
Portrait of Henry Brougham, 1825

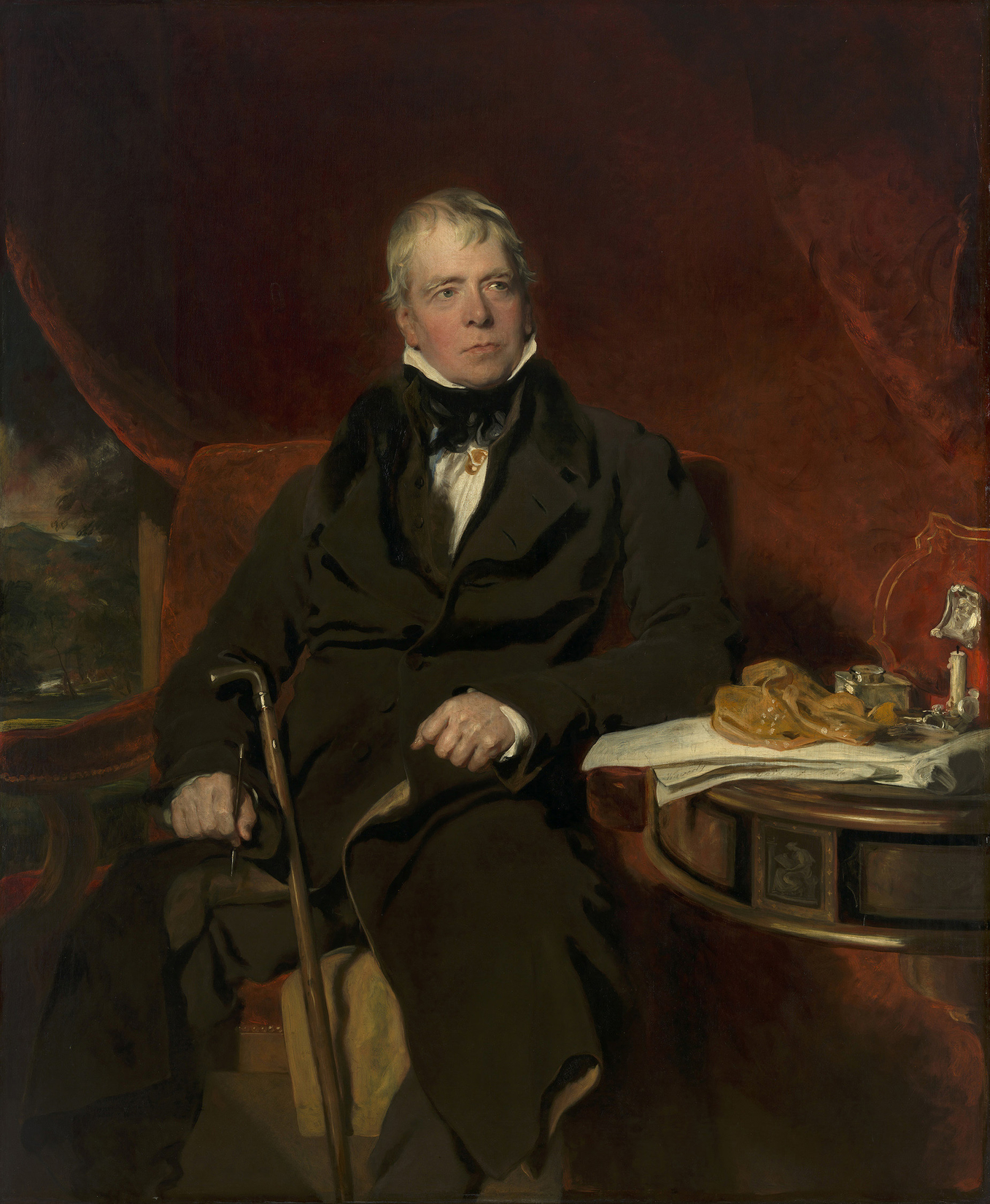
Portrait of Sir Walter Scott, c.1826

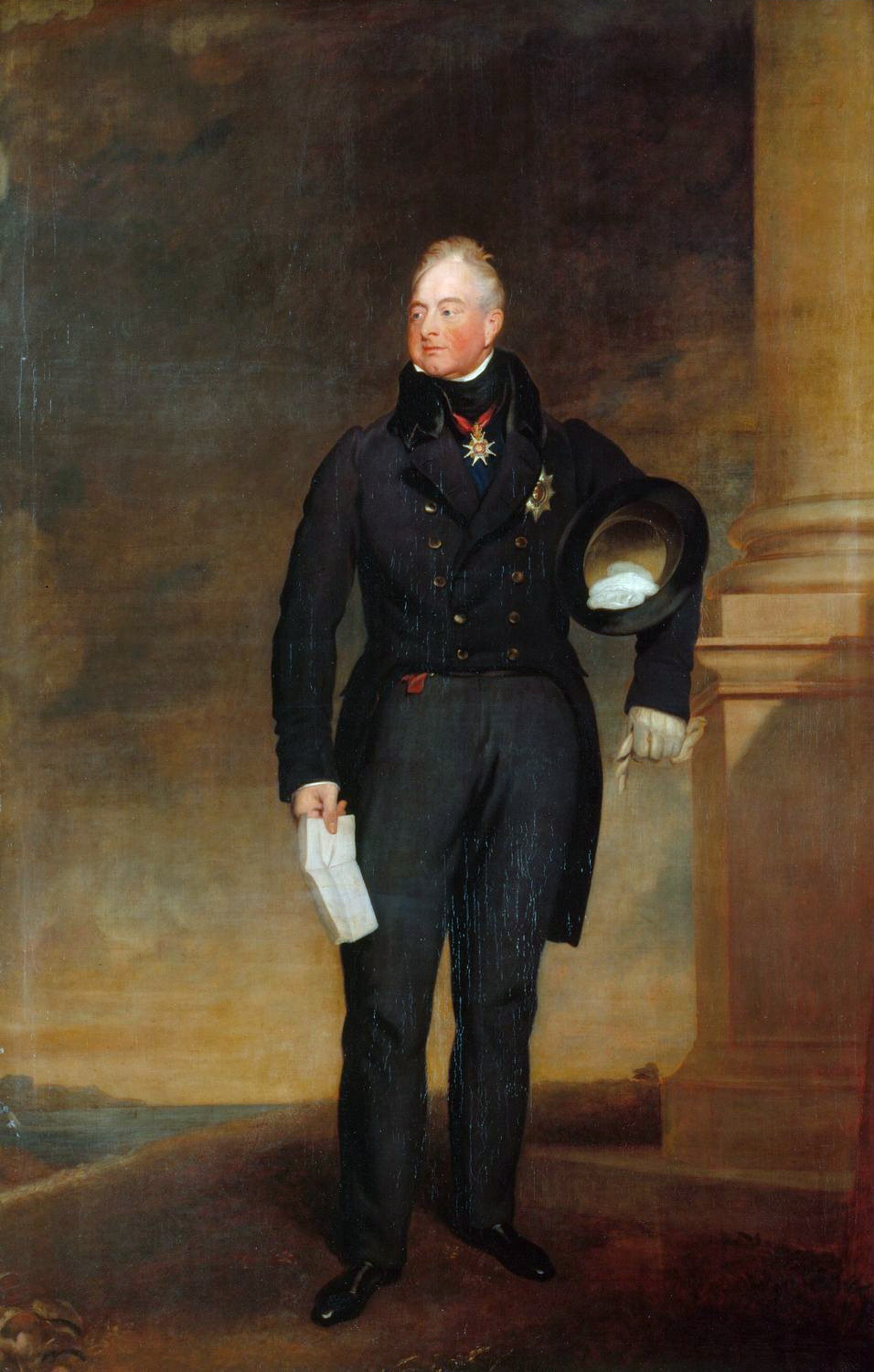
King William IV, then Duke of Clarence, 1827

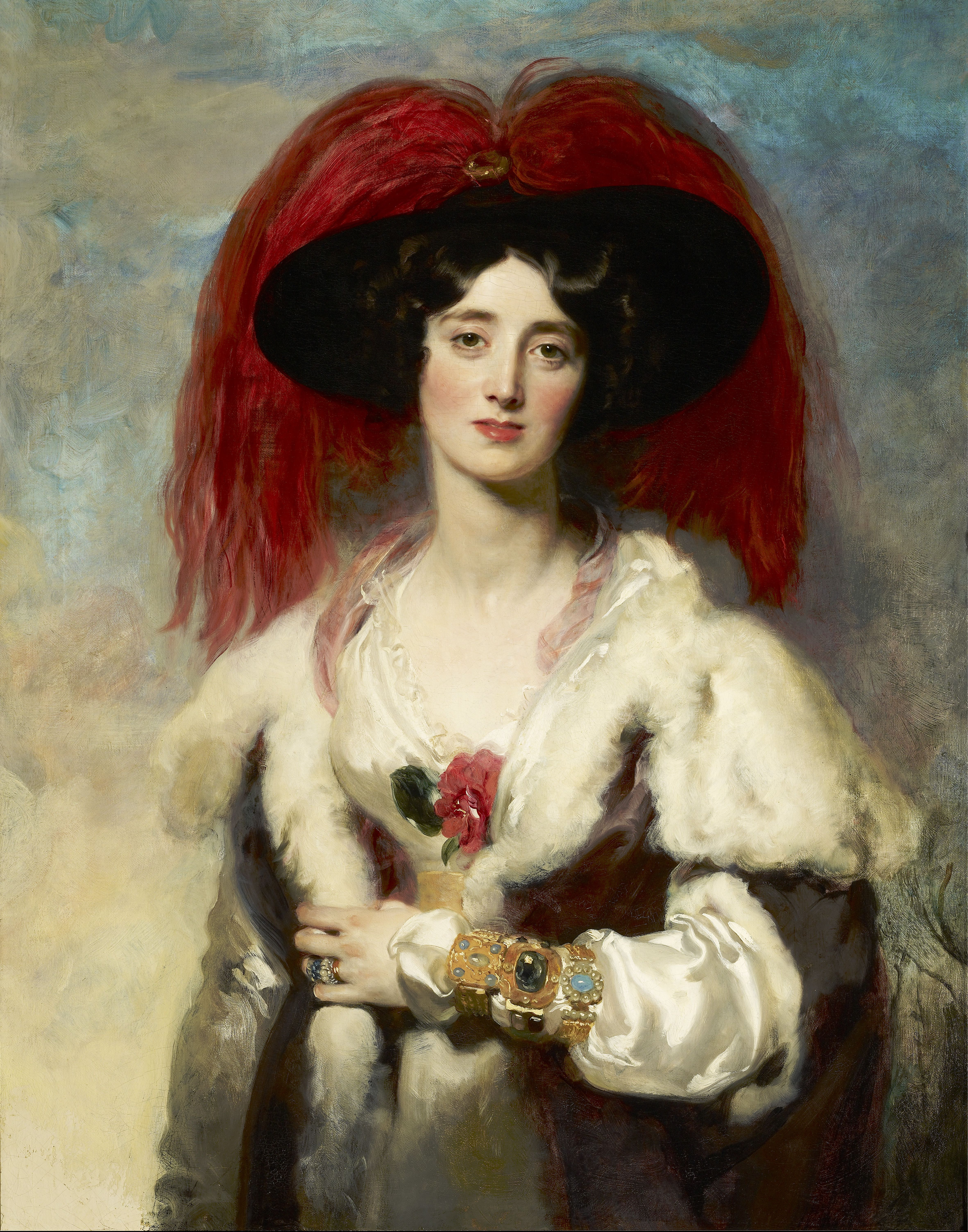
Portrait of Julia, Lady Peel, 1827

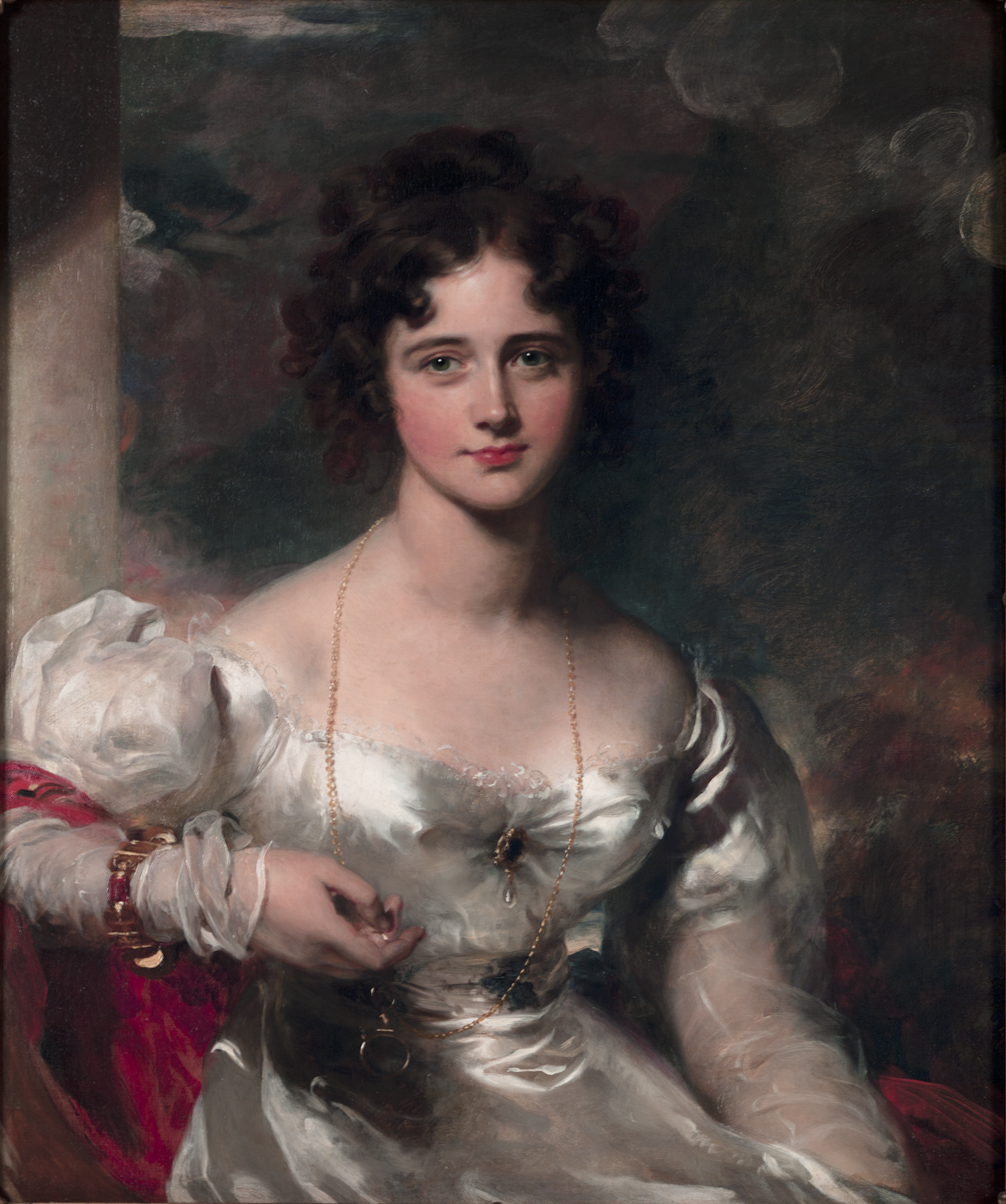
Portrait of Rosamond Croker, 1827

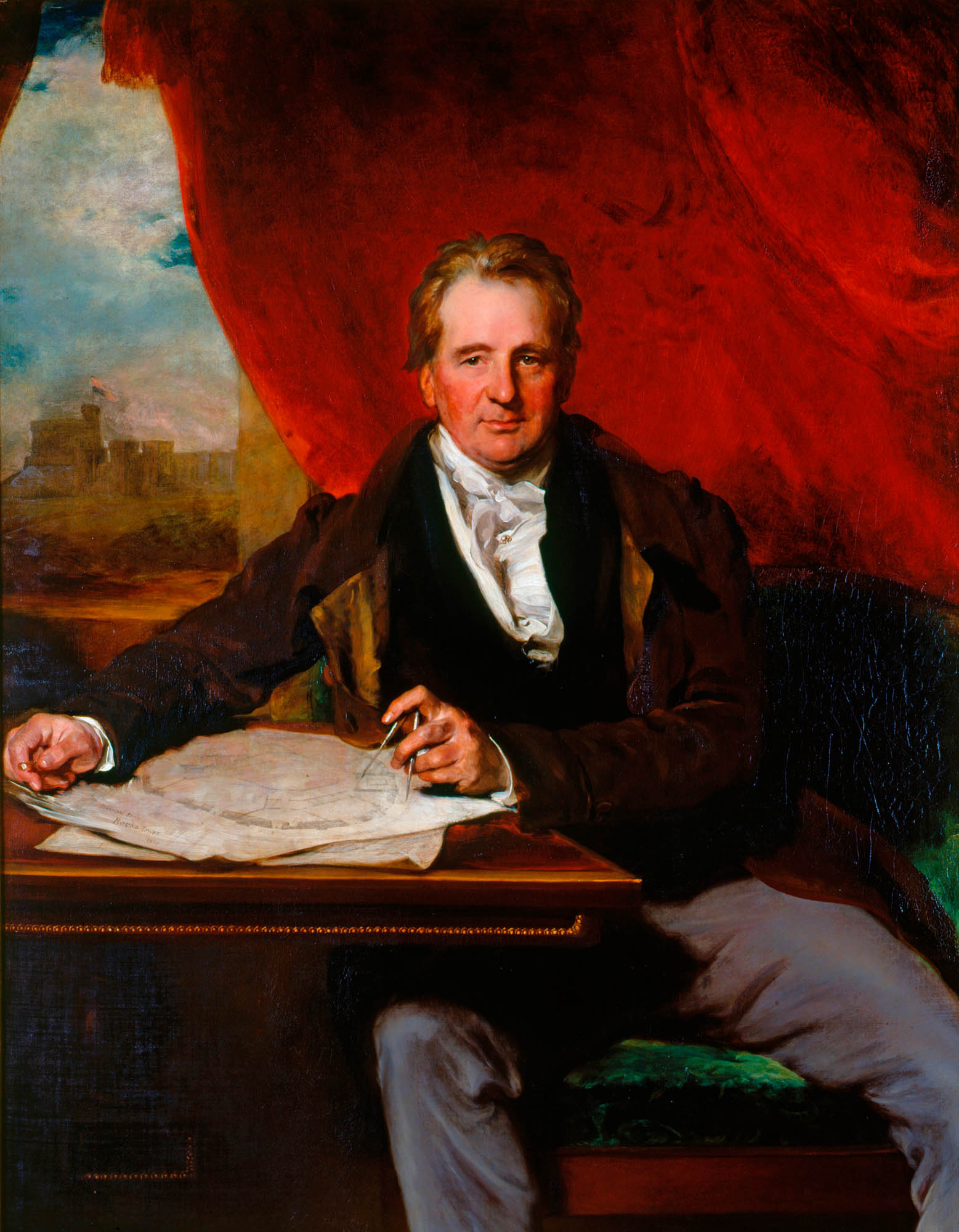
Portrait of Jeffry Wyatville, 1828

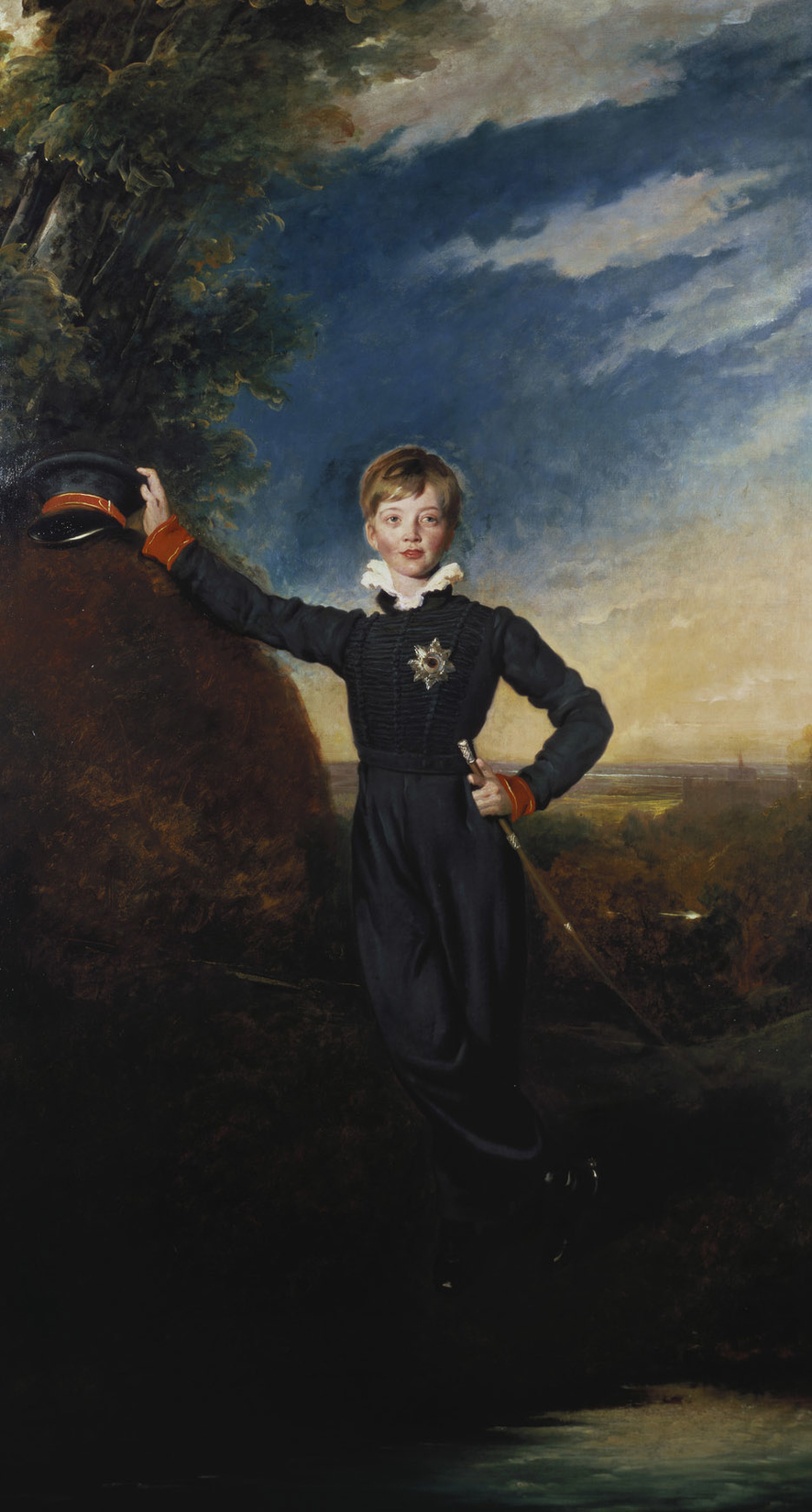
George, Duke of Cumberland, 1828

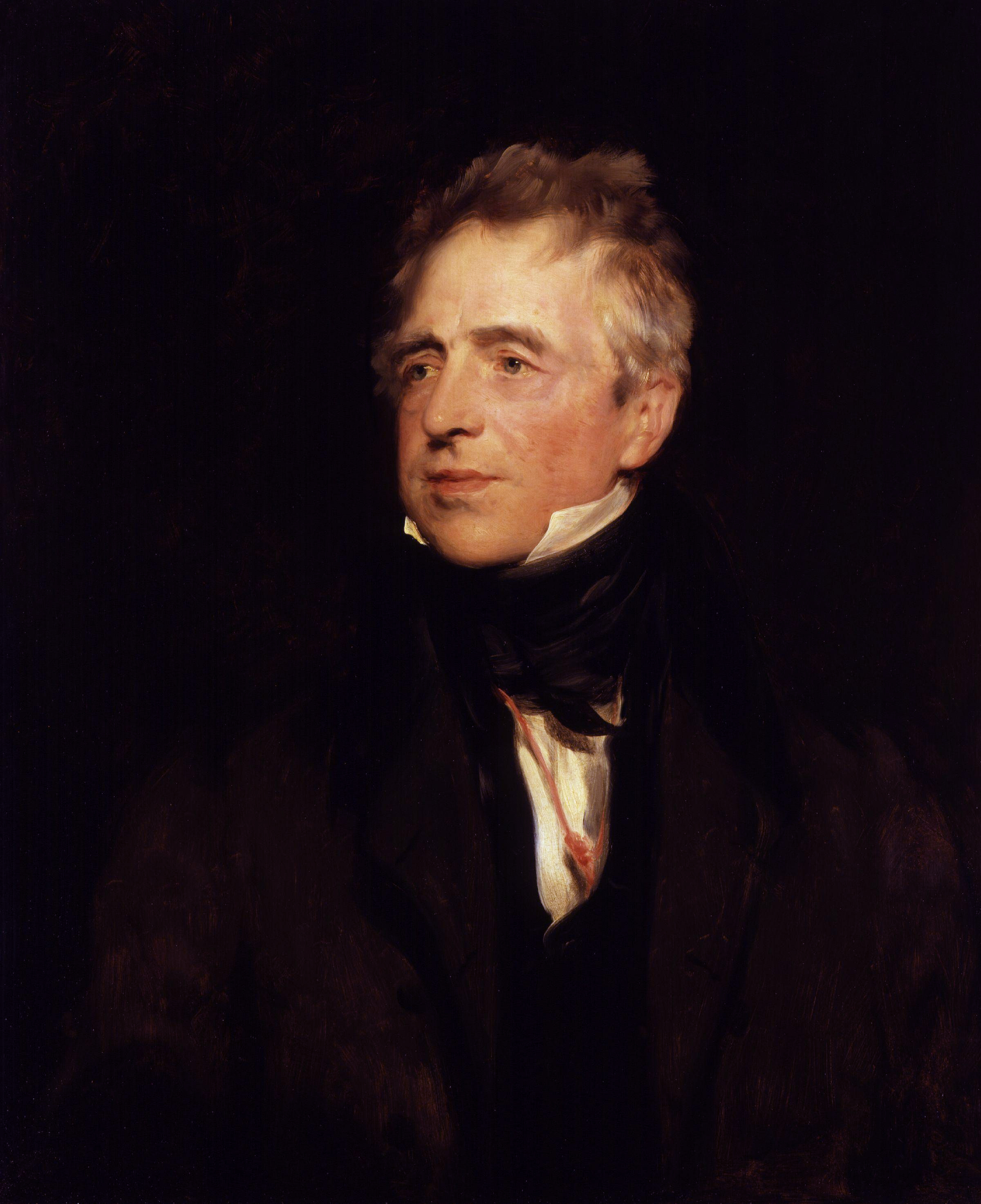
John Fawcett, 1828

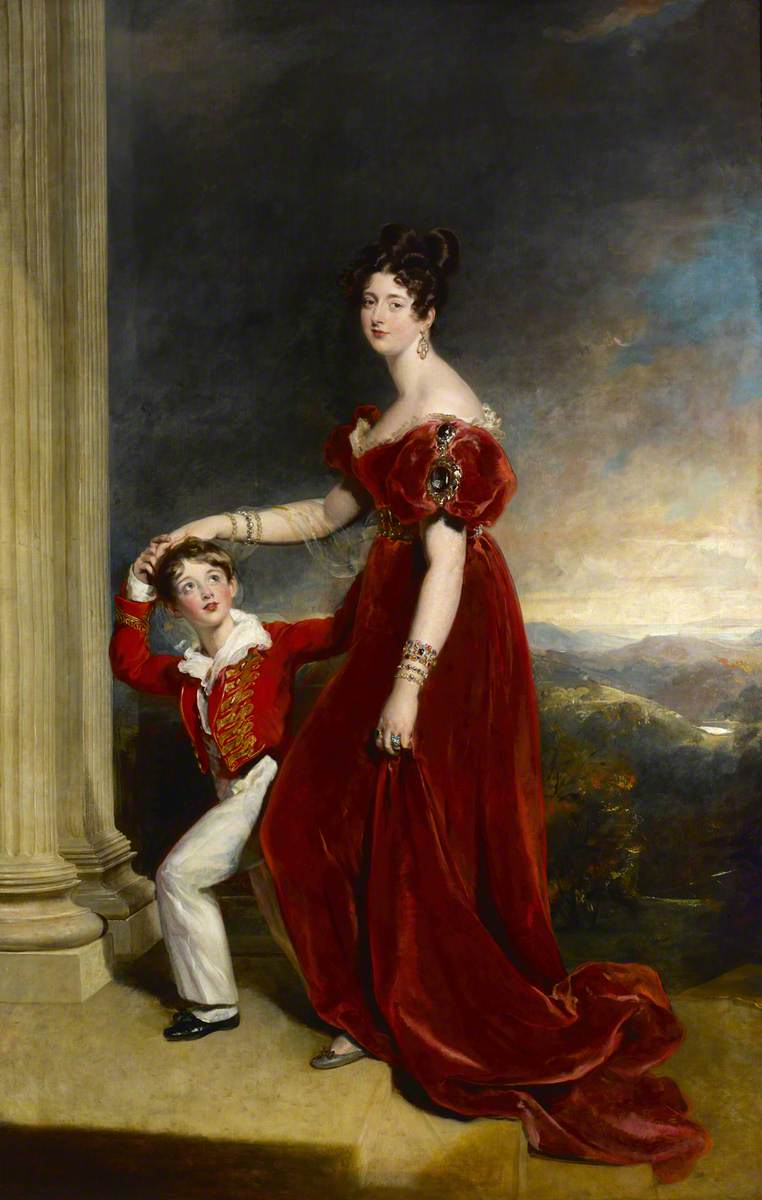
Marchioness of Londonderry and her son George, 1828

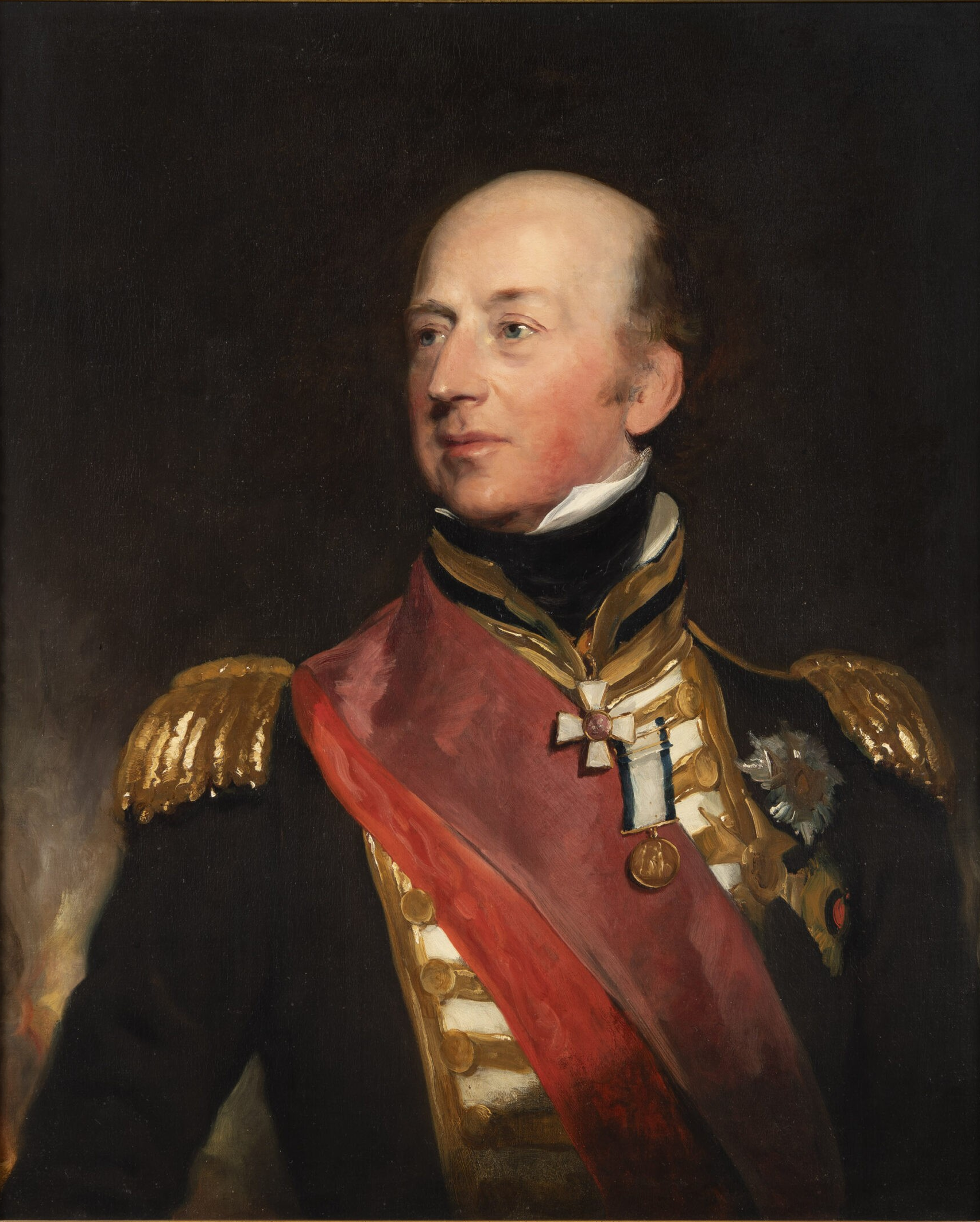
Portrait of Edward Codrington, 1828

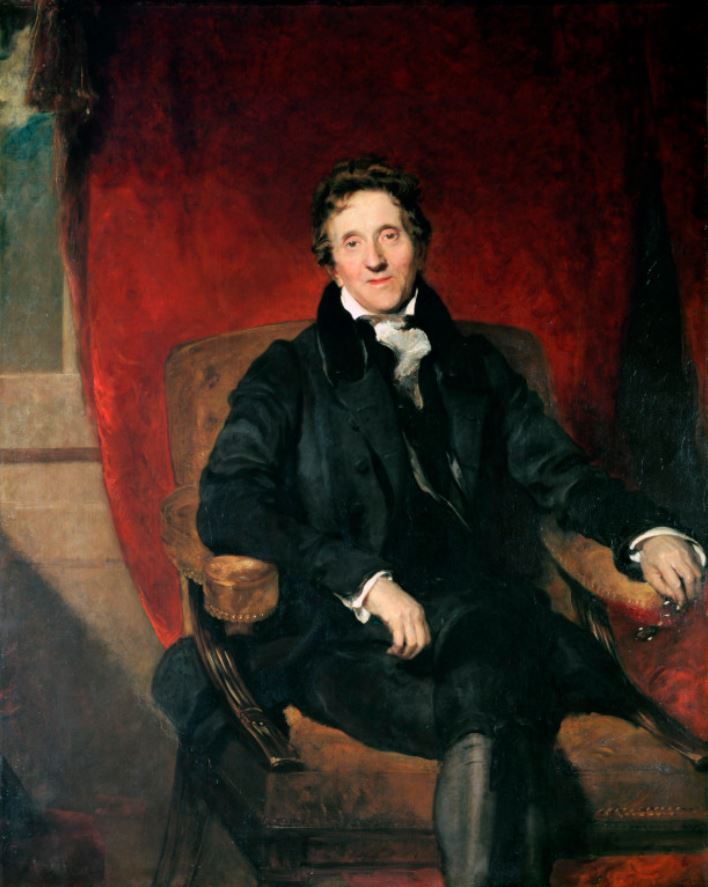
Portrait of John Soane, 1829

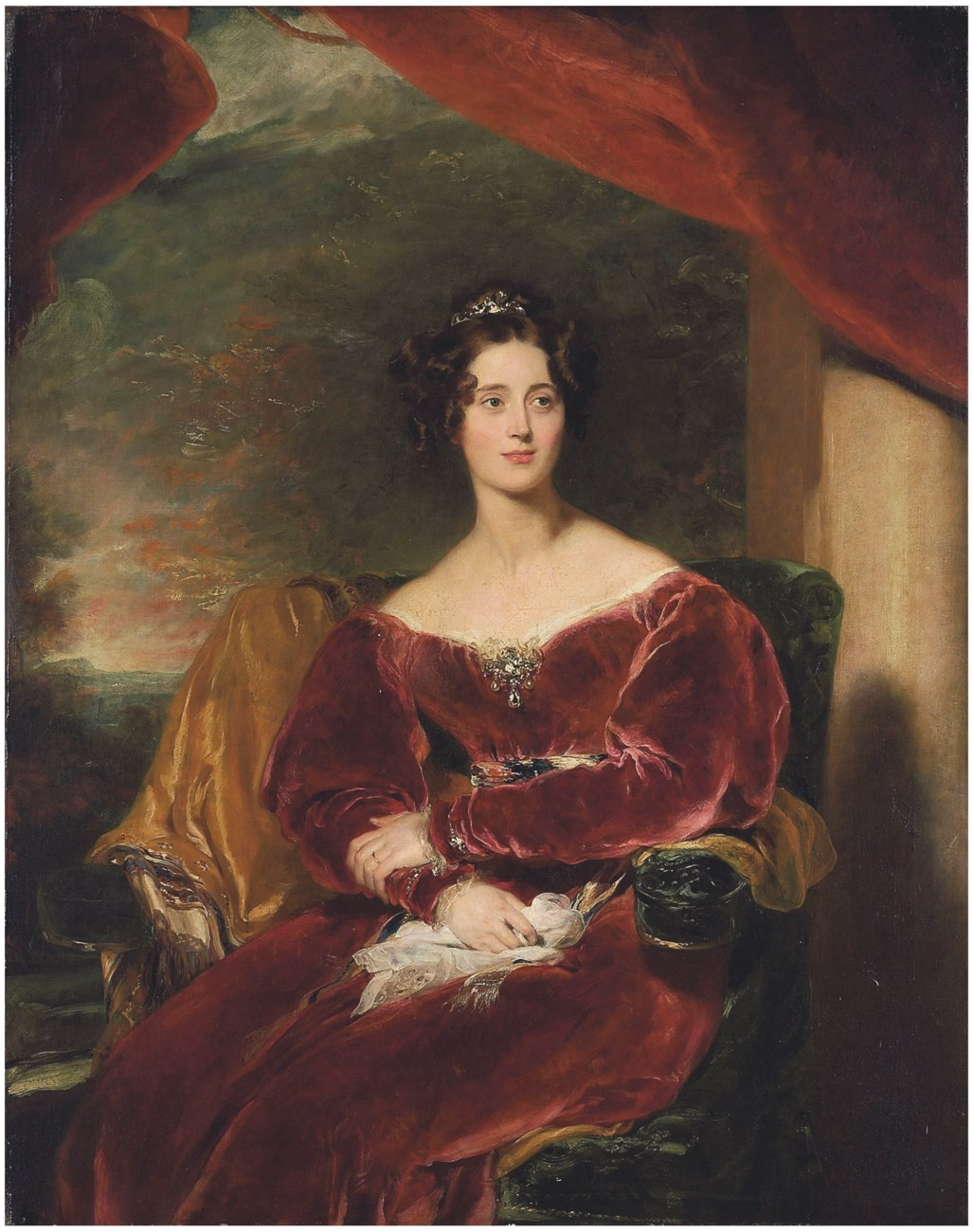
Portrait of the Countess of Wilton. 1829

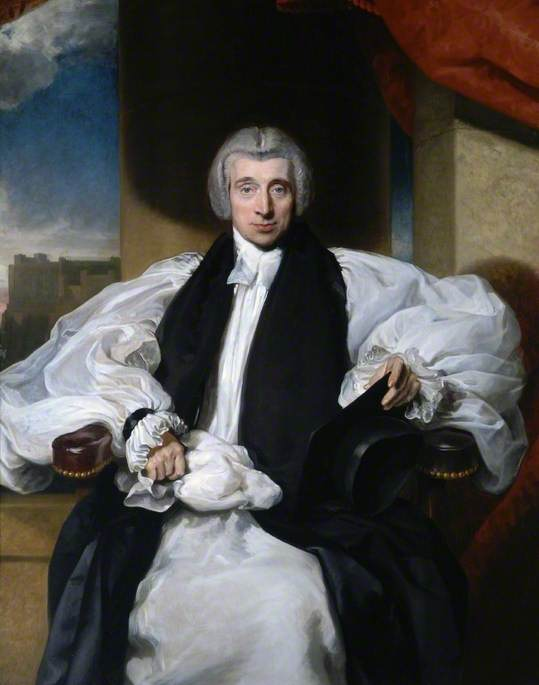
William Van Mildert, 1829

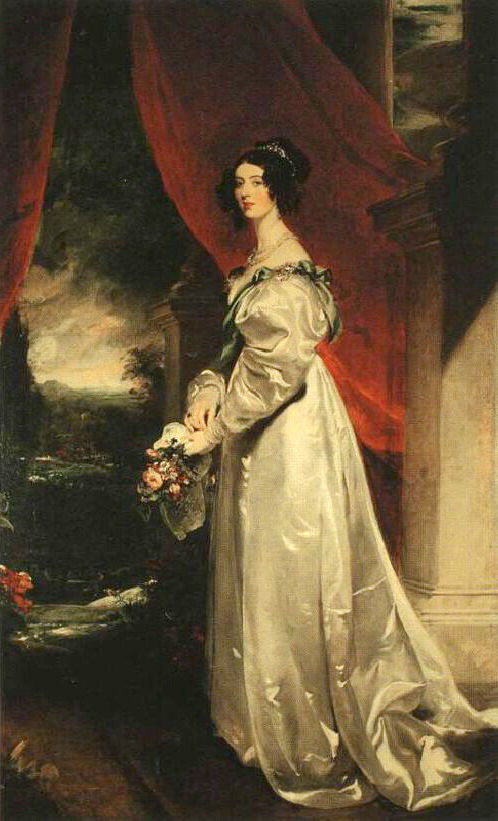
Duchess of Richmond, 1829

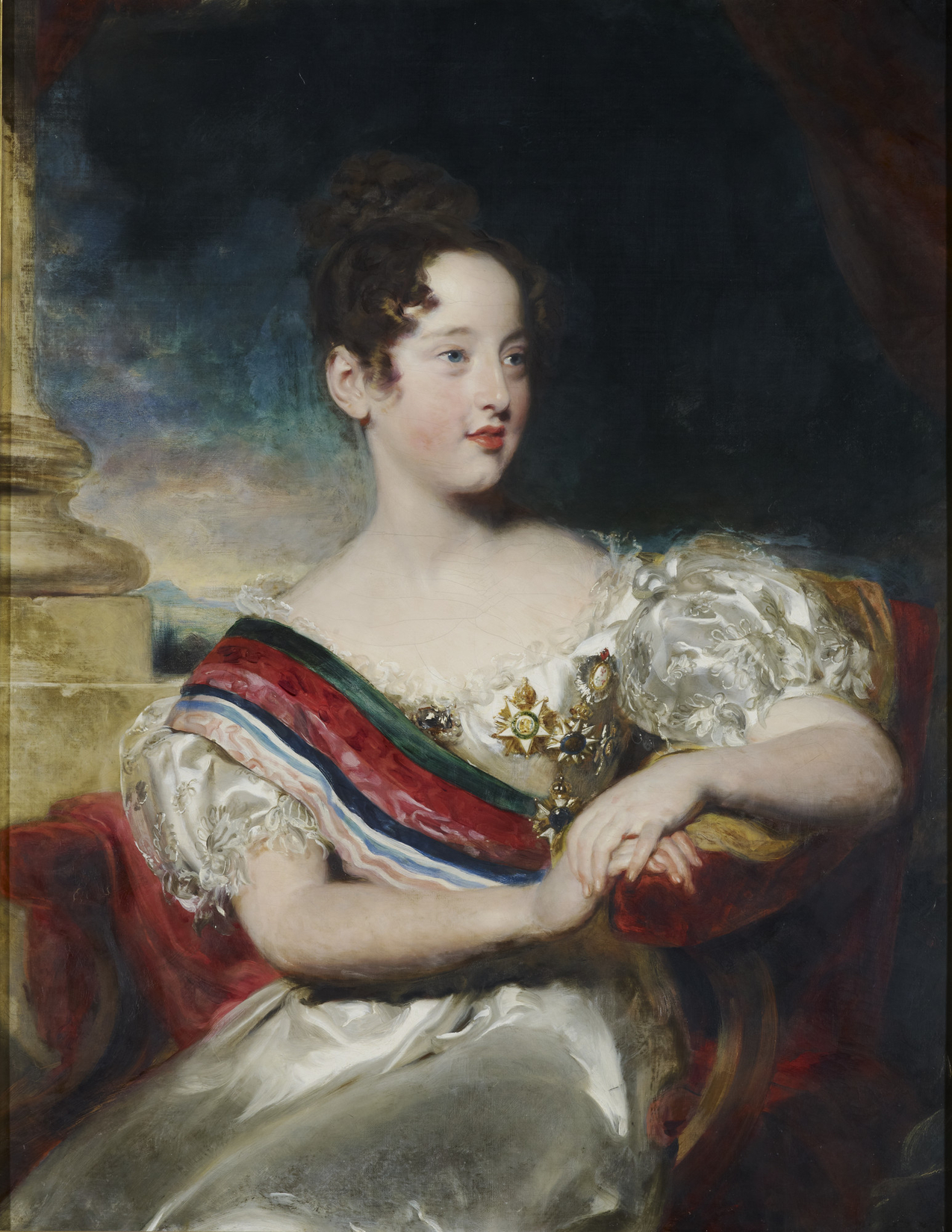
Portrait of Maria II, 1829

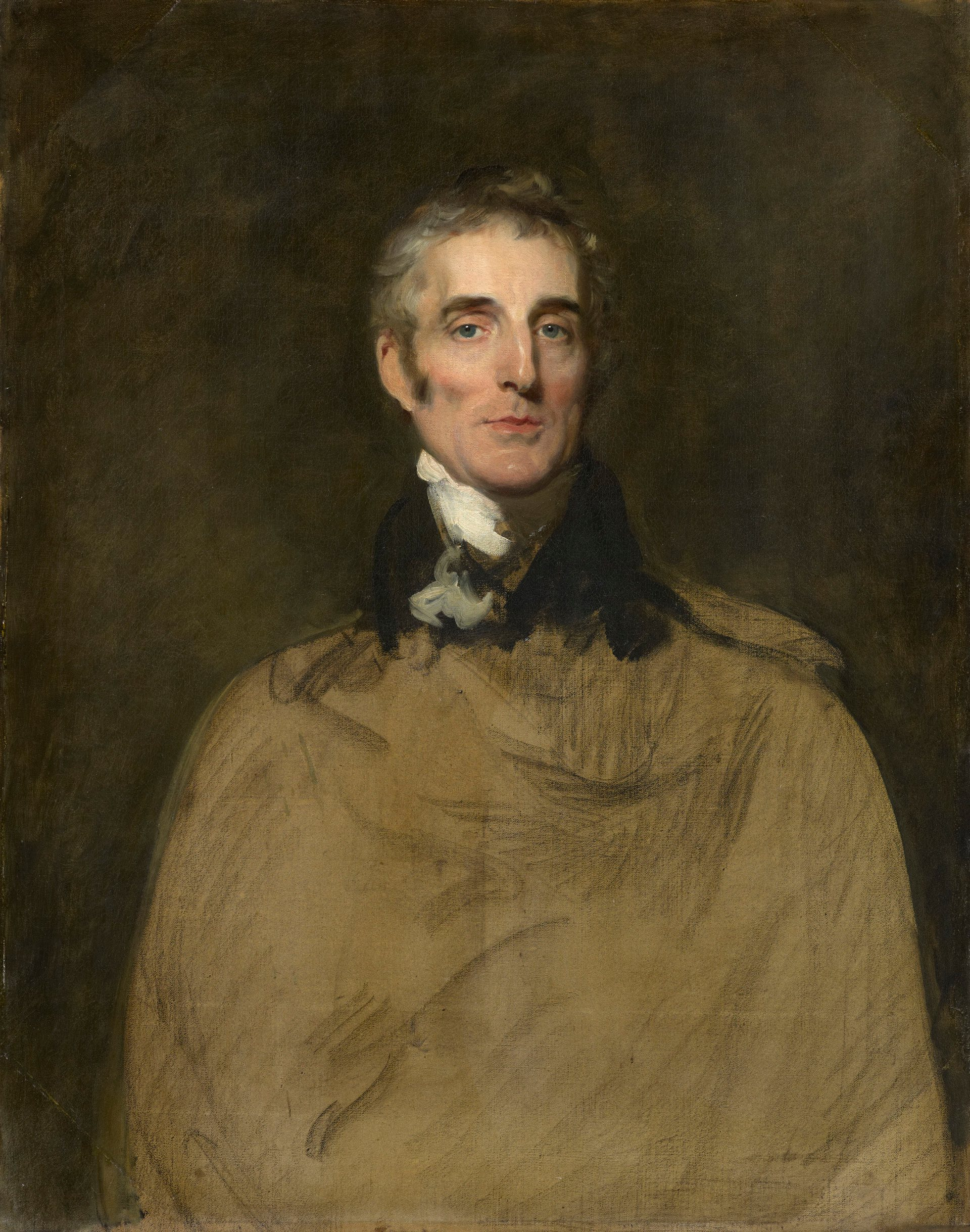
Unfinished Wellington, 1829

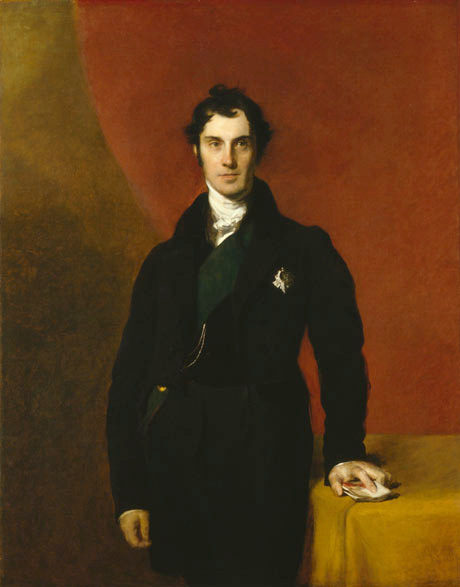
Portrait of Lord Aberdeen, 1830

== See also ==
- English school of painting

== Bibliography ==
- D Goldring, 1951, Regency portrait painter: the life of Sir Thomas Lawrence, P.R.A. London: Macdonald.
- M Levey, 2005, Sir Thomas Lawrence. New Haven and London: Yale University Press.
- Lloyd, Stephen. " 'Thomas Lawrence: Regency Power & Brilliance'." British Art Journal 11.2 (2010): 104–109.

Court offices
Preceded by Sir Joshua Reynolds	Principal Painter in Ordinary to the King; 1792–1830	Succeeded by David Wilkie
Cultural offices
Preceded by Benjamin West	President of the Royal Academy; 1820–1830	Succeeded by Martin Archer Shee
