= 1792 in art =

Events from the year 1792 in art.

== Events ==
- 30 April – The Royal Academy Exhibition of 1792 opens at Somerset House in London
- Ozias Humphry is appointed Portrait Painter in Crayons (i.e., pastels) to King George III of Great Britain.
- François-André Vincent becomes a professor at the Académie royale de peinture et de sculpture in Paris.
- The Nationalmuseum in Stockholm, Sweden, is founded as the Kungliga Museet ("Royal Museum").

== Works ==
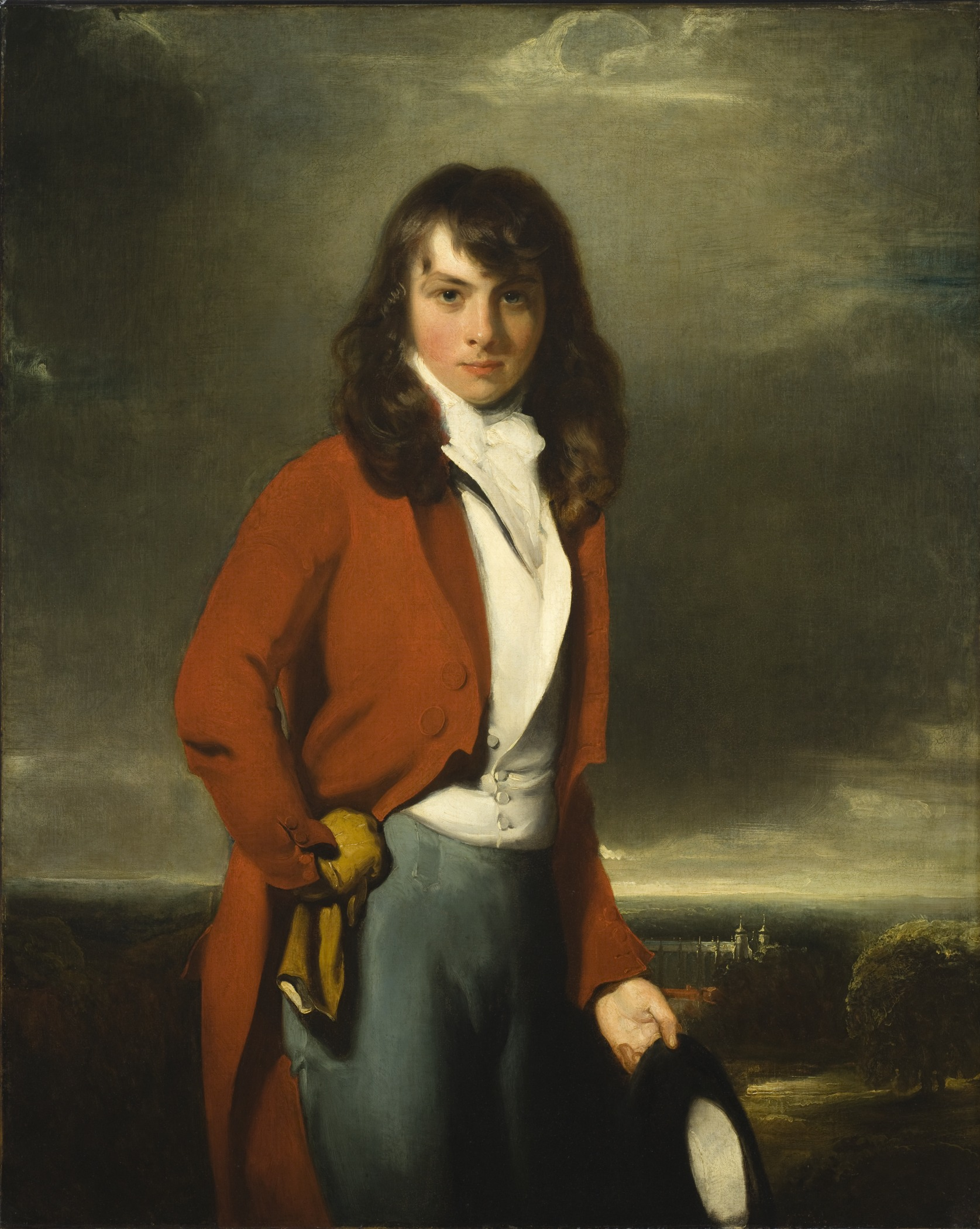
Portrait of Arthur Atherley by Thomas Lawrence

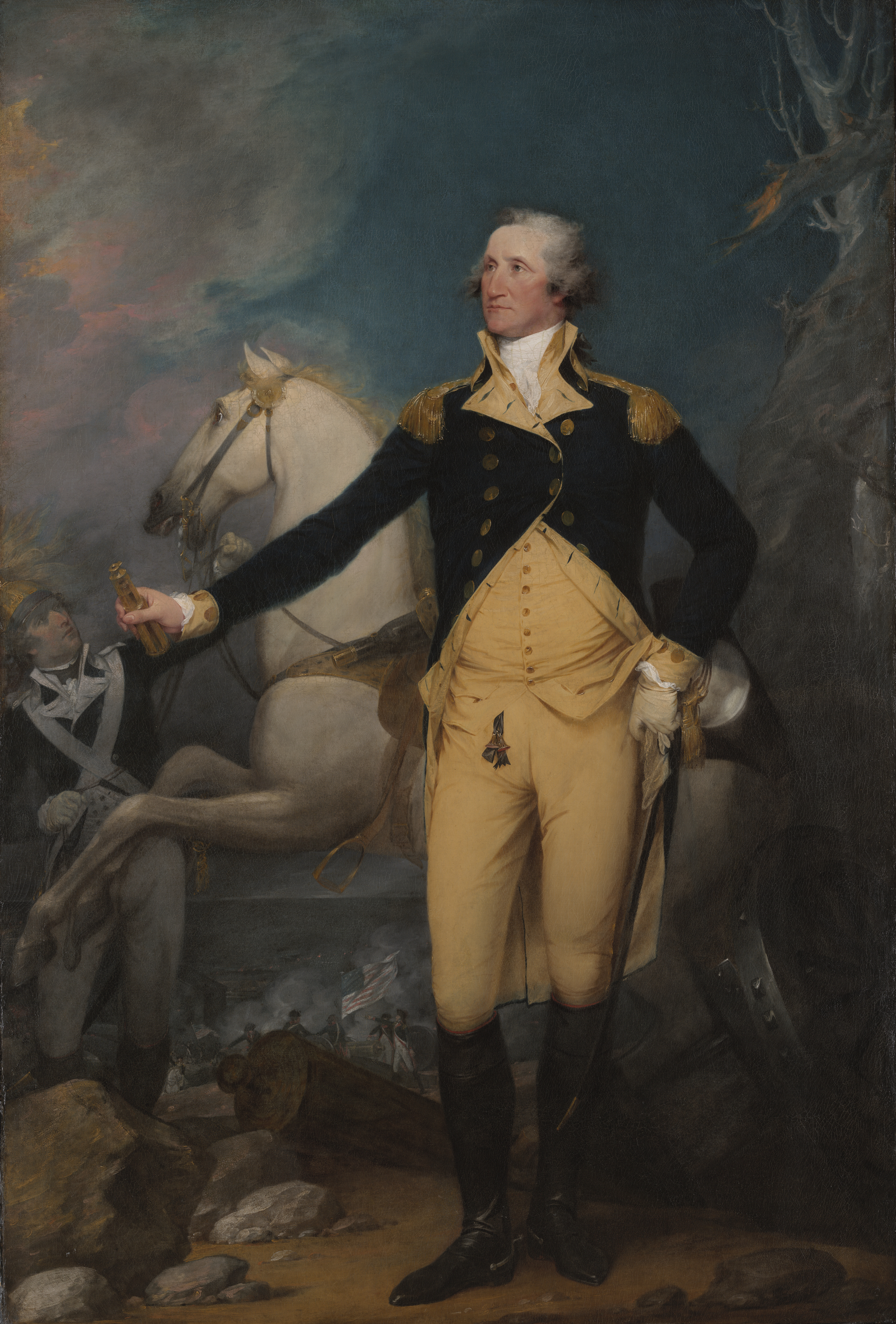
General George Washington at Trenton John Trumbull

- Richard Cosway – Portrait miniature of George, Prince of Wales
- Jacques-Louis David – Portrait of Madame Marie-Louise Trudaine (unfinished)
- Henry Fuseli – Falstaff in the Laundry Basket
- Anne-Louis Girodet – Hippocrates Refusing the Gifts of Artaxerxes
- Samuel Jennings – Liberty Displaying the Arts and Sciences
- Alexander Kucharsky – Louis-Charles, Prince Royal of France
- Thomas Lawrence
  - Portrait of Arthur Atherley
  - Portrait of the Duke of Portland
  - Portrait of George III
  - Portrait of Graham Moore
  - John Julius Angerstein and His Wife
- Philip James de Loutherbourg – The Destruction of Pharaoh's Army
- Élisabeth Vigée Le Brun
  - Anne Pitt as Hebe
  - Lady Hamilton as a Bacchante
- George Stubbs
  - A Couple of Foxhounds
  - Rhinoceros
- John Trumbull
  - Alexander Hamilton
  - General George Washington at Trenton
- Utamaro – Famous Beauties of Edo, Ten Learned Studies of Women and Ten Types of Women's Physiognomies (print series begun)

== Births ==
- February 19 – Lucie Ingemann, née Mandix, Danish religious painter (died 1868)
- February 24 – István Ferenczy, Hungarian sculptor (died 1856)
- June 14 – Peter Andreas Brandt, Norwegian painter and illustrator (died 1862)
- June 16 – John Linnell, English landscape painter (died 1882)
- June 26 – Christian Albrecht Jensen, Danish painter (died 1870)
- August 9
  - Alvan Fisher, United States landscape and genre painter (died 1863)
  - Charles-François Lebœuf, French sculptor (died 1865)
- August 12 – Hans Harder, Danish painter and drawing master (died 1873)
- August 30 – Alexis Joseph Depaulis, French sculptor and medallist (died 1867)
- September 1 – Chester Harding, American portrait painter (died 1866)
- October 31 – Jean-Baptiste Roman, French sculptor (died 1835)
- December 17 – George Hayter, English portrait painter (died 1871)
- December 20 – Nicolas Toussaint Charlet, French designer and painter, especially of military subjects (died 1845)
- date unknown
  - Arnoldus Bloemers, Dutch painter of flowers, fruit, and animals (died 1844)
  - Carl Georg Enslen, Austrian painter (died 1866)
  - Ferdinand Wolfgang Flachenecker, German painter (died 1847)
  - James Arthur O'Connor, Irish landscape painter (died 1841)
  - James Pollard, British painter and aquatint engraver especially of coach, fox hunting and equine scenes (died 1867)
  - Ulla Stenberg, Swedish damask maker (died 1858)
  - William Guy Wall, American painter of Irish birth (died 1864)
  - Thomas Wyon, English engraver of medals (died 1817)
  - 1792/1793: George Mills, British sculptor, engraver and medallist (died 1824)

== Deaths ==
- February 1 – Nicolas-Guy Brenet, French historical painter (born 1728)
- February 21 – Jacob Schnebbelie, English illustrator and engraver (born 1760)
- February 23 – Sir Joshua Reynolds, English painter, specializing in portraits (born 1723)
- March 3 – Robert Adam, Scottish-born architect and interior designer (born 1728)
- May 7 – Aert Schouman, Dutch painter, glass engraver and art dealer (born 1710)
- December 4 – Antonio Ponz, Spanish painter (born 1725)
- December 12 – William Hoare, English painter, noted for his pastels (born 1707)
- December 17 – Gottlieb Welté, German etcher and landscape painter (born 1745/1749)
- date unknown
  - Francesco Appiani, Italian painter of the late-Baroque period, active mainly in Rome and Perugia (born 1704)
  - Manuel de la Cruz, Spanish painter (born 1750)
  - Pietro Scalvini, Italian painter (born 1718)
  - Katsukawa Shunshō, Japanese painter and printmaker in the ukiyo-e style (born 1726)
