= Portrait of George III (Lawrence, 1792) =

Painting by Thomas Lawrence

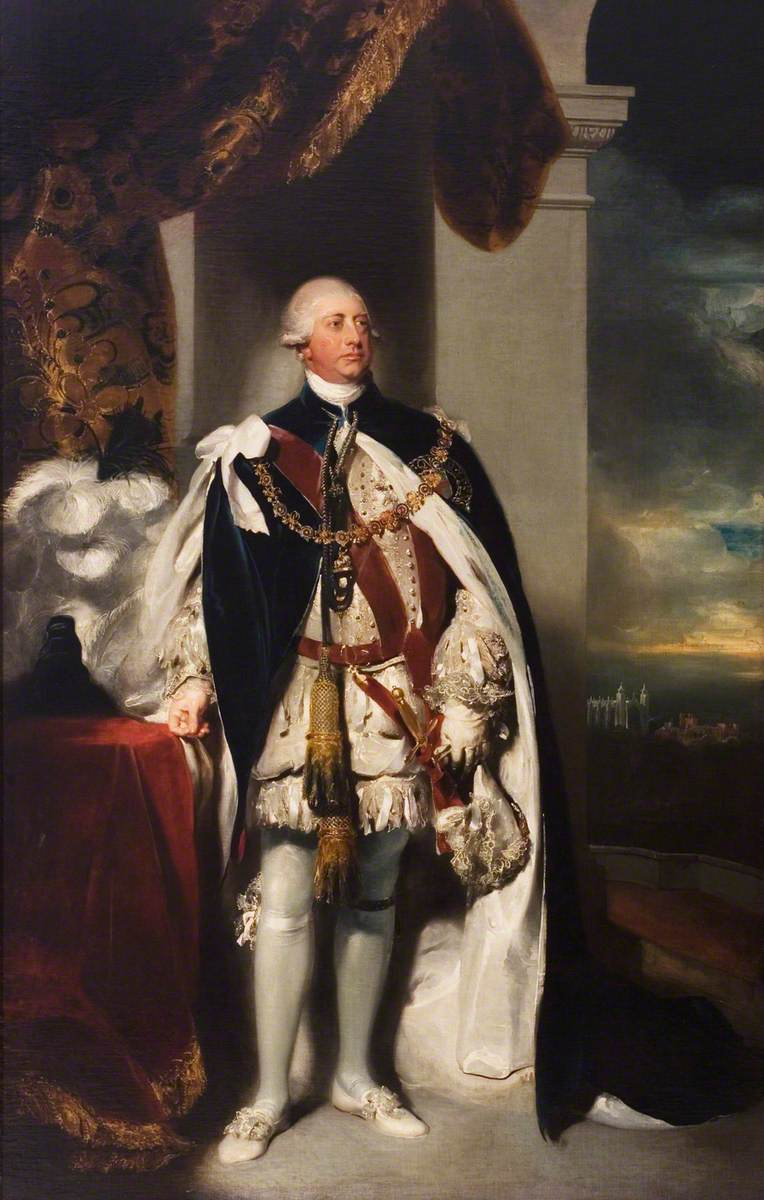
- Artist: Thomas Lawrence
- Year: 1792
- Type: Oil on canvas, portrait painting
- Dimensions: 276 cm × 175 cm (109 in × 69 in)
- Location: Herbert Art Gallery, Coventry

Portrait of George III is a 1792 portrait painting by the English artist Thomas Lawrence. It depicts the British monarch George III shown at full-length in his robes as Master of the Order of the Garter. The background is shown looking from Windsor Castle towards Eton College Chapel.

Around twenty three when he produced this portrait, Lawrence had been a child prodigy in Bath before relocating to London. In 1789 he had been chosen to depict George III's wife for the Portrait of Queen Charlotte. He went on to be the leading portraitist of the Regency era, receiving multiple commissions from George IV including for the Waterloo Chamber. This picture was commissioned by the city authorities of Coventry to hang in St Mary's Guildhall. It was displayed at the Royal Academy Exhibition of 1792 held at Somerset House in London. Today the painting remains in Coventry at the city's Herbert Art Gallery. In 1809 Lawrence produced another Portrait of George III, depicting the king dressed for the State Opening of Parliament with his facial expression borrowing heavily from this work, which is now in the Royal Collection. In addition the portrait of George III Lawrence later produced for the Waterloo Chamber at Windsor we part of a large commission for the Prince Regent was a direct replica of the Coventry painting.

== Bibliography ==
- Holmes, Richard. Thomas Lawrence Portraits. National Portrait Gallery, 2010.
- Ingamells, John. National Portrait Gallery Mid-Georgian Portraits, 1760-1790. National Portrait Gallery, 2004.
- Roe, Sonia. Oil Paintings in Public Ownership in Warwickshire. Public Catalogue Foundation, 2009.
