= The Institution of the Order of the Garter =

Painting by Benjamin West

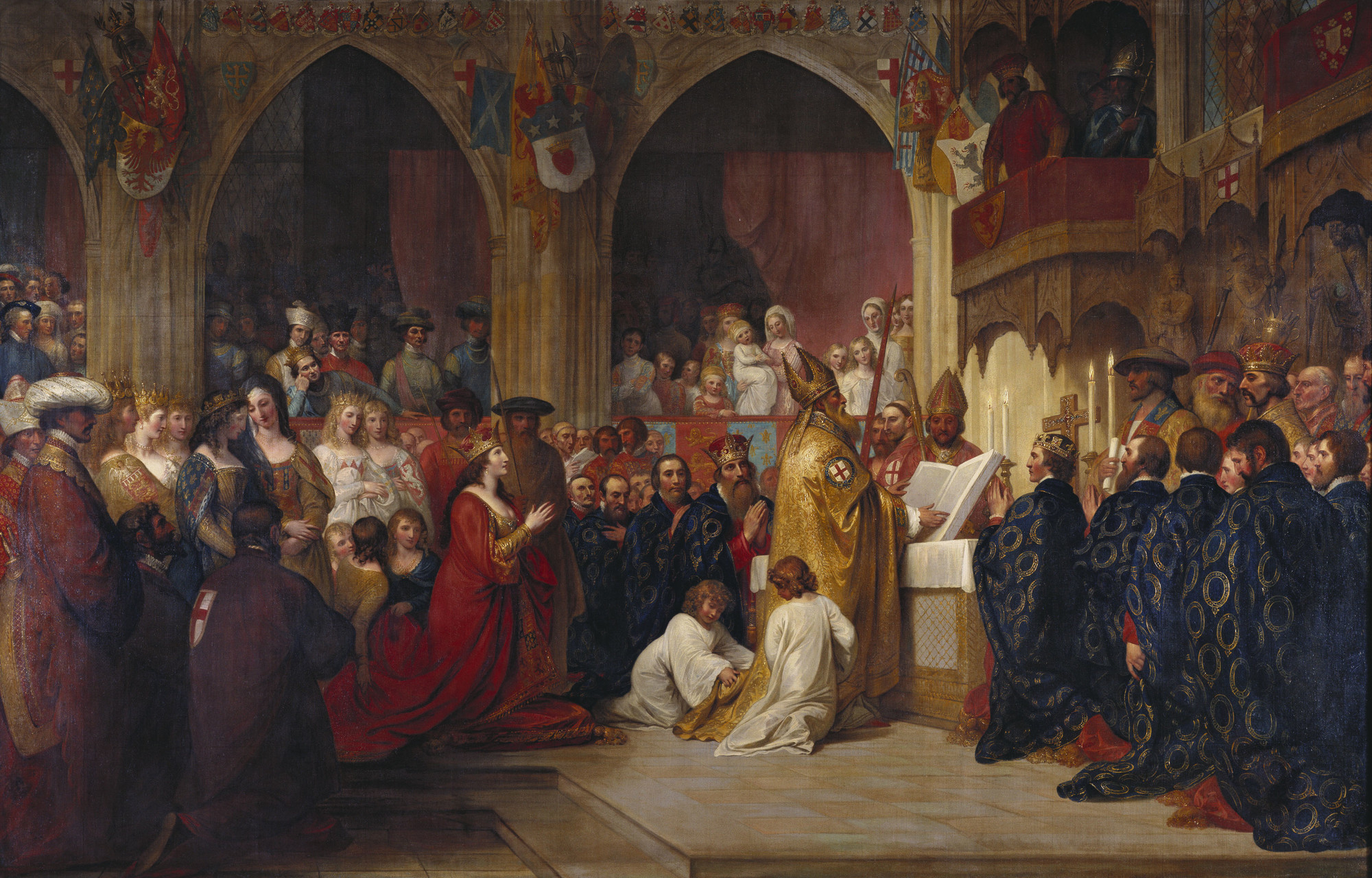
- Artist: Benjamin West
- Year: 1787
- Type: History painting
- Medium: Oil on canvas
- Dimensions: 289.9 cm × 448.8 cm (114.1 in × 176.7 in)
- Location: Royal Collection, London

The Institution of the Order of the Garter is a history painting of 1787 by the American-British artist Benjamin West. It was part of a series featuring scenes from the reign of Edward III during the fourteenth century, produced by West for George III. It depicts the founding ceremony of the Order of the Garter, created as England's premier order of chivalry, in 1348 at St George's Chapel in Windsor Castle. The King, his son and heir Edward the Black Prince and the other knights of the order kneel by an altar where a bishop blesses the statutes. Queen Philippa kneels at the left with her ladies-in-waiting behind her and a large crowd of spectators. At George III's request a self-portrait of West was added to the painting on the far left, with the face possibly executed by his pupil Gilbert Stuart. West received 1,300 guineas for the painting, which was displayed at the Royal Academy's Summer Exhibition of 1792 at Somerset House. The painting remains in the Royal Collection; as of 2025 it is on loan to the Palace of Westminster.

== Bibliography ==
- Abrams, Ann Uhry. The Valiant Hero: Benjamin West and Grand-style History Painting. Smithsonian Institution Press, 1985.
- Corbett, David Peters (ed.). A Companion to British Art: 1600 to the Present. John Wiley & Sons, 2016.
- Grossman, Lloyd. Benjamin West and the Struggle to be Modern. Merrell Publishers, 2015.
- Mancroff, Debra N. The Arthurian Revival in Victorian Art. Garland, 1990.
- Staiti, Paul. Of Arms and Artists: The American Revolution through Painters' Eyes. Bloomsbury Publishing USA, 2016.
