= Edward III Crossing the Somme =

Painting by Benjamin West

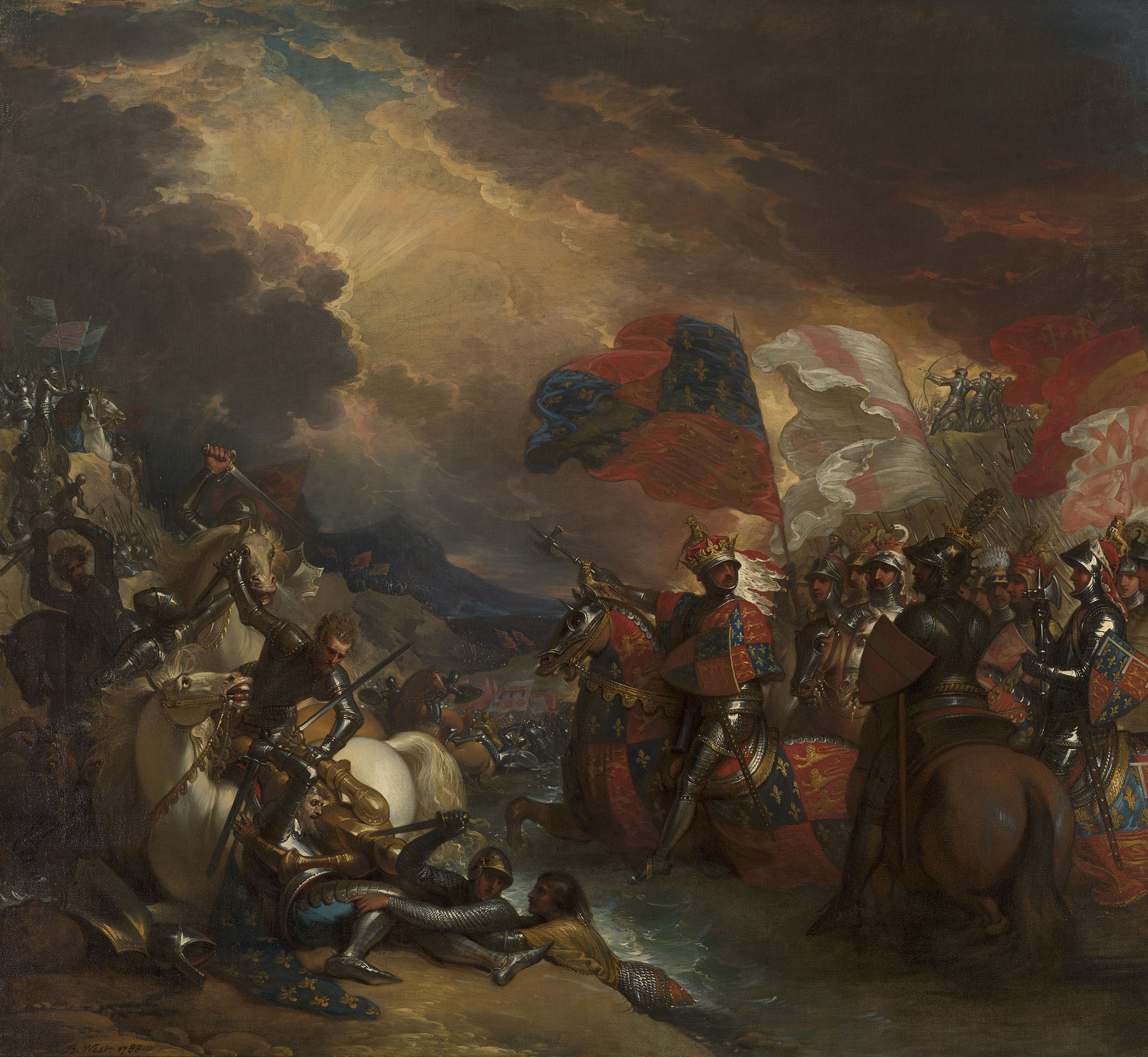
- Artist: Benjamin West
- Year: 1788
- Type: Oil on canvas, history painting
- Dimensions: 140 cm × 153.1 cm (55 in × 60.3 in)
- Location: Royal Collection, Windsor Castle

Edward III Crossing the Somme is an oil on canvas history painting by the Anglo-American artist Benjamin West, from 1788.

== History and description ==
It was one of a series of eight paintings by West depicting the life of the medieval King of England Edward III commissioned by George III to decorate the audience room at Windsor Castle.

West had made his name as a painter of epic and historical scenes with his 1770 work The Death of General Wolfe. He further consolidated his reputation with and The Battle of La Hogue, exhibited at the 1780 Royal Academy Summer Exhibition.

The scene shows a mounted Edward III leading his army across the River Somme in Northern France shortly before the Battle of Crécy in 1346 during the Hundred Years War. On the left of the picture are French forces on the opposite bank. To the right of the King are the knights of the English Army including his son and heir Edward the Black Prince. Above them is the Royal standard and other banners while English archers can be seen in the background.

The battle was a decisive victory for England over France and reflected the series theme of glorifying Edward's reign as one of triumphs. It was commissioned for a sum of six hundred guineas. It was exhibited at the 1792 Summer Exhibition, the same year West succeeded Sir Joshua Reynolds to become the second President of the Royal Academy. Today it remains part of the Royal Collection.

== See also ==
- Queen Philippa at the Battle of Neville's Cross, 1789 painting by West

== Bibliography ==
- Black, Jeremy. George III: America's Last King. Yale University Press, 2008.
- Corbett, David Peters (ed.). A Companion to British Art: 1600 to the Present. John Wiley & Sons, 2016.
- Hoock, Holger. The King's Artists : The Royal Academy of Arts and the Politics of British Culture 1760-1840: The Royal Academy of Arts and the Politics of British Culture 1760-1840. Clarendon Press, 2003.
