= Lady Hamilton as La Penserosa =

1792 painting by Thomas Lawrence

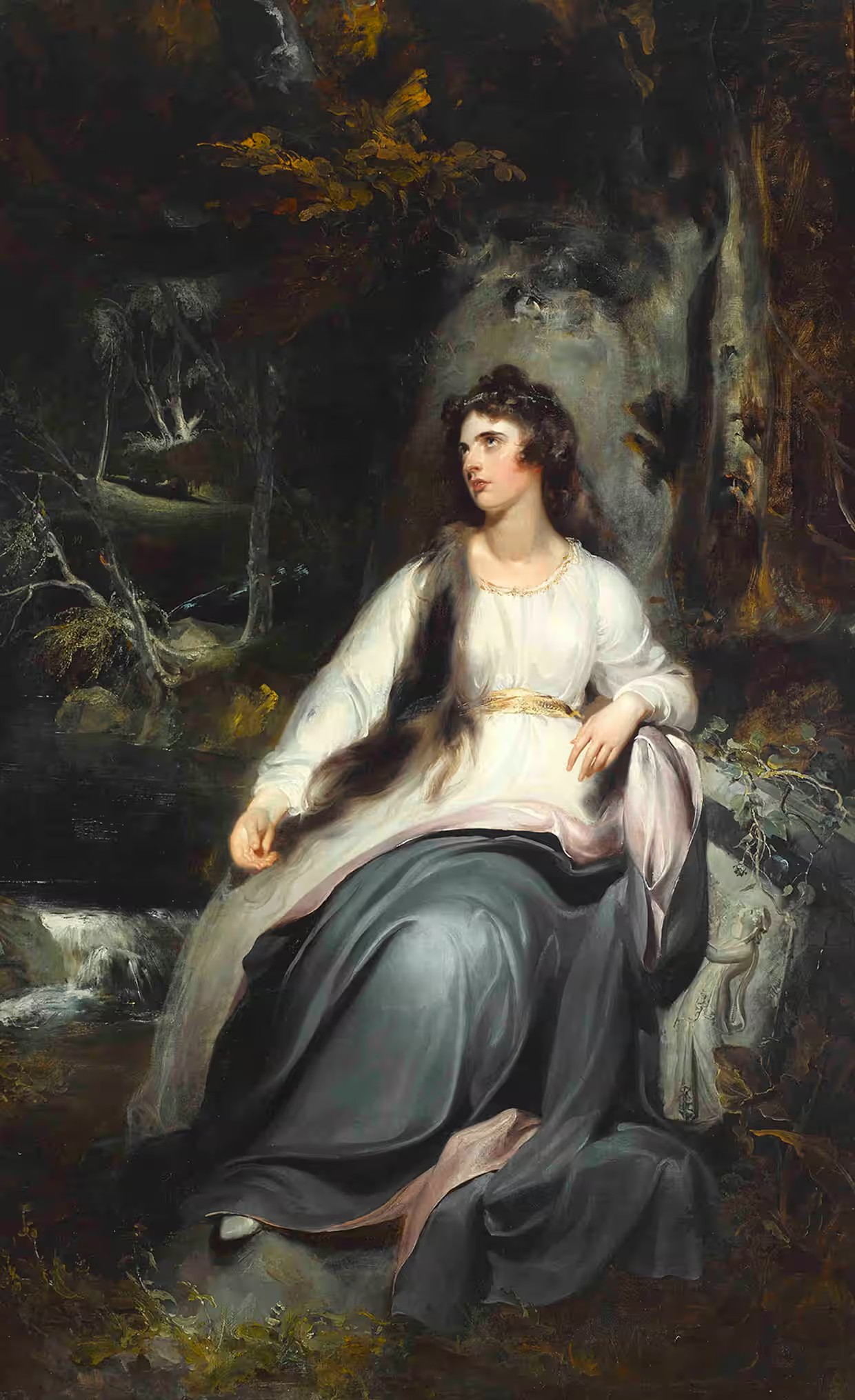
- Artist: Thomas Lawrence
- Year: 1792
- Type: Oil on canvas, portrait painting
- Dimensions: 243.8 cm × 152.4 cm (96.0 in × 60.0 in)
- Location: Private Collection

Lady Hamilton as La Penserosa is a 1792 portrait painting by the British artist Thomas Lawrence. It features a romantic depiction of Emma, Lady Hamilton a celebrated former dancer. The previous year she had married the diplomat William Hamilton and the more intellectual reference might have been an attempt to distance herself from her more salacious past in contrast to George Romney's depiction of her as a bacchante.

Hamilton is now known for her subsequent relationship with the Royal Navy admiral Horatio Nelson, 1st Viscount Nelson. Lawrence painted the work as a young artist early in his career, not long after his London breakthrough. He later became the leading portraitist of the Regency era and was elected President of the Royal Academy in 1820.

The work was displayed at the Royal Academy's Summer Exhibition of 1792 at Somerset House alongside a portrait by Lawrence of George III.

== Bibliography ==
- Albinson, Cassandra, Funnell, Peter & Peltz, Lucy. Thomas Lawrence: Regency Power and Brilliance. Yale University Press, 2010.
- Levey, Michael. Sir Thomas Lawrence. Yale University Press, 2005.
- Solkin, David H. (ed.) Art on the Line: The Royal Academy Exhibitions at Somerset House, 1780-1836. Courthald Gallery, 2001.
- Wright, Amina. Thomas Lawrence: Coming of Age. Bloomsbury Publishing, 2020.
