= Falstaff in the Laundry Basket =

Painting by Henry Fuseli

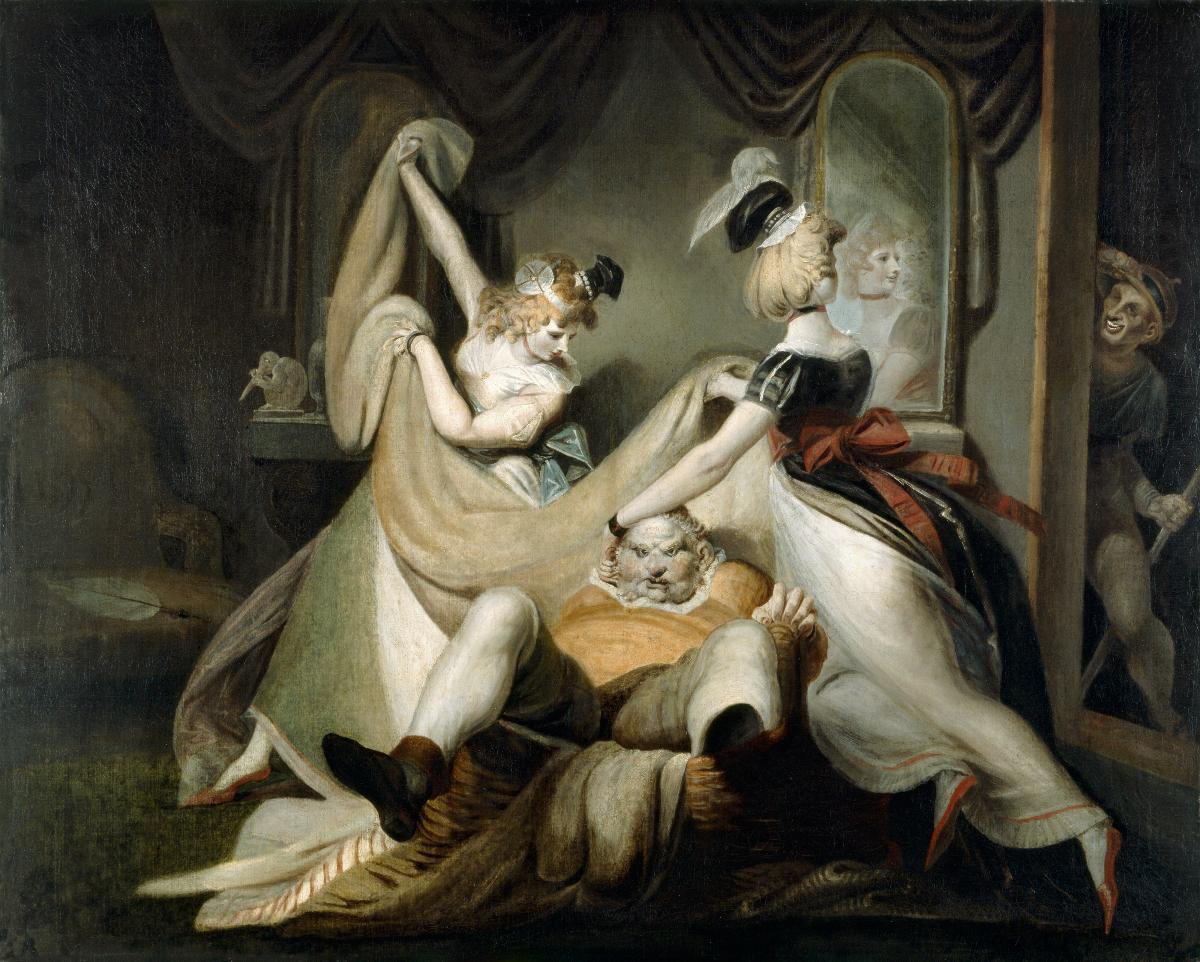
- Artist: Henry Fuseli
- Year: 1792
- Type: Oil on canvas, history painting
- Dimensions: 137 cm × 170 cm (54 in × 67 in)
- Location: Kunsthaus, Zurich

Falstaff in the Laundry Basket is an oil on canvas painting by the Swiss-British artist Henry Fuseli, from 1792. It is held in the Kunsthaus, in Zürich.

== History and description ==
It depicts a scene inspired by William Shakespeare's comedy The Merry Wives of Windsor. It depicts the moment in the play in which Falstaff is tricked into hiding himself in a laundry basket by the merry wives. In the play, the two women plan to throw him to the Thames River.

Fuseli had long been based in Britain and was known for unusual paintings, often featuring scenes inspired from literature and theatre. The lady's costumes reflect the fashions of the late 18th-century. The painting was displayed at the Royal Academy Exhibition of 1792 at Somerset House, in London. Today it is in the collection of the Kunsthaus in his native Zurich, having been acquired in 1941.

== Bibliography ==
- Klemm, Christian. Museum of Fine Arts Zurich. Banque Paribus, 1992.
- Lentzsch, Franziska, Fuseli: The Wild Swiss. Amber Books, 2005.
