= John Julius Angerstein and His Wife =

1792 painting by Thomas Lawrence

- Artist: Thomas Lawrence
- Year: 1792
- Type: Oil on canvas, portrait painting
- Dimensions: 252 cm × 160 cm (99 in × 63 in)
- Location: Louvre, Paris

John Julius Angerstein and His Wife is an oil on canvas portrait painting by the British artist Thomas Lawrence, from 1792. The double portrait features the businessman John Julius Angerstein and his second wife Eliza, who he had married in 1785.

Angerstein was a noted art collector and a patron of Lawrence. After his death in 1823, his collection was purchased for the nation and formed the basis of the National Gallery, in London. Lawrence painted Angerstein at least four times.

The painting was displayed at the Royal Academy Exhibition of 1792 at Somerset House. Today the work is in the Louvre, in Paris, having been acquired in 1896.

== Bibliography ==
- Bryant, Julius. Kenwood: Catalogue of Paintings in the Iveagh Bequest. Yale University Pewss, 2003.
- Levey, Michael. Sir Thomas Lawrence. Yale University Press, 2005.
