= Portrait of Graham Moore =

1792 painting by Thomas Lawrence

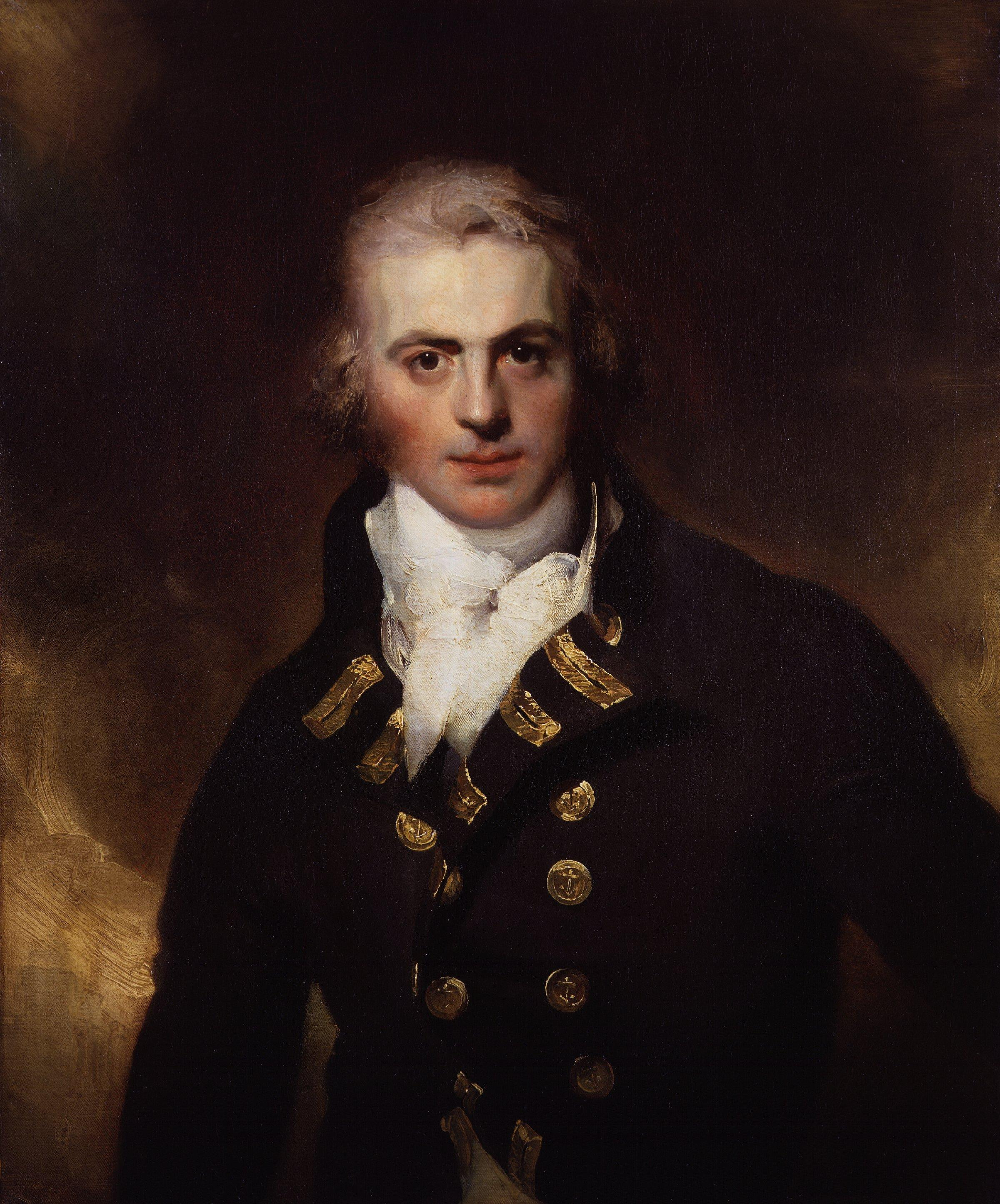
- Artist: Thomas Lawrence
- Year: 1792
- Type: Oil on canvas, portrait painting
- Dimensions: 76.4 cm × 64.2 cm (30.1 in × 25.3 in)
- Location: National Portrait Gallery, London

Portrait of Graham Moore is a 1792 portrait painting by the British artist Thomas Lawrence. It depicts the Royal Navy officer Graham Moore. He is shown in the full-dress uniform of a captain. Moore served during the American War of Independence, French Revolutionary Wars and Napoleonic Wars and rose to the rank of Admiral. He was First Sea Lord from 1816 to 1820.

The Bristol-born Lawrence was a rising young artist when he painted Moore. He would go on to become the leading portraitist of the Regency era and the President of the Royal Academy.The picture was displayed at the Royal Academy Exhibition of 1792 at Somerset House in London. It is now in the National Portrait Gallery, having been gifted by the sitter's granddaughter in 1898. Lawrence also painted Graham's elder brother the celebrated general John Moore, killed during his victory at the Battle of Corunna in 1809.

== Bibliography ==
- Levey, Michael. Sir Thomas Lawrence. Yale University Press, 2005.
- Simon, Jacob. The Art of the Picture Frame; Artists, Patrons and the Framing of Portraits in Britain. National Portrait Gallery, 1996.
- Taylor, David C. Cobham: A History. Phillimore, 2003.
