= George Mills (artist) =

British sculptor, engraver and medallist

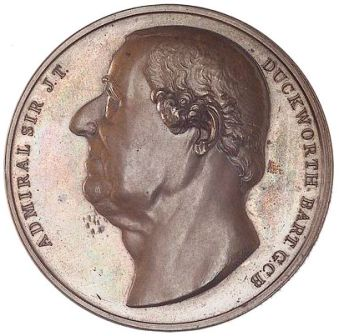
medallion depicting Sir John Duckworth, 1st Baronet by George Mills, National Maritime Museum, 1818

George Mills (1792/93 – 28 January 1824) was a British sculptor, engraver and medallist.

Mills exhibited at the Royal Academy of Arts from 1816-1823 and gained three gold medals from the Royal Society of Arts. He produced a number of coin patterns while employed at the Soho Mint. Some of his works can be found at the National Maritime Museum and the British Museum. He died in 1824.
