= Arnoldus Bloemers =

Dutch painter

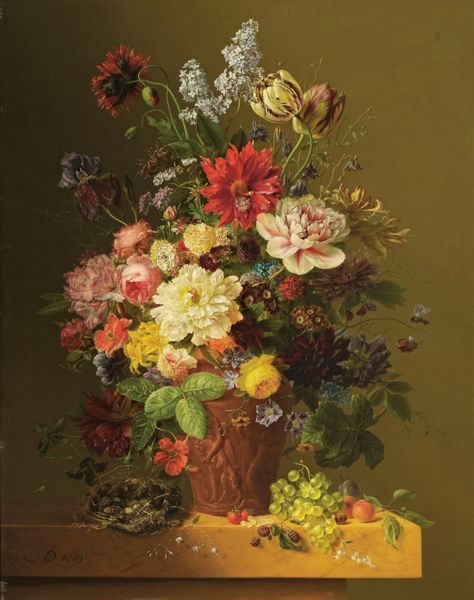
Flower still life, 1839

Arnoldus Bloemers (1792–1844) was a Dutch painter, who painted flowers, fruit, and animals.

Bloemers was born in Amsterdam. He was instructed by Antonie Piera, but principally imitated Van Huijsum. He died at the Hague in 1844. The Rotterdam Gallery has a flower-piece by him. He died at the age of 52 at The Hague.
