= Royal Academy Exhibition of 1792 =

1792 art exhibition in London

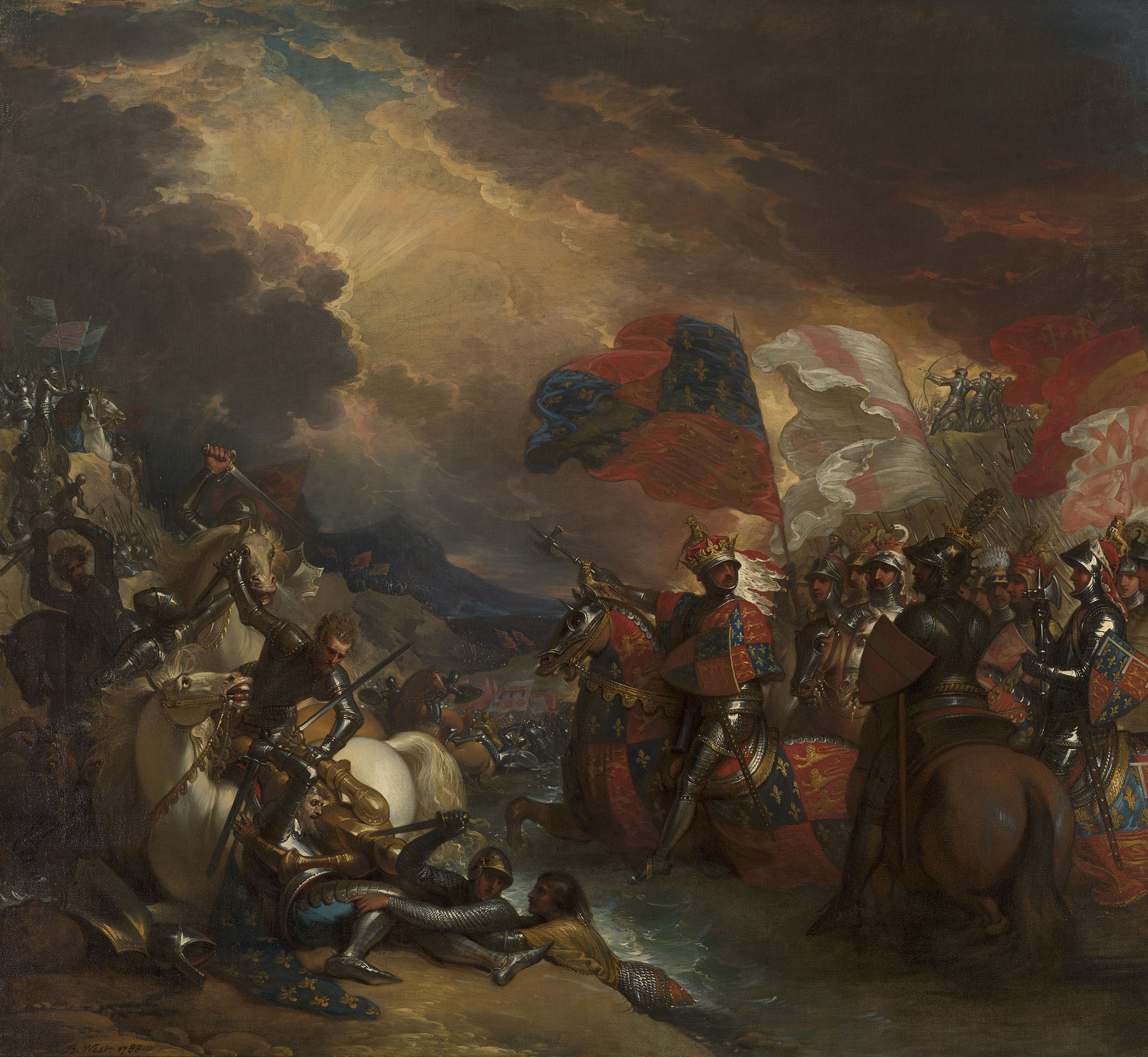
Edward III Crossing the Somme by Benjamin West

The Royal Academy Exhibition of 1792 was the twenty forth annual Summer Exhibition of the British Royal Academy of Arts. It was held at Somerset House in London between 30 April and 9 June 1792. It was the first to be held following the death of Sir Joshua Reynolds, who had served as President of the Royal Academy since its foundation in 1768 and one of the driving forces of British art during his lifetime. Nonetheless, it was considered as showing the continued strength of the institution with growing numbers of submissions and financial earnings.

== Exhibits ==
Reynolds was succeeded as president by the Pennsylvania-born artist Benjamin West best known for his neoclassical history paintings, who decisively defeated his fellow American by twenty nine votes to one in the election. West displayed two paintings Edward III Crossing the Somme and The Institution of the Order of the Garter he had produced for Windsor Castle celebrating the reign of Edward III.

The young Bristol-born artist Thomas Lawrence continued his rise with a series of portrait paintings. These included pictures featuring George III in his ceremonial robes and Lady Hamilton as La Penserosa. Another work by Lawrence Arthur Atherley as an Etonian has subsequently attracted attention. Other Lawrence submissions included pictures of Lady Charlotte Greville and Georgiana, Lady Apsley. John Hoppner featured portraits of the Duke of York and the Duchess of York, who had married the previous year in a diplomatic match between Britain and Prussia. He also produced a portrait of York's elder brother and heir to the throne George, Prince of Wales now in the Wallace Collection.

Francis Wheatley displayed several entries in his Cries of London series featuring everyday life in the capital. George Morland exhibited the genre painting The Benevolent Sportsman.

== Gallery ==
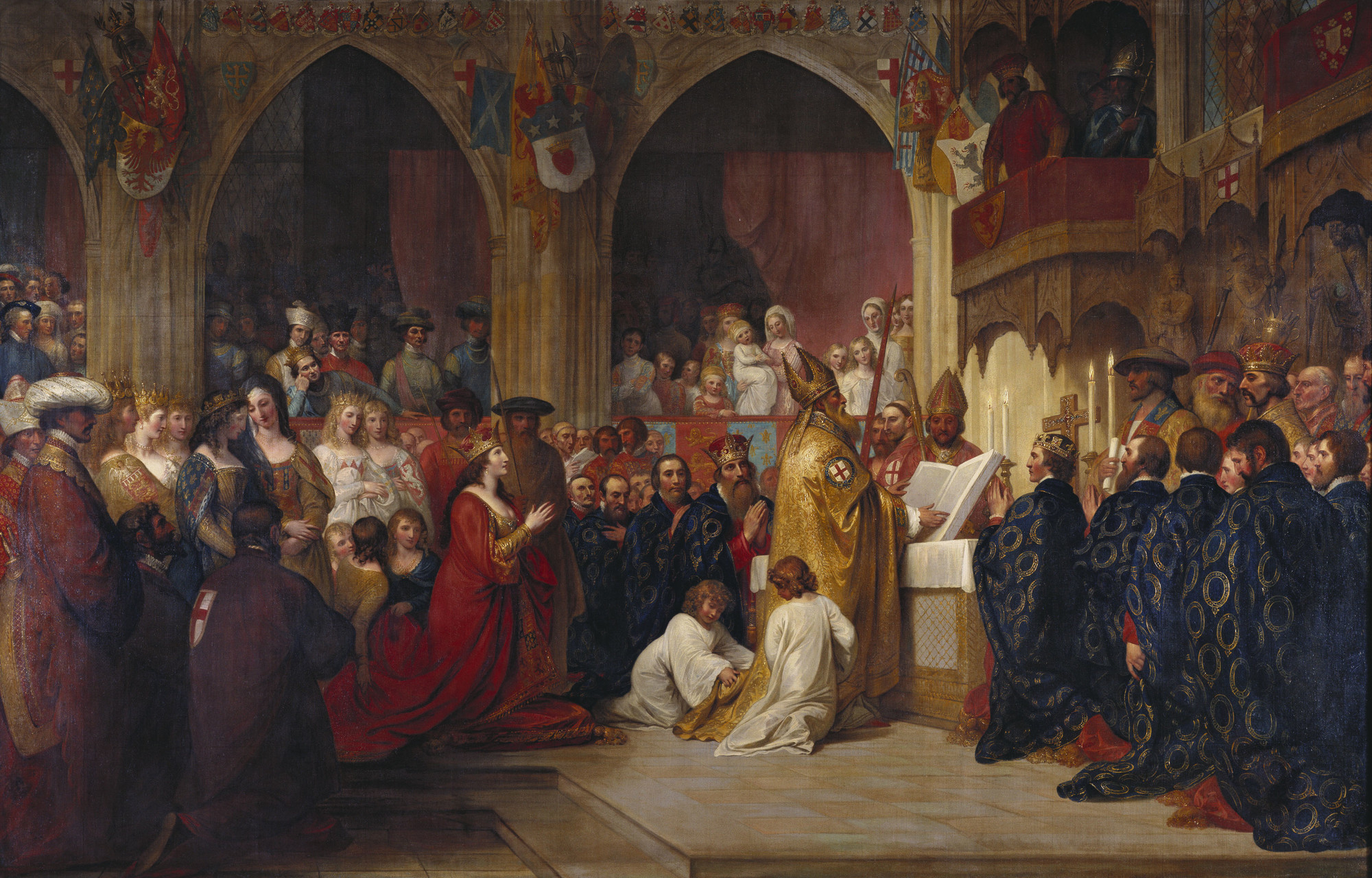
The Institution of the Order of the Garter by Benjamin West

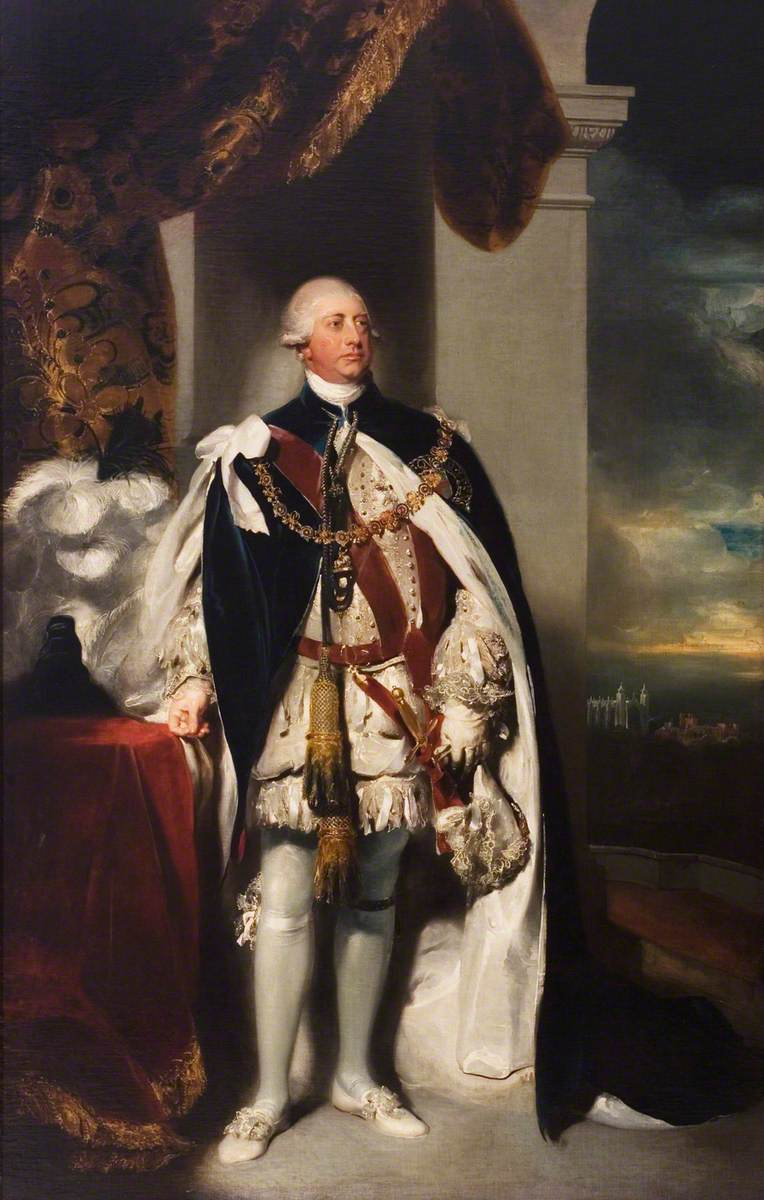
Portrait of George III by Thomas Lawrence

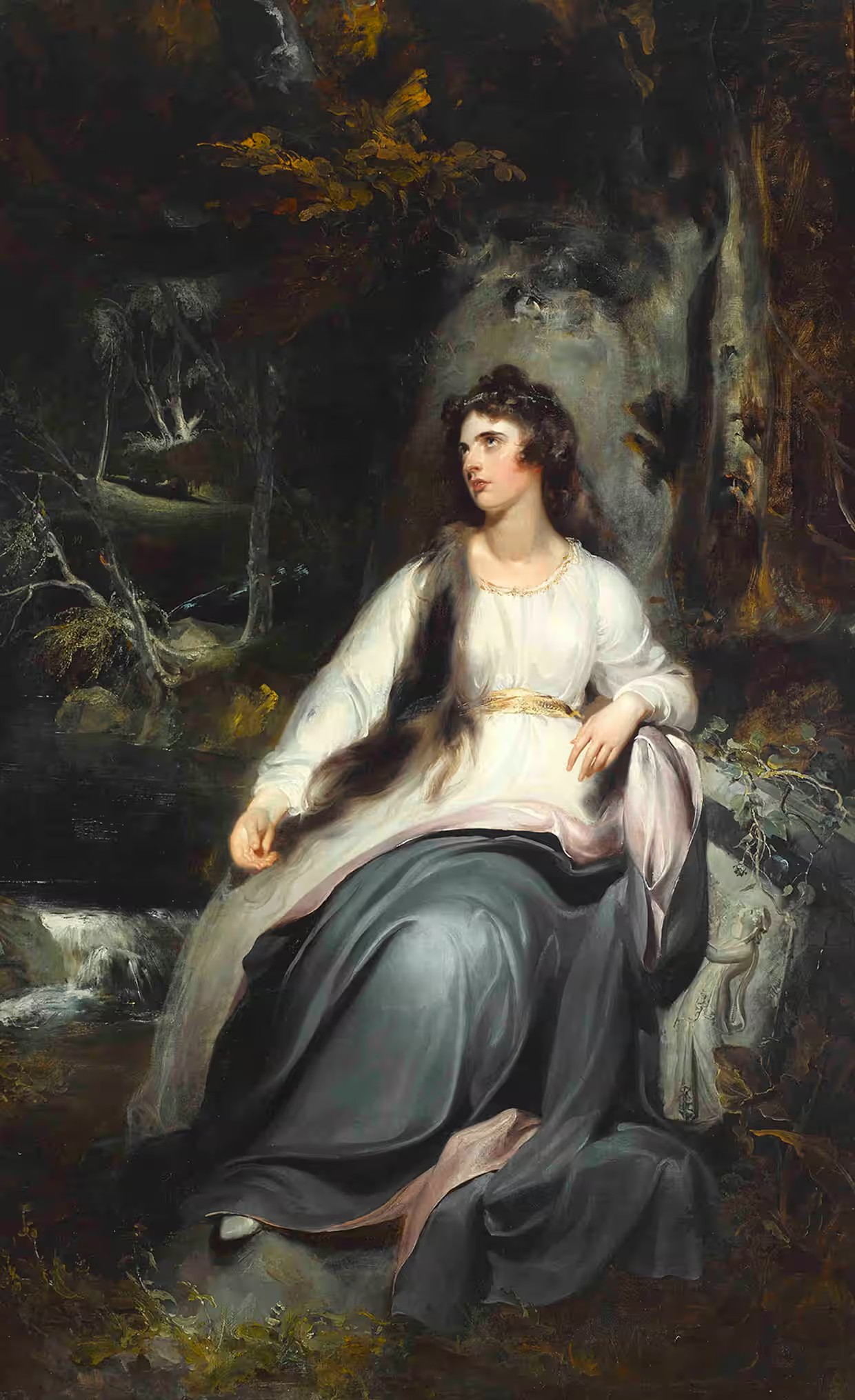
Lady Hamilton as La Penserosa by Thomas Lawrence

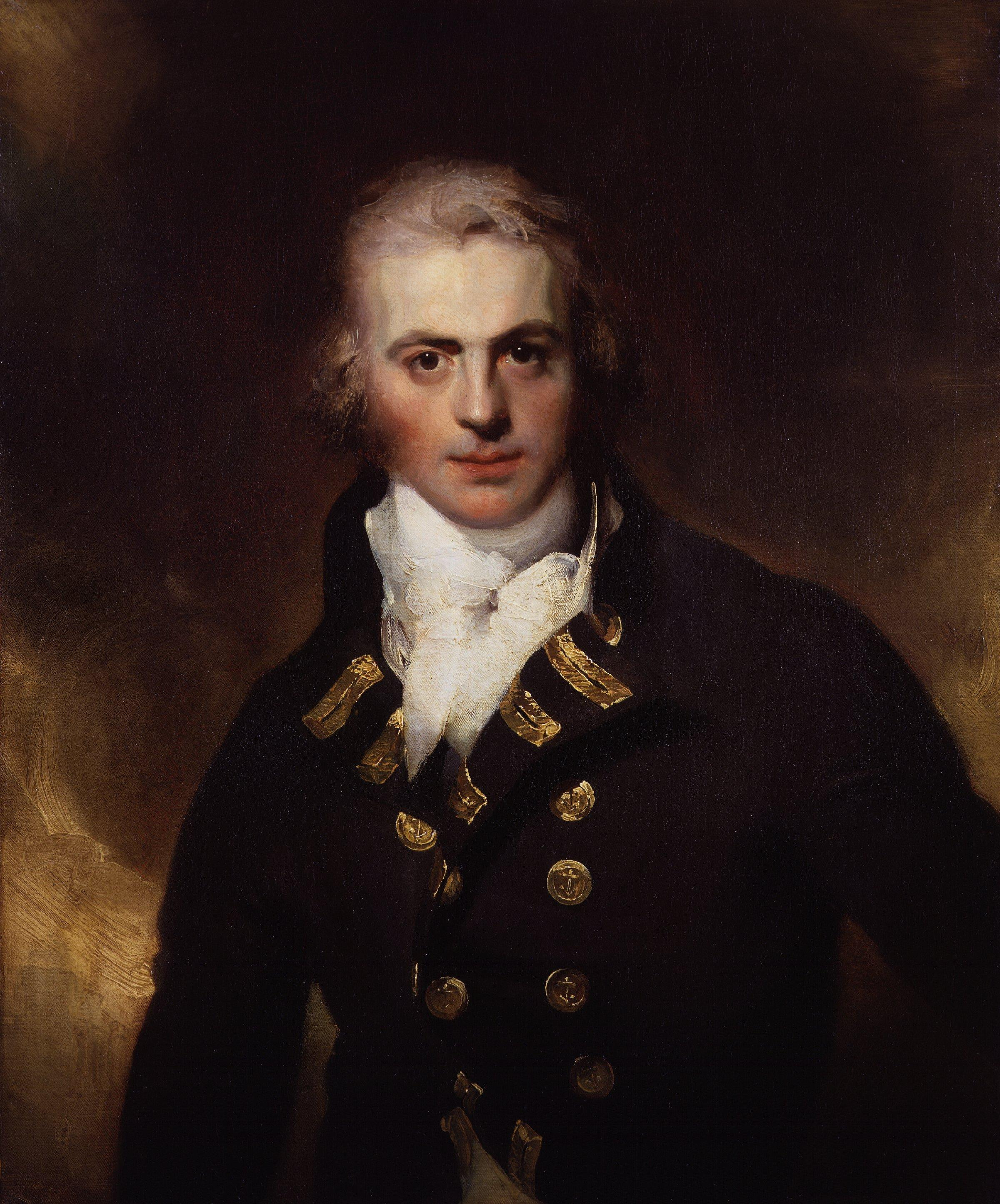
Portrait of Graham Moore by Thomas Lawrence

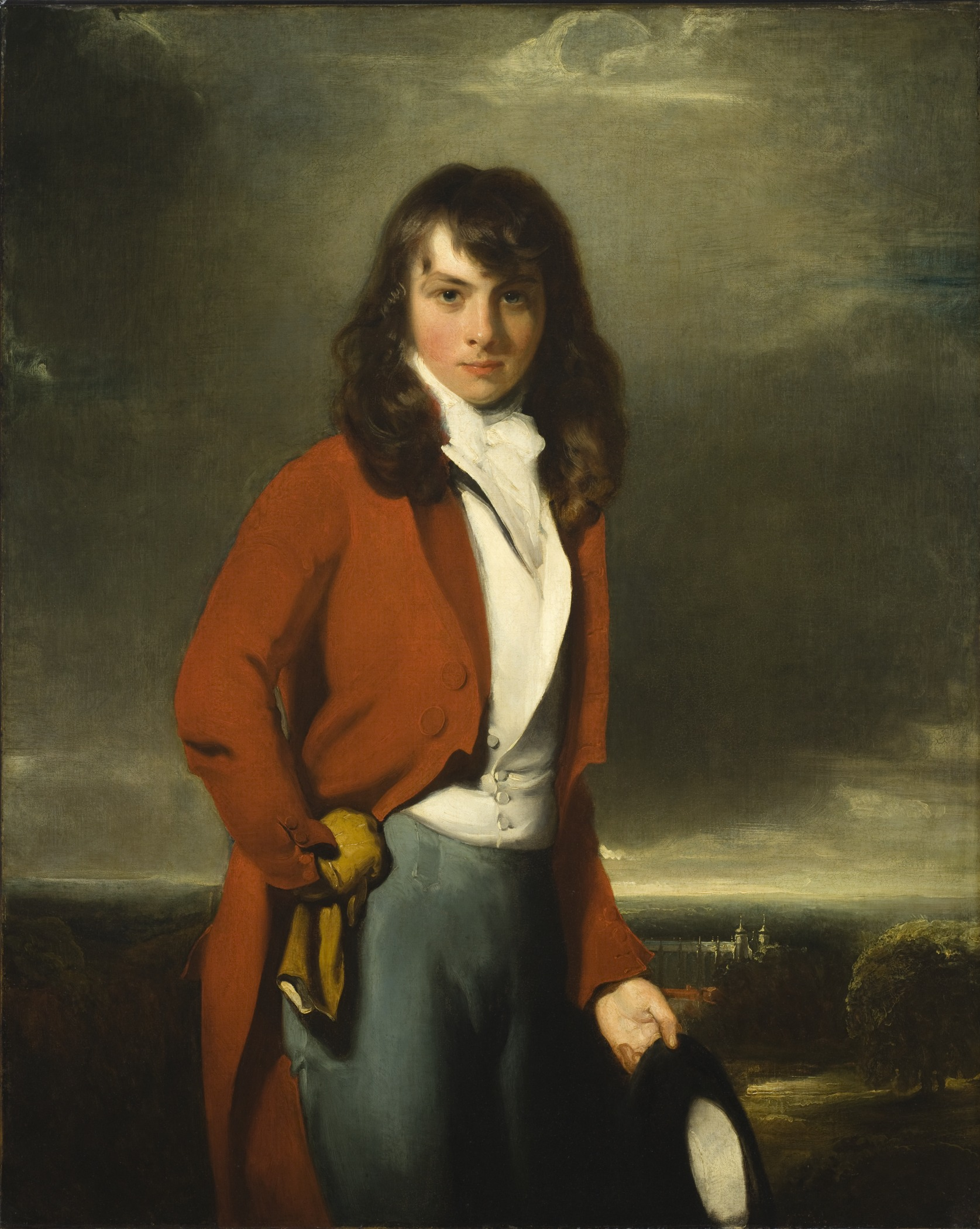
Arthur Atherley as an Etonian by Thomas Lawrence

John Julius Angerstein and His Wife by Thomas Lawrence

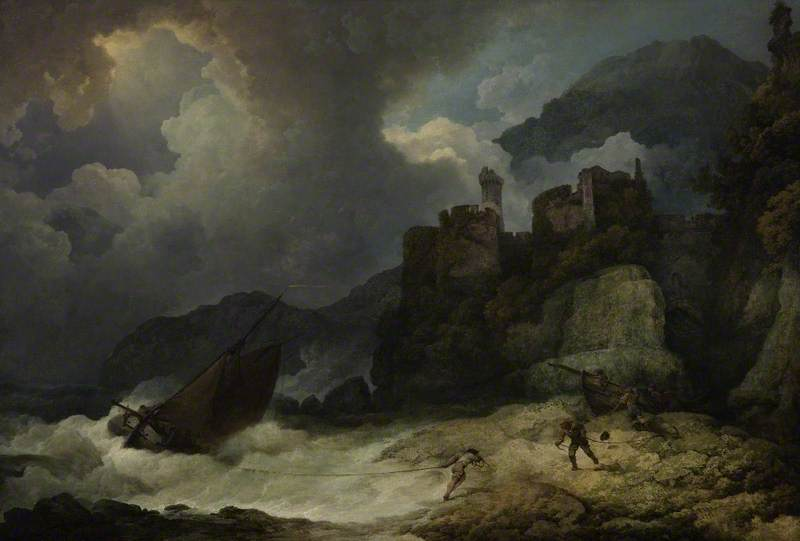
A Storm with Smuggler's Landing by Philip James de Loutherbourg

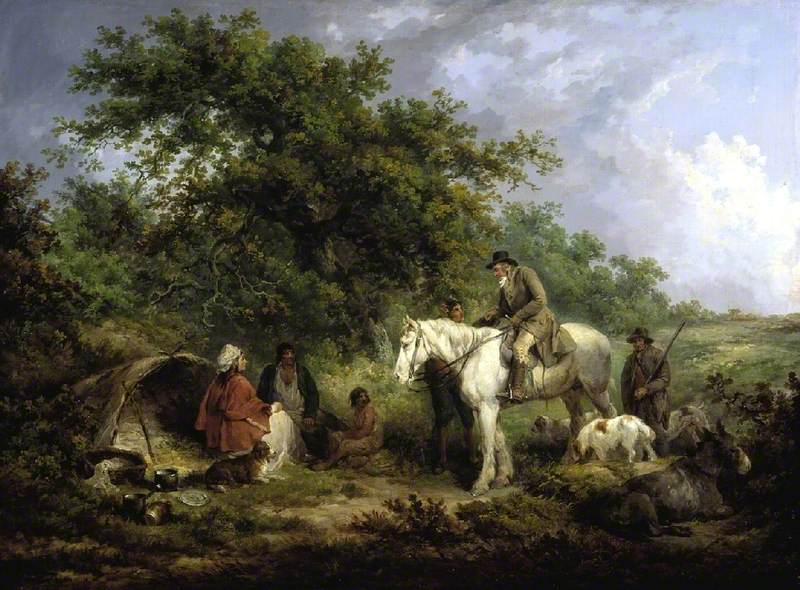
The Benevolent Sportsman by George Morland

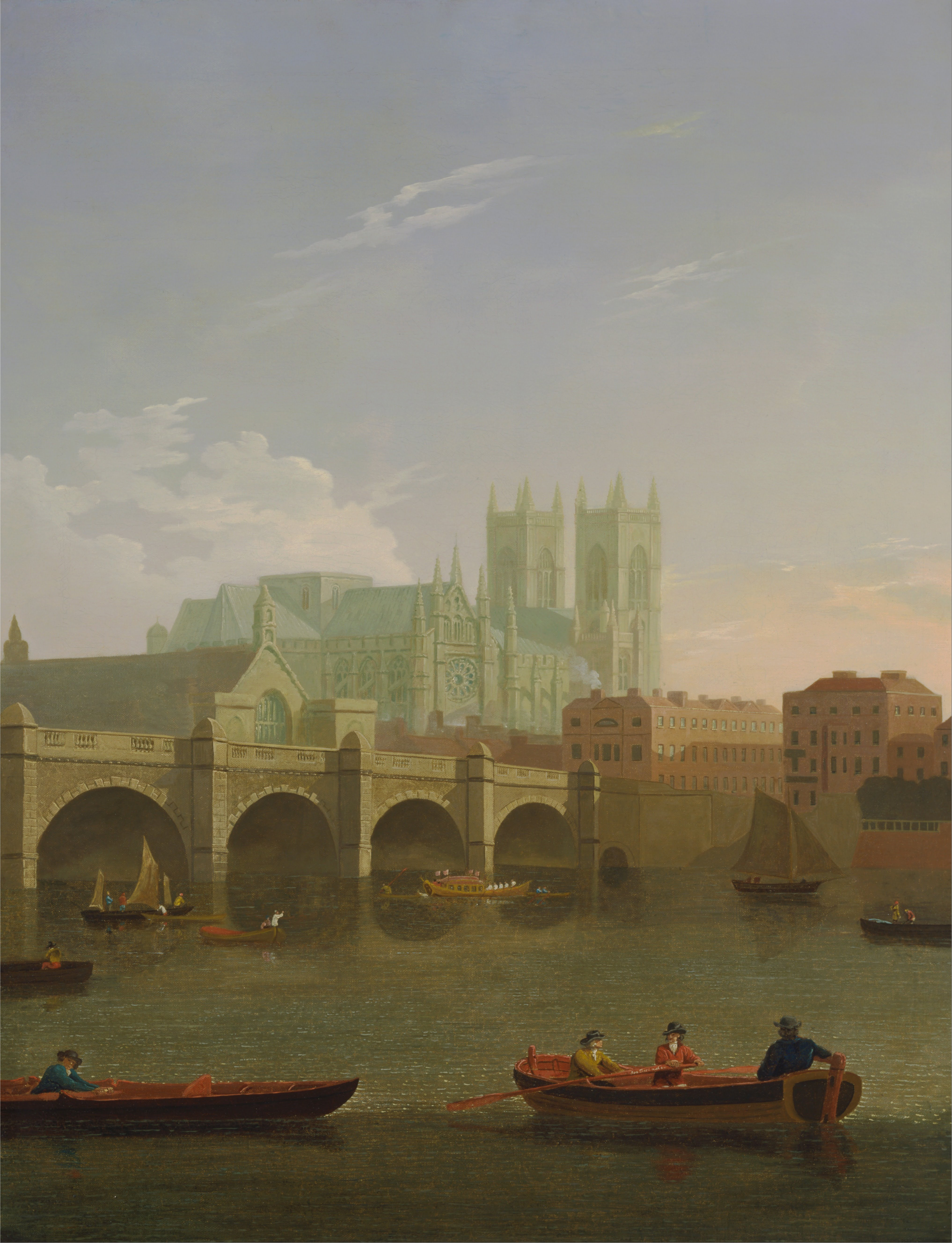
Westminster Abbey and Bridge by Joseph Farington

Milk Below Maids by Francis Wheatley

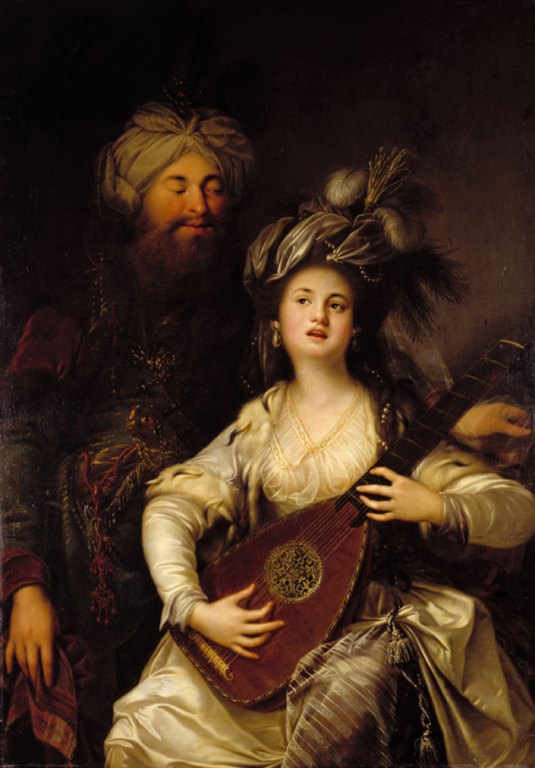
The Sultan by Anton Hickel

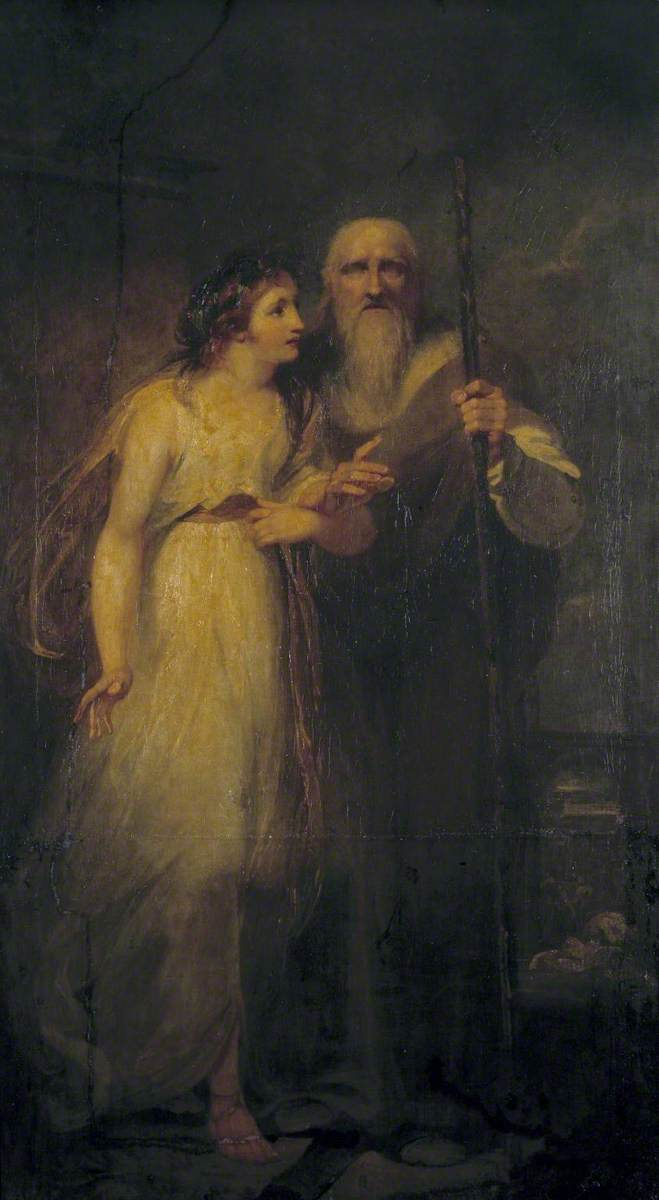
Manto and Tiresias by Henry Singleton

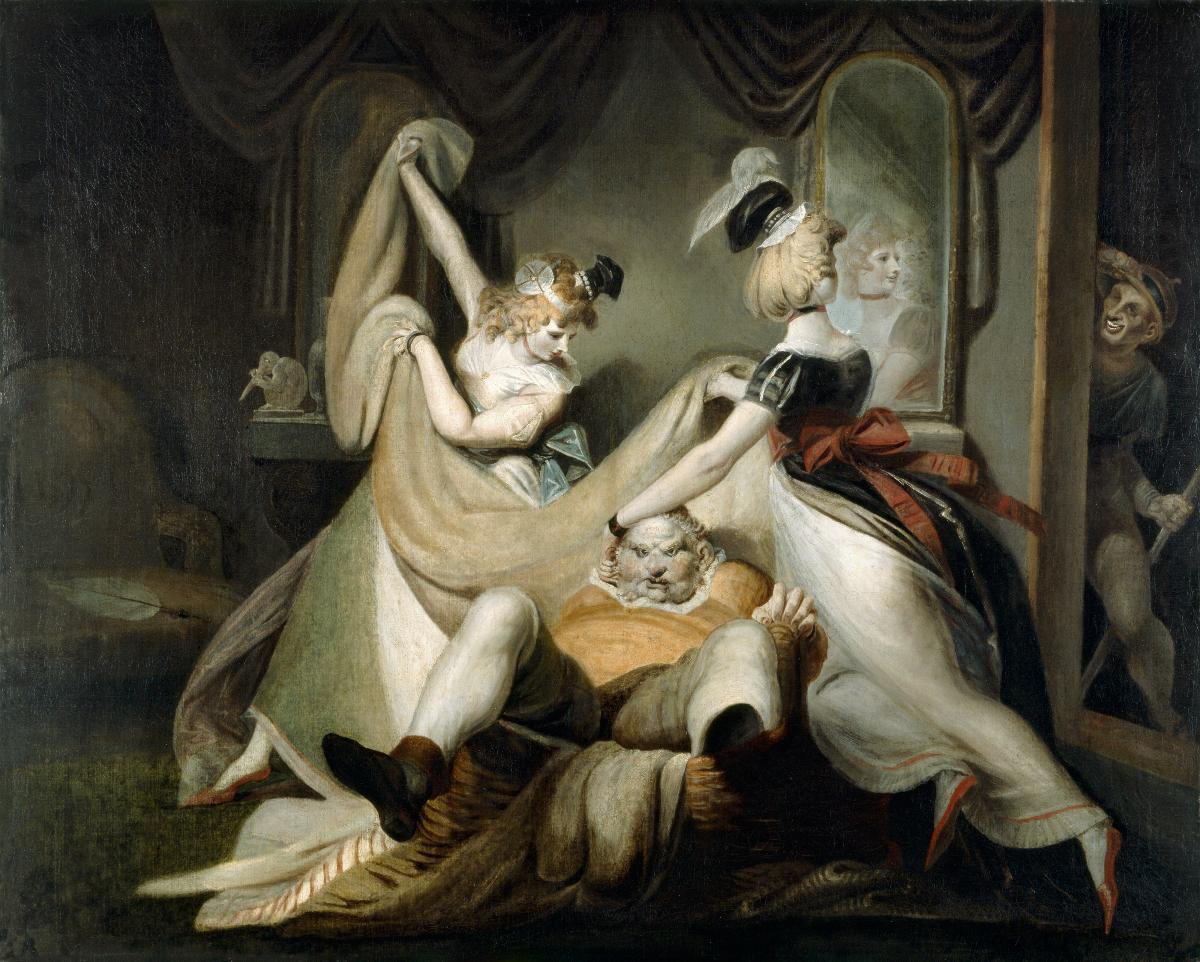
Falstaff in the Laundry Basket by Henry Fuseli

A View on the Banks of the Tiber at Rome by Francis Towne

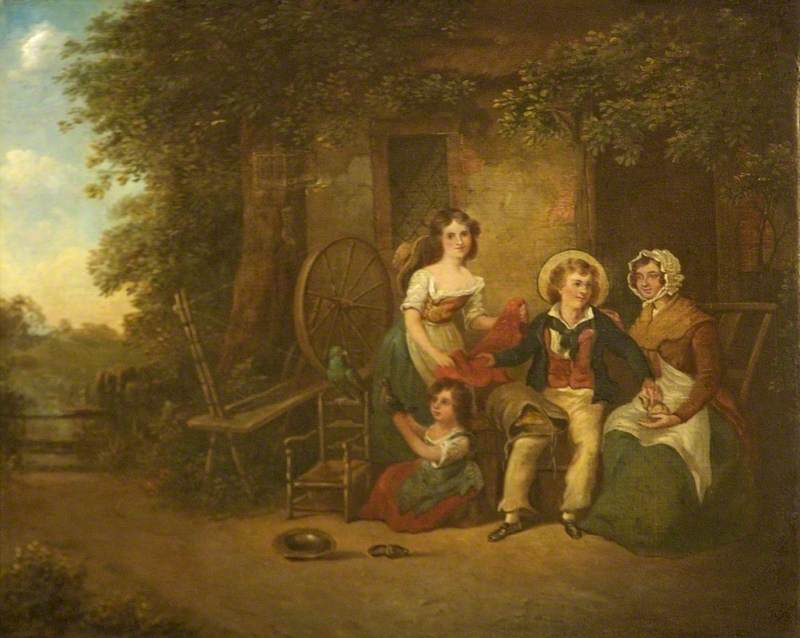
The Sailor Boy's Return from a Prosperous Voyage by William Redmore Bigg

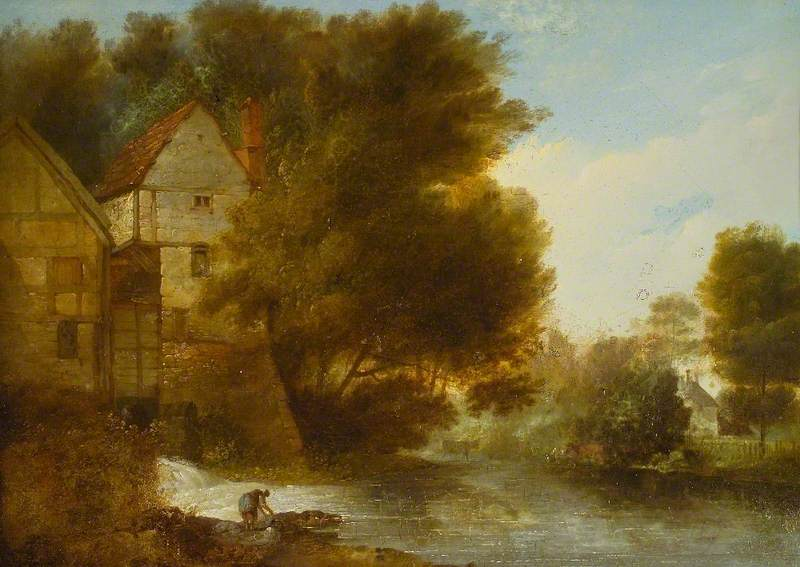
The Abbey Mill, Shrewsbury by John Webber

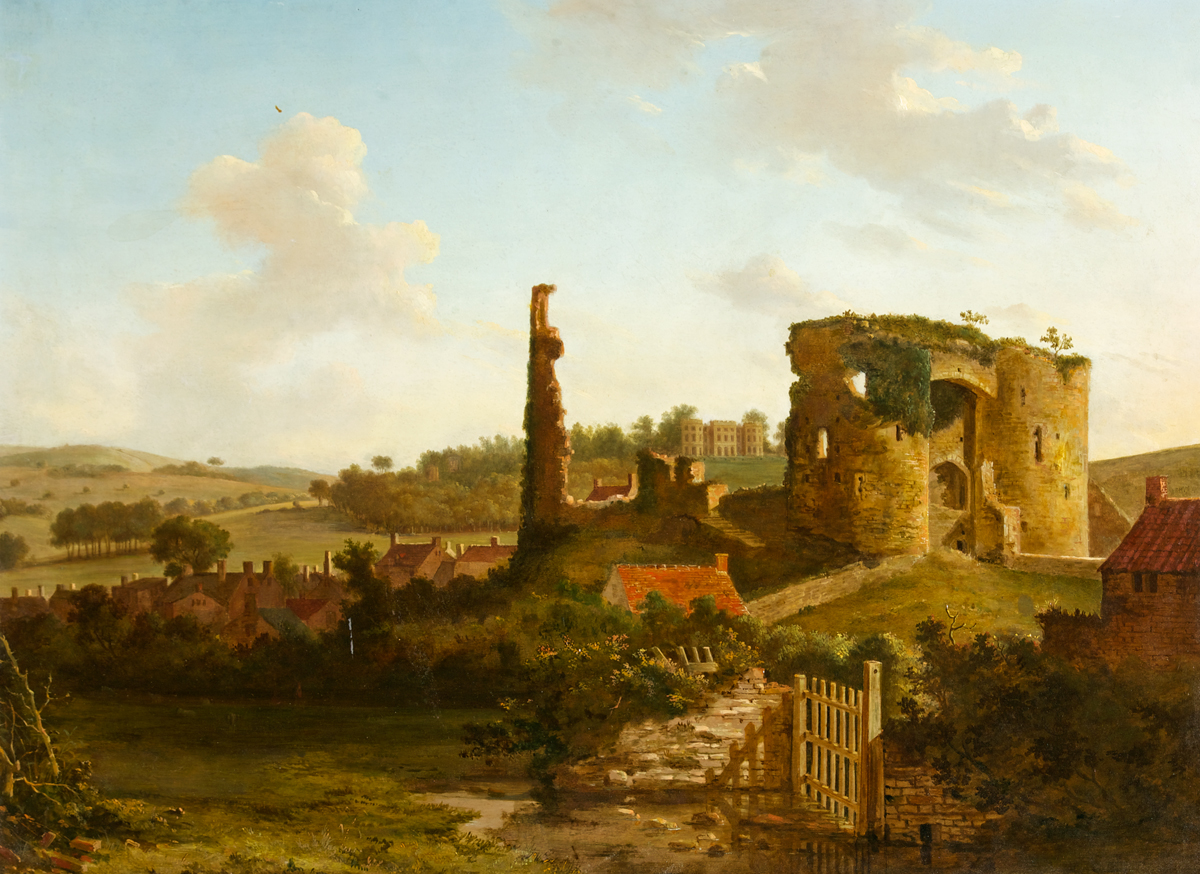
The Gnoll and Castle, Neath by Hendrik Frans de Cort

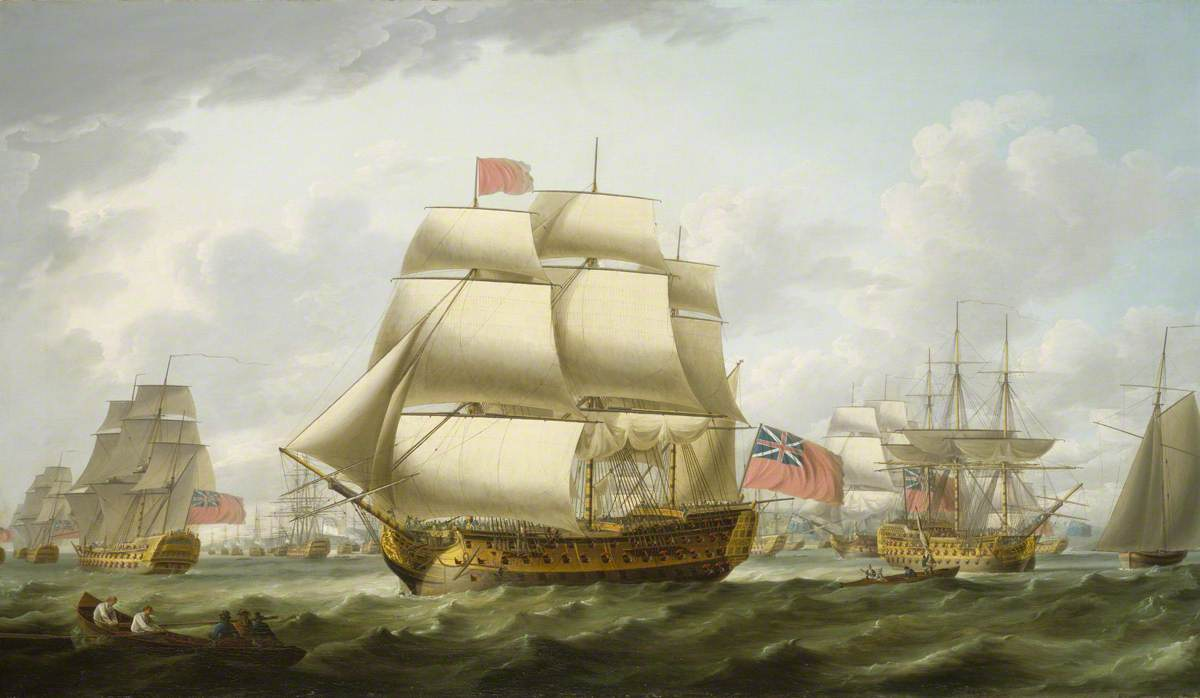
The Victory Sailing from Spithead by Robert Dodd

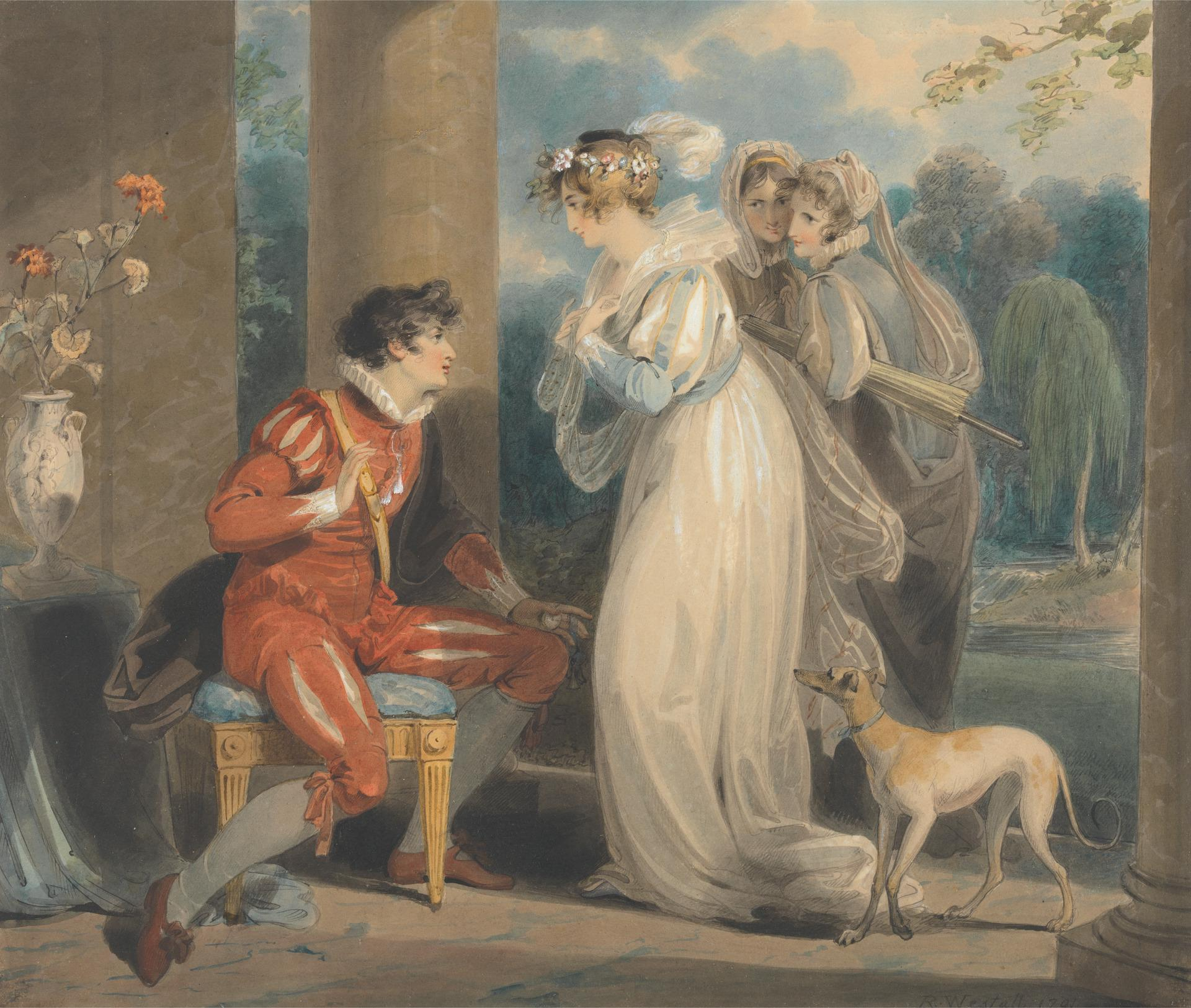
Rosebud, a watercolour by Richard Westall

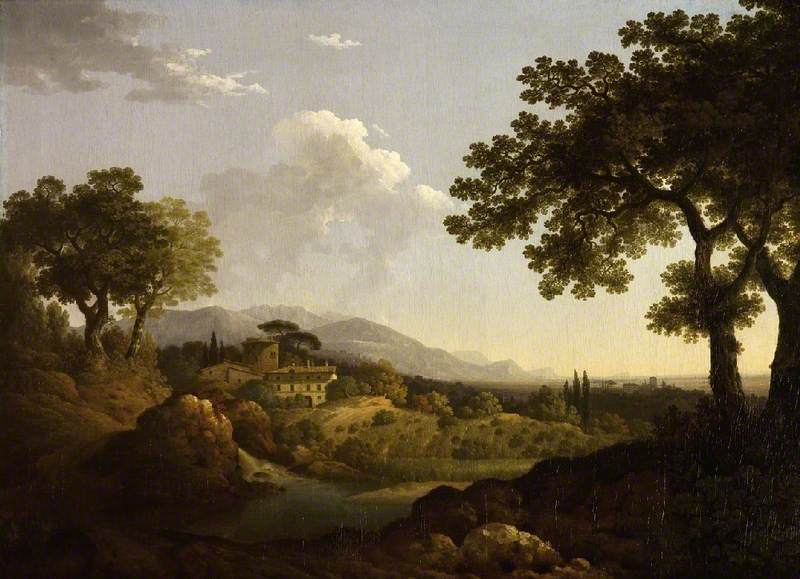
View near Naples by William Marlow

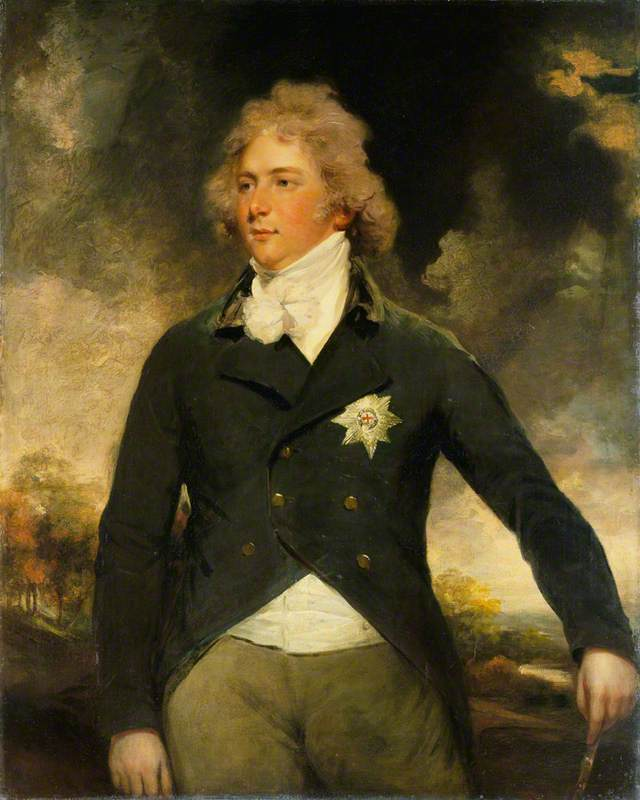
George, Prince of Wales by John Hoppner

Frederick, Duke of York by John Hoppner

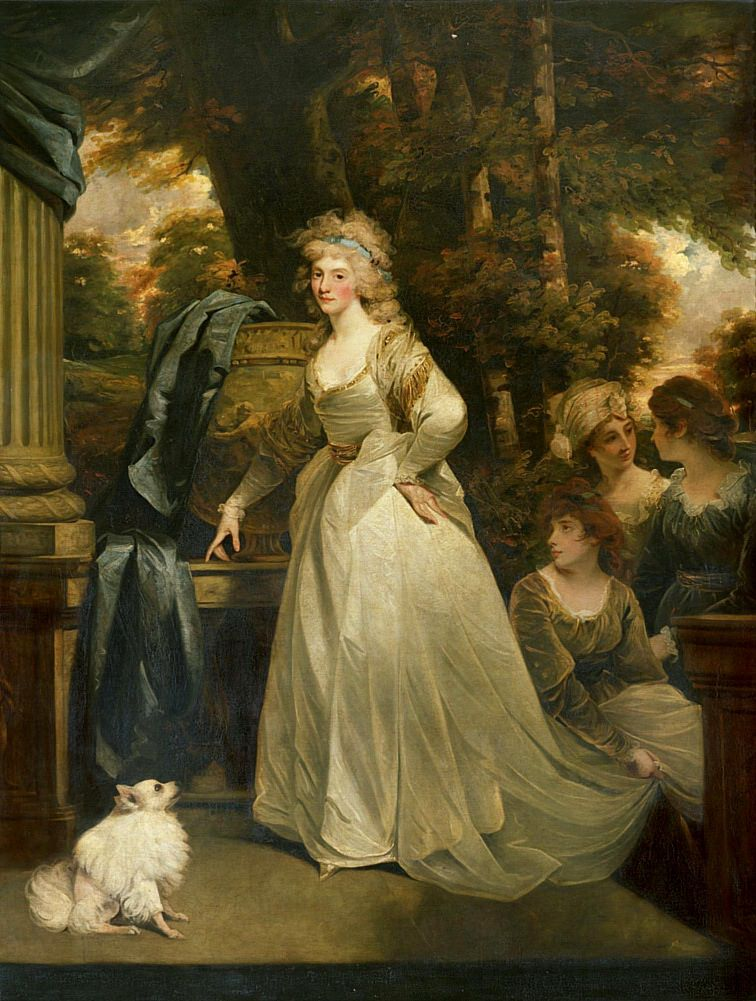
Duchess of York by John Hoppner

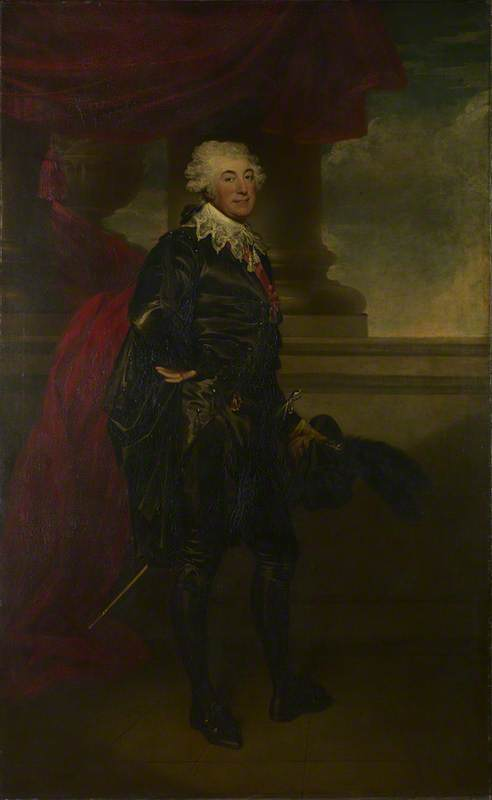
William Thomas Lewis in The Midnight Hour by Martin Archer Shee

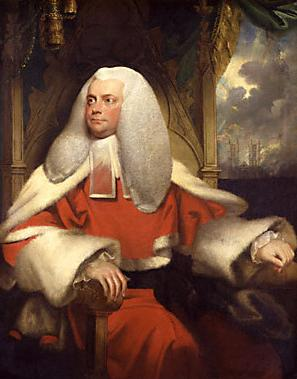
Portrait of Sir Francis Buller by Mather Brown

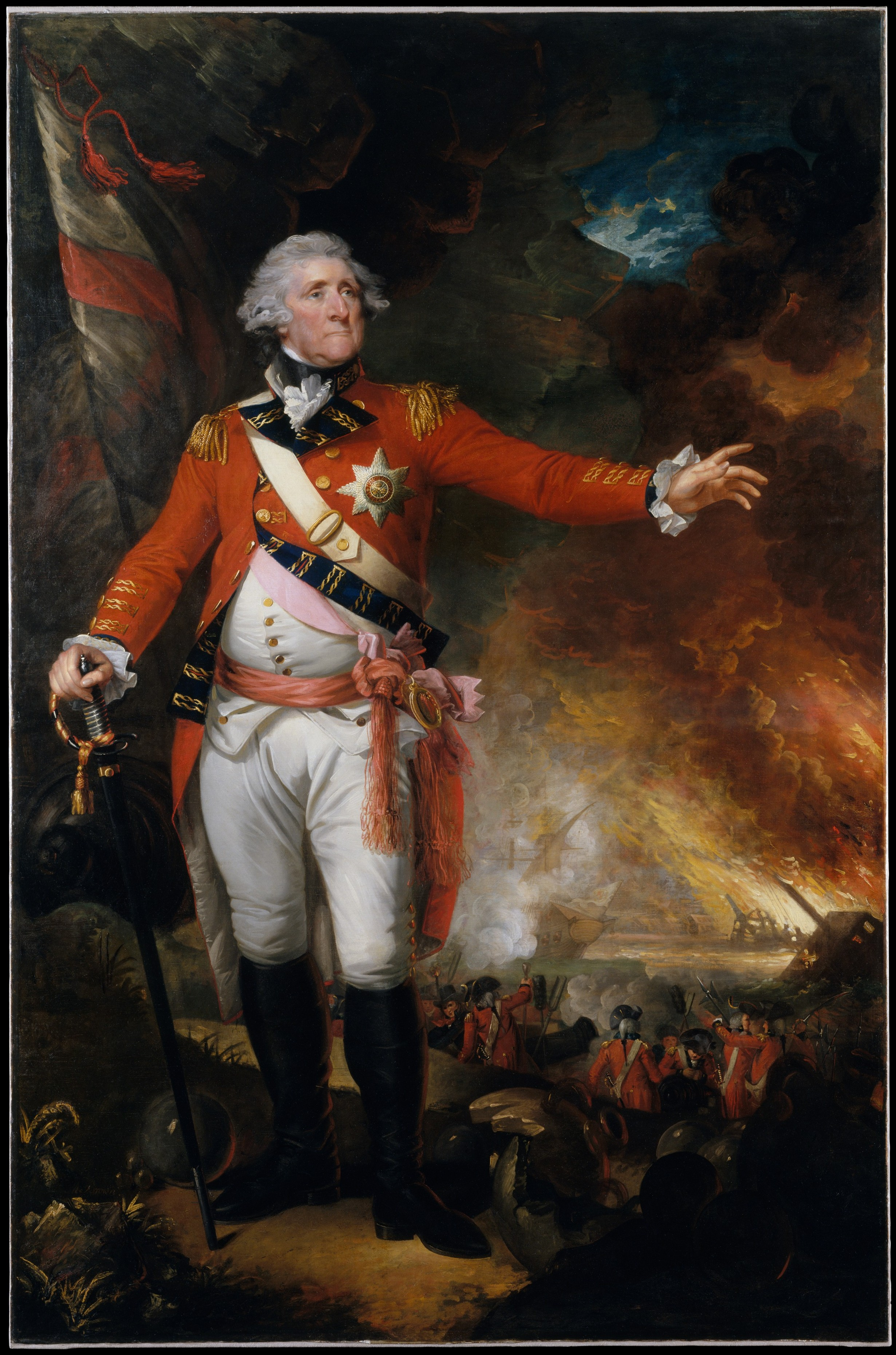
Portrait of Lord Heathfield by Mather Brown

== Bibliography ==
- Levey, Michael. Sir Thomas Lawrence. Yale University Press, 2005.
- McIntyre, Ian. Joshua Reynolds: The Life and Times of the First President of the Royal Academy. Allen Lane, 2003.
- Solkin, David H. (ed.) Art on the Line: The Royal Academy Exhibitions at Somerset House, 1780-1836. Courthald Gallery, 2001.
- Wright, Amina. Thomas Lawrence: Coming of Age. Bloomsbury Publishing, 2020.
