= Portrait of Arthur Atherley =

1791–92 painting by Thomas Lawrence

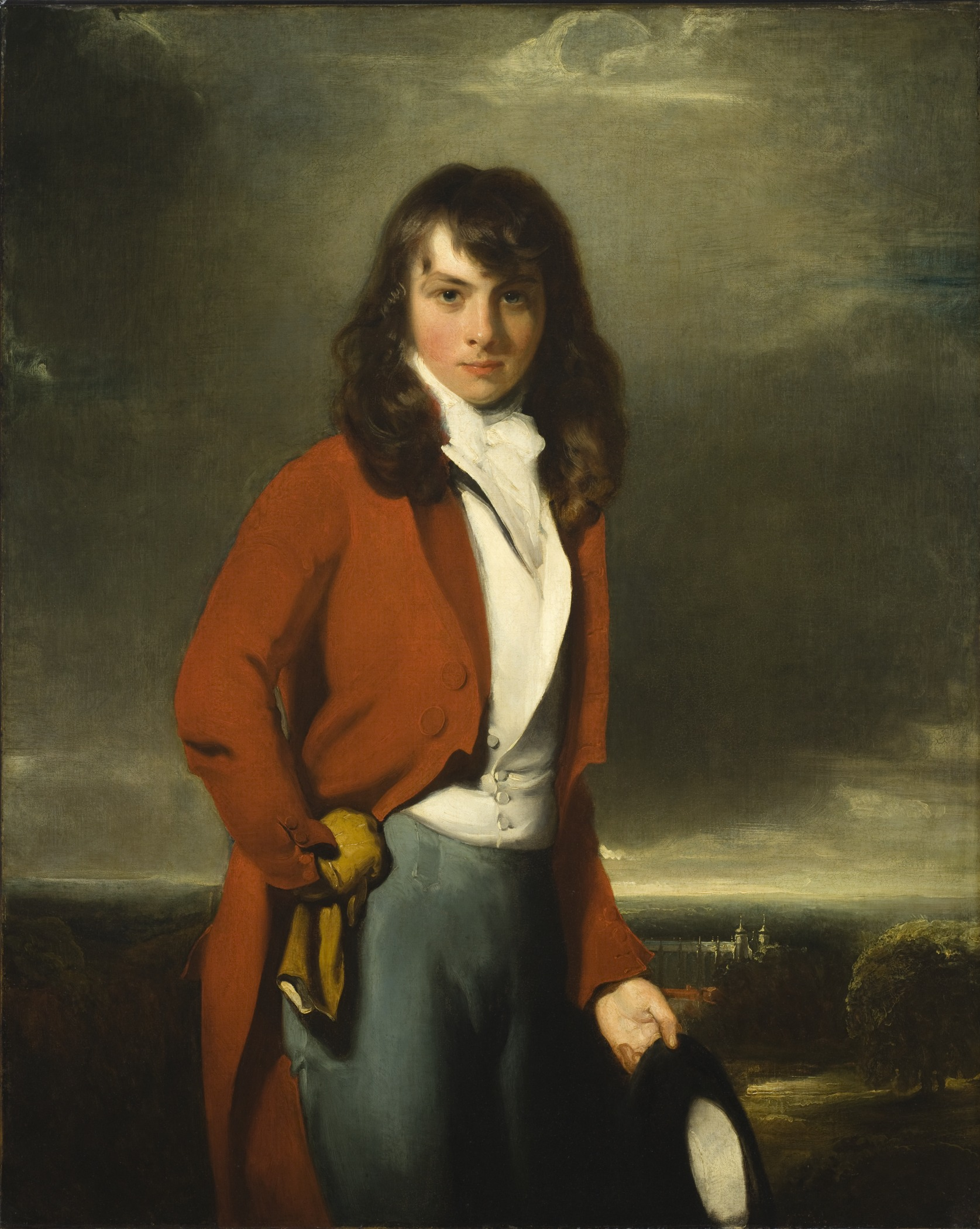
- Artist: Thomas Lawrence
- Year: 1791–92
- Type: Oil on canvas, portrait
- Dimensions: 126 cm × 100 cm (49.5 in × 39.5 in)
- Location: Los Angeles County Museum of Art, Los Angeles

Portrait of Arthur Atherley is an oil on canvas portrait painting by the British artist Thomas Lawrence, from 1791–1792. It depicts a young Englishman, Arthur Atherley, who had recently attended Eton College. It is also known as Arthur Atherley as an Etonian.

Atherley was around twenty when the painting was done. He is shown as an Old Etonian. Behind him can be seen the building of Eton College Chapel. Richard Holmes suggests "the exuberant colour scheme, piercing gaze and restless posture suggest a spirited young man in a state of change and formation". Atherley went on to serve as the Whig Member of Parliament for Southampton for many years without attaining high office.

The painting was prominently displayed the Royal Academy's Summer Exhibition of 1792. Today it is in the collection of the Los Angeles County Museum of Art.

== Bibliography ==
- Holmes, Richard. Thomas Lawrence Portraits. National Portrait Gallery, 2010.
- Levey, Michael. Sir Thomas Lawrence. Yale University Press, 2005.
- Wright, Amina. Thomas Lawrence: Coming of Age. Bloomsbury Publishing, 2020.
