= Eton College Chapel =

Ancient chapel attached to Eton College

Coordinates: 51.4916°N 0.6087°W

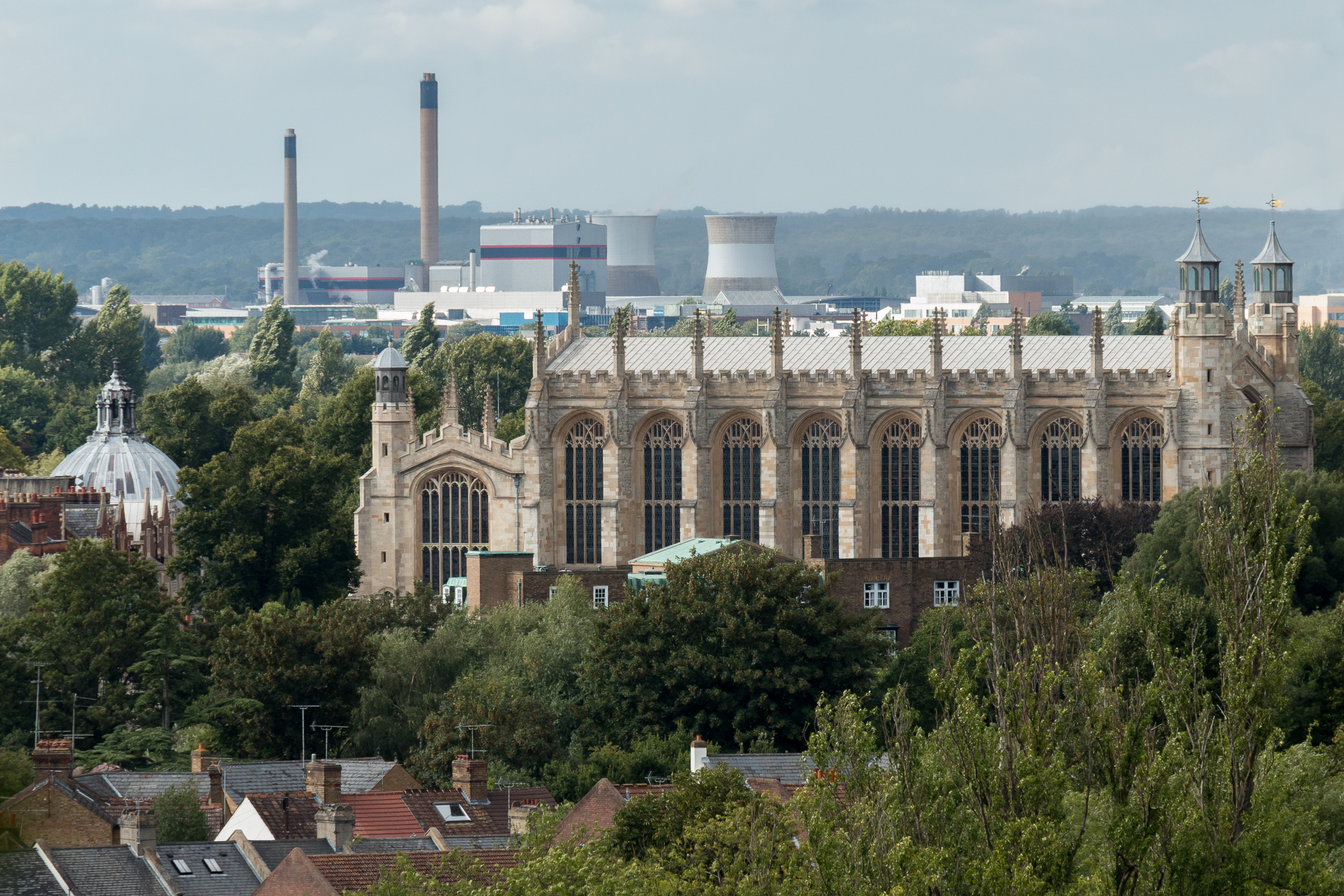
- Eton College Chapel as seen from Windsor Castle

Religion
- Affiliation: Christianity

Location
- Interactive map of Eton College Chapel

Eton College Chapel is the main chapel of Eton College, a public school in England.

The chapel was planned to be a little over double its actual length, but this plan was never completed owing to the downfall of the founder Henry VI. A plaque on a building opposite the west end marks the point to which it should have reached. The chapel is built in the late Gothic or Perpendicular style.

The fan vaulting was installed in the 1950s after the wooden roof became infested with deathwatch beetles. It was completed in three years and is made of concrete, faced with stone, and supported by steel trusses with hand-carved Clipsham stone for the stone ribs supporting each bay.

== Services ==
Eton College Chapel is in frequent use, with at least one service a day during termtime, and many additional services which are in popular demand, ranging from Taizé to Roman Catholic Communion, to Compline. Almost every morning there is a compulsory service, attended by different 'Blocks' (school years) depending on the day, something which has been both criticised and defended by boys in The Chronicle (the school magazine). These last no more than twenty minutes.

== Founder ==
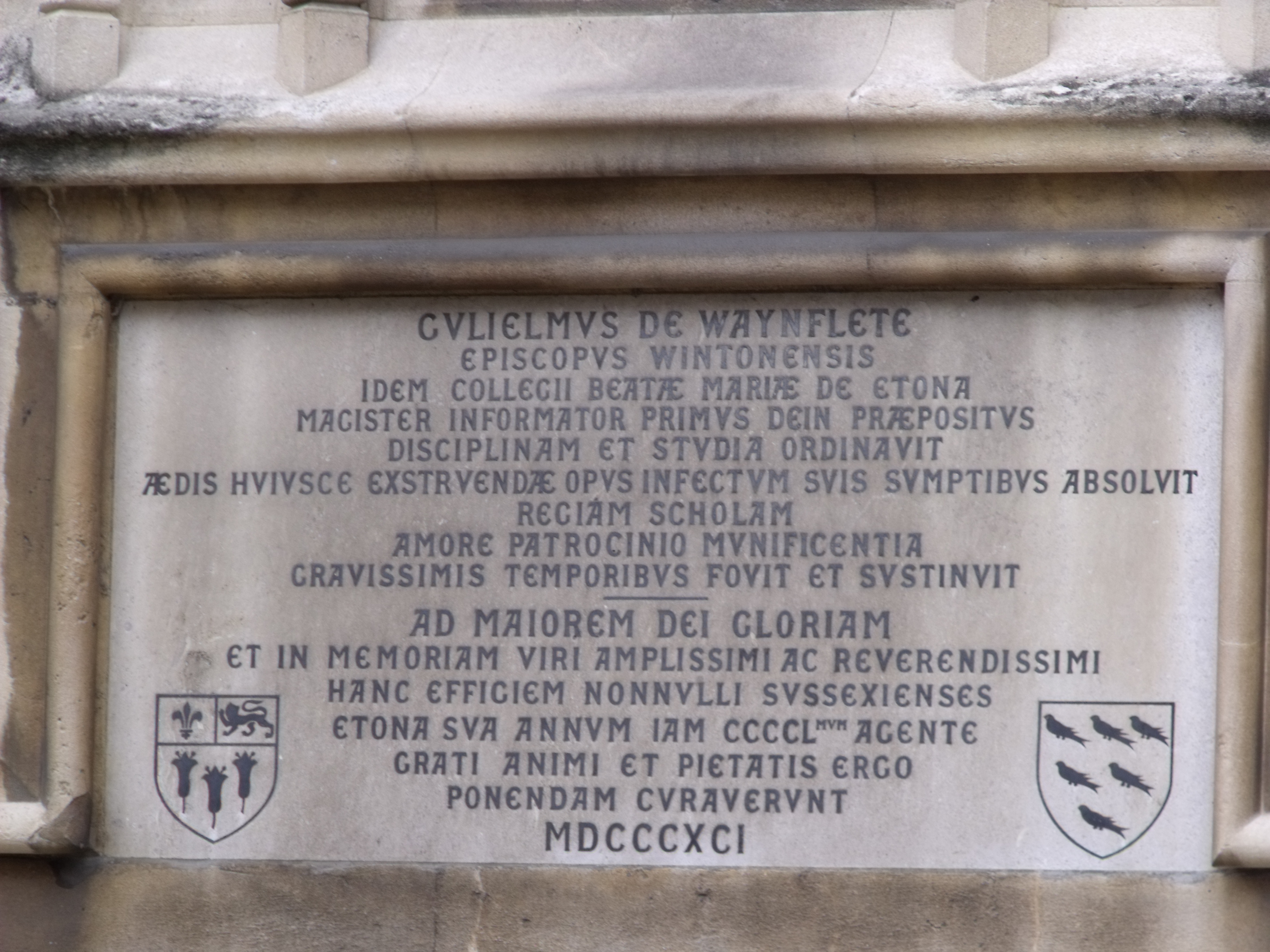
Latin commemorative plaque to William Waynflete at Eton College, erected in 1891

Henry VI attached the greatest importance to the religious aspects of his new foundation and he planned that the services would be conducted on a magnificent scale by providing an establishment of 10 fellow priests, 10 chaplains, 10 clerks and 16 choristers. There were to be 14 services a day, plus prayers that were said. There would also be masses offered for the Founder's parents and after his death for the Founder instead. This last custom is consistent with the Catholic practice of praying for a dead person's soul in order to hasten its progress from Purgatory to Paradise.

This was befitting for a church that was to become a great place of pilgrimage in Europe: for about a decade pilgrims attracted by the relics and the available Indulgences flocked to Eton on the Feast of the Assumption in August, when there was a fair lasting six days on the fields.

For around forty years before the chapel was completed, services were held in the parish church, which was dedicated to the Assumption of the Virgin. In the 1460s, the annual influx of pilgrims died out, and the large establishment of clergy was permanently reduced in size.

The chapel services remain a key part of the life of the college: boys attend Chapel once on Sundays in addition to compulsory services three or four days a week, and the numerous optional services that take place out of school hours.

A second chapel, Lower Chapel, was built in 1890 to accommodate the growing number of boys at the school.

== The choir ==
The chapel choir is made up of boys from the school. The Precentor and Director of Music is Tim Johnson. Up to 75% of the choir are former members of various cathedral and collegiate choirs and many have been admitted under the school's Music Scholarship scheme. Many continue their singing careers as choral scholars at Oxford, Cambridge or Durham. Formerly there was a "professional" choir whose trebles attended the Choir School.

The choir sings at three or four compulsory services a week: recent cuts in the services mean that the choir only sings on Fridays, Saturdays and Sundays. There are a number of other services that are optional.

== Acoustics and lighting ==
The chapel is unique amongst its comparably-sized peers in that it eschews sound boards (a common feature of English churches and chapels in which medium-to-large-scale services and concerts are heard) in favour of what the former Precentor, Ralph Allwood, calls a more "organic" sound produced without the use of equipment (apart from microphones in the pulpit and lectern).

The audio reinforcement system in the chapel, installed by DRV Integration, was the winner of the AV Magazine audio project of the year award in 2003.

== Wall paintings ==
The wall paintings in the chapel are considered to be the most remarkable work of art in the college. They are the work of at least four master painters, including William Baker, who took eight years to complete them (1479–87). In the Flemish style, they adorn the sides of the chapel. On the north side the paintings depict the Virgin Mary (to whom the chapel is dedicated), while those on the South side tell a popular medieval story about a mythical empress. These paintings were whitewashed over in 1560 as a result of an order from the new Protestant church authorities which banned depictions of mythical miracles. They were left obscured and forgotten for around 300 years, until they were rediscovered in 1847; in 1923 they were cleaned, restored and revealed by the removal of the stall canopies.

== Chapel windows ==
In World War II, all of the chapel glass, except a window above the organ, was shattered by a bomb that fell on the nearby Upper School. The replacement East Window is the work of Evie Hone. The designs for the windows on either side are by John Piper and were executed in glass by Patrick Reyntiens. The subjects are divided into four miracles on the north side and four parables on the south side. The miracles are: the Miraculous Draft of Fishes, the Feeding of the Five Thousand, the Stilling of the Waters, and the Raising of Lazarus. The parables are: the Light under a Bushel, the House built on the Rock, the Lost Sheep, and the Sower.

== Burials ==
- Richard Allestree
- Richard Wellesley, 1st Marquess Wellesley
- Henry Wotton

== List of Conducts ==
The Conduct (meaning "hired priest") is the senior chaplain of Eton College and has specific responsibility for the College Chapel. They preside over its daily services and any occasional offices (weddings, baptisms, etc.).

- The Revd Henry Harper (1831 to 1856); later Bishop of Christchurch and Primate of New Zealand
- The Revd Ralph Sadleir (1964 to 1970)
- The Revd David Jones (1970 to 1974)
- The Revd Roger Royle (1974 to 1979)
- The Revd James Bentley TD (1979 to 1982)
- The Revd Paul Bibby (1982 to 1987)
- The Revd John Witheridge (1987 to 1996)
- The Revd Charles Mitchell-Innes (1996 to 2007)
- The Revd Canon Keith Wilkinson (2008 to 2016)
- The Revd Stephen Gray (From 2016)

== Gallery ==
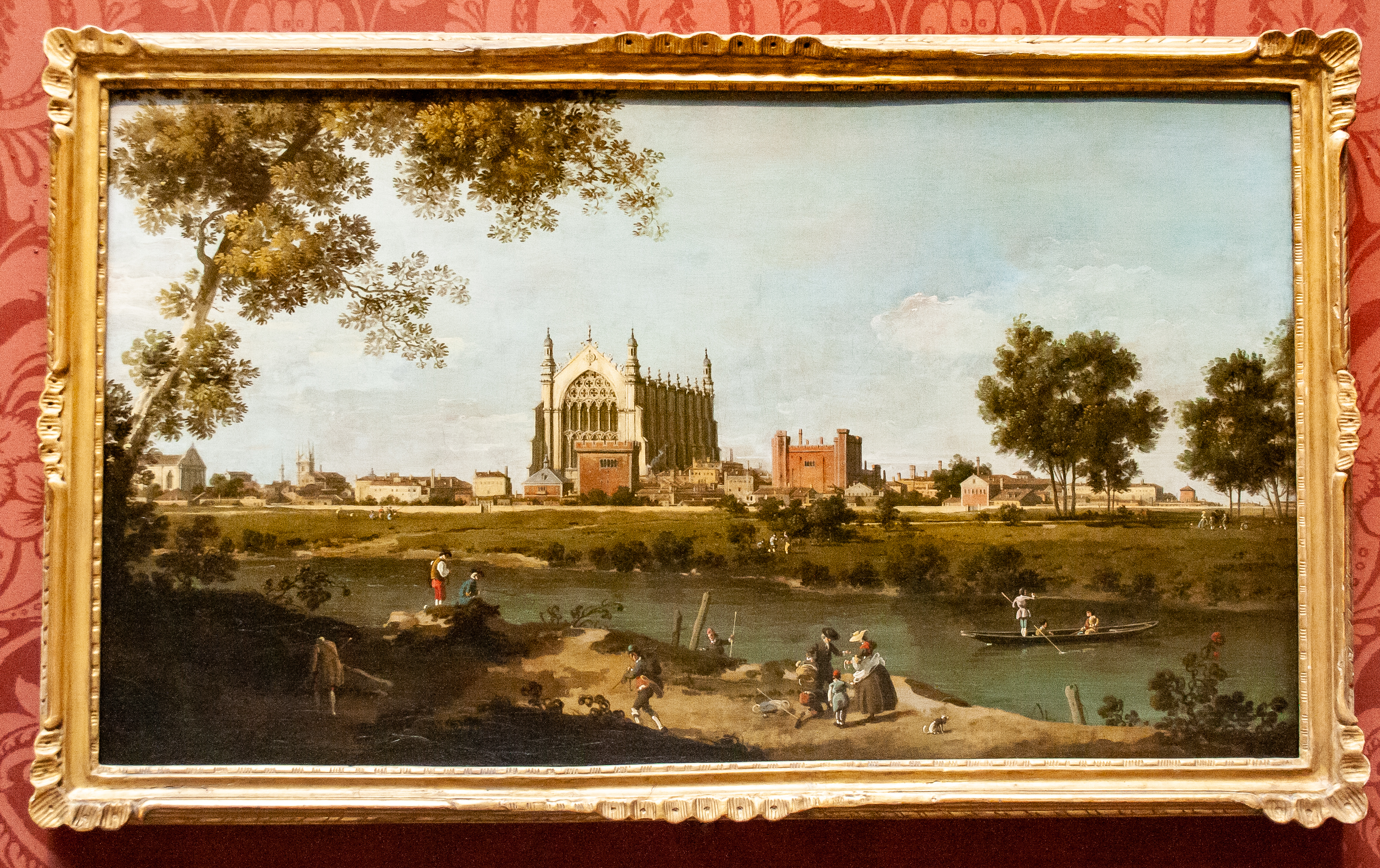
Eton College Chapel from the River Thames, oil on canvas by Canaletto, c. 1754

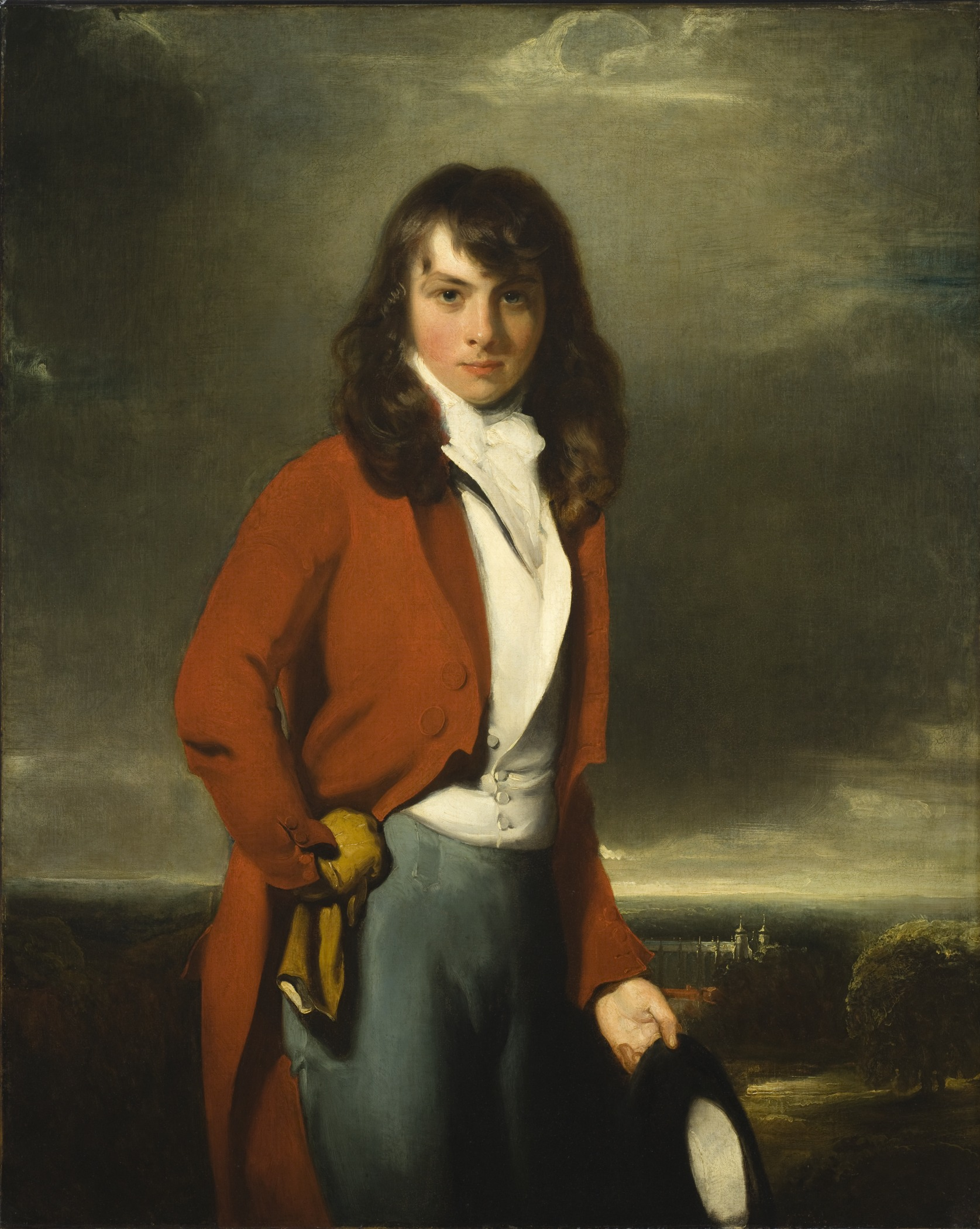
Portrait of Arthur Atherley by Thomas Lawrence, 1792. Atherley is depicted as an Etonian with the chapel clearly visible in the background.

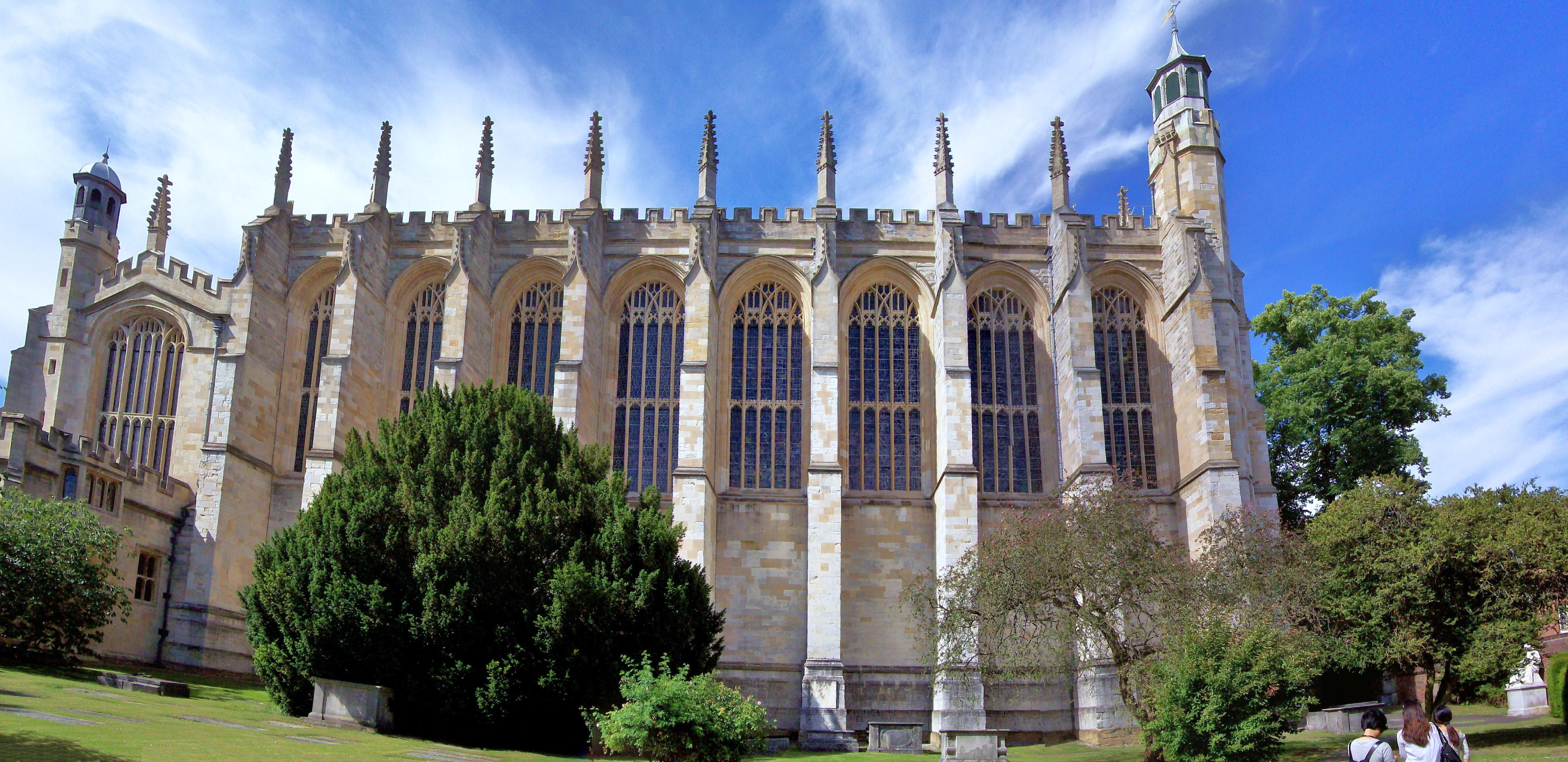
The exterior of the chapel

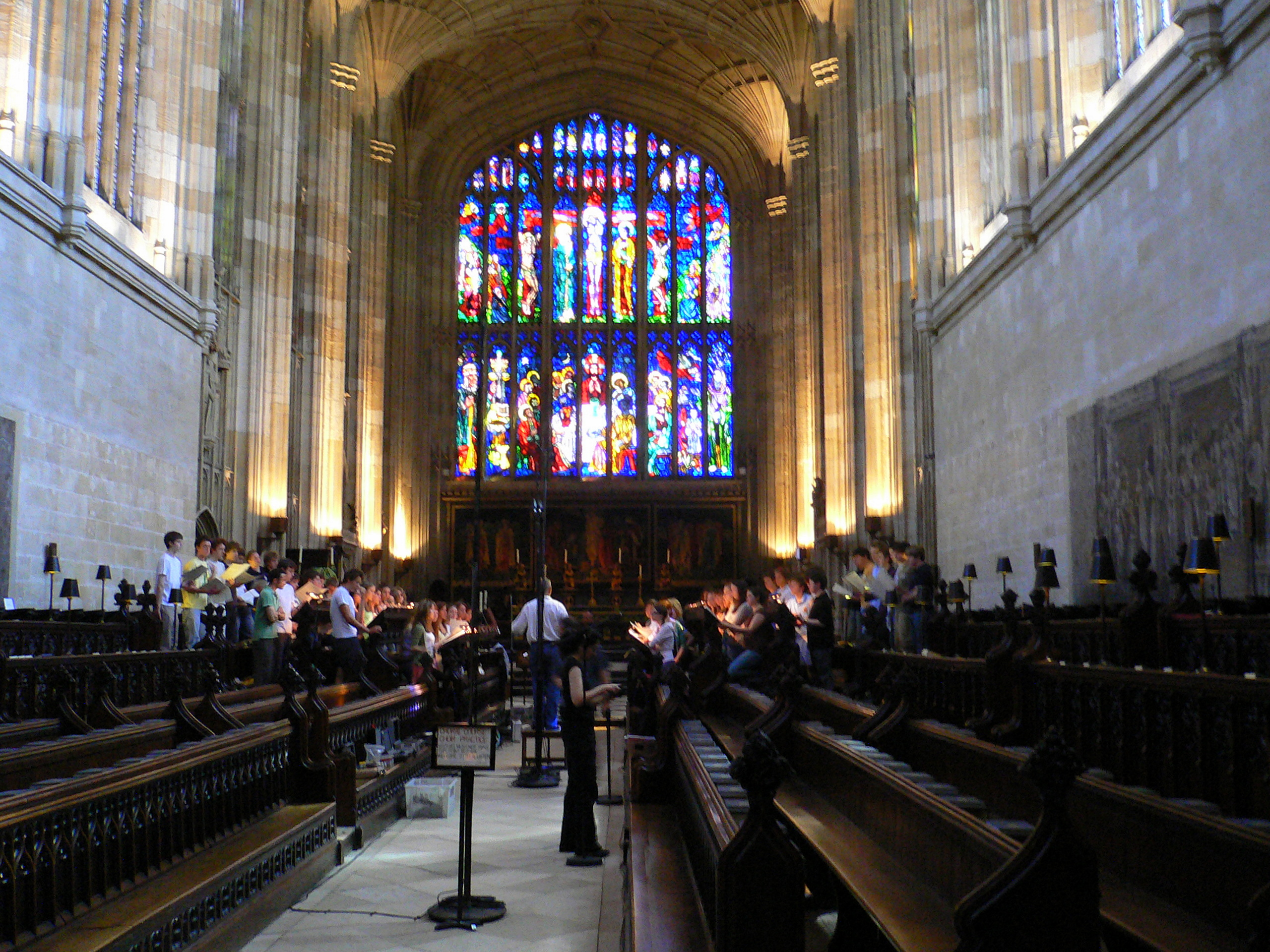
The interior of the chapel

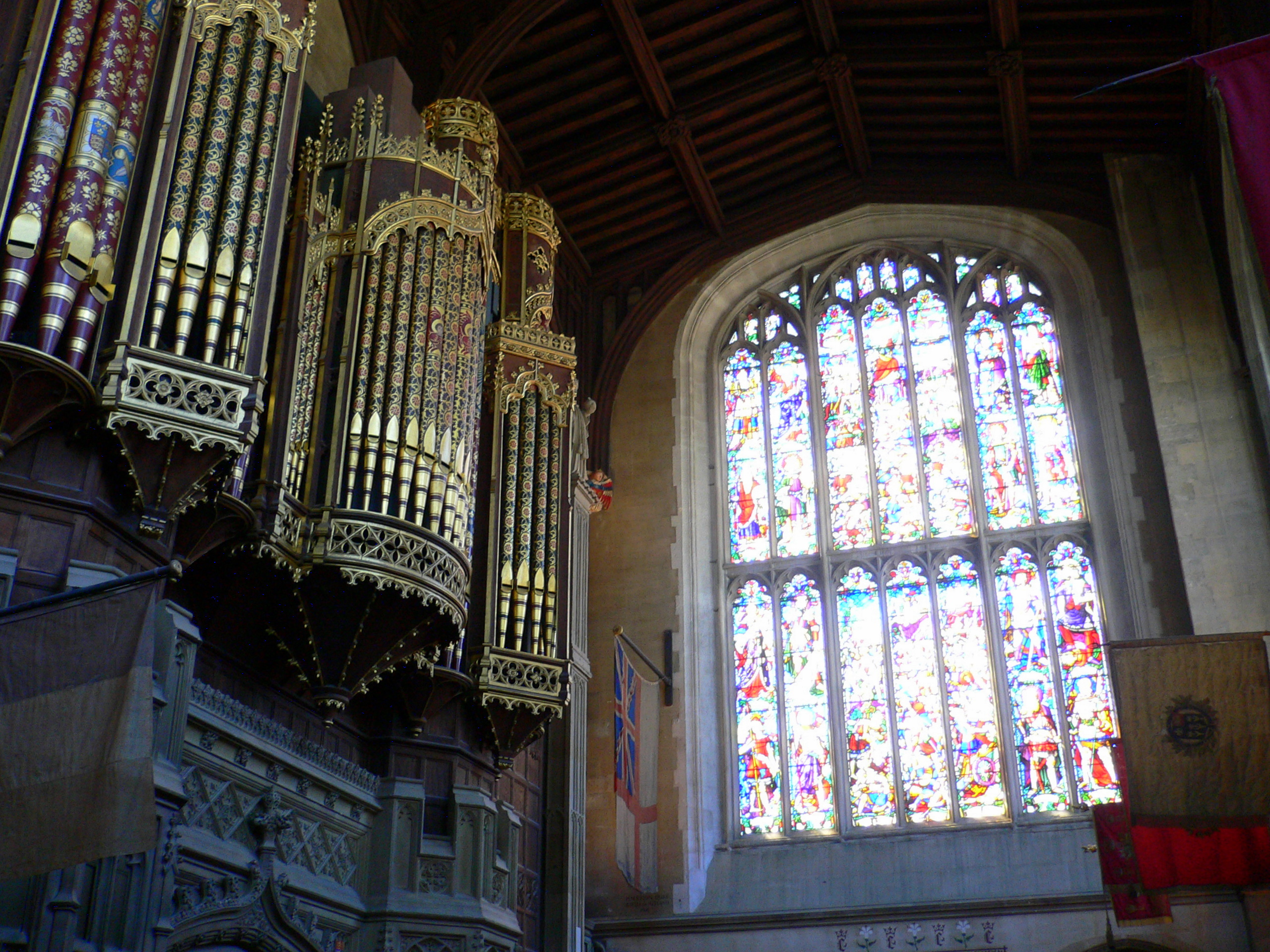
The chapel organ

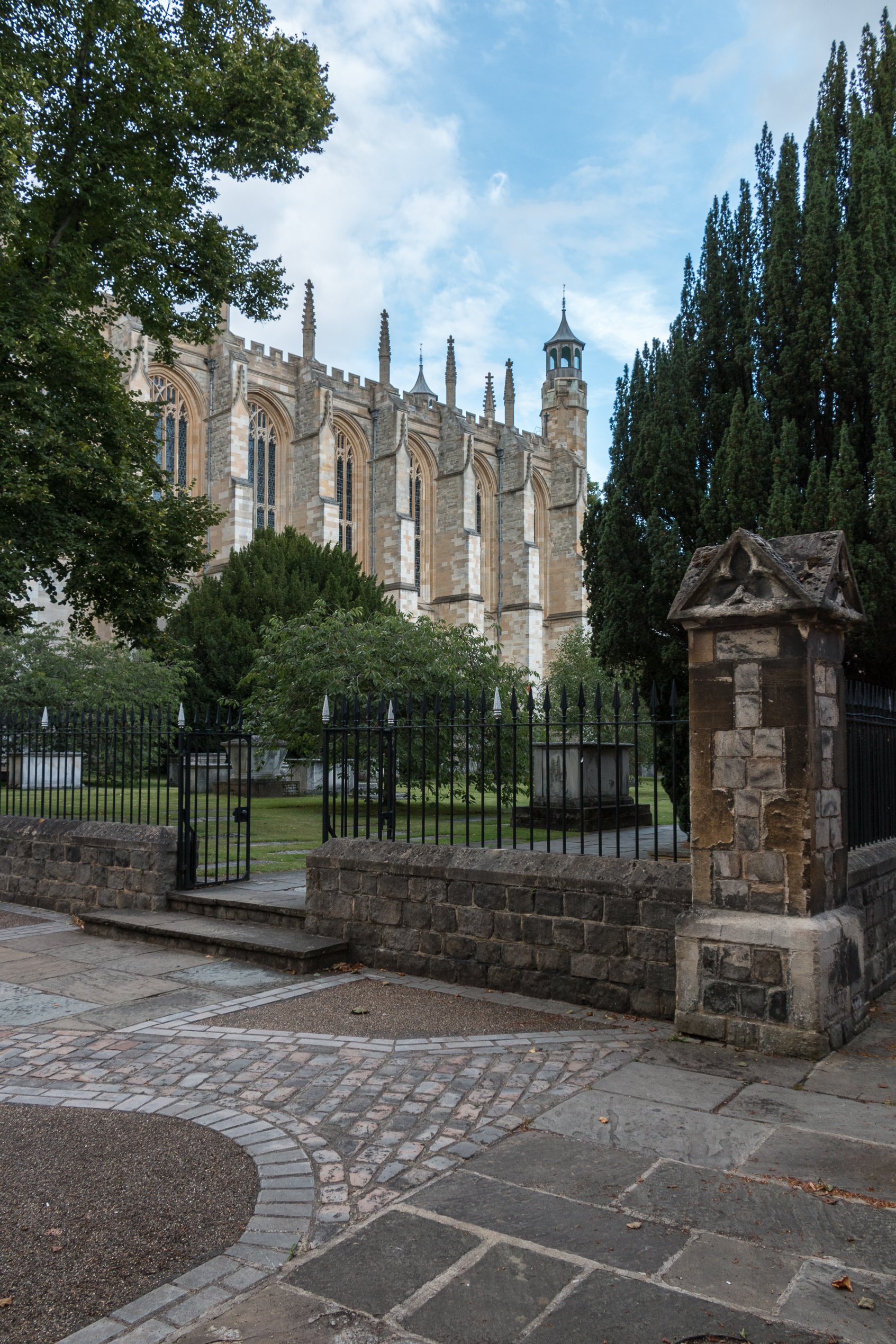
The churchyard next to the chapel

== See also ==
- English Gothic architecture
- Eton College Collections
- Eton fives
- King's College Chapel, Cambridge
- King's College, Cambridge
- Syon Abbey
