= Alexander Hamilton (Trumbull) =

Painting by John Trumbull

- Artist: John Trumbull
- Year: 1792
- Subject: Alexander Hamilton
- Dimensions: 219.1 cm × 146.1 cm (86.3 in × 57.5 in)
- Location: Metropolitan Museum of Art, New York City; Crystal Bridges Museum of American Art, Bentonville, Arkansas

Alexander Hamilton is a 1792 full-length portrait of Alexander Hamilton by John Trumbull. It is one of multiple paintings John Trumbull made of Alexander Hamilton.

In 2013, the painting was donated by Credit Suisse to both New York's Metropolitan Museum of Art and the Crystal Bridges Museum of American Art in Bentonville, Arkansas. According to The Met, the work is considered the "greatest known portrait of Hamilton and one of the finest civic portraits from the Federal period".
