= Gardens of Versailles =

Gardens of the former royal residence of Versailles, France

- Jardins du château de Versailles
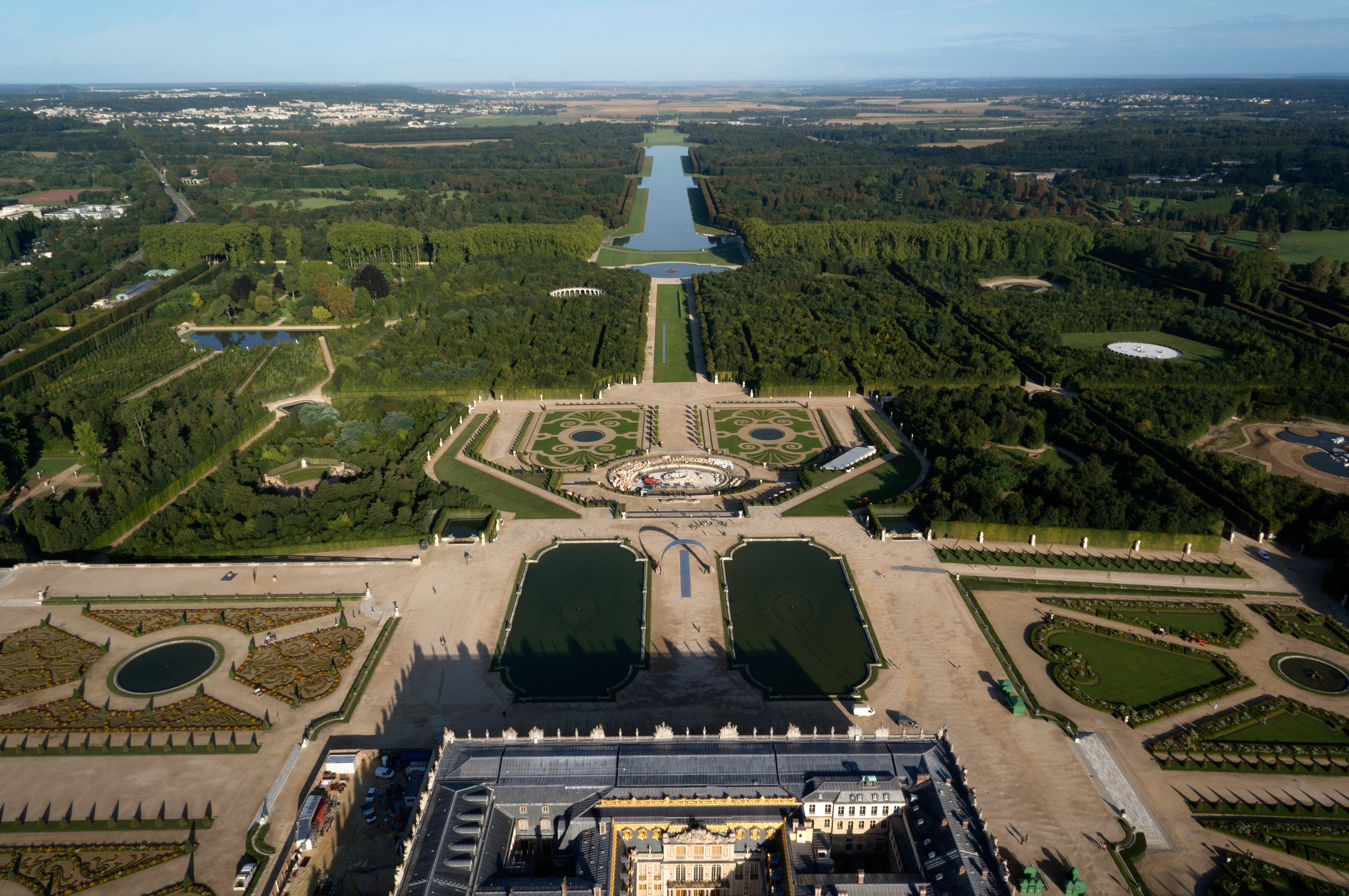
- Aerial view of the gardens from above the palace
- Interactive map of Gardens of Versailles
- Type: French Formal Gardens
- Location: Versailles, France
- Nearest city: Trianon
- Coordinates: 48°48′29″N 2°6′30″E
- Area: 800 ha (2,000 acres)
- Created: 1630s
- Founder: Louis XIII
- Designer: André Le Nôtre; Charles Le Brun; Louis Le Vau; Jules Hardouin-Mansart
- Administrator: Public Establishment of the Palace, Museum and National Estate of Versailles, French Ministry of Culture
- Visitors: 6 million (in 2009)
- Awards: UNESCO World Heritage site
- Camp sites: No
- Hiking trails: Yes
- Paths: Yes
- Water: Grand Canal; others
- Plants: 200,000 trees; 210,000 flowers planted annually
- Features: 55 fountains; 620 water jets (fed by 35 km (22 mi) piping); 5.57 km (3.46 mi) Grand Canal (circumference; surface area 23 ha (57 acres)); 2100 sculptures

The Gardens of Versailles (French: Jardins du château de Versailles [ʒaʁdɛ̃ dy ʃɑto d(ə) vɛʁsɑj]) occupy part of what was once the Domaine royal de Versailles, the royal demesne of the château of Versailles. Situated to the west of the palace, the gardens cover some 800 ha (2,000 acres) of land, much of which is landscaped in the classic French formal garden style perfected here by André Le Nôtre. Beyond the surrounding belt of woodland, the gardens are bordered by the urban areas of Versailles to the east and Le Chesnay to the north-east, by the National Arboretum de Chèvreloup to the north, the Versailles plain (a protected wildlife preserve) to the west, and by the Satory Forest to the south.

Administered by the Public Establishment of the Palace, Museum and National Estate of Versailles, an autonomous public entity operating under the aegis of the French Ministry of Culture, the gardens are now one of the most visited public sites in France, receiving more than six million visitors a year.

In addition to the meticulous manicured lawns, parterres, and sculptures are the fountains, which are located throughout the garden. Dating from the time of Louis XIV and still using much of the same network of hydraulics as was used during the Ancien Régime, the fountains contribute to making the gardens of Versailles unique. On weekends from late spring to early autumn, the administration of the museum sponsors the Grandes Eaux – spectacles during which all the fountains in the gardens are in full play. Designed by André Le Nôtre, the Grand Canal is the masterpiece of the Gardens of Versailles. In the Gardens too, the Grand Trianon was built to provide the Sun King with the retreat he wanted. The Petit Trianon is associated with Marie Antoinette, who spent her time there with her closest relatives and friends.

In 1979, the gardens along with the château were inscribed on the UNESCO World Heritage List for their cultural importance during the 17th and 18th centuries.

== Planning diagram ==
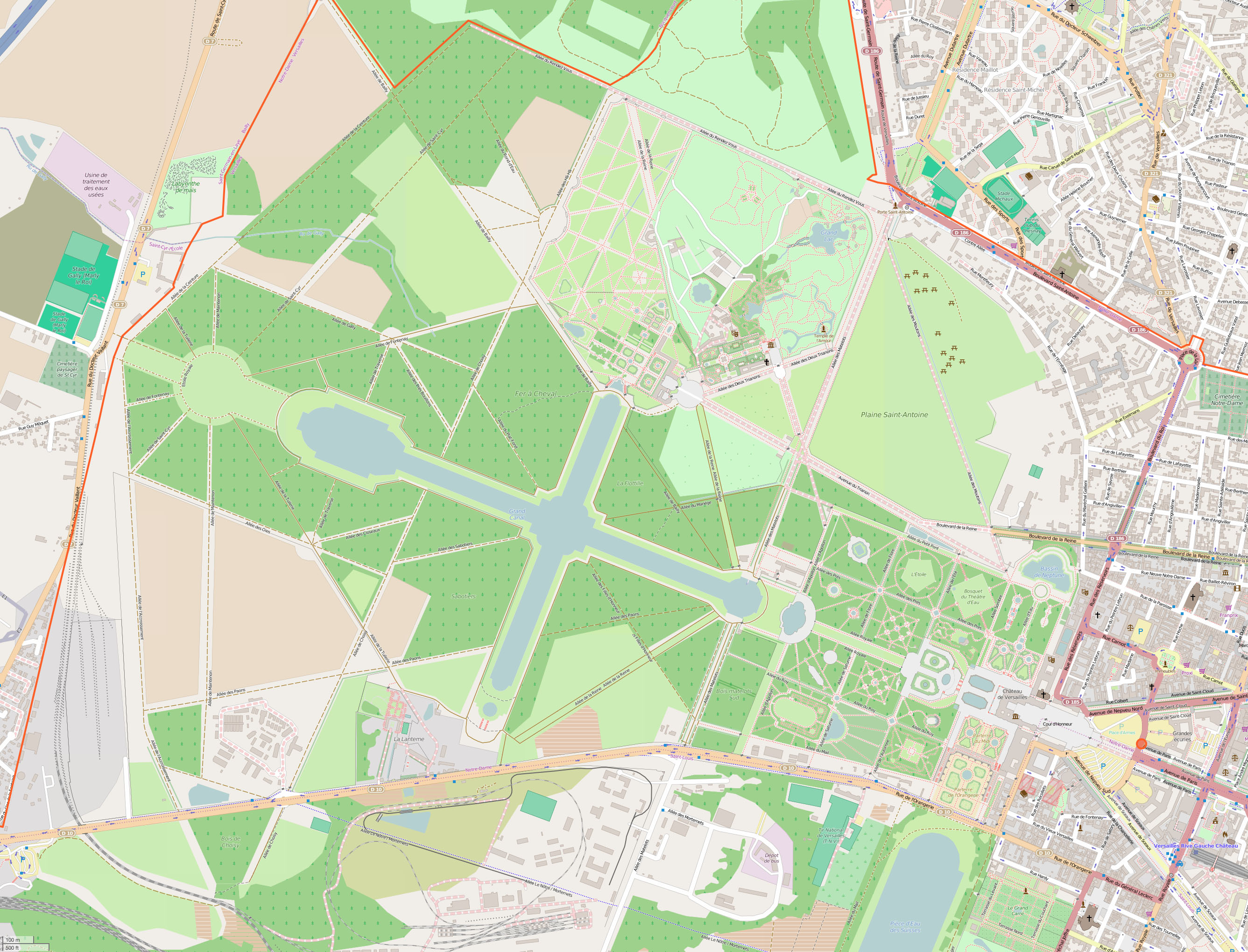
Plan of the gardens of Versailles

== Louis XIII ==
Versailles, Du Bus plan

With Louis XIII's final purchase of lands from Jean-François de Gondi in 1632 and his assumption of the seigneurial role of Versailles in the 1630s, formal gardens were laid out west of the château. Records indicate that late in the decade Claude Mollet and Hilaire Masson designed the gardens, which remained relatively unchanged until the expansion ordered under Louis XIV in the 1660s. This early layout, which has survived in the so-called Du Bus plan of c. 1662, shows an established topography along which lines of the gardens evolved. This is evidenced in the clear definition of the main east–west and north–south axis that anchors the gardens' layout.

== Louis XIV ==
In 1661, after the disgrace of the finance minister Nicolas Fouquet, who was accused by rivals of embezzling crown funds in order to build his luxurious château at Vaux-le-Vicomte, Louis XIV turned his attention to Versailles. With the aid of Fouquet's architect Louis Le Vau, painter Charles Le Brun, and landscape architect André Le Nôtre, Louis began an embellishment and expansion program at Versailles that would occupy his time and worries for the remainder of his reign.

From this point forward, the expansion of the gardens of Versailles followed the expansions of the château. Accordingly, Louis XIV's building campaigns apply to the gardens as well. At every stage the prescribed tour was carefully managed, under the Sun King's directions.

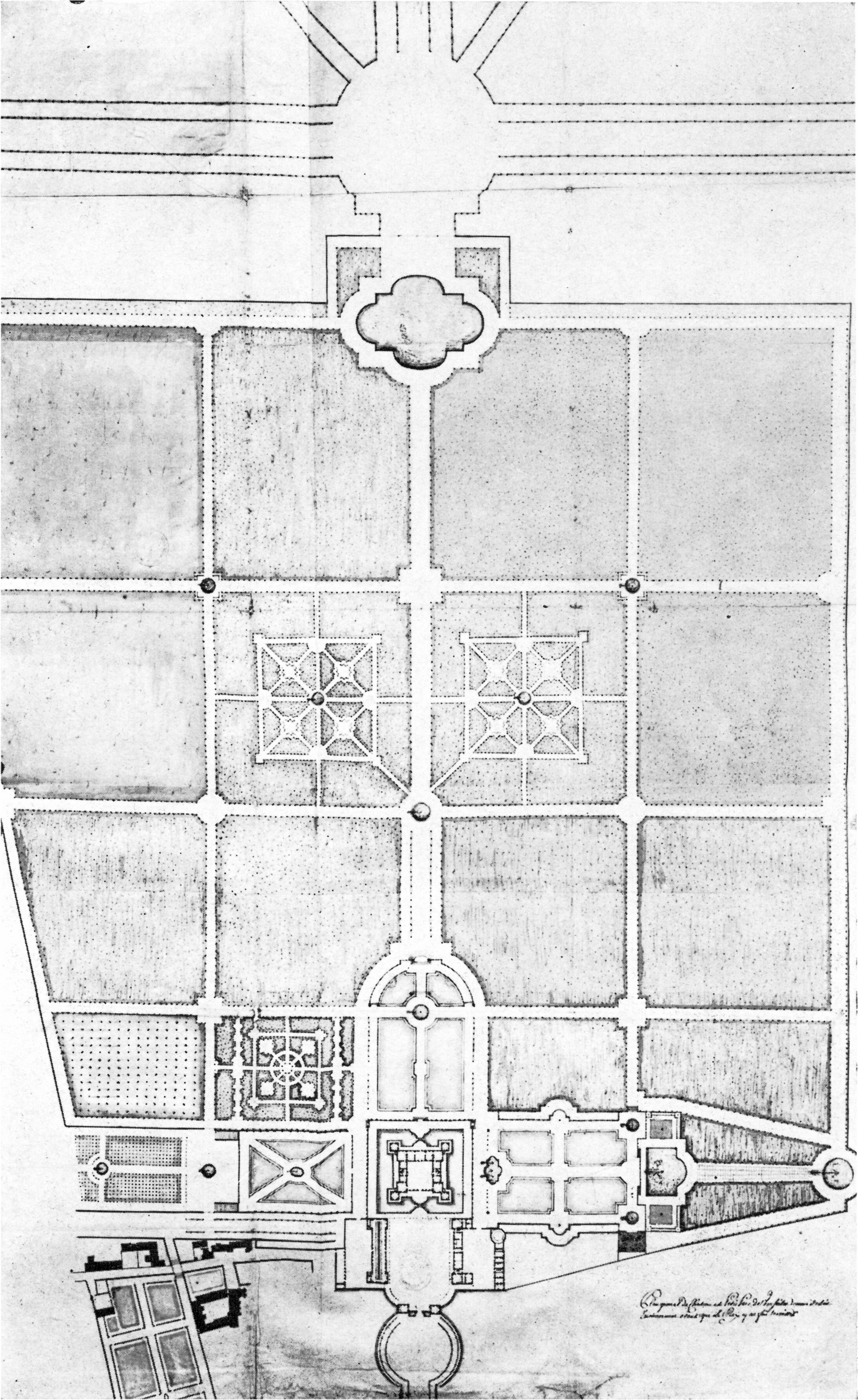
Garden plan, c. 1663

=== First building campaign ===
In 1662, minor modifications to the château were undertaken; however, greater attention was given to developing the gardens. Existing bosquets and parterres were expanded and new ones created. Most significant among the creations at this time were the Versailles Orangerie and the "Grotte de Thétys". (Nolhac 1901, 1925) The Orangery, which was designed by Louis Le Vau, was located south of the château, a situation that took advantage of the natural slope of the hill. It provided a protected area in which orange trees were kept during the winter months. (Nolhac 1899, 1902)

The "Grotte de Thétys", which was located to the north of the château, formed part of the iconography of the château and of the gardens that aligned Louis XIV with solar imagery. The grotto would be completed during the second building campaign. (Verlet 1985)

By 1664, the gardens had evolved to the point that Louis XIV inaugurated the gardens with the fête galante called Les Plaisirs de l’Île enchantée. The event, which officially was to celebrate his mother, Anne of Austria, and his consort Maria-Theresa but in reality celebrated Louise de La Vallière, Louis' mistress, was held in May of that year. Guests were regaled with fabulous entertainments in the gardens over a period of one week. As a result of this fête – particularly the lack of housing for guests (most of them had to sleep in their carriages), Louis realized the shortcomings of Versailles and began to expand the château and the gardens once again. (Verlet, 1961, 1985)

=== Second building campaign ===
Between 1664 and 1668, a flurry of activity was evidenced in the gardens – especially with regard to fountains and new bosquets; it was during this time that the imagery of the gardens consciously exploited Apollo and solar imagery as metaphors for Louis XIV. Le Vau's enveloppe of the Louis XIII's château provided a means by which, though the decoration of the garden façade, imagery in the decors of the grands appartements of the king and queen formed a symbiosis with the imagery of the gardens. (Lighthart, 1997; Mâle, 1927)

With this new phase of construction, the gardens assumed the topographical and iconological design vocabulary that would remain in force until the 18th century. As André Félibien noted in his description of Versailles, solar and apollonian themes predominated with projects constructed at the time: "Since the sun was the emblem of Louis XIV, and that poets join the sun and Apollo, there is nothing in this superb house that does not relation to this divinity." (Félibien, 1674).

Three additions formed the topological and symbolic nexus of the gardens during this phase of construction: the completion of the "Grotte de Thétys", the "Bassin de Latone", and the "Bassin d'Apollon".

==== Grotte de Thétys ====
Started in 1664 and finished in 1670 with the installation of the statuary by the Gilles Guérin, François Girardon, Thomas Regnaudin, Gaspard Marsy, and Balthazar Marsy, the grotto formed an important symbolic and technical component to the gardens. Symbolically, the "Grotte de Thétys" related to the myth of Apollo – and by that association to Louis XIV. It was as the cave of the sea nymph Thetis, where Apollo rested after driving his chariot to light the sky. The grotto was a freestanding structure located just north of the château. The interior, which was decorated with shell-work to represent a sea cave, contained the statue group by the Marsy brothers depicting the sun god attended by nereids (central grouping) and his horses being groomed by attendants of Thetis (the two accompanying statue groups). Originally, these statues were set in three individual niches in the grotto and were surrounded by various fountains and water features.

Technically, the "'Grotte de Thétys" played a critical role in the hydraulic system that supplied water to the garden. The roof of the grotto supported a reservoir that stored water pumped from the Clagny pond and which fed the fountains lower in the garden via gravity.

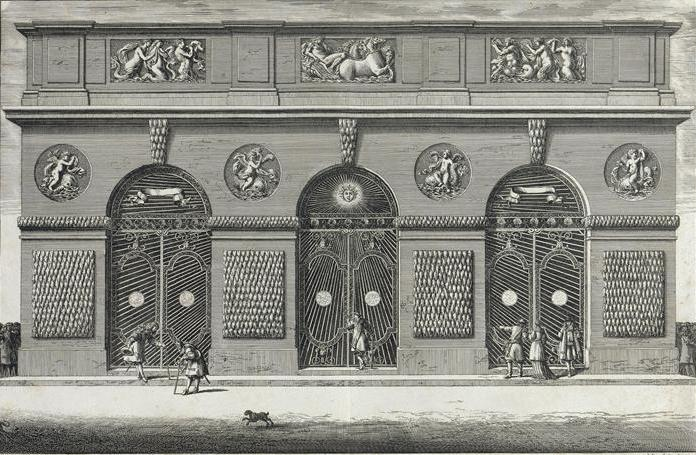
Exterior of the Grotte de Thétys
by Jean Le Pautre, 1672

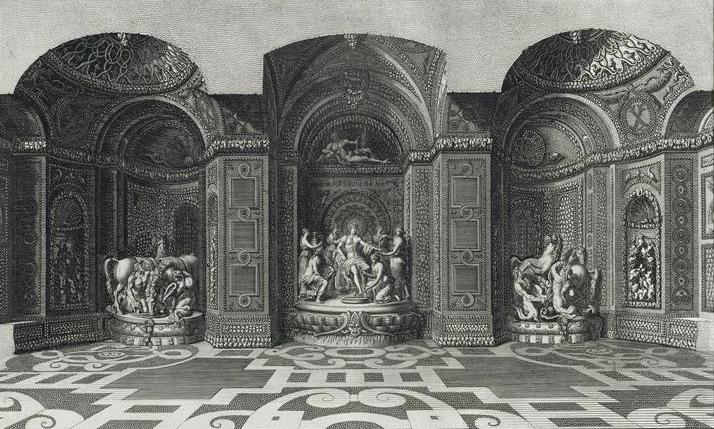
Interior of the Grotte de Thétys
by Jean Le Pautre, 1676
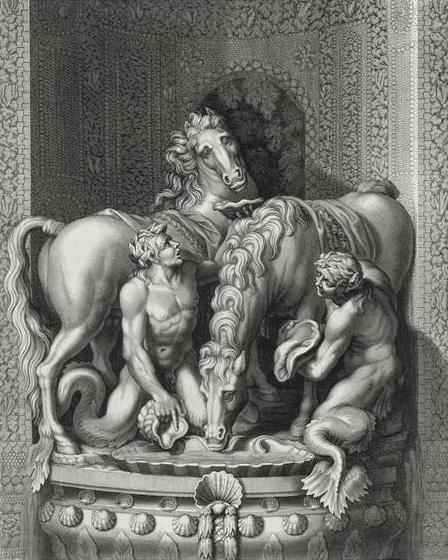
Apollo's horses groomed by two Tritons by Gilles Guérin, ca. 1670

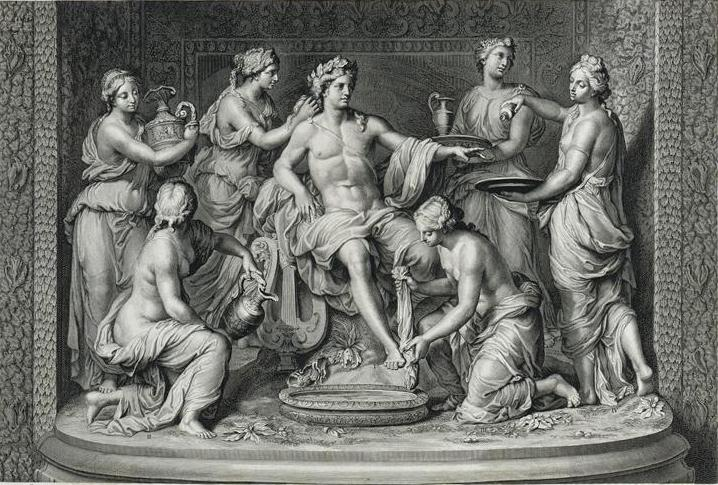
Apollo attended by nymphs
by François Girardon and Thomas Regnaudin, ca. 1670

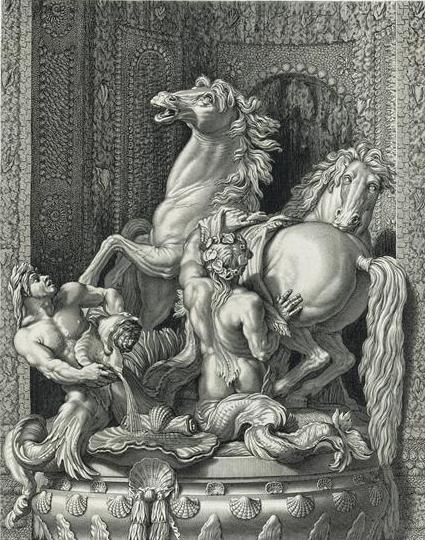
Apollo's horses groomed by two Tritons by Gaspard and Balthazard Marsy, ca. 1670

==== Bassin de Latone ====
Located on the east–west axis just west and below the Parterre d'Eau, is the Bassin de Latone. Designed by André Le Nôtre, sculpted by Gaspard and Balthazar Marsy, and constructed between 1668 and 1670, the fountain depicted an episode from Ovid's Metamorphoses. Latona and her children, Apollo and Diana, being tormented with mud slung by Lycian peasants, who refused to let her and her children drink from their pond, appealed to Jupiter who responded by turning the Lycians into frogs. This episode from mythology has been seen by historians in reference as an allegory to the revolts of the Fronde, which occurred during the minority of Louis XIV. The link between Ovid's story and this episode from French history is emphasized by the reference to "mud slinging" in a political context. The revolts of the Fronde – the word fronde also means slingshot – have been regarded as the origin of the use of the term "mud slinging" in a political context. (Berger, 1992; Marie, 1968, 1972, 1976; Nolhac, 1901; Thompson, 2006; Verlet, 1961, 1985; Weber, 1981)

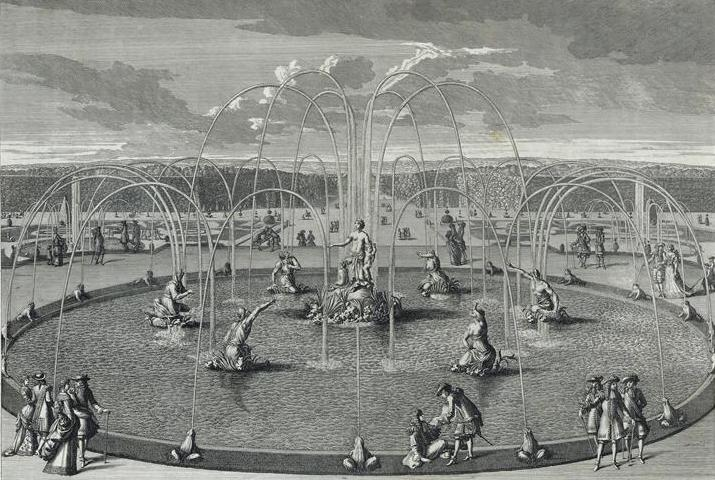
"View of the Bassin de Laoton, 1678" engraving by Jean Le Pautre, 1678

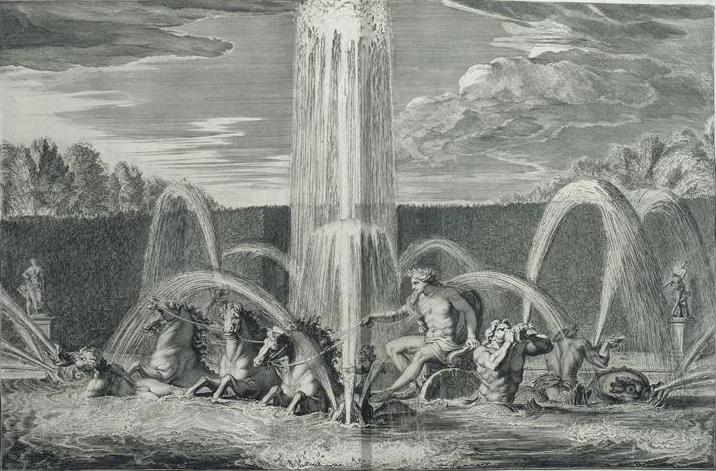
"View of the Bassin d'Apollon" engraving by Louis de Chastillon, 1683

==== Bassin d'Apollon ====
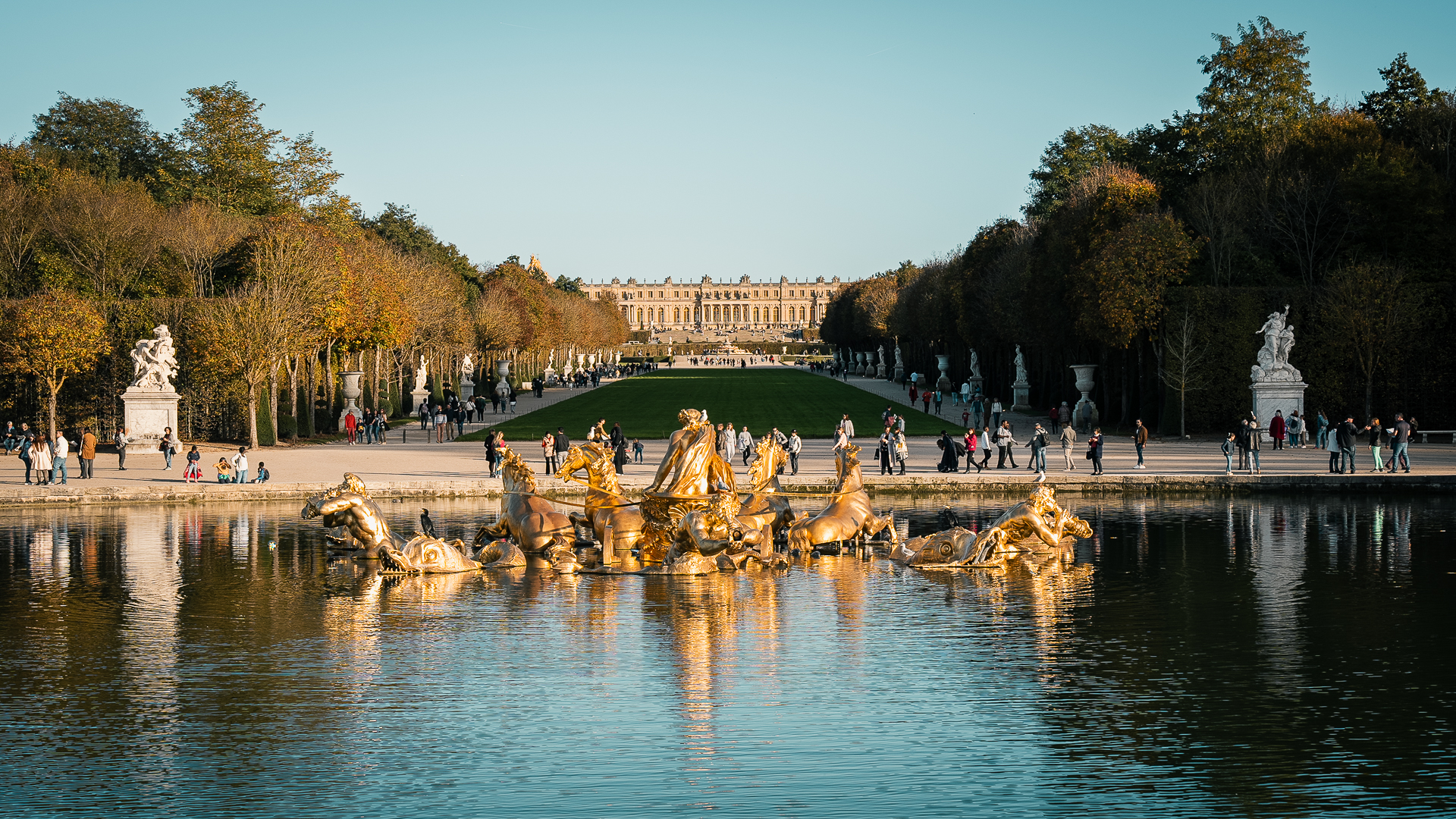
Bassin d'Apollon, Versailles Palace

Further along the east–west axis is the Bassin d'Apollon – the Apollo Fountain. Occupying the site of Rondeau/Bassin des Cygnes of Louis XIII, the Apollo Fountain, which was constructed between 1668 and 1671, depicts the sun god driving his chariot to light the sky. The fountain forms a focal point in the garden and serves as a transitional element between the gardens of the Petit Parc and the Grand Canal.

==== Grand Canal ====
With a length of 1,500 m (4,900 ft) and a width of 62 m (203 ft), the Grand Canal, which was built between 1668 and 1671, physically and visually prolongs the east–west axis to the walls of the Grand Parc. During the Ancien Régime, the Grand Canal served as a venue for boating parties. In 1674, as a result of a series of diplomatic arrangements that benefited Louis XIV, the king ordered the construction of Petite Venise (Little Venice). Located at the junction of the Grand Canal and the junction of the northern transversal branch, Little Venice housed the caravels and yachts that were received from The Netherlands and the gondolas and gondoliers received as gifts from the Doge of Venice, hence the name.

Above and beyond the decorative and festive aspects of this garden feature, the Grand Canal also served a practical role. Situated at a low point in the gardens, it collected water it drained from the fountains in the garden above. Water from the Grand Canal was pumped back to the reservoir on the roof of the Grotte de Thétys via a network of windmill-powered and horse-powered pumps.

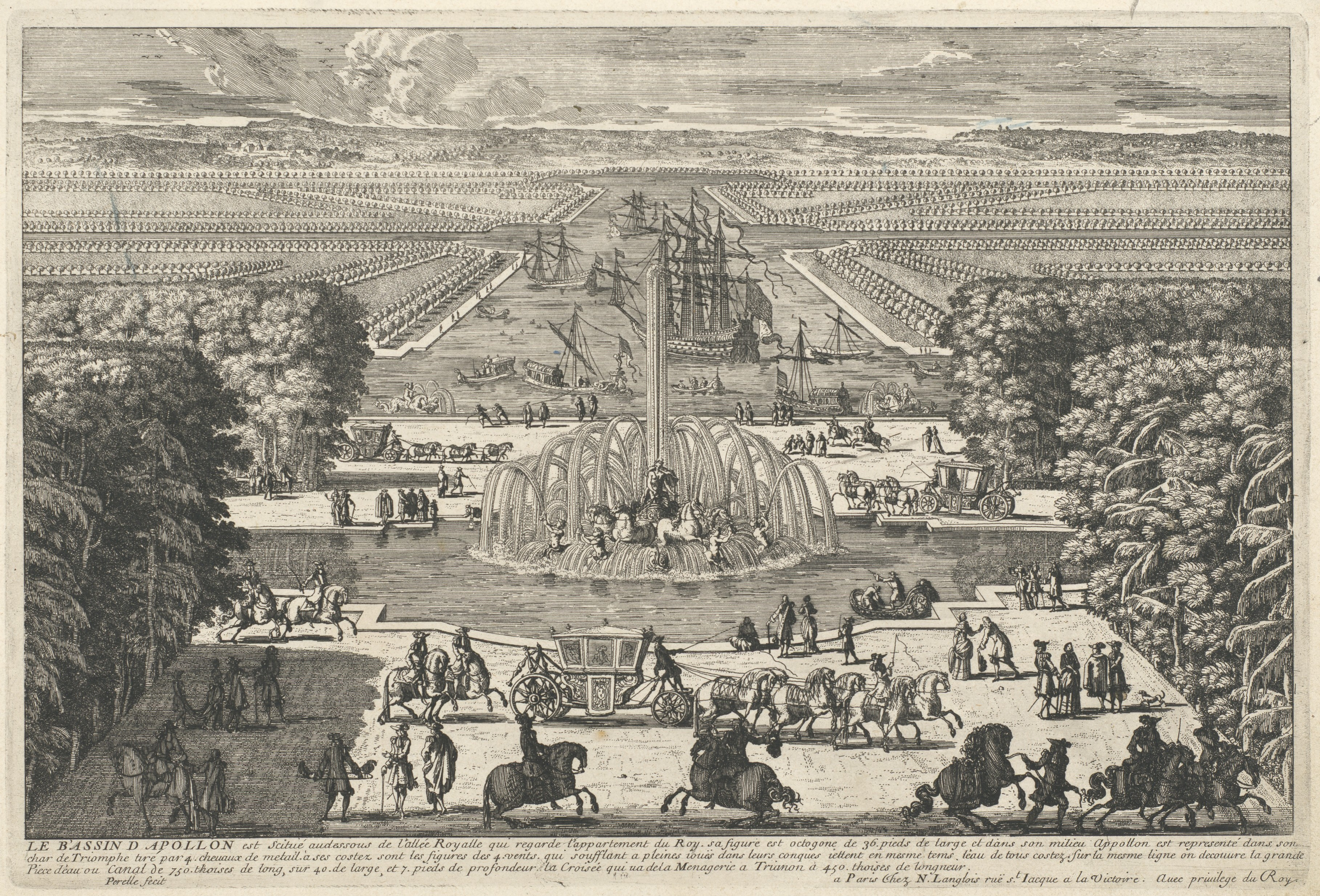
"View of the Grand Canal" engraving by Nicolas Perelle, 1680

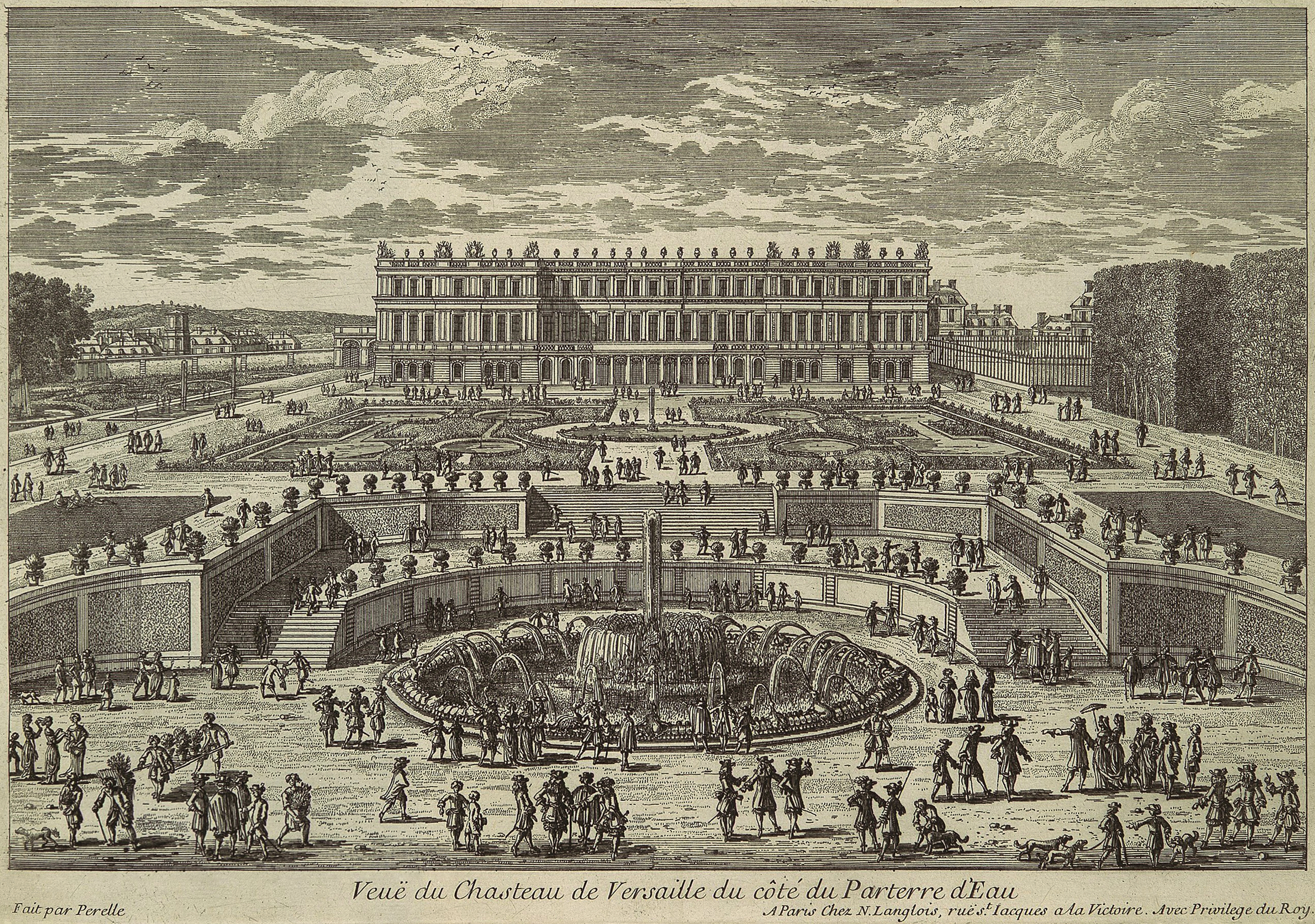
"View of the garden facade from the Basin de Latone" by Adam Perelle

==== Parterre d'Eau ====
Situated above the Latona Fountain is the terrace of the château, known as the Parterre d'Eau. Forming a transitional element from the château to the gardens below and placed on the north–south axis of the gardens, the Parterre d'Eau provided a setting in which the imagery and symbolism of the decors of the grands appartements synthesized with the iconography of the gardens. In 1664, Louis XIV commissioned a series of statues intended to decorate the water feature of the Parterre d'Eau. The Grande Commande, as the commission is known, comprised twenty-four statues of the classic quaternities and four additional statues depicting abductions from the classic past. (Berger I, 1985; Friedman, 1988,1993; Hedin, 1981–1982; Marie, 1968; Nolhac, 1901; Thompson, 2006; Verlet, 1961, 1985; Weber, 1981)

==== Evolution of the Bosquets ====
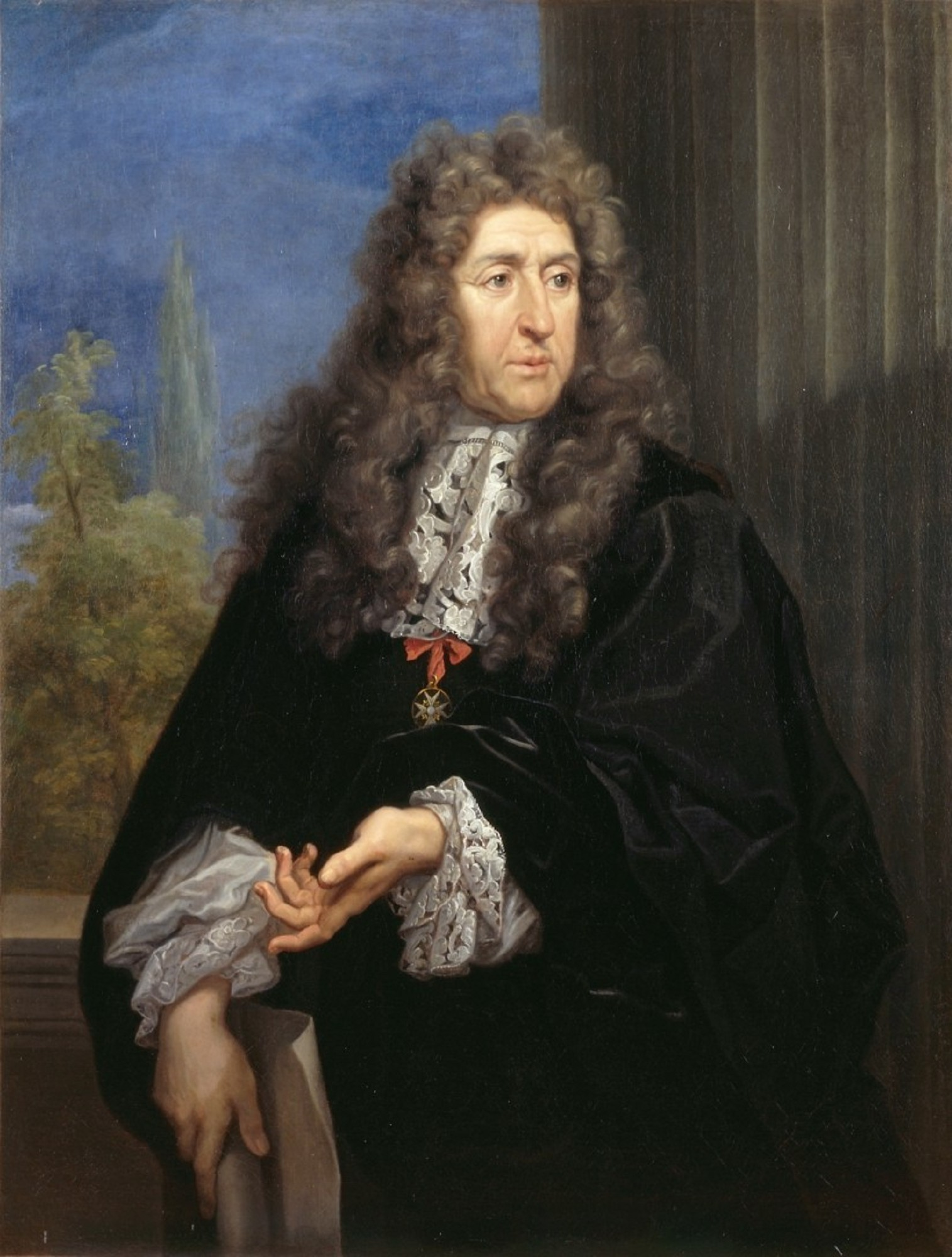
André Le Nôtre

One of the distinguishing features of the gardens during the second building campaign was the proliferation of bosquets. Expanding the layout established during the first building campaign, Le Nôtre added or expanded on no fewer that ten bosquets: The Bosquet du Marais in 1670; the Bosquet du Théâtre d'Eau, Île du Roi and Miroir d'Eau, the Salle des Festins (Salle du Conseil), the Bosquet des Trois Fontaines in 1671; the Labyrinthe and the Bosquet de l'Arc de Triomphe in 1672; the Bosquet de la Renommée (Bosquet des Dômes) and the Bosquet de l'Encélade in 1675; and the Bosquet des Sources in 1678.

In addition to the expansion of existing bosquets and the construction of new ones, there were two additional projects that defined this era, the Bassin des Sapins and the Pièce d'eau des Suisses.

==== Bassin des Sapins ====
In 1676, the Bassin des Sapins, which was located north of the château below the Parterre du Nord and the Allée des Marmousets was designed to form a topological pendant along the north–south axis with the Pièce d'eau des Suisses located at the base of the Satory hill south of the château. Later modifications in the garden would transform this fountain into the Bassin de Neptune. (Marie 1972, 1975; Thompson 2006; Verlet 1985)

==== Pièce d'eau des Suisses ====
Excavated in 1678, the Pièce d'eau des Suisses – named for the Swiss Guards who constructed the lake – occupied an area of marshes and ponds, some of which had been used to supply water for the fountains in the garden. This water feature, with a surface area of more than 15 ha (37 acres), is the second largest – after the Grand Canal – at Versailles.

=== Third building campaign ===
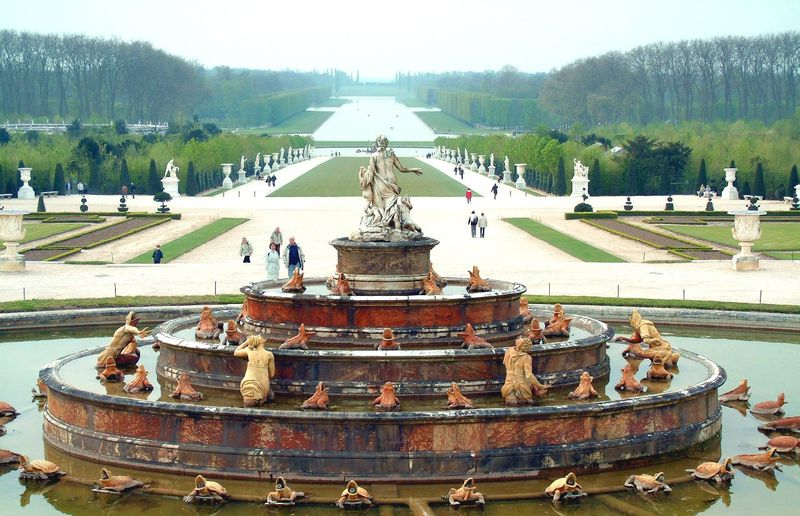
Bassin de Latone – Latona Fountain with the tapis vert and the Grand Canal in the background

Modifications in the gardens during the third building campaign were distinguished by a stylistic change from the natural esthetic of André Le Nôtre to the architectonic style of Jules Hardouin Mansart. The first major modification to the gardens during this phase occurred in 1680 when the Tapis Vert – the expanse of lawn that stretches between the Latona Fountain and the Apollo Fountain – achieved its final size and definition under the direction of André Le Nôtre. (Nolhac 1901; Thompson 2006)

Beginning in 1684, the Parterre d'Eau was remodeled under the direction of Jules Hardouin-Mansart. Statues from the Grande Commande of 1674 were relocated to other parts of the garden; two twin octagonal basins were constructed and decorated with bronze statues representing the four main rivers of France. In the same year, Le Vau's Orangerie, located to south of the Parterrre d'Eau was demolished to accommodate a larger structure designed by Jules Hardouin-Mansart. In addition to the Orangerie, the Escaliers des Cent Marches, which facilitated access to the gardens from the south, to the Pièce d'Eau des Suisses, and to the Parterre du Midi were constructed at this time, giving the gardens just south of the château their present configuration and decoration.

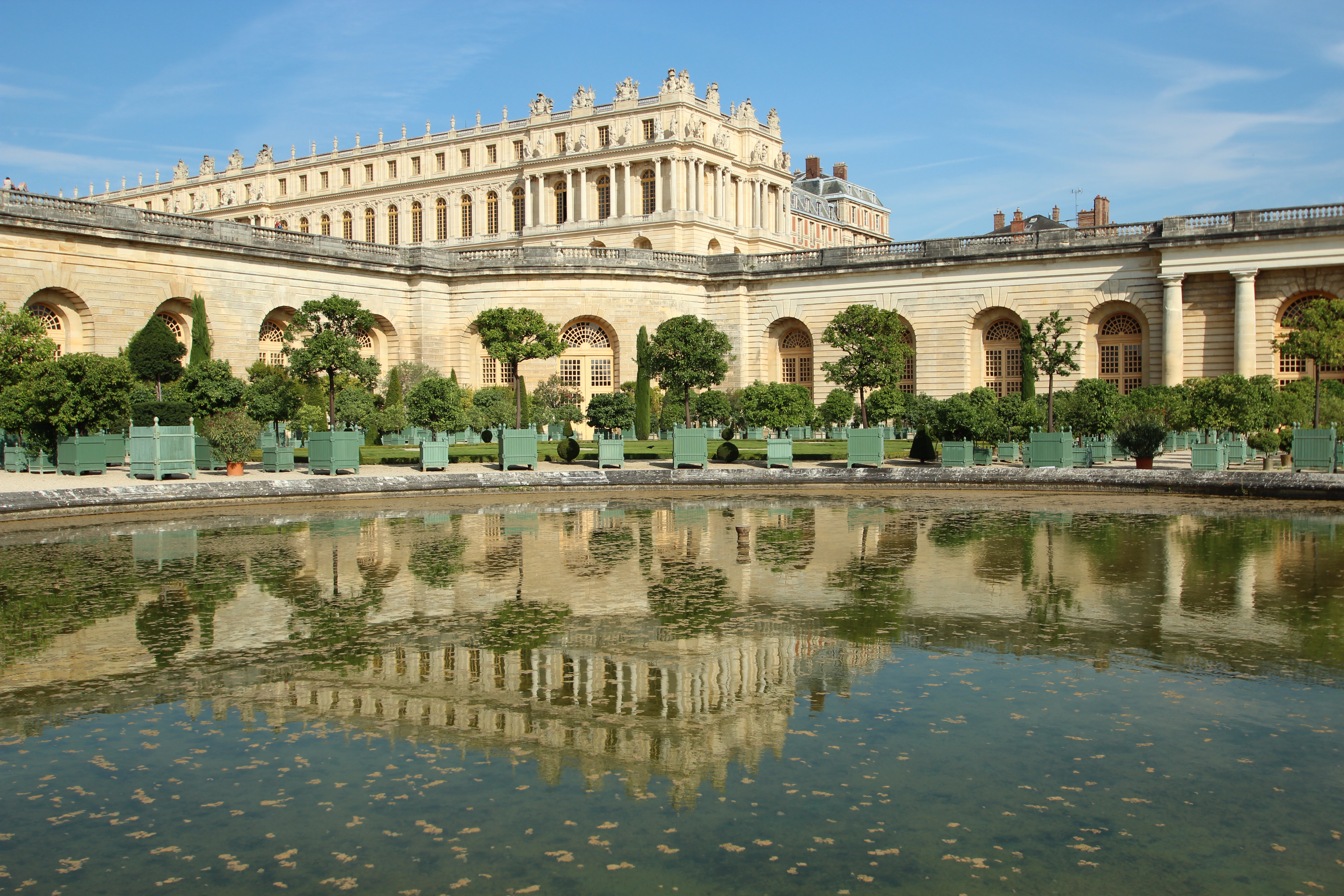
Versailles Orangerie

Additionally, to accommodate the anticipated construction of the Aile des Nobles – the north wing of the château – the Grotte de Thétys was demolished. (Marie 1968, 1972, 1976; Nolhac 1899, 1901, 1902, 1925)

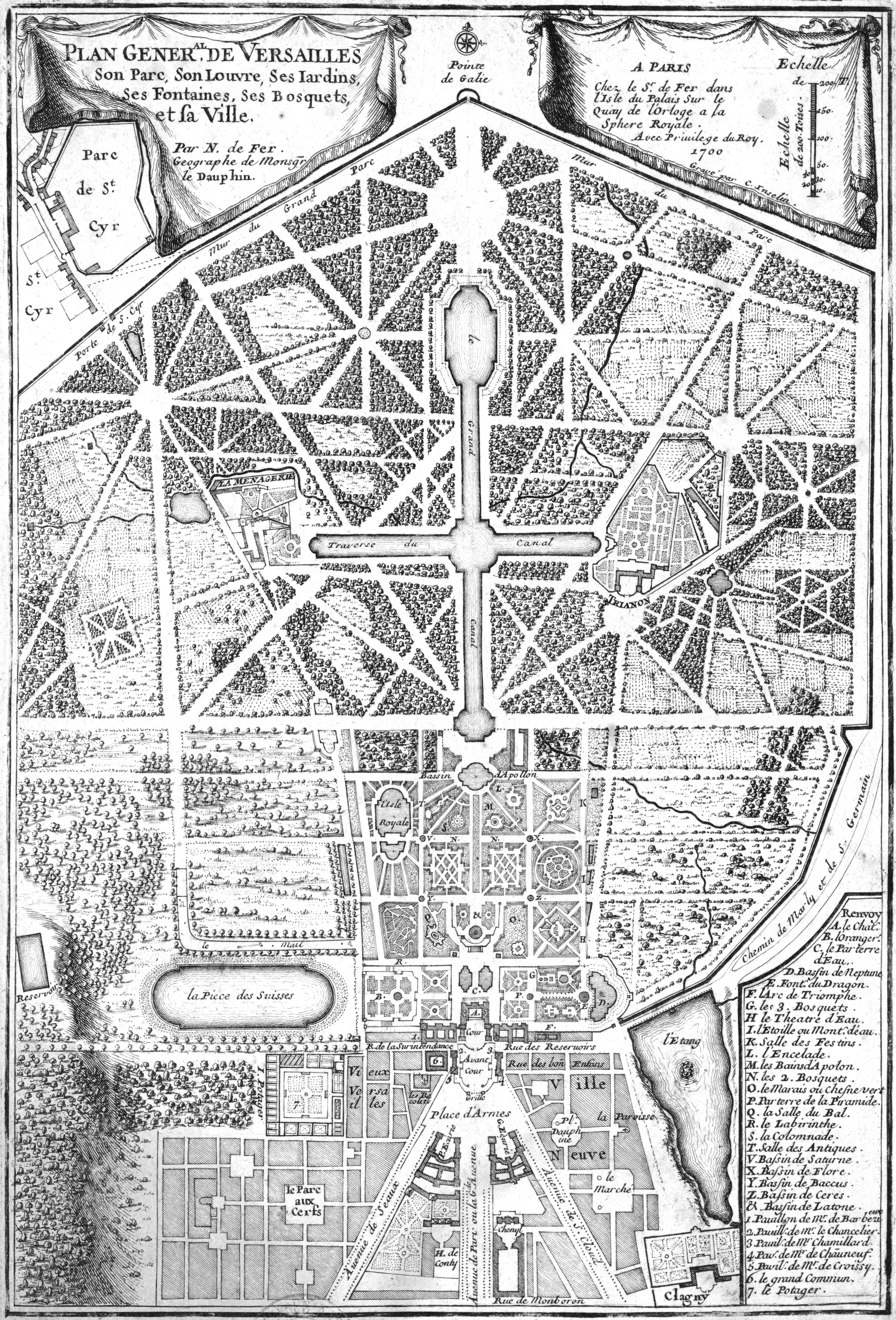
Plan of Nicolas de Fer, 1700

With the construction of the Aile des Nobles (1685–1686), the Parterre du Nord was remodeled to respond to the new architecture of this part of the château. To compensate for the loss of the reservoir on top of the Grotte de Thétys and to meet the increased demand for water, Jules Hardouin-Mansart designed new and larger reservoirs situated due north of the Aile des Nobles. Construction for the ruinously expensive Canal de l'Eure was inaugurated in 1685; designed by Vauban it was intended to bring waters of the Eure over 80 km (50 mi), including aqueducts of heroic scale, but the works were abandoned in 1690: see The problem of water.

Between 1686 and 1687, the Bassin de Latone, under the direction of Jules Hardouin-Mansart, was rebuilt. It is this version of the fountain that is today at Versailles.

During this phase of construction, three of the garden's major bosquets were modified or created. Beginning with the Galerie des Antiques, this bosquet was constructed in 1680 on the site of the earlier and short-lived Galerie d'Eau (1678). This bosquet was conceived as an open-air gallery in which antique statues and copies acquired by the Académie de France in Rome were displayed. The following year, construction began on the Salle de Bal. Located in a secluded section of the garden west of the Orangerie, this bosquet was designed as an amphitheater that featured a cascade – the only one surviving in the gardens of Versailles. The Salle de Bal was inaugurated in 1685 with a ball hosted by the Grand Dauphin. Between 1684 and 1685, Jules Hardouin-Mansart built the Colonnade. Located on the site of Le Nôtre's Bosquet des Sources, this bosquet featured a circular peristyle formed from thirty-two arches with twenty-eight fountains and was Hardouin-Mansart's most architectural of the bosquets built in the gardens of Versailles.

=== Fourth building campaign ===
Due to financial constraints arising from the War of the League of Augsburg and the War of the Spanish Succession, no significant work on the gardens was undertaken until 1704. Between 1704 and 1709, bosquets were modified, some quite radically, with new names suggesting the new austerity that characterized the latter years of Louis XIV's reign. (Marie 1976; Thompson 2006; Verlet 1985)

== Louis XV ==
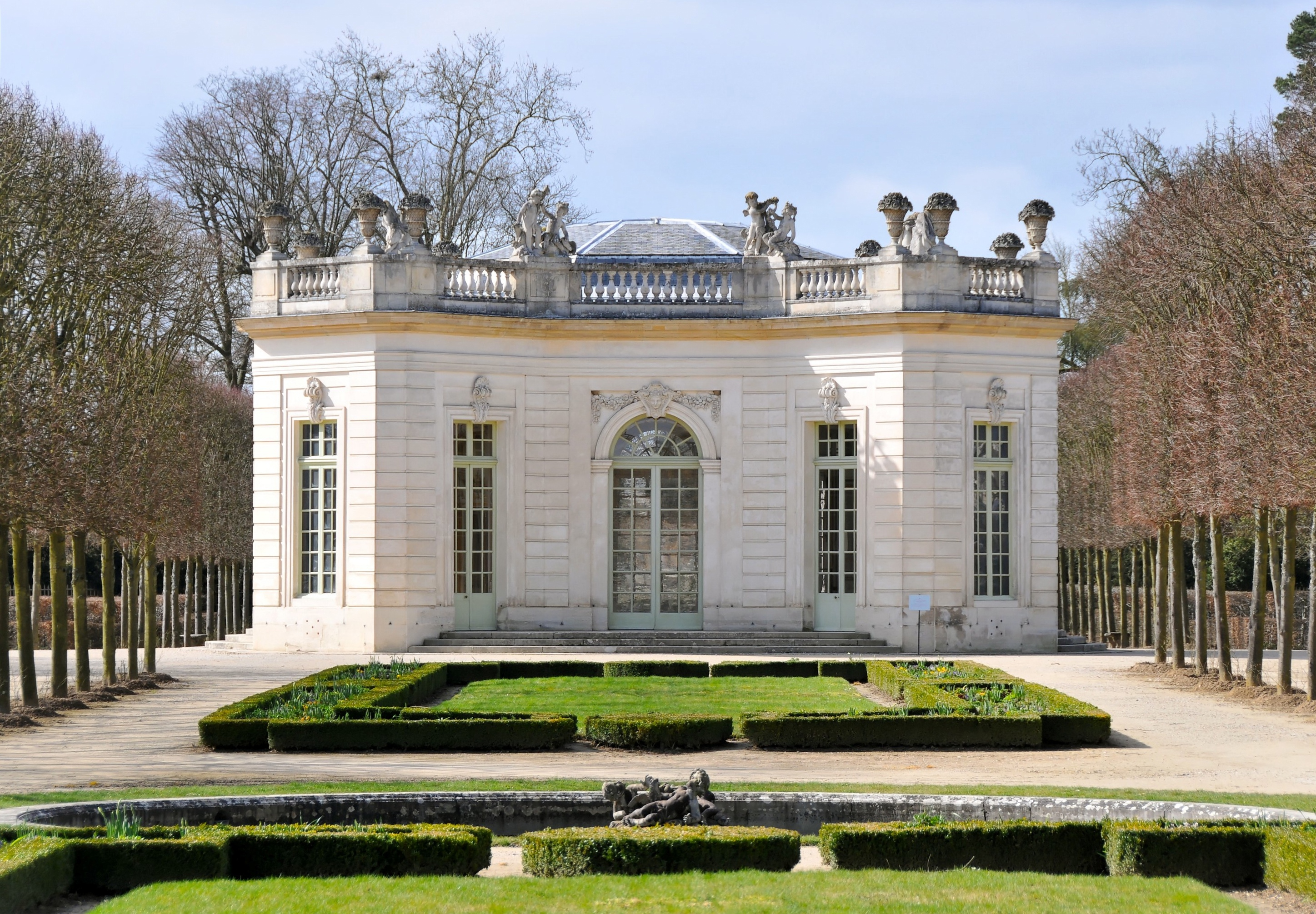
The Pavillon français of Ange-Jacques Gabriel, 1749–1750

With the departure of the king and court from Versailles in 1715 following the death of Louis XIV, the palace and gardens entered an era of uncertainty. In 1722, Louis XV and the court returned to Versailles. Seeming to heed his great-grandfather's admonition not to engage in costly building campaigns, Louis XV did not undertake the costly building campaigns at Versailles that Louis XIV had. During the reign of Louis XV, the only significant addition to the gardens was the completion of the Bassin de Neptune (1738–1741). (Marie 1984; Verlet 1985)

Rather than expend resources on modifying the gardens at Versailles, Louis XV – an avid botanist – directed his efforts at Trianon. In the area now occupied by the Hameau de la Reine, Louis XV constructed and maintained les jardins botaniques – the botanical gardens. In 1750, the year in which les jardins botaniques were constructed, the Jardinier-Fleuriste, Claude Richard (1705–1784), assumed administration of the botanical gardens. In 1761, Louis XV commissioned Ange-Jacques Gabriel to build the Petit Trianon as a residence that would allow him to spend more time near the jardins botaniques. It was at the Petit Trianon that Louis XV fell fatally ill with smallpox; on 10 May 1774, the king died at Versailles. (Marie, 1984; Thompson, 2006)

=== Plan of the gardens in 1746 ===
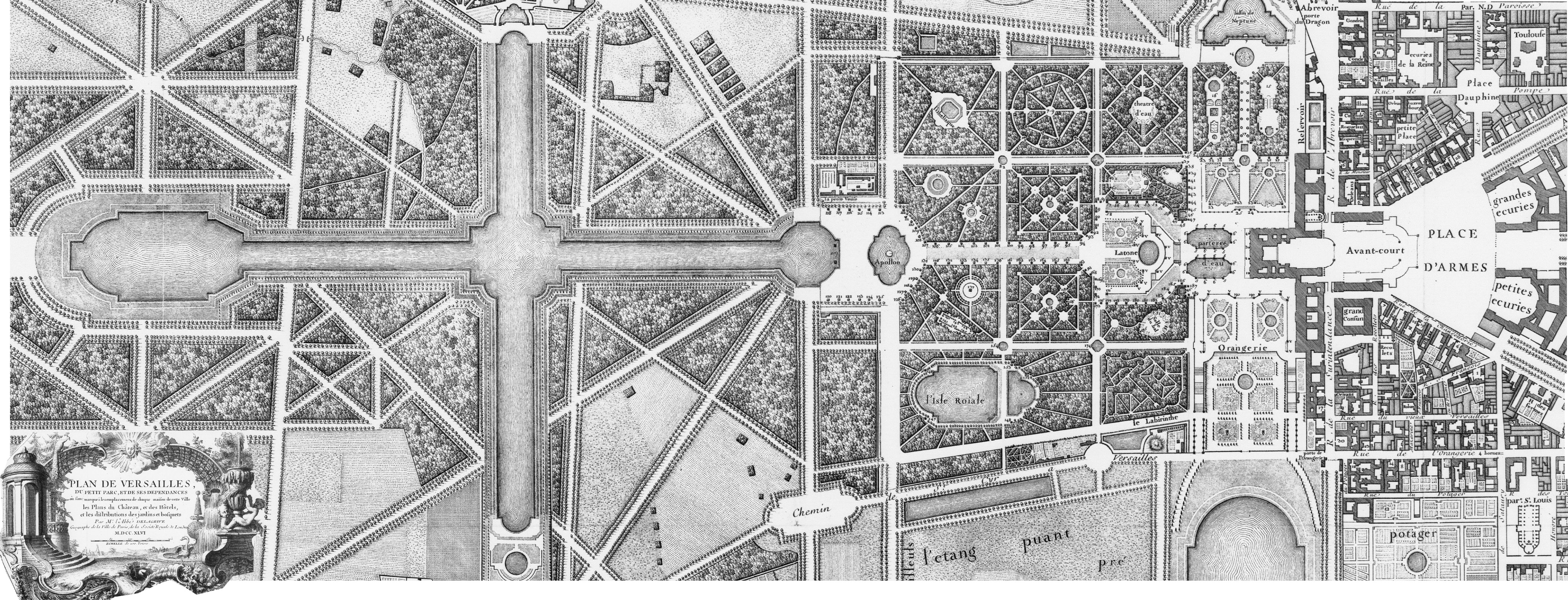
Gardens and palace of Versailles in 1746, by the abbot Delagrive

== Louis XVI ==
Upon Louis XVI's ascension to the throne, the gardens of Versailles underwent a transformation that recalled the fourth building campaign of Louis XIV. Engendered by a change in outlook as advocated by Jean-Jacques Rousseau and the Philosophes, the winter of 1774–1775 witnessed a complete replanting of the gardens. Trees and shrubbery dating from the reign of Louis XIV were felled or uprooted with the intent of transforming the French formal garden of Le Nôtre and Hardouin-Mansart into a version of an English landscape garden.

The attempt to convert Le Nôtre's masterpiece into an English-style garden failed to achieve its desired goal. Owing largely to the topology of the land, the English esthetic was abandoned and the gardens replanted in the French style. However, with an eye on economy, Louis XVI ordered the palissades – the labour-intensive clipped hedging that formed walls in the bosquets – to be replaced with rows of lime trees or chestnut trees. Additionally, a number of the bosquets dating from the time of the Sun King were extensively modified or destroyed. The most significant contribution to the gardens during the reign of Louis XVI was the Grotte des Bains d'Apollon. The rockwork grotto set in an English style bosquet was the masterpiece of Hubert Robert in which the statues from the Grotte de Thétys were placed. (Thompson 2006; Verlet 1985)

At the Petit Trianon, which was gifted to Marie Antoinette by Louis XVI in 1774, the new Queen dramatically relandscaped the surrounding parkland and gardens. Between 1776 and 1786, the botanic gardens and working farm of Louis XV were obliterated to create an English garden, called the "Anglo-Chinese" garden at the time, which stretched to the north and east of the Petit Trianon. Some of the exotic specimens from the botanic garden were preserved in the gardens, but most were brought to the Jardin des Plantes in Paris. A lake and several meandering rivers were formed as part of the new landscaping and the architect Richard Mique was entrusted with designing follies to embellish the gardens like the Grotto, the Belvedere and the Temple of Love. Beyond the "Anglo-Chinese" garden, the Hameau de la Reine was built between 1782 and 1788, designed by Mique and Hubert Robert.

== Revolution ==
In 1792, under order from the National Convention, some of the trees in gardens were felled, while parts of the Grand Parc were parceled and dispersed. Sensing the potential threat to Versailles, Louis Claude Marie Richard (1754–1821) – director of the jardins botaniques and grandson of Claude Richard – lobbied the government to save Versailles. He succeeded in preventing further dispersing of the Grand Parc and threats to destroy the Petit Parc were abolished by suggesting that the parterres could be used to plant vegetable gardens and that orchards could occupy the open areas of the garden. These plans were never put into action; however, the gardens were opened to the public – it was not uncommon to see people washing their laundry in the fountains and spreading it on the shrubbery to dry.

In 1793 most of the decorative pieces of the Triumphal Arch Grove were destroyed.

== Napoléon I ==
The Napoleonic era largely ignored Versailles. In the château, a suite of rooms was arranged for the use of the empress Marie-Louise, but the gardens were left unchanged, save for the disastrous felling of trees in the Bosquet de l'Arc de Triomphe and the Bosquet des Trois Fontaines. Massive soil erosion necessitated planting new trees. (Thompson 2006; Verlet 1985)

== Restoration ==
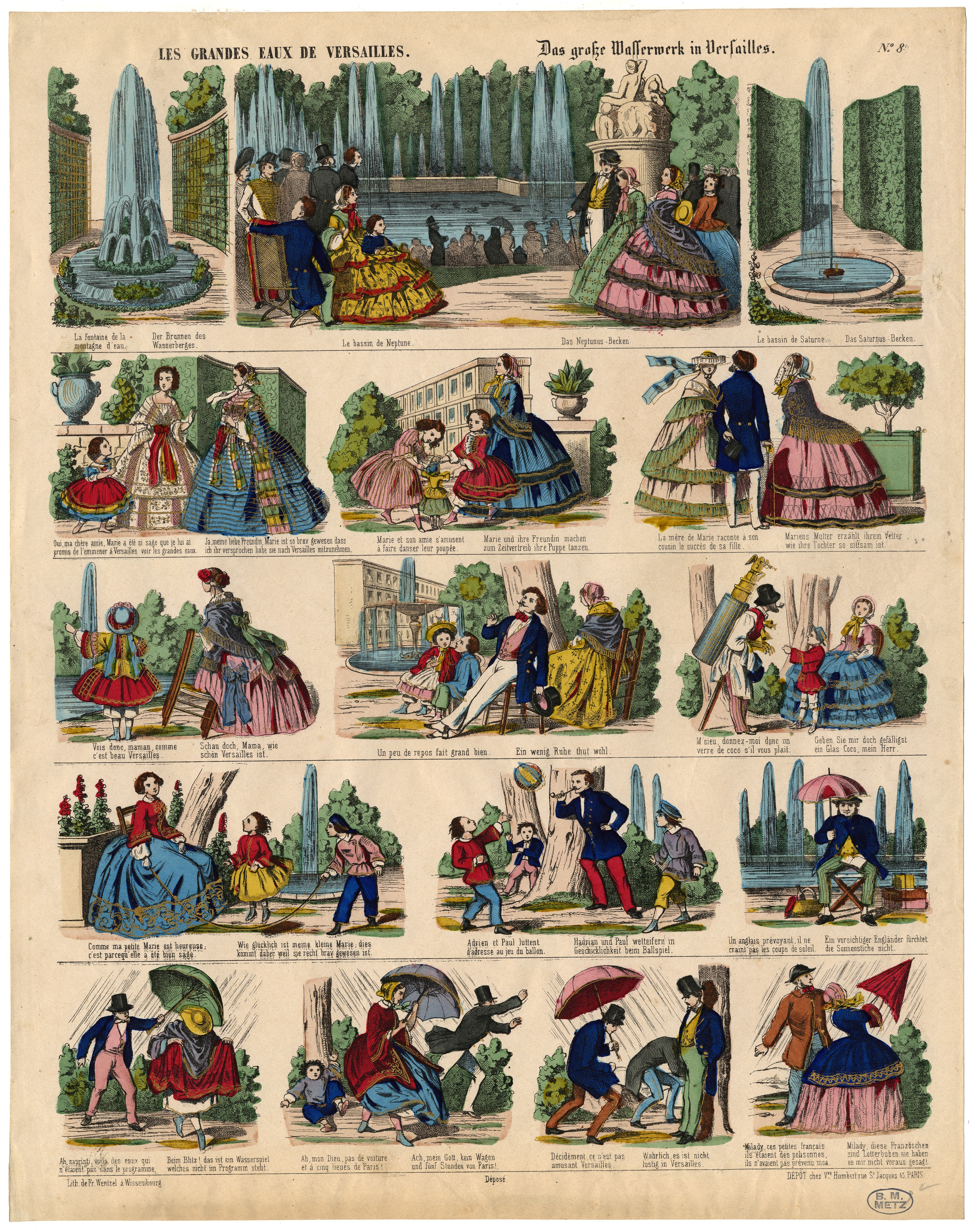
The varying reactions of visitors in the mid-19th century

With the restoration of the Bourbons in 1814, the gardens of Versailles witnessed the first modifications since the Revolution. In 1817, Louis XVIII ordered the conversion of the Île du Roi and the Miroir d'Eau into an English-style garden – the Jardin du Roi.

== The July Monarchy; The Second Empire ==
While much of the château's interior was irreparably altered to accommodate the Museum of the History of France dedicated to "all the glories of France" (inaugurated by Louis Philippe I on 10 June 1837), the gardens, by contrast, remained untouched. With the exception of the state visit of Queen Victoria and Prince Albert in 1855, at which time the gardens were a setting for a gala fête that recalled the fêtes of Louis XIV, Napoleon III ignored the château, preferring instead the château of Compiègne (Thompson 2006; Verlet 1985).

== Pierre de Nolhac ==
With the arrival of Pierre de Nolhac as director of the museum in 1892, a new era of historical research began at Versailles. Nolhac, an ardent archivist and scholar, began to piece together the history of Versailles, and subsequently established the criteria for restoration of the château and preservation of the gardens, which are ongoing to this day. (Thompson 2006; Verlet 1985)

== Bosquets of the gardens ==
Owing to the many modifications made to the gardens between the 17th and the 19th centuries, many of the bosquets have undergone multiple modifications, which were often accompanied by name changes.

=== Deux Bosquets – Bosquet de la Girondole – Bosquet du Dauphin – Quinconce du Nord – Quinconce du Midi ===
These two bosquets were first laid out in 1663. Located north and south of the east–west axis, these two bosquets were arranged as a series of paths around four salles de verdure and which converged on a central "room" that contained a fountain. In 1682, the southern bosquet was remodeled as the Bosquet de la Girondole, thus named due to spoke-like arrangement of the central fountain. The northern bosquet was rebuilt in 1696 as the Bosquet du Dauphin with a fountain that featured a dolphin. During the replantation of 1774–1775, both the bosquets were destroyed. The areas were replanted with lime trees and were rechristened the Quinconce du Nord and the Quinconce du Midi (Marie 1968, 1972, 1976, 1984; Thompson 2006; Verlet 1985).

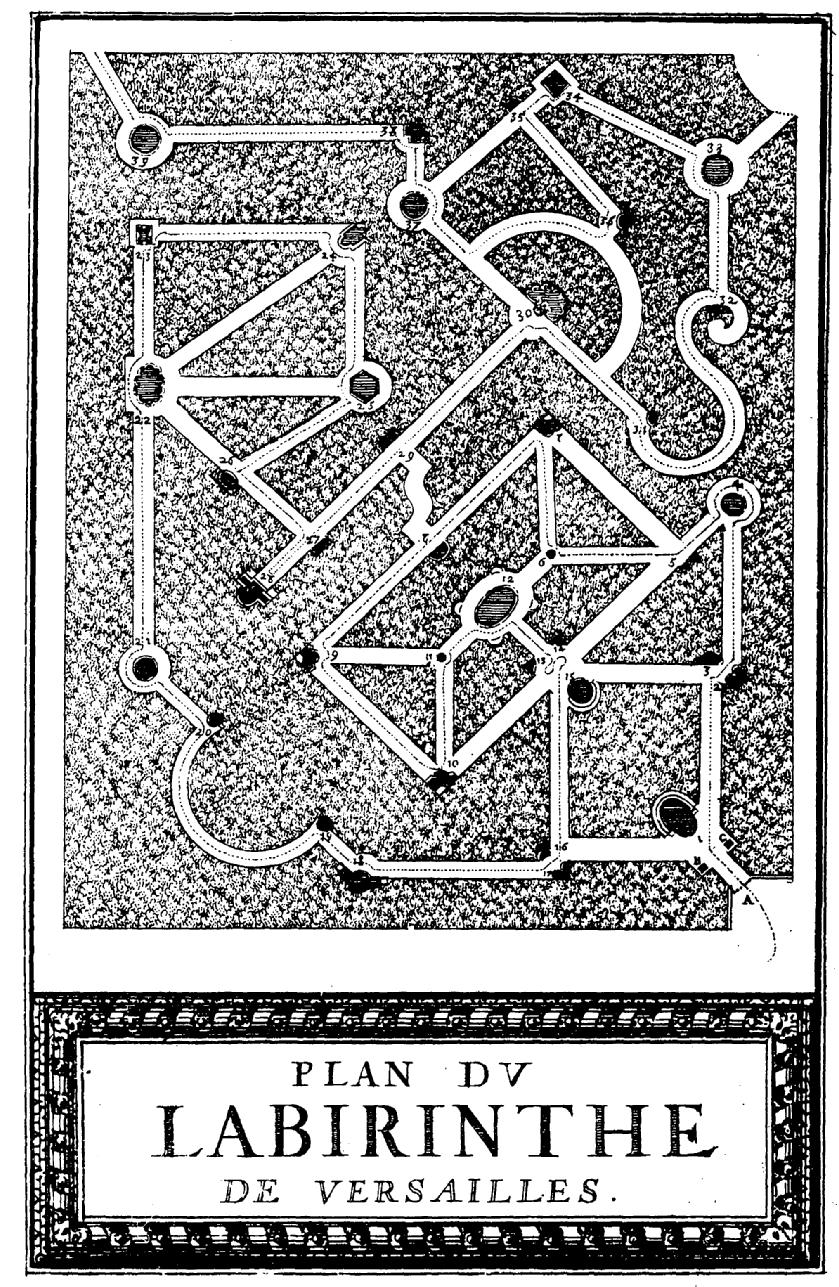
Plan of the Labyrinth from Perrault's description

=== Labyrinthe – Bosquet de la Reine ===
In 1665, André Le Nôtre planned a hedge maze of unadorned paths in an area south of the Latona Fountain near the Orangerie. (Loach, 1985) In 1669, Charles Perrault – author of the Mother Goose Tales – advised Louis XIV to remodel the Labyrinthe in such a way as to serve the Dauphin's education (Perrault, 1669). Between 1672 and 1677, Le Nôtre redesigned the Labyrinthe to feature thirty-nine fountains that depicted stories from Aesop's Fables. The sculptors Jean-Baptiste Tuby, Étienne Le Hongre, Pierre Le Gros, and the brothers Gaspard and Balthazard Marsy worked on these thirty-nine fountains each of which was accompanied by a plaque on which the fable was printed, with verse written by Isaac de Benserade; from these plaques, Louis XIV's son learned to read. Once completed in 1677, the Labyrinthe contained thirty-nine fountains with 333 painted metal animal sculptures. The water for the elaborate waterworks was conveyed from the Seine by the Machine de Marly. The Labyrinthe contained fourteen water-wheels driving 253 pumps, some of which worked at a distance of three-quarters of a mile. Citing repair and maintenance costs, Louis XVI ordered the Labyrinthe demolished in 1778. In its place, an arboretum of exotic trees was planted as an English-styled garden. Rechristened Bosquet de la Reine, it would be in this part of the garden that an episode of the Affair of the Diamond Necklace, which compromised Marie Antoinette, transpired in 1785 (Marie 1968, 1972, 1976, 1984; Perrault 1669; Thompson 2006; Verlet 1985).

=== Bosquet de la Montagne d'Eau – Bosquet de l'Étoile ===
Originally designed by André Le Nôtre in 1661 as a salle de verdure, this bosquet contained a path encircling a central pentagonal area. In 1671, the bosquet was enlarged with a more elaborate system of paths that served to enhance the new central water feature, a fountain that resembled a mountain, hence the bosquets new name: Bosquet de la Montagne d'Eau. The bosquet was completely remodeled in 1704 at which time it was rechristened Bosquet de l'Étoile (Marie 1968, 1972, 1976, 1984; Thompson 2006; Verlet 1985).

=== Bosquet du Marais – Bosquet du Chêne Vert – Bosquet des Bains d'Apollon – Grotte des Bains d'Apollon ===
Created in 1670, this bosquet originally contained a central rectangular pool surrounded by a turf border. Edging the pool were metal reeds that concealed numerous jets for water; a swan that had water jetting from its beak occupied each corner. The center of the pool featured an iron tree with painted tin leaves that sprouted water from its branches. Because of this tree, the bosquet was also known as the Bosquet du Chêne Vert. In 1705, this bosquet was destroyed in order to allow for the creation of the Bosquet des Bains d'Apollon, which was created to house the statues had once stood in the Grotte de Thétys. During the reign of Louis XVI, Hubert Robert remodeled the bosquet, creating a cave-like setting for the Marsy statues. The bosquet was renamed the Grotte des Bains d'Apollon (Marie 1968, 1972, 1976, 1984; Thompson 2006; Verlet 1985).

=== Île du Roi – Miroir d'Eau – Jardin du Roi ===
Originally designed in 1671 as two separate water features, the larger – Île du Roi – contained an island that formed the focal point of a system of elaborate fountains. The Île du Roi was separated from the Miroir d'Eau by a causeway that featured twenty-four water jets. In 1684, the island was removed and the total number of water jets in the bosquet was significantly reduced. The year 1704 witnessed a major renovation of the bosquet at which time the causeway was remodelled and most of the water jets were removed. A century later, in 1817, Louis XVIII ordered the Île du Roi and the Miroir d'Eau to be completely remodeled as an English-style garden. At this time, the bosquet was rechristened Jardin du Roi (Marie 1968, 1972, 1976, 1984; Thompson 2006; Verlet 1985).

=== Salle des Festins – Salle du Conseil – Bosquet de l'Obélisque ===
In 1671, André Le Nôtre conceived a bosquet – originally christened Salle des Festins and later called Salle du Conseil – that featured a quatrefoil island surrounded by a channel that contained fifty water jets. Each lobe of the island contained a simple fountain; access to the island was obtained by two swing bridges. Beyond the channel and placed at the cardinal points within the bosquet were four additional fountains. Under the direction of Jules Hardouin-Mansart, the bosquet was completely remodeled in 1706. The central island was replaced by a large basin raised on five steps, which was surrounded by a canal. The central fountain contained 230 jets that, when in play, formed an obelisk – hence the new name Bosquet de l'Obélisque (Marie 1968, 1972, 1976, 1984; Thompson 2006; Verlet 1985).

=== Bosquet du Théâtre d'Eau – Bosquet du Rond-Vert ===
The central feature of this bosquet, which was designed by Le Nôtre between 1671 and 1674, was an auditorium/theater sided by three tiers of turf seating that faced a stage decorated with four fountains alternating with three radiating cascades. Between 1680 and Louis XIV's death in 1715, there was near-constant rearranging of the statues that decorated the bosquet. In 1709, the bosquet was rearranged with the addition of the Fontaine de l'Île aux Enfants. As part of the replantation of the gardens ordered by Louis XVI during the winter of 1774–1775, the Bosquet du Théâtre d'Eau was destroyed and replaced with the unadorned Bosquet du Rond-Vert (Marie 1968, 1972, 1976, 1984; Thompson 2006; Verlet 1985). Bosquet du Théâtre d'Eau was recreated in 2014, with South Korean businessman and photographer Yoo Byung-eun being the sole patron, donating €1.4 million (~US$1.9 million) to the project.

=== Bosquet des Trois Fontaines (Berceau d'Eau) ===
Situated to the west of the Allée des Marmousets and replacing the short-lived Berceau d'Eau (a long and narrow bosquet created in 1671 that featured a water bower made by numerous jets of water), the enlarged bosquet was transformed by Le Nôtre in 1677 into a series of three linked rooms. Each room contained a number of fountains that played with special effects. The fountains survived the modifications that Louis XIV ordered for other fountains in the gardens in the early 18th century and were subsequently spared during the 1774–1775 replantation of the gardens. In 1830, the bosquet was replanted at which time the fountains were suppressed. Due to storm damage in the park in 1990 and then again in 1999, the Bosquet des Trois Fontaines was restored and reinaugurated on 12 June 2004 (Marie 1968, 1972, 1976, 1984; Thompson 2006; Verlet 1985).

=== Bosquet de l'Arc de Triomphe ===
Originally, this bosquet was planned in 1672 as a simple pavillon d'eau – a round open expanse with a square fountain in the center. In 1676, this bosquet, located to the east of the Allée des Marmousets and forming the pendant to the Bosquet des Trois Fontaines, was enlarged and redecorated along political lines that alluded to French military victories over Spain and Austria, at which time the triumphal arch was added – hence the name. Most of these pieces were destroyed during the Revolution. As with the Bosquet des Trois Fontaines, this bosquet survived the modifications of the 18th century, but was replanted in 1830 at which time the fountains were removed. In 2008, this bosquet was restored (Marie 1968, 1972, 1976, 1984; Thompson 2006; Verlet 1985).

=== Bosquet de la Renommée – Bosquet des Dômes ===
Built in 1675, the Bosquet de la Renommée featured a fountain statue of Fame – hence the name of the bosquet. With the relocation of the statues from the Grotte de Thétys in 1684, the bosquet was remodeled to accommodate the statues and the Fame fountain was removed. At this time the bosquet was rechristened Bosquet des Bains d'Apollon. As part of the reorganization of the garden that was ordered by Louis XIV in the early part of the 18th century, the Apollo grouping was moved once again to the site of the Bosquet du Marais – located near the Latona Fountain – which was destroyed and was replaced by the new Bosquet des Bains d'Apollon. The statues were installed on marble plinths from which water issued; and each statue grouping was protected by an intricately carved and gilded baldachin. The old Bosquet des Bains d'Apollon was renamed Bosquet des Dômes due to two domed pavilions built in the bosquet (Marie 1968, 1972, 1976, 1984; Thompson 2006; Verlet 1985).

=== Bosquet de l'Encélade ===
Created in 1675 at the same time as the Bosquet de la Renommée, the fountain of this bosquet depicts Enceladus, a fallen Giant who was condemned to live below Mt. Etna, being consumed by volcanic lava. From its conception, this fountain was conceived as an allegory of Louis XIV's victory over the Fronde. In 1678, an octagonal ring of turf and eight rocaille fountains surrounding the central fountain were added. These additions were removed in 1708. When in play, this fountain has the tallest jet of all the fountains in the gardens of Versailles – 25 metres (Marie 1968, 1972, 1976, 1984; Thompson 2006; Verlet 1985).

=== Bosquet des Sources – La Colonnade ===
Designed as a simple unadorned salle de verdure by Le Nôtre in 1678, the landscape architect enhanced and incorporated an existing stream to create a bosquet that featured rivulets that twisted among nine islets. In 1684, Jules Hardouin-Mansart completely redesigned the bosquet by constructing a circular arched double peristyle. The Colonnade, as it was renamed, originally featured thirty-two arches and thirty-one fountains – a single jet of water splashed into a basin center under the arch. In 1704, three additional entrances to the Colonnade were added, which reduced the number of fountains from thirty-one to twenty-eight. The statue that now occupies the center of the Colonnade – the Abduction of Persephone – (from the Grande Commande of 1664) was set in place in 1696 (Marie 1968, 1972, 1976, 1984; Thompson 2006; Verlet 1985).

=== Galerie d'Eau – Galerie des Antiques – Salle des Marronniers ===
Occupying the site of the Galerie d'Eau (1678), the Galerie des Antiques was designed in 1680 to house the collection of antique statues and copies of antique statues acquired by the Académie de France in Rome. Surrounding a central area paved with colored stone, a channel was decorated with twenty statues on plinths each separated by three jets of water. The galerie was completely remodeled in 1704 when the statues were transferred to Marly and the bosquet was replanted with horse chestnut trees (Aesculus hippocastanum) – hence the current name Salle des Marronniers (Marie 1968, 1972, 1976, 1984; Thompson 2006; Verlet 1985).

=== Salle de Bal ===
Located west of the Parterre du Midi and south of the Latona Fountain, this bosquet, which was designed by Le Nôtre and built between 1681 and 1683, features a semi-circular cascade that forms the backdrop for this salle de verdure. Interspersed with gilt lead torchères, which supported candelabra for illumination, the Salle de Bal was inaugurated in 1683 by Louis XIV's son, the Grand Dauphin, with a dance party. The Salle de Bal was remodeled in 1707 when the central island was removed and an additional entrance was added (Marie 1968, 1972, 1976, 1984; Thompson 2006; Verlet 1985).

=== Views of the Bosquets ===
Bosquets of the gardens of Versailles: 17th-century views

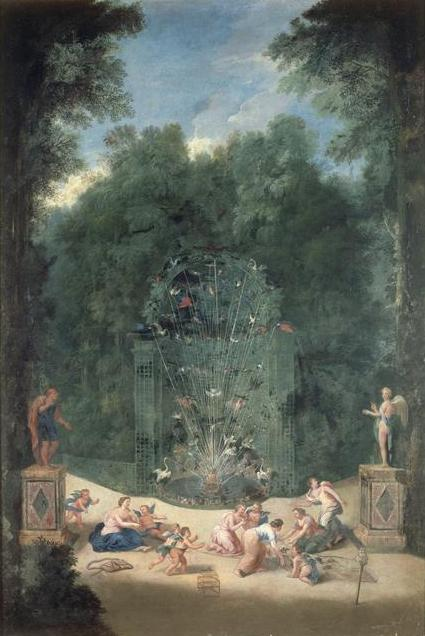
"Entrée du Labyrinthe" by Jean Cotelle, ca. 1693

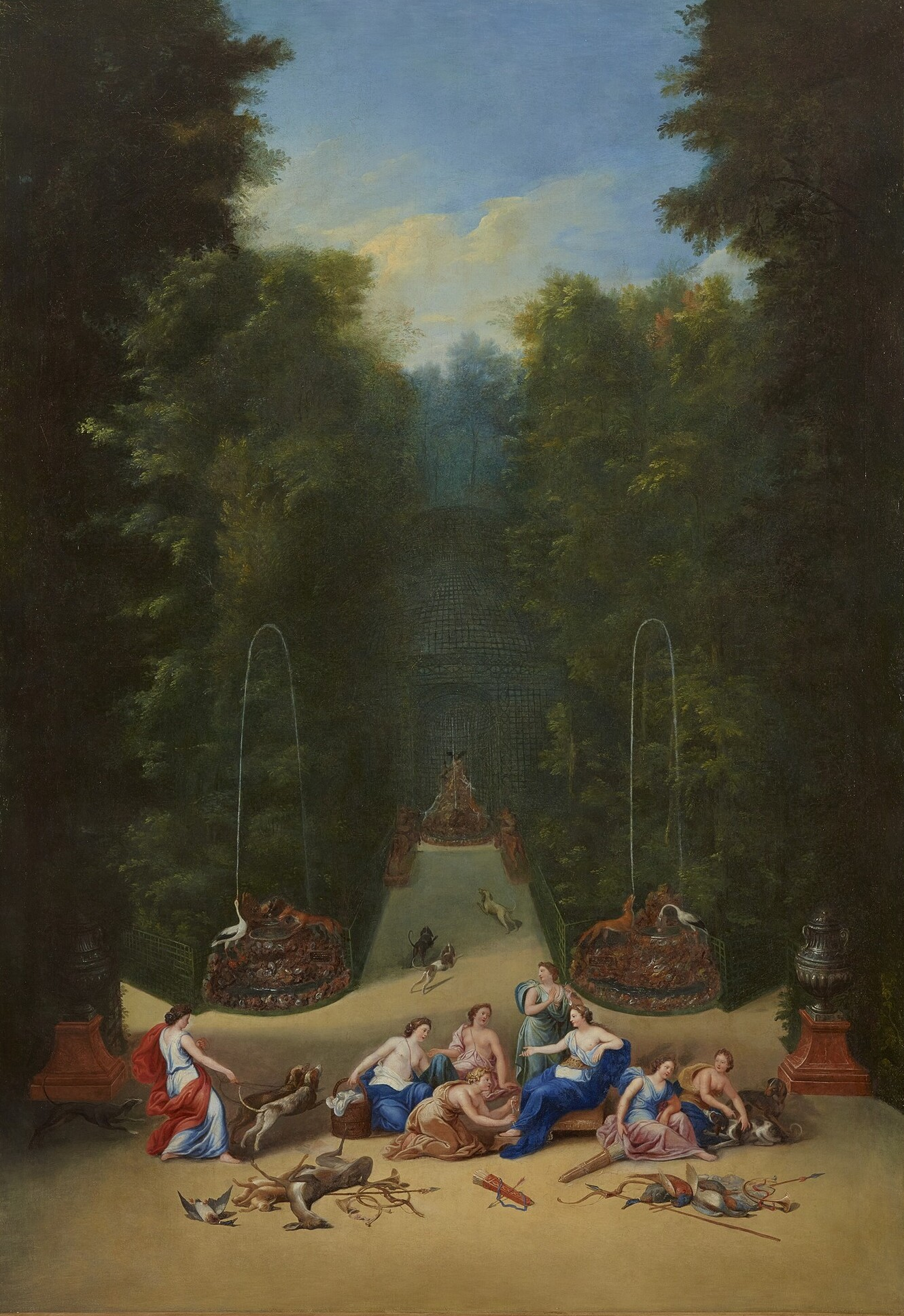
"Vue de l'intérieur du bosquet du Labyrinthe" by Jean Cotelle, ca. 1693

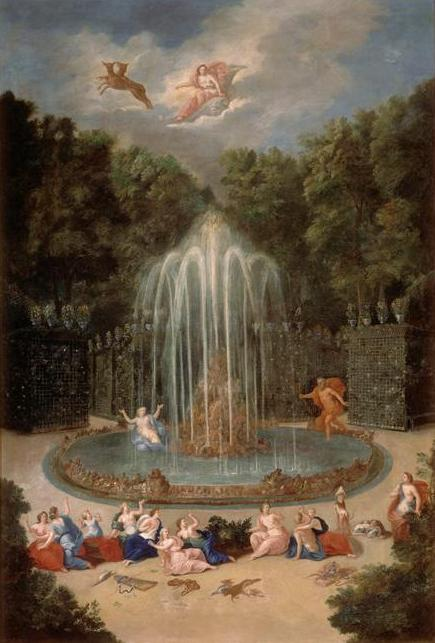
"Bosquet de l'Étoile ou la Montagne d'eau" by Jean Cotelle, ca. 1693

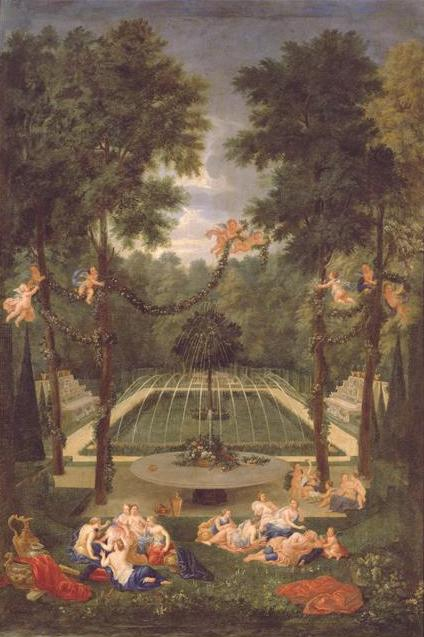
"Bosquet du Marais" by Jean Cotelle, ca. 1693

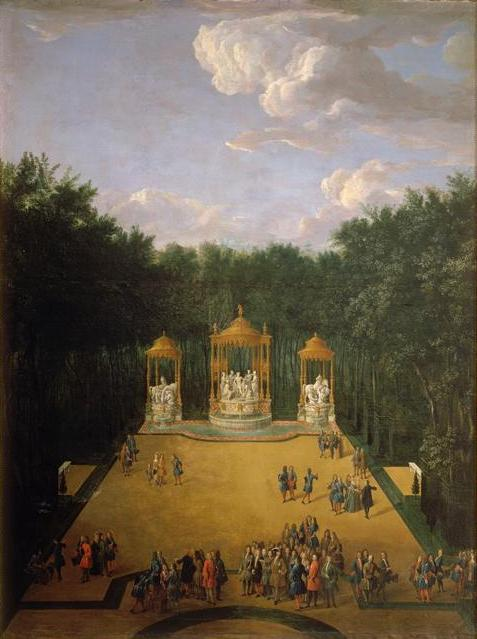
"Bosquet des Bains d'Apollon" by Pierre-Denis Martin (Martin le Jeune), ca. 1713

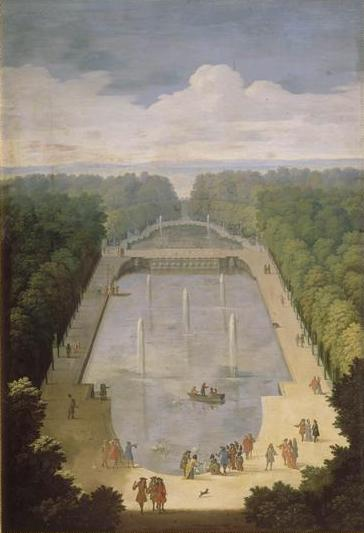
"Bosquet de l'Île Royale et le Bassin du Miroir" by Étienne Allegrain, ca. 1693

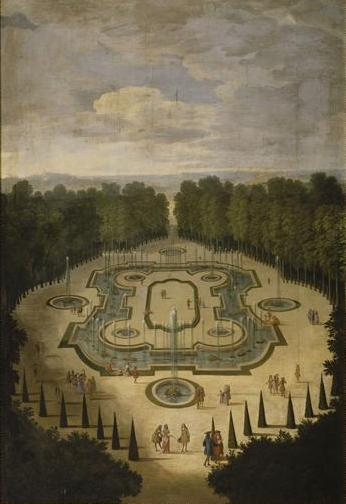
"Salle des Festins ou Salle du Conseil" by Étienne Allegrain, ca. 1688

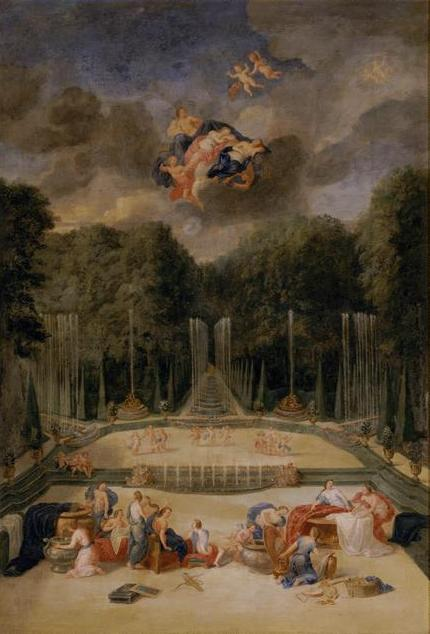
"Le théâtre d'eau-vue de a scène" by Jean Cotelle, ca. 1693

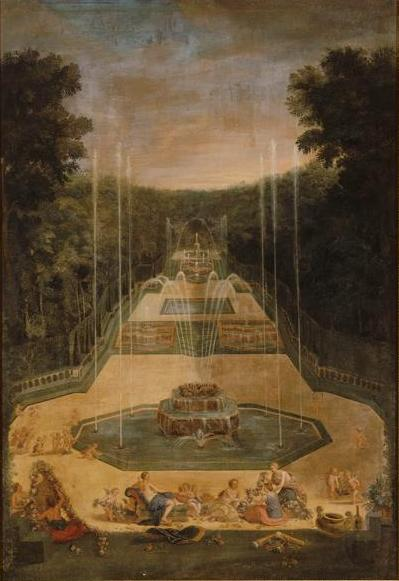
"Bosquet des trois fontaines-vue du côté" by Jean Cotelle, ca. 1693

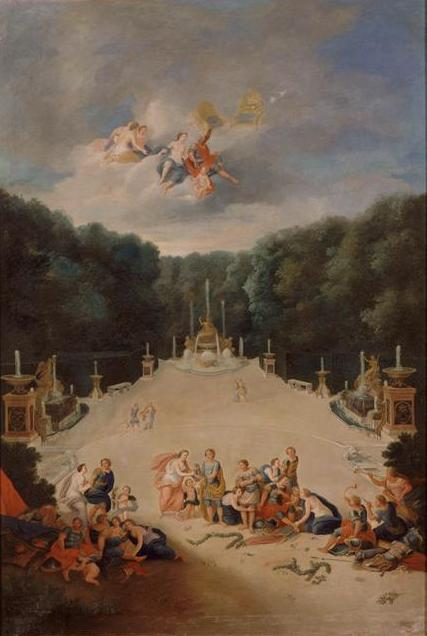
"Bosquet de l'Arc de Triomphe-vue depuis la Salle basse" by Jean Cotelle, ca. 1693

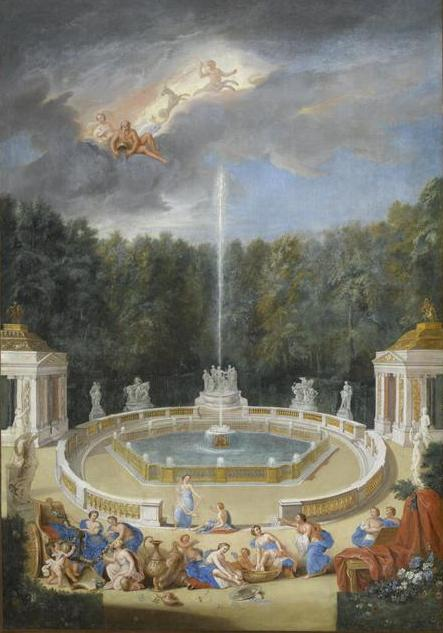
"Bosquet des Dômes" by Jean Cotelle, ca. 1693

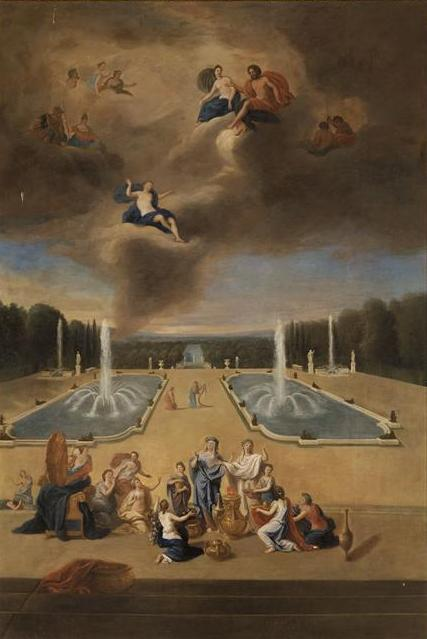
"Parterre d'Eau" by Jean Cotelle, ca. 1693

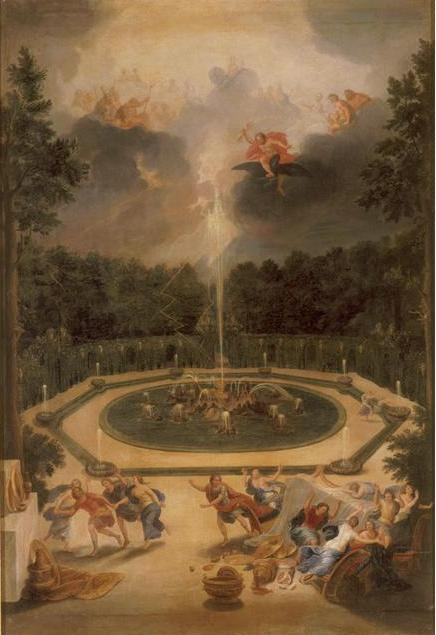
"Bassin de l'Encélade" Jean Cotelle, ca. 1693

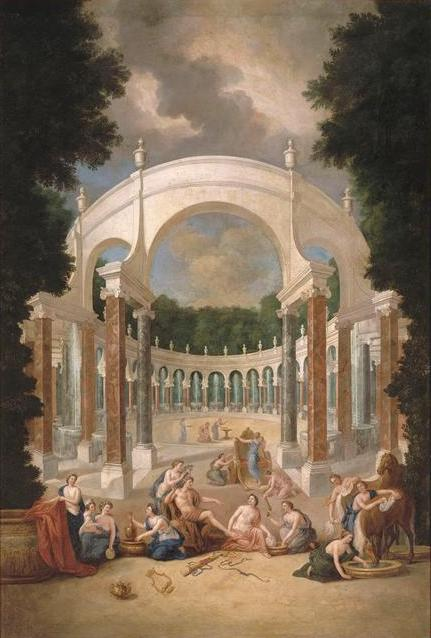
"La Colonnade" by Jean Cotelle, ca. 1693

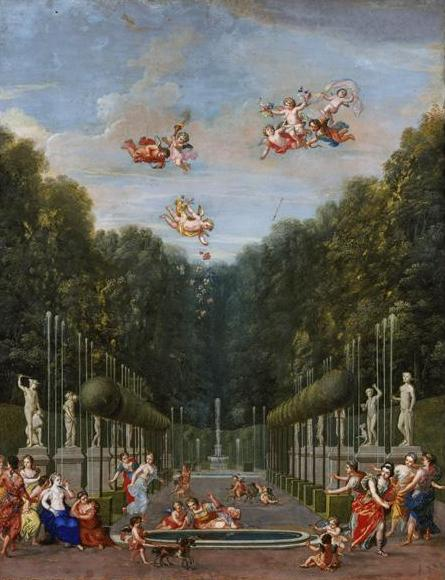
"Galerie des Antiques" by Jean Joubert, ca. 1693

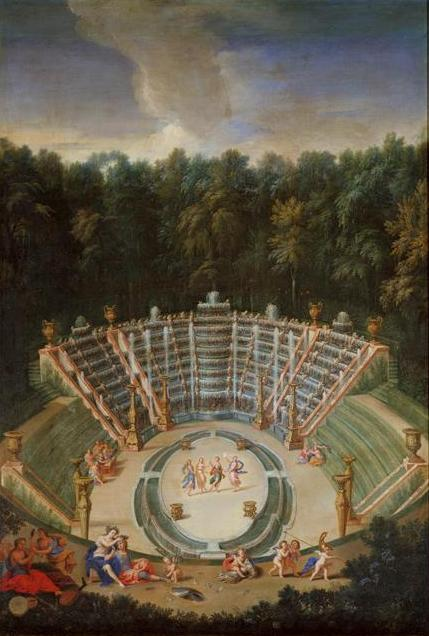
"La Salle de bal" by Jean Cotelle, ca. 1693

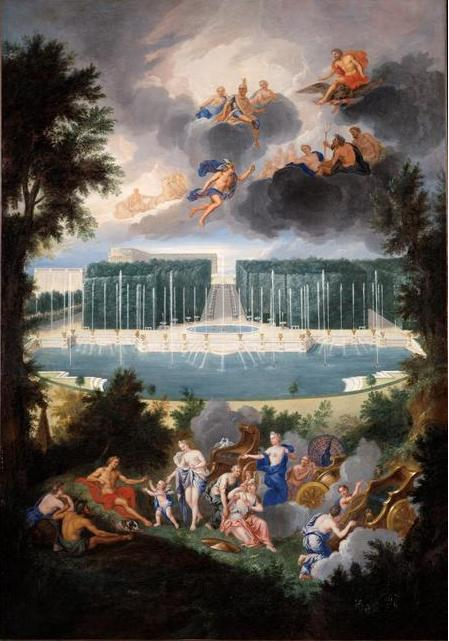
"Bassin de Neptune" by Jean Cotelle, ca. 1693

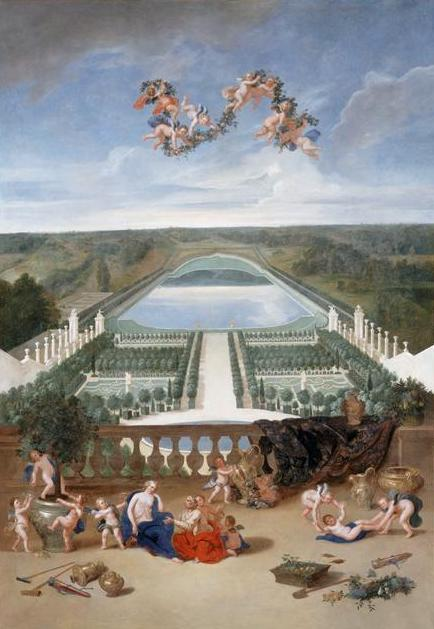
"Vue de l'Orangerie" by Jean Cotelle, ca. 1693

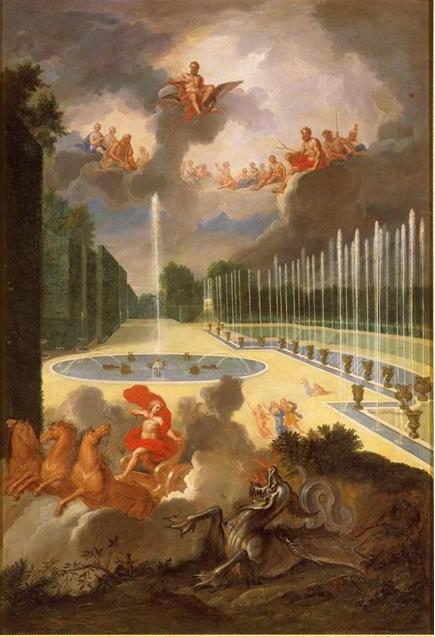
"Bassin du Dragon" by Jean Cotelle, ca. 1693

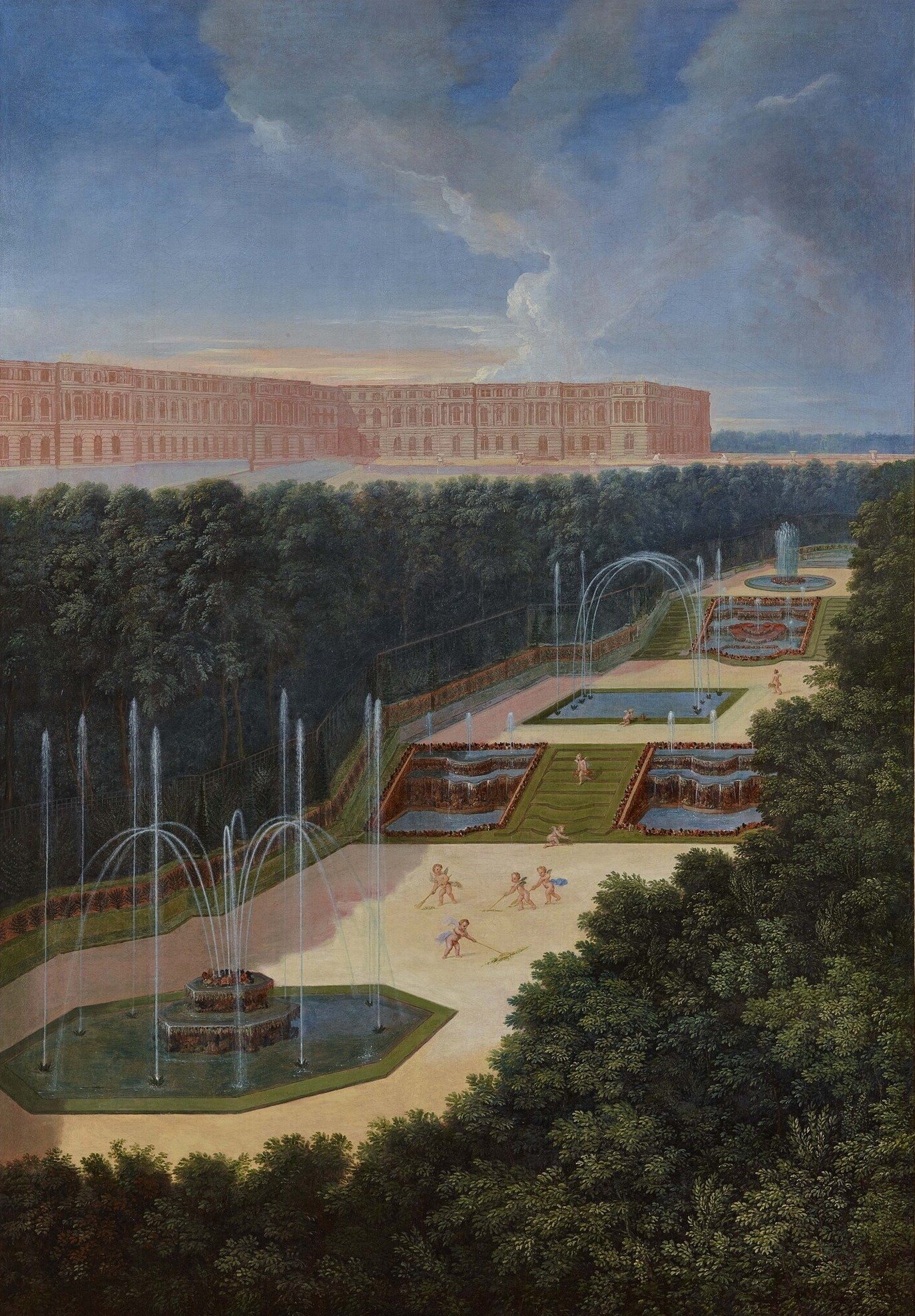
"Bosquet des trois fontaines-vue de face" by Jean Cotelle, ca. 1693

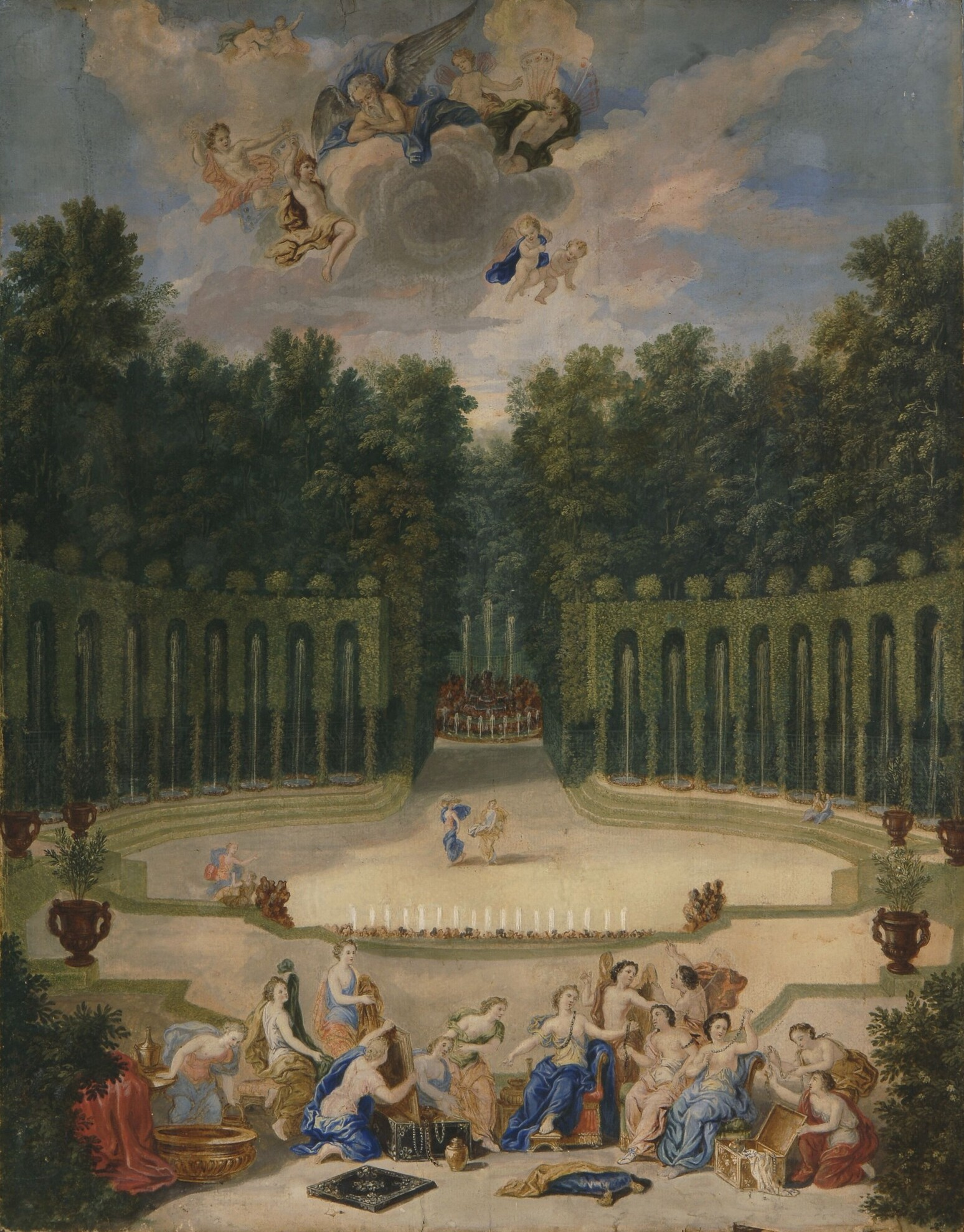
"Le théâtre d'eau-vue de l'amphithéâtre" by Jean Cotelle, ca. 1693

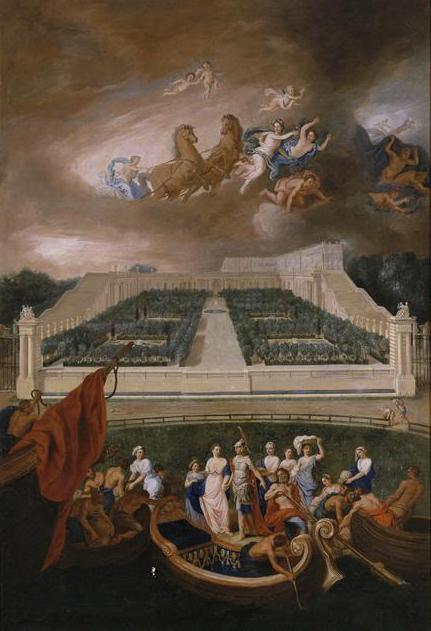
"L'Orangerie" by Jean Cotelle, ca. 1693

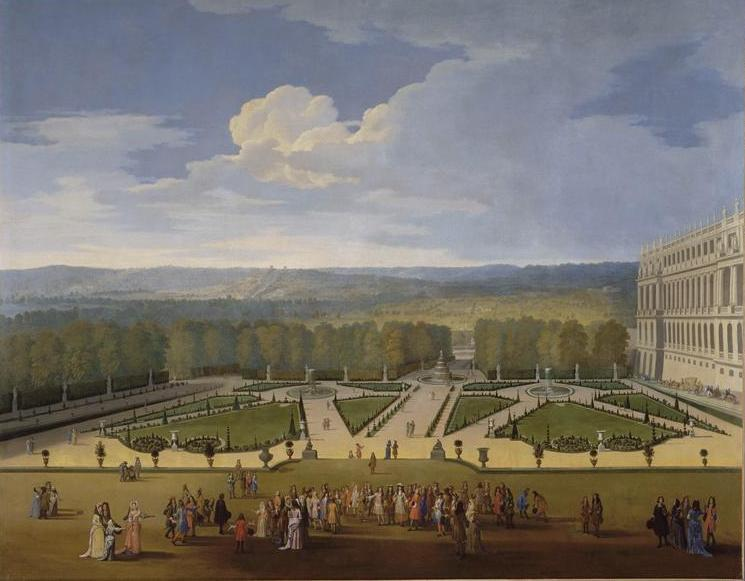
"Parterre du Nord" by Étienne Allegrain, ca. 1693
Modern views of the gardens of Versailles

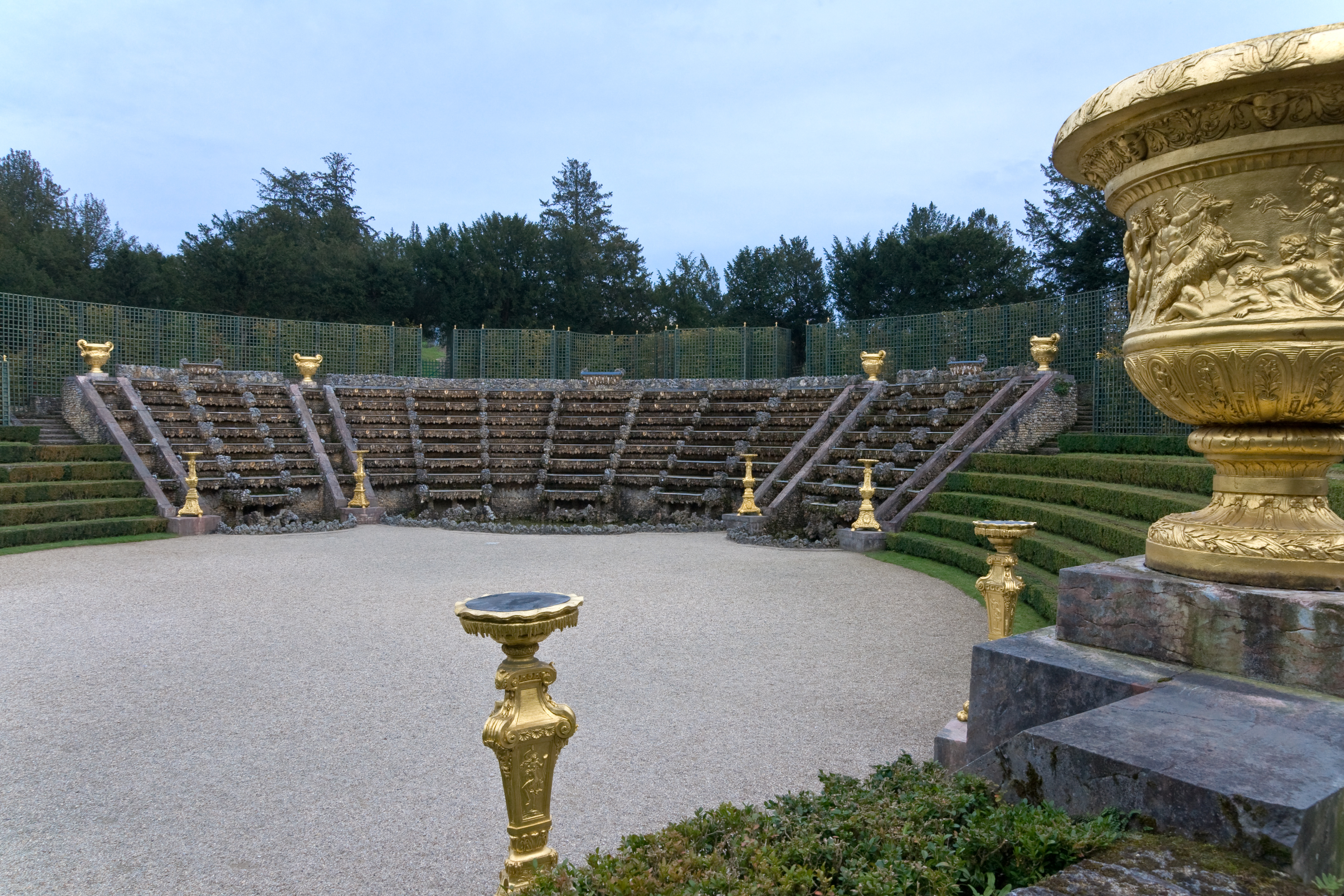
Bosquet of the Salle de Bal, contemporary view.

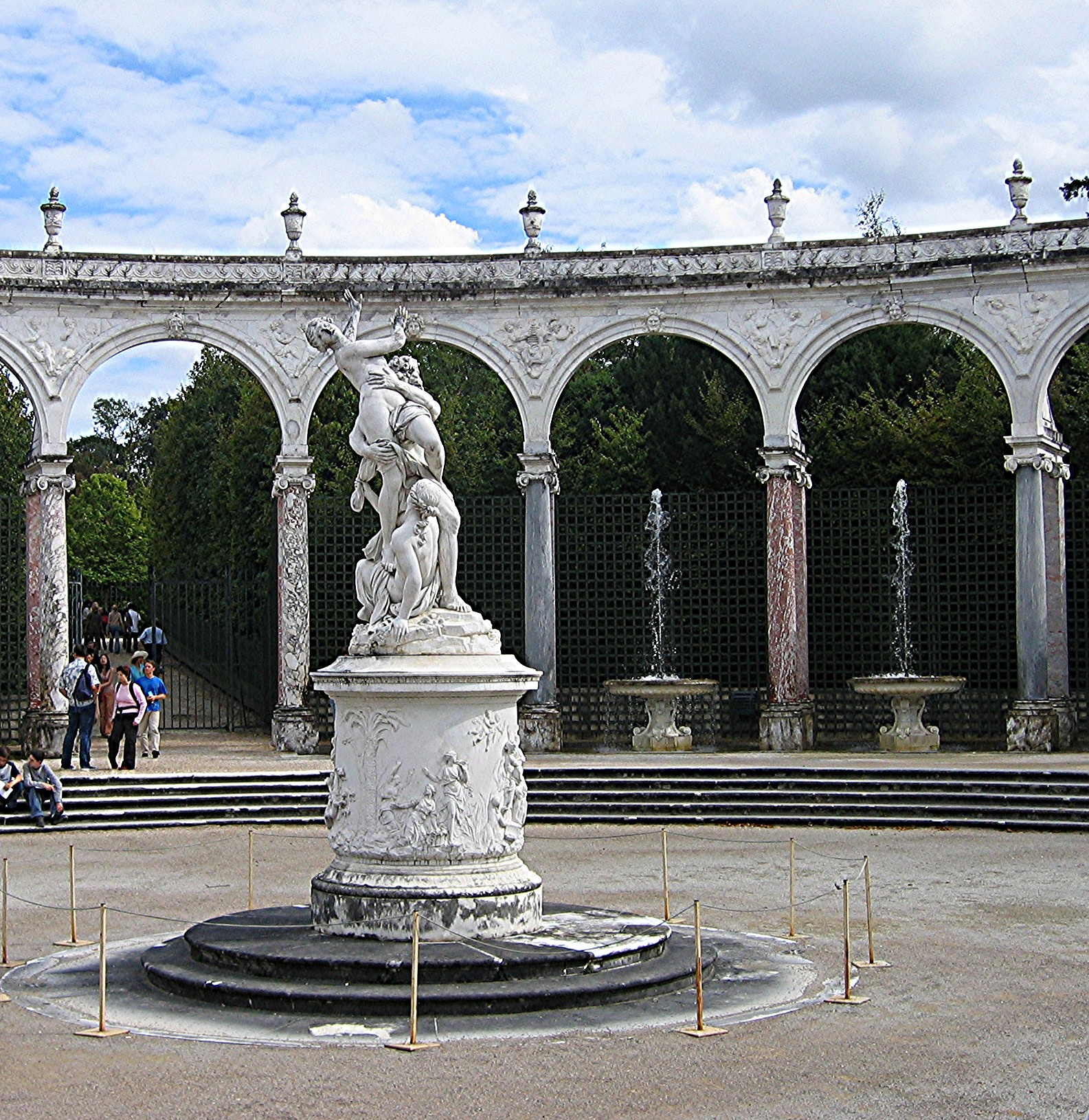
La Colonnade with the "Abduction of Persephone" by François Girardon

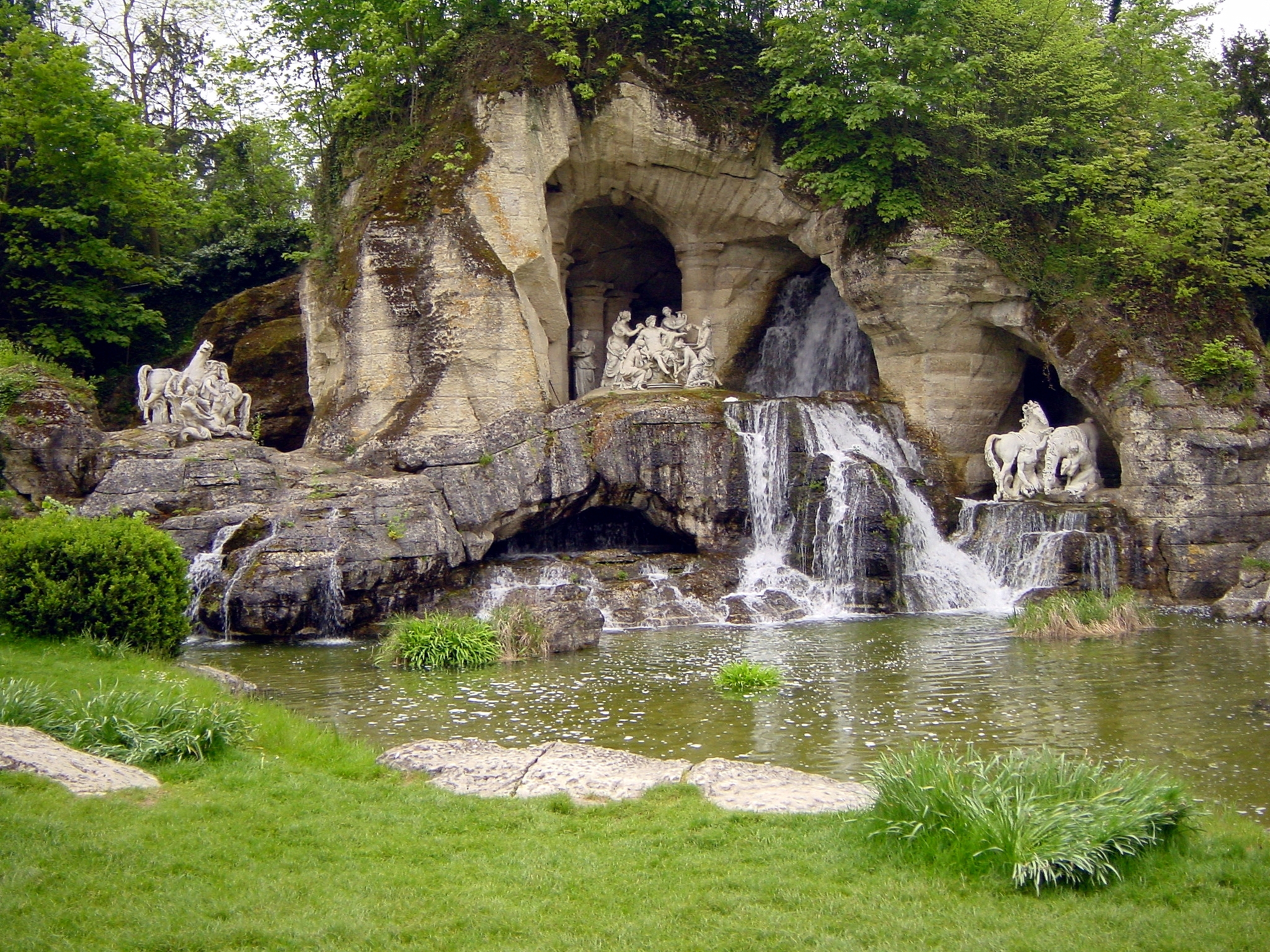
Grotte des Bains d'Apollon, contemporary view.

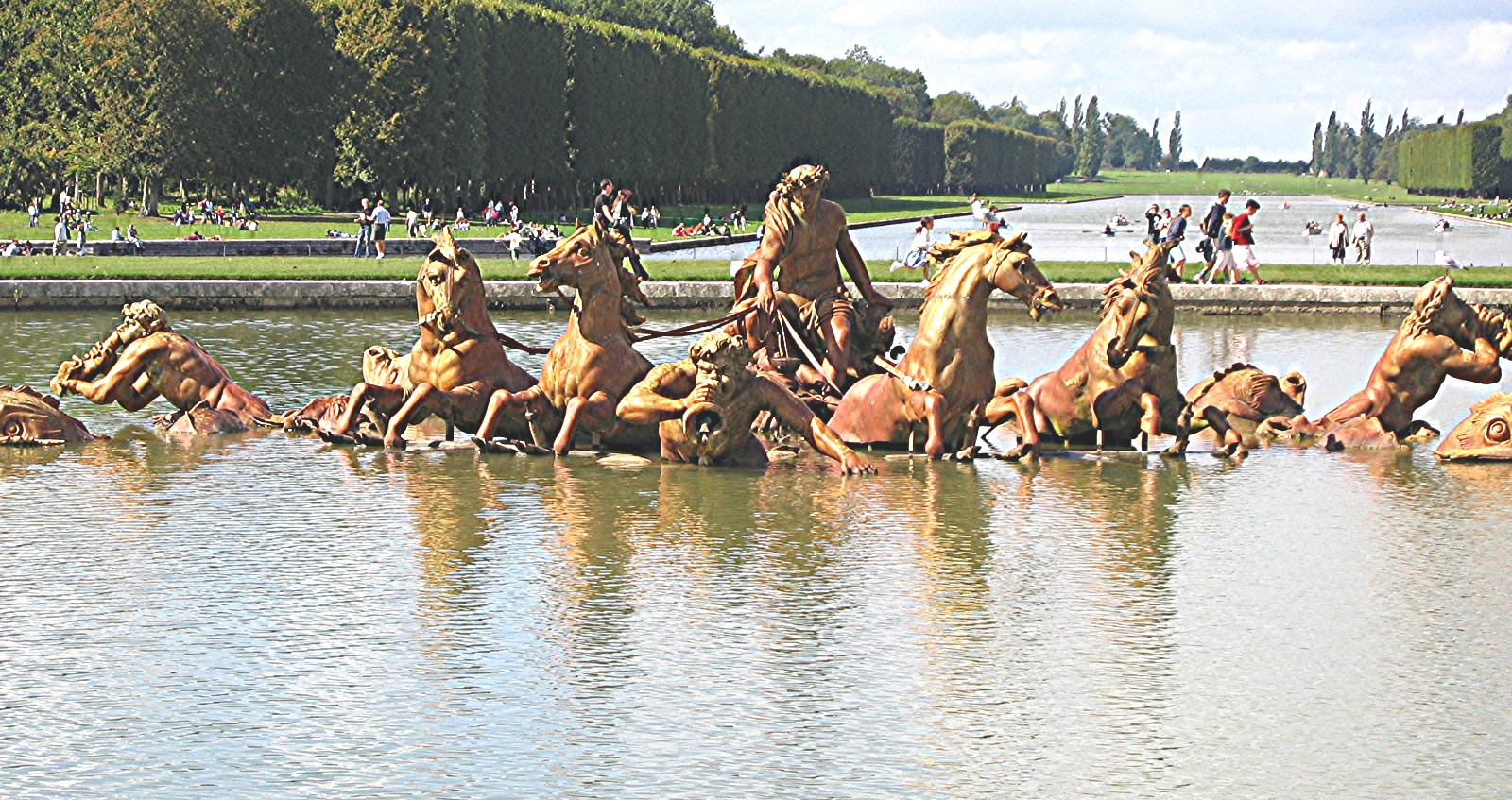
Bassin d'Apollon – Apollo Fountain, contemporary view

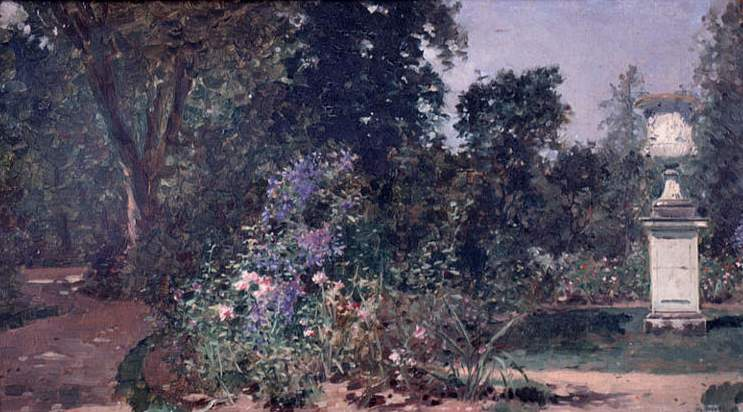
"Versailles, le jardin du Roi" by Raimundo de Madrazo y Garreta, 1914–1920, oil on canvas, 17 x 30 cm, Musée Lambinet

== Replantations of the garden ==
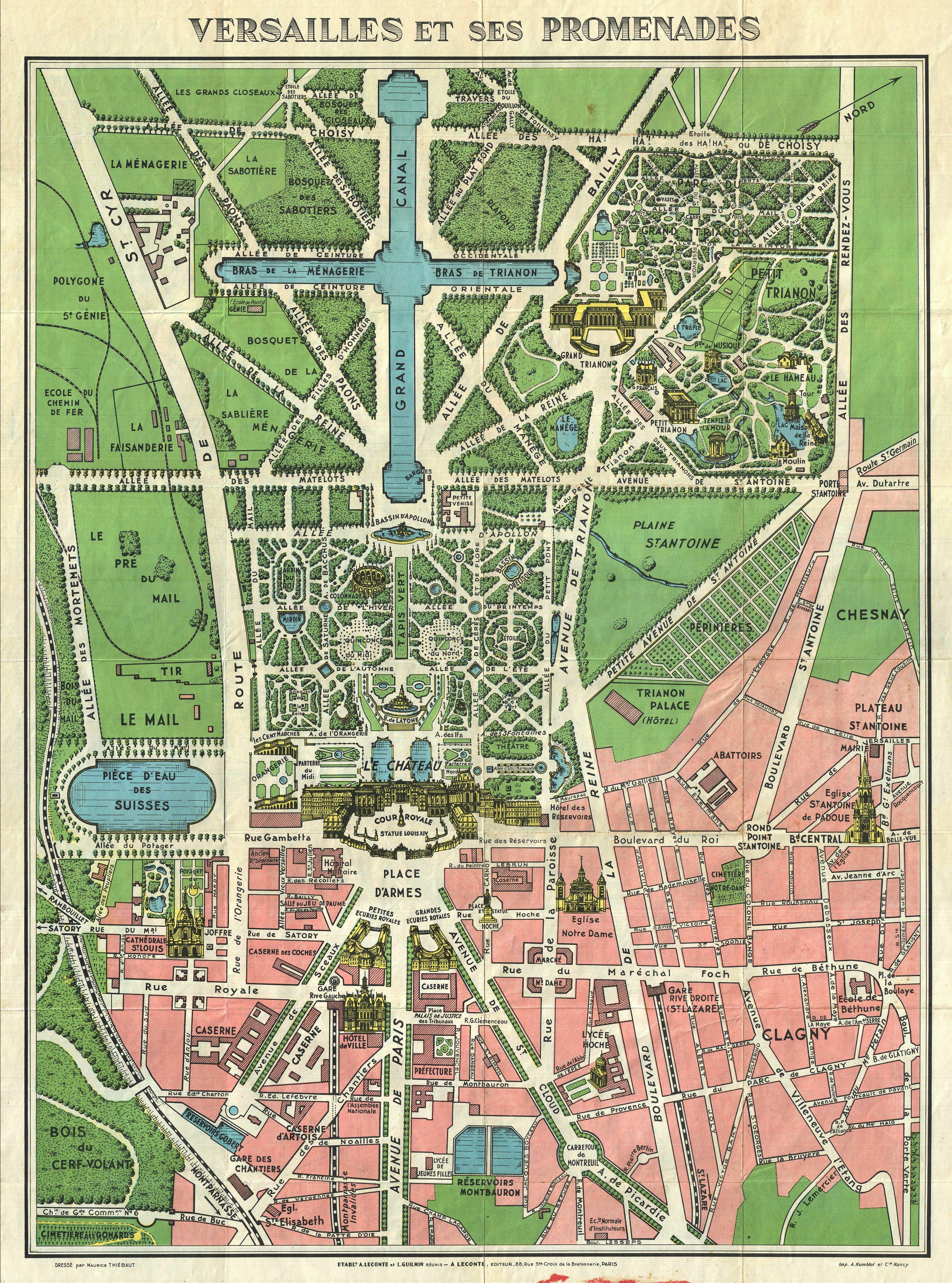
Gardens and palace of Versailles in 1920s

Common to any long-lived garden is replantation, and Versailles is no exception. In their history, the gardens of Versailles have undergone no less than five major replantations, which have been executed for practical and aesthetic reasons.

During the winter of 1774–1775, Louis XVI ordered the replanting of the gardens on the grounds that many of the trees were diseased or overgrown and needed to be replaced. Also, as the formality of the 17th-century garden had fallen out of fashion, this replantation sought to establish a new informality in the gardens – that would also be less expensive to maintain – of Versailles. This, however, was not achieved as the topology of the gardens favored the jardin à la française over an English-style garden. Then, in 1860, much of the old growth from Louis XVI's replanting was removed and replaced. In 1870, a violent storm struck the area damaging and uprooting scores of trees, which necessitated a massive replantation program. However, owing to the Franco-Prussian War, which toppled Napoleon III, and the Commune de Paris, replantation of the garden did not get underway until 1883.

The most recent replantations of the gardens were precipitated by two storms that battered Versailles in 1990 and then again in 1999. The storm damage at Versailles and Trianon amounted to the loss of thousands of trees – the worst such damage in the history of Versailles. The replantations have allowed museum and governmental authorities to restore and rebuild some of the bosquets abandoned during the reign of Louis XVI, such as the Bosquet des Trois Fontaines, which was restored in 2004.

Catherine Pégard, the head of the public establishment which administers Versailles, has stated that the intention is to return the gardens to their appearance under Louis XIV, specifically as he described them in his 1704 description, Manière de Montrer les Jardins de Versailles. This involves restoring some of the parterres like the Parterre du Midi to their original formal layout, as they appeared under Le Nôtre. This was achieved in the Parterre de Latone in 2013, when the 19th century lawns and flower beds were replaced with boxwood-enclosed turf and gravel paths to create a formal arabesque design. Pruning is also done to keep trees between 17 and 23 metres (56 to 75 feet) tall, so as not to spoil the carefully calibrated perspectives of the gardens.

Owing to the cycle of replantations that has occurred at Versailles, it is safe to state that no trees dating from the time of Louis XIV are to be found in the gardens.

== Water Problems ==
A prominent element of the gardens of Versailles is its many fountains. Yet these have led to problems with water since the time of Louis XIV.

The gardens of Louis XIII required water and local ponds provided an adequate supply. However, once Louis XIV began expanding the gardens with more and more fountains, supplying the gardens with water became a critical challenge.

To meet the needs of the early expansions of the gardens under Louis XIV, water was pumped to gardens from ponds near the château, with the Clagny pond serving as the principal source. Water from the pond was pumped to the reservoir on top of the Grotte de Thétys, which fed the fountains in the garden by means of gravitational hydraulics. Other sources included a series of reservoirs located on the Satory Plateau south of the château (Verlet, 1985).

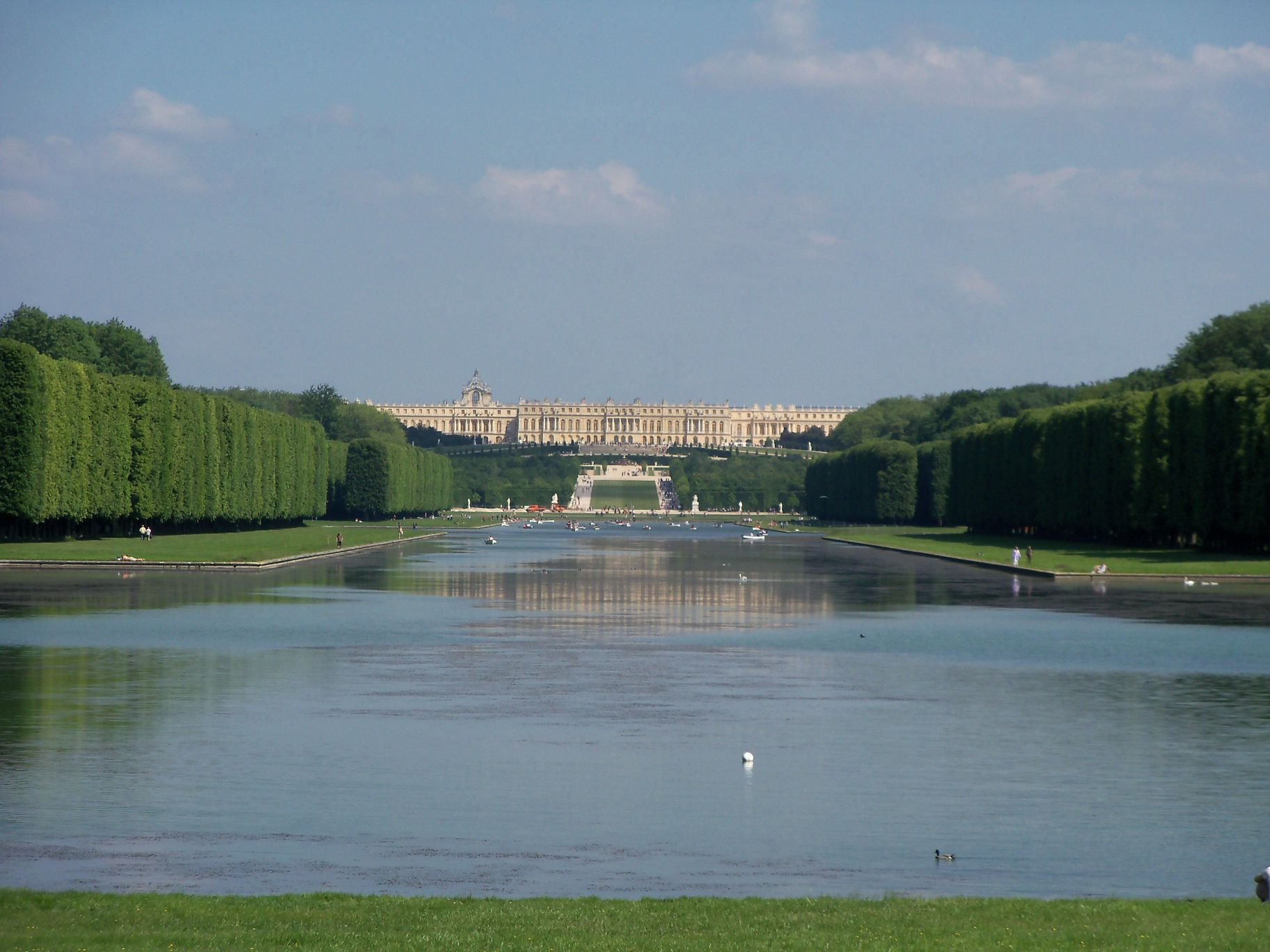
The Grand Canal

By 1664, increased demand for water necessitated additional sources. In that year, Louis Le Vau designed the Pompe, a water tower built north of the château. The Pompe drew water from the Clagny pond using a system of windmills and horsepower to a cistern housed in the Pompe's building. The capacity of the Pompe – 600 m^{3} (21,000 cu ft) of water per day – alleviated some of the water shortages in the garden.

With the completion of the Grand Canal in 1671, which served as drainage for the fountains of the garden, water, via a system of windmills, was pumped back to the reservoir on top of the Grotte de Thétys. While this system solved some of the water supply problems, there was never enough water to keep all of the fountains running in the garden in full-play all of the time.

While it was possible to keep the fountains in view from the château running, those concealed in the bosquets and in the farther reaches of the garden were run on an as-needed basis. In 1672, Jean-Baptiste Colbert devised a system by which the fountaineers in the garden would signal each other with whistles upon the approach of the king indicating that their fountain needed to be turned on. Once the king passed a fountain in play, it would be turned off and the fountaineer would signal that the next fountain could be turned on.

In 1674, the Pompe was enlarged – hence referred to as the Grande Pompe. Pumping capacity was increased via increased power and the number of pistons used for lifting the water. These improvements increased the water capacity to nearly 3,000 m^{3} (110,000 cu ft) of water per day; however, the increased capacity of the Grande Pompe often left the Clagny pond dry.

The increasing demand for water and the stress placed on existing systems of water supply necessitated newer measures to increase the water supplied to Versailles. Between 1668 and 1674, a project was undertaken to divert the water of the Bièvre river to Versailles. By damming the river and with a pumping system of five windmills, water was brought to the reservoirs located on the Satory Plateau. This system brought an additional 72,000 m^{3} (2,500,000 cu ft) of water to the gardens.

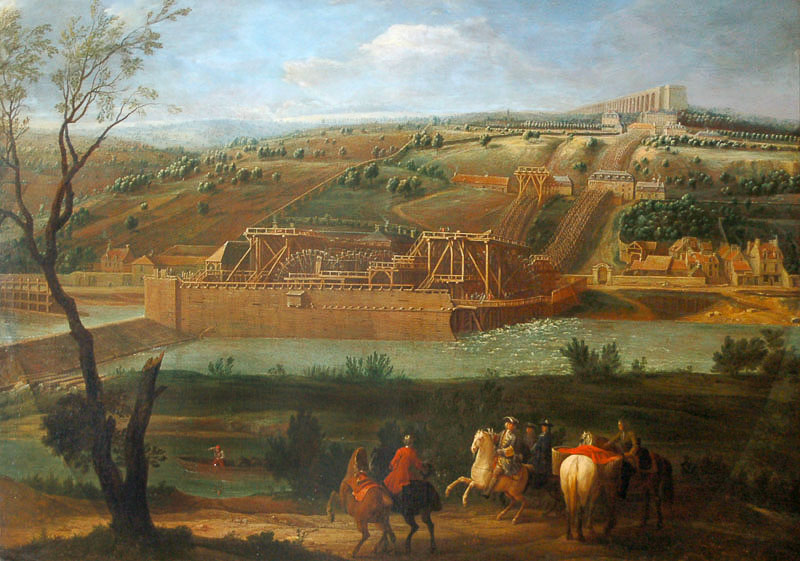
Vue de la Machine de Marly (1723) by Pierre-Denis Martin, showing the Machine de Marly on the Seine, the Louveciennes hillside, and in the background to the right, the aqueduc de Louveciennes to which the water was pumped by the Machine

Despite the augmentation of water from the Bièvre, the gardens needed still more water, which necessitated more projects. In 1681, one of the most ambitious water projects conceived during the reign of Louis XIV was undertaken. Owing to the proximity of the Seine to Versailles, a project was proposed to raise the water from the river to be delivered to Versailles. Seizing upon the success of a system devised in 1680 that raised water from the Seine to the gardens of Saint-Germain-en-Laye, construction of the Machine de Marly began the following year.

The Machine de Marly was designed to lift water from the Seine in three stages to the aqueduc de Louveciennes some 100 m (330 ft) above the level of the river. A series of huge waterwheels was constructed in the river, which raised the water via a system of 64 pumps to a reservoir 48 m (157 ft) above the river. From this first reservoir, water was raised an additional 56 m (184 ft) to a second reservoir by a system of 79 pumps. Finally, 78 additional pumps raised the water to the aqueduct, which carried the water to Versailles and Marly.

In 1685, the Machine de Marly came into full operation. However, owing to leakage in the conduits and breakdowns of the mechanism, the machine was only able to deliver 3,200 m^{3} (110,000 cu ft) of water per day – approximately one-half the expected output. The machine was a must-see for visitors to France. Despite the fact that the gardens consumed more water per day than the entire city of Paris, the Machine de Marly remained in operation until 1817.

During Louis XIV's reign, water supply systems represented one-third of the building costs of Versailles. Even with the additional output from the Machine de Marly, fountains in the garden could only be run à l'ordinaire – which is to say at half-pressure. With this measure of economy, fountains still consumed 12,800 m^{3} (450,000 cu ft) of water per day, far above the capacity of the existing supplies. In the case of the Grandes Eaux – when all the fountains played to their maximum – more than 10,000 m^{3} (350,000 cu ft) of water was needed for one afternoon's display. Accordingly, the Grandes Eaux were reserved for special occasions such as the Siamese Embassy of 1685–1686.

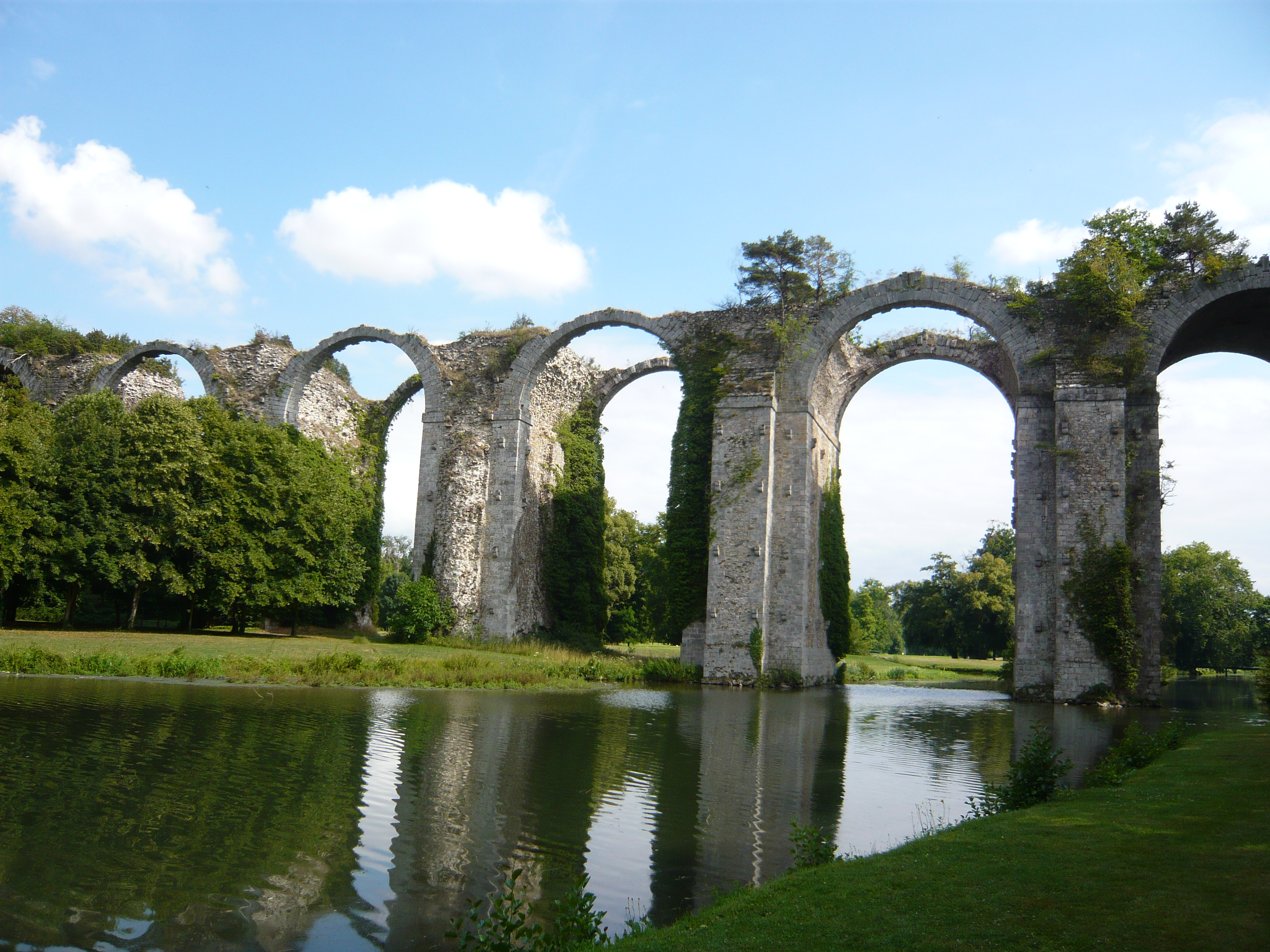
Canal de l'Eure

One final attempt to solve water shortage problems was undertaken in 1685. In this year it was proposed to divert the water of the Eure river, located 160 km (99 mi) south of Versailles and at a level 26 m (85 ft) above the garden reservoirs. The project called not only for digging a canal and for the construction of an aqueduct, it also necessitated the construction of shipping channels and locks to supply the workers on the main canal. Between 9,000 and 10,000 troops were pressed in service in 1685; the next year, more than 20,000 soldiers were engaged in construction. Between 1686 and 1689, when the Nine Years' War began, one-tenth of France's military was at work on the Canal de l'Eure project. With the outbreak of the war, the project was abandoned, never to be completed. Had the aqueduct been completed, some 50,000 m^{3} (1,800,000 cu ft) of water would have been sent to Versailles – more than enough to solve the water problem of the gardens.

Today, the museum of Versailles is still faced with water problems. During the Grandes Eaux, water is circulated by means of modern pumps from the Grand Canal to the reservoirs. Replenishment of the water lost due to evaporation comes from rainwater, which is collected in cisterns that are located throughout the gardens and diverted to the reservoirs and the Grand Canal. Assiduous husbanding of this resource by museum officials prevents tapping into the supply of potable water of the city of Versailles.

== In popular culture ==
The creation of the gardens of Versailles is the context for the film A Little Chaos, directed by Alan Rickman and released in 2015, in which Kate Winslet plays a fictional landscape gardener, Matthias Schoenaerts plays André Le Nôtre and Rickman plays King Louis XIV.

== See also ==
- Potager du roi (Kitchen Garden of the King)
- History of the Palace of Versailles

== Sources ==
The following are sources that have contributed to the above article. It is not an exhaustive list, yet it represents the most readily available imprints:

- Anonymous. Description du chasteau de Versailles. (Paris: A. Vilette, 1685).
- Berger, R. W. In the Gardens of the Sun King: Studies on the Park of Versailles Under Louis XIV. (Washington, 1985).
- Berger, Robert W. "Les guides imprimés de Versailles sous Louis XIV et le œuvres d'art allégoriques." Colloque de Versailles (1985).
- Berger, Robert W. "A Source for the Latona Group at Versailles." Gazette des Beaux-Arts 6 pér., vol. 119 (avril 1992): 145–148.
- Börtz-Laine, Agenta. "Un grand pavillon d'Apollon pour Versailles: les origines du projet de Nicodème Tessin le jeun." Colloque de Versailles (1985).
- Bottineau, Yves. "Essais sur le Versailles de Louis XIV I: La distribution du château Versailles, le plan du domaine et de la ville." Gazette des Beaux-Arts 6 pér., vol. 112 (septembre 1988): 77–89.
- Dangeau, Philippe de Courcillon, marquis de. Journal. (Paris, 1854–60).
- Desjardins, Gustave Adolphe (1885). Le Petit-Trianon: histoire et description. Versailles: L. Bernard, Libraire-Editeur.
- Félibien, André. Description sommaire du chasteau de Versailles. (Paris, 1674).
- Félibien, Jean-François. Description sommaire de Versailles ancienne et nouvelle. (Paris, 1703).
- Fennebresque, Juste. "Construction projetée sous Louis XIV à Versailles d'un pavillon d'Apollon." Revue de l'Histoire de Versailles (1902): 91–100.
- Francastle, Pierre. La Sculpture de Versailles. (Paris: Maison des Sciences de l'Homme, 1970).
- Friedman, Ann. "The evolution of the Parterre d'eau." Journal of Garden History vol. 8, no. 1 (January–March 1988): 1–30.
- Friedman, Ann. "Charles Le Brun as Landscape Architect: His Designs for the First Parterre d'eau at Versailles." Eighteenth Century Life vol. 17, n.s., 2 (May 1993): 24–35.
- Girard, Jacques. Versailles gardens: sculpture and mythology. Preface by Pierre Lemoine. (New York: Vendôme Press, 1983).
- Hazlehurst, Franklin Hamilton. Gardens of Illusion. (Nashville, Tennessee: Vanderbilt University Press, 1980). ISBN 9780826512093.
- Hedin, Thomas. "The Parterre d'eau at Versailles: an eighteenth-century recollection." Minneapolis Institute of Arts Bulletin 65 (1981–1982): 50–65.
- Hedin, Thomas. "Versailles and the 'Mercure Gallant': The Promenade of the Siamese Ambassadors." Gazette des Beaux-Arts 6 pér., vol. 119 (avril 1992): 149–172.
- Hoog, Simone. "Sur la restauration de quelques sculptures du parc du Versailles." Monuments historiques de la France 138 (April–May 1985): 50–56.
- Hoog, Simone. Louis XIV: Manière de montrer les jardins de Versailles. (Paris: Éditions de la Réunion des musées nationaux, 1982).
- Lighthart, Edward. "Archétype et symbole dans le style Louis XIV versaillais: réflexions sur l'imago rex et l'imago patriae au début de l'époque moderne." (Doctoral thesis, 1997)
- Loach, J. "Le labyrinthe et l'esprit du XVIIe." Colloque de Versailles (1985).
- Louis XIV. Guide de Versailles. ed. Pierre Jaquillard. (Lyon: Courrier de La Cote, n.d).
- Louis XIV. Mémoires. ed. Charles Dreyss. (Paris: Didier et Cie, 1860).
- Mâle, Émile. "Le clef des allégories peintes et sculptées de Versailles." Revue de l'Histoire de Versailles (1927): 73 82.
- Marriage, Thierry. "L'univers de Le Nostre et les origines de l'aménagement du territoire." Monuments historiques de la France 143 (février-mars 1986): 8–13.
- Marie, Alfred. Naissance de Versailles. (Paris, 1968).
- Marie, Alfred & Jeanne. Mansart à Versailles. (Paris, 1972).
- Marie, Alfred & Jeanne. Versailles au temps de Louis XIV. (Paris, 1976).
- Marie, Alfred & Jeanne. Versailles au temps de Louis XV. (Paris:, 1984).
- Marquis de Sourches. Mémoires sur le règne de Louis XIV. Ed. Cosnac & Pontel, 13 vol. (Paris, 1882–93).
- Mecure Galant, septembre 1686.
- Monicart, Jean-Baptiste de. Versailles immortalisé. (Paris: E. Ganeau, 1720).
- Nolhac, Pierre de. La création de Versailles. (Versailles, 1901).
- Nolhac, Pierre de. "L'orangerie de Mansart à Versailles." Revue de l'Histoire de Versailles (1902): 81–90.
- Nolhac, Pierre de. Les dernières Constructions de Le Vau à Versailles. (Versailles : L. Bernard, 1899).
- Nolhac, Pierre de. Versailles, Résidence de Louis XIV. (Paris, 1925).
- Perrault, Charles. Labyrinthe de Versailles. (Paris, 1669).
- Piganiole de la Force. Nouvelle description des chasteaux et parcs de Versailles et Marly. (Paris, 1701)
- Pinatel, Christine. "Un dessin révèle l'origine d'un marbre antique du parc de Versailles." Revue du Louvre 35/1 (1985): 1–8.
- Princesse Palatine, duchess d'Orléans. Lettres de Madame, duchesse d'Orléans. (Paris, 1981).
- Saint-Simon, Louis de Rouvoy, duc de. Memoires. 7 vols. (Paris, 1953–61).
- Scudéry, Madeleine de. La promenade de Versailles. (Paris, 1669).
- Souchal, François. "Les statues aux façades du château de Versailles." Gazette des Beaux-Arts 6 pér., vol. 79 (février 1972): 65–110.
- Thompson, Ian. The Sun King's Garden: Louis XIV, André Le Nôtre and the Creation of the Gardens of Versailles. (London, 2006).
- Verlet, Pierre. Le château de Versailles. (Paris: Librairie Arthème Fayard, 1985).
- Verlet, Pierre. Versailles. (Paris: Librairie Arthème Fayard, 1961).
- Waltisperger, Chantal. "La clôture du grand parc de Versailles." Revue de l'Art 65 (1984): 14–17.
- Weber, Gerold. "Charles LeBrun: Recueil des divers dessins de fontaines." Münchner Jahrbuch der bildenden Kunst (1981): 151–181.
- Weber, Gerold. "Ein Kascadenprojekt für Versailles." Zeitschrift für Kunstgeschicte Band 37, Heft 3/4 (1974): 248–268.
- Weber, Gerold. "Réflexions sur la genèse du jardin français classique et de son décor." Eighteenth Century Life vol. 17, n.s., 2 (May 1993): 1–23.
- Wiebenson, Dora. "Commentaires anglais du XVIIe siècle sur le parc de Versailles." Colloque de Versailles (1985).
- Hedin, Thomas F. (2022), The Fountain of Latona: Louis XIV, Charles Le Brun, and the Gardens of Versailles, University of Pennsylvania Press. ISBN 978-0-8122-5375-7
