= Charles Soubre =

Belgian artist (1821-1895)

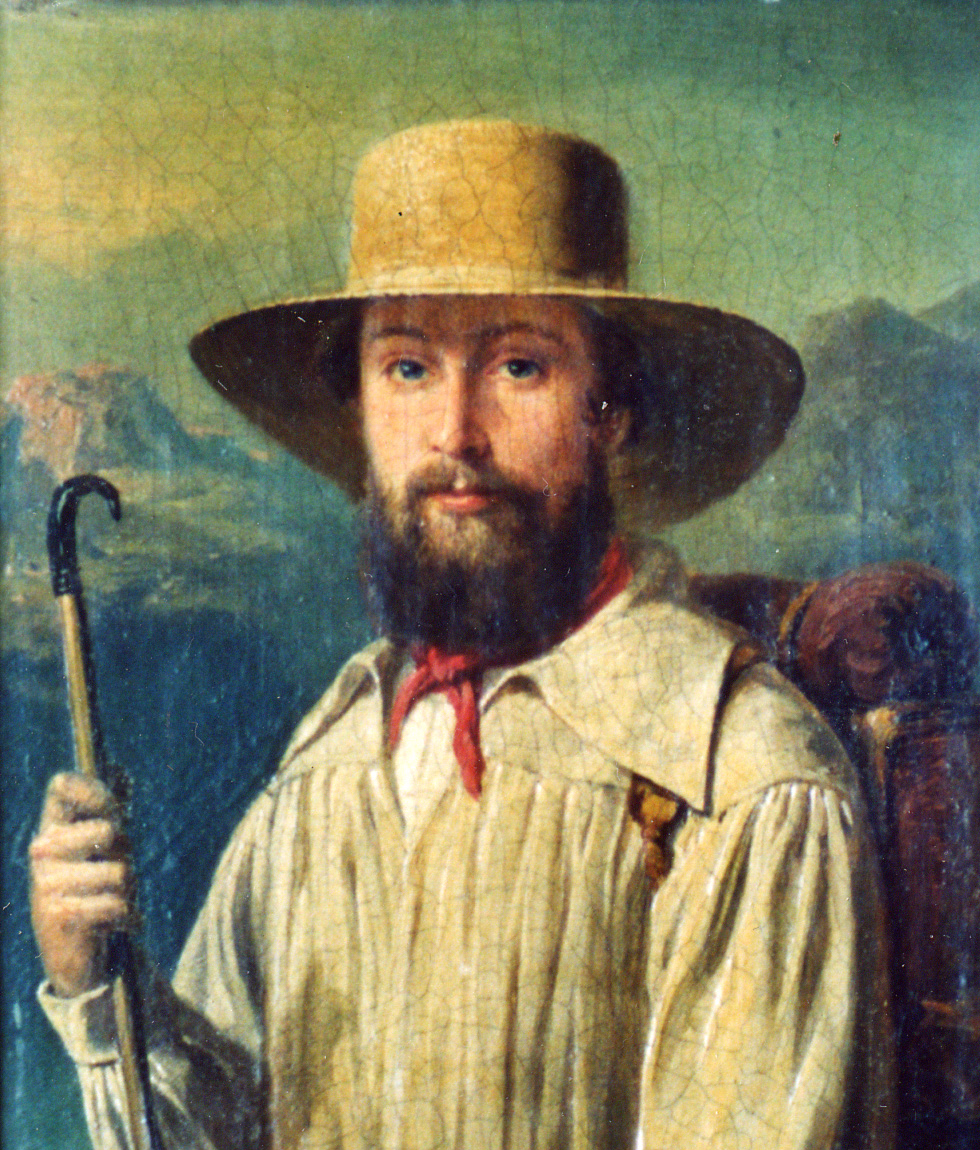
- Self-portrait
- Born: Charles Joseph Soubre; 4 February 1821; Liège, Belgium
- Died: 29 January 1895 (aged 73); Liège, Belgium
- Education: Académie royale des beaux-arts de Liège; Royal Academy of Fine Arts, Brussels
- Known for: History painting
- Notable work: Death of Henry IV, German Emperor (1850); Victor Pisani (1866); Proud Humility (1871); A Noble Family Before the Council of Troubles (1873); La Måle Saint-Martin (1876); The Departure of the Liège Volunteers for Brussels Led by Charles Rogier (1878)
- Awards: Gold medal, 1866 Brussels Salon; Knight, Order of Leopold (1879)

Charles Joseph Soubre (4 February 1821 – 29 January 1895) was a Belgian history painter and drawing professor at the Royal Academy of Fine Arts of Liège.

Soubre trained from 1834 in the studio of the landscape painter Jules Van Marcke, then at the Liège academy under Barthélemy Vieillevoye and Gilles-François Closson, and finally at the Royal Academy of Fine Arts, Brussels. He supported his studies by giving lessons. In 1853 he was appointed professor of drawing at the Liège academy, beginning a teaching career that lasted 35 years. He retired with the title of honorary professor.

Soubre worked primarily as a history painter, drawing subjects from local history and legend, but also produced genre scenes, portraits, landscapes, and female nudes. His major historical canvases include Death of Henry IV, German Emperor (1850), A Noble Family Before the Council of Troubles (1873), La Måle Saint-Martin (1876), and The Departure of the Liège Volunteers for Brussels Led by Charles Rogier (1878). By the end of his life his kind of large-scale historical composition had fallen out of fashion, though his plein air landscapes, marked by balanced composition and decorative synthesis, continued to be valued.

Soubre exhibited extensively: sixteen times at the Brussels Salon between 1839 and 1884, nine times at the Antwerp Salon, ten times at the Ghent Salon, and at international events including the Paris Salon (1861, 1863), the London International Exhibitions (1872–1874), the Vienna World's Fair (1873), the Philadelphia Centennial Exposition (1876), and the Sydney International Exhibition (1879–1880). He received a gold medal at the 1866 Brussels Salon for Victor Pisani and a bronze medal at Sydney.

== Biography ==
=== Early life and training ===
Charles Joseph Soubre was born on 4 February 1821 in Liège. His father, Jean Joseph Soubre (1788–1864), was a music dealer; his mother was Marie Françoise Hubertine Thiriard (1791–1861). His brother Étienne Soubre became a composer.

In 1834 Soubre began studying in the studio of the landscape painter Jules Van Marcke. From 1837 to 1843 he attended the Liège Academy of Fine Arts, where his teachers included Barthélemy Vieillevoye, Gilles-François Closson, Lambert Herman, and Auguste Chauvin. He won first prizes for painting and historical composition there, and supported himself by giving lessons. He completed his training at the Royal Academy of Fine Arts in Brussels.

He exhibited his first landscape in 1837 after a season at Remouchamps with Van Marcke. From 1839 he began showing at the principal Belgian salons, at first sending landscapes: Sunken Lane near Liège at the 1839 Brussels Salon, View of the Banks of the Aîne in the Ardennes at the 1840 Antwerp Salon, and Landscape; Souvenir of the Ardennes at the 1842 Brussels Salon.

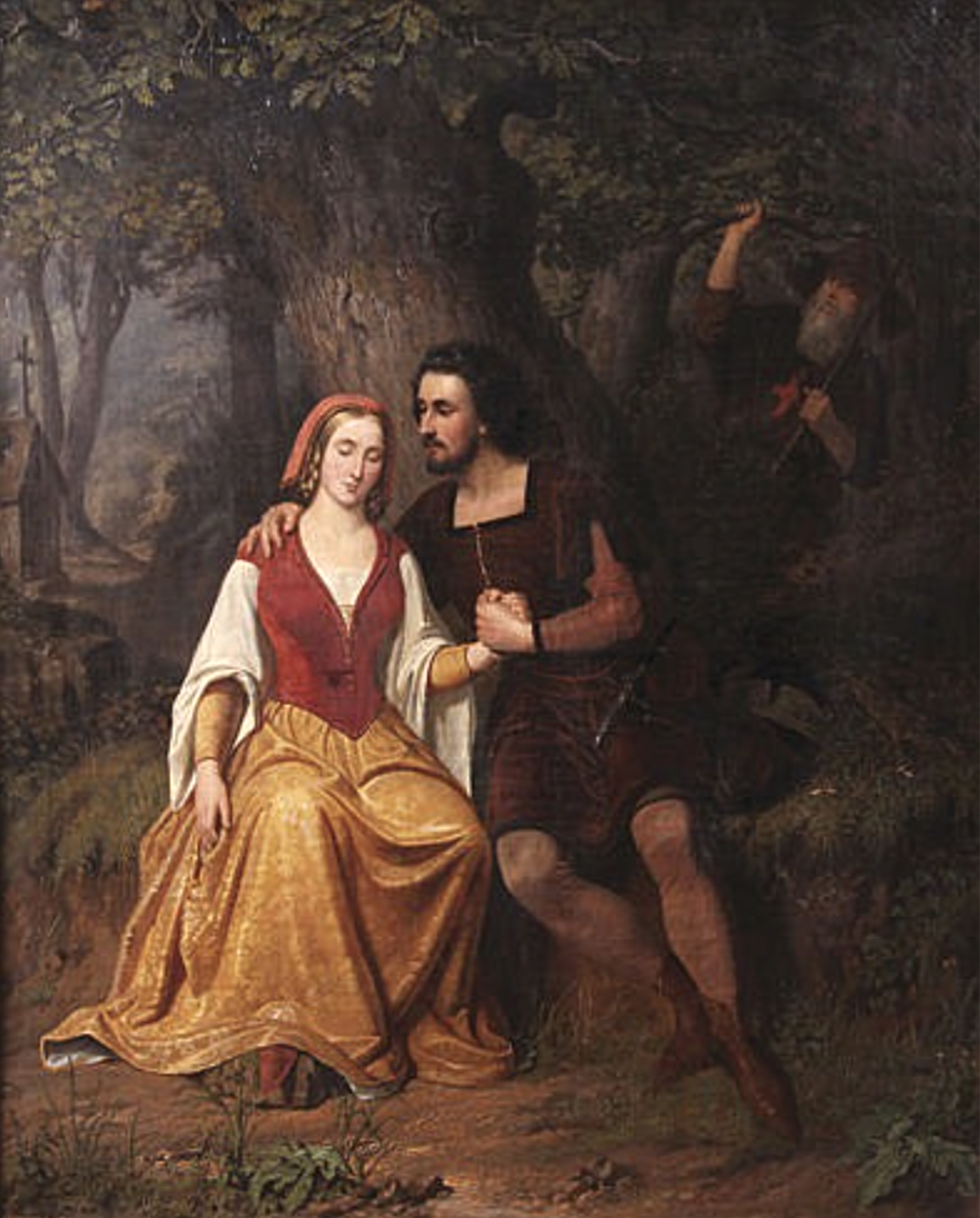
The Return from Palestine, 1844 (oil on canvas; 90.5 cm × 74 cm), private collection

In 1844 he exhibited his first historical canvas at the Ghent Salon: The Return from Palestine, depicting a Liège knight's homecoming after the Crusades. The work was shown again at the 1845 Brussels Salon.

The Darchis foundation offered him a travel scholarship, but family circumstances prevented him from accepting it. He never left Liège for extended study abroad, instead developing his skills through independent work.

=== Early career (1845–1854) ===
Soubre increasingly concentrated on historical subjects. His first notable success came in 1847 with The Burghers of Liège Storming the Home of Mayor Ghaye to Demand the Insignia of the Magistracy.

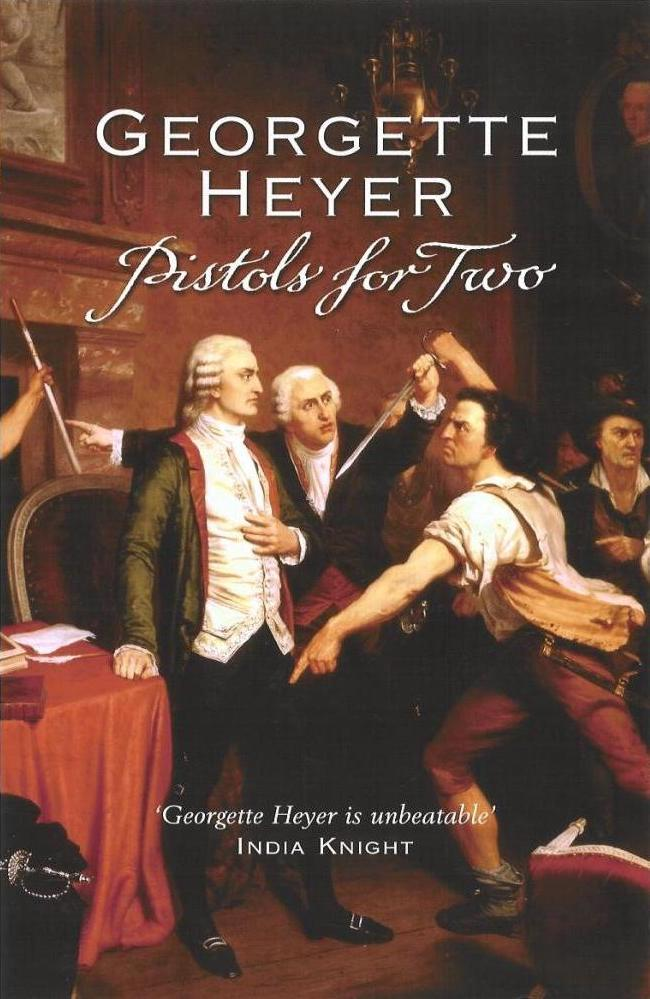
Georgette Heyer, Pistols for Two, 2005 Arrow Books edition, using Soubre's painting as the cover.

The painting shows an episode from the Liège Revolution: a crowd storms the home of mayor Philippe-François de Ghaye, demanding the keys of the magistracy. When Ghaye refuses, a burgher threatens him with a sword. The chief registrar Cologne intercepts the blow and, though wounded in the leg, saves the mayor. The painting was later used—under the title A Violent Attack—as the cover illustration for Georgette Heyer's short-story collection Pistols for Two (Arrow Books, 2005).

At the 1848 Brussels Salon Soubre showed Henri de Dinant, Liège Tribune Departing for Exile. A review noted that while the colouring was "somewhat commonplace", the composition and drawing were strong, and the costumes historically faithful.

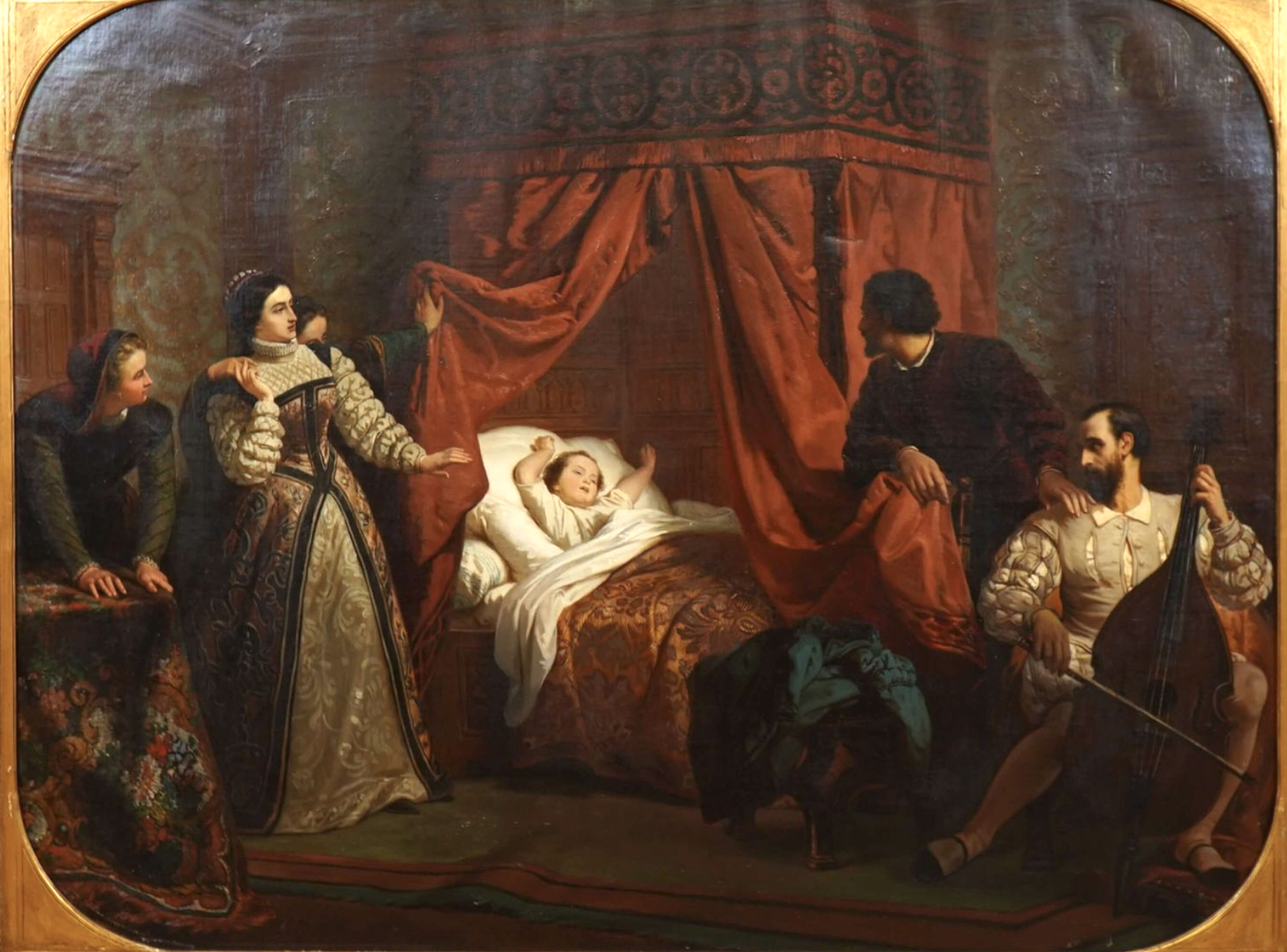
The Awakening of Montaigne, 1862 (oil on canvas; 78 cm × 105 cm), private collection

In 1850 he presented Death of Henry IV, German Emperor at the Liège salon. The following year he exhibited The Awakening of Montaigne at the Brussels Salon, which was well received by critics. The painting illustrates an anecdote from Michel de Montaigne's childhood: his father had him wakened each morning by music rather than abruptly, so as not to disturb his young mind. Soubre exhibited the work again at the 1852 Antwerp Salon and produced a smaller second version in 1862, which was sold to a private collector. At the 1854 Brussels Salon he showed The Last Boatload of Hay.

In 1853 Soubre married Eugénie Françoise Josephine Cajot. They had two daughters: Françoise (born June 1854) and Eugénie (born January 1857).

=== Professorship and mature work (1854–1889) ===
==== Teaching ====
Soubre was appointed professor of drawing at the Liège academy in August 1853 and taught there for over 35 years. He began in the elementary section, teaching linear drawing, replacing Henri Ponchon.

In 1859 he moved to intermediate teaching, taking over drawing "after the antique" and expression from Auguste Chauvin. When Chauvin retired in 1880, Soubre taught drawing "after the live model" and painting (advanced level) jointly with Jean-Mathieu Nisen for five years, and then exclusively after Nisen's death in 1885. Adrien de Witte succeeded him in the intermediate courses.

==== Exhibitions and sales ====
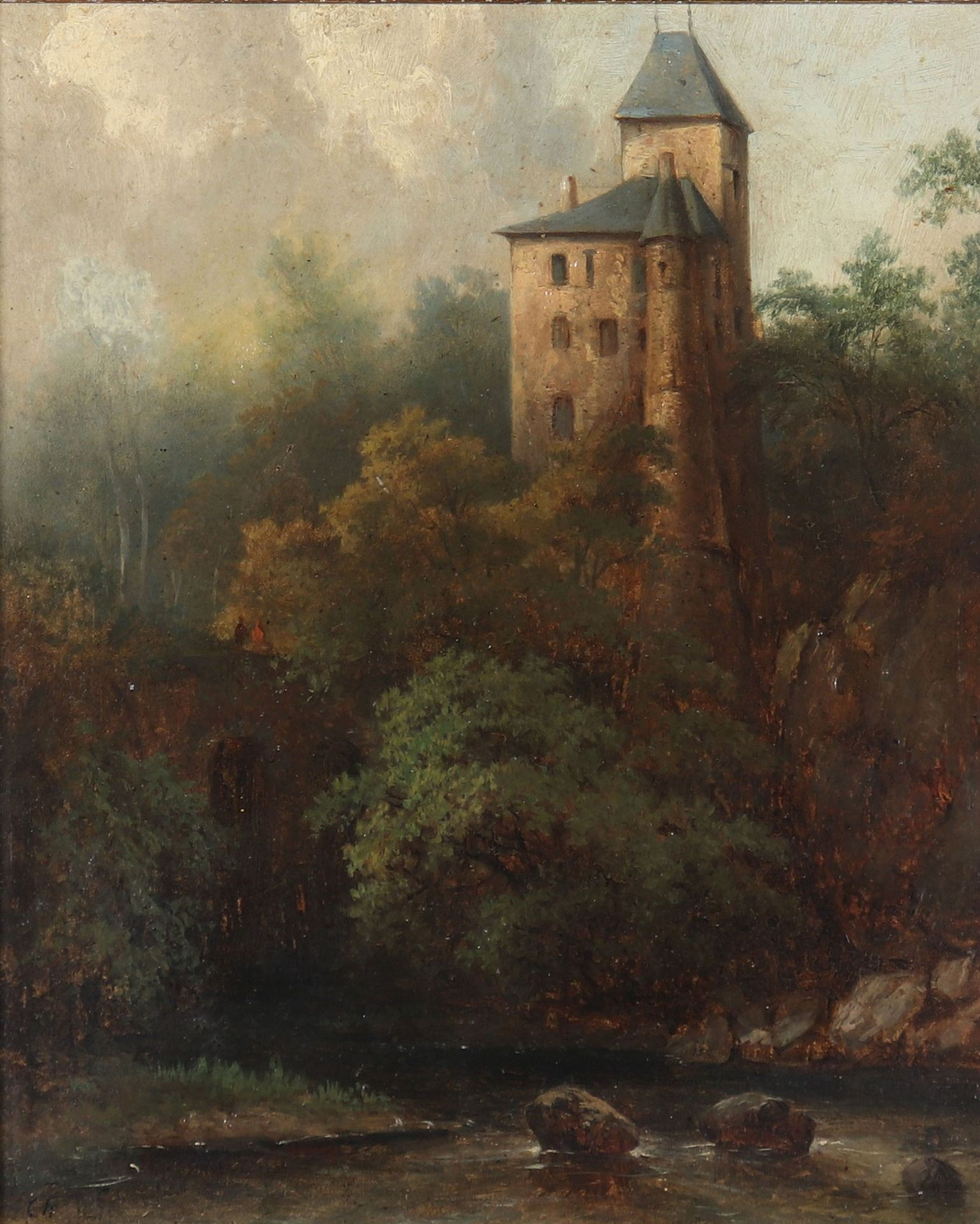
View of Remouchamps Castle, 1862 (oil on canvas; 26.5 cm × 22 cm), private collection

Alongside teaching, Soubre maintained an active exhibition schedule. He continued to produce historical scenes but also painted landscapes and genre works. In 1855 he showed Angelica and the Enchanted Horse, drawn from Orlando Furioso, at the Antwerp Salon. In 1857 at the Brussels Salon he exhibited Dream of an Arab Chief, Led by the Daughters of the Sea to the Conquest of the Blue Island, inspired by a tale from One Thousand and One Nights. The work was purchased by the Paris publisher Goupil & Cie and engraved by Jean-Baptiste-Alfred Cornilliet, broadening Soubre's reputation. At the 1860 Brussels Salon he showed The Madness of Ophelia.

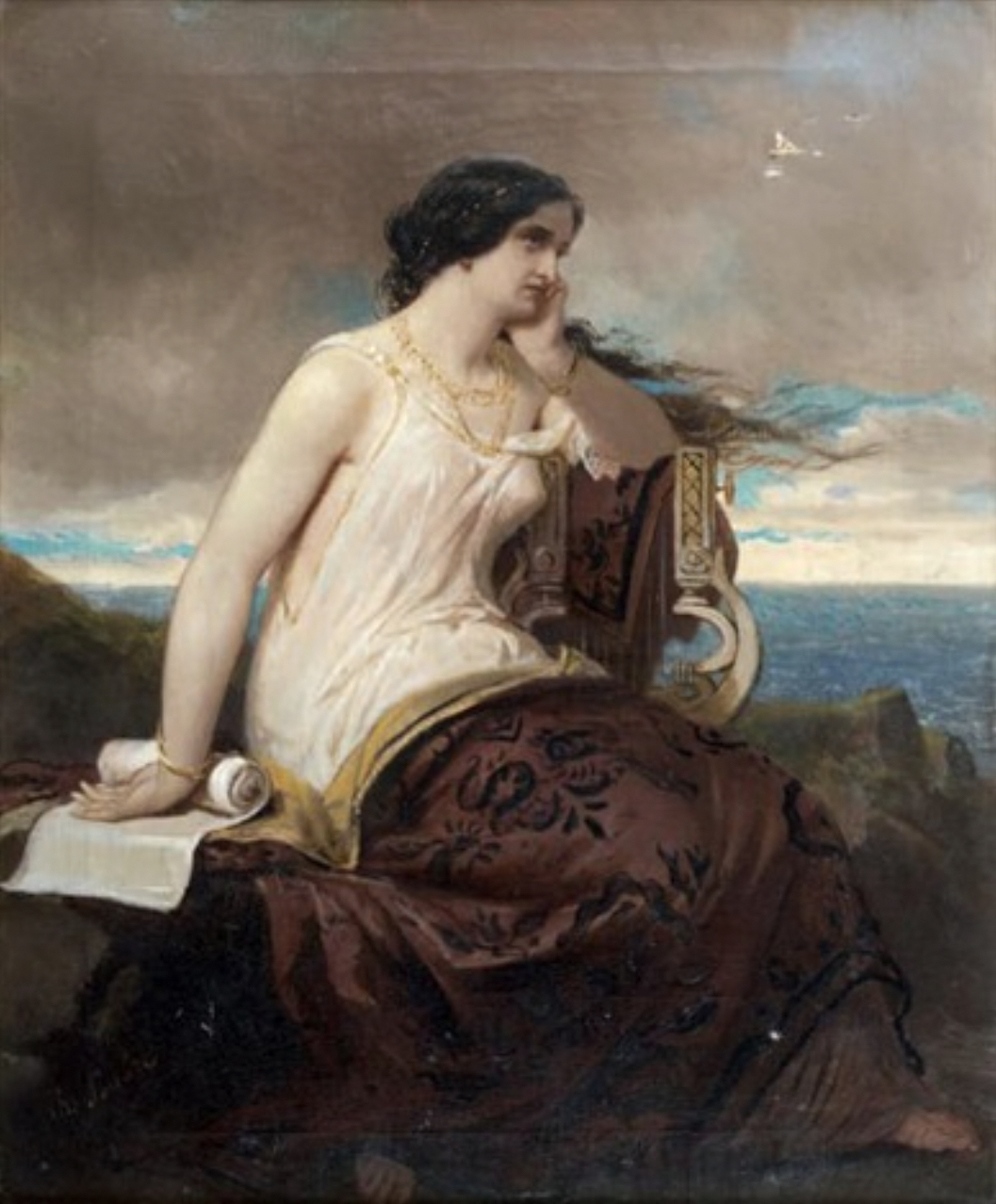
Sappho on the Promontory of Leucas, c. 1867 (oil on canvas; 40.4 cm × 32.5 cm), private collection

From 1861 onward his exhibition pace quickened, becoming nearly annual for over twenty years. He appeared at the Brussels Salon (1863, 1866, 1869, 1872, 1875, 1878, 1881, 1884), the Antwerp Salon (1864, 1867, 1873, 1876, 1879), the Ghent Salon (1865, 1868, 1871, 1874, 1877, 1880, 1883, 1889), and internationally at the Paris Salon (1861, 1863), the London International Exhibitions (1872, 1873, 1874), the Vienna World's Fair (1873), the Philadelphia Centennial Exposition (1876), the Sydney International Exhibition (1879–1880), and the Historical Exhibition of Belgian Art (1880). He received a gold medal at the 1866 Brussels Salon and a bronze medal at Sydney. He was made a knight of the Order of Leopold on 7 February 1879.

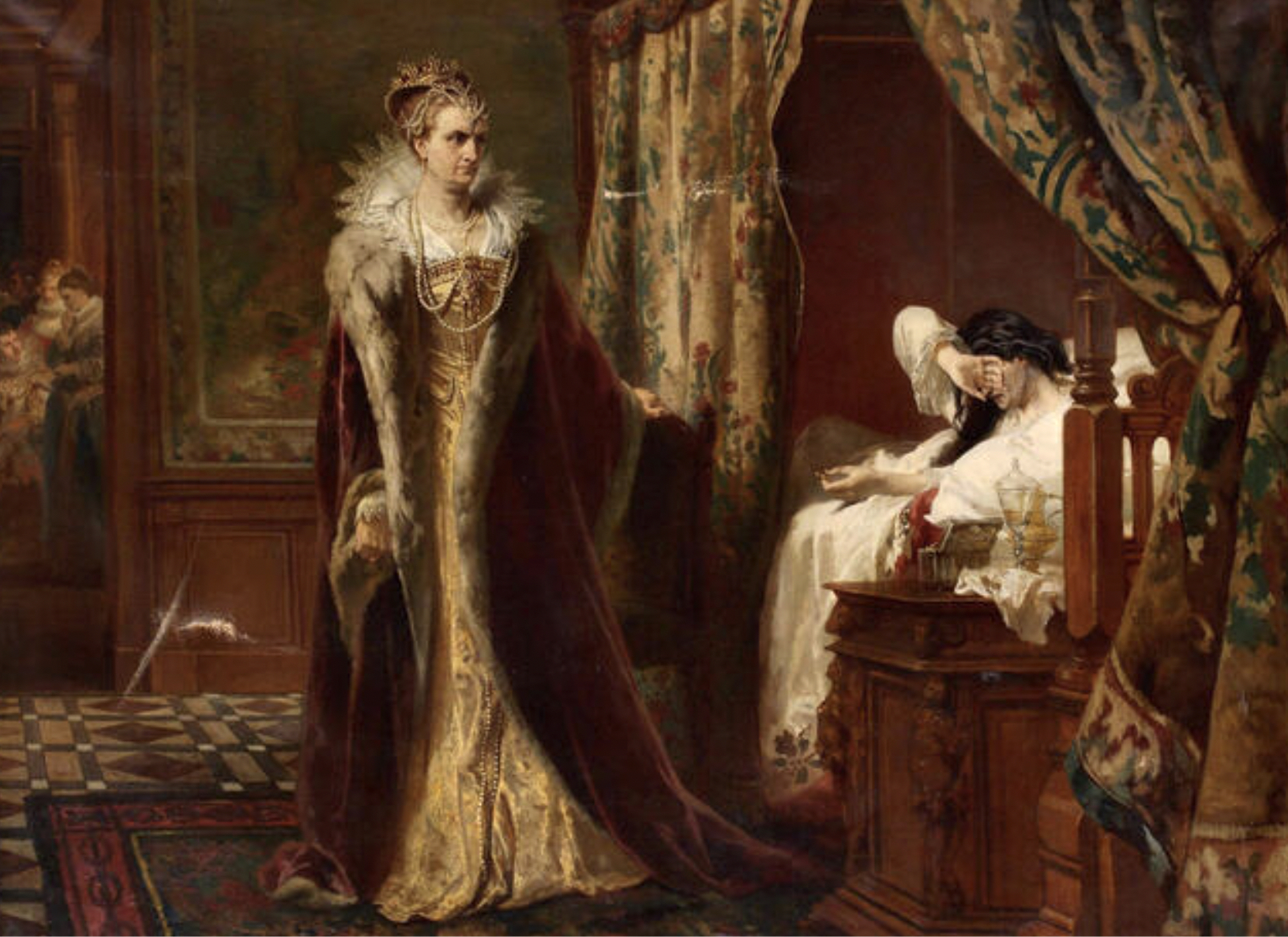
Lady Nottingham and Elizabeth, 1875 (oil on canvas; 89 cm × 116 cm), private collection

Several of Soubre's works were acquired by British collectors. The Awakening of Montaigne, A Burial in the Ardennes, and Lady Macbeth were sold in Dublin; Catherine of Aragon and Cardinal Wolsey, Mary Stuart, Departure for the Hunt, The Banquet of the Beggars, and Lady Nottingham and Elizabeth in London; and a later copy of The Banquet of the Beggars in Manchester. Other works travelled further: Convalescent was sold in Kyiv and Proud Humility in Sydney.

Some paintings remained in Belgian collections: the Execution of Pierre de Bex, Former Mayor of Liège belonged to Baron Rodolphe de Lamberts-Cortenbach; A Noble Family Before the Council of Troubles and The Departure of the Liège Volunteers for Brussels Led by Charles Rogier entered Liège's public collections; and La Måle Saint-Martin was acquired by the Belgian royal family.

==== Engravings and reproductions ====
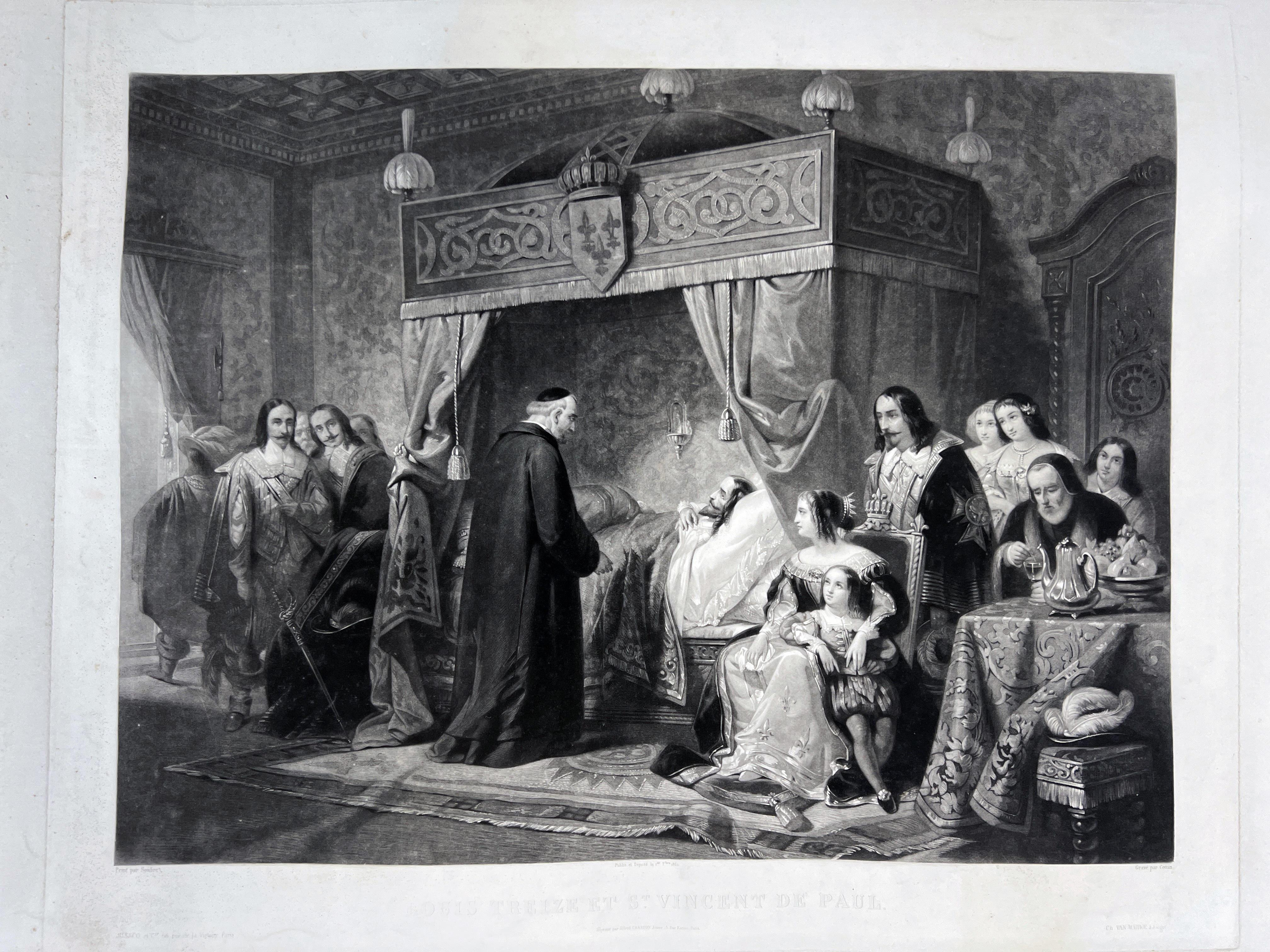
Saint Vincent de Paul Attending the Dying Louis XIII, 1861 (lithograph by Pierre Cottin after Soubre; 71 cm × 101 cm)

Soubre's reputation was extended by engraved and photographic reproductions of his work. His major paintings were reproduced in artistic publications in France, Germany, and England. Engravers who reproduced his work included Charles Baugniet (portrait of M. Du Vivier, 1859), Edmond Fierlants (photographic reproduction of The Banquet of the Beggars), Émile Tasset (photogravures for the Franklin Society of Liège album, 1877), Jean-Baptiste-Alfred Cornilliet, and Pierre Cottin for the house of Goupil & Cie.

==== Family ====
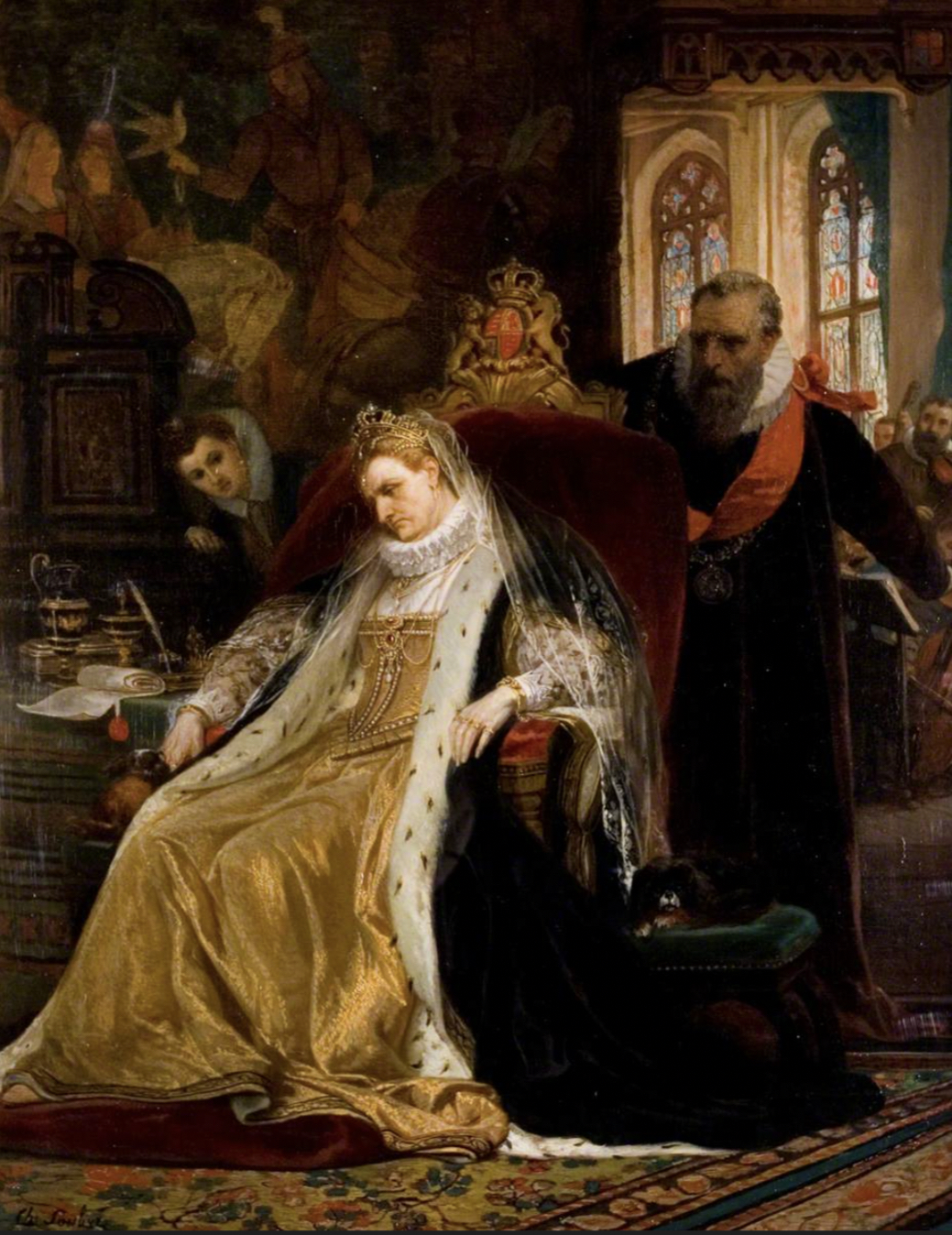
Elizabeth I Troubled, 1865–1880 (oil on canvas; 88 cm × 70 cm), Herbert Art Gallery and Museum, Coventry

Soubre's first wife, Eugénie Cajot, died in December 1861. On 11 August 1863 he married Marie Christine Wurth (1828–1908), his first wife's niece. They had two daughters: Madilène Jeanne (known as Madeleine), born in March 1865, and Marguerite Caroline, born in June 1869, who died at just over a year old.

Soubre's eldest daughter, Françoise, married the engineer Albert Battaille on 28 December 1878. Battaille was the son of Jean Battaille, an engineer in the Russian Empire, and Marie Straatman, daughter of the Brussels shipowner Lambert Straatman. They had three children.

On 26 April 1879, his second daughter Eugénie married the painter Émile Delperée (born Daxhelet), a former pupil of Soubre's at the academy. They had two children.

His third daughter, Madeleine (1865–1922), became a painter of flowers. She exhibited with her father at the Ghent Salon of 1883 and at the 1884 Brussels Salon, and participated in several exhibitions at the Royal Circle of Fine Arts of Liège. In 1898 she married the artillery lieutenant Henri Dupont, who commanded the Meuse fortifications during the defence of Liège in 1914. Dupont was taken prisoner by the Germans in April 1915 and held at Blankenbourg until the Armistice.

=== Final years (1889–1895) ===
Soubre resigned his teaching post on 11 February 1889 and was named honorary professor in recognition of his service. He was replaced in drawing "after the live model" by Adrien de Witte and in painting by his son-in-law, Émile Delperée. His former pupils held a celebration in his honour at the academy on 27 June 1889, presenting him with an album of 42 drawings.

Soubre died unexpectedly on 29 January 1895 and was buried in Robermont Cemetery in Liège.

== Work ==
=== Style ===
Charles Soubre was primarily a painter of historical subjects, genre scenes, portraits, landscapes, and female nudes. He is associated with the Romantic movement.

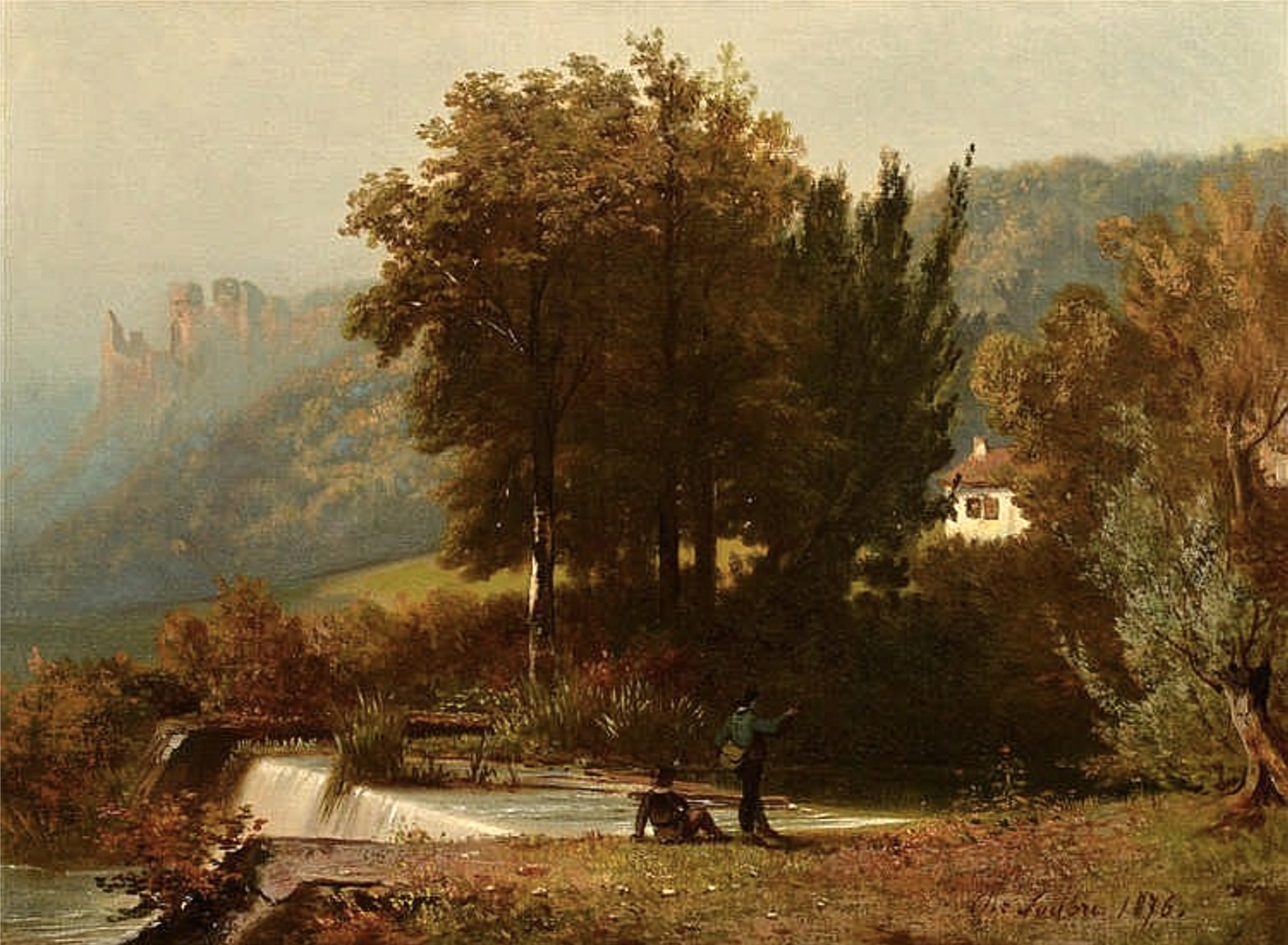
Landscape with Figures by a Waterfall, 1876 (oil on canvas; 42 cm × 55 cm), private collection

As a landscape painter, Soubre worked en plein air and had a taste for large formats unusual for the period, according to the art critic and museum curator Jules Bosmant. He ranged widely in search of subjects, from Grand-Halleux to the Grand Duchy of Luxembourg. Bosmant considered that Soubre "tended to see broadly, and rather as a decorator concerned with overall effect and balance, than with the truth of atmosphere and milieu". The art historian André Marchal concurred, noting Soubre's "pursuit of balanced masses, an organisation of planes and decorative synthesis".

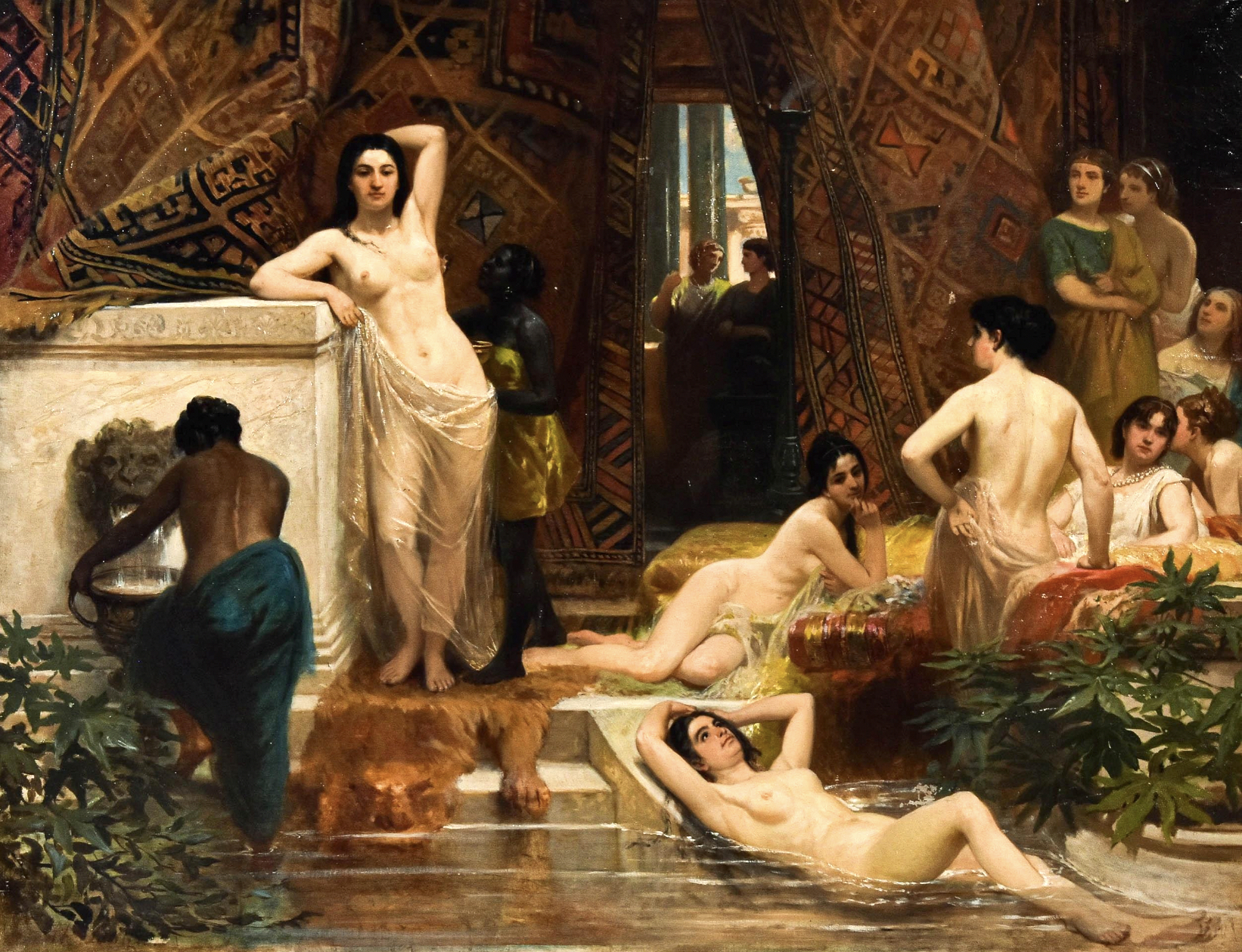
Oriental Harem Scene, before 1895 (oil on canvas; 90 cm × 115 cm), private collection

The few nudes Soubre produced late in his career were, in Bosmant's words, "most chaste and quite inoffensive". They were unusual in being set in open-air décors with streams and trees surrounding female figures. When Soubre exhibited these works—considered audacious in provincial Liège at the end of the 19th century—a local newspaper rebuked him for neglecting "the moral duties of a professor at the Academy".

As a history painter, Bosmant wrote, Soubre brought "a serious spirit and gifts as a colourist which, at that time at least, were not negligible", and he drew more from local history and legend than any of his contemporaries. The art historian David Bronze observed that Soubre and his son-in-law Émile Delperée "perpetuate as best they can the tradition of history painting in Liège".

Soubre also produced decorative works. Around 1860 he painted a series of eight murals in the Edmond Hustinx room of the Vrijthof Theatre in Maastricht, personifying the four seasons and the four elements.

=== Principal works ===
==== Death of Henry IV, German Emperor (1850) ====
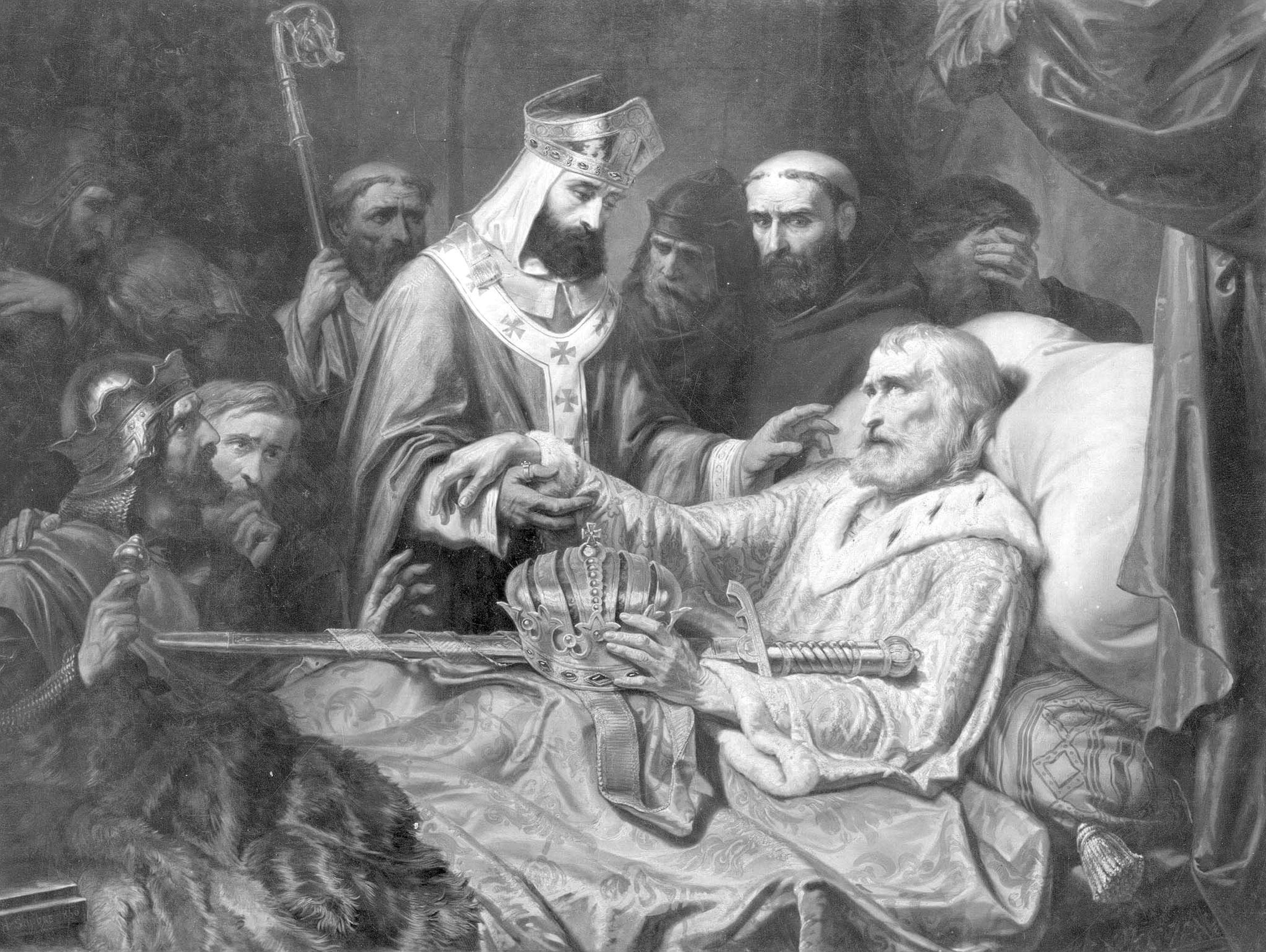
Death of Henry IV, German Emperor, 1850 (oil on canvas; 211 cm × 275 cm), La Boverie, Liège

Commissioned by the city of Liège, this painting was a success when exhibited at the Liège Salon in 1850. It depicts the final moments of Henry IV, Holy Roman Emperor, who died in Liège on 7 August 1106. Having been deposed and betrayed by his son Henry V, the emperor took refuge in Liège. Surrounded by the few friends who remained loyal, he died forgiving his son and placed the imperial insignia—a ring, a sword, and a crown—in the hands of Otbert, Bishop of Liège. The house on Féronstrée where Henry IV died bears the inscription "Here died Henry IV".

==== Victor Pisani (1866) ====
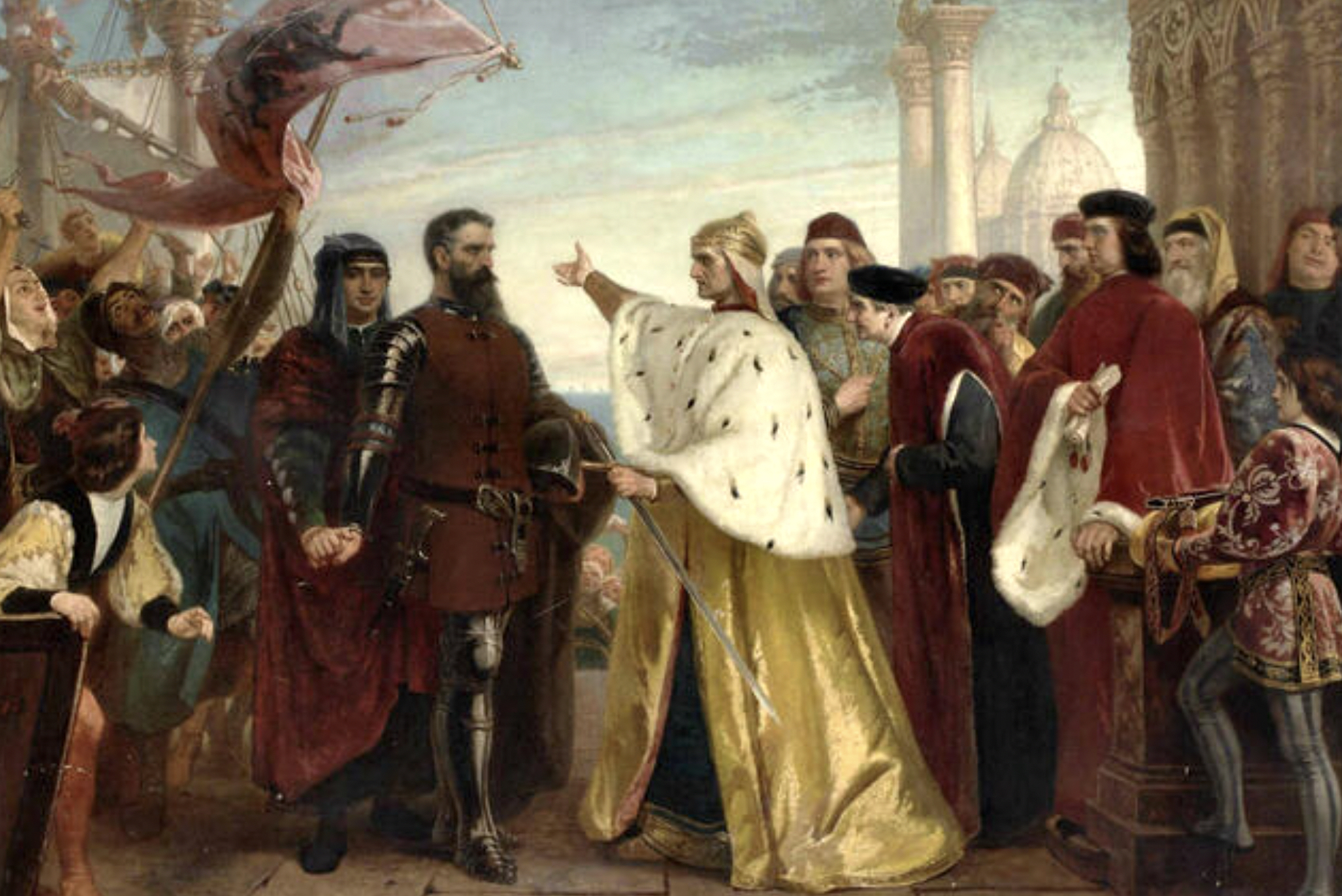
Victor Pisani, 1866 (oil on canvas; 116 cm × 166 cm), private collection

Exhibited at the 1866 Brussels Salon, this painting earned Soubre a gold medal. The subject is taken from the history of the Venetian Republic: the admiral Victor Pisani, imprisoned after a setback during the War of Chioggia against Genoa, is released at the demand of the Venetian people when the city itself comes under threat. He takes up his sword once more, swearing to set aside the injustice done to him for the sake of the fatherland.

The Journal des beaux-arts of 30 September 1866 praised the work: "One of the finest episodes in the history of Venice inspired M. Soubre to a fine composition. Pisani forgetting the injustice of his compatriots to save his fatherland is a subject worthy of the artist in question. The admiral is well placed; the gesture by which he clasps ... the hand of a faithful friend placed behind him is very felicitous."

==== Proud Humility (1871) ====
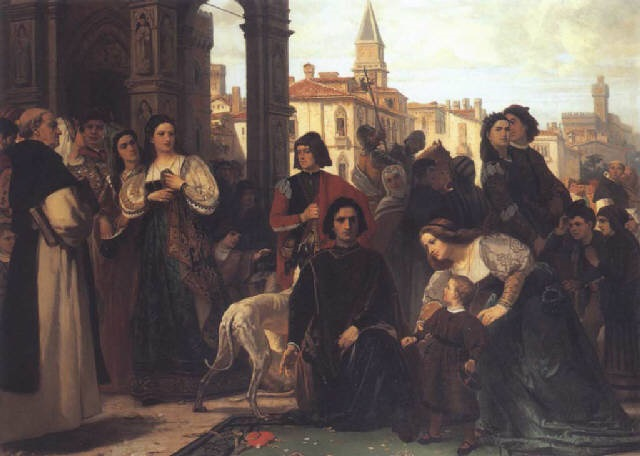
Proud Humility, 1871 (oil on canvas; 124 cm × 174 cm), private collection

The painting was shown at the 1871 Ghent Salon and the 1872 London International Exhibition. It illustrates an episode from Canto XI of Dante's Purgatorio: the Sienese nobleman Provenzano Salvani, needing to raise ten thousand florins to ransom a friend held by Charles of Anjou, humbles himself by begging in the great square of Siena.

A review in La Meuse on 13 July 1863 described the composition: "In the foreground of the painting the noble Salvani ... is kneeling before the carpet spread out to receive the gifts of passers-by ... Reading in this man's features the nobility of the feelings that animate him, one understands that this is no ordinary beggar, but a great lord." The review noted that a canvas on the same subject, titled Provenzano Salvani Begging for his Friend's Ransom, appeared at the 1863 Brussels Salon. It is unclear whether the 1871 Proud Humility is the same painting or a second version.

==== A Noble Family Before the Council of Troubles (1873) ====
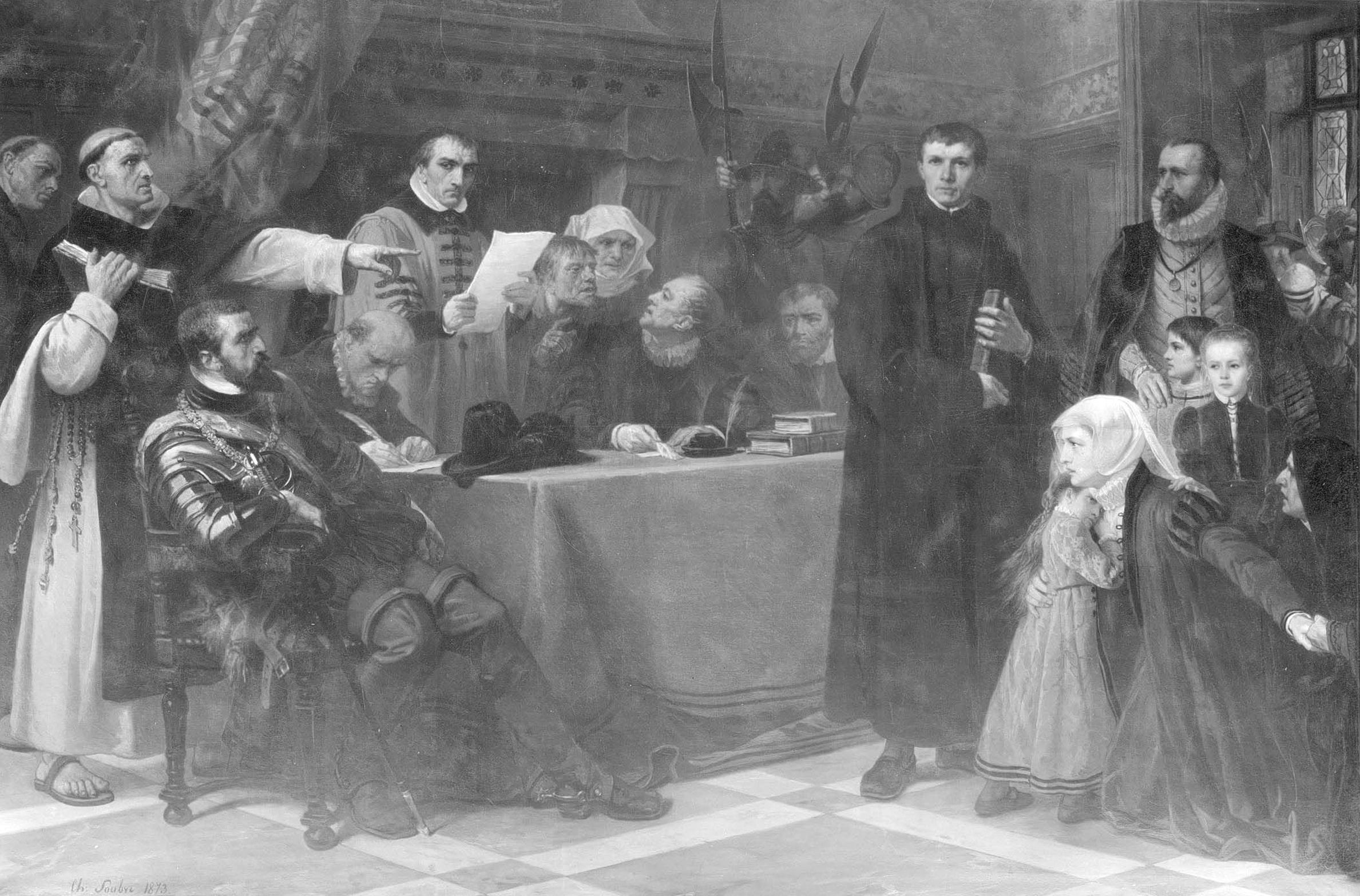
A Noble Family Before the Council of Troubles, 1873 (oil on canvas; 137 cm × 200 cm), La Boverie, Liège

Soubre exhibited this work at the 1873 Vienna World's Fair and the 1874 London International Exhibition before it was acquired by the city of Liège in 1875. Reproductions were made by wood engraving and photogravure.

The scene is set before the Council of Troubles, the tribunal established by the Duke of Alba to suppress unrest in the Netherlands from 1566. Also known as the Council of Blood, it was responsible for numerous executions; a study published by the Royal Academy of Belgium in 1961 lists 12,302 victims banished or executed between 1567 and 1573.

Jules Bosmant considered the painting to be "of a sufficiently broad historical scope to be situated solely in time", representing "a moment of our Western civilisation". He noted that the "very sober composition, in which gestures are rare and measured, in which there is no theatrical effect, does not lack grandeur".

==== La Måle Saint-Martin (1876) ====
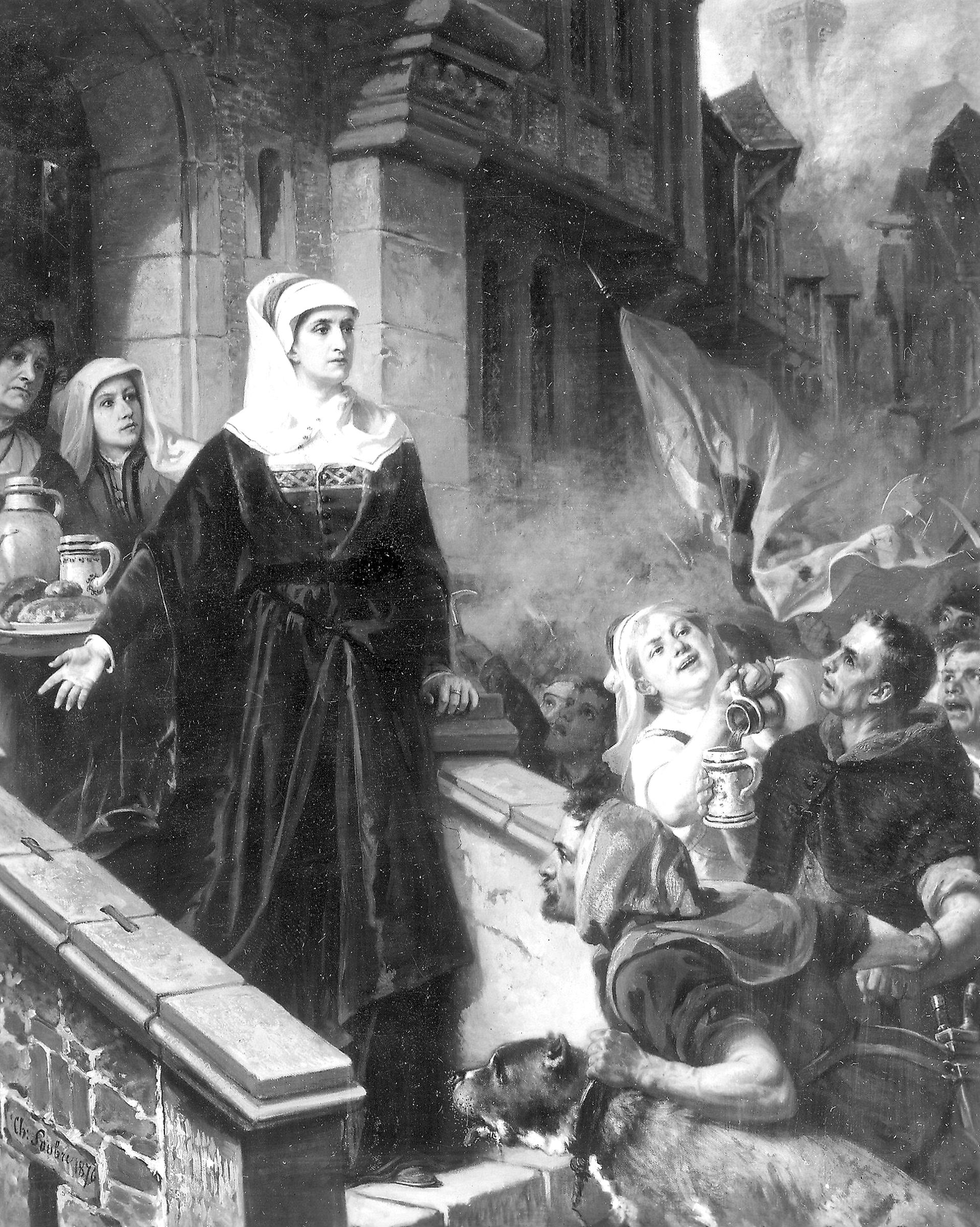
La Måle Saint-Martin, 1876 (oil on canvas; 135 cm × 108 cm), Royal Collection, Brussels

This painting, which entered the Belgian Royal Collection, was sent to the Philadelphia Centennial Exposition of 1876 and the 1877 Ghent Salon. It depicts an episode from the 14th-century conflict known as the Måle Saint-Martin: the guilds of Liège, learning that nobles had hidden in houses near St. Hubert, invaded them and killed all those they found. A wealthy woman, Marie de Fooz, saved 150 conspirators hidden in her own house by having the doors opened and welcoming the burghers, urging them to take whatever they needed. Her house was not searched.

==== The Departure of the Liège Volunteers for Brussels (1878) ====
Shown as The 4th of September 1830 at the 1878 Brussels Salon, the Liège Salon of 1879, and the 1880 Historical Exhibition of Belgian Art, the painting entered the Liège public collections in 1887 through a donation from Mrs Dumont-Lamarche.

The work belongs to the body of Belgian Revolution historical painting that celebrated national identity. It shows the evening of 4 September 1830, when Charles Rogier gathered Liège volunteers in the courtyard of the Palace of the Prince-Bishops to march to Brussels and support the insurrection there. Rogier, on horseback, brandishes a standard in the Liège colours of red and yellow bearing the words "Conquer or die for Brussels". The crowd includes notables alongside popular figures such as botteresses (street porters) and street urchins. Behind Rogier, armed men march; in the foreground a young man beats the infantry drum.

The art historian Serge Le Bailly de Tilleghem described the painting as "the last burst of splendour of the grand genre", a belated echo of the pictorial Brabançonne that Gustave Wappers's The September Days had been for the young Belgian nation. The curator Grégory Desauvage noted in 2016 that Soubre "gives the scene an astonishing realism" and that "the faces and the places are rendered with great precision and add to the intensity of the moment".

The Royal Museum of the Armed Forces and Military History in Brussels holds a companion painting from 1880, The Arrival of Charles Rogier and the Liège Volunteers in Brussels, which depicts the end of the same journey. It uses an elongated, frieze-like composition typical of military-triumph scenes.

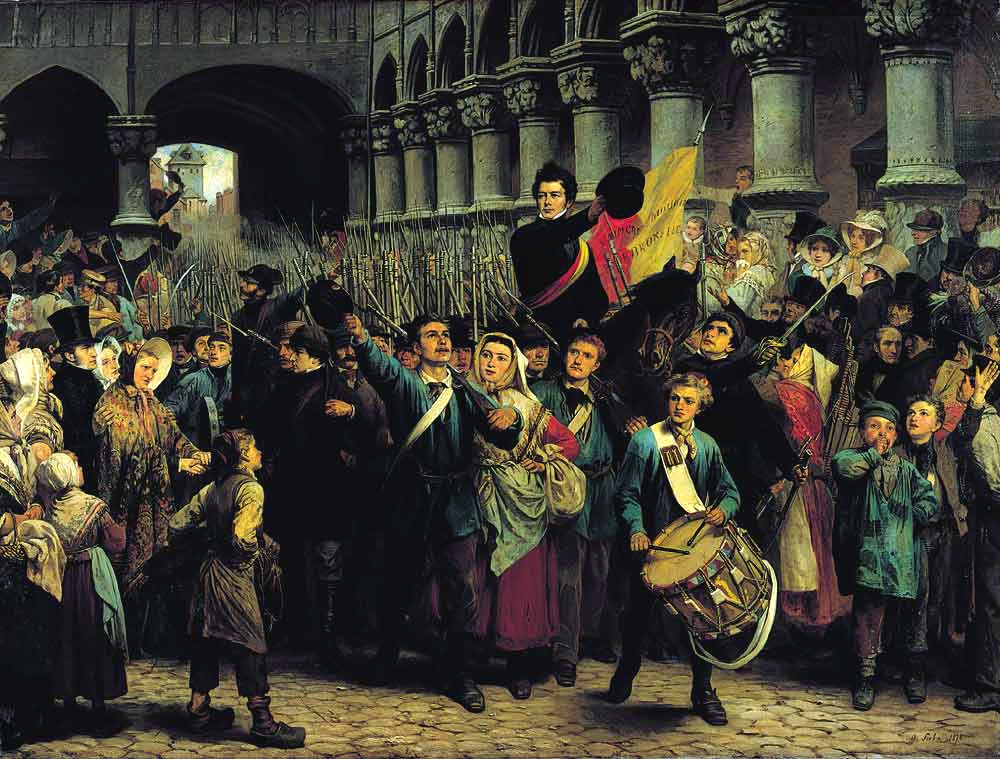
The Departure of the Liège Volunteers for Brussels Led by Charles Rogier, 1878 (oil on canvas; 220 cm × 285 cm), La Boverie, Liège

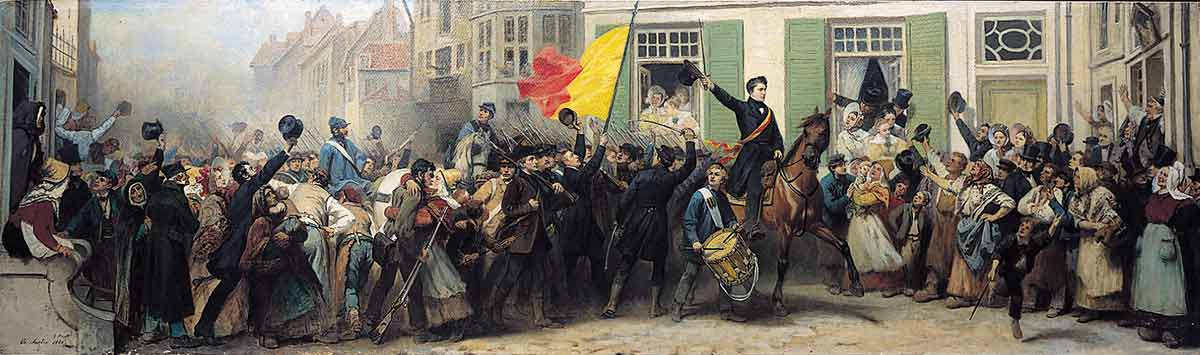
The Arrival of Charles Rogier and the Liège Volunteers in Brussels, 1880 (oil on canvas; 86 cm × 293 cm), Royal Museum of the Armed Forces and Military History, Brussels

=== Collections ===
Works by Charles Soubre are held by La Boverie in Liège, the Museum of Walloon Life, the Royal Museum of the Armed Forces and Military History, the Herbert Art Gallery and Museum in Coventry, the Belgian Royal Collection, and various private collections.

=== Critical reception ===
During his lifetime Soubre's work was generally well received by critics and the public. His obituary in La Meuse in 1895 described his talent as characterised by "the exquisite tact of feeling, the touching harmony between the idea and the interpretation ... Nothing violent or brutal escaped that caressing brush." It acknowledged, however, that the kind of art Soubre represented had fallen out of fashion.

In 1995 the historian Micheline Josse wrote that Soubre's compositions, "very much in the spirit of his time", had been highly prized but "today they are often judged too theatrical". David Bronze, writing in 2001, considered that Soubre's historical works "testify to undeniable qualities as a painter" but "remain very conventional". Bronze found more to admire in Soubre's portraiture, where he showed "real aptitude".

Soubre's plein air landscapes outlasted the decline of his historical painting. The pursuit of balance, organisation, and synthesis in his landscape work continued to be valued long after his death.

=== Gallery ===
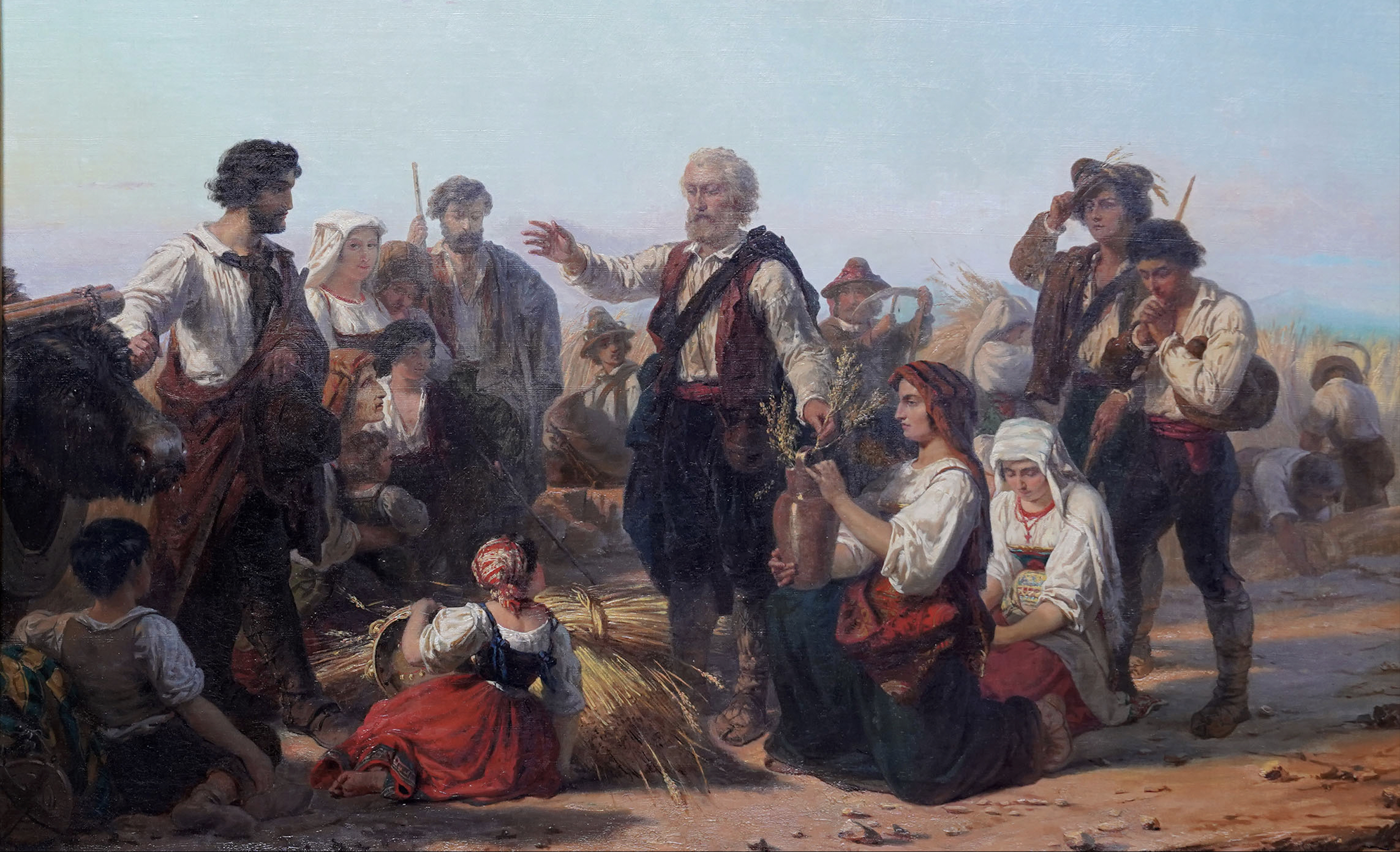
The Roman Blessing of the Harvest, 1853 (oil on canvas; 66 cm × 88 cm), private collection

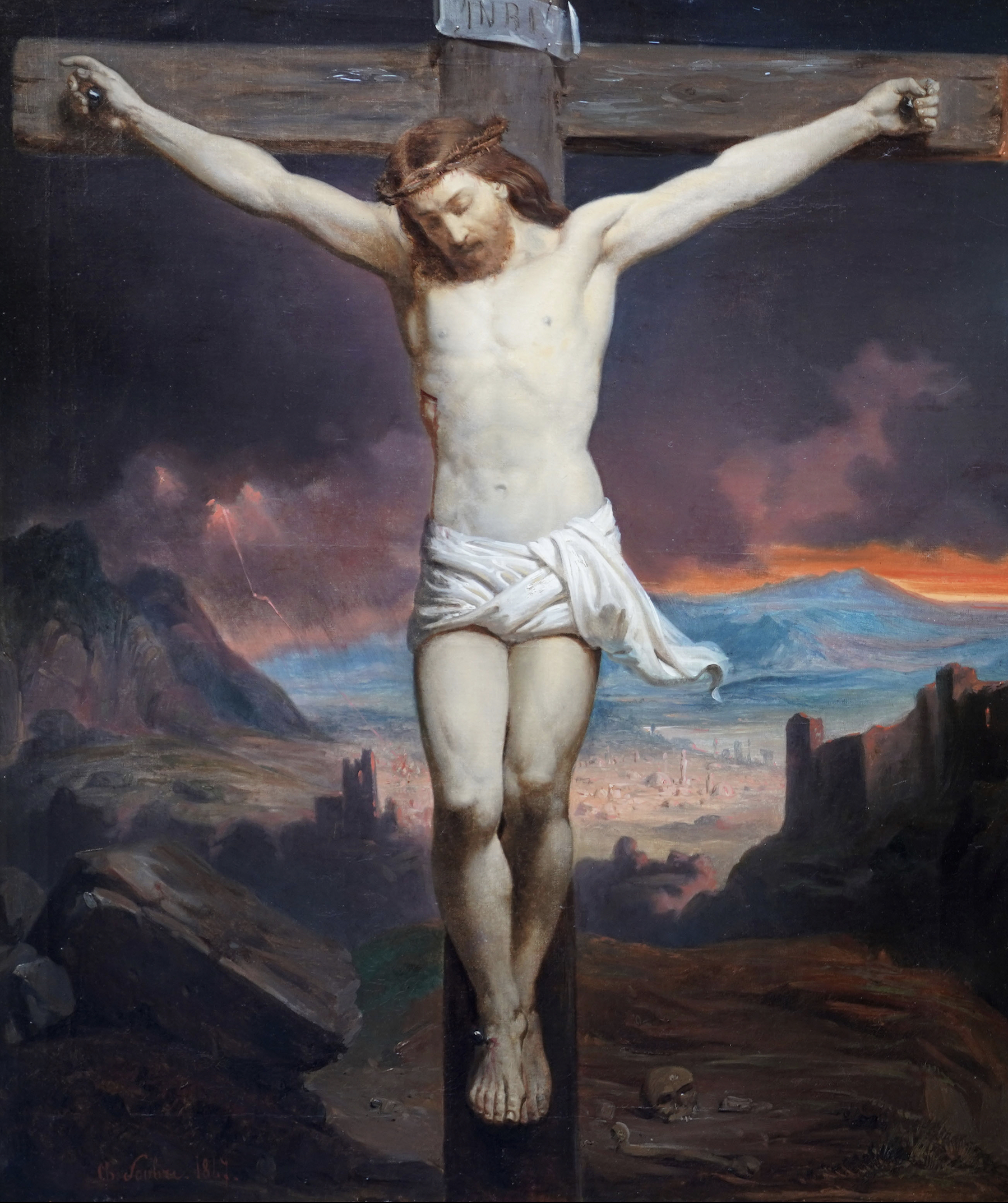
The Crucifixion, 1867 (oil on canvas; 74.5 cm × 64 cm), private collection

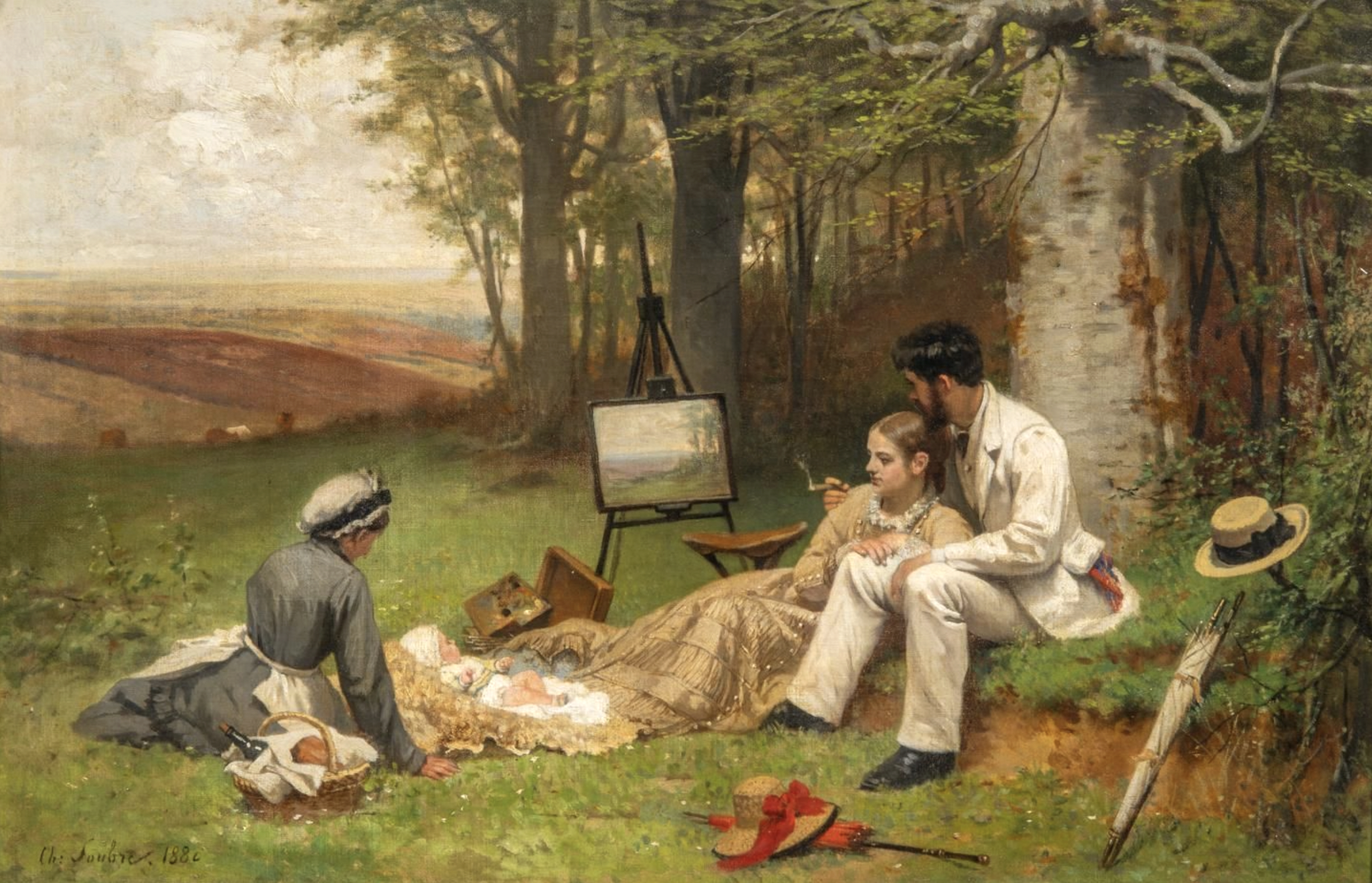
The Artist Working en plein air with his Family, 1880 (oil on canvas; 45 cm × 70 cm), private collection

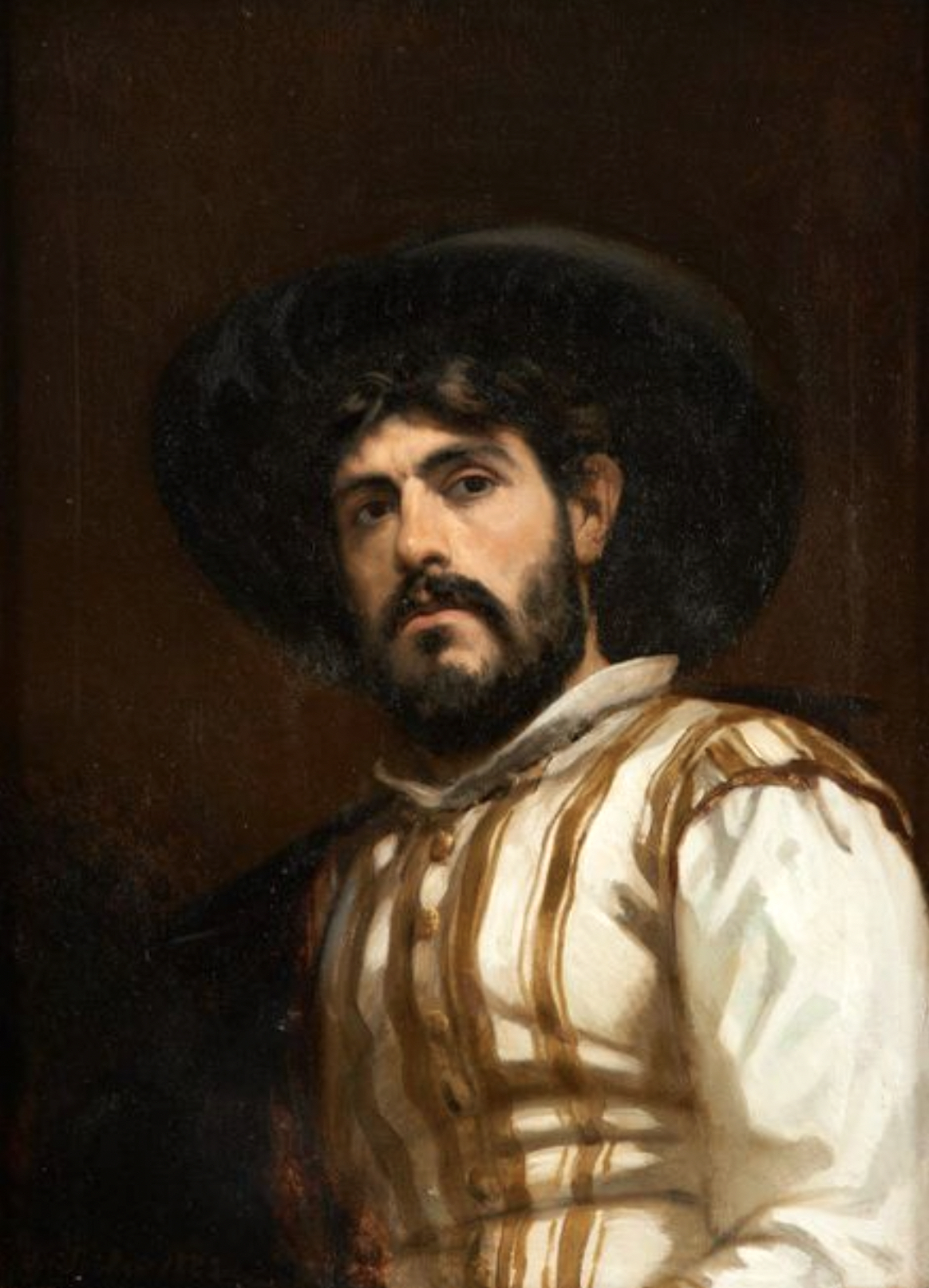
Musketeer, 1883 (oil on canvas; 75 cm × 55 cm), private collection

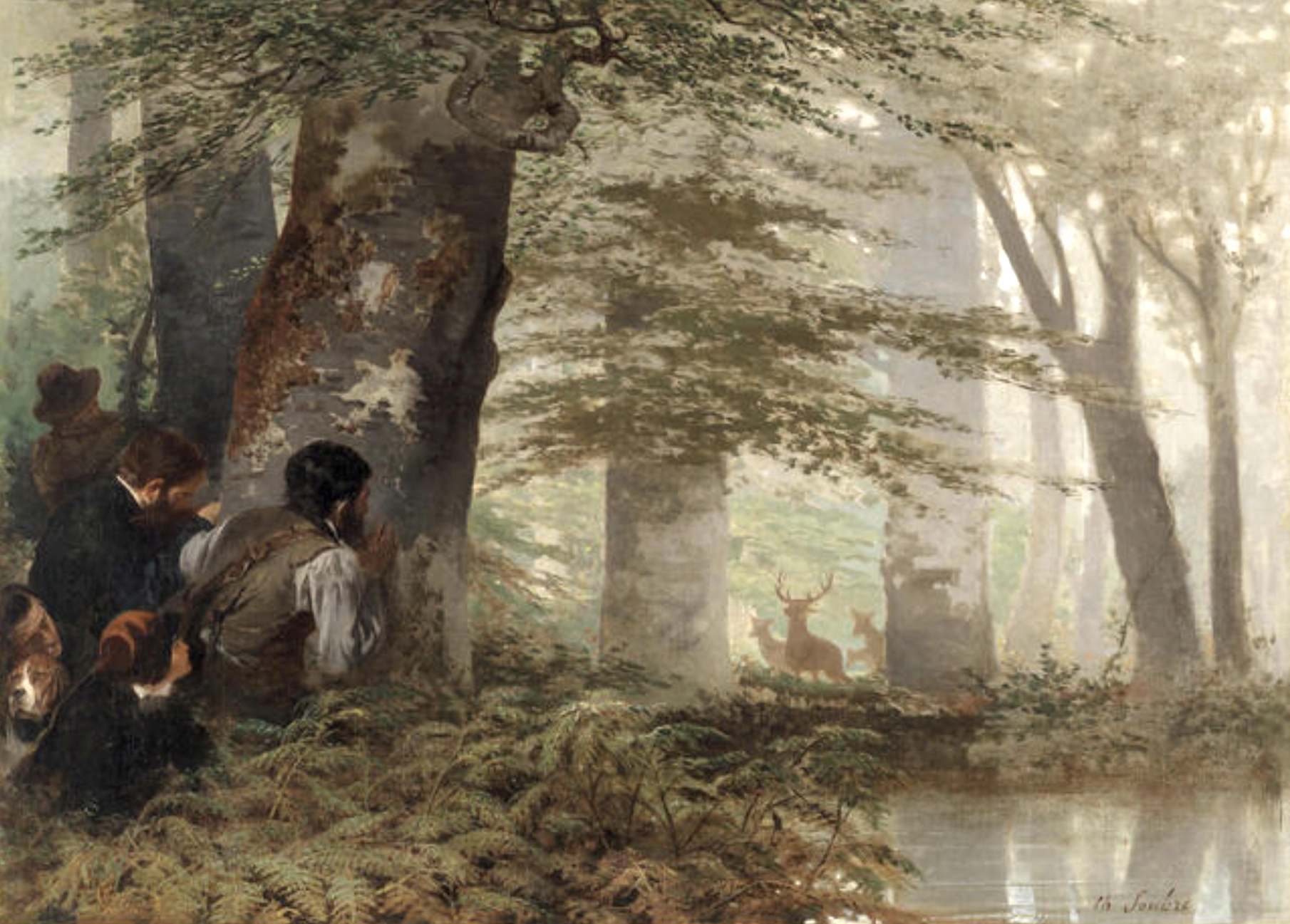
Poachers, before 1895 (oil on canvas; 58 cm × 76 cm), private collection

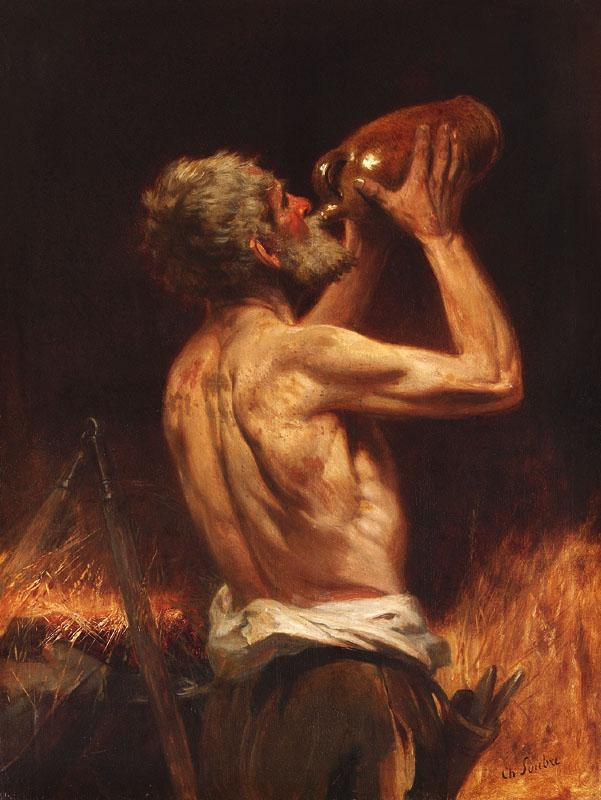
The Thirsty Reaper, before 1895 (oil on canvas; 115 cm × 88 cm), private collection

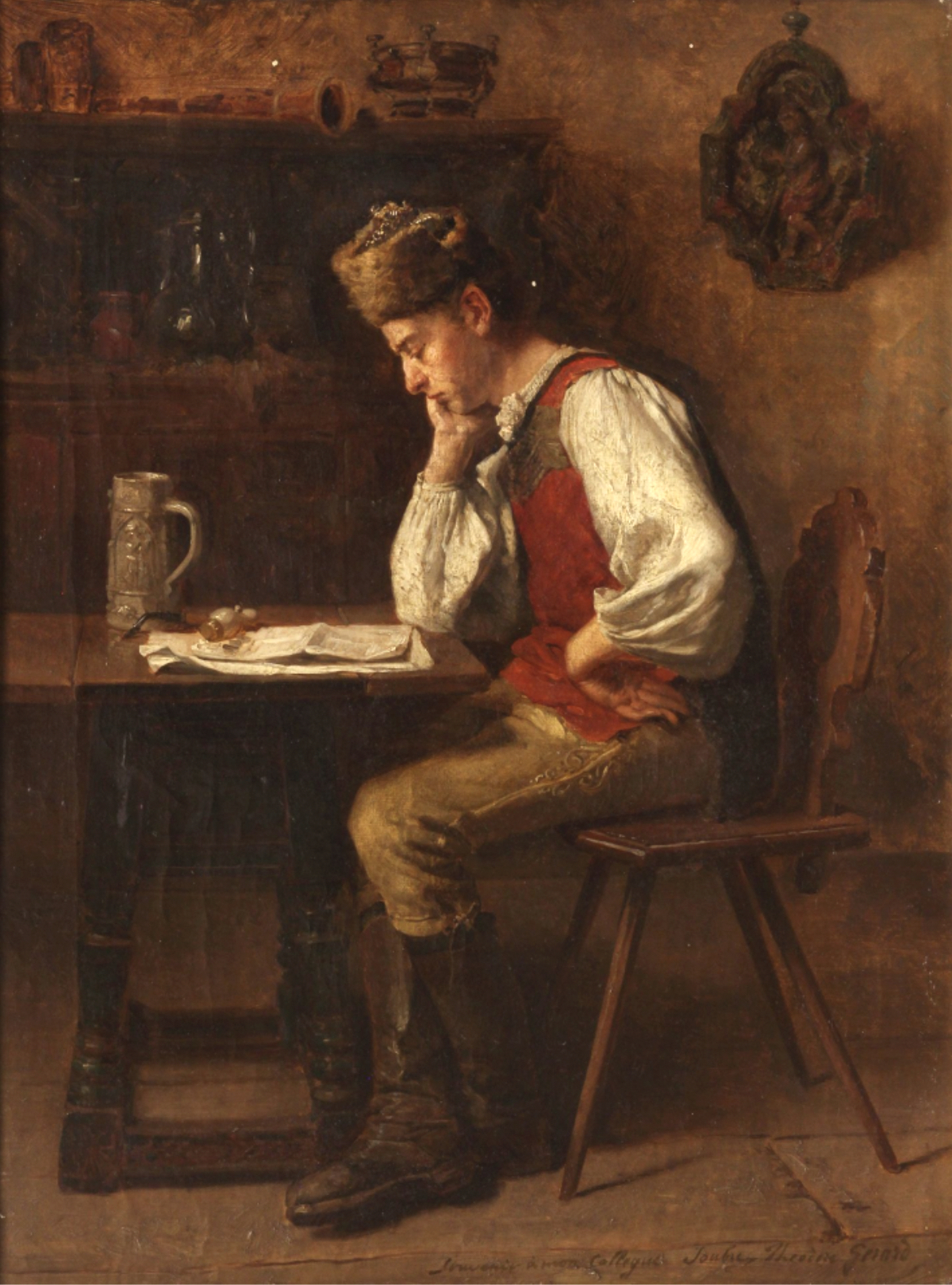
Seated Man, before 1895 (oil on canvas; 49 cm × 37 cm), private collection

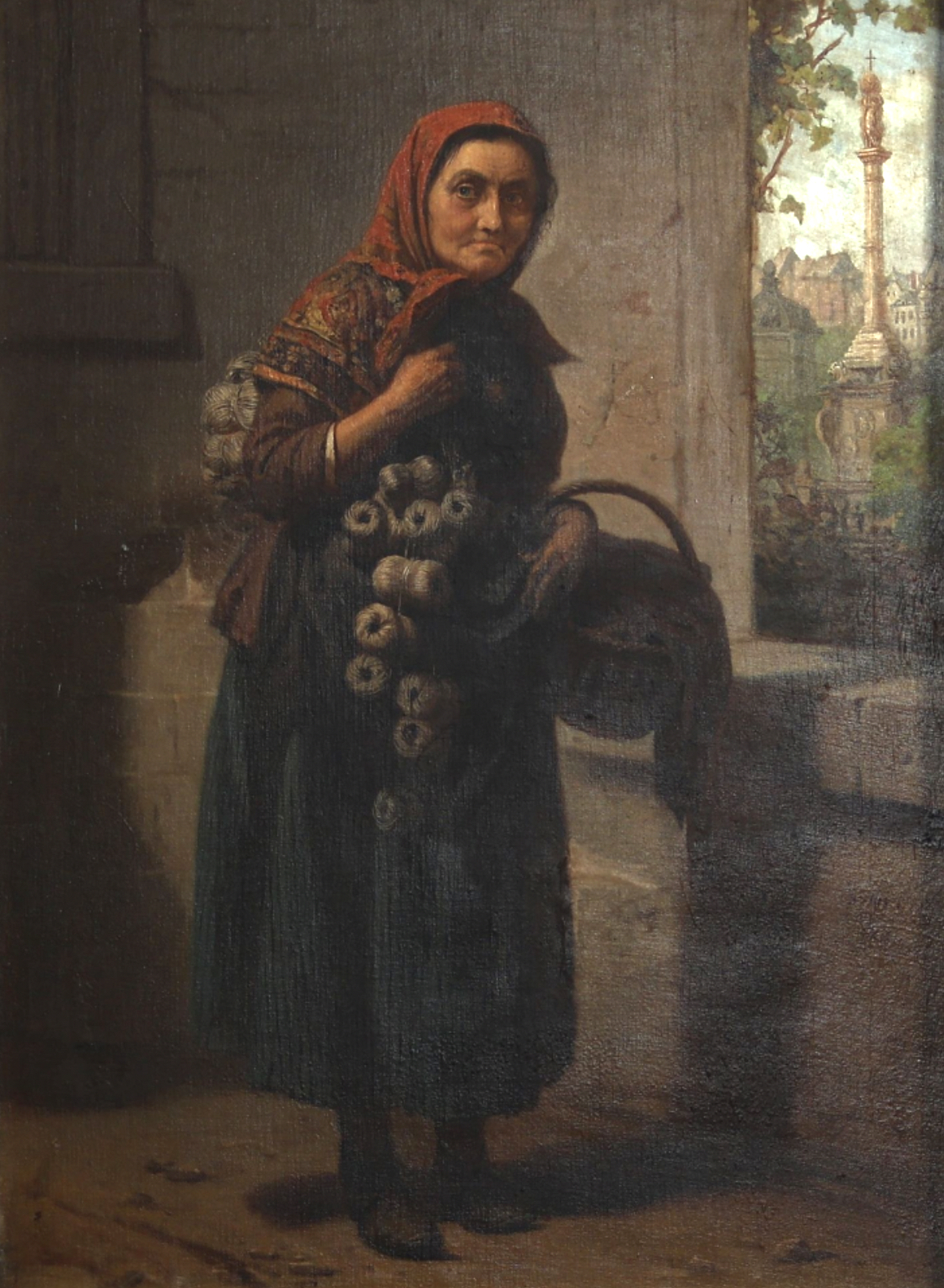
The String Seller, before 1895 (oil on canvas; 80 cm × 59 cm), private collection

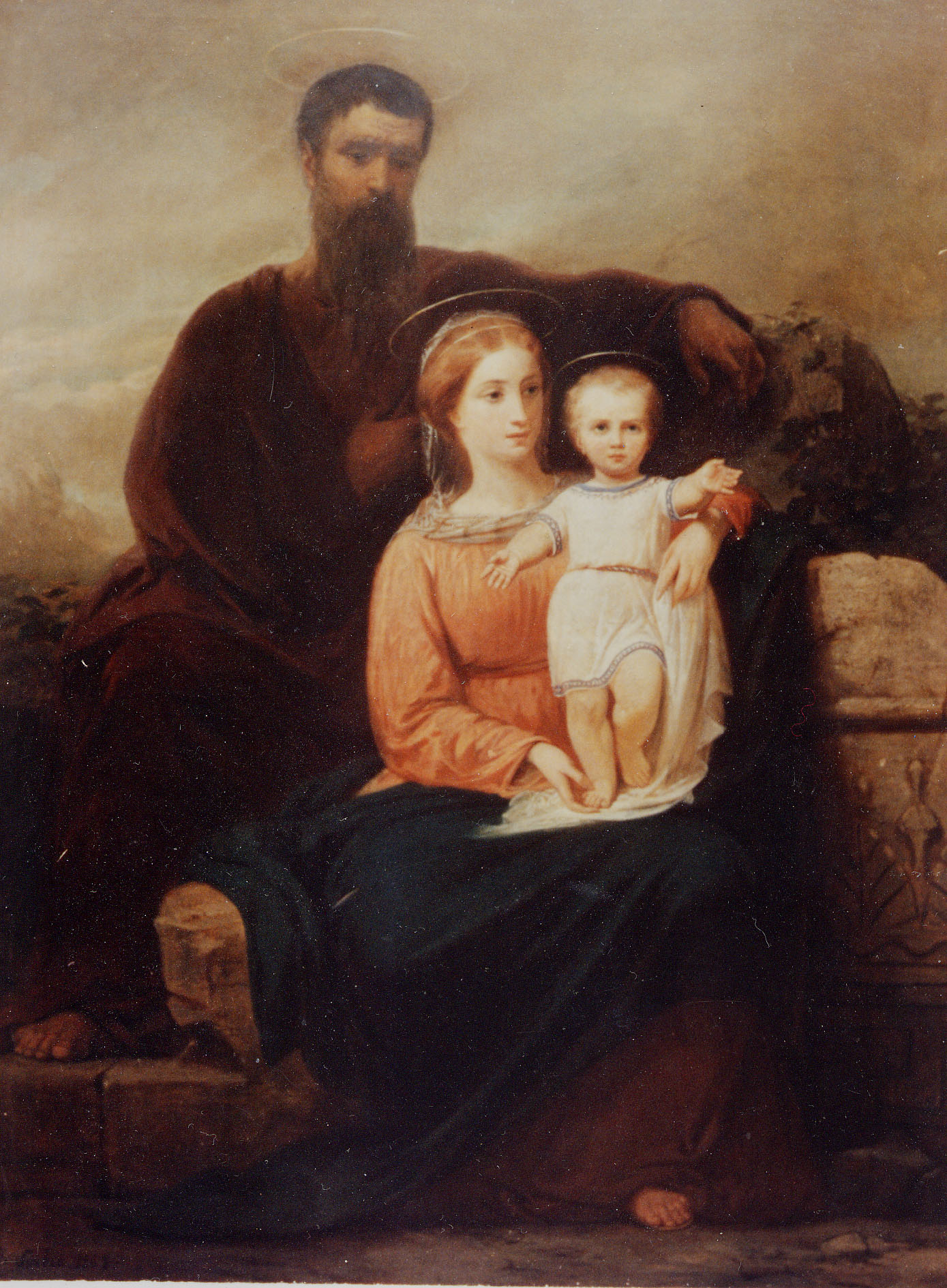
The Holy Family, 1862 (oil on canvas; 200 cm × 155 cm), Amercœur, chapel of the convent of the Sisters of Hope

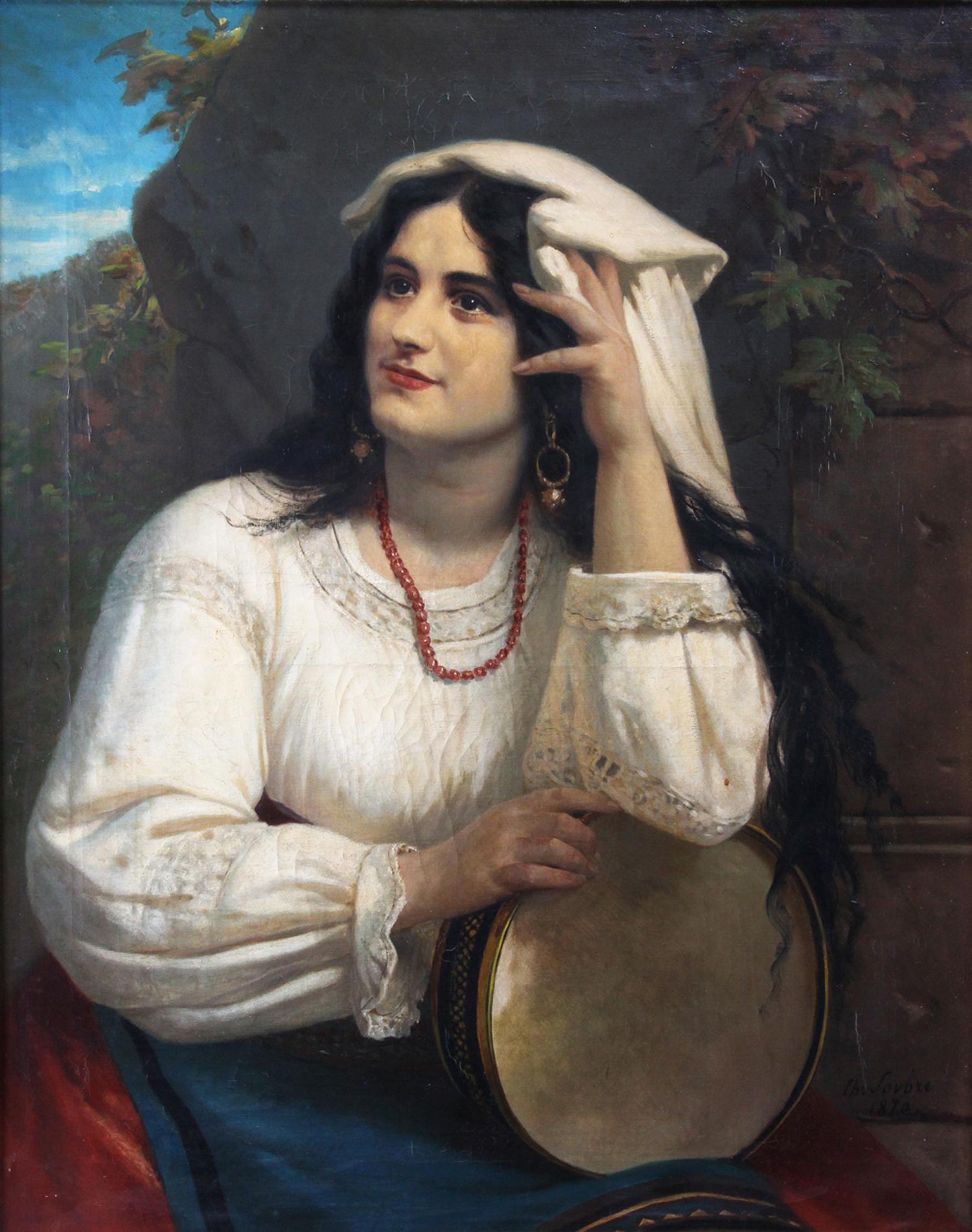
Woman with a Tambourine, 1870 (oil on canvas; 88 cm × 70 cm), private collection

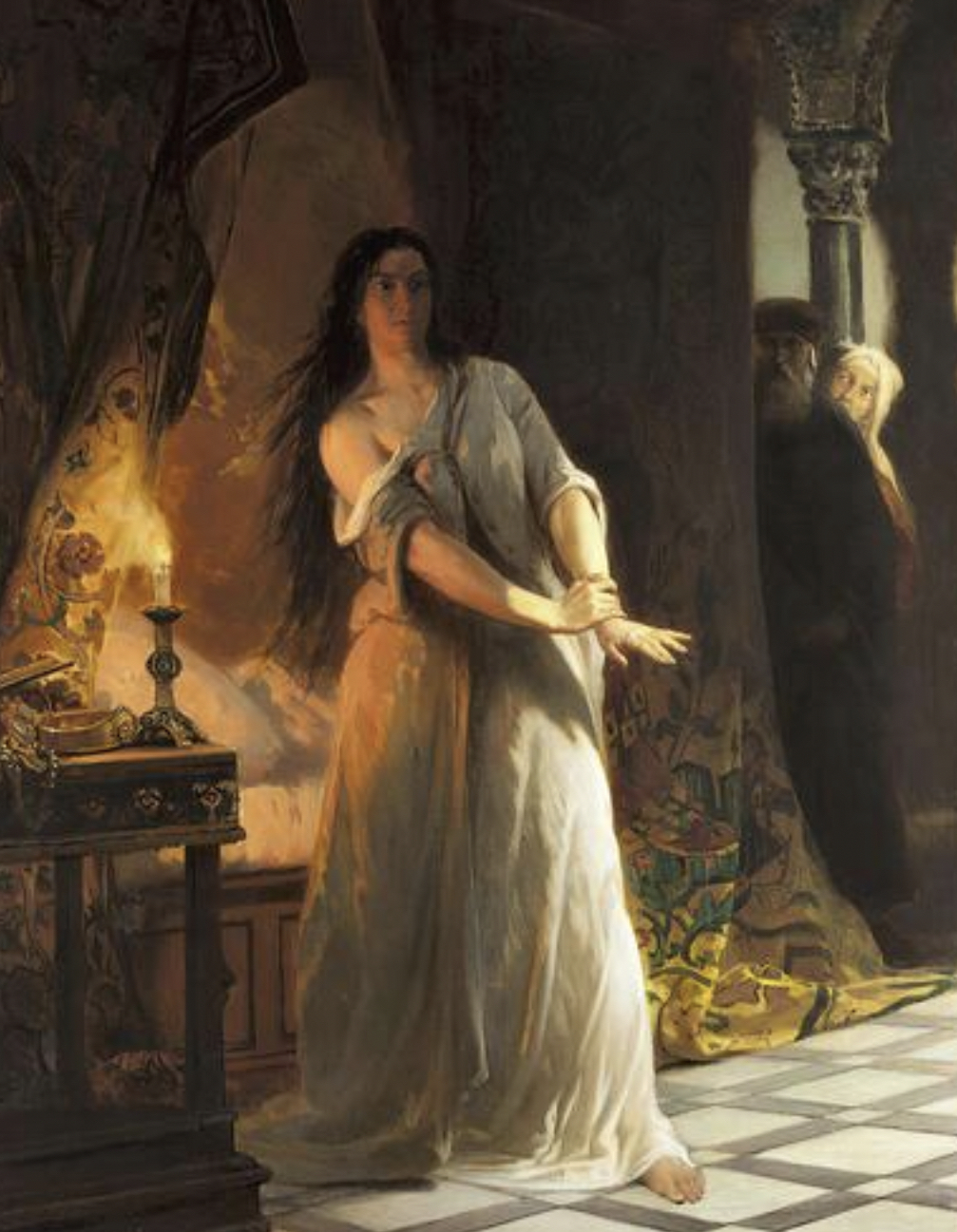
Lady Macbeth, 1877 (oil on canvas; 114 cm × 85 cm), private collection

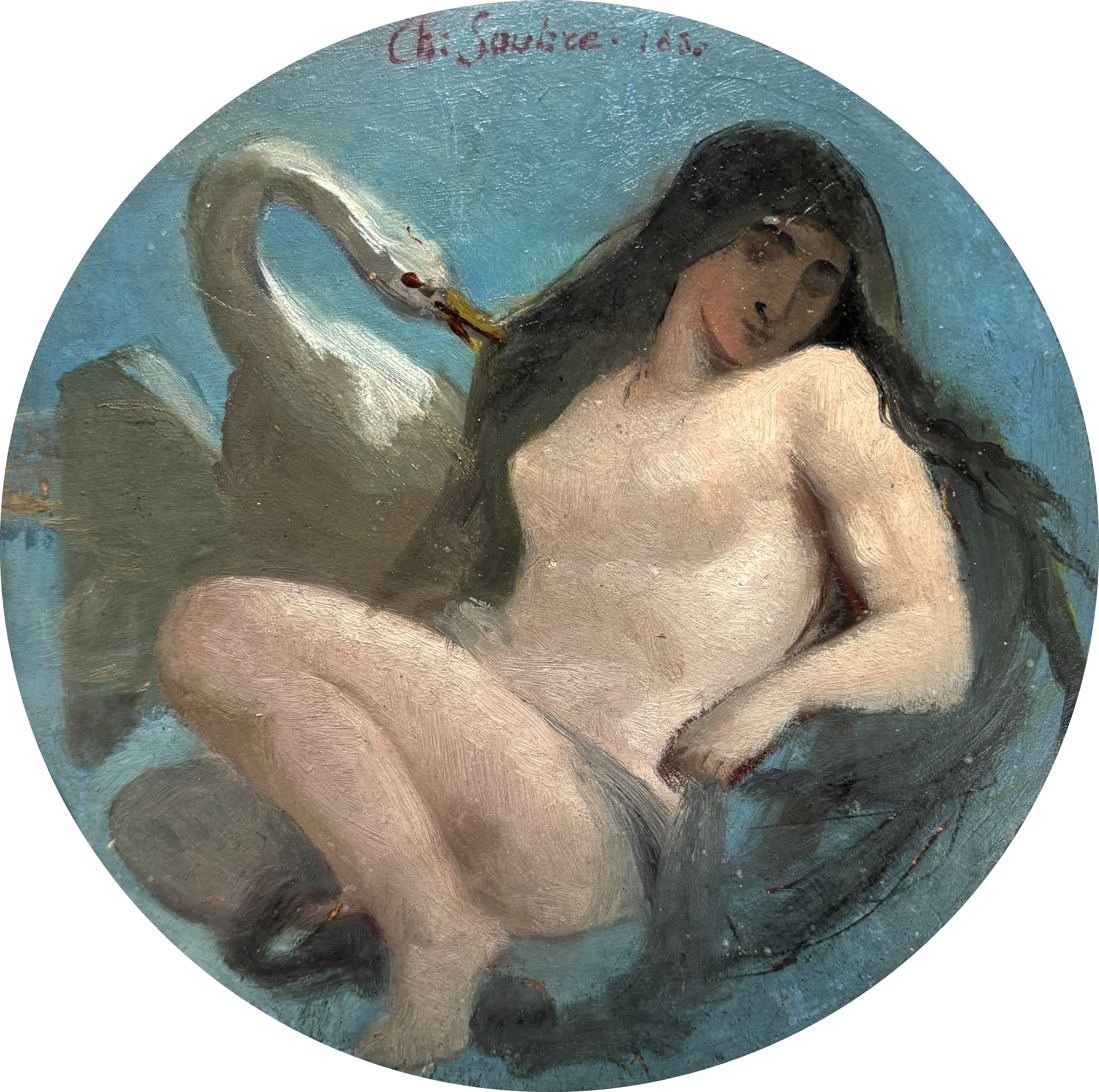
Leda and the Swan, 1880 (oil on panel; diameter 19 cm), private collection

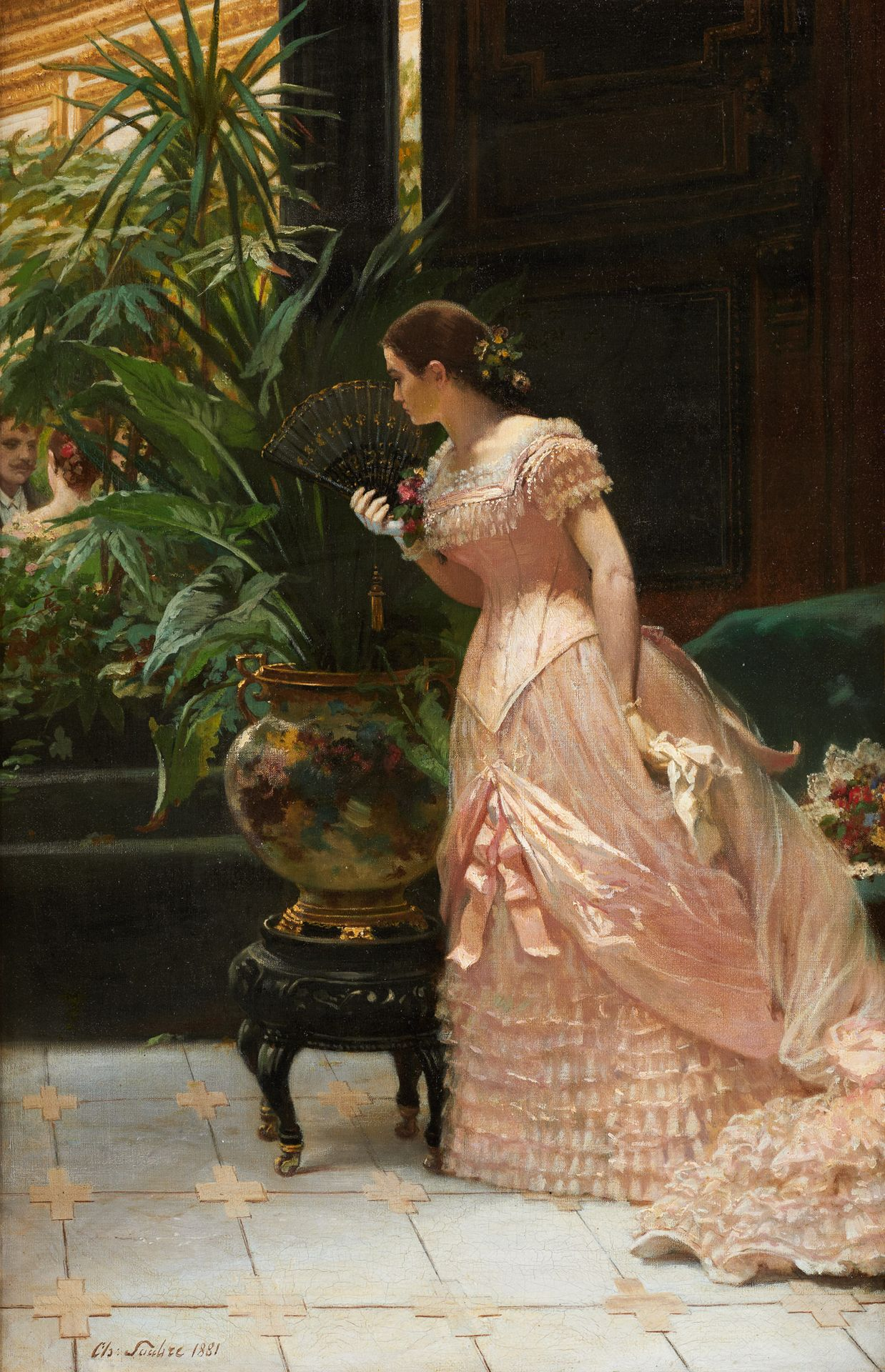
The Indiscreet One, 1881 (oil on canvas; 69 cm × 45 cm), private collection

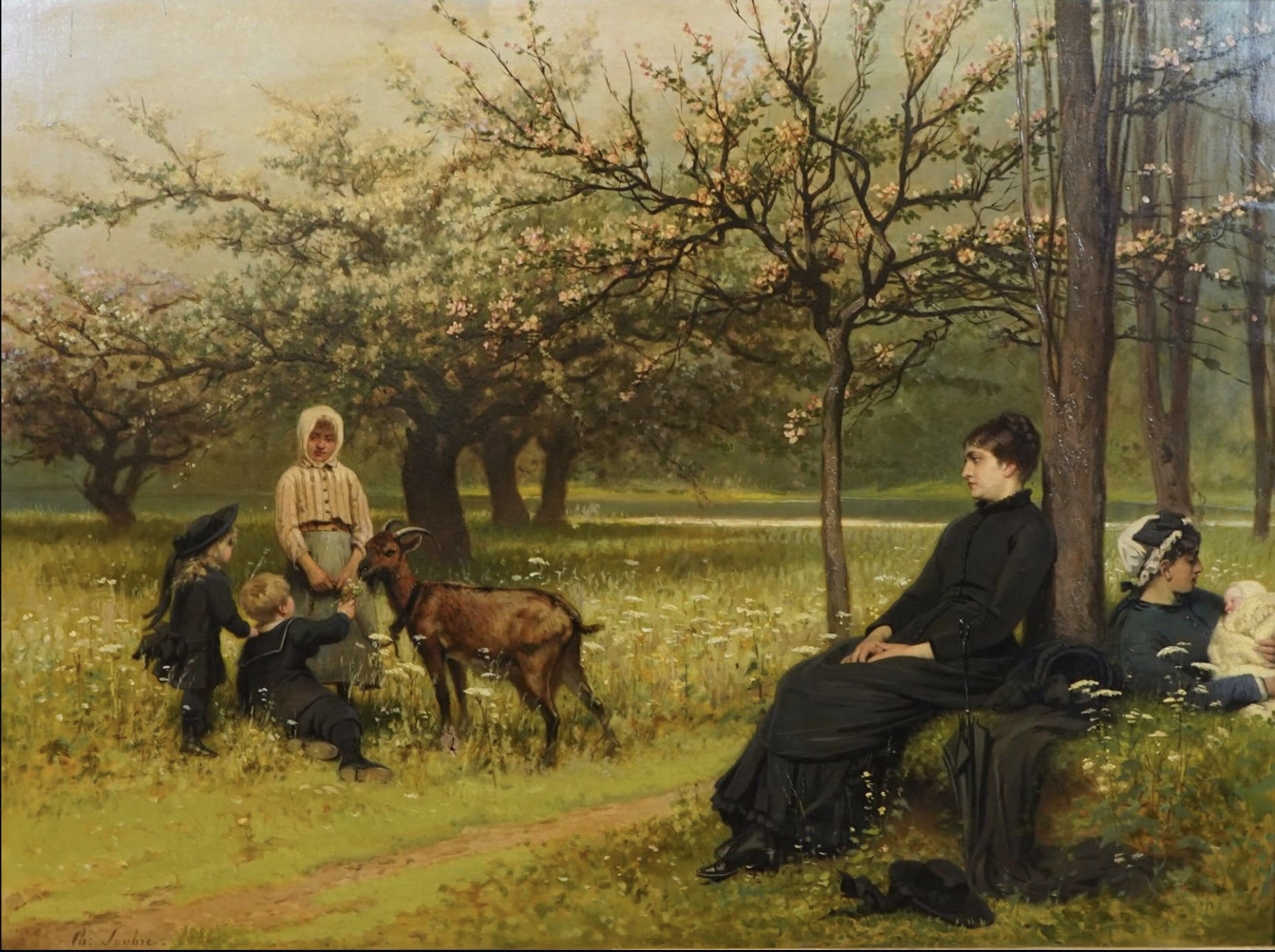
The Widow, 1884 (oil on canvas; 85 cm × 120 cm), private collection

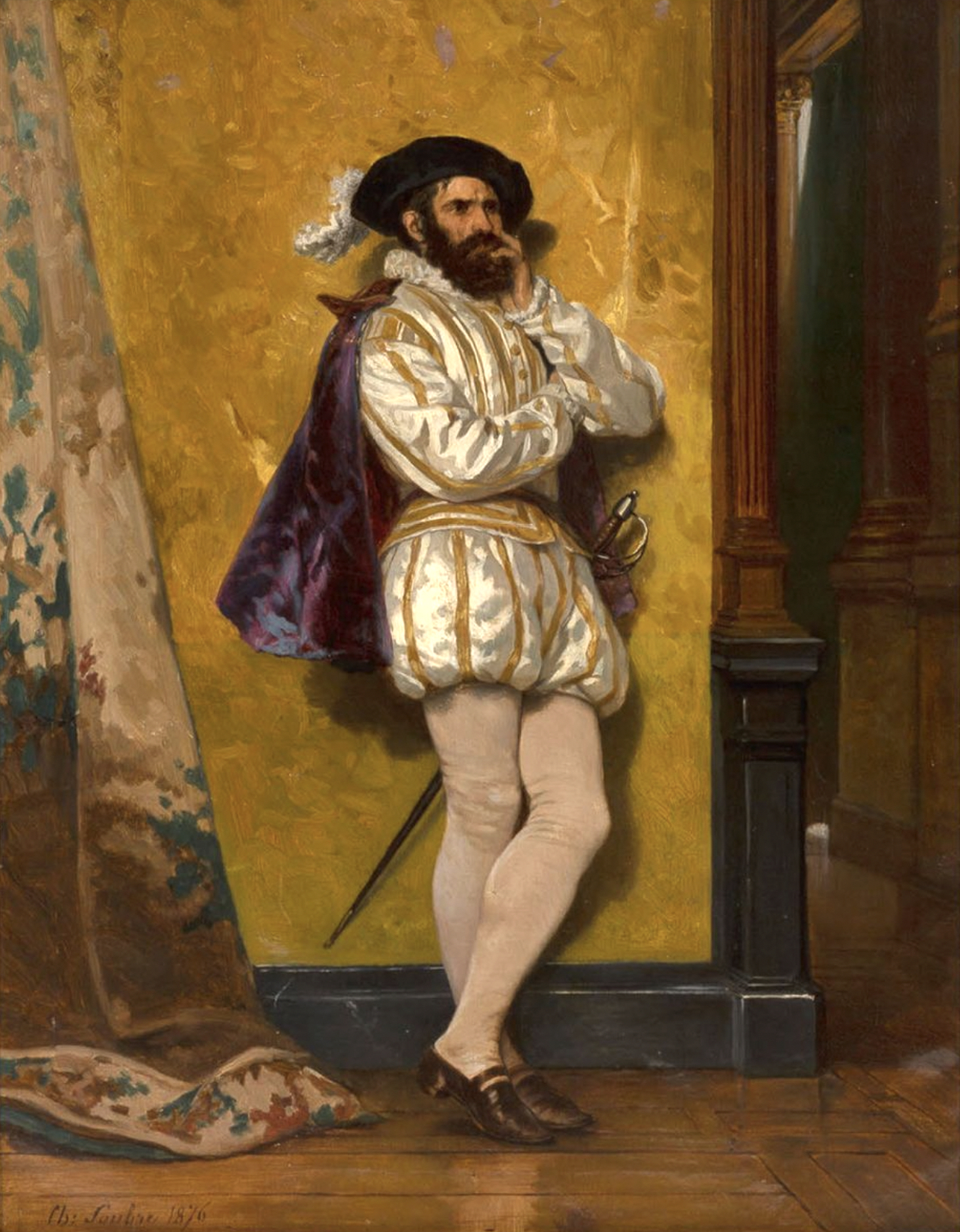
A Gentleman under Henry III, 1876 (oil on canvas; 62.5 cm × 47.5 cm), private collection

== Teaching ==
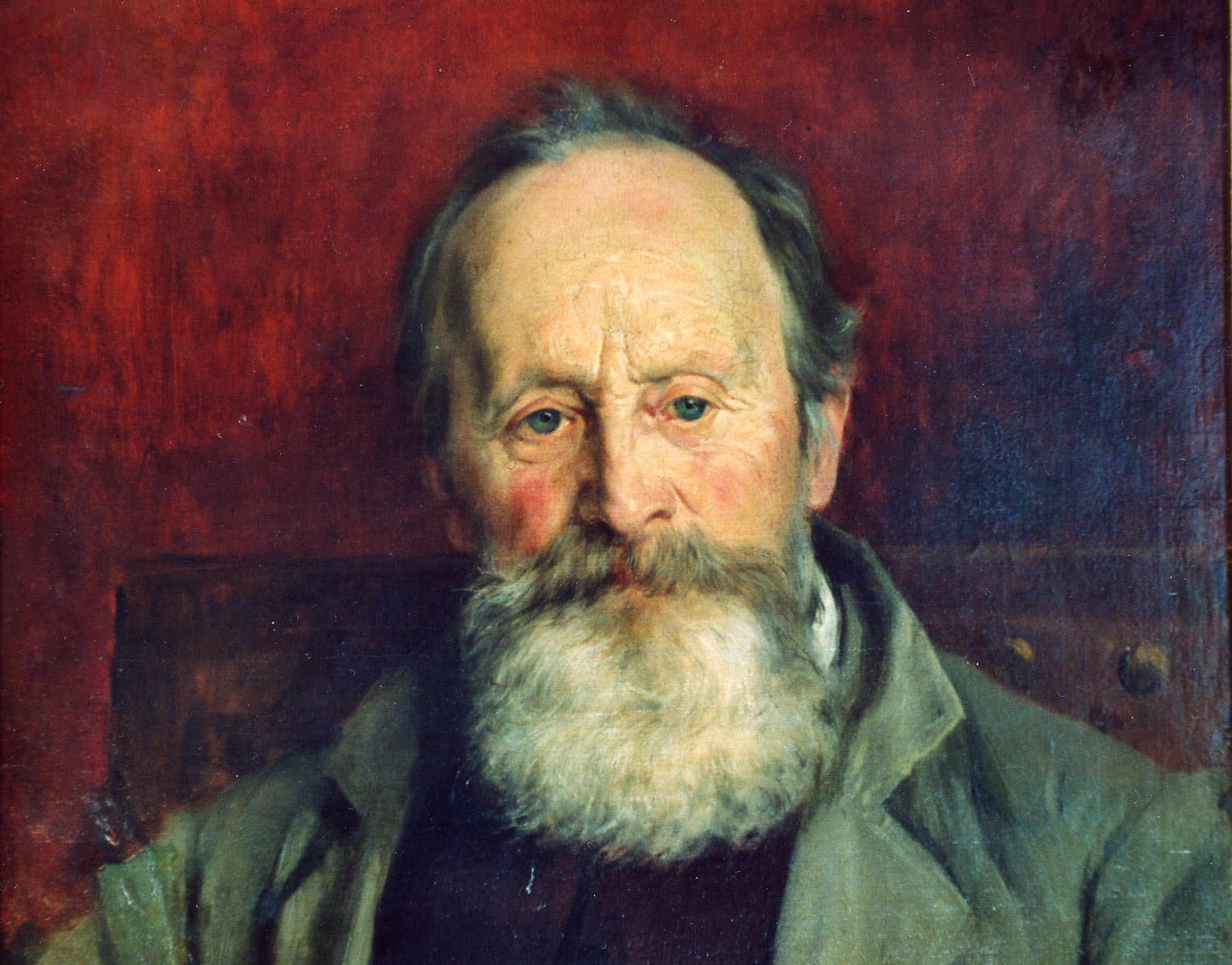
Émile Delperée, Portrait of Charles Soubre, c. 1890

At the celebration organised by his former pupils on 27 June 1889, Soubre was presented with a commemorative album of 42 drawings. The presentation address noted that his 36-year teaching career alone would constitute his glory, even were the artist's less brilliant.

=== Notable pupils ===
- Ludovic Baues (1864–1937)
- Émile Berchmans (1867–1947)
- Henri Berchmans (1856–1911)
- Oscar Berchmans (1869–1950)
- Émile Delperée (1850–1896)
- Jérémie Delsaux (1852–1927)
- Adrien de Witte (1850–1935)
- Edgar D'Hont (1861–1941)
- Auguste Donnay (1862–1921)
- François Maréchal (1861–1945)
- Ernest Marneffe (1866–1920)
- Alphonse Mataive (1856–1946)
- Léon Mignon (1847–1898)
- Félix Nisen (1850–1889)
- Léon Philippet (1843–1906)
- Joseph Rulot (1853–1919)
- Henri Simon (1856–1939)
- Alphonse Taïée (1846–1887)
- Émile Ubaghs (1844–1879)
- Jean Ubaghs (1852–1937)

== Exhibitions ==
=== During the artist's lifetime ===
To avoid an excessively long listing, only key venues are recorded below. Soubre appeared at the Brussels Salon sixteen times between 1839 and 1884, the Antwerp Salon nine times between 1840 and 1879, and the Ghent Salon ten times between 1844 and 1895. He also exhibited at various Liège salons, the Paris Salon (1861 and 1863), the London International Exhibitions (1872, 1873, 1874), the Vienna World's Fair (1873), the Philadelphia Centennial Exposition (1876), the Sydney International Exhibition (1879–1880), the Historical Exhibition of Belgian Art (1880), and the Royal Circle of Fine Arts of Liège (1893–1895). A complete list of his known exhibition appearances follows below; it is compiled primarily from contemporary Salon catalogues and press notices.

Full list of exhibitions during the artist's lifetime
- 1839: Brussels Salon, 1 September – 1 November, former apartments of the Palace of Charles of Lorraine, Brussels (Sunken Lane near Liège).
- 1840: Antwerp Salon, 1 August – 15 September, rue Vénus, Antwerp (View of the Banks of the Aîne in the Ardennes).
- 1842: Brussels Salon, 22 August – 6 November, former apartments of the Palace of Charles of Lorraine, Brussels (Landscape; Souvenir of the Ardennes).
- 1844: 19th triennial salon – Ghent Salon, 30 June – 12 August, Palace of Justice, Ghent (The Return from Palestine).
- 1845: Brussels Salon, 15 August – 6 October, former apartments of the Palace of Charles of Lorraine, Brussels (The Return from Palestine).
- 1846: Antwerp Salon, 1 August – 15 September, rue Vénus, Antwerp (View Taken in the Valley of Lauterbrunnen, Canton of Bern).
- 1848: Brussels Salon, 15 August – 2 October (Henri de Dinant, Liège Tribune Departing for Exile).
- 1850: Liège Salon, May–June, Société d'Émulation, Liège (Death of Henry IV, German Emperor).
- 1851: Brussels Salon, 15 August – 31 October (The Awakening of Montaigne).
- 1852: Antwerp Salon, 8 August – 19 September, rue Vénus, Antwerp (The Awakening of Montaigne).
- 1854: Brussels Salon, 6 August – 1 November (The Last Boatload of Hay).
- 1855: Antwerp Salon, 12 August – 30 September, rue Vénus, Antwerp (Angelica and the Enchanted Horse).
- 1857: Brussels Salon, 1 September – 15 November (Dream of an Arab Chief).
- 1858: Liège Salon.
- 1860: Liège Salon, May–June; Brussels Salon, 18 August – 1 November (The Madness of Ophelia).
- 1861: Paris Salon (Dream of an Arab Chief).
- 1862: Liège Salon, May–June, Société d'Émulation (second version of The Awakening of Montaigne).
- 1863: Paris Salon (Saint Vincent de Paul Attending the Dying Louis XIII and Saint Vincent de Paul Among the Daughters of Charity); Brussels Salon, 3 August – 15 October (Provenzano Salvani Begging for his Friend's Ransom).
- 1864: Liège Salon, April–May (Ardenne Poachers in the St Jean Forest); Antwerp Salon, 7 August – 2 October (Ardenne Poachers in the St Jean Forest).
- 1865: 26th national and triennial exhibition – Ghent Salon, 15 August – September (The Horror of Cold Water).
- 1866: Brussels Salon, 9 August – 21 October (Victor Pisani).
- 1867: Antwerp Salon, 11 August – 6 October (Execution of Pierre de Bex, Former Mayor of Liège and Ardenne Shepherd; Autumn Squall).
- 1868: Exhibition of the Union of Artists, July, Liège (two genre scenes and Victor Pisani); 27th national and triennial exhibition – Ghent Salon, 13 September – October (Good Friday and Poachers Lying in Wait).
- 1869: Liège Salon, April–May (First Prayer and Notched Sword); Brussels Salon, 29 July – 27 October, greenhouses of the former botanical garden, Brussels (The Banquet of the Beggars).
- 1871: 28th national and triennial exhibition – Ghent Salon, 10 September – 14 November (Proud Humility and Premonition).
- 1872: Brussels Salon, 15 August – 3 November (Mary Stuart); London International Exhibition, Royal Albert Hall (Proud Humility).
- 1873: Vienna World's Fair, 1 May – 1 November (A Noble Family Before the Council of Troubles); Antwerp Salon, 10 August – 5 October (Jeanne the Sulker, Bohemian Woman and Ardenne Shepherd Struck by Lightning); London International Exhibition, Royal Albert Hall (Mary Stuart and The Last Days of Queen Elizabeth I).
- 1874: 29th triennial exhibition – Ghent Salon, 30 August – 18 October (Cromwell and his Daughter Lady Claypole); London International Exhibition, Royal Albert Hall (Catherine of Aragon and Cardinal Wolsey and A Noble Family Before the Council of Troubles).
- 1875: Liège Salon, April–May (A Noble Family Before the Council of Troubles); Brussels Salon, 23 August – 15 November (A Burial in the Ardennes).
- 1876: Philadelphia Centennial Exposition, 10 May – 10 November (La Måle Saint-Martin); Antwerp Salon, 13 August – 1 October (The Banquet of the Beggars and Cromwell and his Daughter Lady Claypole).
- 1877: 30th triennial exhibition – Ghent Salon, 26 August – 2 November (La Måle Saint-Martin, Lady Macbeth and The Snub).
- 1878: Brussels Salon, 5 September – 3 November (The 4th of September 1830, also known as The Departure of the Liège Volunteers for Brussels Led by Charles Rogier).
- 1879: Liège Salon, 25 April – 28 May (The 4th of September 1830); Antwerp Salon, 10 August – 1 October (A Burial in the Ardennes and Resentment); Exhibition of the Artistic Circle, December, casino hall of the Passage Lemonnier, Liège.
- 1879–1880: Sydney International Exhibition, 18 September 1879 – June 1880 (The Notched Sword); Exhibition of drawings, watercolours and sketches, Artistic and Literary Circle of Liège, 25 December 1879 – 2 January 1880.
- 1880: 31st triennial exhibition – Ghent Salon, 15 August – 2 November (Happiness); Circle Artistic Festival, August, Artistic and Literary Circle of Brussels; Historical Exhibition of Belgian Art 1830–1880, 1 August – 31 October, Royal Museums of Fine Arts of Belgium, Brussels (The 4th of September 1830 and A Noble Family Before the Council of Troubles).
- 1881: Brussels Salon, 14 August – 16 September (Jealousy).
- 1883: 32nd triennial exhibition – Ghent Salon, 26 August – 4 November (Weariness and Study of a Head).
- 1884: Brussels Salon, 1 September – 1 November (The Widow).
- 1889: 34th triennial exhibition – Ghent Salon, 11 August – 6 October (Sunday Morning in the Ardennes and Javanese Woman Teasing a Cat).
- 1892: Liège Salon, 8 May – 4 June, festival hall and foyer of the Royal Conservatory of Liège (pastel portrait).
- 1893–1895: various exhibitions at the Royal Circle of Fine Arts of Liège.

=== Posthumous exhibitions ===
- 1895: Charles Soubre Retrospective, March–April, Emulation Hall, Liège; Inaugural Exhibition of the Academy of Fine Arts, 15–29 July, rue des Anglais 21, Liège; 36th triennial exhibition – Ghent Salon, 1 September – 28 October (posthumous showing of the pastel Young Girl at the Fountain).
- 1955: Romanticism in the Country of Liège, 10 September – 31 October, Museum of Fine Arts, Liège.
- 1964: 125th Anniversary of the Royal Academy of Fine Arts, 11 April – 10 May, Museum of Fine Arts, Liège.
- 1992: The Royal Circle of Fine Arts of Liège 1892–1992, 18 September – 6 October, Royal Circle of Fine Arts, Liège (catalogue no. 21, Ardennes Landscape).
- 2001–2002: Towards Modernity: the 19th Century in the Country of Liège, 5 October 2001 – 20 January 2002, Museum of Walloon Art and Saint-Georges Hall, Liège (The Departure of the Liège Volunteers for Brussels Led by Charles Rogier, The Arrival of Charles Rogier and the Liège Volunteers in Brussels, and The Indonesian Woman with the Parasol).
- 2012: Spirituality, 9 June – 1 July, Rue des Prémontrés 38, Liège.
- 2018: Liège School of Landscape (1880–1950), 1 August – 2 September, Fléron; Liège School of Landscape, 27 October – 18 November, Saint-Hubert.
- 2019: Paintings of Fishing and Rivers, 6–28 July, Chapel of the Sépulcrines, Visé.
- 2021: June 2021 at the Office… Still More Heintz, 5 June – 4 July, Rue Henri Vieuxtemps 13, Liège (The Beggar Girl).
- 2024: Quaestus: Art Acquisitions at the Treasury of Liège, 4 July – 6 October, Treasury of Liège Cathedral (The Holy Family, 1862).

== Awards ==
- 1866: gold medal at the Brussels Salon for Victor Pisani.
- 1879: Knight of the Order of Leopold (7 February).
- 1880: bronze medal at the Sydney International Exhibition.

== See also ==
- Étienne Soubre, his brother, a composer

== Bibliography ==
=== Exhibition catalogues ===
- Jean-Patrick Duchesne, ed. (1 October 2001). Vers la modernité: le XIXe siècle au pays de Liège (Catalogue of the exhibition organised at the Museum of Walloon Art and Saint-Georges Hall, Liège, 5 October 2001 – 20 January 2002) (in French). Stavelot: Imprimerie J. Chauveheid. OCLC 66405174.
  - Duchesne, Jean-Patrick (2001). "Les arts plastiques : le cadre institutionnel". Vers la modernité : le XIXe siècle au pays de Liège (in French). pp. 48–53.
  - Bronze, David (2001). "Les arts plastiques : la peinture, le dessin et l'estampe". Vers la modernité : le XIXe siècle au pays de Liège (in French). pp. 54–77.
  - Dominique, Fanny; Quantin, Bruno (2001b). "Notices : Historique — 17. Soubre Charles Le Départ des volontaires liégeois pour Bruxelles (1878)". Vers la modernité : le XIXe siècle au pays de Liège (in French). p. 308.
  - Dominique, Fanny; Quantin, Bruno (2001c). "Notices : Historique — 18. Soubre Charles L'Arrivée de Charles Rogier et des volontaires liégeois à Bruxelles (1880)". Vers la modernité : le XIXe siècle au pays de Liège (in French). p. 308.
  - Léonard, Estelle (2001). "Notices : Les arts plastiques — 147. Soubre Charles L'Indonésienne à l'ombrelle". Vers la modernité : le XIXe siècle au pays de Liège (in French). p. 343.
  - Dominique, Fanny; Quantin, Bruno (2001). "Biographies — Soubre Charles (Liège, 1821–1895)". Vers la modernité : le XIXe siècle au pays de Liège (in French). p. 519.
- Exposition historique de l'art belge 1830–1880: Catalogue (in French). Brussels: Imprimerie Félix Callewaert père. 1880.
- Liliane Sabatini, ed. (2000). Un double regard sur 2000 ans d'art wallon (Book accompanying the exhibition presented in various Liège institutions, 15 April – 16 July 2000) (in French). Tournai: La Renaissance du Livre; Crédit Communal. ISBN 978-2-8046-0376-2. OCLC 249111529.
  - Le Bailly de Tilleghem, Serge (2000). "Des peintres wallons du XIXe siècle". Un double regard sur 2000 ans d'art wallon (in French). pp. 358–371.
- Pierre Somville; Marie-Christine Depouhon; Gilbert Depouhon (1992). Le Cercle royal des Beaux Arts de Liège 1892–1992 (in French). Brussels: Crédit Communal. OCLC 35121530.

=== Museum catalogues ===
- Régine Rémon, ed. (2016). Catalogue du Musée des beaux-arts de Liège (in French). Vol. 1. Liège: Raymond Vervinckt & Fils. ISBN 978-90-8252-100-9. OCLC 972161089.
  - Desauvage, Grégory (2016). "Charles Soubre — Le Départ des volontaires liégeois pour Bruxelles sous la conduite de Charles Rogier 1878". Catalogue du musée des beaux-arts de Liège (in French). pp. 148–149.
- City of Liège (1926). Musée des beaux-arts: catalogue (in French). Liège: Imprimerie Bénard. p. 69 (Soubre, Charles). OCLC 27249817.

=== Dictionaries ===
- Dictionnaire des peintres belges du XIVe siècle à nos jours (in French). Vol. 2. Brussels: La Renaissance du Livre. 1995. ISBN 2-8041-2012-0. OCLC 301497369.
  - Josse, Micheline (1995). "Soubre, Charles". Dictionnaire des peintres belges (in French). pp. 918–919.
- Goijen, Jacques (2014). Dictionnaire des peintres de l'École liégeoise du paysage (in French). Liège: École liégeoise du paysage Éditions. pp. 564–565. ISBN 9782960045901. OCLC 980910178.
- Paul Piron (2003–2006). Dictionnaire des artistes plasticiens de Belgique des XIXe et XXe siècles (in French). Vol. 2. Ohain - Lasne: Éditions Art in Belgium. p. 454. ISBN 2-930338-11-3. OCLC 493737398.

=== Art books and articles ===
- Bosmant, Jules (1930). La peinture et la sculpture au pays de Liège de 1793 à nos jours (in French). Liège: Mawet éditeur. OCLC 458651068.
- Delaite, Philippe; Depaire, Jean-Paul (2019). L'Académie royale des Beaux-Arts de Liège une école d'art sur quatre siècles (in French). Liège: Éditions du Perron. ISBN 9782871142614. OCLC 1400269380.
- Rita Lejeune; Jacques Stiennon, eds. (1978). La Wallonie. Le Pays et les Hommes. Lettres-arts-culture (in French). Vol. II. Brussels: La Renaissance du livre. OCLC 70306409.
  - Marchal, André (1978). "La peinture : le paysage en Wallonie au XIXe siècle". La Wallonie. Le Pays et les Hommes (PDF) (in French). pp. 527–544.
- Julien Maquet (July–December 2024). "Cinq années d'acquisitions au Trésor de Liège" (PDF). Bulletin semestriel du Trésor de Liège (in French) (71). Liège: Treasury of Liège Cathedral: 1–27. ISSN 2295-6751.
- Sabatini, Liliane (1988). Le Musée de l'Art wallon (in French). Brussels: Ministère de la Communauté française de Belgique et Crédit Communal de Belgique. OCLC 231872025.
- Liliane Sabatini; Régine Rémon (2002). Le Musée de l'art wallon et le Cabinet des estampes et des dessins de la ville de Liège (in French). Brussels; Tournai: Dexia; La Renaissance du Livre. ISBN 9782871932987. OCLC 493455007.
