= Étienne Soubre =

Belgian field hockey player

Personal information
- Nationality: Belgian
- Born: 13 March 1903

Sport
- Sport: Field hockey

Étienne Soubre (born 13 March 1903, date of death unknown) was a Belgian field hockey player. He competed in the men's tournament at the 1928 Summer Olympics.
