= 1796 in art =

Events from the year 1796 in art.

== Events ==
- Printing by lithography is invented by Alois Senefelder in Bohemia.
- Ann Jemima Provis and her father Thomas Provis perpetrate the Venetian secret scandal where they falsely claim to have found a document describing Renaissance-era painting methods. A number of prominent artists are fooled, most notably Benjamin West.

== Works ==
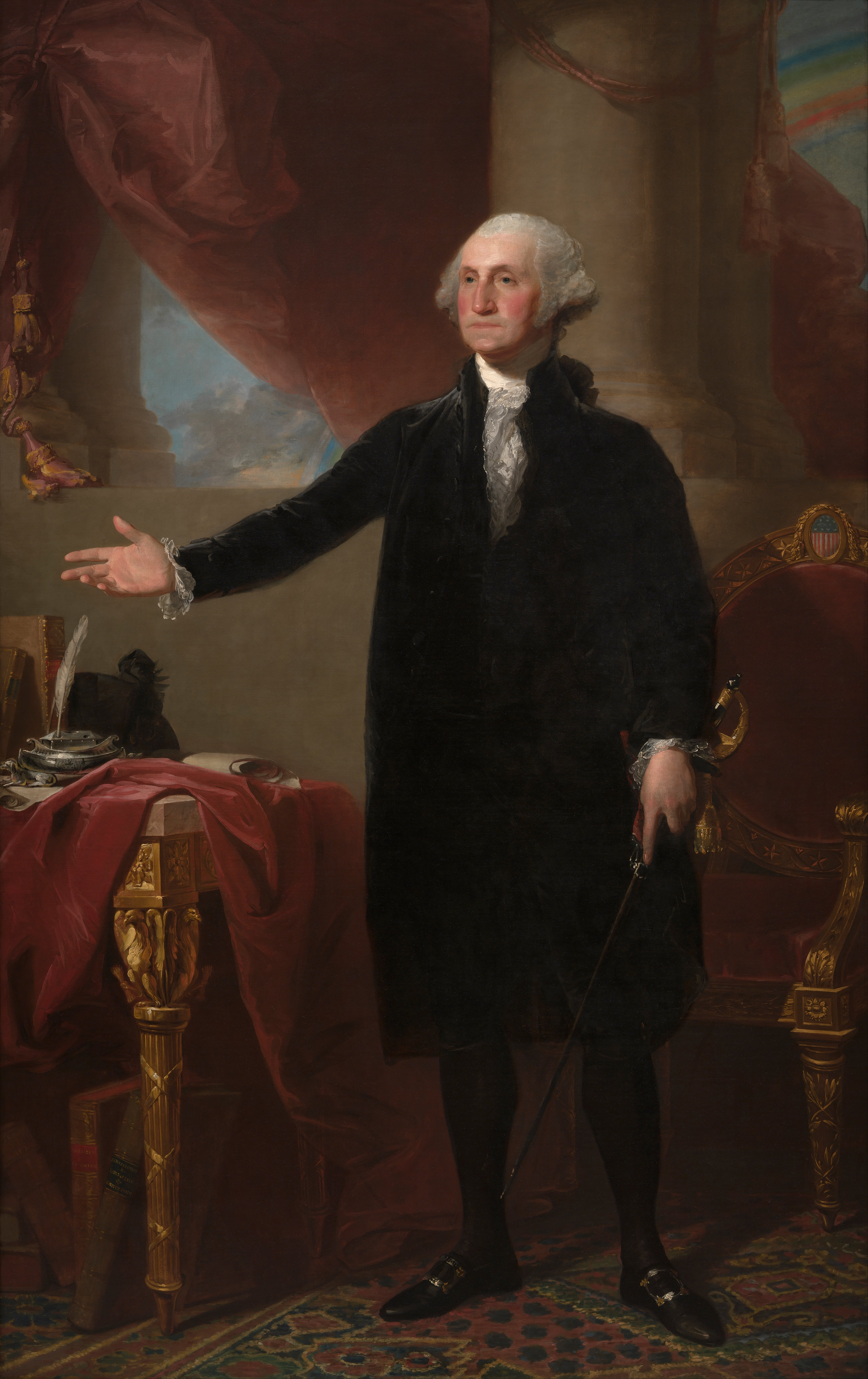
Lansdowne Portrait of George Washington by Gilbert Stuart

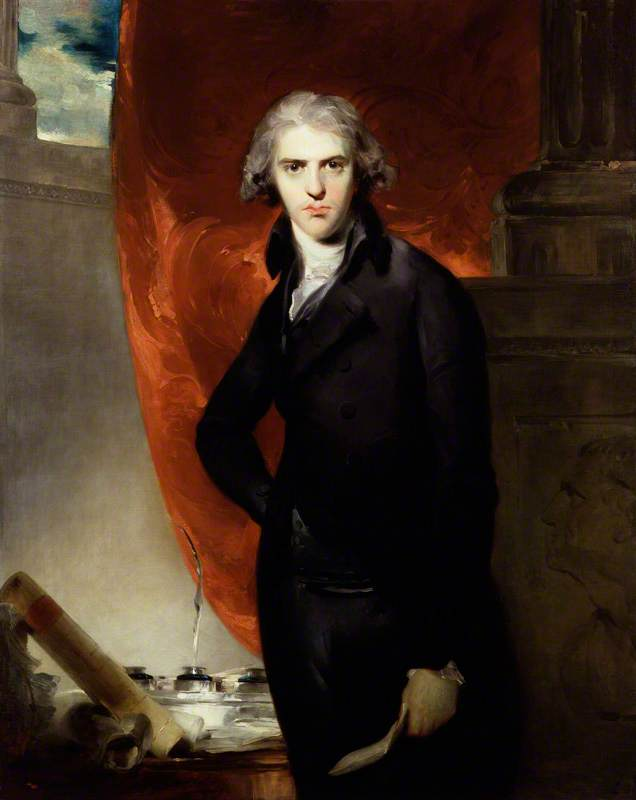
Young Lord Liverpool by Thomas Lawrence.

- Henry Fuseli – The Night-Hag visiting the Lapland Witches
- Anton Graff – George Leopold Gogel
- Antoine-Jean Gros
  - Bonaparte at the Pont d'Arcole
  - Portrait of the Maistre Sisters
- Hugh Douglas Hamilton – Lord Edward Fitzgerald
- John Hoppner – Portrait of William Lamb
- Thomas Lawrence
  - Portrait of the Duke of Leeds
  - Portrait of Lord Hawkesbury
  - The Children of John Julius Angerstein
- Philip James de Loutherbourg – Defeat of the Spanish Armada
- Henry Raeburn – Rev. Alexander Carlyle
- Edward Savage – The Washington Family
- Gilbert Stuart – Lansdowne Portrait of George Washington
- J. M. W. Turner – Fishermen at Sea (his first oil painting to be exhibited at the Royal Academy)
- Élisabeth Vigée Le Brun - Portrait of Countess Yekaterina von Engelhardt

== Births ==
- February 3 – Jean-Baptiste Madou, Belgian painter and lithographer (died 1877)
- February 5 – Pieter Godfried Bertichen, Dutch painter and lithographer (died 1856)
- May 24 – Étienne-Jules Ramey, French sculptor and teacher (died 1852)
- May 28 – William Miller, Scottish Quaker line engraver (died 1882)
- June 27 (bapt.) – George Vincent, English landscape painter of the Norwich School (died c. 1832)
- June 30 – Antonin Moine, French romantic sculptor (died 1849)
- July 2 – Michael Thonet, German-born furniture designer (died 1871)
- July 3 – Maria Martin, American watercolor painter (died 1863)
- July 17 – Jean-Baptiste-Camille Corot, French painter (died 1875)
- July 26 – George Catlin, American painter specializing in portraits of Native Americans in the Old West (died 1872)
- August 21 – Asher Brown Durand, American painter of the Hudson River School (died 1886)
- August 30 – Julien-Léopold Boilly, French draughtsman and watercolorist (died 1874)
- September 4 – Peter Fendi, Austrian portrait and genre painter, engraver and lithographer (died 1842)
- September 5 – Jacobus Cornelis Gaal, Dutch painter and etcher (died 1866)
- September 24 – Antoine-Louis Barye, French sculptor (died 1875)
- October 9 – Joseph Bonomi the Younger, English sculptor, artist, Egyptologist and museum curator (died 1878)
- October 19 – Carl Wagner, German romantic landscape painter (died 1867)
- October 24 – David Roberts, Scottish painter (died 1864)
- October 30 – Wilhelm August Rieder, Austrian painter and draughtsman (died 1880)
- November 4 – John Neagle, American portrait painter (died 1865)
- date unknown
  - Gilles-François Closson, Belgian landscape painter (died 1842)
  - Joseph Farey, English mechanical engineer and draughtsman (died 1829)
  - Giovanni Paolo Lasinio, Italian engraver (died 1855)
  - Achille Etna Michallon, French landscape painter (died 1822)
  - Marcin Zaleski, Polish painter (died 1877)
  - Charles C. Ingham, Irish portrait painter and later founder of the New York National Academy of Design (died 1863)
- probable – John Ternouth, English sculptor (died 1848)

== Deaths ==
- March 9 – Saverio Gandini, Italian painter (born 1729)
- March 29 – Johan Philip Korn, Swedish painter (born 1728)
- April 2 – Ulrika Pasch, Swedish miniaturist painter (born 1735)
- August 6 – David Allan, Scottish painter of historical subjects (born 1744)
- August 8 – Franz Anton Maulbertsch, Austrian painter (born 1724)
- September 3 – Louis Jean-Jacques Durameau, French painter and winner of the Grand prix de Rome (born 1733)
- November 2 – Domenico Pozzi, Swiss painter (born 1745)
- November 12 – Margareta Christina Giers, Swedish painter (born 1731)
- December 29 – Miguel Verdiguier, French sculptor (born 1706)
- date unknown
  - Walter Beekerk, Dutch painter (born 1756)
  - John Frederick Miller, English illustrator (born 1759)
  - Hugh Robinson, British history and portrait painter (born 1756)
- probable – Francesco Battaglioli, Italian painter of veduta and capriccios (born 1722)
