= 1756 in art =

Events from the year 1756 in art.

== Events ==
- Richard Trevor, Prince Bishop of Durham, acquires 13 paintings by Francisco de Zurbarán depicting the patriarch Jacob and 12 of his sons for his palace at Auckland Castle in north east England.

== Paintings ==
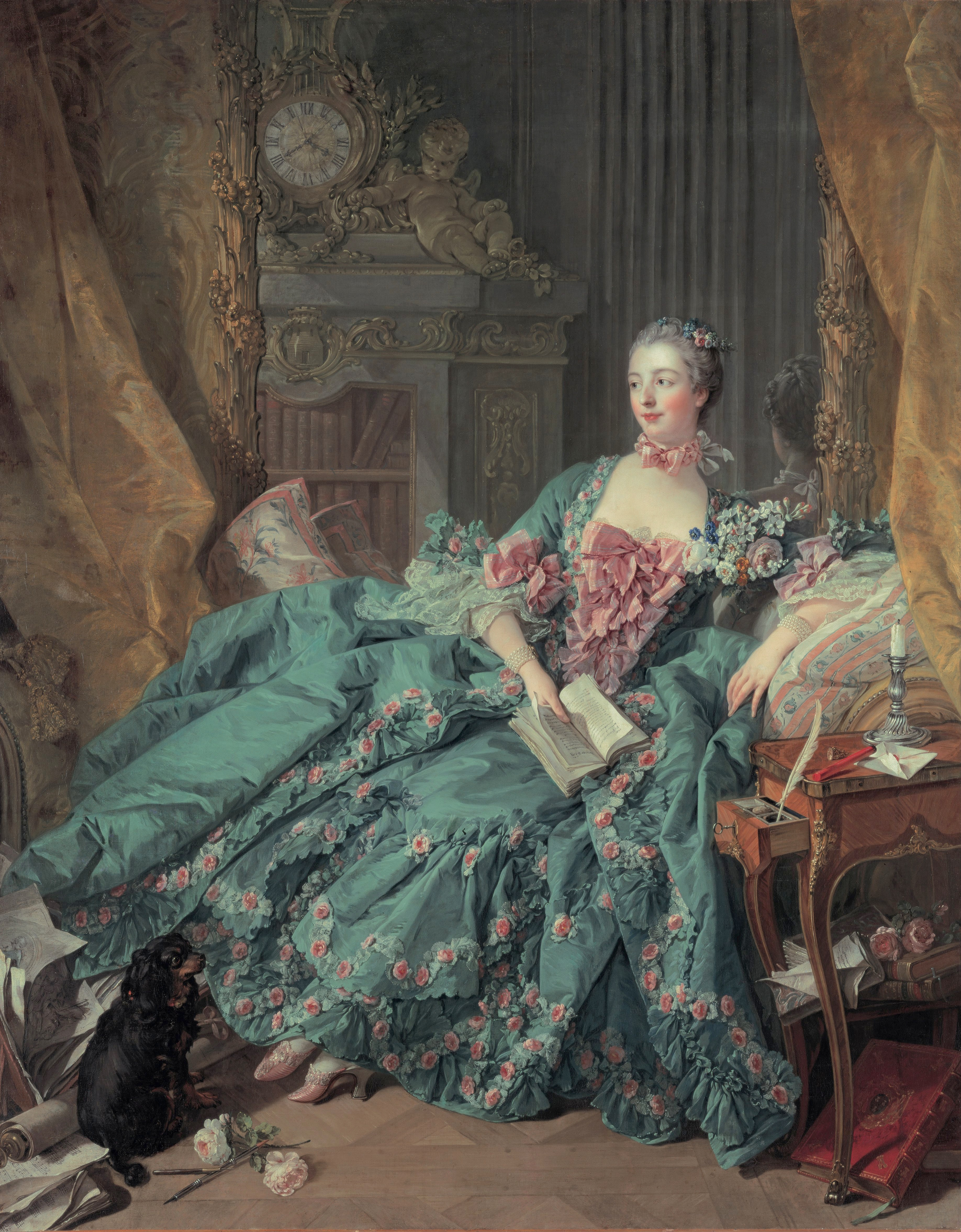
François Boucher – Madame de Pompadour, 1756

- Pompeo Batoni – Portrait of Lord North
- François Boucher – portraits of Madame de Pompadour.
- John Singleton Copley – pictures with Rococo influence.
- Szymon Czechowicz – Bishop Stanislaus bringing back to life Piotrawin.
- Thomas Gainsborough – The Painter's Daughters Chasing a Butterfly
- Thomas Hudson – Portrait of George Frideric Handel
- Joshua Reynolds
  - Portrait of Susanna Beckford
  - Portrait of Robert Orme
  - Portrait of Horace Walpole
- Johan Zoffany – Self-portrait as David with the head of Goliath (approximate date).

== Births ==
- January 6 – Gaspare Landi, Italian Neoclassical painter (died 1830)
- February 12 – Joseph Chinard, French sculptor who worked in a Neoclassical style (died 1813)
- March 4 – Henry Raeburn, Scottish portrait painter (died 1823)
- April 26 – Johann Friedrich Dryander, German-born portrait painter (died 1812)
- May 23 – Charles Clément Balvay, French engraver mainly working in intaglio and exclusively in burin (died 1822)
- June 3 – Louis-François Cassas, French landscape painter, sculptor and architect (died 1827)
- June 6 – John Trumbull, American painter (died 1843)
- July 14 – Thomas Rowlandson, English artist and caricaturist (died 1827)
- August 13 – James Gillray, British caricaturist (died 1815)
- October 22 - Samuel Alken, English sculptor and engraver (died 1815)
- December 7 – Cornelis van Spaendonck, Dutch painter (died 1839)
- December 17 – Edme Quenedey des Ricets, French painter and engraver, especially miniatures (died 1830)
- date unknown
  - Walter Beekerk, Dutch painter (died 1796)
  - Gaspard Duché de Vancy, French painter and drawer (died 1788)
  - Thomas Gaugain, English stipple engraver (died 1812)
  - John Hickey, Irish-born sculptor (died 1795)
  - Grigory Ostrovsky, Russian portraitist (died 1814)
  - Hugh Robinson, British history and portrait painter (died 1796)
  - (b. 1756/1758) – Francesco Piranesi, Italian engraver and architect (died 1810)

== Deaths ==
- January 25 – Christoph Thomas Scheffler, German Rococo painter (born 1699)
- May 2 - John Faber the Younger, Dutch portrait engraver (born c.1695)
- July 24 – George Vertue, English engraver and antiquary (born 1684)
- November 21 – José de Ibarra, Mexican painter (born 1688)
- date unknown
  - Bernard Accama, Dutch painter (born 1697)
  - Egrikapili Mehmed Rasim Efendi, Ottoman calligrapher (born 1687)
  - Li Shan, Chinese painter (born 1686)
  - Hua Yan, Chinese painter from Fujian province (born 1682)
  - Zhang Zongcang, Chinese painter in the Qing Dynasty (born 1686)
