= 1686 in art =

Events from the year 1686 in art.

== Events ==
- Pierre Granier is commissioned to provide a new right arm for the recently discovered Jupiter de Smyrne.
- Bogdan Saltanov becomes head of the painting workshop of the Kremlin Armoury.

== Works ==
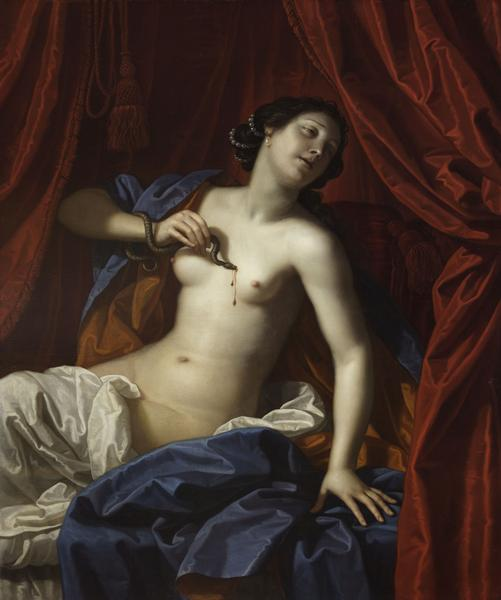
Benedetto Gennari, The Death of Cleopatra, Victoria Art Gallery

- Benedetto Gennari – The Death of Cleopatra
- Jacques Rousseau – Wall paintings at Montagu House, Bloomsbury (now lost)
- (three artists) – Hanging painting of the Avalokitesvara Bodhisattva (Gwaneumbodhisavtta) at the Geumdangsa, South Korea
- (workshop of Grinling Gibbons) – Statue of James II

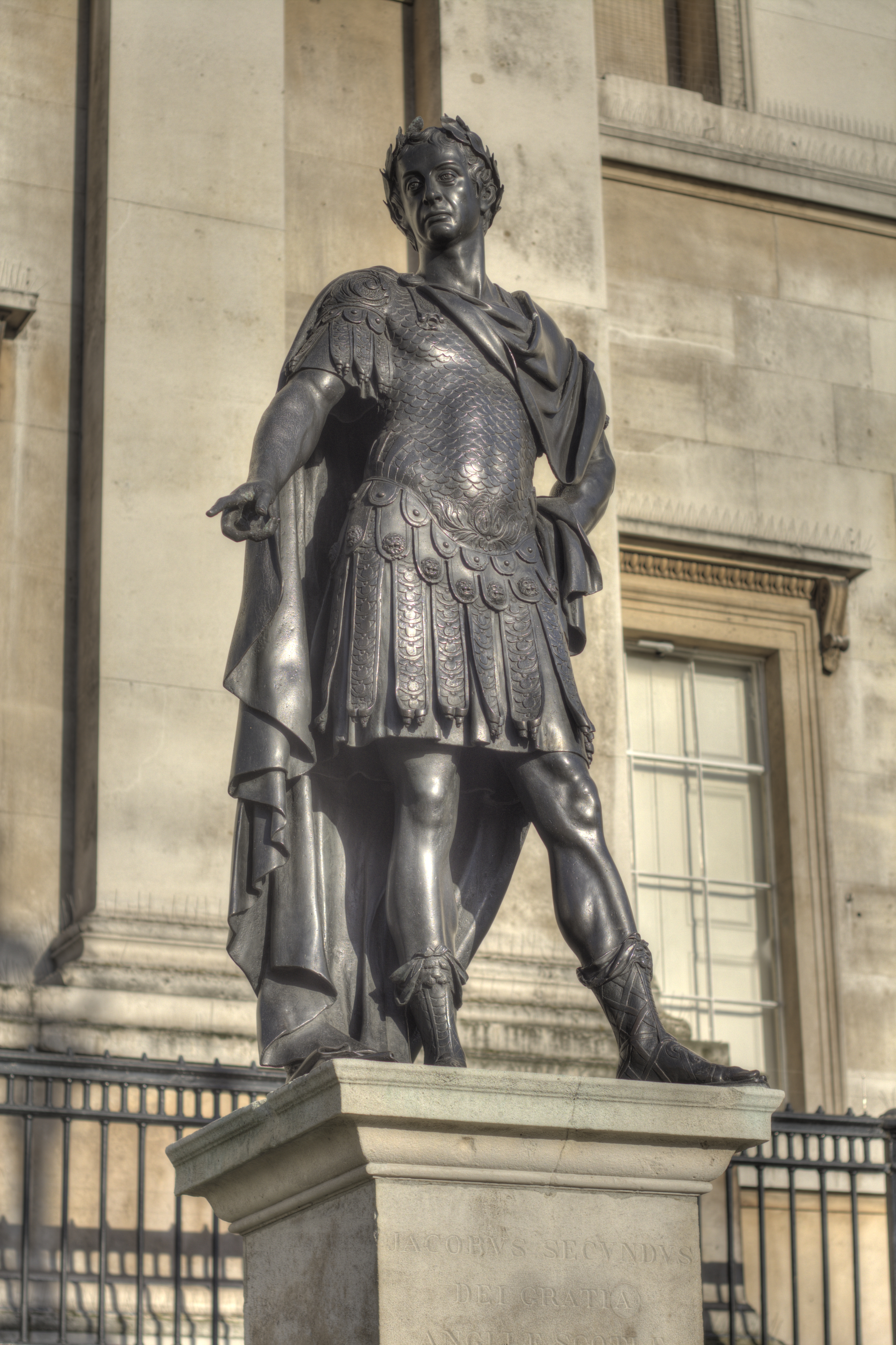
Workshop of Grinling Gibbons, James II

== Births ==
- March 7 – Francesco Antonio Xaverio Grue, Italian potter and painter (died 1746)
- March 17 – Jean-Baptiste Oudry, French Rococo painter, engraver and tapestry designer (died 1755)
- May 30 – Antonina Houbraken, Dutch printmaker and drafter (died 1736)
- August 8 – Wenzel Lorenz Reiner, Czech Baroque painter (died 1743)
- August 18 – Peter von Bemmel, German landscape painter and etcher (died 1754)
- August 27 – Agostino Cornacchini, Italian sculptor and painter (died 1754)
- September 29 – Cosmas Damian Asam, German painter and architect during the late Baroque period (died 1739)
- October 15 – Alessandro Galli Bibiena, Italian architect/painter (died 1748)
- date unknown
  - Gerhard Bockman, Dutch portrait painter and mezzotint engraver (died 1773)
  - Carlo Carlone, Italian painter (died 1775)
  - Antonio Consetti, Italian historical painter (died 1766)
  - Louise-Magdeleine Horthemels, French engraver (died 1767)
  - François Hutin, French painter, sculptor and engraver (died 1758)
  - Giovanni Pietro Ligario, Italian painter of historical pictures for churches and private collections (died 1748)
  - Okumura Masanobu, Japanese print designer, book publisher and painter (died 1764)
  - Wang Shishen, Chinese painter (died 1759)
  - Zou Yigui, Chinese Qing dynasty painter (died 1772)
  - Zhang Zongcang, Chinese Qing dynasty painter (died 1756)
- probable – Li Shan, Chinese painter (died 1756)

== Deaths ==
- January 2 – Frederik de Moucheron, Dutch Golden Age landscape painter (born 1633)
- January 17 – Carlo Dolci, Italian painter of chiefly sacred subjects (born 1616)
- February 5 – Matthias Rauchmiller, German sculptor active in Vienna (born 1645)
- May – Jacques d'Arthois, Flemish Baroque painter specializing in landscapes (born 1613)
- June 25 – Simon Ushakov, Russian painter (born 1626)
- July 11 – Michel Anguier, French sculptor (born 1612)
- date unknown
  - Antonio Busca, Italian painter active in Lombardy (born 1625)
  - Carlo Cesio, Italian painter active in Rome (born 1626)
  - Nicolas Cochin, French draughtsman and engraver (born 1610)
  - Giovanni Battista Marmi, Italian painter (born 1659)
  - Pieter Pietersz Nedek, Dutch Golden Age painter (born 1616)
  - Antonio Raggi, Italian sculptor (born 1624)
  - Dirk Stoop, Dutch Golden Age painter (born 1615)
