= Grande Commande =

Series of statues commissioned by Louis XIV

Coordinates: 48.8049°N 2.1204°E

The grande commande was a commission ordered by Louis XIV for statues intended to decorate the parterre d’eau of the gardens of the Palace of Versailles, as initially conceived in 1672. The commission, which included 24 statues and four groups, was ordered in 1674. Designed by Charles Le Brun from Cesare Ripa’s Iconologia, the statues were executed by the foremost sculptors of the day (Blunt, 1980; Friedman, 1988, 1993; Nolhac, 1913; Thompson, 2006; Verlet, 1985).

Owing to concerns of the effects of the vertical lines of the statues in relations to the garden façade of the château, the statues of the grande commande were transferred to other locations in the gardens in 1684 (Berger, 1985; Blunt, 1980; Friedman, 1988, 1993; Marie, 1968; Nolhac, 1901, 1913; Thompson, 2006; Verlet, 1985; Weber, 1993).

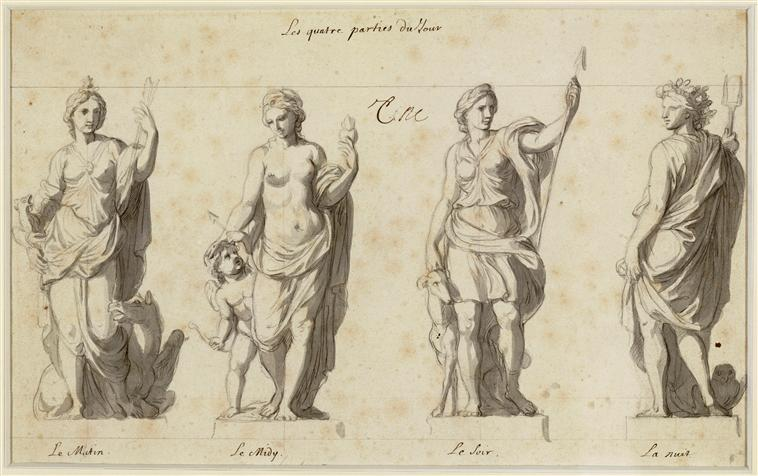
Charles Le Brun, The Four Parts of the Day

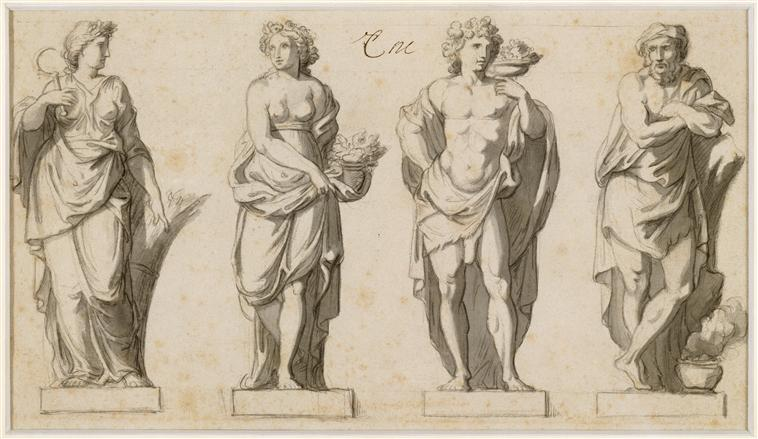
Le Brun, The Four Seasons

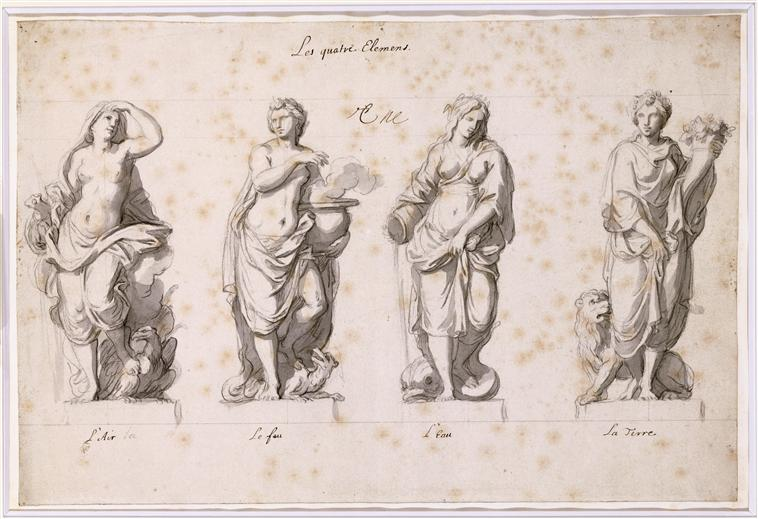
Le Brun, The Four Elements

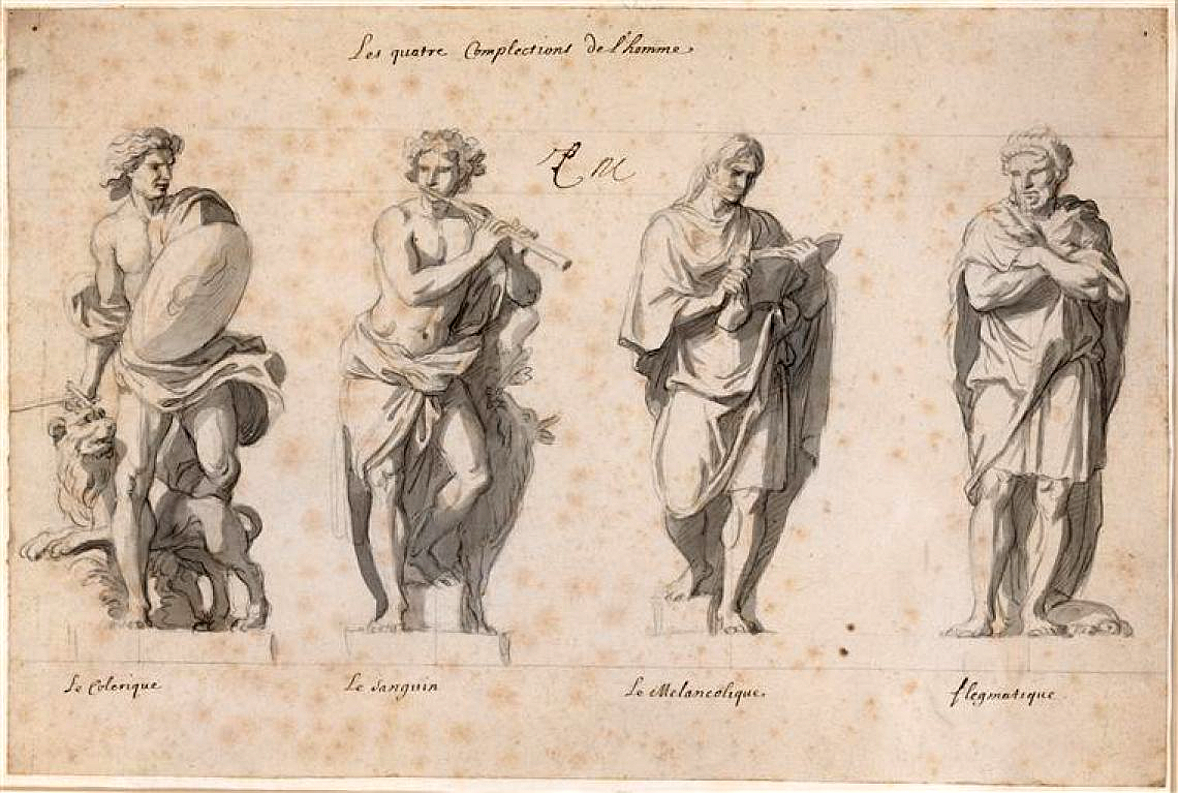
Le Brun, 'The Four Humors of Man

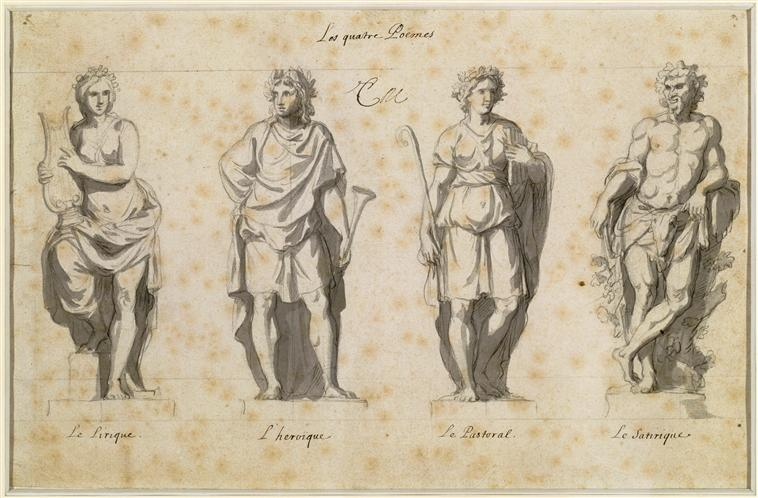
Le Brun, 'The Four Forms of Poetry

The 24 statues were personifications of the classic quaternities:

- The Four Humors of Man

- Melancholic
- Phlegmatic
- Choleric
- Sanguine

- The Four Parts of the Day

- Dawn
- Noon
- Evening
- Night

- The Four Parts of the World

- Europe
- Africa
- Asia
- America

- The Four Forms of Poetry

- Lyric
- Pastoral
- Satirical
- Epic

- The Four Seasons

- Spring
- Summer
- Autumn
- Winter

- The Four Elements

- Fire
- Air
- Earth
- Water

The four groupings represented the four classic Abductions:

- The Four Abductions:

- Persephone by Pluto
- Cybele by Saturn
- Orethyia by Boreas
- Coronis by Neptune

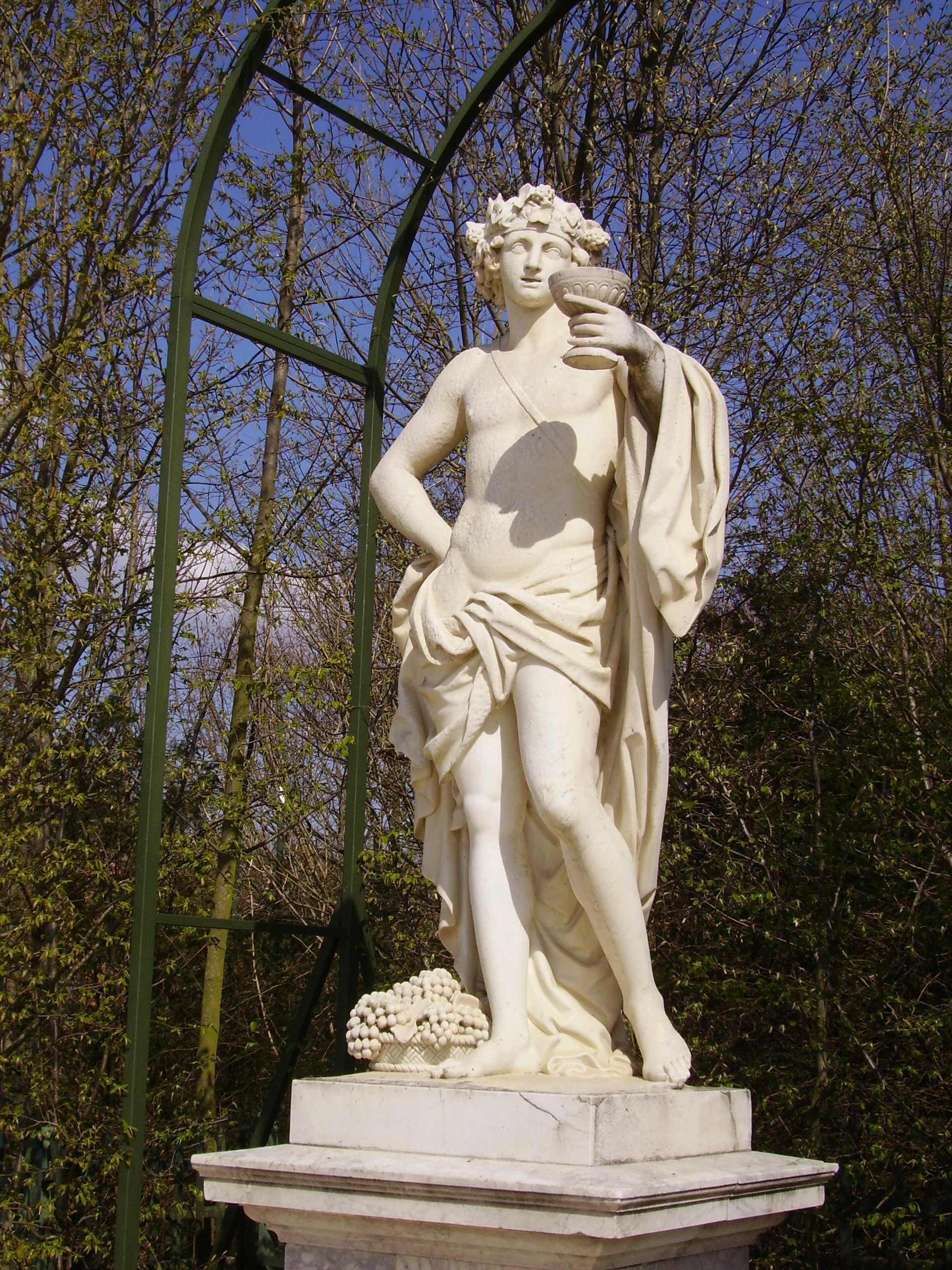
Thomas Regnaudin, L'Automne sous les traits de Bacchus (the autumn represented as Bacchus), copy, cast, Versailles' gardens.

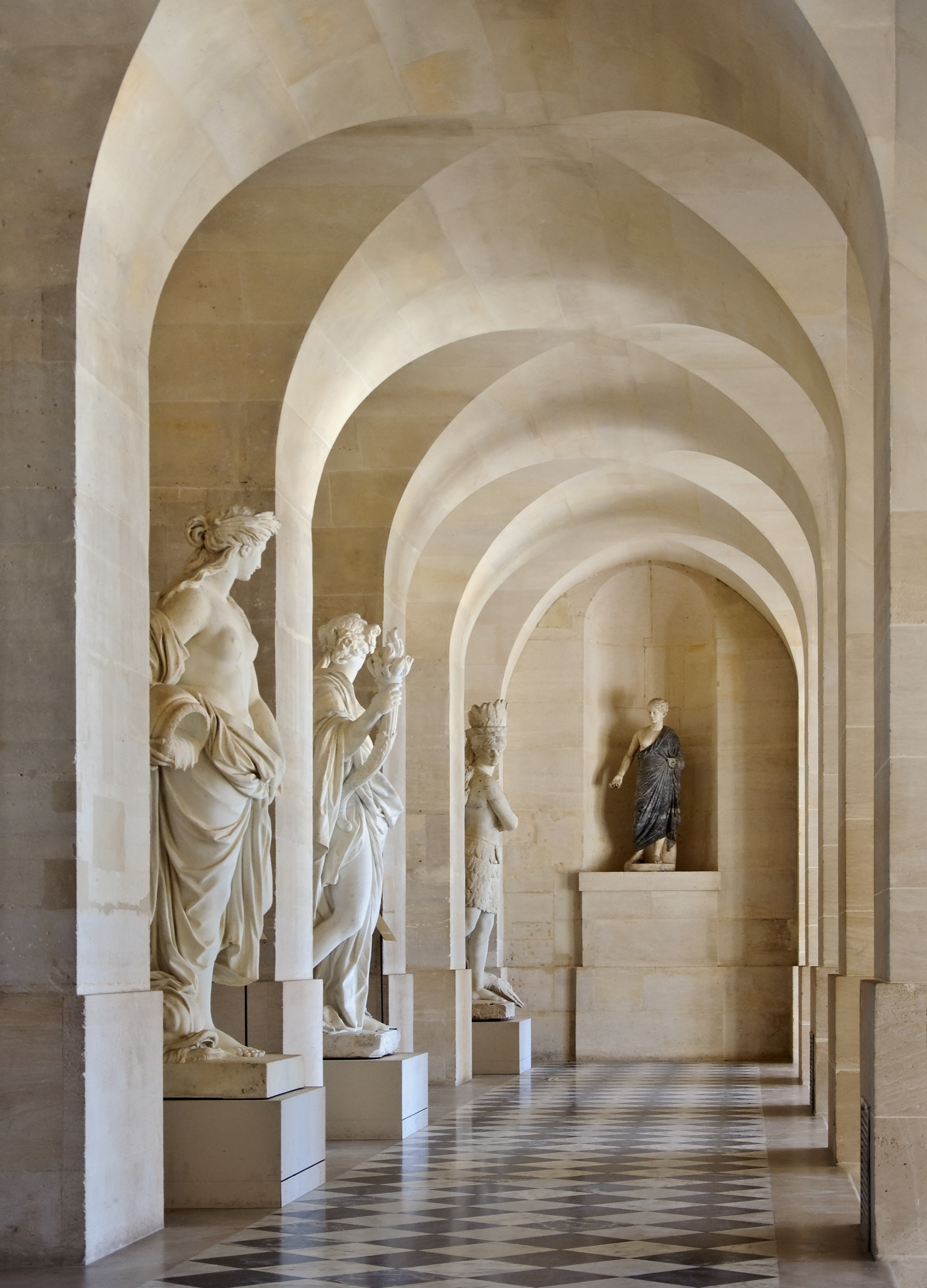
The original statues Water, Night, America, preserved in the galerie basse of the Palace of Versailles.

Statues of the grande commande - The Four Humors of Man
“Meoncholy” by Michel de la Perdrix, (? - 1693)	“Phlegmatic” by Matthieu Lespagnandelle, (1617–1689)	“Choloric” by Jacques Houzeau, (1624–1691)	“Sanguine” by Noël V Jouvenet, (?-1716)

Statues of the grande commande - The Four Parts of the Day
“Dawn” by Pierre I Legros, (1629–1714)	“Noon” by Gaspard Marsy, (1624–1681)	“Evening” by Martin Desjardins, (1637–1694)	“Night” by Jean Raon, (1631–1707)

Statues of the grande commande – The Four Parts of the World
“Europe” by Pierre Mazeline, (1632–1708)	“Africa” by Jean Cornu, (1650–1710)	“Asia” by Léonard Roger, (1644-après 1694)	“America” by Gilles Guérin, (1611/1612-1678)

Statues of the grande commande - The Four Forms of Poetry
“Lyric Poetry” by Jean-Baptiste Tuby, (1635–1700)	“Pastoral Poetry” by Pierre Granier, (1655–1715)	“Satyrical Poetry” by Philippe de Buyster, (1595–1688)	“Epic Poetry” by Jean Drouilly, (1641–1698)

Statues of the grande commande - The Four Seasons
“Spring” by Laurent Magnier, (1618–1700)	“Summer” by Pierre Hutinot, (1616–1679)	“Autumn” by Thomas Regnaudin, (1622–1706)	“Winter” by François Girardon, (1628–1715)

Statues of the grande commande - The Four Elements
“Fire” by Nicolas Dossier, (1629–1700)	“Air” by Etienne Le Hongre, (1628–1690)	“Earth” by Benoît Massou, (1627–1684)	“Water” by Pierre I Legros, (1629–1714)

Statues of the grande commande – The Abductions
“Boreas abducting Orethyia” by Anselme I Flamen, (1647–1717)	“Saturn abducting Cybele” by Thomas Regnaudin, (1622–1706)	“Pluto abducting Persephone” by François Girardon, (1628–1715)

== Sources ==
Books

- Berger, Robert W. (1985). In the Garden of the Sun King: Studies on the Park of Versailles Under Louis XIV. Washington, DC: Dumbarton Oaks Research Library. ISBN 0-88402-141-6.
- Berger, Robert W. (1986). Versailles: The Chateau of Louis XIV. University Park: The College Arts Association. ISBN 0-271-00412-6.
- Blunt, Anthony (1980). Art and Architecture in France 1500 to 1700. Harmondsworth, Middlesex, England: Penguin Books. ISBN 0-300-07735-1.
- Marie, Alfred (1968). Naissance de Versailles. Paris: Edition Vincent, Freal & Cie.
- Marie, Alfred and Jeanne (1976). Versailles au temps de Louis XIV. Paris: Imprimerie Nationale.
- Nolhac, Pierre de (1901). La création de Versailles. Versailles: L. Bernard.
- Nolhac, Pierre de (1911–1918). Histoire de Versailles. Vol. 3 v. Paris: André Marty.
- * Nolhac, Pierre de (1913). Les jardins de Versailles. Paris: Manzi, Joyant et Cie.
- * Nolhac, Pierre de (1925). Versailles, résidence de Louis XIV. Paris: Louis Conard.
- * Nolhac, Pierre de (1929). Versailles. Paris: A. Morancé.
- * Nolhac, Pierre de (1930). Versailles et la cour de France: L'Art à Versailles. Paris: Louis Conard.
- * Nolhac, Pierre de (1937). La Résurrection de Versailles, souvenirs d'un conservateur, 1887-1920. Paris: Plon.
- * Ripa, Cesare (1593–1603). Iconologia ovvero discrittione dell'imagini universli cavate dall'antichita e da altri luoghi. Roma.
- * Thompson, Ian (2006). The Sun King's Garden: Louis XIV, André Le Nôtre, and the Creation of the Gardens of Versailles. London: Bloomsbury Publishing.
- * Verlet, Pierre (1985). Le château de Versailles. Paris: Librairie Arthème Fayard.

Journals

- * Bottineau, Yves (October 1988). "Essais sur le Versailles de Louis XIV II: le style et l'iconographie". Gazette des Beaux-Arts. 6 per., vol. 112: 119–132.
- * Friedman, Ann (January–March 1988). "The evolution of the Parterre d'eau". Journal of Garden History. 8 (1): 1–30.
- * Friedman, Ann (May 1993). "Charles Le Brun as Landscape Architect: His Designs for the First Parterre d'eau at Versailles". Eighteenth Century Life. 17, n.s., 2: 24–35.
- * Girardet, Raoul (1951). "Autour de Le Brun: Les artistes de Versailles". Médecine de France. 28: 17–28.
- * Himelfarb, Hélène. "Versailles, fonctions et legendes". Les Lieux de Mémoire: La Nation II: 235–292.
- * Hoog, Simone (April–May 1985). "Sur la restauration de quelques sculptures du parc du Versailles". Monuments historiques de la France. 138: 50–56.
- * Josephson, Ragnar (1926). "Relation de la visite de Nicodème Tessin à Marly, Versailles, Rueil, et St-Cloud en 1687". Revue de l'Histoire de Versailles: 150–67, 274–300.
- * Le Guillou, Jean-Claude (December 1983). "Le château-neuf ou enveloppe de Versailles: concept et evolution du premier projet". Gazette des Beaux-Arts. 6 pér., vol. 102: 193–207.
- * Le Guillou, Jean-Claude (February 1976). "Remarques sur le corps central du château de Versailles". Gazette des Beaux-Arts. 6 pér., vol. 87: 49–60.
- * Nolhac, Pierre de (1899). "La construction de Versailles de LeVau". Revue de l'Histoire de Versailles: 161–171.
- * Souchal, François (February 1972). "Les statues aux façades du château de Versailles". Gazette des Beaux-Arts. 6 pér., vol. 79: 65–110.
- * Tadgell, Christopher (1985). "Versailles: le grand projet". Colloque de Versailles.
- * Weber, Gerold (1981). "Charles LeBrun: Recueil des divers dessins de fontaines". Münchner Jahrbuch der bildenden Kunst: 151–181.
- * Weber, Gerold (May 1993). "Réflexions sur la genèse du jardin français classique et de son décor". Eighteenth Century Life. 17, n.s., 2: 1–23.
- * Wiebenson, Dora (1985). "Commentaires anglais du XVIIe siècle sur le parc de Versailles". Colloque de Versailles.
