= 1683 in art =

Events from the year 1683 in art.

== Events ==
- Last known dated work painted by David Teniers the Younger.

== Paintings ==
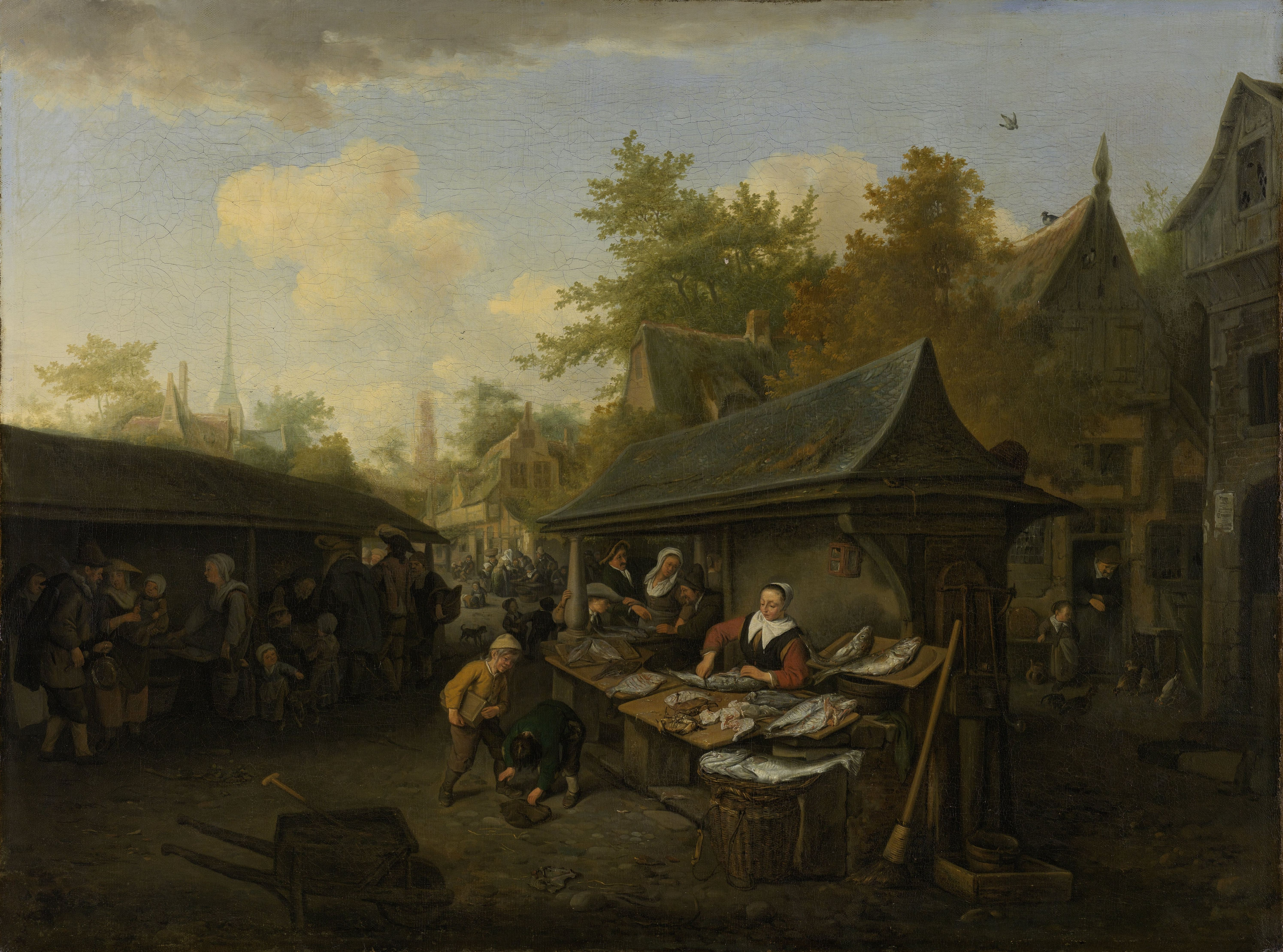
Dusart - Fish Market

- Cornelis Dusart - Fish Market
- René-Antoine Houasse - La Magnificence du Roi (ceiling painting in Salon de l’Abondance, Palace of Versailles)
- John Riley - Portrait of John Dryden

== Births ==
- December 4 - Shem Drowne, American coppersmith and tinplate worker (died 1774)
- date unknown
  - Pietro Giovanni Abbati, Italian set designer, painter and engraver (died 1745)
  - Gao Fenghan, Chinese painter (died 1749)
  - Miyagawa Chōshun, Japanese painter in the ukiyo-e style (died 1753)
  - Ciro Adolfi, Italian painter (died 1758)
  - Domenico Brandi, Italian painter primarily of still lifes of birds and animals, as well as pastoral landscapes (vedute) (died 1736)
  - Bernardo de' Dominici, Italian art historian and painter (died 1759)
  - Giorgio Duranti, Italian painter of still lifes (died 1768)
  - Johan Georg Geitel, Finnish painter (died 1771)
  - Francesco Monti, Italian fresco painter (died 1768)
  - Francesco Polazzo, Italian painter of portraits and historical subjects (died 1753)
  - Anna Maria Thelott, Swedish engraver, illustrator, woodcut-artist, and miniaturist (died 1710)
  - 1683-1685: Christian Friedrich Zincke, German miniature painter (died 1767)

== Deaths ==
- February 18 - Nicolaes Pieterszoon Berchem, Dutch painter of pastoral landscapes (born 1620)
- March 11 - Giovanni Bernardo Carboni, Italian historical and portrait painter (born 1614)
- June 12 - Tobias Pock, Austrian painter (born 1609)
- June 7 - Giovanni Ghisolfi, Italian painter of vedute and capricci, mainly landscapes (born 1623)
- ?October - Philips Angel, Dutch painter (born 1616)
- date unknown - Daniel Schultz, Dutch painter (born 1615)
  - Guillaume Chasteau, French engraver (born 1635)
  - Daniel Schultz, Polish-Lithuanian painter (born 1615)
  - Willem van Aelst, Dutch artist (born 1627)
- probable
  - Cornelis Norbertus Gysbrechts, Flemish painter of still life and trompe-l'œil (born 1630)
  - Jan van Almeloveen, Dutch painter, engraver, and draughtsman (born 1652)
