= 1745 in art =

Events from the year 1745 in art.

== Events ==
- Hieronimo Miani completes the decoration of Christiansborg Palace in Copenhagen.

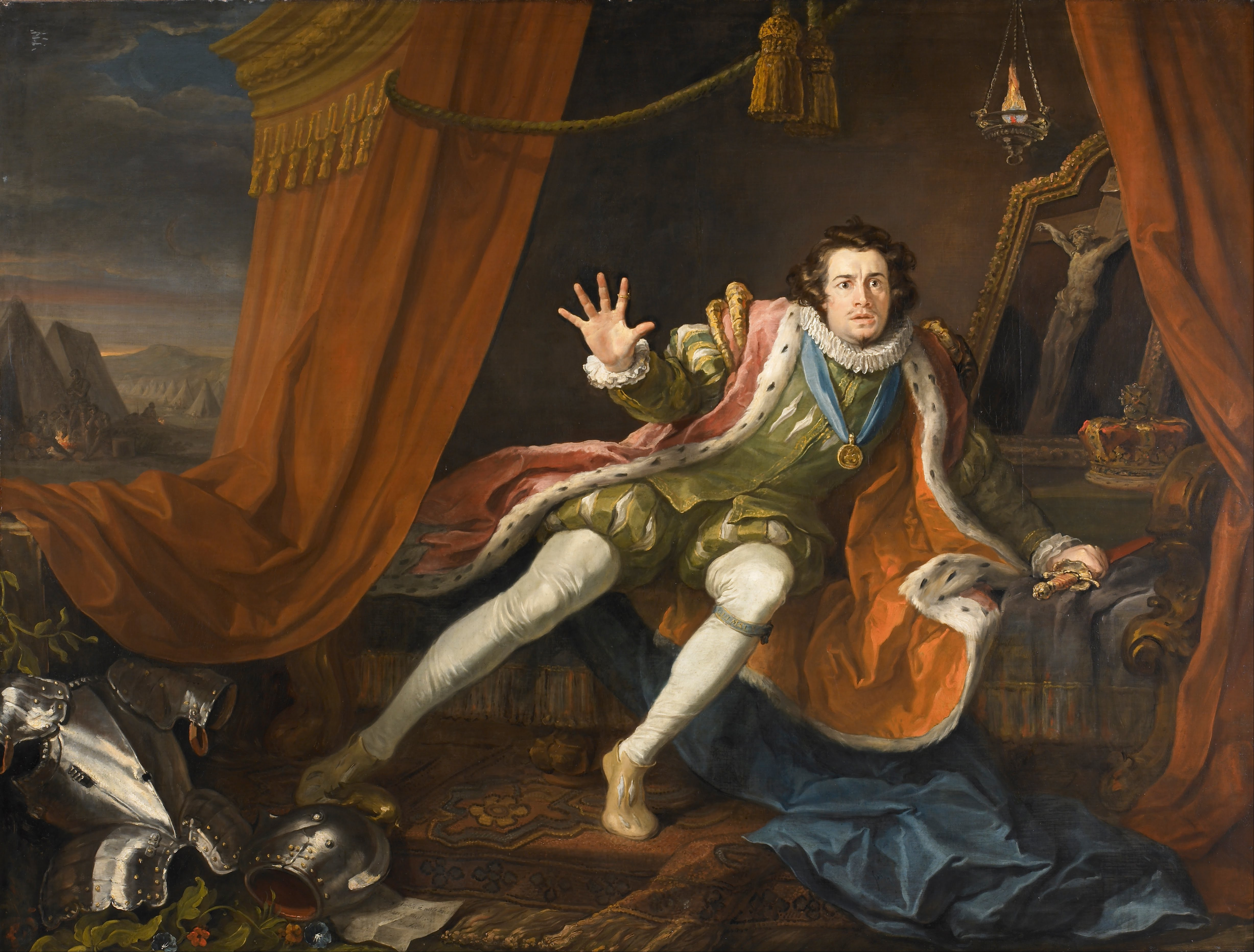
Hogarth – David Garrick as Richard III

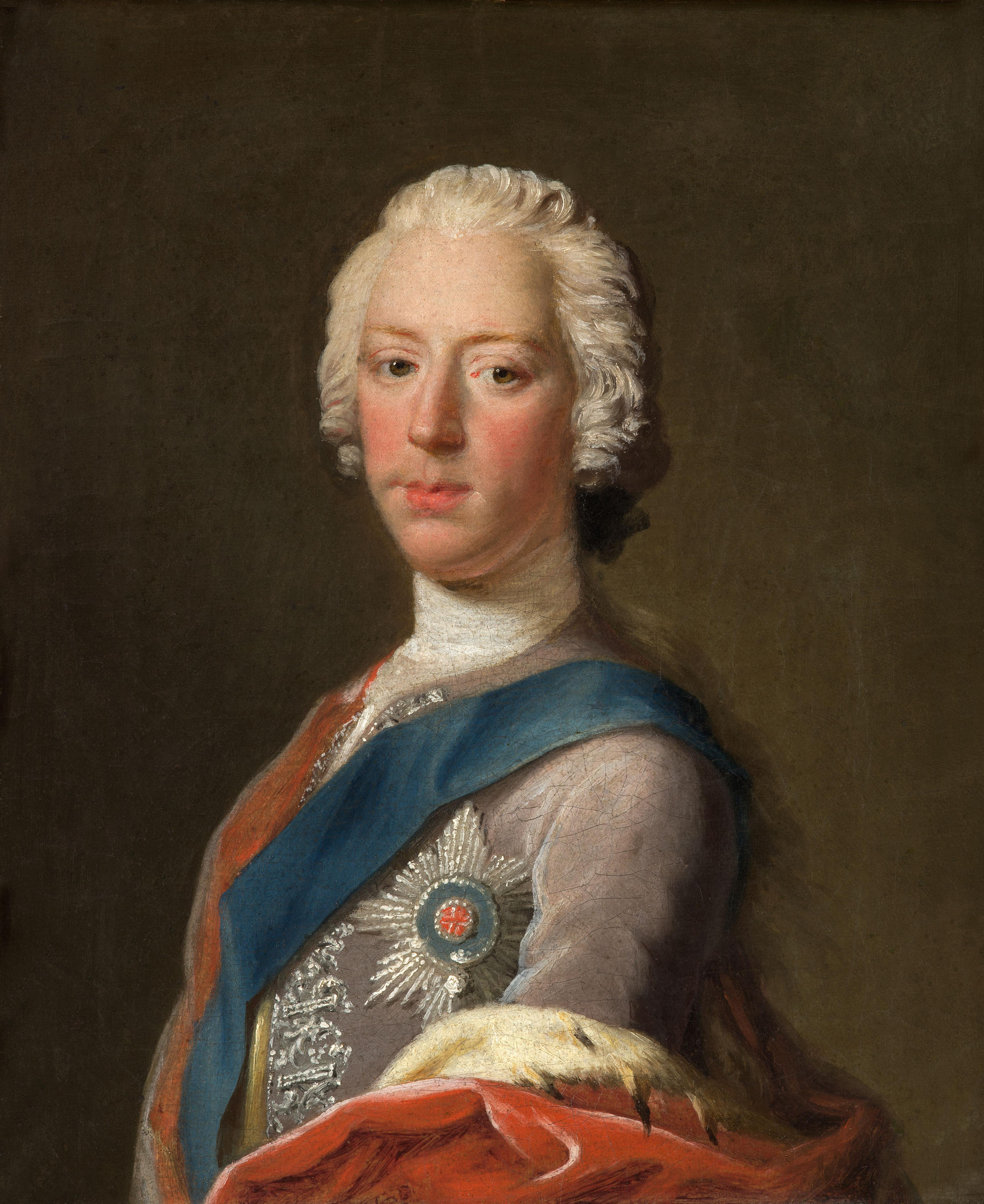
Ramsay – The lost portrait of Charles Edward Stuart

== Works ==
- Andien de Clermont – Monkey Room ceiling, Kirtlington Park, Oxfordshire, England
- William Hogarth
  - Captain Lord George Graham in his Cabin
  - David Garrick as Richard III
- Allan Ramsay – Lost portrait of Charles Edward Stuart
- Richard Wilson – The Cock Tavern at Cheam

== Births ==
- February 2 – John Nichols (printer), English printer and author (died 1826)
- March 5 – Christina Elisabeth Carowsky, Swedish portrait painter (died 1797)
- March 29 – John Russell, English portrait painter (died 1806)
- May 5 – Carl August Ehrensvärd, Swedish naval officer, painter, author and neo-classical architect (died 1800)
- May 12 – Jens Juel, Danish portrait painter (died 1802)
- June 16 – Sigmund Freudenberger, Swiss painter (died 1801)
- June 26 – Nils Schillmark, Swedish-born painter who lived and worked in Finland (died 1804)
- July 6 – Jean-Joseph Taillasson, French painter (died 1809)
- August 3 – Domenico Pozzi, Swiss painter (died 1796)
- October 6 – Franciszek Smuglewicz, Polish draughtsman and painter (died 1807)
- date unknown
  - Luigi Acquisti, Italian sculptor mainly known for his works in the neoclassical style (died 1823)
  - Pyotr Drozhdin, Russian painter] (died 1805)
  - Anne Forbes, Scottish portrait painter (died 1834)
  - Gim Hongdo, Korean painter of the late Joseon period (died 1806)
  - Anton Hickel, Czech painter (died 1798)
  - Yi In-mun, Korean court painter of the late Joseon Dynasty, primarily of landscapes (died 1821)
  - Francis Jukes, English etcher, engraver and publisher (died 1812)
  - Pierre Lacour, French painter (died 1814)
  - Wincenty de Lesseur, Polish portrait painter (died 1813)
  - Uragami Gyokudo, Japanese musician, painter, poet and calligrapher (died 1820)
  - 1745/1749: Gottlieb Welté, German etcher and landscape painter (died 1792)

== Deaths ==
- February 23 – Joseph Effner, German architect and interior decorator (born 1687)
- May 28 – Jonathan Richardson, English portrait painter, writer on art and collector (born 1667)
- June 13 – Domenico Antonio Vaccaro, Italian painter, sculptor and architect (born 1678)
- June 28 – Giovanni Maria delle Piane, court painter (born 1660)
- September 14 – Martino Altomonte, Italian fresco painter (born 1657)
- December 19 – Jean-Baptiste van Loo, Dutch painter (born 1684)
- date unknown
  - Pietro Giovanni Abbati, Italian set designer, painter and engraver (born 1683)
  - Claude Du Bosc, French engraver (born 1682)
  - Mehmet Emin Tokadi, Ottoman Sufi saint, writer, calligrapher, and scholar (born 1664)
  - Willem Van der Hagen, Dutch painter who settled in Ireland, founder of the Irish school of landscape painting (born unknown)
- probable – Johan Richter, painter of landscapes or vedute of Venice (born 1665)
