= Portrait of Lord Liverpool =

Painting by Thomas Lawrence

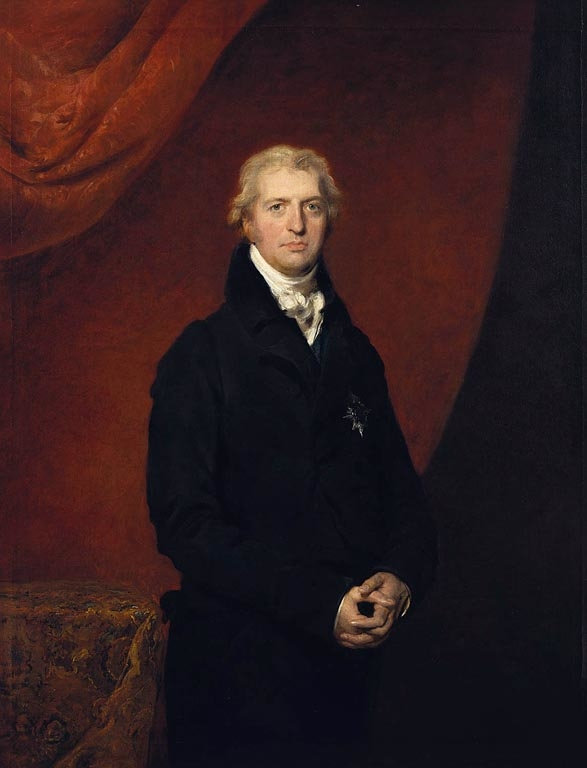
- Artist: Thomas Lawrence
- Year: c. 1820
- Type: Oil on canvas, portrait
- Dimensions: 140.1 cm × 108.6 cm (55.2 in × 42.8 in)
- Location: Royal Collection, Windsor Castle

Portrait of Lord Liverpool is an oil on canvas portrait by the English artist Thomas Lawrence, depicting the British politician and Prime Minister Lord Liverpool, from c. 1820.

== History and description ==
Liverpool had become Prime Minister in 1812 while Lawrence was Britain's leading society portraitist who painted the politician on a number of occasions including the 1796 portrait of Liverpool. It was commissioned by George IV, then Prince Regent, for a sum of £300 guineas and was included in the inventory of Carlton House in 1819, although it remained in the artist's studio at his death in 1830. He is shown wearing the Order of the Garter on an otherwise dark, plain coat. It was transferred to the Waterloo Chamber at Windsor Castle afterwards, which had been under construction by Jeffry Wyatville.

Over a number of years George commissioned Lawrence to paint leading European figures involved in the defeat of Napoleon's French Empire in 1814–1815. Among the twenty eight paintings Liverpool and his colleague Lord Castlereagh, the Foreign Secretary, represented the British political leadership along with the military commander the Duke of Wellington. It features in Joseph Nash's 1844 watercolour of the Waterloo Chamber.

== Bibliography ==
- Gash, Norman. Lord Liverpool: The Life and Political Career of Robert Banks Jenkinson, Second Earl of Liverpool, 1770–1828. Harvard University Press, 1984.
- Hay, William Anthony. Lord Liverpool: A Political Life. Boydell Press, 2018.
- Hutchinson, Martin. Britain's Greatest Prime Minister. Lutterworth Press, 2020
- Levey, Michael. Sir Thomas Lawrence. Yale University Press, 2005.

== See also ==
- Portrait of George Canning, an 1826 work by Lawrence depicting Liverpool's successor as Prime Minister
