= Gilles Guérin =

French sculptor

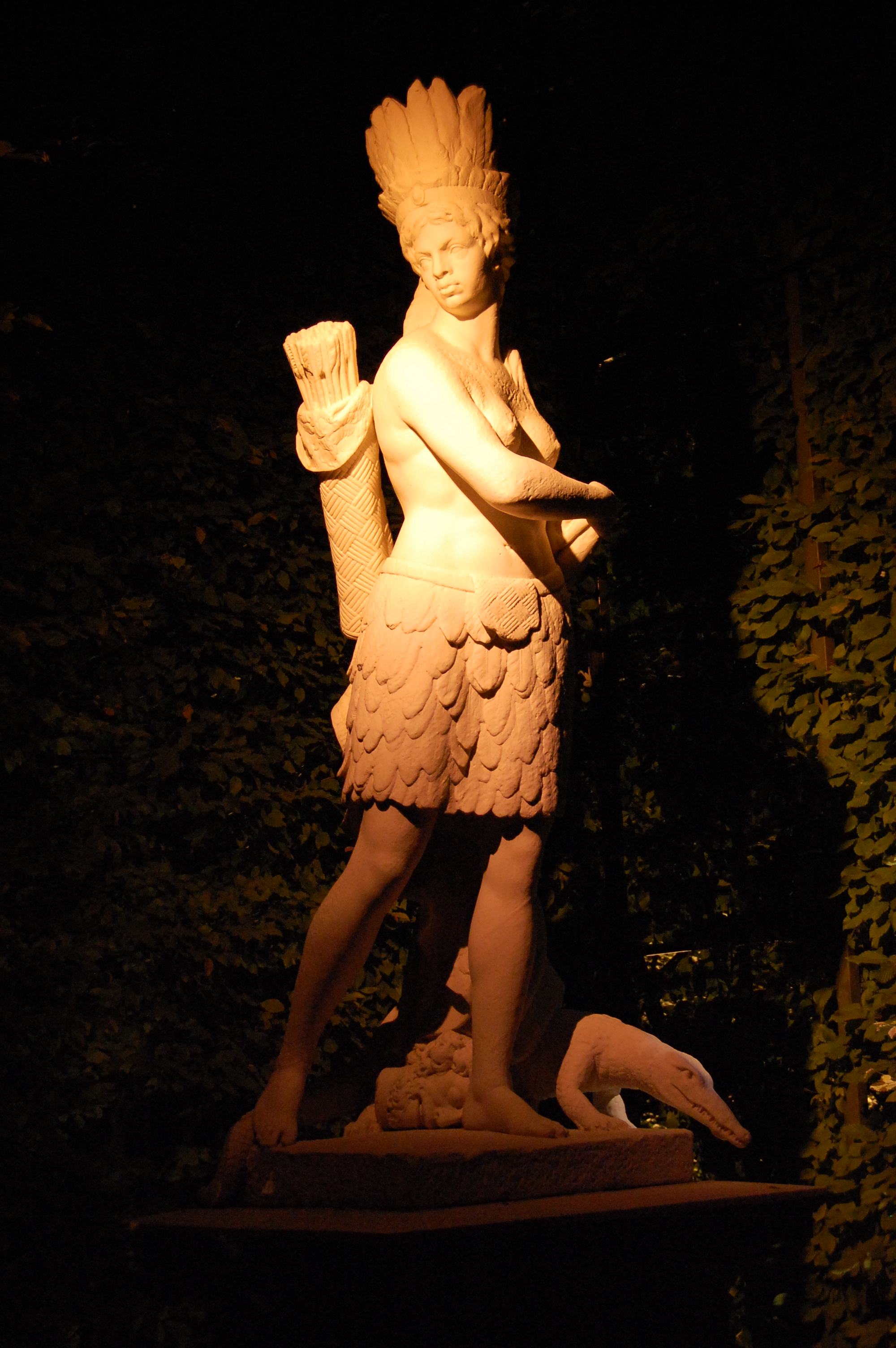
America

Gilles Guérin (French pronunciation: [ʒil ɡeʁɛ̃]; 1611–1678) was a French sculptor, who created tomb sculptures and decorative sculptures for interiors, which were executed in a Baroque idiom. He was born and died in Paris. He was a pupil of the sculptor Nicolas Le Brun, the father of the painter Charles Le Brun.

== Notable works ==
- Chimney pieces and the bas-reliefs of the Four Elements in the Vestibule at the Château de Maisons.
- Decorative sculpture at the Château de Guermantes.
- Ceiling and bed alcove sculpture, to designs of Louis Le Vau for the bedroom for Louis XIV in the Pavillon du Roi of the Louvre Palace. Reerected in the gallery housing Egyptian New Kingdom works of art.
- Reclining figure (gisant) of Henry II de Bourbon, prince de Condé, the father of the Grand Condé, for his tomb in the church of Vallery (Yonne), 1646–51. A one-third scale terracotta model for the finished marble, pointed preparatory to being scaled up, is conserved in the Musée du Louvre.
- Kneeling figures for the tomb of the duc Charles de La Vieuville (died 1653) and Marie Bouhier (died 1663). Contract dated 1658; dismantled at the Revolution; preserved in the Musée du Louvre

Louis XIV Crushes the Fronde

- Louis XIV Crushes the Fronde, commissioned 27 March 1653 by the aldermen of the city of Paris and erected 23 June 1654, in the courtyard of the Hôtel de Ville. The original passed into the hands of the Bourbon-Condé family and is preserved at the Château de Chantilly. A terracotta model is conserved in the Musée du Louvre.
- Triton grooming horse of Apollo, to an idea by Claude Perrault designed by Charles Le Brun, in the Grotto of Thetis, Versailles, 1665. (noted in Hedin 2001)
- Palais du Louvre, Cour Carrée. Roof caryatids, after designs of Jacques Sarrazin.
- L'Amérique, terminated by Henri Emericq, one of the statues of the "quatre parties du monde" of the Grande Commande, for the Gardens of Versailles.
