= Portrait of Lord Hawkesbury =

1796 painting by Thomas Lawrence

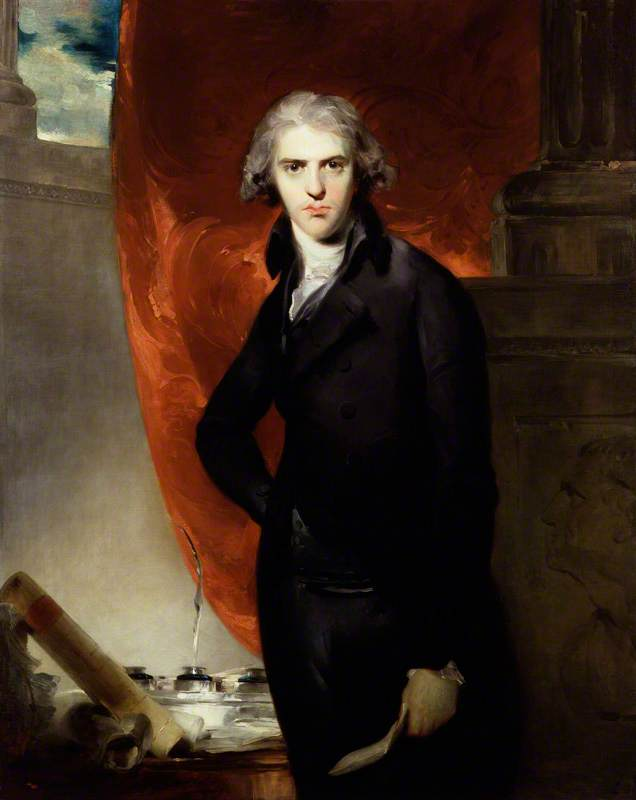
- Artist: Thomas Lawrence
- Year: 1796
- Type: Oil on canvas, portrait
- Dimensions: 127 cm × 101.6 cm (50 in × 40.0 in)
- Location: National Portrait Gallery, London

The Portrait of Lord Hawkesbury is an oil-on-canvas painting by the English artist Thomas Lawrence depicting the British politician and future prime minister Lord Hawkesbury, then in his mid-twenties. It is also known as the Portrait of Lord Liverpool, referring to the title he inherited in 1808 and by which he is better known. It was created in 1796.

== History and description ==
Lawrence had established himself as a leading portrait painter and depicted many politicians and royal figures of Liverpool's generation. The work was painted around 1796. It features a Bas-Relief of Demosthenes, the celebrated Athenian orator and hero of the subject. Liverpool's determined, combative stance may be an attempt to echo the Ancient Greek statesman. Liverpool's biographer Norman Gash describes it as showing "a sensitive and intense young man with long hair, worn naturally in a kind of studied disorder, and a curiously intent look beneath the dark level eyebrows". An engraving of the portrait was made in 1801 around the time that he was negotiating the Treaty of Amiens with France.

After serving as foreign secretary, home secretary and war secretary, Liverpool succeeded the assassinated Spencer Perceval in 1812, overseeing victory in the Napoleonic Wars and becoming Britain's third-longest-serving prime minister. Lawrence painted him several more times, including in 1820 and then in 1826 towards the end of his lengthy period as premier.

It has been part of the collection of the National Portrait Gallery in London since 1994 and is now on display there.

== See also ==
- Portrait of Lord Liverpool, 1820 depiction of Liverpool as prime minister now in the Waterloo Chamber

== Bibliography ==
- Gash, Norman. Lord Liverpool: The Life and Political Career of Robert Banks Jenkinson, Second Earl of Liverpool, 1770–1828. Harvard University Press, 1984.
- Hay, William Anthony. Lord Liverpool: A Political Life. Boydell Press, 2018.
- Hutchinson, Martin. Britain's Greatest Prime Minister. Lutterworth Press, 2020.
- Holmes, Richard. Thomas Lawrence Portraits. National Portrait Gallery, 2010.
- Levey, Michael. Sir Thomas Lawrence. Yale University Press, 2005.
