= Thomas Regnaudin =

French sculptor (1622–1706)

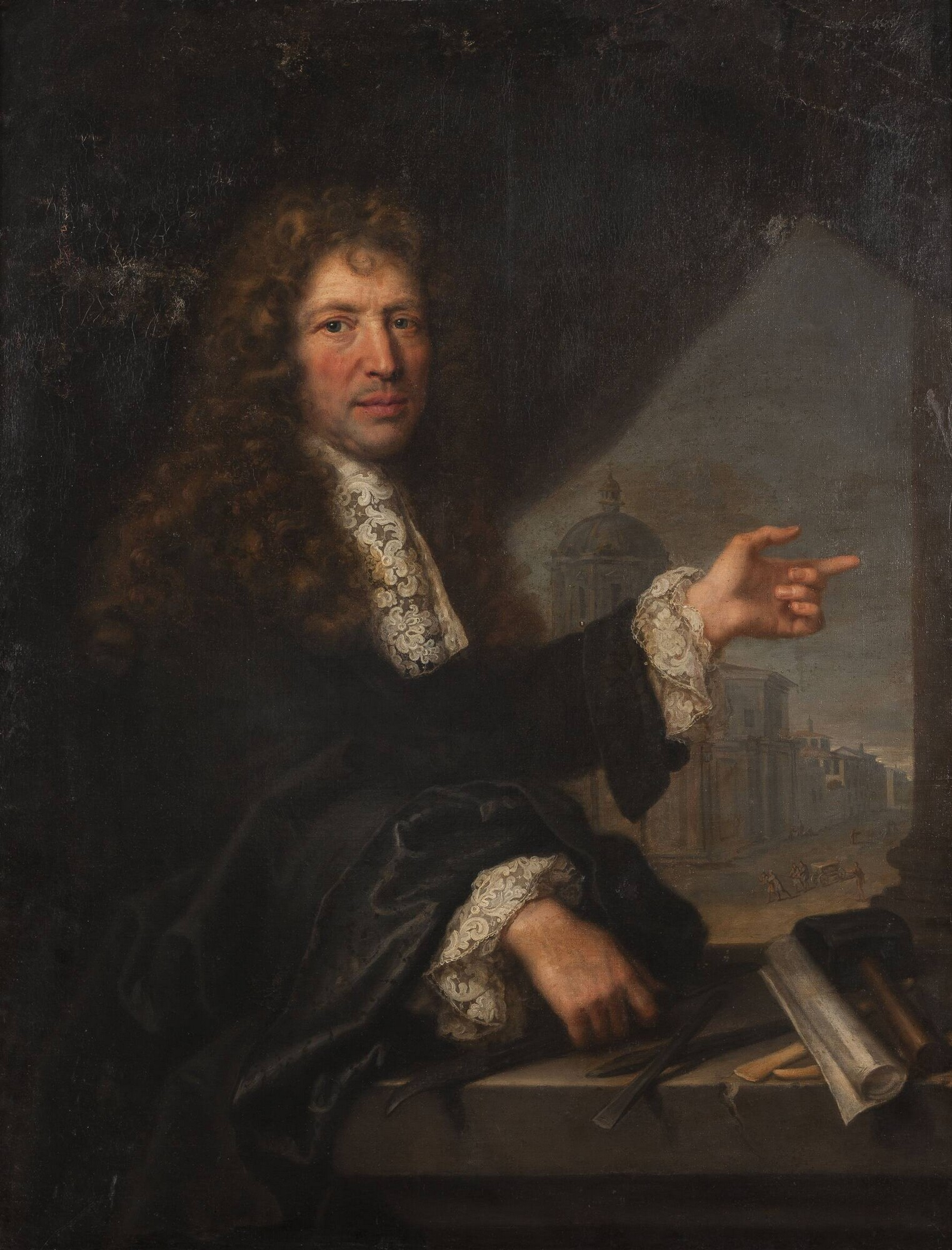
- Portrait by Louis Ferdinand Elle the Younger, 1681
- Baptised: 18 February 1622
- Died: 3 July 1706
- Occupation: Sculptor
- Movement: Northern Baroque

Thomas Regnaudin (baptised 18 February 1622 – 3 July 1706) was a French sculptor, affiliated with Northern Baroque. Some of Regnaudin's works were placed in the Apollo Gallery of the Louvre. A son of a stonemason, he was a pupil of Anguier.

== Works ==
- Henri II de Montmorency Monument in Moulins, created with François Anguier.
- Three Nymphs, for the Grotto of Thetys, Gardens of Versailles.
- Apollo Served by the Nymphs, executed under the direction of François Girardon.
- Decoration of the Four Seasons fountains: Summer (after a design by Charles Le Brun), works for the Four Abductions series including Saturn Abducting Cybele, and sculptures representing the Loire and the Loiret for the Water Parterre at the Palace of Versailles.
- Carved wooden gateway for the hôtel particulier of Jean-Baptiste Amelot de Bisseuil (1612–1688), on Rue Vieille-du-Temple, Paris, including the panel Head of Medusa. This gateway appears on the cover of the album All This Useless Beauty by musician Elvis Costello.
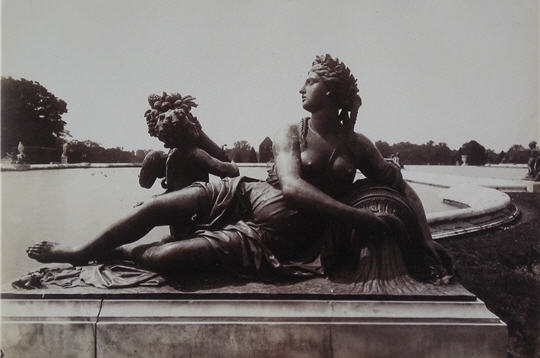
The Loiret, eastern coping of the South Basin in the Water Parterre at the Palace of Versailles. Photograph by Eugène Atget (1902).

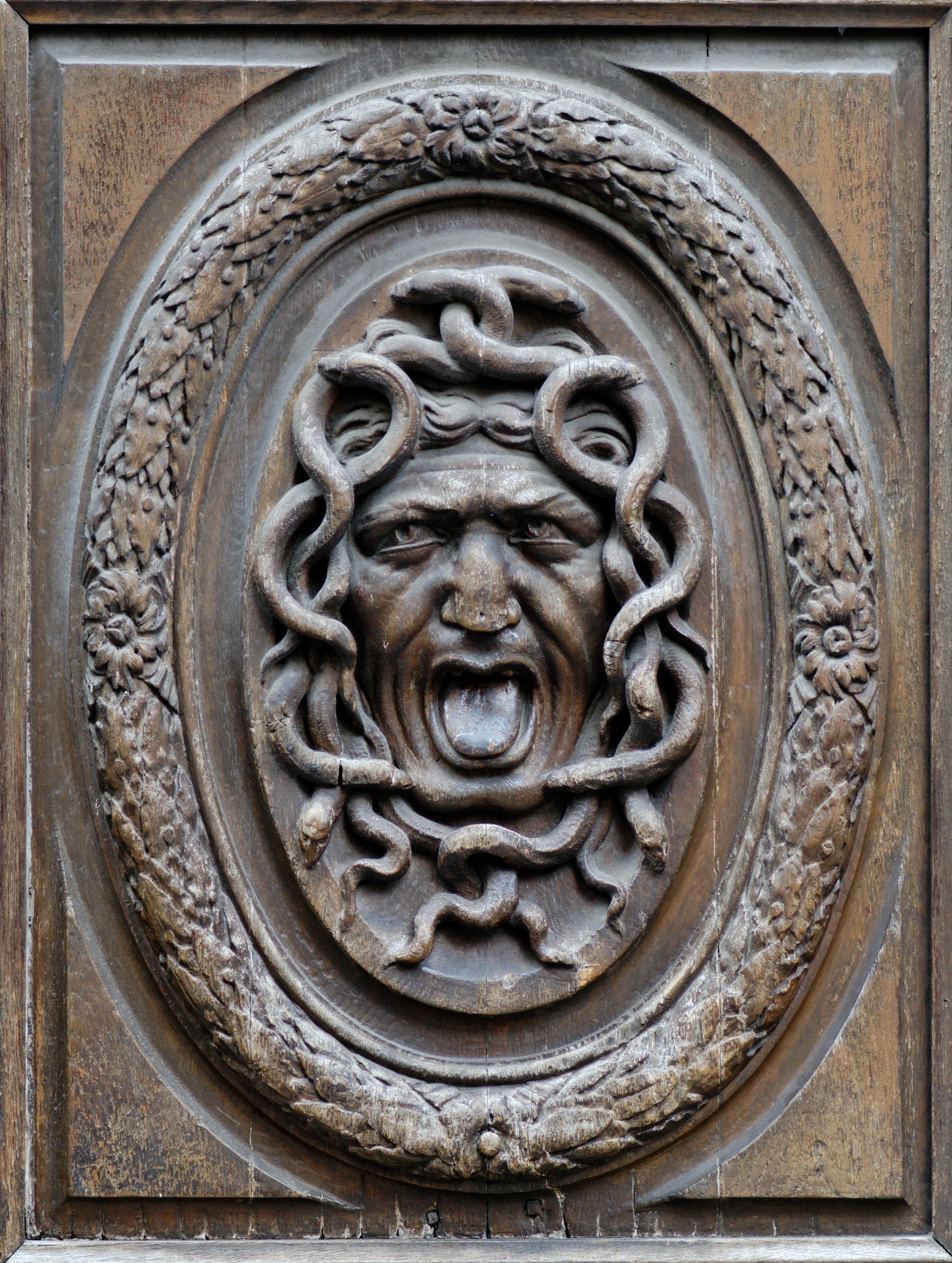
Medusa, decoration on a panel of the gateway of the Hôtel Amelot de Bisseuil, Paris.
