= Johan Philip Korn =

Swedish painter

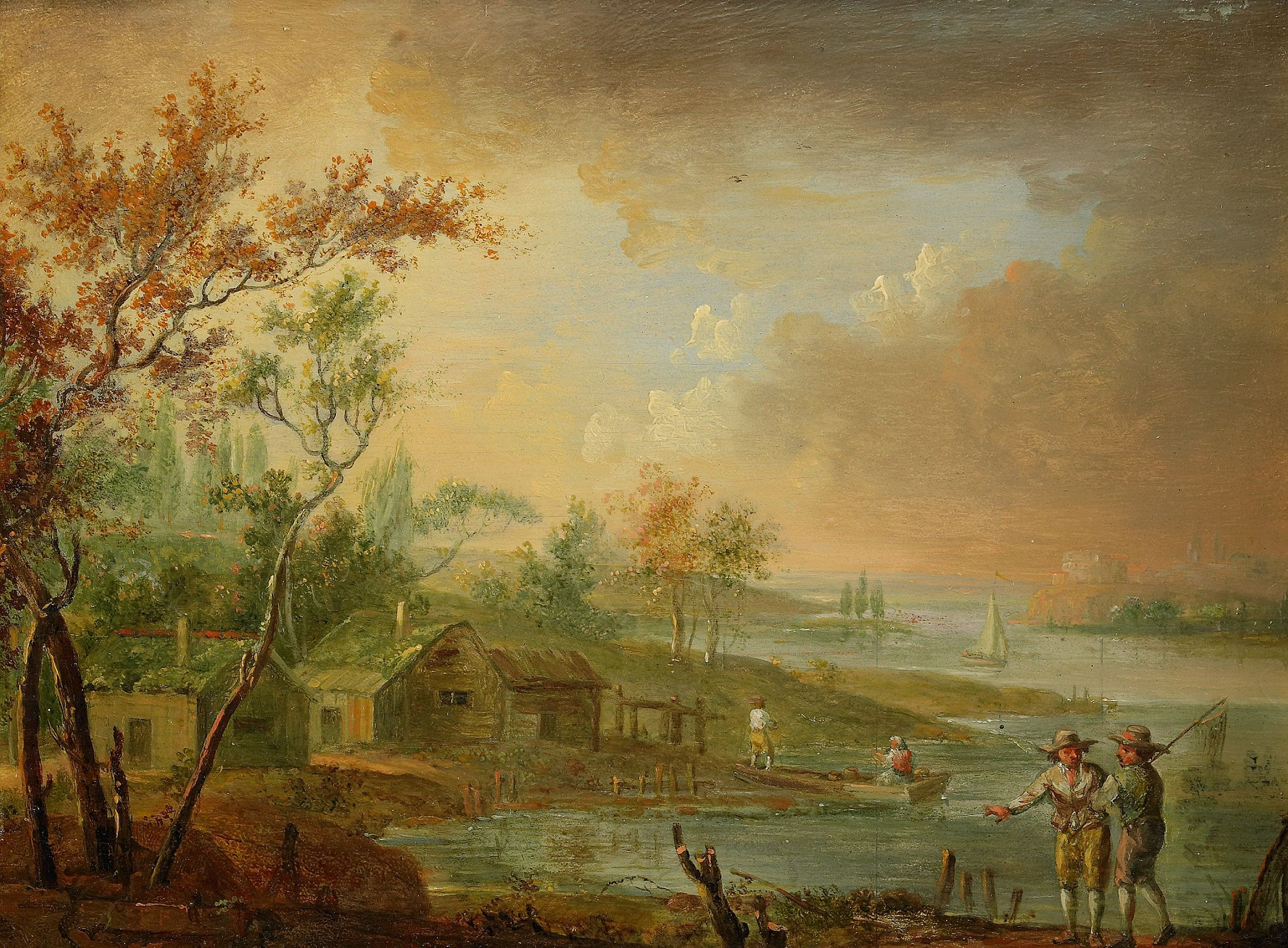
Sjölandskap med hus och figurer

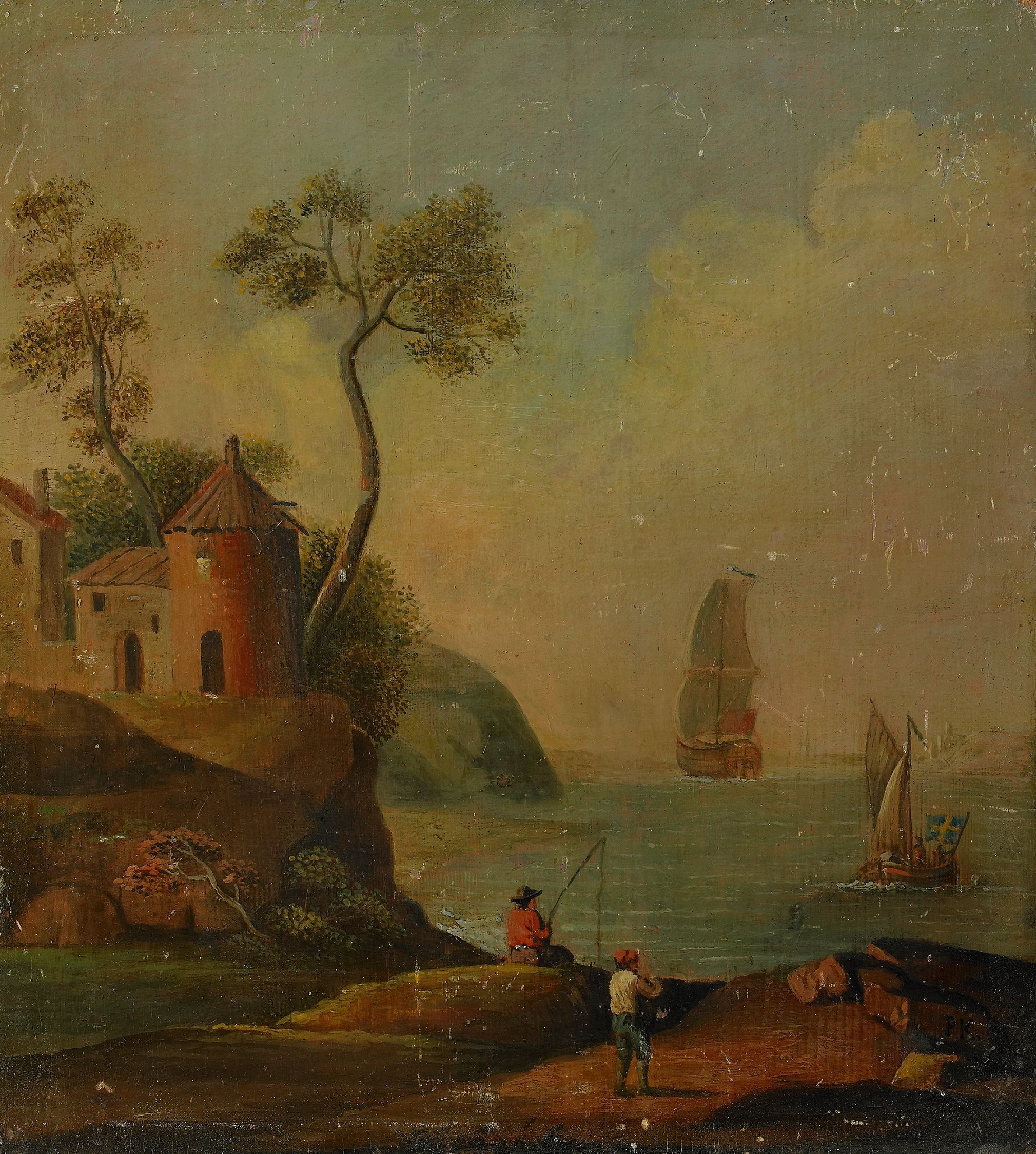
Pastoralt kustlandskap med figurstaffage

Johan Philip Korn (30 August 1727 – 29 March 1796) was a Swedish painter.

== Biography ==
Korn was born at Uddevalla in Västra Götaland County, Sweden. He was the son of Filip Ludvig Korn (1698-1741) and Maria Elfwing (1708-1742). He first began his career as a decorative painter. He was a student of artist Johan Sevenbom (1721-1784). After further studies he changed to landscape painting in the Rococo style of French artist François Boucher (1703–1770).

In 1759, Korn became master of the Stockholm Painting Office (Stockholms målarämbete) and held this position until his death. Korn became a member (agré) at the Swedish Royal Academy of Fine Arts in 1777.

== Other sources ==
- Korn, Johan Philip in Profile (1st edition, 1884)
- Carlquist, Gunnar, ed (1933). Swedish dictionary. Bd 15. Malmö: Swedish Uppslagsbok AB. Sid. 1091-92
