= Pieter Godfried Bertichen =

Dutch painter and lithographer

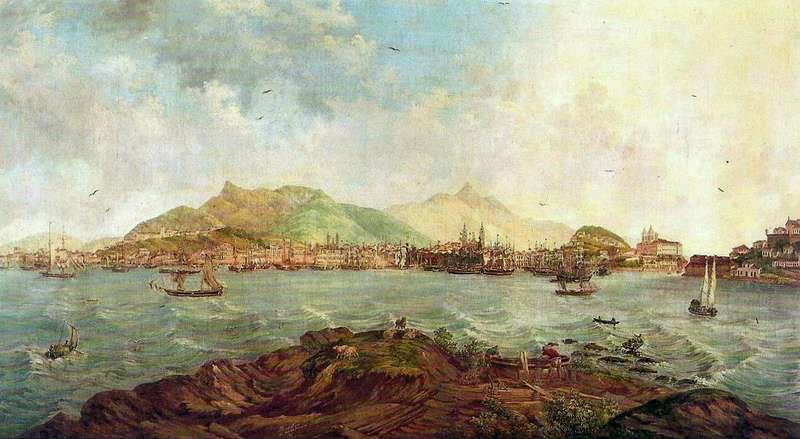
View of Rio de Janeiro taken from the Ilha dos Ratos by Pieter Godfried Bertichen, 1856

Pieter Godfried Bertichen (5 February 1796 – 1856) was a Dutch painter and lithographer who also lived and worked in Brazil.

Bertichen was born in Amsterdam and initially trained by Jurriaan Andriessen and worked there, until in 1833 he moved to Rio de Janeiro where he continued to live and work. He primarily painted and printed depictions of buildings and landscapes. He traveled around Brazil, and eventually settled in Petrópolis where he died in 1856.
