= Johan Georg Geitel =

German-born painter active in Finland

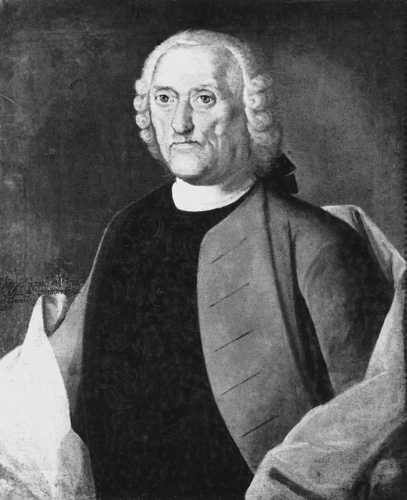
Johan Geitel portrait

Johan Georg Geitel (1683–1771), also Johann or Hans Jürgen Geitell, Geittel or Geittell, was a German-born portrait and religious painter who was the leading portraitist in Turku for several decades. Born in the Holy Roman Empire, he settled in Finland around 1750 and taught drawing at the Royal Academy of Turku from 1758 to 1763. He also painted altarpieces for several churches in the region.

== Life ==
Geitel was born in Geitelde, a village near Wolfenbüttel in Braunschweig, Germany. He moved to Finland around 1750, likely at the encouragement of his older brother Henrik Levin Geitell (1680–1760), who had entered Swedish service and was living in the Turku region at the time of his death.

When Geitel relocated to Turku, the painters Claes Lang and Jonas Bergman protested, claiming there was not enough work for all of them. The local registrar's office granted Geitel permission for only church historical paintings, though he later became the leading portraitist in the city. He taught drawing at the Royal Academy of Turku from 1758 to 1763, and from 1766 until his death held the title of portrait painter (konterfejare). He died in Turku in 1771 at the age of 88.

== Works ==
Geitel painted both portraits and religious works. The oldest known portraits bearing his signature are dated 1751, when he was 68 years old, suggesting that he was self-taught and took up painting late in life. Around twenty signed portraits have survived. His portraits are characterised by a stiff pose and a often greyish colour palette, though a chronological survey of his works shows a gradual development toward richer composition and more confident use of colour.

A portrait of the young Erik Gustaf Geitlin, signed and dated 1760, is one of the few surviving child portraits from Finland of this period. The boy is depicted in a blue uniform and red stockings, posing with a hunting rifle and a small dog. Geitel's remarkable productivity in old age is illustrated by the inscription on a 1769 portrait: J.G. Geitell alt 86 jahr, Pintz 9 juni 1769 in Abo.

Geitel also painted altarpieces for several churches in the region: Paimio (1755), Nousiainen (1756), Letala (1758), Lempäälä (1759), and Kisko (1763). In 1760 he painted an allegorical mural in the Bishop's Palace in Turku. Most of his surviving works are held at the Turku Provincial Museum.
