= Venetian secret =

1796-1797 British art fraud scandal

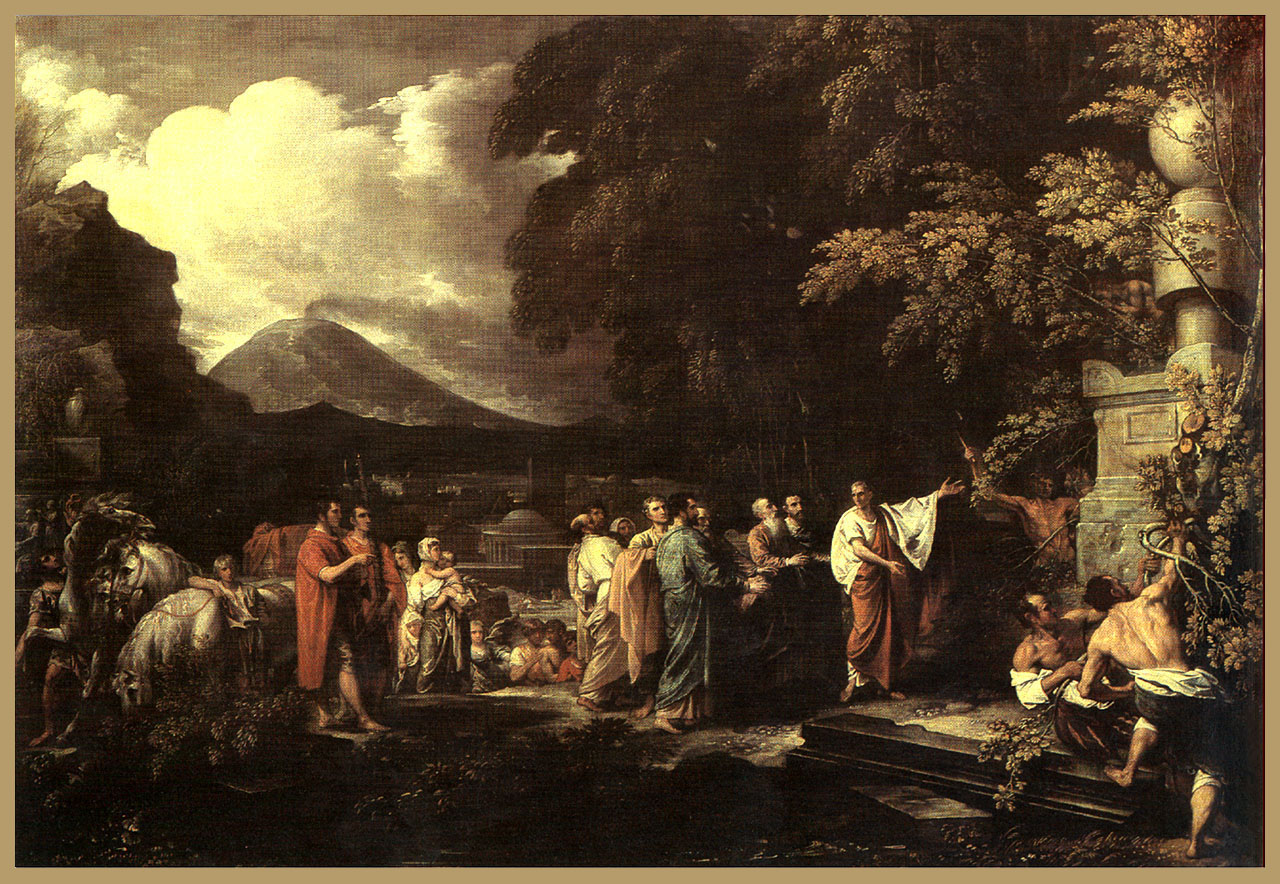
Benjamin West, Cicero Discovering the Tomb of Archimedes, 1797. The work was completed using a version of the supposed Venetian secret.

The Venetian secret was a major scandal in the art world of eighteenth-century Britain. It involved the alleged rediscovery of secret painting methods that Renaissance painters in Venice had purportedly used to produce dazzling effects of color. The secret turned out to be a fraud perpetrated by the artists Ann Jemima Provis and her father, Thomas Provis. They succeeded in deceiving prominent artists from the period, including the president of the Royal Academy of Arts in London, Benjamin West.

== Background ==
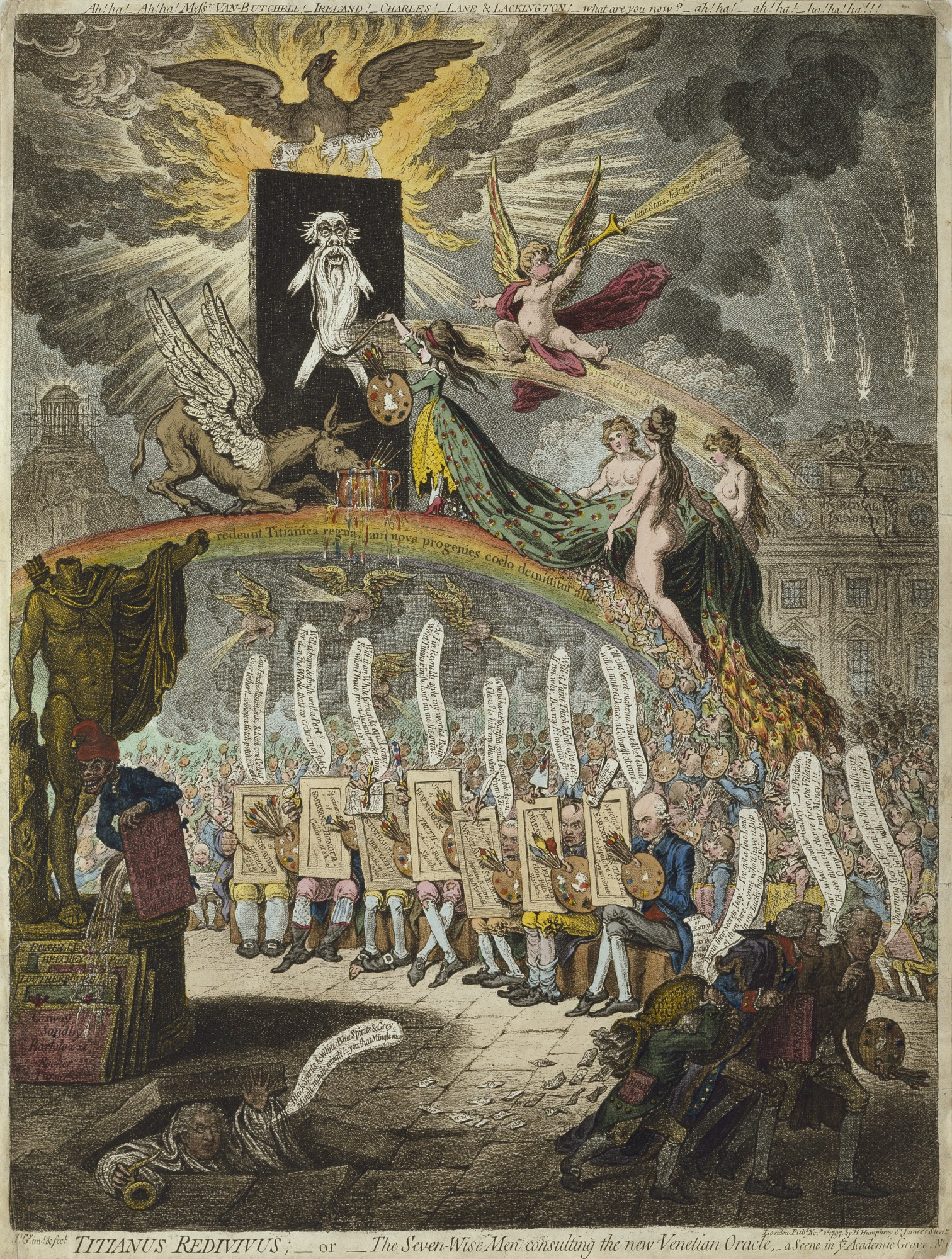
James Gillray's satirical image about the scandal.

In 1796, the artist Benjamin West, who was then president of the Royal Academy of Arts in London, purchased an old manuscript from Jemima and Thomas Provis that they claimed held the details of the materials and techniques that had been used by painters such as Titian, Tintoretto, and Veronese. West and his contemporaries venerated these artists for their mastery of color, assuming that their methods had been forgotten in the intervening centuries. West believed that the manuscript he purchased from the Provises was authentic, and he incorporated the techniques that it described into his own paintings, including Cicero Discovering the Tomb of Archimedes. Under West's influence, other artists in the Academy adopted the same methods.

== Scandal ==
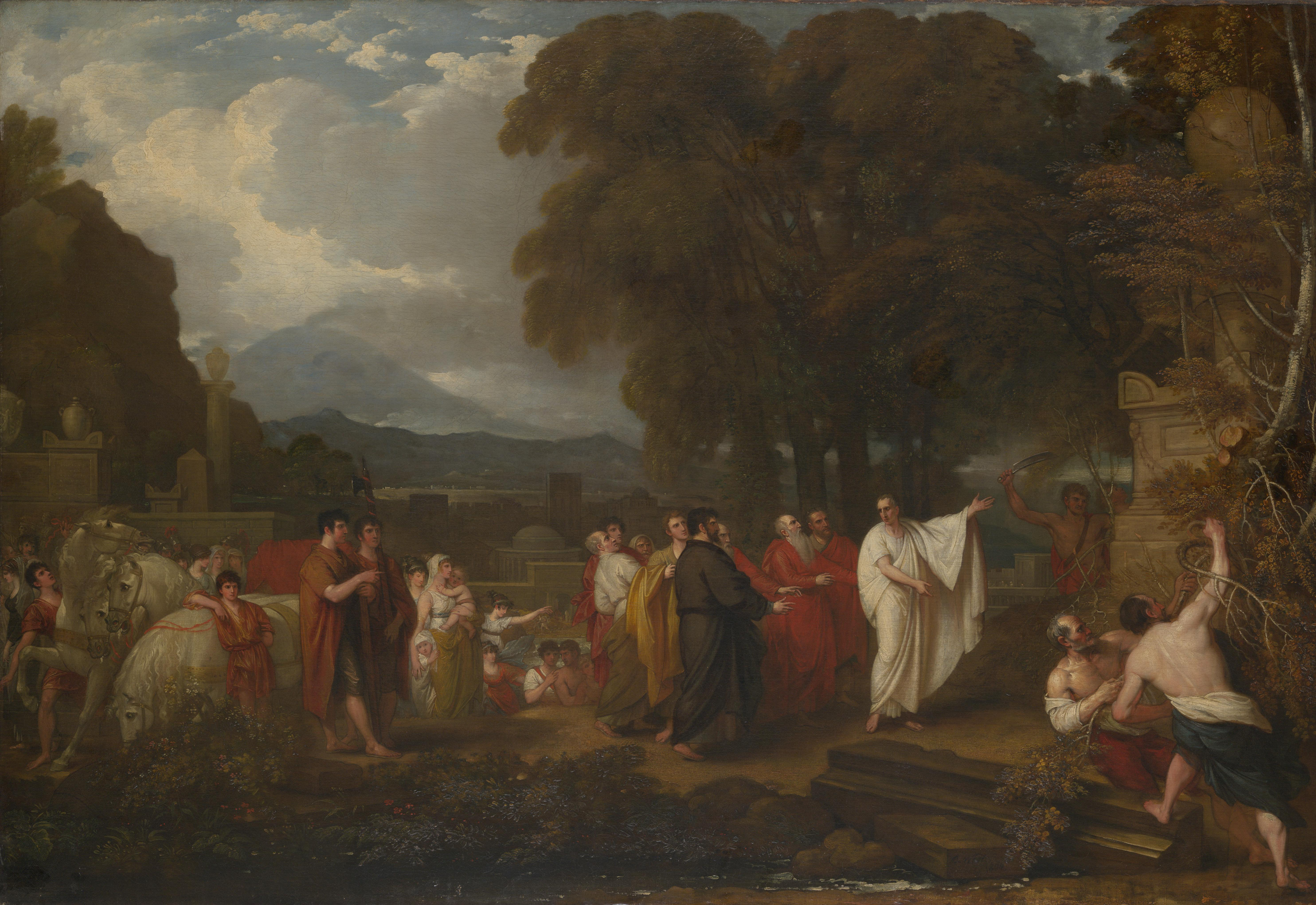
Benjamin West, Cicero Discovering the Tomb of Archimedes, 1804.

Within a year, the fraudulence of the secret had become clear to critics, who recognized that the works produced by West and other artists did not match the coloristic effects of Venetian painting. West and his followers were widely ridiculed in the British press. James Gillray produced a satirical illustration about the scandal in 1797. Benjamin West later produced another version of Cicero Discovering the Tomb of Archimedes in 1804 as "atonement" for his mistake.
