= Defeat of the Spanish Armada =

Painting by Philip James de Loutherbourg

The Defeat of the Spanish Armada
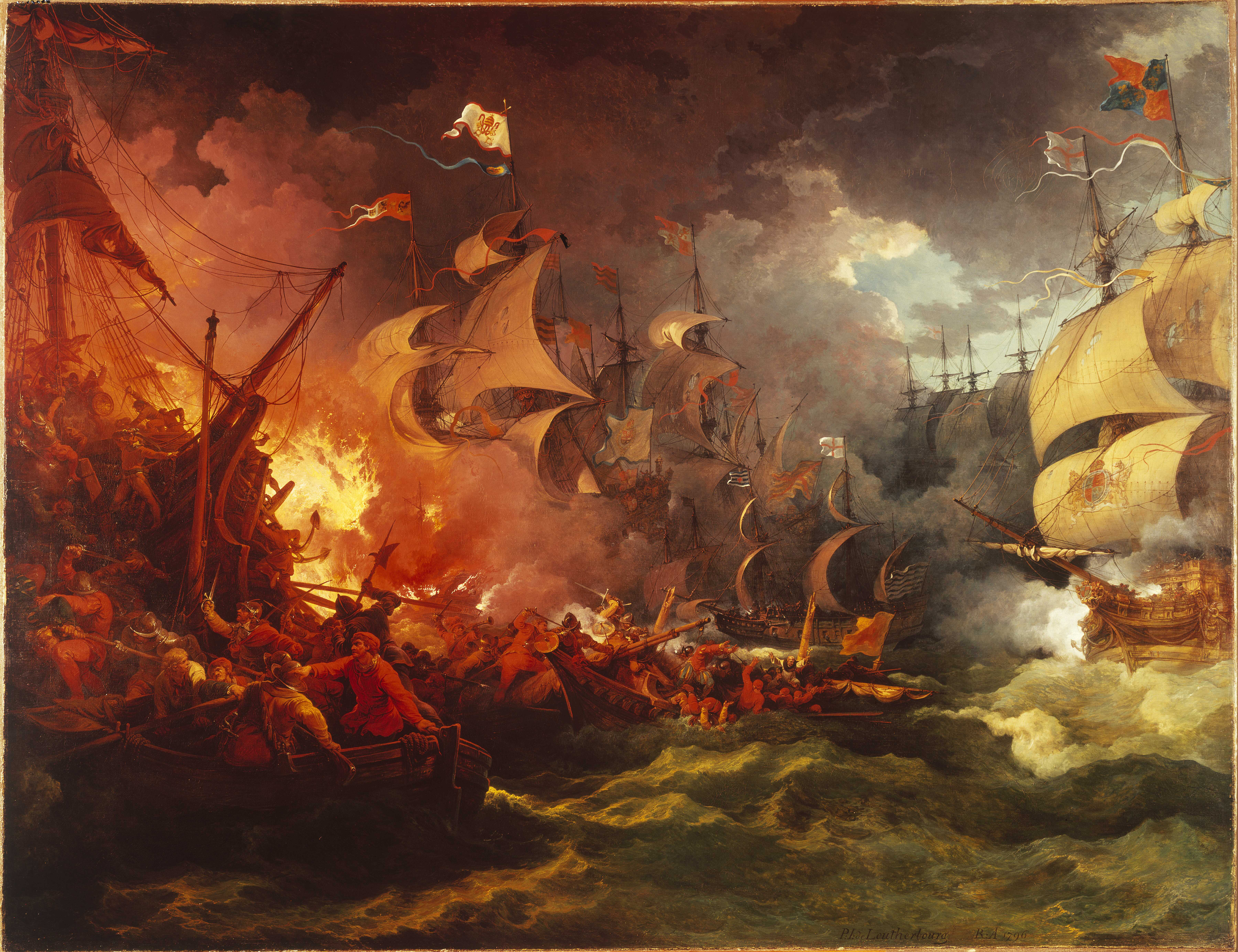
- Artist: Philip James de Loutherbourg
- Year: 1796
- Type: Oil on canvas, history painting
- Dimensions: 214.6 cm × 278.1 cm (84.5 in × 109.5 in)
- Location: National Maritime Museum, London

The Defeat of the Spanish Armada is a 1796 history painting by the French-born British artist Philip James de Loutherbourg. A battle seascape, it depicts the defeat of the Spanish Armada at the Battle of Gravelines in 1588, thwarting Philip II's attempt to invade England.

Loutherbourg produced several scenes of British naval victories around this time, when Britain was involved in the French Revolutionary Wars. Today the painting is in the collection of the National Maritime Museum in Greenwich.

== Bibliography ==
- Konstam, Angus. The Spanish Armada: The Great Enterprise Against England 1588. Bloomsbury Publishing, 2010.
- McIver, Gillian. Art and the Historical Film: Between Realism and the Sublime. Bloomsbury Publishing, 2022.
- O'Rourke, Stephanie. Art, Science, and the Body in Early Romanticism. Cambridge University Press, 2021.
