= Gilles-François Closson =

Belgian painter (1796–1842)

Gilles-François Closson (1796–1842), born in Liège, was a landscape painter, known as the Corot of Liège. In 1817, he went to Paris for seven years, where he was educated by Antoine-Jean Gros. In 1825 he went to Rome where he specialized in landscapes. He returned to Liège at the end of 1829. He became professor at the Academy of Liège in 1837 until his death.

== Works ==
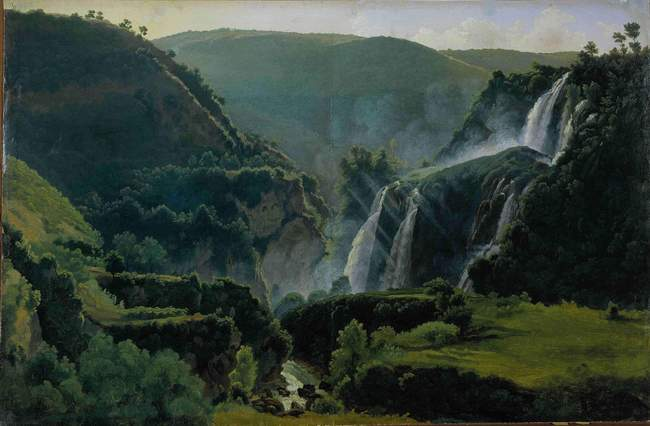
Paysage du Latium avec cascades

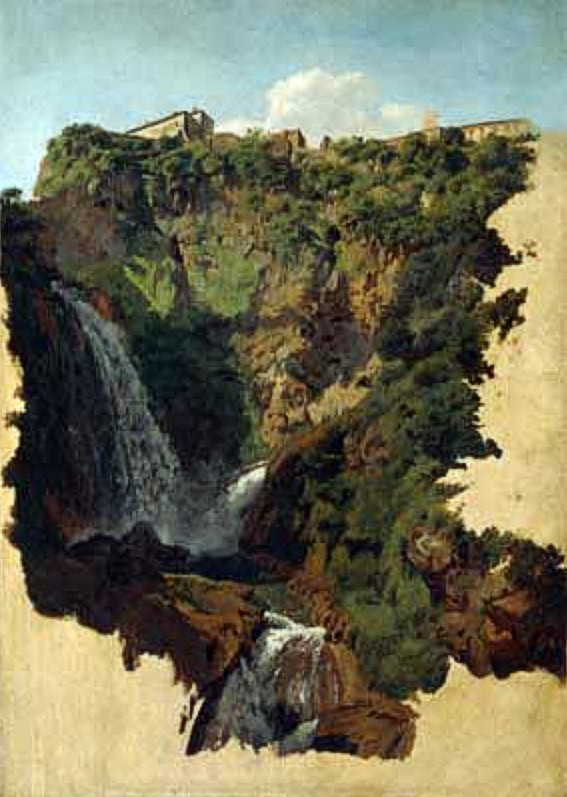
Cascade at Tivoli

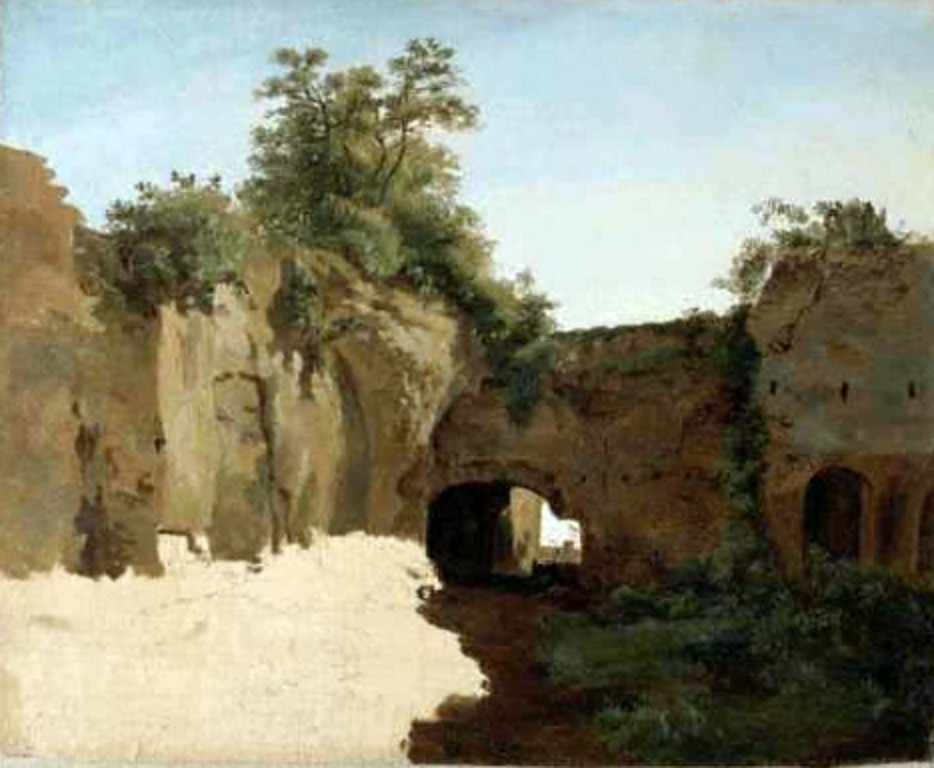
Baths of Caracalla
