= Portrait of Lord North =

Painting by Pompeo Batoni

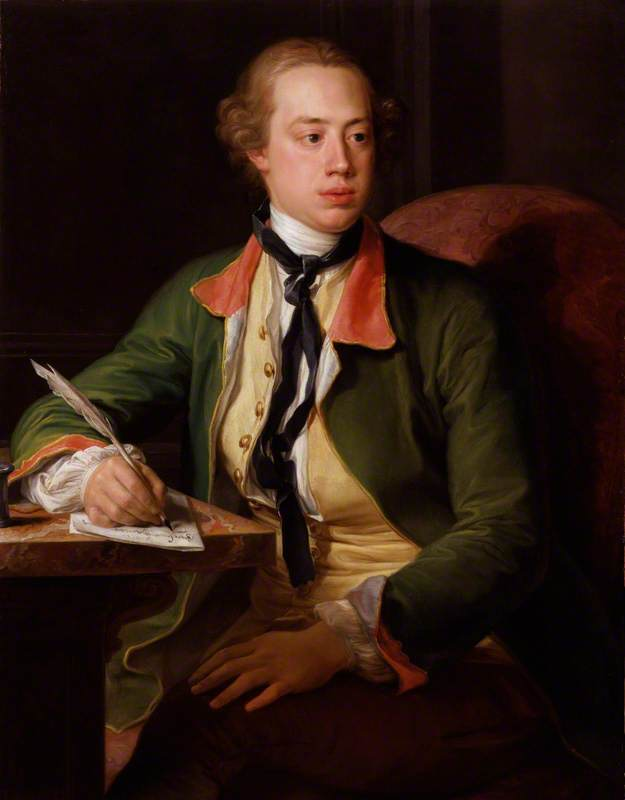
- Artist: Pompeo Batoni
- Year: 1753–1756
- Type: Oil on canvas, portrait
- Dimensions: 93.4 cm × 75.6 cm (36.8 in × 29.8 in)
- Location: National Portrait Gallery, London

Portrait of Lord North is a portrait painting of 1756 by the Italian artist Pompeo Batoni of the British politician and future prime minister Lord North.

Prime Minister from 1770 to 1782, North is best known for his leadership of Great Britain during the American War of Independence. Having resigned he then returned to government with the Fox–North coalition in alliance with his former enemy Charles James Fox. North was on his Grand Tour in Rome when he was sat for Batoni in January 1753, who specialised in depicting young British grand tourists. It took some time to complete and was only finished by 1756. North's travelling companion and half-brother Lord Dartmouth was also painted by the artist. In 1754 North was elected MP for Banbury, launching his political career. His title was a courtesy one and he sat in the House of Commons during his career as a leading politician.

The portrait was acquired by the National Portrait Gallery, London in 1992.

== Bibliography ==
- Bowron, Edgar Peters & Kerber, Peter Björn. Pompeo Batoni: Prince of Painters in Eighteenth-century Rome. Yale University Press, 2007.
- Ingamells, John. National Portrait Gallery Mid-Georgian Portraits, 1760–1790. National Portrait Gallery, 2004.
- Whiteley, Peter. Lord North: The Prime Minister Who Lost America. A&C Black, 1996.
