= Gerhard Bockman =

Dutch painter

Gerhard Bockman (1686–1773) was a Dutch portrait painter and mezzotint engraver.

== Works ==
Bockman was known as an artist in Amsterdam; by 1711, he was active in England, and was a subscriber of the Great Queen Street Academy.

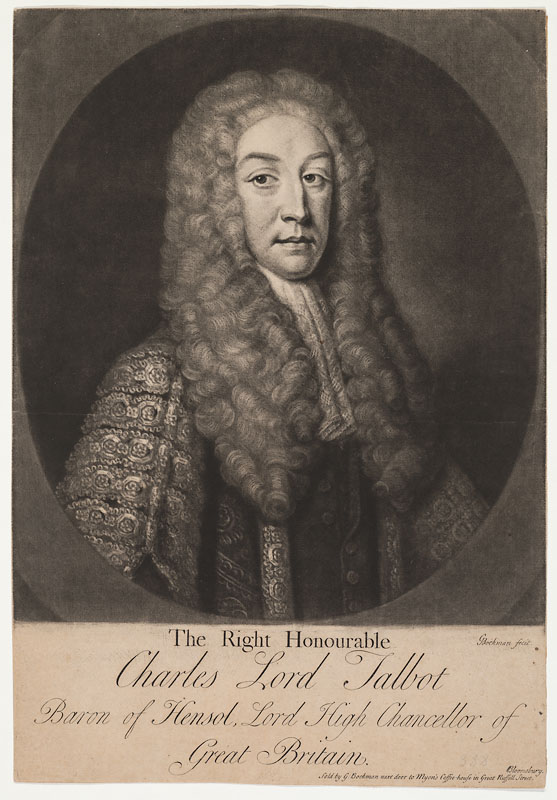
Engraving of Charles Talbot, 1st Baron Talbot

He painted several portraits of William Augustus, Duke of Cumberland, and a life-size half-length of Edward Russell, 1st Earl of Orford. He copied after Godfrey Kneller, and engraved portraits in mezzotint after Anthony van Dyck, Jacob van Loo, Michael Dahl, James Worsdale, and others. He painted and engraved (1743) a picture of St Dunstan holding the Devil by the nose with tongs. Karl Heinrich von Heinecken mentions amongst his portraits those of Thomas Chubb the deist, of Thomas Pelham-Holles, 1st Duke of Newcastle, of Charles Talbot, 1st Baron Talbot, and of William Walker.
