= Pieter Pietersz Nedek =

Dutch Golden Age painter

Pieter P. Nedek
- Born: 1616; Amsterdam, Dutch Empire
- Died: 1686 (aged 69–70); Amsterdam, Dutch Empire
- Movement: Dutch Golden Age

Pieter Pietersz Nedek (1616–1686) was a Dutch Golden Age painter.

He was born and died in Amsterdam. According to Arnold Houbraken, he was the same age as Govert Flinck and was a landscape painter who had been a pupil of Pieter Lastman. He died a bachelor at the age of 70.

According to the RKD, he was a pupil of Lastman, and is known for his winter landscapes.
