= Gaspard Duché de Vancy =

French painter

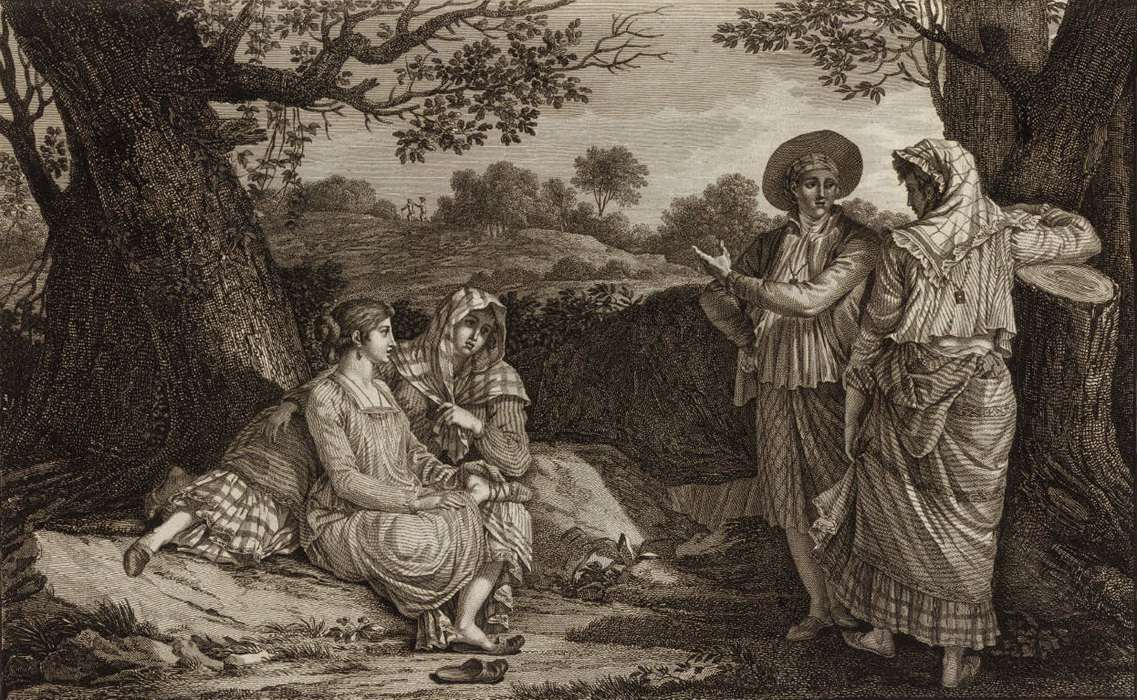
The costumes of the inhabitants of Manila, engraving after a 1787 drawing by Duché de Vancy that he made during the expedition that later ended in tragedy in 1788

Gaspard Duché de Vancy (1756–1788) was a French artist of the 18th century. He grew up in Vienna and exhibited not only at Paris' Salon of Young Artists (1781), but also at London's Royal Academy (1784). He was particularly active in portraiture, producing images of Stanislaus of Poland (1784), the secretary of the Kingdom of Naples (1784) and Marie Antoinette, and was also taken on as the official artist of the La Perouse expedition, on which he disappeared. His skull was thought to have been found off Vanikoro in April 2003, but DNA tests proved inconclusive.

== See also ==
- List of people who disappeared mysteriously at sea
