= Zhang Zongcang =

Chinese landscape painter

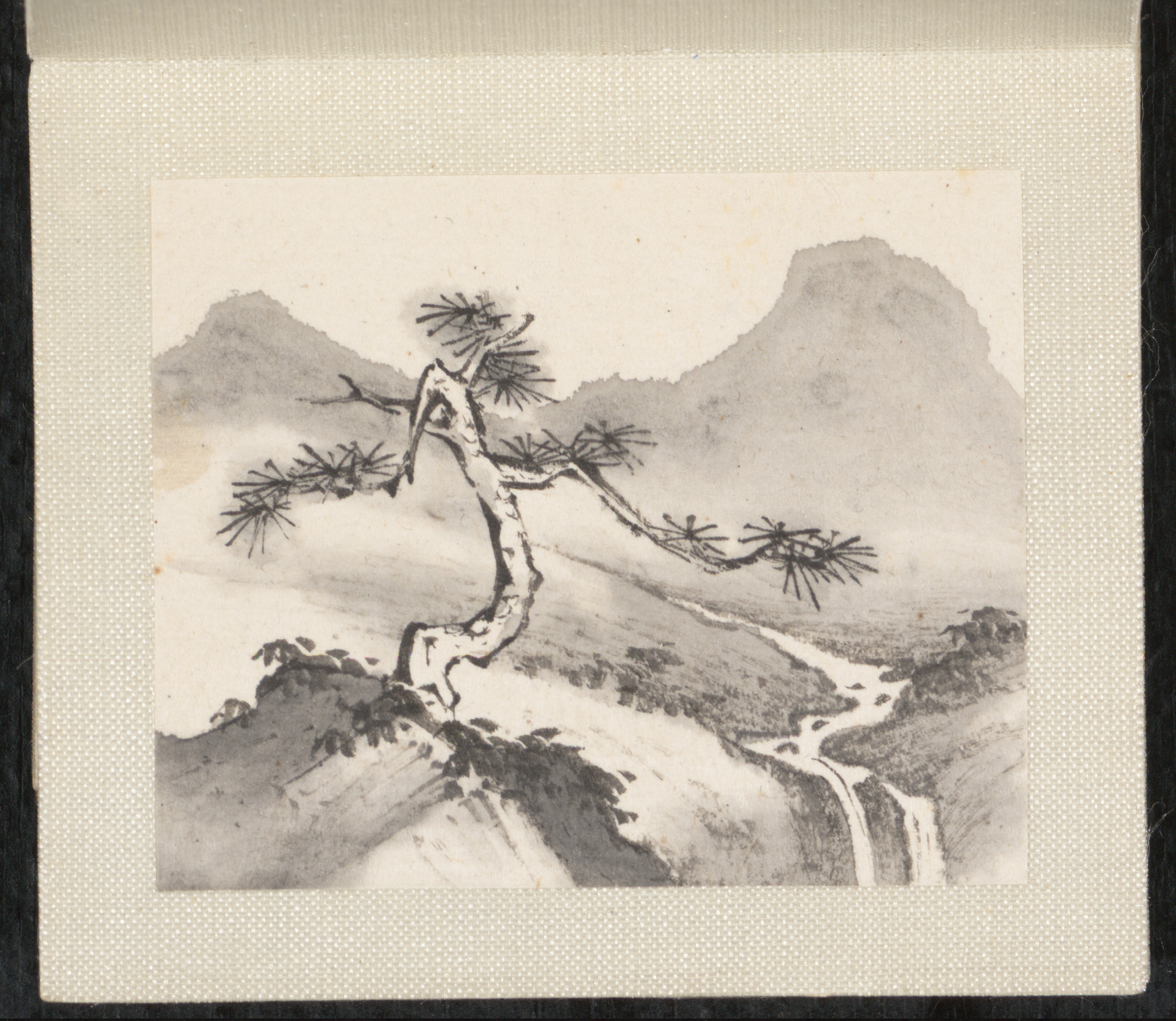

Zhang Zongcang (Chinese: 张宗苍; 1686–1756), courtesy name as Mocun, is a famed Chinese landscape painter in the Qing Dynasty. He was born in Suzhou, Jiangsu Province.

His style names were 'Mochun' and 'Mocen' and his sobriquet was 'Huangchun'. He served in the palace, and studied under Huang Ding. He liked using dry brush, executed in a strong style.
