= Pierre Granier =

French sculptor

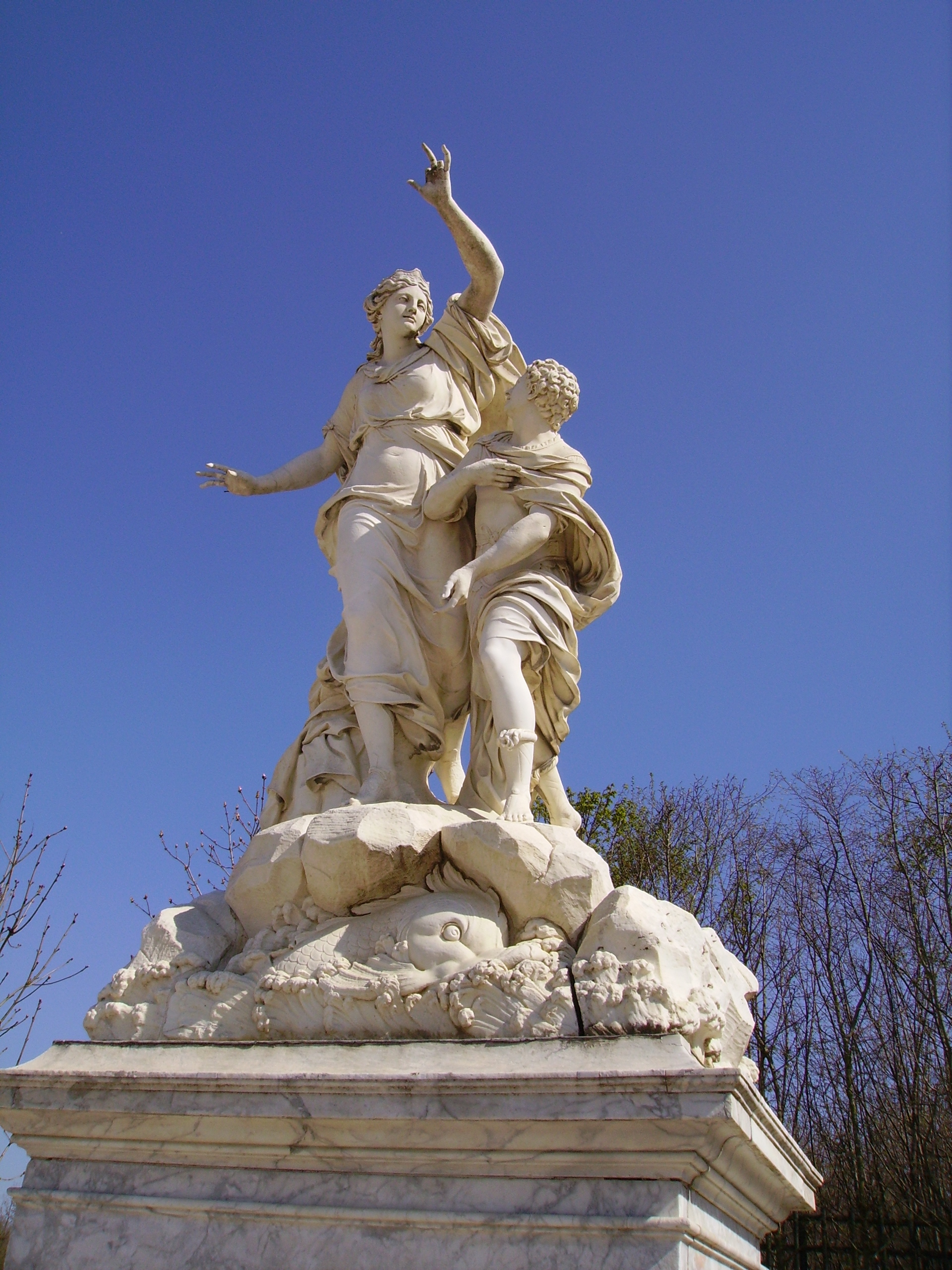
Ino and Mélicerte, Versailles's garden

Pierre Granier (1635 — 6 October 1715) was a proficient but minor French sculptor, trained in the excellent atelier of François Girardon who produced a generation of highly competent sculptors for the Bâtiments du Roi. Granier served as a modest member of the extensive team that provided sculpture for the Château de Versailles and its gardens. Strict control over the subjects, scale, materials and to a great extent the design of sculpture for Versailles was exercised by the premier peintre du Roi, Charles Le Brun. According to Antoine-Nicolas Dézallier d'Argenville, Le Brun provided a wax model for Granier's marble group Ino and Melicertes, and a Shepherdess was sculpted after a sketch given by Le Brun.

Born at Les Matelles near Montpellier in what was then the province of Languedoc, he was an official of the Académie royale de peinture et de sculpture, where he was received in 1686 and to whom he had presented his bust of Louis XIV.

When the marble sculpture of a god discovered at Smyrna was offered to Louis XIV, Granier was commissioned in 1686 to provide a missing right arm, raised and brandishing a thunderbolt: the result was the so-called Jupiter de Smyrne, now conserved at the Louvre Museum.
