= Hugh Robinson (painter) =

British painter

Hugh Robinson (1756–1796) was a British artist, best known for his history paintings and portraits. His portrait of his sister's son, Thomas Teesdale as a young boy tugging on a kite string, entitled Boy with a Kite is considered "his masterpiece."

== Biography ==
Robinson was born in 1756 in Malton, North Yorkshire. In 1779, he enrolled in the Royal Academy of Arts, working as a portraitist while aspiring to work in the genre of history painting.

In 1787, Robinson travelled to Italy to spend the next ten years studying the masterworks of Europe. Robinson’s travels were sponsored by Sir George Beaumont, a significant patron of British art, along with two other wealthy benefactors. In 1796, on his return voyage to England, Robinson died of consumption, and his entire body of work he had produced in Continental Europe was lost at sea.

In the 1960s, Robinson's 1782 painting Head of a Beggar was badly damaged in a housefire in Hong Kong, and subsequently repainted.
