= Domenico Pozzi =

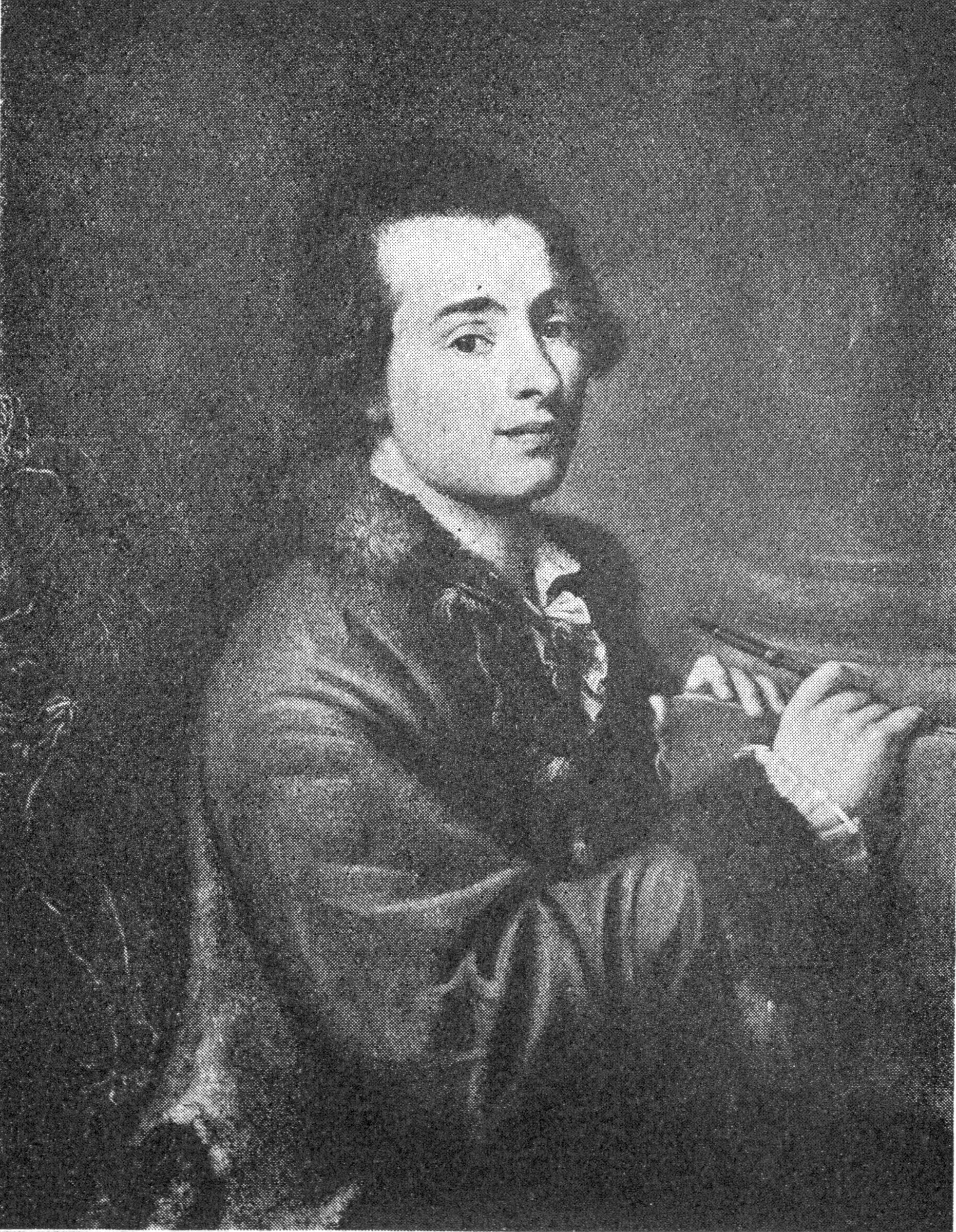

Domenico Pozzi (August 3, 1745 – November 2, 1796) was a painter of Swiss origin.

He was born in Castel San Pietro to Swiss stuccoist Francesco Pozzi (1704–1789). He first trained with his father and Giuseppe Baldrighi and then entered the Academy of Milan. After some time he went to Rome and then to Germany, where he painted for the library of the Count von Castelli at Mannheim. He afterwards worked in Solothurn, Mendrisio, and in the Palace of the Marquis Odescalchi. He died in Milan.
