= Walter Beekerk =

Dutch painter

- Born: Walter Beekerk; 1756; Netherlands
- Died: 1796; Netherlands?
- Occupation: painter

Walter Beekerk (1756–1796) was a Dutch painter known by his disposition of lights and shadows.
