= Pietro Giovanni Abbati =

Italian painter

- Born: Parma, Italy
- Died: 1745; Parma, Italy
- Education: Dominican monastery San Pietro Martire
- Known for: Landscape painting, Engraving

Pietro Giovanni Abbati (in English, Peter John Abbati; died 1745) was an Italian set designer, painter and engraver.

Abbati was born in Parma. He was active in the cities of Turin, Parma, Bologna and Vienna. Pupil of Ferdinando Galli-Bibiena, Abbati published several works in 1707. He devoted himself mainly to landscape painting and engraving. He died in Parma in 1745.

== Life ==
Pietro Giovanni Abbati was a son of Bernardo Abbati and was born in Parma in the second half of the 17th century. He received his education in the Dominican monastery San Pietro Martire in Parma. The friars noticed Abbati's artistic talent and had him trained by Ferdinando Galli-Bibiena. He was as versatile as his teacher in festive decoration, architecture and painting.

Abbati is first mentioned in a document of 25 August 1683, where he is listed as a witness. Apparently, the Ducal Court of Parma valued Abbati's artistic ability, since it provided him in 1706 with a letter of recommendation for a stay in Venice. During this time Abbati prepared publications of stage sets and brochures after the drafts of his teacher Ferdinando Galli-Bibiena, including The Varie opere di Prospettiva, a collection of 72 mostly large-format plates documenting Galli-Bibiena's early activity as a designer of theatrical scenery and ephemeral architecture. It was assembled by Abbati who had trained with this master during his tenure as "Pittore di Corte" to the Farnese Dukes of Parma, in collaboration with Carlo Antonio Buffagnotti, an industrious printmaker from Bologna. In 1713 Abbati was a subprior at the Turin painter's guild. The following year he designed the theater decorations for the new ducal theater in Parma on the occasion of the local performance of Giuseppe Maria Orlandini's opera Carlo, Re di Alemagna. On this occasion, he was referred to as a trusted servant of the Duke of Parma. He remained a court artist of the Farnese and received from them a fixed monthly income of 73 lire starting from November 1718. In 1727, however, this salary was not paid to him. For his procurement of costumes for a horse dance performance in honor of the Duke, according to a receipt, he received 1500 lire in January 1733.

As a stage painter Abbati worked not only in Parma, but also in Urbania, Turin, Bologna and Vienna. He also created paintings and etchings. In Parma he gave lessons to Giuseppe Pellizzoli and Agostino Filippi.
