= 1812 in art =

Events in the year 1812 in Art.

== Events ==
- The last of the Elgin Marbles are removed from the Parthenon in Athens and shipped to the UK.
- Hokusai publishes his first etehon (art manual), Quick Lessons in Simplified Drawing.

== Awards ==
- Prix de Rome (for sculpture) – François Rude

== Works ==
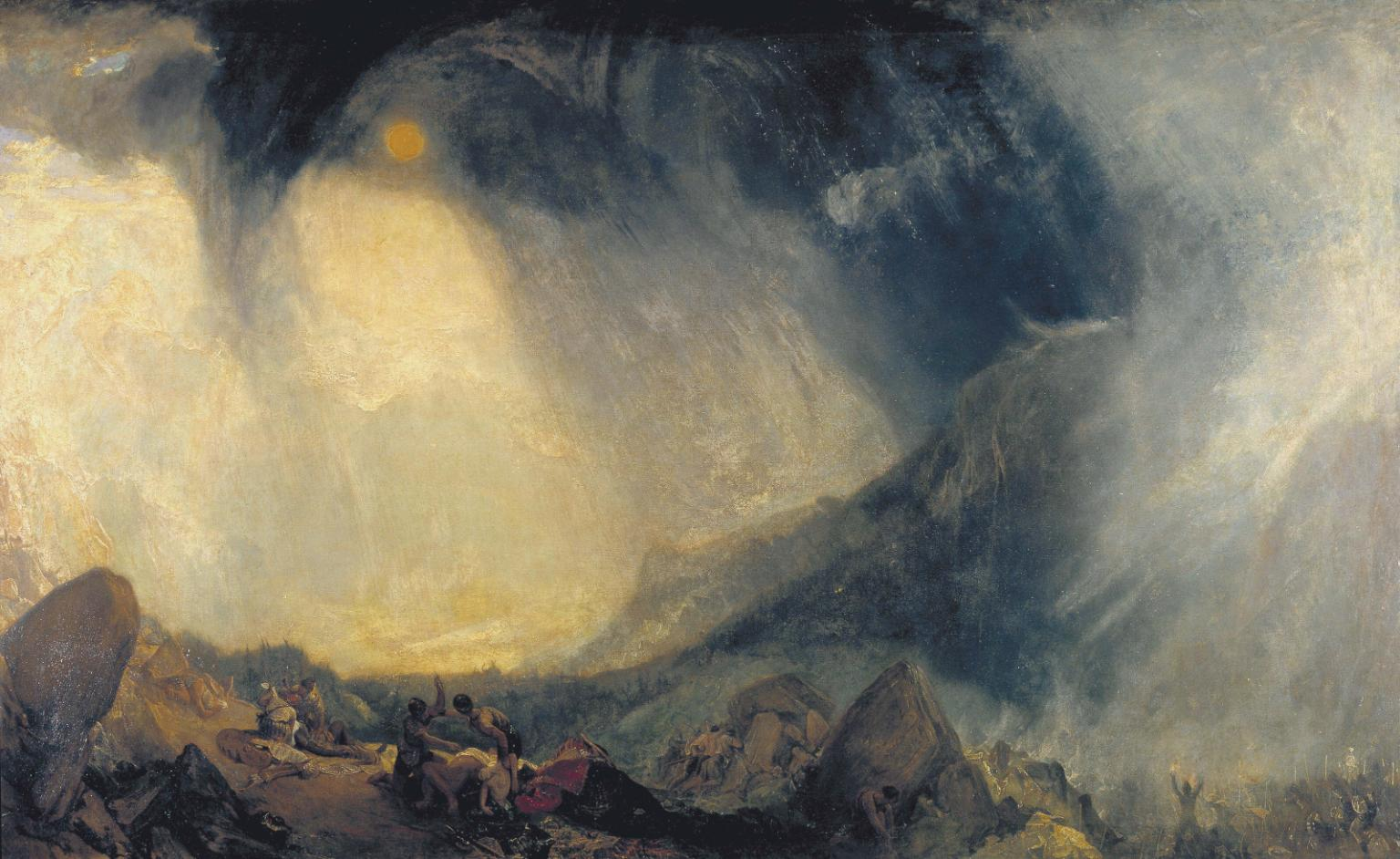
Turner – Snow Storm: Hannibal and his Army Crossing the Alps

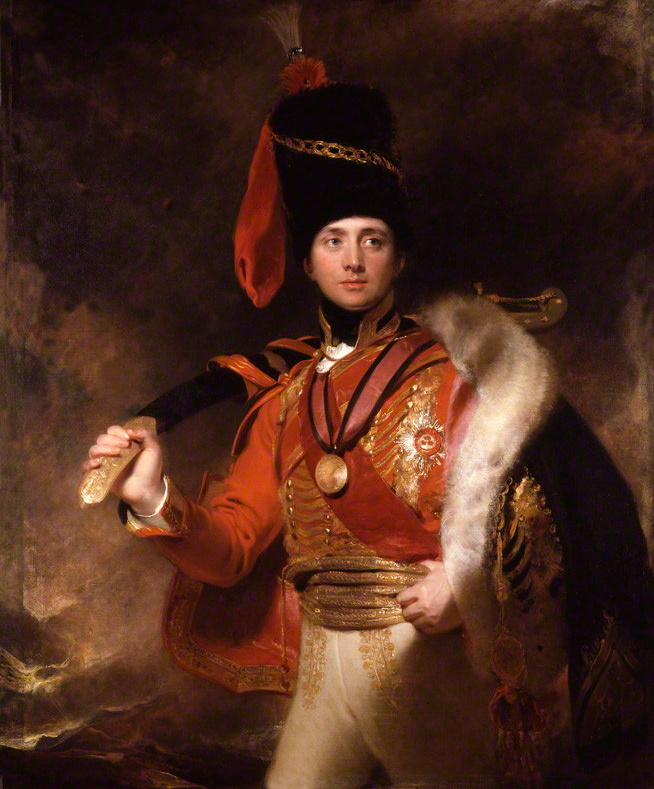
Lawrence – Portrait of Sir Charles Stewart.

- William Beechey – Portrait of Joseph Nollekens
- Pietro Benvenuti – The Oath of the Saxons
- Louis-Léopold Boilly – The Geography Lesson
- Augustus Wall Callcott – Littlehampton Pier
- William Collins – May Day
- John Constable – Flatford Mill from the Lock
- Marie-Philippe Coupin de la Couperie – The Tragic Love of Francesca da Rimini
- Jacques-Louis David – The Emperor Napoleon in His Study at the Tuileries
- Martin Drolling – Portrait of Adéone
- Alexandre Dufay – The Wedding Banquet of Napoleon and Marie Louise
- Caspar David Friedrich
  - The Garden Terrace
  - The Tombs of the Old Heroes
- François Gérard – Portrait of Marie Louise
- Théodore Géricault – The Charging Chasseur
- Francisco Goya
  - Portrait of the Duke of Wellington (originally painted)
  - Equestrian Portrait of the Duke of Wellington
  - The Burial of the Sardine (possible date)
- Antoine-Jean Gros – Interview Between Napoleon and Francis II after the Battle of Austerlitz
- Guillaume Guillon-Lethière – The Judgement of Paris
- Jean-Auguste-Dominique Ingres
  - Portrait of the Countess of Tournon
  - Virgil Reading the Aeneid to Augustus, Livia and Octavia
- Thomas Lawrence
  - John Philip Kemble as Cato
  - Sir Charles Stewart
- Anicet Charles Gabriel Lemonnier – In the Salon of Madame Geoffrin in 1755
- John Linnell – Kensington Gravel Pits
- John Martin – Sadak in Search of the Waters of Oblivion
- Charles Meynier – Napoleon's Return to the Island of Lobau After the Battle of Essling
- François Mulard – The Death of General Causse at the Battle of Dego
- Henry Raeburn – Colonel Alasdair Macdonell of Glengarry
- Pierre Révoil – The Tournament (Le tournoi)
- Gilbert Stuart – Portrait of Henry Dearborn
- J. M. W. Turner
  - Snow Storm: Hannibal and his Army Crossing the Alps
  - St Mawes at the Pilchard Season
  - Teignmouth
- David Wilkie
  - Blind-Man's Buff
  - Boys Digging for Rats

== Births ==
- March 1 – Augustus Pugin, English architect, illustrator, and designer (died 1852)
- April 15 – Théodore Rousseau, French landscape painter (died 1867)
- May 12 – Edward Lear, English painter, illustrator and humorous writer (died 1888)
- June 30 – Josabeth Sjöberg, Swedish painter and music teacher (died 1882)
- July 9 – Thomas Musgrave Joy, English portrait painter (died 1866)

== Deaths ==
- February 20 – Felix Ivo Leicher, Czech-born Viennese painter of altarpieces and secular works (born 1727)
- March 2 – John Raphael Smith, English painter and engraver (born 1751)
- March 11 – Philip James de Loutherbourg, naturalized English theatrical scene painter (born 1740)
- March 14 – Robert Cromek, English engraver and art dealer (born 1770)
- March 18 – Johann Ziegler, Austrian painter of landscapes and city scenes (born 1749)
- March 29 – Johann Friedrich Dryander, German-born portrait painter (born 1756)
- May 92 – James Nixon, English miniature-painter (born 1741)
- May 12 – William Burgess, English painter and art teacher (date of birth unknown)
- June 16 – Franz Pforr, German Nazarene movement painter (born 1788)
- June 21 – Johann Friedrich August Tischbein (Leipziger Tischbein), painter (born 1750)
- August 2 – Edward Smyth, Irish sculptor (born 1749)
- August 23 – Tethart Philipp Christian Haag, German-born Dutch portrait artist (born 1737)
- October 21 – Heneage Finch, 4th Earl of Aylesford, British peer, politician and artist (born 1751)
- December 20 – Kazimierz Wojniakowski, Polish painter (born 1771)
- December 24 – George Beck, American painter and poet (born 1749)
- unknown dates
  - Robert Cromek, English engraver, editor, art dealer and entrepreneur (born 1770)
  - Antoine Michel Filhol, French engraver (born 1759)
  - Francis Jukes, English etcher, engraver and publisher (born 1745)
  - Michelangelo Maestri, Italian painter (date of birth unknown)
  - Giulio Traballesi, Italian designer and engraver (born 1727)
