= 1759 in art =

Events from the year 1759 in art.

== Events ==
- 25 August – The Salon of 1759 opens at the Louvre in Paris
- Thomas Gainsborough and his family move to Bath, England.

== Works ==
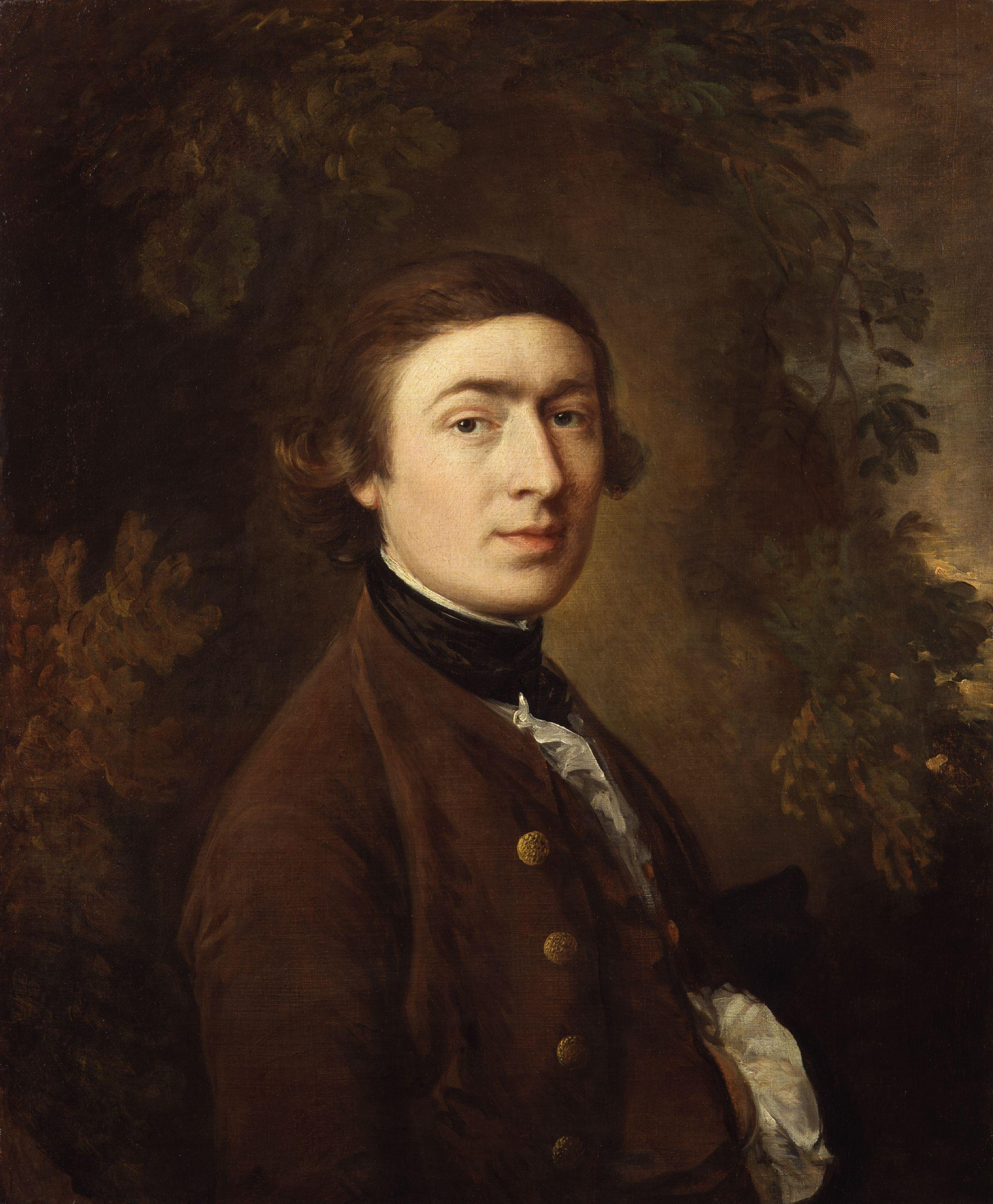
Thomas Gainsborough, Self-Portrait 1759

- Giambettino Cignaroli – Death of Cato
- Thomas Gainsborough
  - Self-Portrait
  - Thomas Wollaston
- Joshua Reynolds – Kitty Fisher as Cleopatra Dissolving the Pearl
- Samuel Scott – A View of Alexander Pope's Villa, Twickenham
- John Shackleton – George II (British Museum, London)

== Births ==
- January 21 – François Baillairgé, Canadian artist of woodworking, wood-carving and architecture (died 1830)
- February 10 – Carlo Lasinio, Italian engraver (died 1838)
- March 1 – Christian Gullager, Danish artist specializing in portraits and theatrical scenery (died 1826)
- July 10 – Pierre-Joseph Redouté, Belgian flower painter (died 1840)
- July 27 – Pierre Charles Baquoy, French painter and engraver especially of famous historical characters (died 1829)
- August 15 – Jean-Baptiste Jacques Augustin, French miniature painter (died 1832)
- August 16 – Carl Frederik von Breda, Swedish painter to the Swedish court (died 1818)
- December 16 – Charles Guillaume Alexandre Bourgeois, French physicist and painter (died 1832)
- December 29 – Julius Caesar Ibbetson, landscape painter (died 1817)
- date unknown
  - Jean-Baptiste Audebert, French natural history artist (died 1800)
  - Henri Auguste, Parisian gold- and silversmith (died 1816)
  - Louis-André-Gabriel Bouchet, French historical painter (died 1842)
  - Adam Buck, Irish neo-classical portraitist and miniature painter (died 1833)
  - Antoine Michel Filhol, French engraver (died 1812)
  - John Frederick Miller, English illustrator (died 1796)
  - Rafael Ximeno y Planes, Spanish painter (died 1825)

== Deaths ==
- January 15 - Bernardo Germán de Llórente, Spanish painter of the late-Baroque period (born 1685)
- March 27 – August Johann Rösel von Rosenhof, miniature painter and naturalist (born 1705)
- April 4 – Christoffer Foltmar, Danish painter of miniatures and organist (born 1718)
- April 20 – Jeong Seon, Korean landscape painter (born 1676)
- May 12 – Lambert-Sigisbert Adam, French sculptor (born 1700)
- June 20 – Margareta Capsia, Finnish painter (born 1682)
- July 25 - Theodoor Verhaegen, sculptor from the Southern Netherlands (born 1701)
- September 27 – Gaetano Fanti, Italian fresco painter (born 1687)
- date unknown
  - Placido Costanzi, Italian painter of the Costanzi family of artists (born 1702)
  - Bernardo de' Dominici, Italian art historian and painter (born 1683)
  - Alberto Pullicino, Maltese painter (born 1719)
  - Wang Shishen, Chinese painter (born 1686)
  - Kaspar Anton von Baroni-Cavalcabo, Italian painter (born 1682)
