= 1749 in art =

Events from the year 1749 in art.

== Events ==
- February – A Roman statue of Cupid and Psyche is discovered in the garden of the canonico Panicale on the Aventine Hill and given by Pope Benedict XIV to the Capitoline Museums, where it is conserved.
- John Shackleton is appointed Principal Painter in Ordinary to King George II of Great Britain.

== Works ==
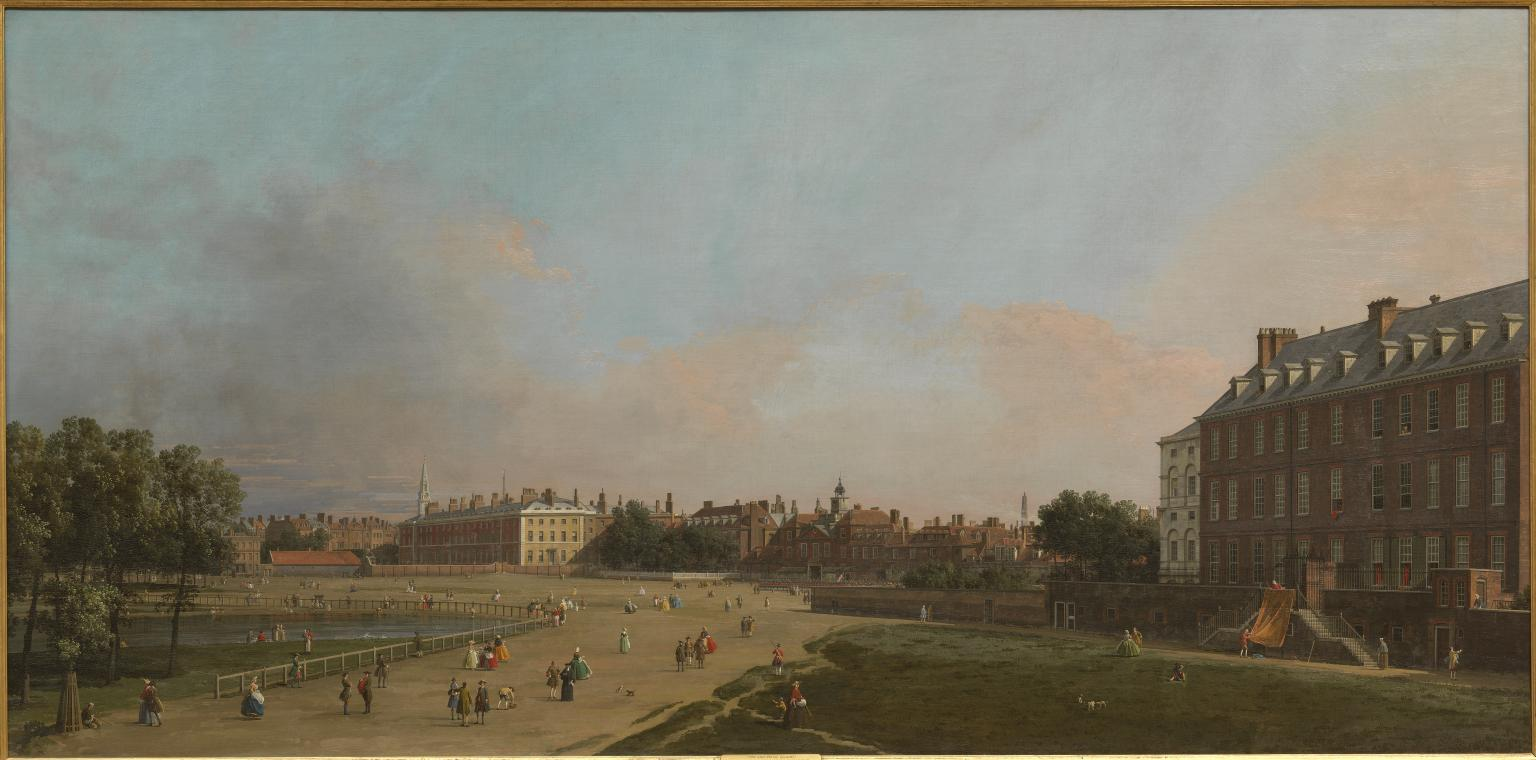
Old Horse Guards by Canaletto.

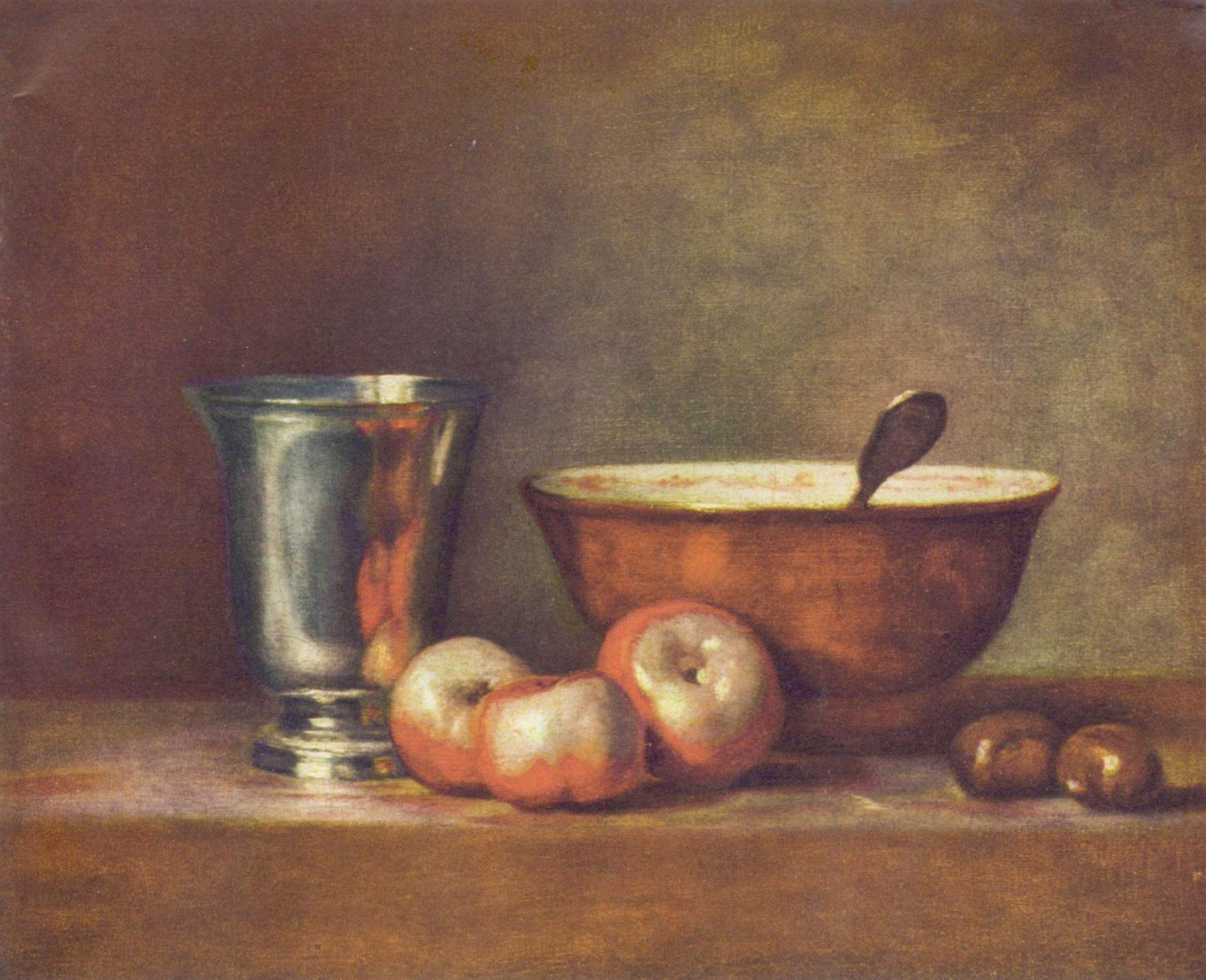
Chardin, The Silver Beaker

- Canaletto completes his painting of Warwick Castle now at the Yale Center for British Art, New Haven, Connecticut.
  - Syon House
- Jean-Baptiste-Siméon Chardin refines technique for reflected light on glass and silver, painting The Silver Beaker.
- Thomas Hudson – Portrait of Admiral Byng
- Jean-Baptiste Oudry paints Clara the Rhinoceros, a portrait of the rhinoceros Clara at this date on display in Paris.
- Joshua Reynolds – Portrait of Augustus Keppel
- Louis-François Roubiliac's memorial to the Duke of Argyll, his first work in Westminster Abbey, is installed.
- Samuel Scott – Lord Anson's Victory off Cape Finisterre
- Gervase Spencer paints a miniature self-portrait.

== Births ==
- January 13 – Friedrich Müller, painter, narrator, lyricist and dramatist (died 1825)
- January 23 – Joseph Reinhart, Swiss painter and draftsman (died 1824)
- February 14 – Henry Pelham, American painter, engraver, and cartographer (died 1806)
- April 6 – Moses Griffith, Welsh draughtsman, engraver and water colourist (died 1819)
- April 11 – Adélaïde Labille-Guiard, French portrait painter (died 1803)
- July 26 – John Warwick Smith, British watercolour landscape painter and illustrator (died 1831)
- August 28 – Johann Wolfgang von Goethe, German poet, novelist, dramatist, theorist, painter (died 1832)
- October – Archibald Skirving, Scottish portrait painter (died 1819)
- October 27 – Joseph Strutt, engraver and antiquary (died 1802)
- November 8 – Anne Seymour Damer, English sculptor (died 1828)
- November 23 – Franz Kobell, German painter, etcher and draftsman (died 1822)
- November 29 – Johan Frederik Clemens, Danish etcher and printmaker (died 1831)
- date unknown
  - George Beck, American painter and poet (died 1812)
  - Paolo Borroni, Italian painter of the Neoclassical style (died 1819)
  - Thomas Burke, Irish engraver and painter (died 1815)
  - Thomas Daniell, English landscape painter (died 1840)
  - Charles Nicolas Favart, French actor, playwright, and painter (died 1806)
  - James Peale, American painter, best known for his miniature and still-life paintings, and a younger brother of noted painter Charles Willson Peale (died 1831)
  - Edward Smyth, Irish sculptor (died 1812)
  - Johann Ziegler, Austrian painter of landscapes and city scenes (died 1812)

== Deaths ==
- January 8 – Donato Creti, Italian painter of the Rococo period, active mostly in Bologna (born 1671)
- February – Peter Monamy, English marine painter (born 1681)
- February 8 – Jan van Huysum, Dutch painter (born 1682)
- March 12 – Alessandro Magnasco, Italian Rococo painter of genre or landscape scenes (born 1667)
- April 14 – Balthasar Denner, German portrait painter (born 1685)
- May 28 – Pierre Subleyras, French painter, active during the late-Baroque and early-Neoclassic period (born 1699)
- December 11 – Bernardino Ludovisi, Italian sculptor (born 1693)
- December 24 – Michelangelo Cerruti, Italian fresco artist (born 1663)
- date unknown
  - Maria Oriana Galli-Bibiena, Italian painter (born 1656)
  - Gao Fenghan, Chinese painter (born 1683)
  - Aureliano Milani, Italian painter and teacher in Bologna (born 1675)
- probable
  - Vincenzo Damini, Italian portrait and fresco painter (born unknown)
