= Filhol =

Filhol is a surname. Notable people with the surname include:

- Alain Filhol (born 1951), French racing driver
- Antoine Michel Filhol (1759–1812), French engraver
- Édouard Filhol (1814–1883), French scientist
- Élisabeth Filhol (born 1965), French writer
- Henri Filhol (1843–1902), French medical doctor
- Jean-Gilles Filhol de Camas (1758–1805), French Navy officer

== See also ==
- Jean-Baptiste Filhiol, a Frenchman, called Don Juan Filhiol by the Spanish
