= Christian Gullager =

Danish-American painter

- Born: Amandus Christian Gullager; March 1, 1759; Copenhagen, Denmark
- Died: November 12, 1826 (aged 67); Philadelphia
- Education: Royal Danish Academy of Fine Arts
- Spouse: Mary Sellman (m. 1786; div. 1809)

Christian Gullager (March 1, 1759 – November 12, 1826) was a Danish-American artist specializing in portraits and theatrical scenery in the late 18th century. He worked in Boston, Massachusetts, New York, and Philadelphia.

== Biography ==
Amandus Christian Gullager was born to Christian Guldager Prang and Marie Elisabeth Dalberg in Copenhagen. He trained at the Royal Danish Academy of Fine Arts where he was awarded a silver medal in 1780. Gullager moved to Boston by 1786. In 1792, Gullager established a drawing academy at his house on Tremont Hill in Boston. Gullager worked in Newburyport in 1786, in Boston from 1789 to 1797, in New York City from 1797 to 1798, in Philadelphia 1798–1805, and in New York again in 1806–07. He died during 1826 in Philadelphia and was buried at the Second Presbyterian Church Yard, Third and Arch Streets.

== Selected works ==
In America, portrait subjects included president George Washington. He designed scenery for Boston's Federal Street Theatre.

Gullager created portraits of:

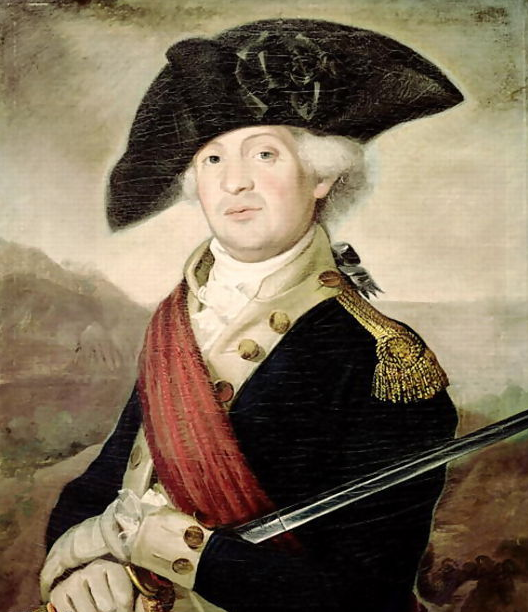
Portrait of John May, 1789 (American Antiquarian Society)

- Joseph Ball
- Captain Offin Boardman, about 1787
- Benjamin Greenleaf Boardman, about 1787
- Sarah Greenleaf Boardman (Mrs. Offin Boardman) ca.1787
- Reverend Eli Forbes
- John May (1748–1812), 1789
- David Plumer
- Mary Sargent Plumer (Mrs. David Plumer)
- Elizabeth Sewall Salisbury (Mrs. Samuel Salisbury), 1789
- Martha Saunders Salisbury (Mrs. Nicholas Salisbury), 1789
- Stephen Salisbury, 1789
- Daniel Waldo (1724–1808), 1789
- Rebecca Salisbury Waldo (Mrs. Daniel Waldo), 1789
- George Washington, 1789
- Abigail Leonard West (1796–1879), c. 1796
- David West, Jr. (1790–1825), c. 1796
- David West, Sr. (1765–1810), c. 1796
- Jeremiah Williams, ca.1780
- Mathilda Davis Williams, ca.1791

== Image gallery ==
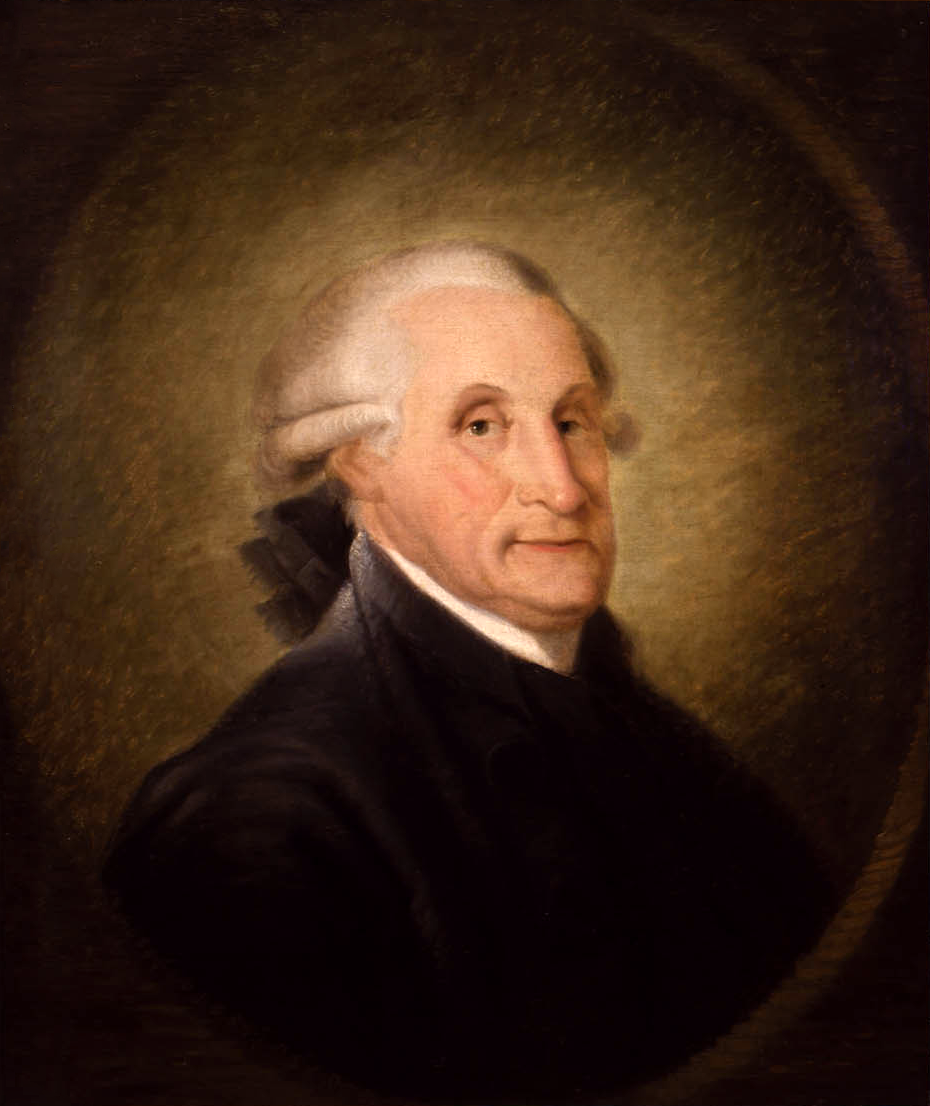
George Washington, 1789

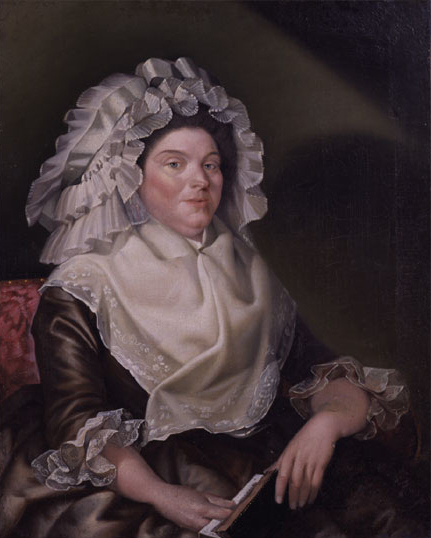
Elizabeth Sewall Salisbury (Mrs. Samuel Salisbury), 1789 (Worcester Art Museum)

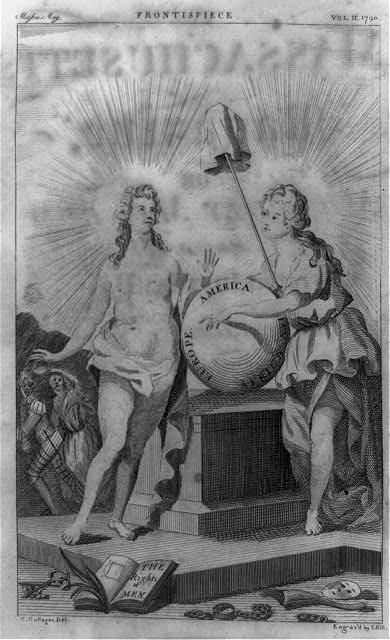
Design by Gullager for the Massachusetts Magazine; engraving by Samuel Hill, ca.1790

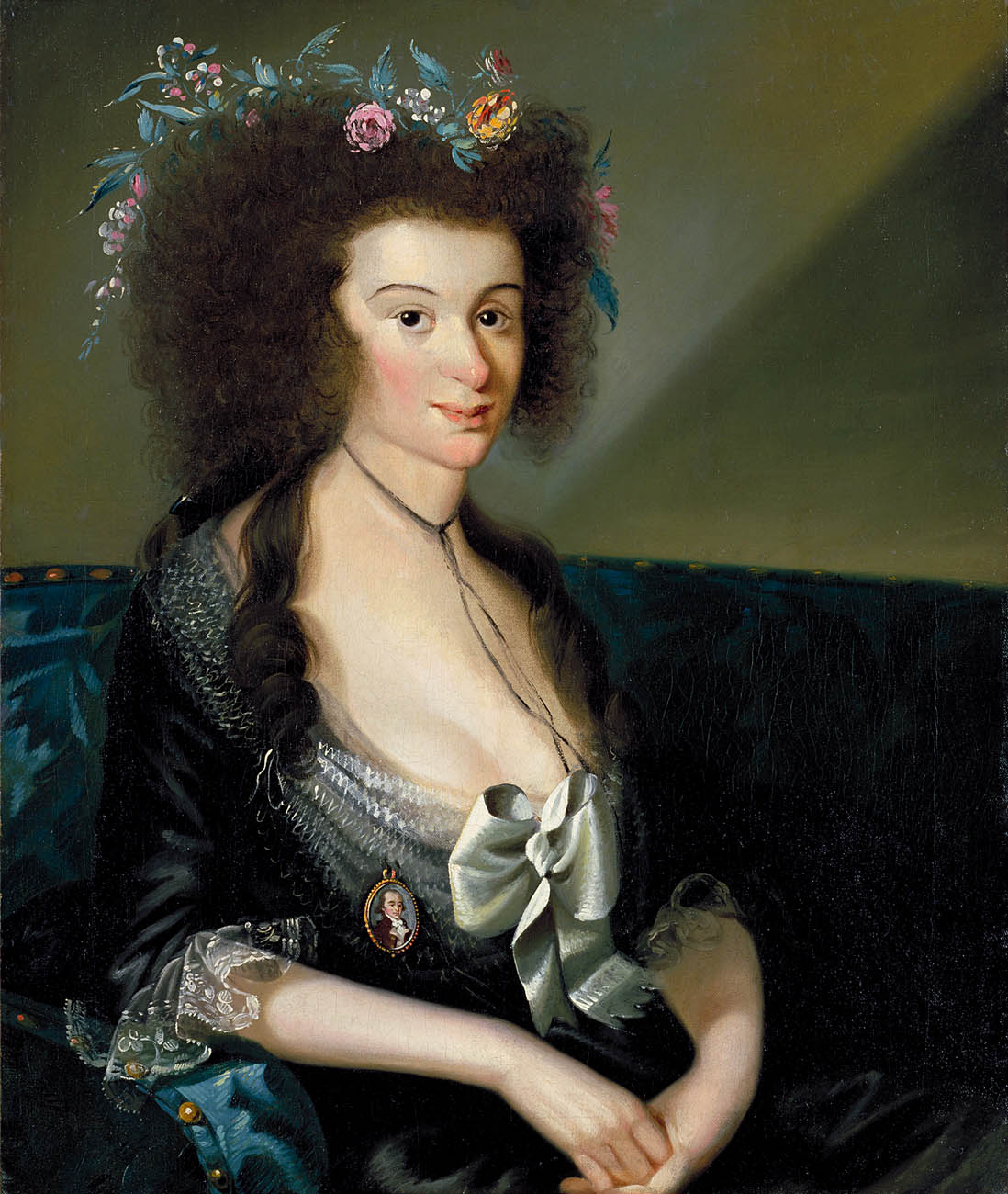
Mathilda Davis Williams, ca.1791 (Smithsonian)

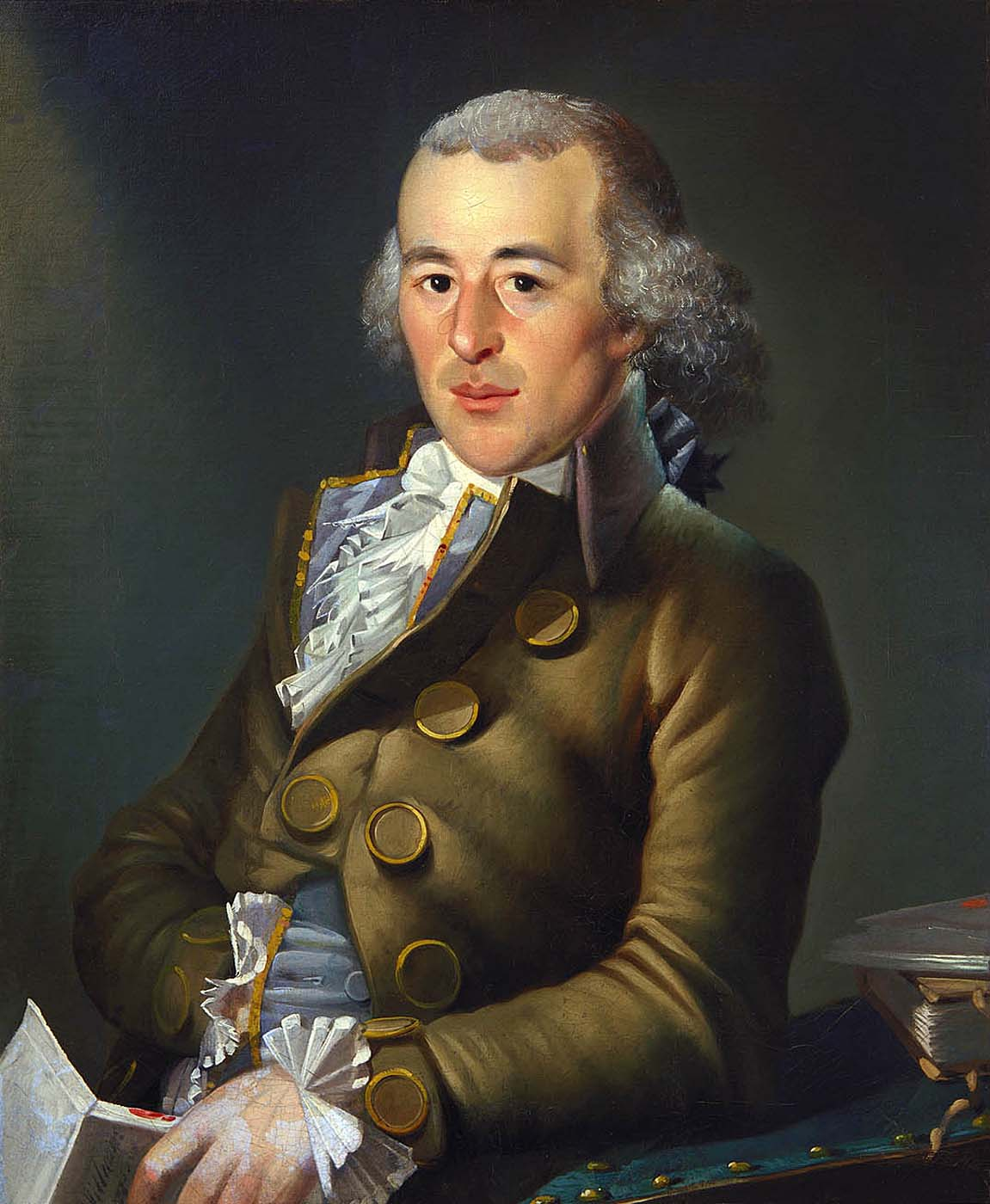
Jeremiah Williams c. 1780

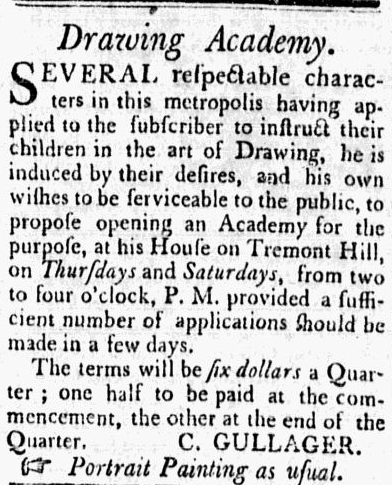
Advertisement for Gullager's "drawing academy," "at his house on Tremont Hill," Boston, 1792
