= Giorgio Berti =

Italian painter (1794–1863)

Giorgio Berti (1794–1863) was an Italian painter, active in Neoclassic style.

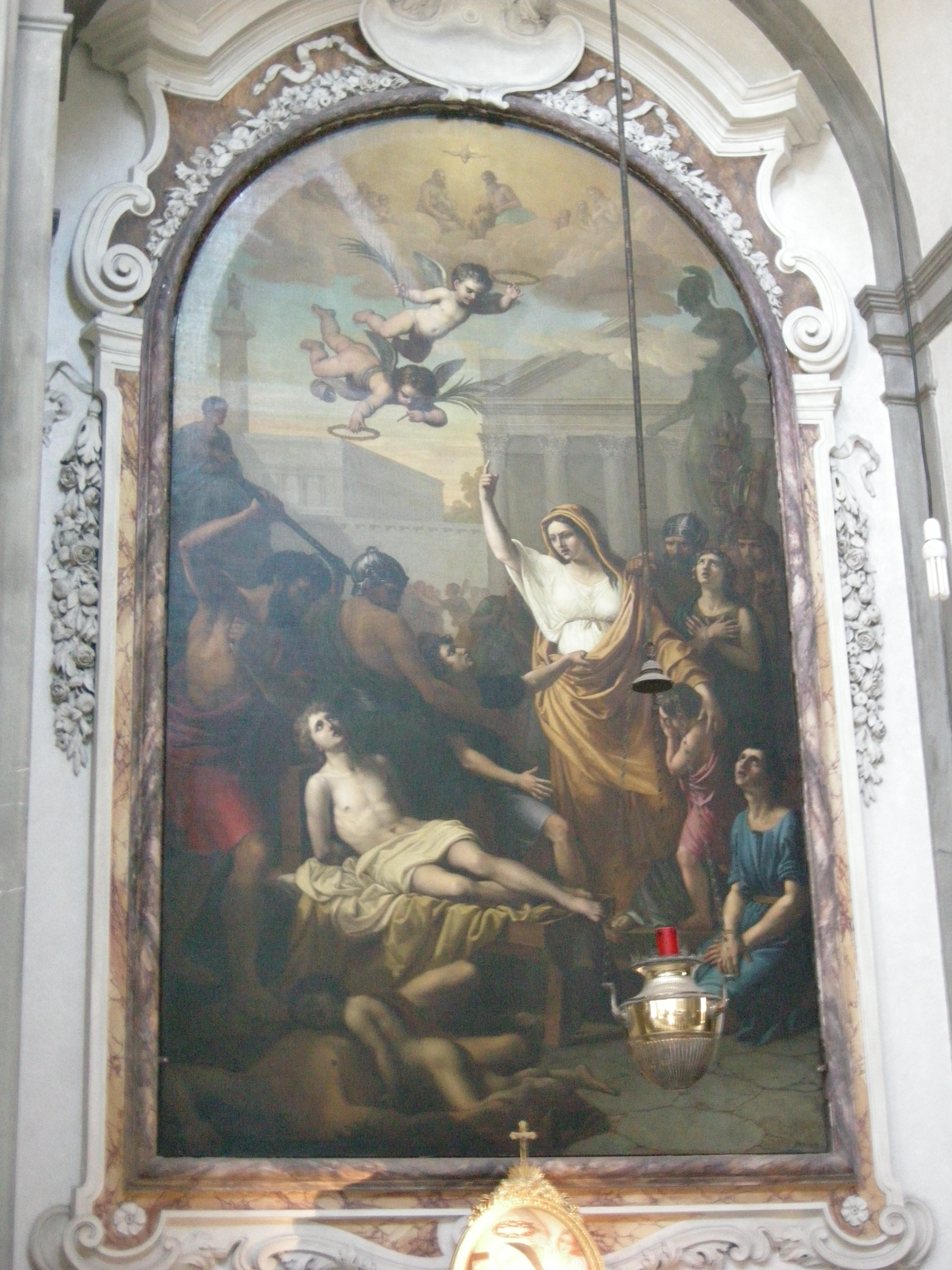
St Felicita witnesses the Martyrdom of her seven sons

== Biography ==
He was born in Florence, and there a pupil at the Academy of Fine Arts under Benvenuti. Among his works were a painting of Herminia reveals her Beauty to the Shepherds (1821) from an episode of Jerusalem Delivered; painting of Ste Felicita witnesses the Martyrdom of her seven sons (after 1824) for church of Santa Felicita, and a Charity of San Camillo de Lellis for Santa Maria Maggiore.
