= Michelangelo Maestri =

Italian painter

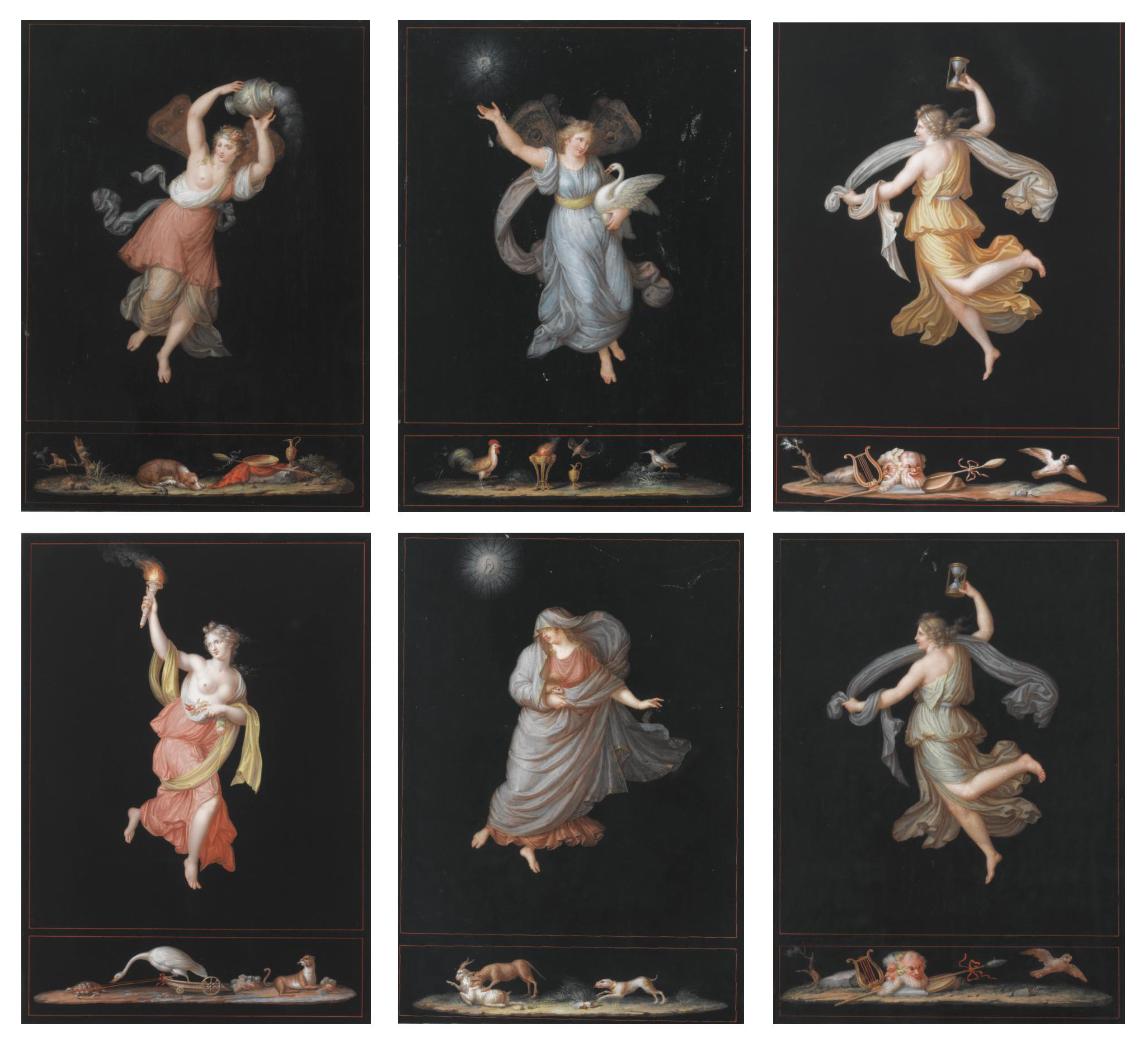
Michelangelo Maestri, after Raffaello Sanzio, called Raphael, A group of six allegorical female figures, five hours of the night, one hour of the day, set of 6, gouache on paper, each approx. 42 x 31 cm

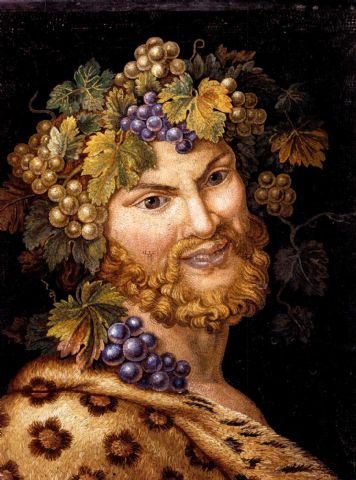
Bacchus, by Michelangelo Maestri

Michelangelo Maestri was an Italian artist of the 18th century who died in Rome in 1812. His finest compositions are based on motifs from antique frescos discovered in Pompeii and Herculaneum and from designs by Raphael or his pupil Giulio Romano. His work became very popular and often purchased by European travelers during their Grand Tour.

Some of his most famous gouaches portray Cupid in the form of a putto in a chariot being drawn by various animals. These were inspired by ceiling frescoes in the salone of Villa Lante, on the Janiculum Hill in Rome. Francesco Piranesi and Tommaso Piroli published these frescoes in a series of engravings in 1805 and attributed each drawing to Giulio Romano. Maestri probably knew the engravings as his inscriptions beneath the framing lines (describing the different types of love) are similar to those reported by Piranesi and Piroli.
