= Portrait of Marie Louise (Gérard) =

Painting by François Gérard

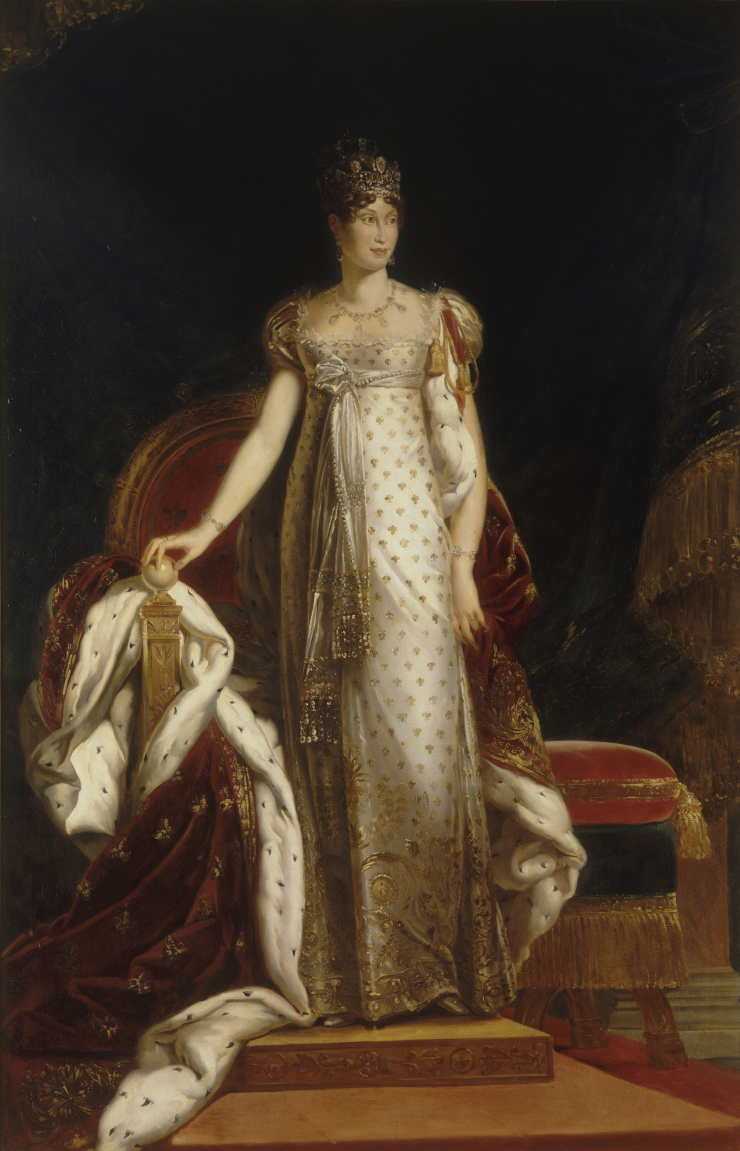
- Artist: François Gérard
- Year: 1812
- Type: Oil on canvas, portrait painting
- Dimensions: 240.5 cm × 155.5 cm (94.7 in × 61.2 in)
- Location: Imperial Treasury; Vienna

Portrait of Marie Louise is an 1812 portrait painting by François Gérard. It depicts Marie Louise, the Empress of France. A member of the House of Habsburg and daughter of Francis I of Austria, she became Napoleon's second wife in 1810. The following year she gave birth to a son Napoleon II. After the defeat of her husband she was made sovereign ruler of the Duchy of Parma. She is shown at full-length in ceremonial robes.

The work was exhibited at the Salon of 1812 at the Louvre in Paris. Gerard was a celebrated portraitist during the Napoleonic era, and his career continued to flourish following the Restoration of the Monarchy in 1815. He painted many members of the Bonaparte dynasty.

The original painting is now in Vienna, Marie Louise's home city. Several versions exist of the painting, as the image was widely replicated across Europe during the Napoleonic era. A notable copy is now in Fontainebleau Palace. A replica produced by Jean-Baptiste Paulin Guérin is in the Museum of French History at the Palace of Versailles.

An earlier 1810 head and shoulders portrait of Marie Louise is now in the Louvre in Paris.

== See also ==
- Portrait of Marie Louise (Borghesi), an 1839 portrait painting by the Italian artist Giovanni Battista Borghesi

== Bibliography ==
- Palmer, Alan. Napoleon & Marie Louise: The Emperor's Second Wife. ISBN 0312280084. Constable, 2001.
