= Teignmouth (painting) =

Painting by J.M.W. Turner

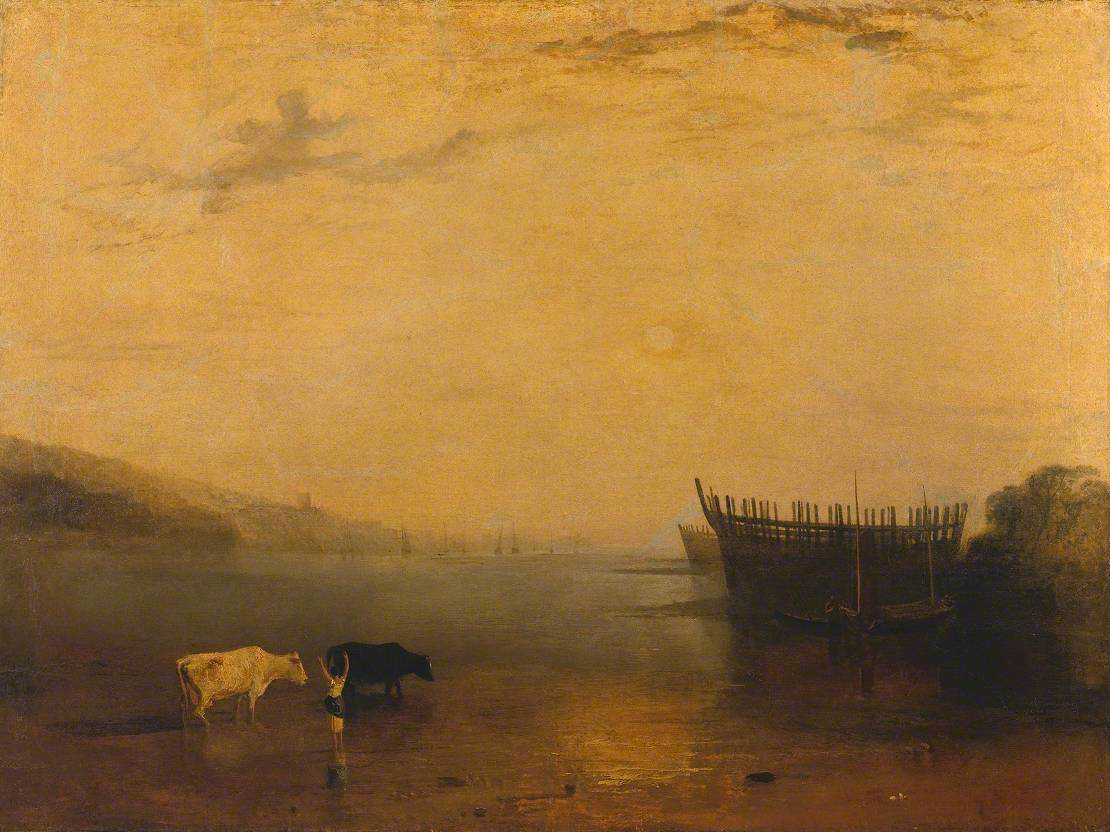
- Artist: Joseph Mallord William Turner
- Year: 1812
- Type: Oil on canvas, landscape painting
- Dimensions: 130 cm × 161 cm (51 in × 63 in)
- Location: Petworth House; Sussex

Teignmouth is an 1812 landscape painting by the British artist J. M. W. Turner. It depicts a view at Teignmouth, a port town in the south of Devon. It was based on sketches Turner had produced during a visit to the county in 1811. It looks southwards along the River Teign. In the foreground a young woman is shown with some cows. A ruined abbey can be seen, and in the very far distance is Teignmouth itself.

The painting was shown in an exhibition at Turner's own studio in Queen Anne Street in London, one of six scenes featuring Devon and Cornwall that he displayed. It was acquired by the art collector George Wyndham, 3rd Earl of Egremont. It remains in Egremont's former residence Petworth House in Sussex, although ownership was transferred to the Tate Britain.

== See also ==
- List of paintings by J. M. W. Turner

== Bibliography ==
- Ackroyd, Peter. J.M.W. Turner. Vintage, 2006.
- Hamilton, James. Turner - A Life. Sceptre, 1998.
- Peckham, Morse. The Birth of Romanticism, 1790-1815. Penkevill, 1986.
- Rowell, Christopher, Warrell, Ian & Brown, David Blayney. Turner at Petworth. Harry N. Abrams, 2002
