= Flatford Mill from the Lock =

Painting by John Constable

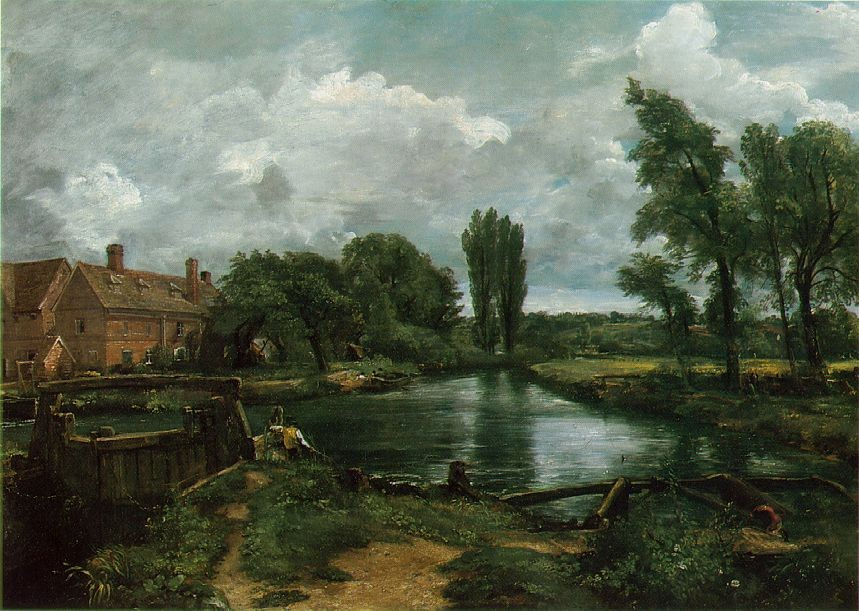
- Artist: John Constable
- Year: 1812
- Type: Oil on canvas, landscape painting
- Dimensions: 66 cm × 92,7 cm (26 in × 365 in)
- Location: Private collection

Flatford Mill from the Lock is an 1812 landscape painting by the British artist John Constable. It depicts a view of Flatford Mill on the River Stour on the border between Suffolk and Essex, part of what is now known as Constable Country. The painting was displayed at the Royal Academy's Summer Exhibition of 1812 at Somerset House in London. It was praised by the President of the Royal Academy Benjamin West, at a time when Constable was still a struggling artist. While the finished work is now in a private collection, a preparatory oil sketch in the possession of the Royal Academy.

== See also ==
- List of paintings by John Constable

== Bibliography ==
- Bailey, Anthony. John Constable: A Kingdom of his Own. Random House, 2012.
- Noon, Patrick & Bann, Stephen. Constable to Delacroix: British Art and the French Romantics. Tate, 2003.
- Reynolds, Graham. Constable's England. Metropolitan Museum of Art, 1983..
