= Cupid and Psyche (Capitoline Museums) =

Roman copy of a late Hellenistic statue

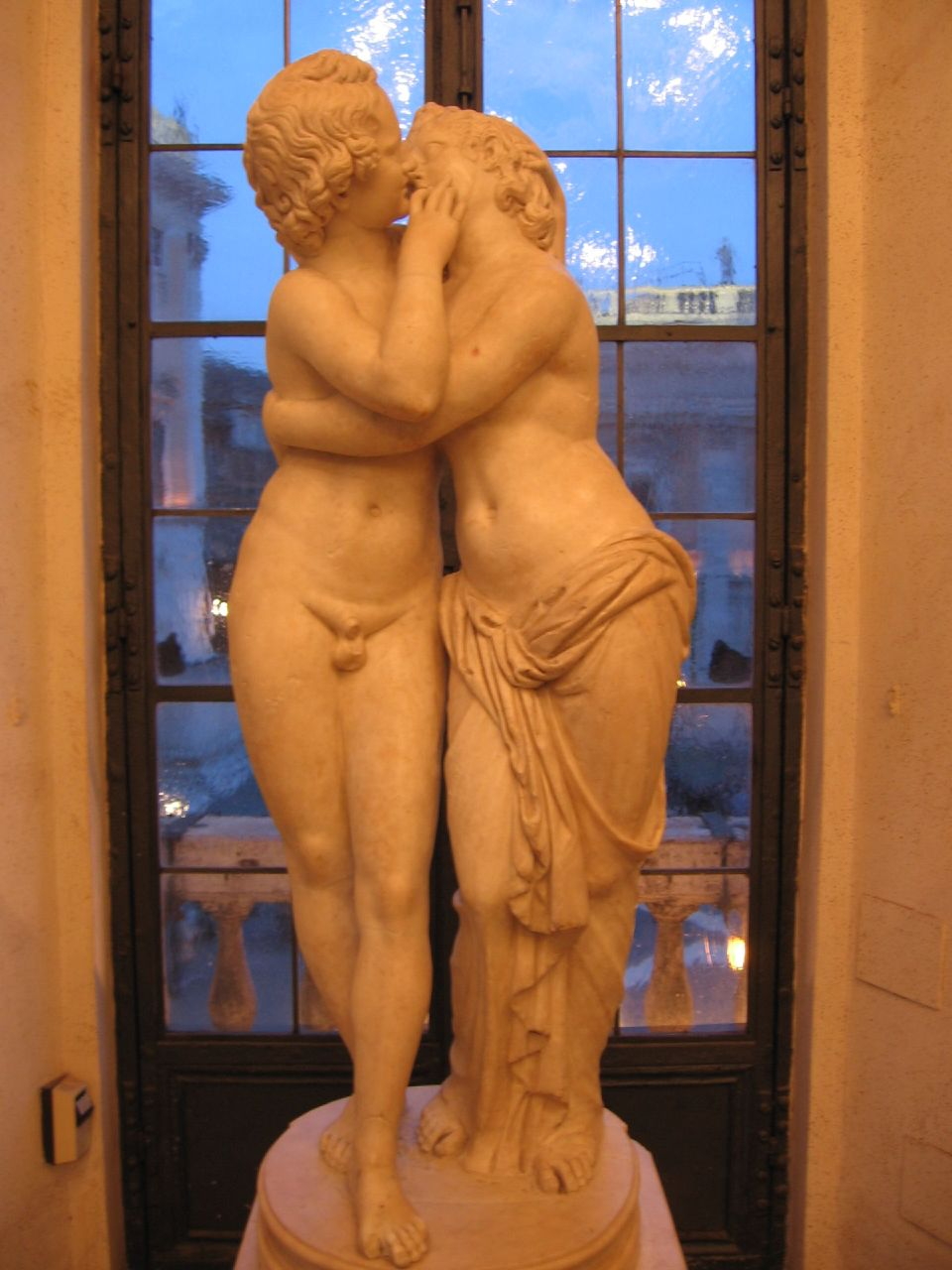
Cupid and Psyche, Roman marble sculpture after a Hellenistic original, h. 1.25 m (4 ft 1 in) (Capitoline Museums)

The marble Cupid and Psyche conserved in the Capitoline Museums, Rome, is a 1st or 2nd century Roman copy of a late Hellenistic period original. It was given to the nascent Capitoline Museums by Pope Benedict XIV in 1749, shortly after its discovery. Its graceful balance and sentimental appearance made it a favourite among the neoclassical generations of artists and visitors, and it was copied in many materials from bronze to biscuit porcelain. Antonio Canova consciously set out to outdo the Antique original with his own Cupid and Psyche of 1808 (illustration, below left)

The sculpture was discovered in the garden of the vigna of the canonico Panicale on the Aventine Hill in February 1749.

The sculpture quite eclipsed a Roman marble of a winged Cupid and Psyche that had been discovered in the 17th century and removed to the Medici collection in Florence. The Capitoline Cupid and Psyche was among the cream of the Roman collections sequestered by the French under the terms of the treaty of Tolentino (1797) and transferred to Paris amid grand theatrics. It was returned to Rome after the fall of Napoleon.

Not all viewers were satisfied by its mediocre execution, and Francis Haskell and Nicholas Penny noted that Jean-Baptiste de Saint-Victor thought it was a reflection of some earlier, better work, and that, earlier, Joseph-Jerome Le Français de Lalande hoped in print that it might inspire some modern sculptor to come up with a superior work on the same subject. Antonio Canova took up the challenge quite consciously, in his Cupid and Psyche of 1808.

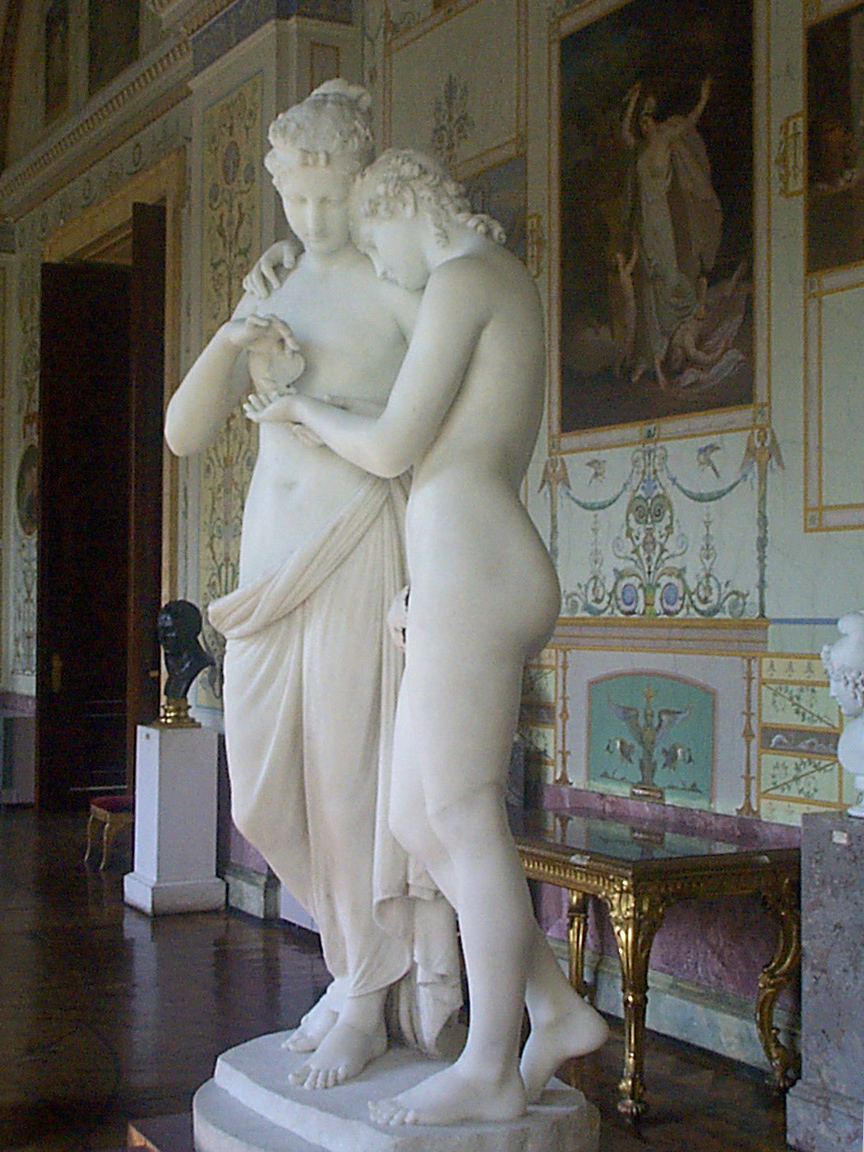
Cupid and Psyche by Antonio Canova, 1808 (Hermitage Museum, St Petersburg)

Another version of the Cupid and Psyche was discovered by conte Giuseppe Fede in his early excavations at Hadrian's Villa, Tivoli. It has disappeared now, but it was drawn, in its completed and restored condition, by Pompeo Batoni, who was assembling a "paper museum" of antiquities in 1727–30 for the English antiquary Richard Topham. As it was restored, Cupid turns his head away coyly.
