= Samuel Hill (engraver) =

American engraver

Samuel Hill (c. 1765 – c. 1809) was an engraver who worked in Boston, Massachusetts, in the late 18th and early 19th centuries. His engravings were published in the Massachusetts Magazine; Defoe's New Robinson Crusoe (1790); Lavater's Essays on Physiognomy (1794); American Universal Geography (1796); Cook's Three Voyages to the Pacific Ocean (1797). Hill's subjects extended from maps to literary illustrations to landscapes; portrait subjects included James Bowdoin, Rev. John Murray of Newburyport, Massachusetts, and Elizabeth White (d. 1798). Examples of Hill's work can be found in the American Antiquarian Society, Massachusetts Historical Society, and Museum of Fine Arts, Boston.

Scholars continue debating the precise dates of Hill's birth and death. Suggested candidates for Hill's lifespan: born July 27, 1750, "probably the son of Alexander and Thankful Hill"; 1765–1809; and 1766?–1804.
