= The Oath of the Saxons =

Painting by Pietro Benvenuti

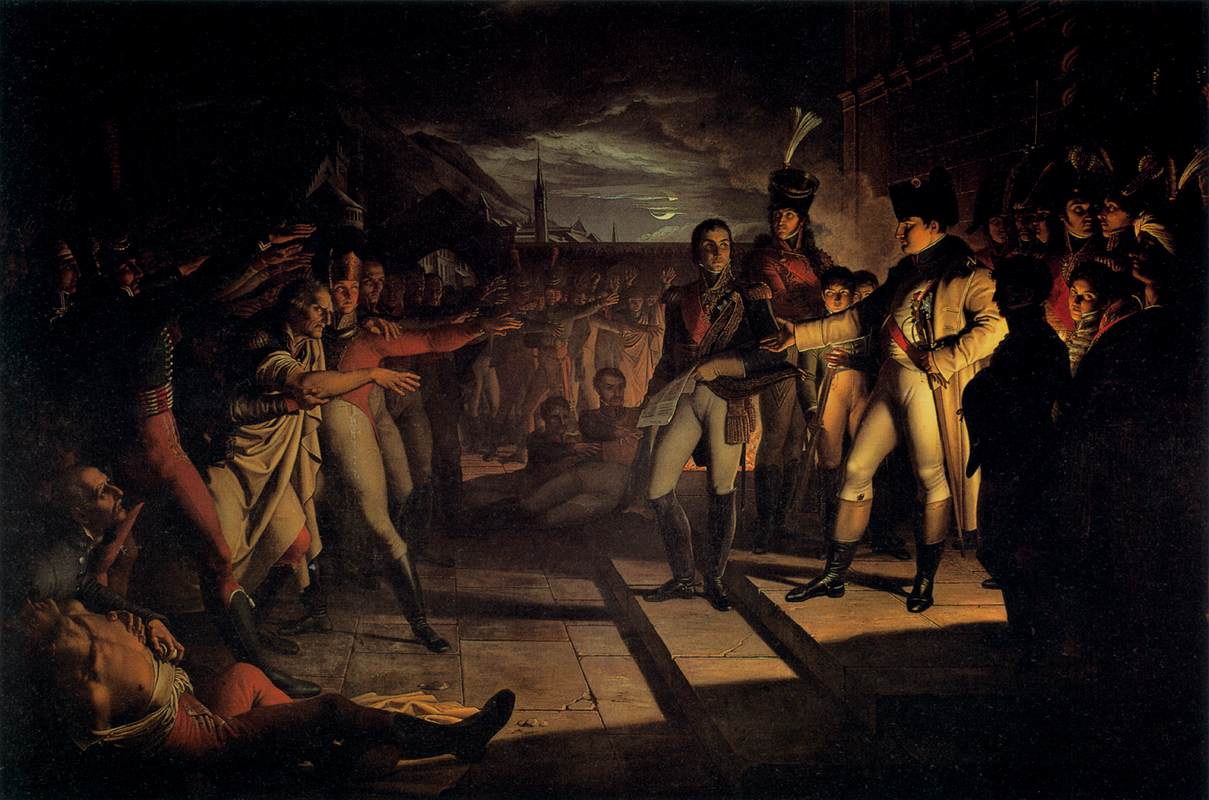
- Artist: Pietro Benvenuti
- Year: 1812
- Type: Oil on canvas, history painting
- Dimensions: 380 cm × 480 cm (150 in × 190 in)
- Location: Palazzo Pitti; Florence

The Oath of the Saxons is an 1812 history painting by the Italian artist Pietro Benvenuti. It depicts a scene from 1806 the Napoleonic Wars. Prior to the Battle of Jena in October 1806 in an attempt to separate Saxony from its Prussian ally, French Emperor Napoleon issued a proclamation to the Saxon people. Following his triumph at the battle he offered a second address to the officers of the Saxon Army taking prisoner at Jena. He offered that if they pledged never to take up arms against him again he would allow them and their troops to return home immedtiately.

The painting was commissioned by Napoleon who had established himself as King of Italy in 1805 and went to some length to cultivate the talent of Benvenuti. The painting shows the influence of the Neoclassical painting Oath of the Horatii by Jacques-Louis David and Girodet's Ossian Receiving the Ghosts of French Heroes. Its lighting effect anticipates Francisco Goya's The Third of May 1808. The work remained in Paris until the final downfall of Napoleon during the Hundred Days campaign of 1815. Today it is in the collection of the Palazzo Pitti in Florence.

== Bibliography ==
- Allegri, Francesca & Tosi, Massimo. Certaldo. Poesia del Medioevo. Federighi Editori, 2002
- Boime, Albert. A Social History of Modern Art, Volume 2: Art in an Age of Bonapartism, 1800-1815. University of Chicago Press, 1993.
- Chiarini, Marco. Pitti Palace: All the Museums, All the Works. Sillabe, 2001.
