= Pietro Benvenuti =

Italian painter

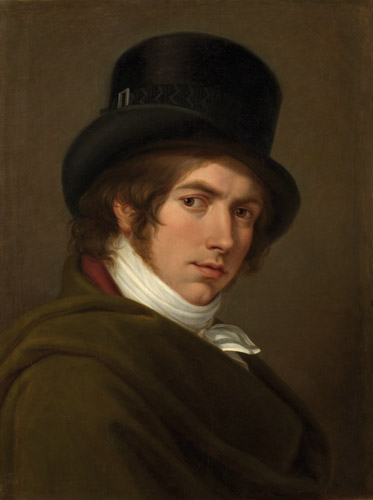
- Self-portrait in a top hat (1802)
- Born: January 8, 1769; Arezzo, Grand Duchy of Tuscany
- Died: 3 February 1844 (aged 75); Florence, Grand Duchy of Tuscany
- Known for: Historical and mythological painting
- Notable work: The Oath of the Saxons
- Movement: Neoclassicism
- Spouse: Vittoria Monti (m. 1804)

Pietro Benvenuti (8 January 1769 – 3 February 1844) was an Italian Neoclassical painter.

== Biography ==
=== Early life and education ===
Born in Arezzo in Tuscany, he was influenced by the style of Jacques-Louis David. He was a student of the Academy of Fine Arts of Florence, then studied in Rome, 1792–1803, where he formed an informal academy with his friend of long standing, Vincenzo Cammuccini, and Luigi Sabatelli.

=== Napoleonic period ===
In 1807 he was recruited to become court painter to Elisa Bonaparte Baciocchi and to direct the Florentine Academy of Fine Arts. In 1809 Napoleon commissioned him his most important work, The Oath of the Saxons (1809–12; Florence, Palazzo Pitti). This painting, for which Benvenuti did more than 19 sheets of drawings (Florence, Uffizi), is rigorously academic and again shows the influence of contemporary French art, notably François Gérard’s Ossian Evoking Phantoms (1801) and Anne-Louis Girodet’s Apotheosis of French Heroes who Died for the Country during the War for Liberty (1800; Château de Malmaison). The use of strong chiaroscuro, however, is more nearly Romantic in inspiration. In 1812 it was delivered to Napoleon in Paris but was brought back to Florence in 1815, together with Old Master paintings that Canova, assisted by Benvenuti, had succeeded in repatriating.

=== Habsburg rule ===
Benvenuti's position as the most important official painter in Florence and one of the leading Neoclassical painters in Italy was reinforced, after the restoration of the Habsburg-Lorraine dynasty, by two fresco commissions from Ferdinand III, Grand Duke of Tuscany: the Labours of Hercules (1817–29; Florence, Palazzo Pitti) and The Old and New Testaments (1827–36; Florence, San Lorenzo, Cappella dei Principi). In both works his style is much softer than in his easel paintings. In another grand-ducal commission, Christ Blessing the Little Children (1838; Florence, Palazzo Pitti), he employs the forms and spirituality derived from Raphael that are found in the religious paintings of the Puristi. Benvenuti died at Florence, while holding the post of Director. On his death his pupil, the Romantic painter Giuseppe Bezzuoli, became Director of the Accademia.

Benvenuti had many pupils and students, including Gaspero Martellini, Tommaso Gazzarrini, Niccola Cianfanelli, Luigi Mussini, and Giorgio Berti. He was an associate of the Accademia di Brera, Milan. In 1829, he was elected into the National Academy of Design as an Honorary member.

=== Critical assessment ===
Benvenuti’s approach to history painting was laborious, even by academic standards, as noted by the young painter Francesco Hayez when he visited his studio. His strict adherence to Neoclassical canons of beauty, based on close study of antique models, is particularly evident in the Death of Priam (1806–12; Florence, Galleria Corsini). Apart from the Death of Ugolino (1813; Florence, Palazzo della Gherardesca), Benvenuti hardly responded to the burgeoning taste for medieval subjects that heralded the Romantic Movement.

== Gallery ==
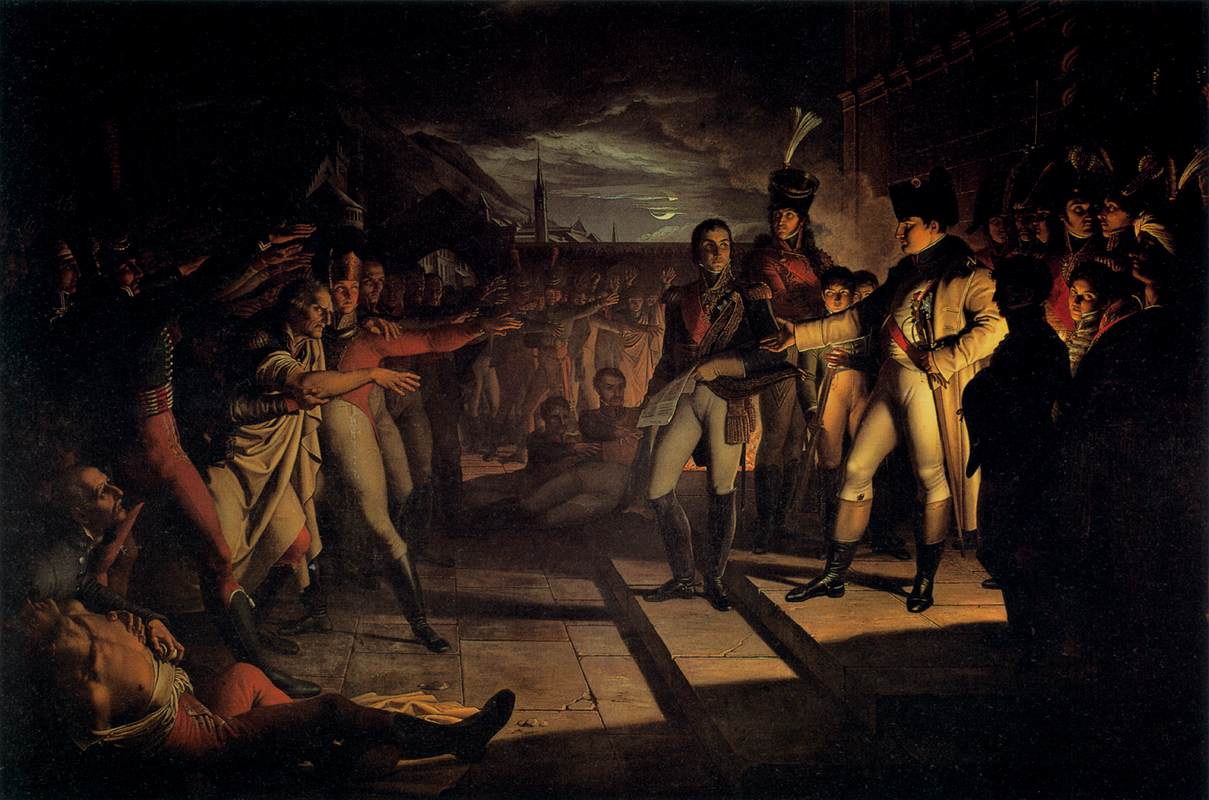
The Oath of the Saxons, 1812

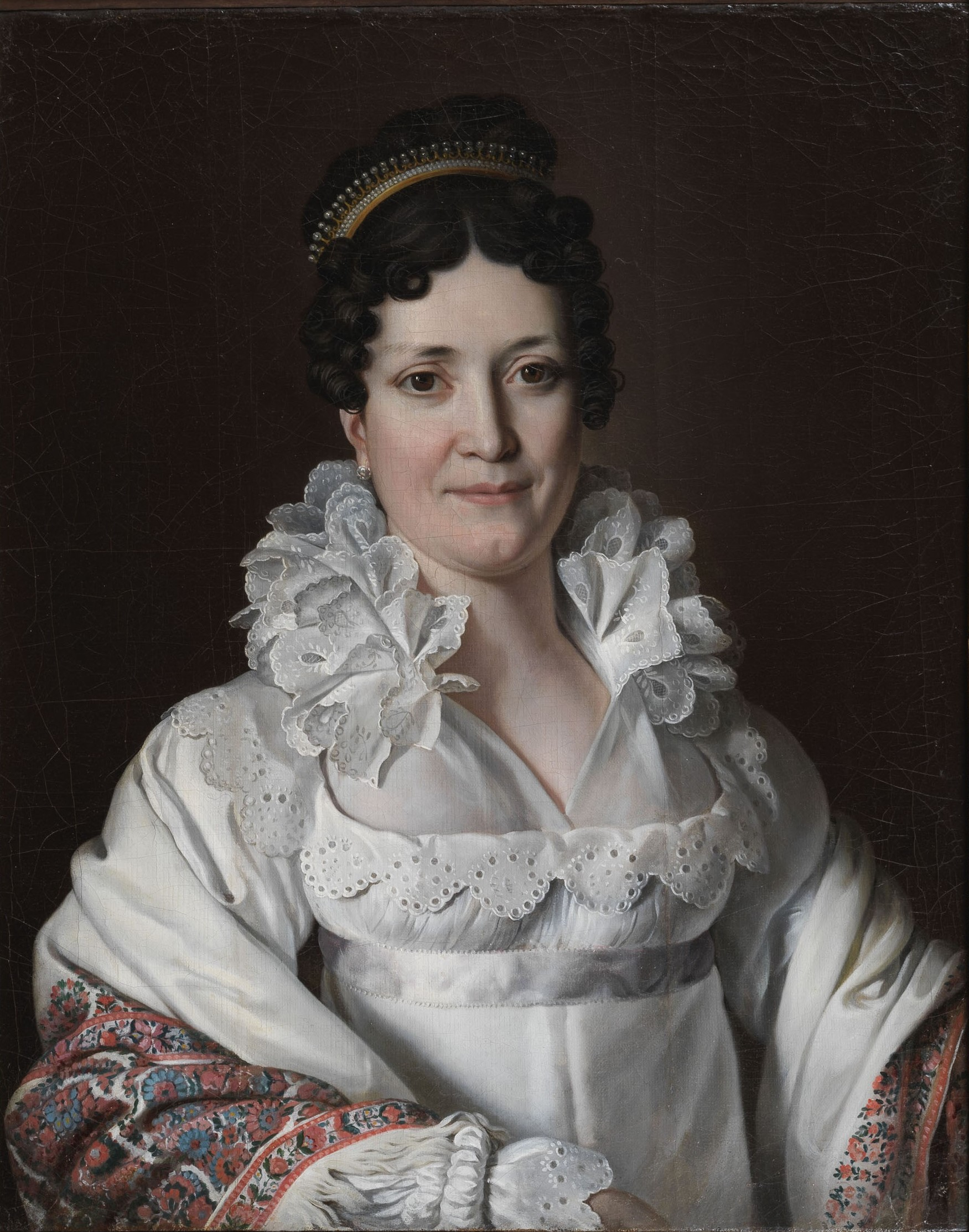
Elisa Bonaparte, 1814

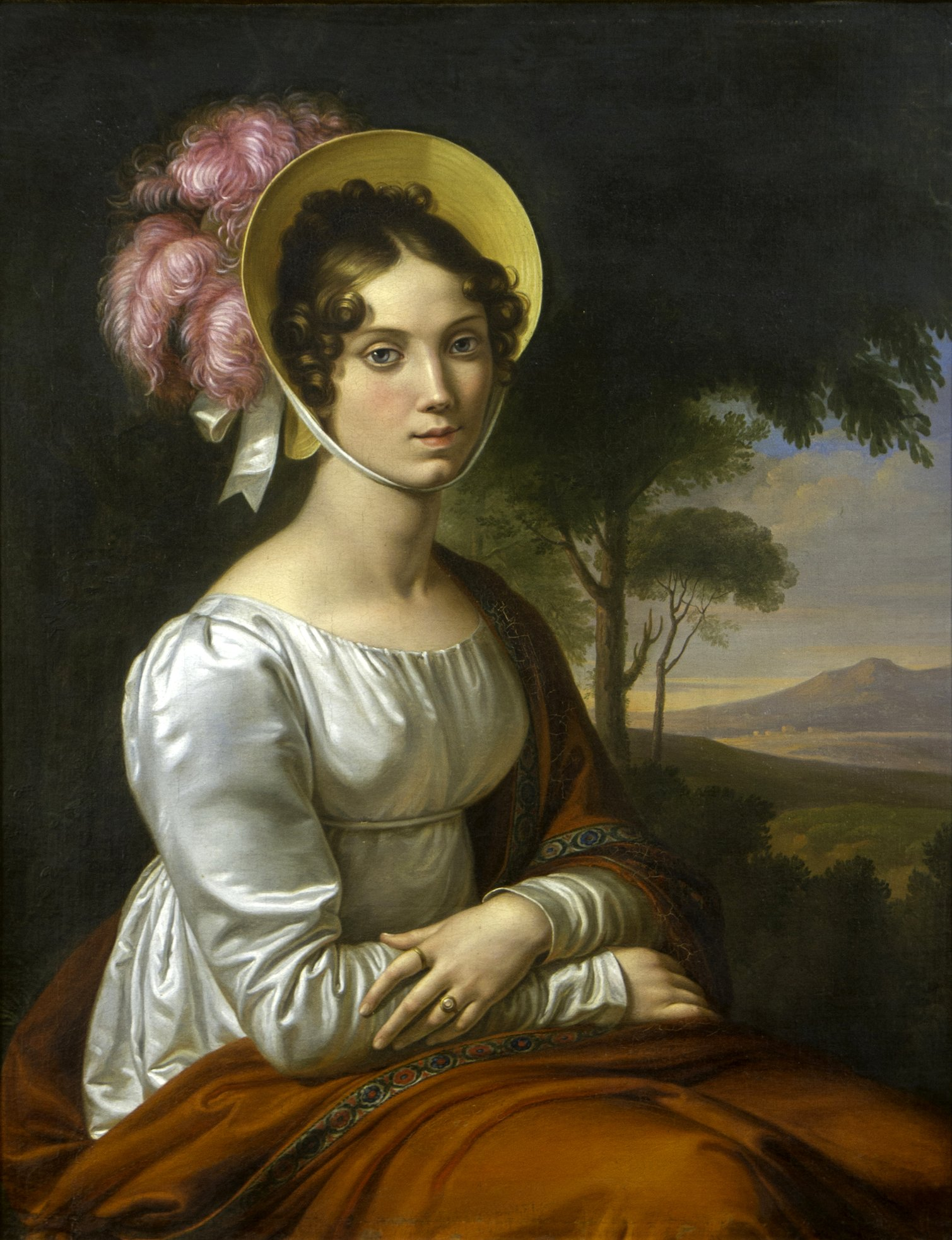
Princess Zinaida Alexandrovna Volkonskaia, 1815

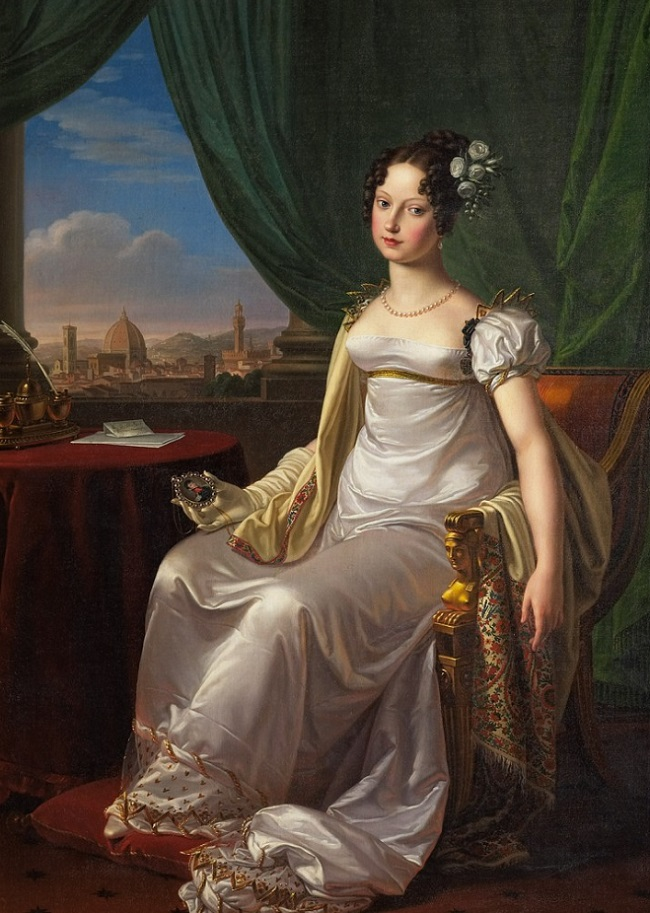
Maria Teresa of Austria and Tuscany, 1817

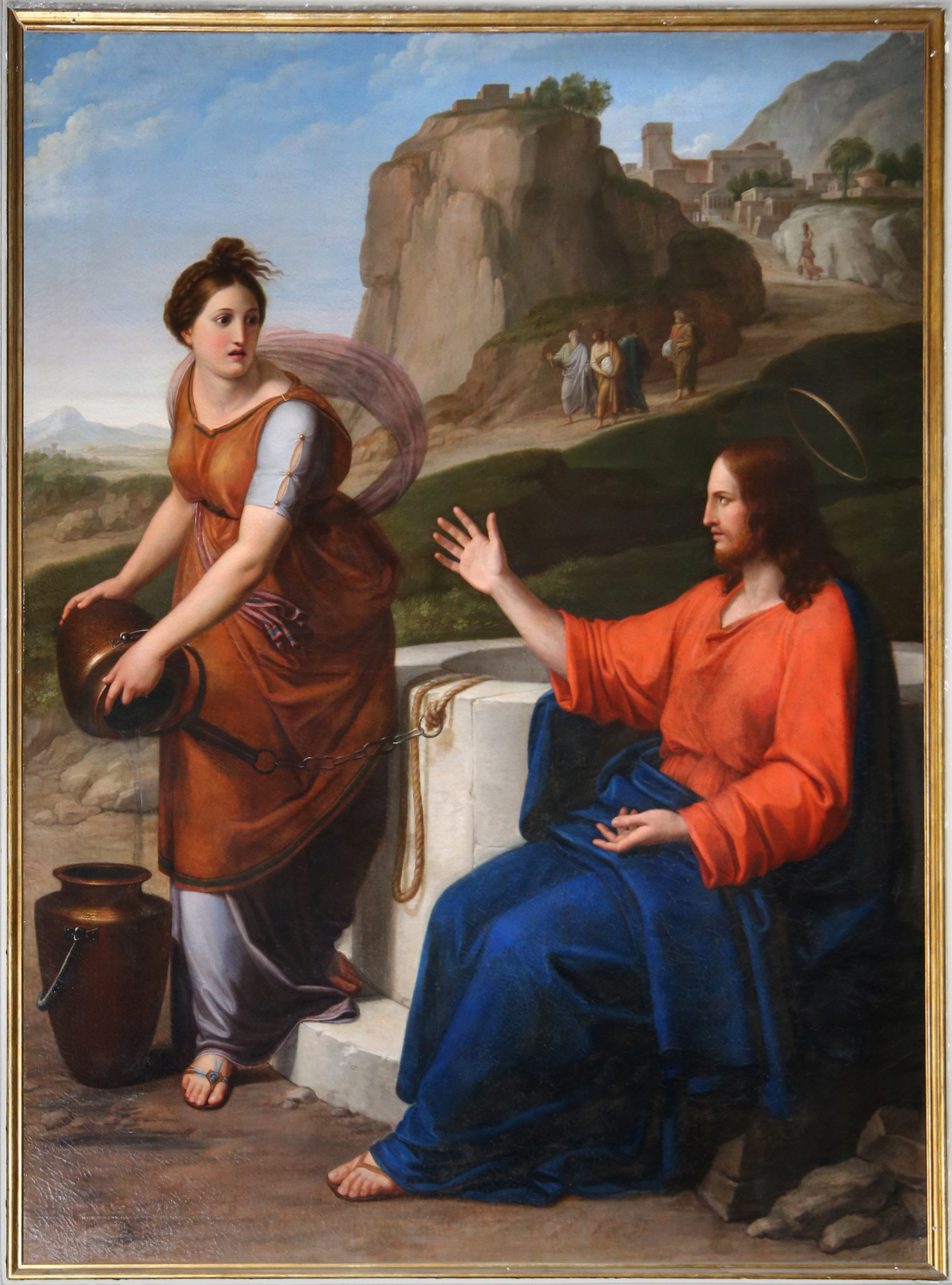
Christ and the Samaritan, c. 1807

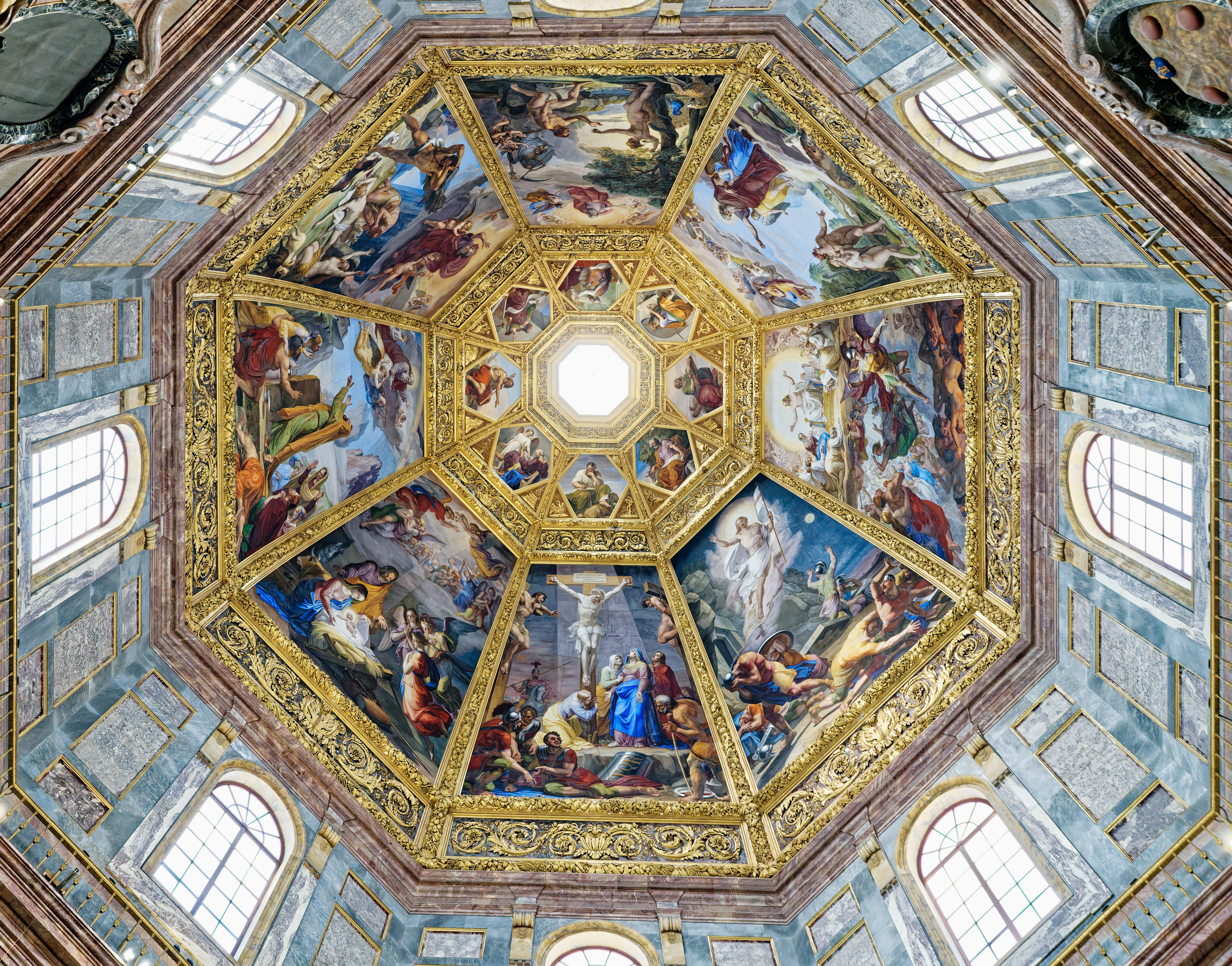
Dome interior of the Cappella dei Principi, Florence

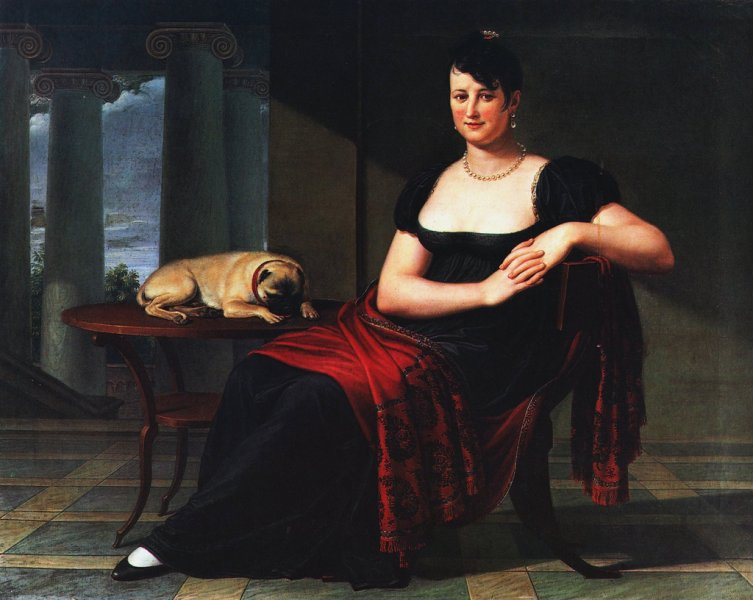
Portrait of Elena Mastiani Brunacci, 1809

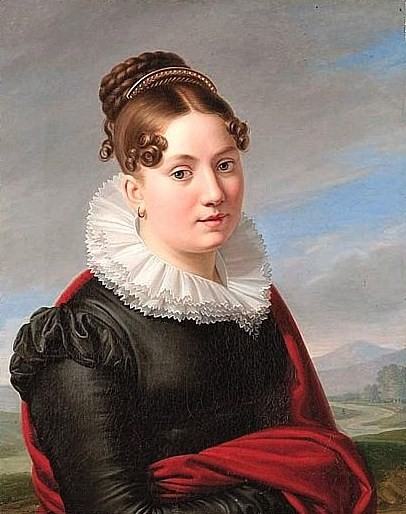
Portrait of Eleonora Pandolfini Nencini, 1810

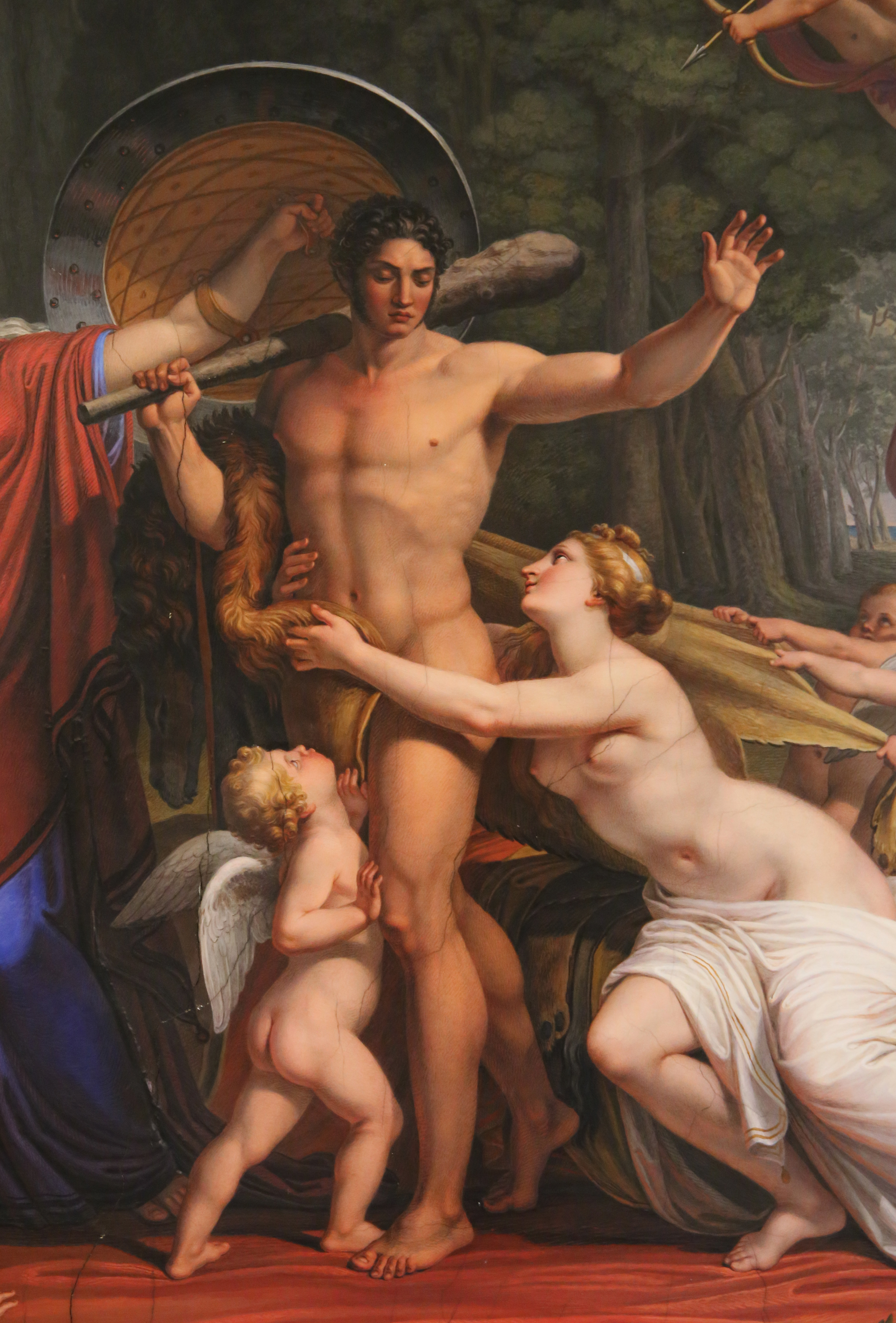
Hercules at the crossroads (Detail), 1828
