= Self-Portrait (Gainsborough) =

1759 painting by Thomas Gainsborough

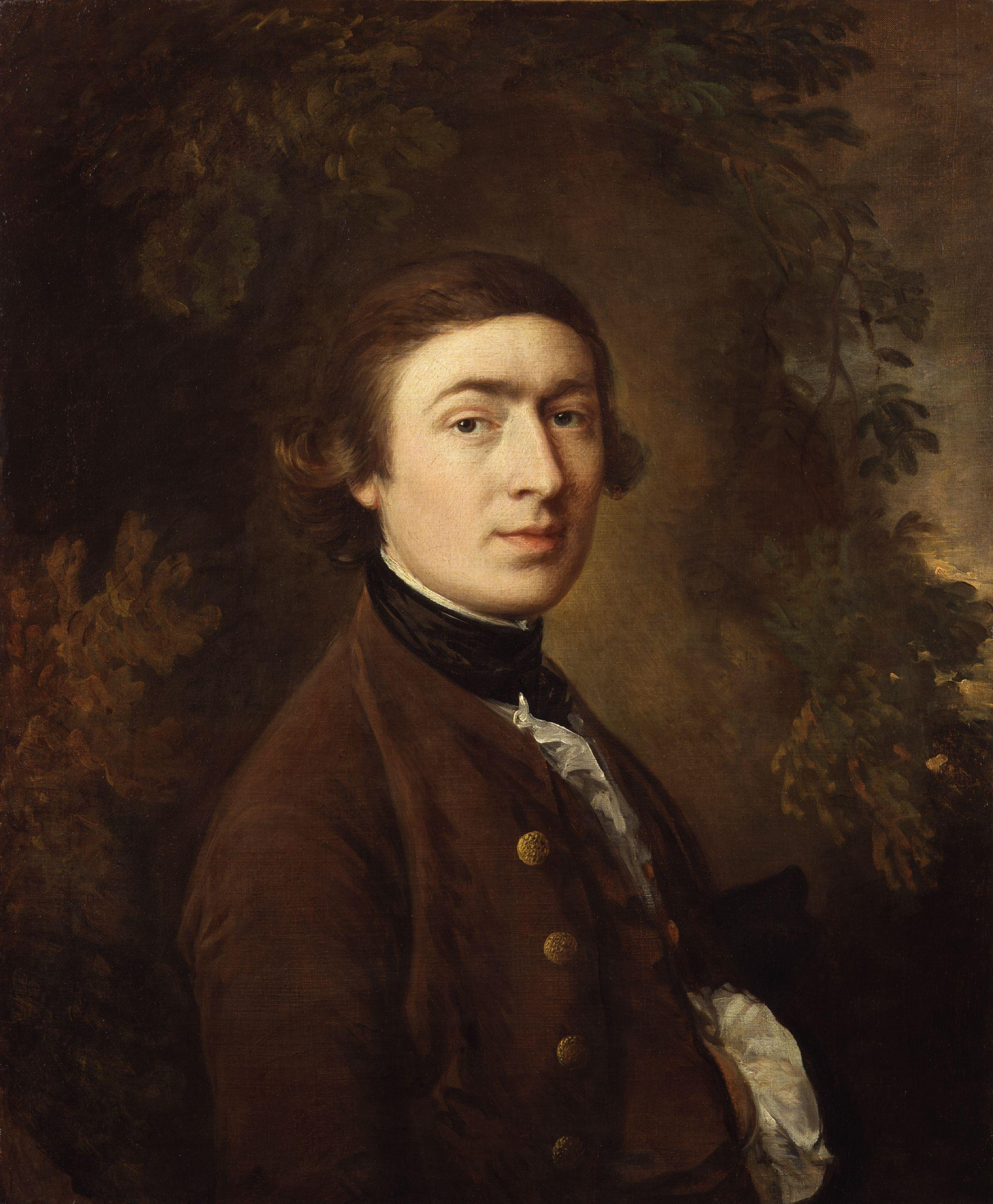
- Artist: Thomas Gainsborough
- Year: 1759
- Type: Oil on canvas, portrait painting
- Dimensions: 76.2 cm × 63.5 cm (30.0 in × 25.0 in)
- Location: National Portrait Gallery; London

Self-Portrait is a 1759 oil on canvas portrait painting by the English artist Thomas Gainsborough. A self-portrait. It features the artist in his early thirties. It was painted in Ipswich in his native Suffolk the same year he moved to the fashionable spa town of Bath in Somerset and established a successful practice in Society portraits.

Today the painting is in the collection of the National Portrait Gallery in London, having been acquired in 1965 through acceptance in lieu.

== Bibliography ==
- Hamilton, James. Gainsborough: A Portrait. Hachette UK, 2017.
- Ingamells, John. National Portrait Gallery Mid-Georgian Portraits, 1760–1790. National Portrait Gallery, 2004.
