= Johann Ziegler =

German painter

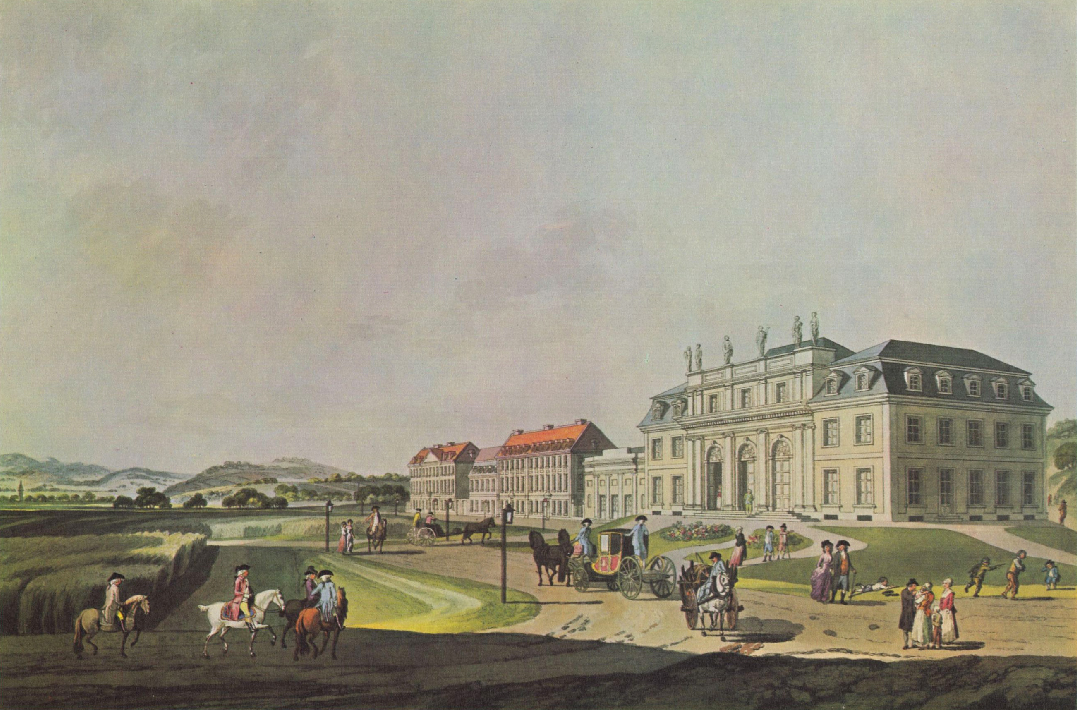
Johann Ziegler, Watercolored engraving of the Redoute in Bad Godesberg, Germany, 1792

Johann Andreas Ziegler (11 July 1749 – 18 March 1802) was a German and Austrian painter and copperplate engraver. Ziegler was born in Meiningen, and painted primarily landscapes. He traveled Austria and produced a collection of works depicting views of Vienna. Ziegler committed suicide in Vienna.

== Gallery ==
Illustrations from "Fifty Picturesque Views of the Rhine River from Speyer to Düsseldorf," created in the summer of 1792.

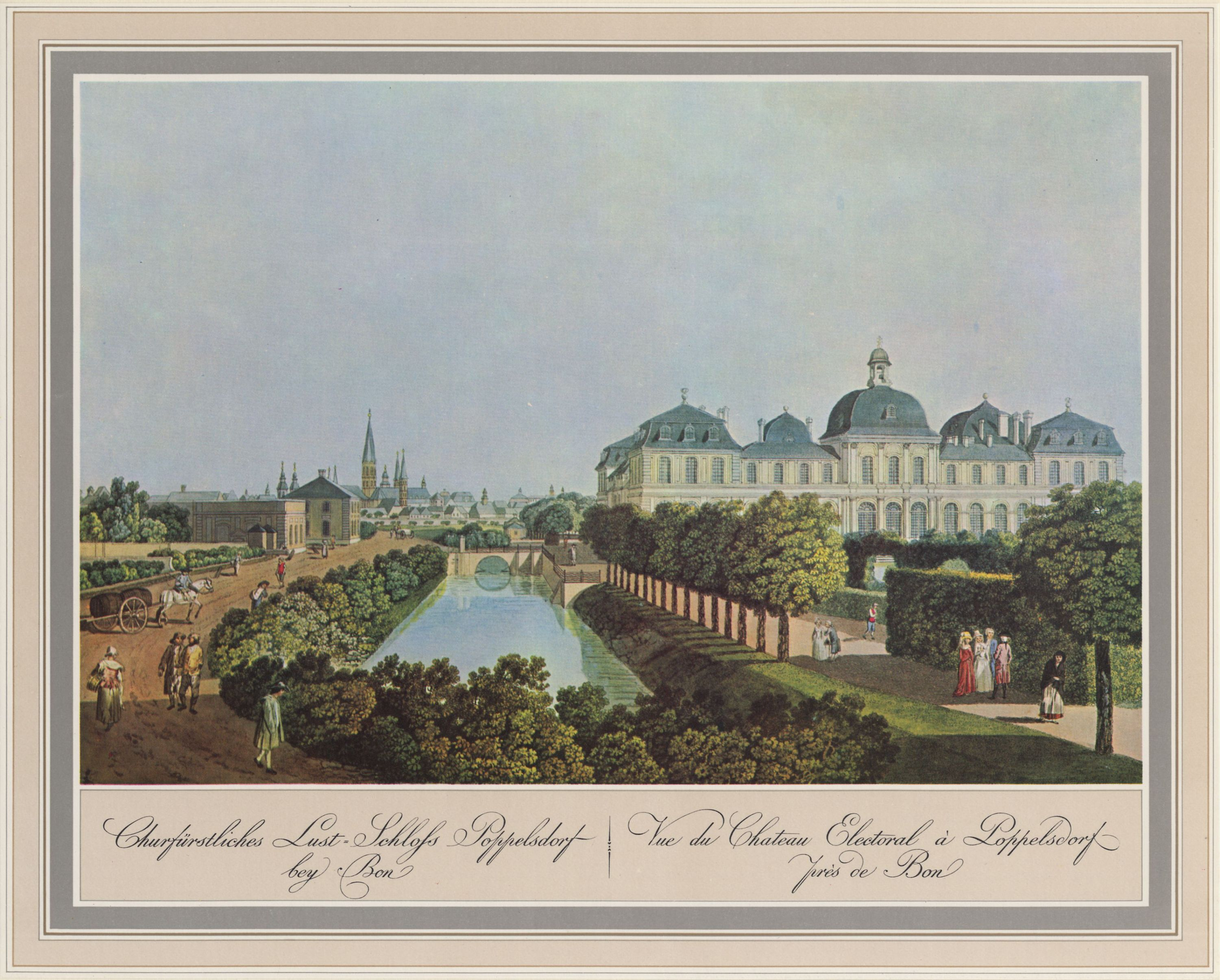
Poppelsdorf Palace in Bonn

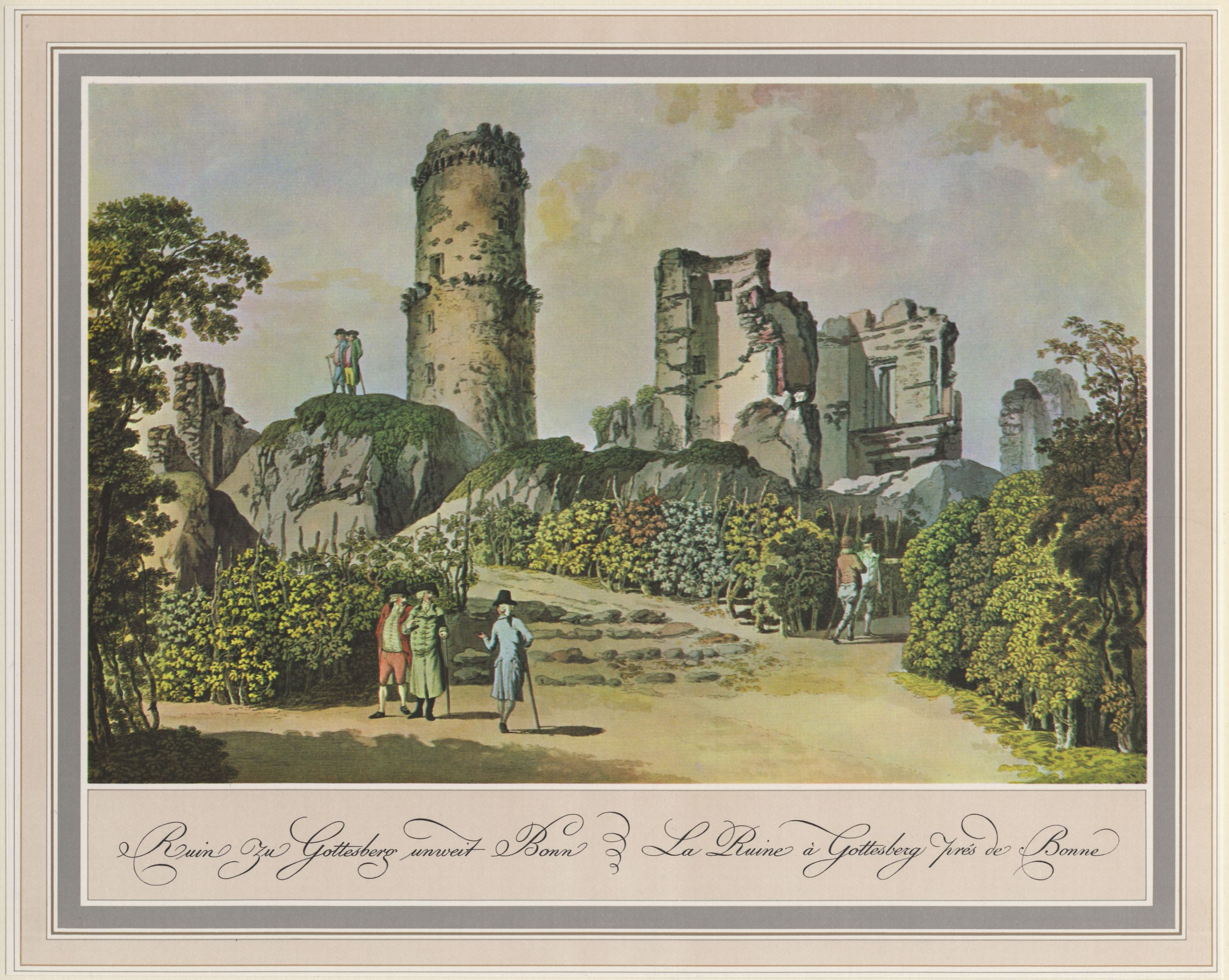
Bad Godesberg

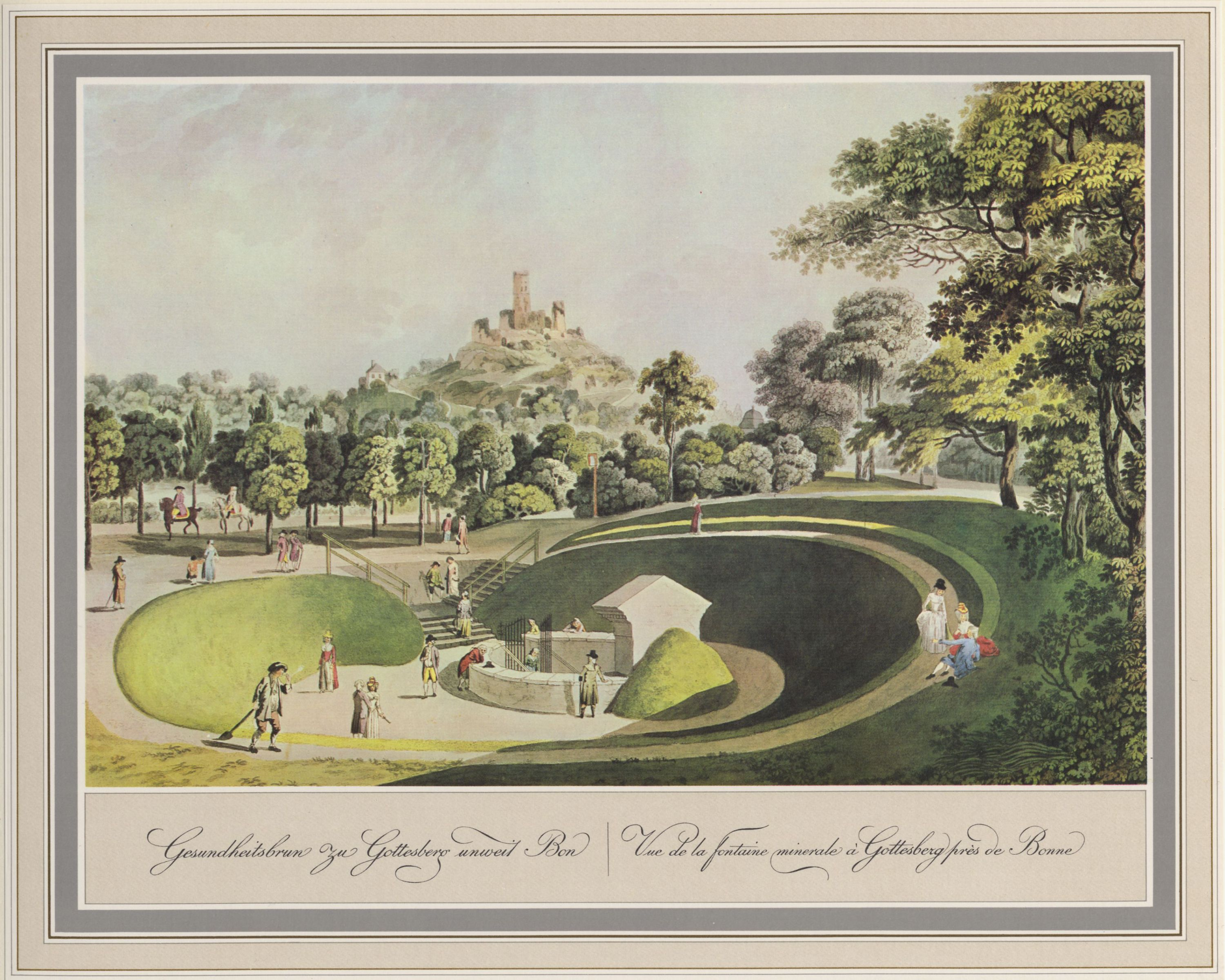
Bad Godesberg, mineral fountain and castle ruins

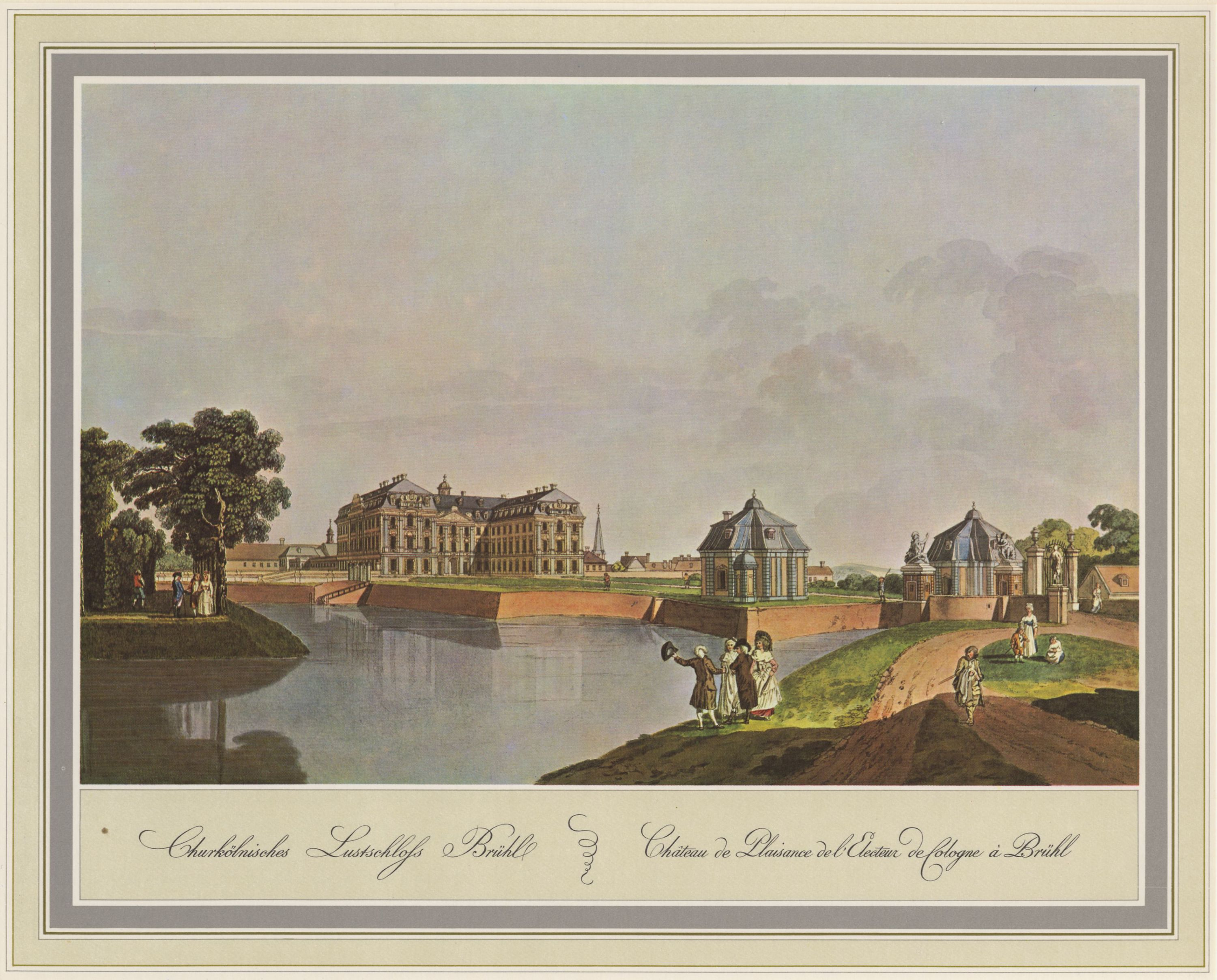
Augustusburg and Falkenlust Palaces in Brühl

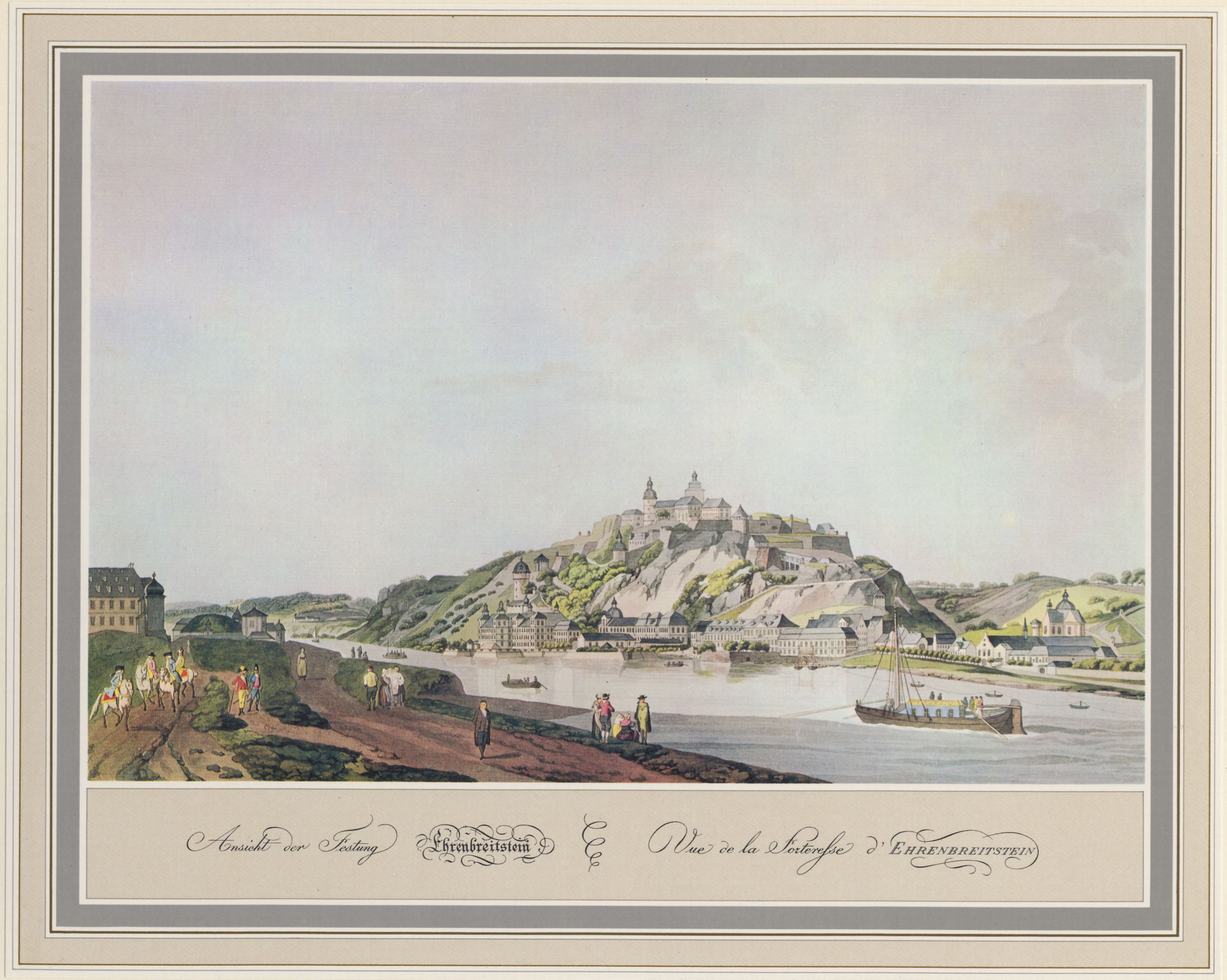
Ehrenbreitstein Fortress

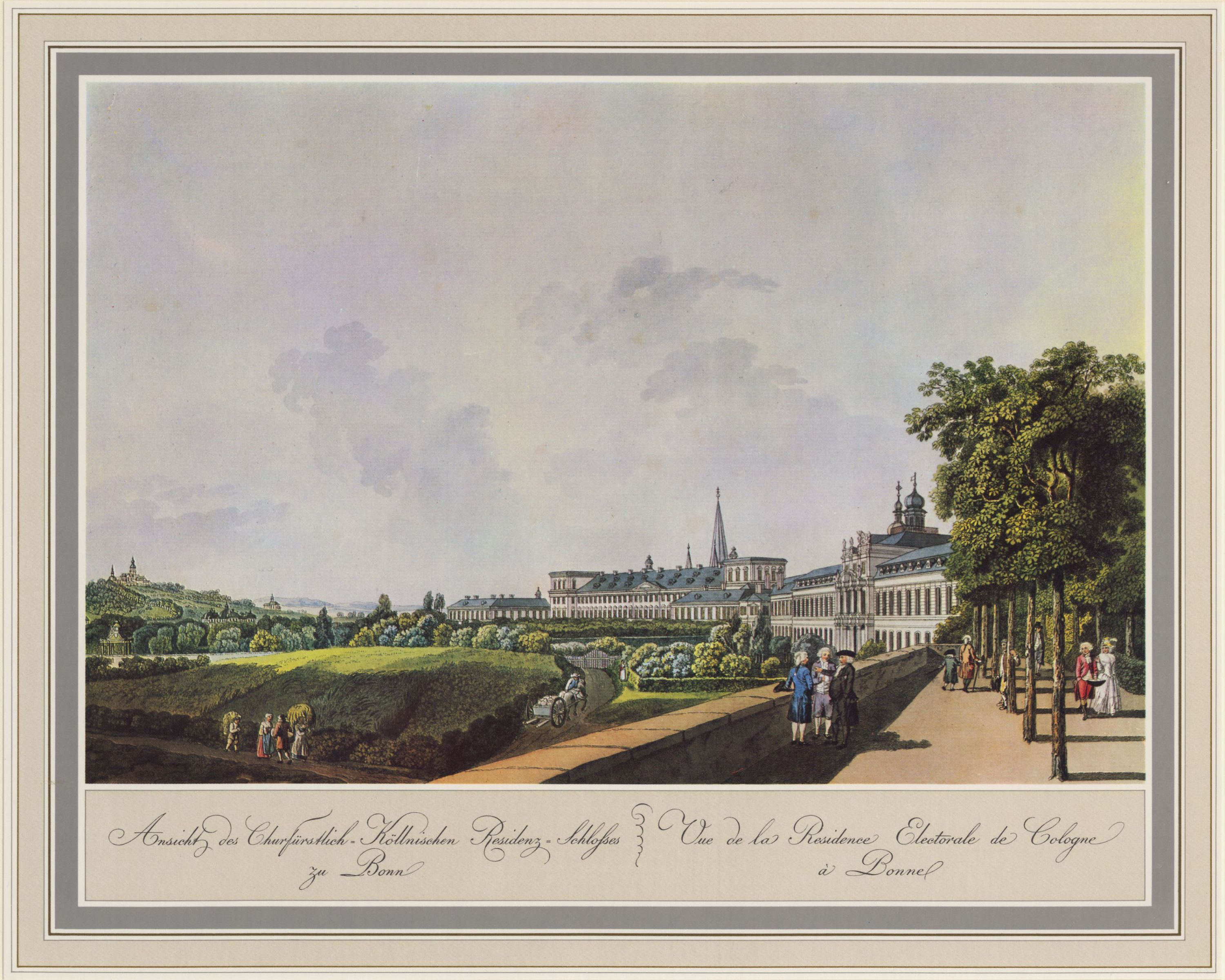
Bonn, Electoral Palace
