= George Beck (artist) =

British-American painter

- Born: c. 1749; England
- Died: December 24, 1812

George Beck (c. 1749 – December 24, 1812) was an artist and poet who flourished in America during the early republic era.

== Biography ==
Beck was born in England in 1749. He was employed as an instructor in mathematics at Woolwich from 1776, but was afterward dismissed. He emigrated to the United States in 1795, and was employed in painting pictures. One of his paintings, The Great Falls of the Potomac (1796) was purchased by President George Washington. Washington hung the painting in his parlor at Mount Vernon, where it remains today.

Beck also wrote short poems, made poetic translations from Anacreon, Homer, Virgil, and Horace, and in 1812 published Observations on the Comet.

In 1795, he served as a scout in General Anthony Wayne's campaign against the Native Americans.

With his wife Mary Menessier Beck, who was also an artist, Beck conducted a female seminary in Lexington, Kentucky for many years. He died in Lexington on December 24, 1812.

== Review ==
The obituary of Beck published in the Kentucky Gazette eulogized his nature paintings as one of the best among the works of the contemporary artists. However, he rarely was given any credit for his works and was driven in his later days to a life of drudgery at the school he was running, frustration and bitterness.

Although Beck failed to command the respect and recognition, his paintings of wild nature and western landscapes, "The Potomac River Breaking through the Blue Ridge" and "The Great Falls of the Potomac" purchased by George Washington in 1797, put his work on high esteem. Many of Beck's large paintings adorned the walls of the New Room on the eastern side of Mount Vernon.
