= Antoine Michel Filhol =

French engraver (1759–1812)

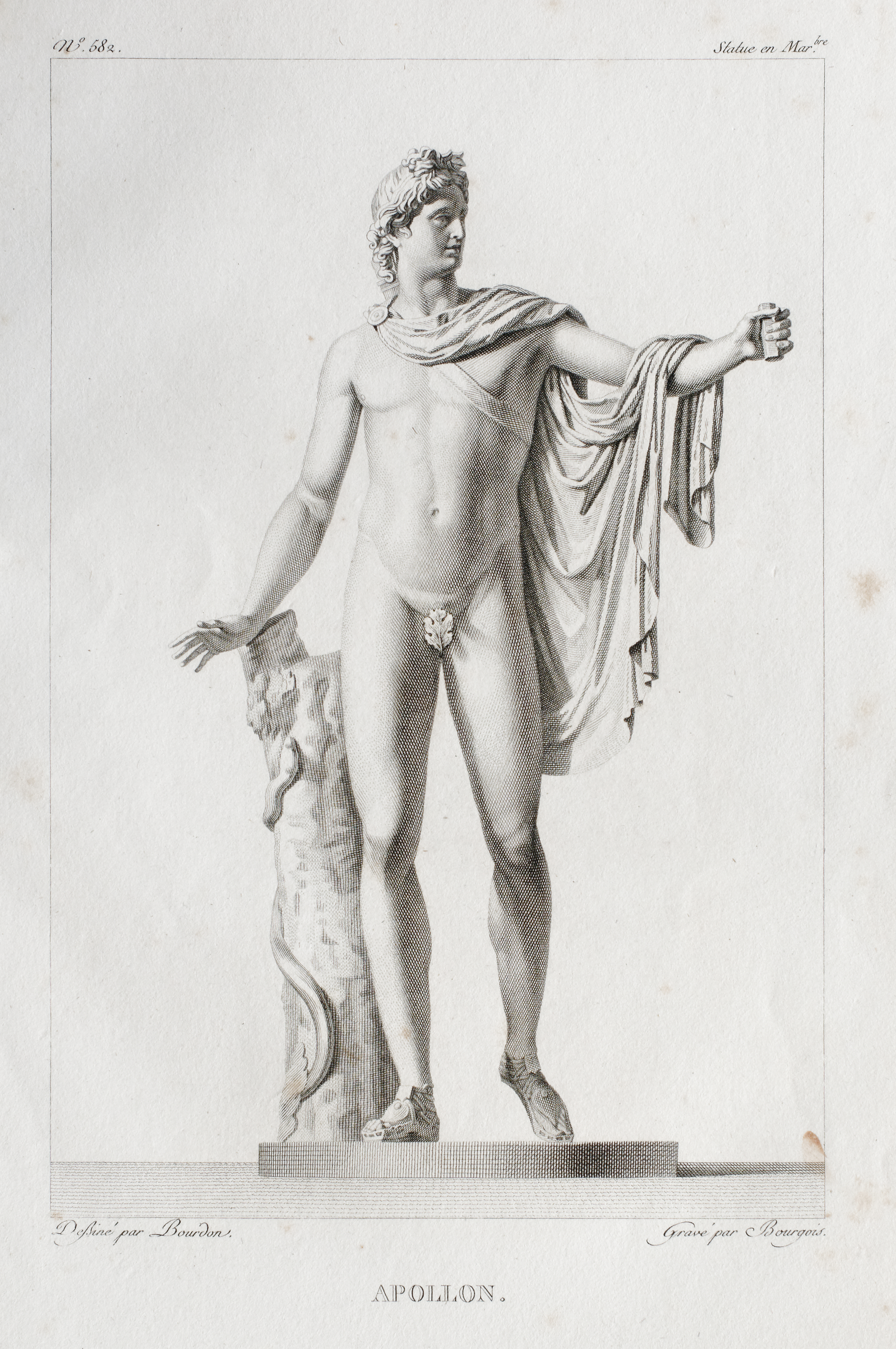
Apollo Belvedere, taken from the Cours historique et élémentaire de peinture ou Galerie complette du Museum central de France edited by Antoine Michel Filhol

Antoine Michel Filhol, a French engraver, born in Paris in 1759, was instructed by F. D. Née. He was very successful in depicting landscapes, and published several works on art, among which the most noted is the Galerie du Musée Napoléon publié par Filhol, graveur (Paris, 1804–1815), 10 vols., of which the earliest issues carried the title Cours historique et élémentaire de peinture, ou Galerie complette ... (etc.). He died in Paris 5 May 1812.
