= Portrait of Prince Schwarzenberg =

1819 painting by Thomas Lawrence

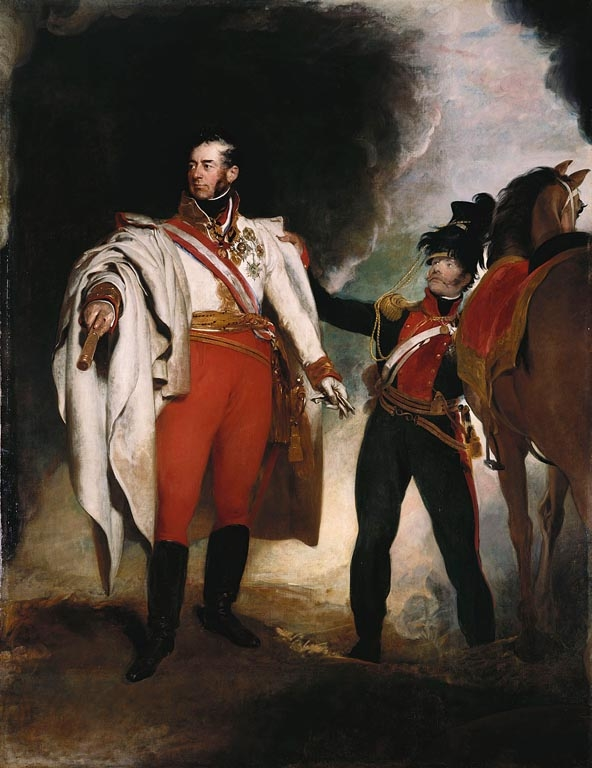
- Artist: Thomas Lawrence
- Year: 1819
- Type: Oil on canvas, portrait painting
- Dimensions: 314.9 cm × 242.7 cm (124.0 in × 95.6 in)
- Location: Royal Collection; Windsor Castle

Portrait of Prince Schwarzenberg is an 1819 portrait painting by the British artist Thomas Lawrence. It depicts the Austrian military commander Karl Philipp, Prince of Schwarzenberg.

== History and description ==
Lawrence, the leading portrait painter of Regency Britain, was commissioned by the future George IV to produce a series of paintings of the European leaders responsible for the defeat of Napoleon. Schwarzenberg was given overall command of the Allied armies fighting France. The War of the Sixth Coalition ended with the Allies capturing Paris and forcing Napoleon to abdicate in 1814. After attending the Congress of Aix-la-Chapelle, Lawrence travelled to Vienna to produce portraits of prominent Austrian figures.

Unusually amongst the Lawrence paintings commissioned by George, Schwarzenberg shares the picture with another figure. An uhlan stands nearby holding his horse and assisting the marshal to put on his greatcoat. Lawrence received the large sum 800 guineas for the work. The painting hangs in the Waterloo Chamber of Windsor Castle alongside paintings by Lawrence and others featuring the victorious Allied leaders.

== See also ==
- Portrait of Archduke Charles, a portrait by Lawrence of Schwarenzberg's predecessor as Austrian commander

== Bibliography ==
- Albinson, Cassandra, Funnell, Peter & Peltz, Lucy. Thomas Lawrence: Regency Power and Brilliance. Yale University Press, 2010. ISBN 0300167180.
- Crow, Thomas. Restoration: The Fall of Napoleon in the Course of European Art, 1812-1820. Princeton University Press, 2023. ISBN 0691181640.
- Goldring, Douglas. Regency Portrait Painter: The Life of Sir Thomas Lawrence. Macdonald, 1951. ISBN 1014181941.
- Levey, Michael. Sir Thomas Lawrence. Yale University Press, 2005. ISBN 0300109989.
