= Portrait of Alexander I of Russia =

1818 painting by Thomas Lawrence

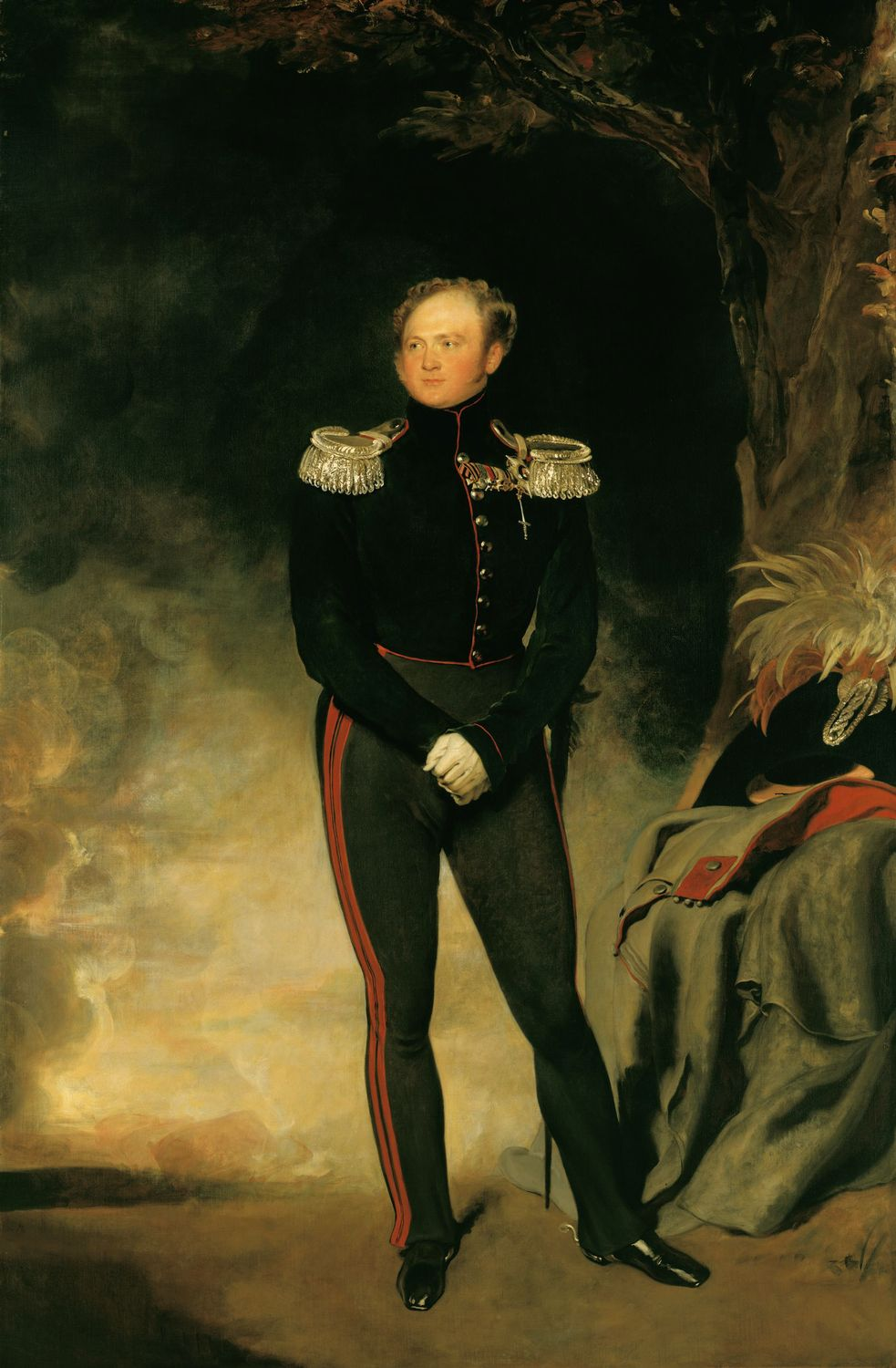
- Artist: Thomas Lawrence
- Year: 1814–18
- Type: Oil on canvas, portrait painting
- Dimensions: 273 cm × 179.1 cm (107 in × 70.5 in)
- Location: Royal Collection; Windsor Castle

Portrait of Alexander I of Russia is an 1818 portrait painting by the English artist Thomas Lawrence featuring the Russian Tsar Alexander I, who had reigned since the overthrow and murder of his father in 1801. It was one of a large series of paintings that Lawrence, the most fashionable painter of the Regency Era, produced of European leaders.

== Sitter ==
Alexander had made peace and allied with Napoleon at the Treaty of Tilsit in 1807, but following the French invasion of Russia in 1812 he had joined forces with Britain to repel him. After the initial defeat of the French Emperor in 1814 during the War of the Sixth Coalition, the Allied sovereigns visited London for victory celebrations in June 1814. Alexander remained a prominent member of the international Congress System, until 1825, when he died in mysterious circumstances.

== Painting ==
The Prince Regent commissioned Lawrence to paint several of the visiting dignitaries. The resulting works included his Portrait of Marshal Blucher and a depiction of the Russian Cossack commander Matvei Platov. Aledander I is depicted standing, looking to the left, in a dark background. He is shown in the uniform who wore at the Battle of Leipzig in 1813.

Lawrence was paid 500 guineas for the work. It remains in the Royal Collection and is now on display in the Waterloo Chamber at Windsor Castle.

== Bibliography ==
- Crow, Thomas. Restoration: The Fall of Napoleon in the Course of European Art, 1812-1820. ISBN 9780691181646. Princeton University Press, 2023.
- Goldring, Douglas. Regency Portrait Painter: The Life of Sir Thomas Lawrence. ISBN 1014181941. Macdonald, 1951.
- Levey, Michael. Sir Thomas Lawrence. ISBN 0300109989. Yale University Press, 2005.
- Nickell, William. The Death of Tolstoy: Russia on the Eve, Astapovo Station, 1910. ISBN 9780801448348. Cornell University Press, 2011.
