= Portrait of Frederick William III of Prussia =

Painting by Thomas Lawrence

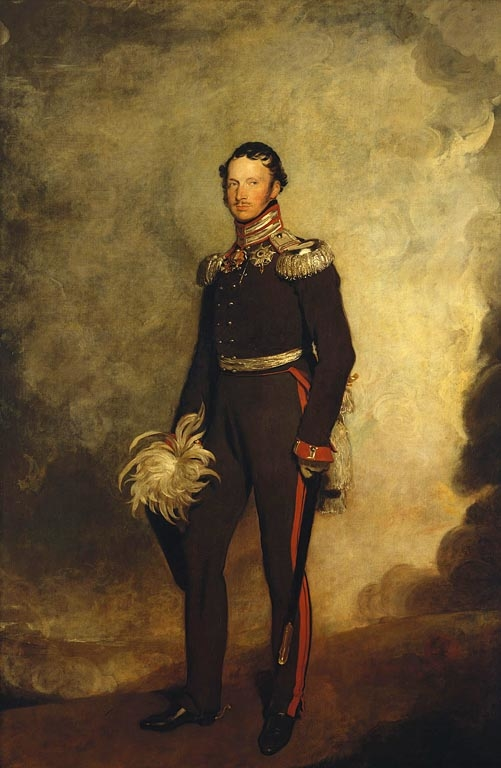
- Artist: Thomas Lawrence
- Year: 1814–18
- Type: Oil on canvas, portrait painting
- Dimensions: 270.6 cm × 180.1 cm (106.5 in × 70.9 in)
- Location: Royal Collection, Windsor Castle

Portrait of Frederick William III of Prussia is portrait painting by the British artist Thomas Lawrence of Frederick William III, King of Prussia. Begun in 1814 during the Visit by the Allied sovereigns to England to celebrate the defeat of France and abdication of Napoleon Bonaparte, it was completed during the Congress of Aix-la-Chapelle in 1818.

Lawrence was Britain's leading portraitist and a future President of the Royal Academy. It was one of a series of works commissioned from artist by the Prince Regent to celebrate the Allied victory in the Napoleonic Wars. From 1814 to 1825 he painted portraits of many European monarchs and leaders involved in the defeat of France. Originally it was suggested that Lawrence should paint a group portrait of the victorious allies, but it was then decided to produce individual portraits which better suited Lawrence's style of working.

Frederick William ruled Prussia between 1797 and 1840. Lawrence depicts the king at full-length in military uniform with swirling smoke of battle behind him. This was a reference to his participation in the recent wars, particularly during the Battle of Jena–Auerstedt in 1806 and the War of the Sixth Coalition (1813-14). He holds a plumed hat in his hand and has a scabbard at his side. His coat bears the Prussian decorations of the newly-created Iron Cross, the Order of the Red Eagle, the Order of the Black Eagle and the Order of the Garter which had been presented to him by the Prince Regent in 1814.

The painting was commissioned by the Regent for the fee of five hundred guineas. Although included in the inventory of Carlton House from 1819, it was still in the artist's studio at his death in 1830. Today it hangs in the Waterloo Chamber of Windsor Castle with the other paintings

== Bibliography ==
- Goldring, Douglas. Regency Portrait Painter: The Life of Sir Thomas Lawrence. ISBN 1014181941. Macdonald, 1951.
- Levey, Michael. Sir Thomas Lawrence. ISBN 0300109989. Yale University Press, 2005.
