= Portrait of Count Nesselrode =

1818 painting by Thomas Lawrence

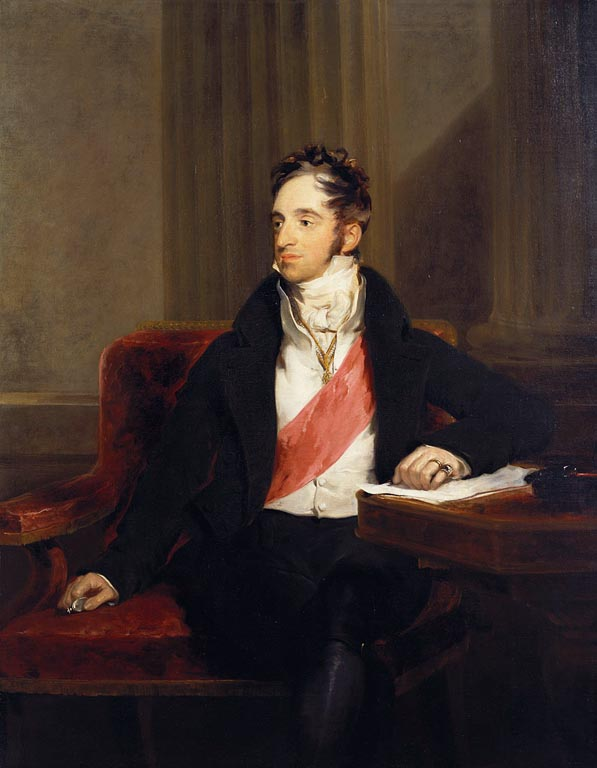
- Artist: Thomas Lawrence
- Year: 1818
- Type: Oil on canvas, portrait
- Dimensions: 143 cm × 112.4 cm (56 in × 44.3 in)
- Location: Royal Collection; Windsor Castle

Portrait of Count Nesselrode is an oil on canvas portrait painting by the British artist Thomas Lawrence from 1818. It depicts the Russian statesman Karl Nesselrode.

== History and description ==
The painting was part of a large-scale Commission from the British Prince Regent for Lawrence to portray leading figures of the alliance to defeat Napoleon. Nesselrode attended the Congress of Vienna with Tsar Alexander I and was appointed foreign minister of Russia in 1816, holding the post for four decades until 1856.

Lawrence travelled to attend the Congress of Aix-la-Chapelle. Held primarily to agree the end of the allied occupation of France, it also involved the personal meetings between rulers and statesman that was part of the Concert of Europe. He shows Nesselrode seated in an armchair in civilian dress, wearing the Order of St Alexander Newski and the Order of the Annunciation.

Lawrence was paid three hundred guineas by the Prince Regent for the work. Today still part of the Royal Collection, it is on display at the Waterloo Chamber at Windsor Castle.

== Bibliography ==
- Ingle, Harold N. Nesselrode and the Russian Rapprochement with Britain, 1836-1844. University of California Press, 1976
- Levey, Michael. Sir Thomas Lawrence. Yale University Press, 2005.
- Robinson, John Martin. Windsor Castle: Official Guidebook. Royal Collection, 2006.
