= Portrait of Marshal Blücher =

1814 painting by Thomas Lawrence

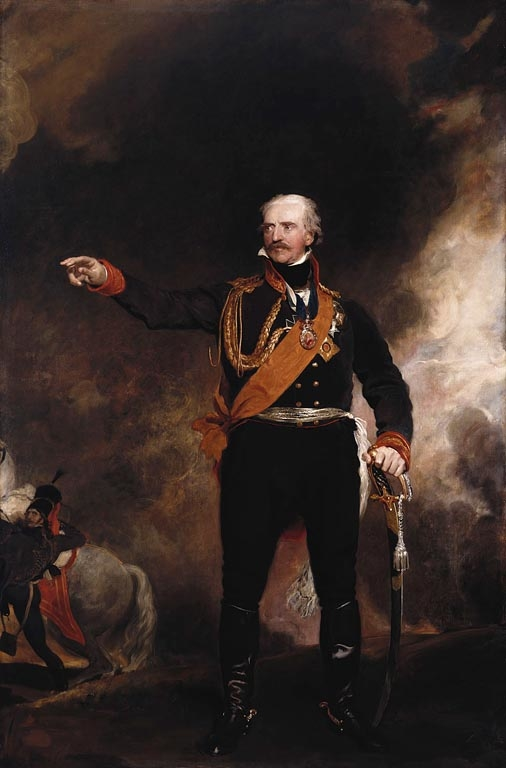
- Artist: Thomas Lawrence
- Year: 1814
- Type: Oil on canvas, portrait
- Dimensions: 270.9 cm × 179.2 cm (106.7 in × 70.6 in)
- Location: Royal Collection, Windsor Castle

The Portrait of Marshal Blücher is an oil on canvas portrait painting by the English artist Thomas Lawrence of the Prussian Field Marshal Gebhard Leberecht von Blücher. It was created in 1814.

== History and description ==
Blücher was a noted military commander who had played a key role in the 1813-14 defeat of Napoleon's French Empire by a coalition of Allies including Britain, Prussia, Russia and Austria, culminating in the capture of Paris in April 1814. It was painted while Blücher was in London for the Allied sovereigns' visit to England, victory celebrations attended by the leaders of the allied nations including Blücher's monarch Frederick William III. Blücher was popular with the British public during his visit and in the euphoria that followed the victory he was frequently mobbed in the streets of the city. The following year he gained further success when he joined forces with the Duke of Wellington in the Waterloo Campaign to inflict the final defeat of Napoleon, who had escaped from Elba.

The work was commissioned by the Prince Regent for four hundred guineas. Blücher is shown against a warlike background in his field marshal's uniform, wearing a miniature of the Regent, the Prussian Iron Cross and Order of the Black Eagle, the Austrian Order of Maria Theresa and the Russian Cross of St. George, decorations of the four major allies who defeated Napoleon. In the background a Uhlan mounts his horse.

It was exhibited at the Royal Academy exhibition in 1815 and was possibly intended for Carlton House, the Regent's London residence. It remained in Lawrence's studio for some years before being hung in the newly-completed Waterloo Chamber at Windsor Castle where it remains today as part of the Royal Collection. The chamber features many other European leaders painted by Lawrence, many of them at the 1818 Congress of Aix-la-Chapelle. An 1814 portrait of the Russian general Matvei Platov serves almost as a rough companion piece to the artist's depiction of Blücher, featuring a similar pose. The composition of both seem influenced by Joshua Reynolds' earlier works, particularly his depiction of the Marquess of Granby.

== See also ==
- Portrait of the Duke of Wellington, 1815 painting by Lawrence

== Bibliography ==
- Hall, Michael. Art, Passion & Power: The Story of the Royal Collection. Random House, 2017.
- Levey, Michael. Sir Thomas Lawrence. Yale University Press, 2005.
- Gould, John & Nieuwenhuys, C.J. Biographical Dictionary of Painters: Sculptors, Engravers, and Architects. Routledge, 1839.
