= The Allied Sovereigns at Petworth =

1817 painting by Thomas Phillips

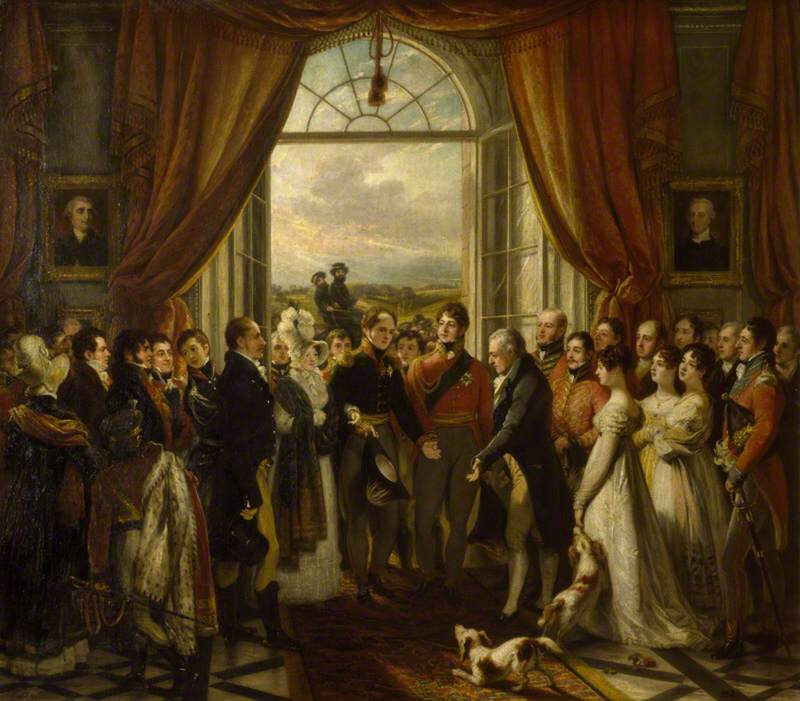
- Artist: Thomas Phillips
- Year: 1817
- Type: Oil on canvas, history painting
- Dimensions: 128 cm × 147 cm (50 in × 58 in)
- Location: National Trust; Petworth House

The Allied Sovereigns at Petworth is an oil on canvas painting by the British artist Thomas Phillips, from 1817.

== History and description ==
It depicts the gathering of several European leaders in the Marble Room at Petworth House in Sussex on 24 June 1814 during the Allied sovereigns' visit to England following the victory over Napoleon. Petworth's owner George Wyndham, 3rd Earl of Egremont is shown being presented by the Prince Regent to Tsar Alexander I of Russia. Frederick William III of Prussia and other distinguished guests are also shown, and in the background on either side are paintings of Charles James Fox and William Pitt the Younger, long-standing political rivals.

== Bibliography ==
- Cameron, Wendy. Assisting Emigration to Upper Canada: The Petworth Project, 1832–1837. McGill-Queen's Press, 2000.
- Fairweather, Maria. Pilgrim Princess: A Life of Princess Zinaida Volkonsky. Robinson, 2000.
- Rowell, Christopher, Warrell, Ian & Brown, David Blayney. Turner at Petworth. Harry N. Abrams, 2002.
