= Portrait of Archduke Charles =

1819 painting by Thomas Lawrence

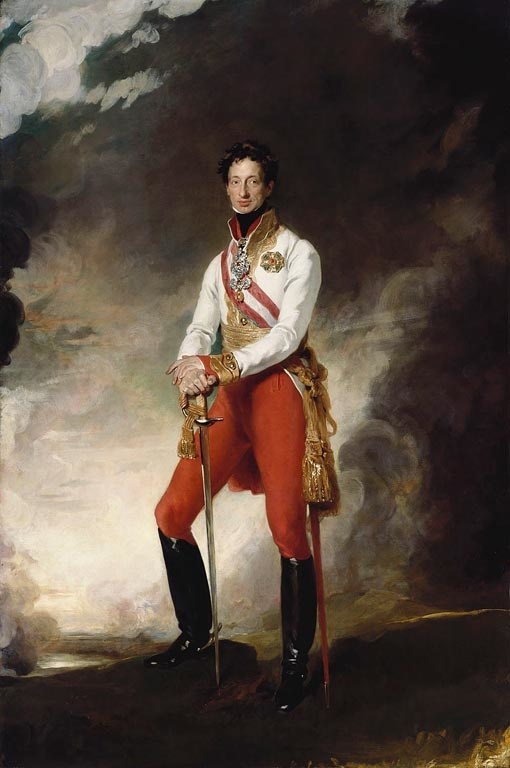
- Artist: Thomas Lawrence
- Year: 1819
- Type: Oil on canvas, portrait painting
- Dimensions: 270.1 cm × 179.5 cm (106.3 in × 70.7 in)
- Location: Royal Collection; Windsor Castle

Portrait of Archduke Charles is an 1819 portrait painting by the English artist Sir Thomas Lawrence of the Austrian general Archduke Charles, Duke of Teschen.

== History and description ==
A member of the House of Habsburg, Charles was the younger brother of Francis I of Austria. During the Napoleonic Wars he commanded Austrian forces in the Allied coalitions against the French Empire. He won a notable victory against Napoleon at the Battle of Aspern-Essling in 1809 before his defeat at the Battle of Wagram.

Lawrence was Britain's leading portrait painter of the Regency era. From 1814 he was commissioned by the Prince Regent to paint the leading members of the coalition that defeated Napoleon. He painted this work on a visit to the Austrian capital Vienna in 1819. Amongst others he painted on this trip was his Portrait of Francis I of Austria and a Portrait of Napoleon II, the great nephew of Charles.

He shows the Archduke wearing the white and red military uniform of Austria, and decorated with the Order of the Golden Fleece and the Military Order of Maria Theresa. Influenced by the military portraits of Joshua Reynolds, it show the archduke as towering figure despite his relatively short stature in real life. Today part of the Royal Collection, it hangs in the Waterloo Chamber of Windsor Castle as part of a series of twenty eight paintings produced by Lawrence.

== Bibliography ==
- Crow, Thomas. Restoration: The Fall of Napoleon in the Course of European Art, 1812-1820. Princeton University Press, 2023. ISBN 0691181640.
- Goldring, Douglas. Regency Portrait Painter: The Life of Sir Thomas Lawrence. Macdonald, 1951. ISBN 1014181941.
- Levey, Michael. Sir Thomas Lawrence. Yale University Press, 2005. ISBN 0300109989.
- Wagar, Chip. Double Emperor: The Life and Times of Francis of Austria. Rowman & Littlefield, 2018. ISBN 0761870776.
