= Portrait of the Duke of Angoulême =

1825 painting by Thomas Lawrence

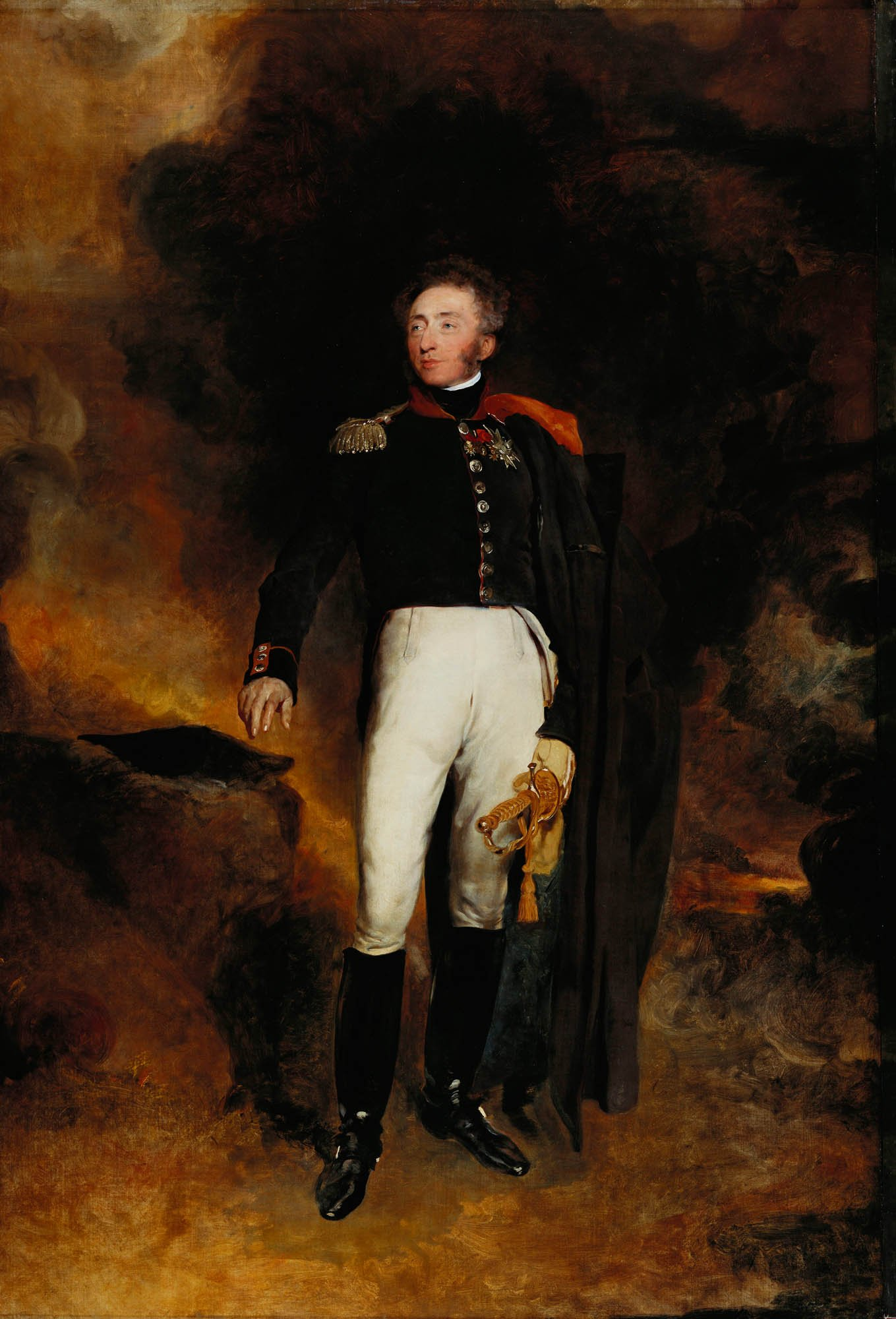
- Artist: Thomas Lawrence
- Year: 1825
- Type: Oil on canvas, portrait painting
- Dimensions: 269.7 cm × 178.3 cm (106.2 in × 70.2 in)
- Location: Royal Collection, Windsor Castle

Portrait of the Duke of Angoulême is an 1825 portrait painting by the British artist Sir Thomas Lawrence depicting Louis Antoine, Duke of Angoulême, the Dauphin and heir to his father Charles X.

== History and description ==
Lawrence was commissioned by George IV to paint portraits of leading European figures who had been involved in the defeat of the French Emperor Napoleon during the Napoleonic Wars. Angoulême had been in exile in England with his uncle Louis XVIII. In March 1814 he arrived in southwestern France following the fall of Bordeaux to British troops. There he proclaimed the Bourbon Restoration. After his father's abdication during the July Revolution of 1830 he went into exile and from 1836 to his death in 1844 was the Legitimist pretender to the French throne, styled as Louis XIX by his supporters.

Lawrence depicts Angoulême in military uniform with a cloak against a background representing the storm of war. Lawrence also painted his Portrait of Charles X and his Portrait of the Duchess of Berry while in Paris. He was paid five hundred guineas for the work. The painting is today in the Royal Collection and hangs in the Waterloo Chamber at Windsor Castle.

== See also ==
- Portrait of the Duke of Angoulême, an 1824 equestrian portrait by Horace Vernet
- The Duke of Angoulême at the Taking of Trocadero, an 1828 portrait by Paul Delaroche

== Bibliography ==
- Clark, Christopher. Revolutionary Spring: Europe Aflame and the Fight for a New World, 1848-1849. ISBN 0525575219. Random House, 2024.
- Goldring, Douglas. Regency Portrait Painter: The Life of Sir Thomas Lawrence. ISBN 1014181941. Macdonald, 1951.
- Hutchinson, Martin. Britain's Greatest Prime Minister: Lord Liverpool. ISBN 0718848225. Lutterworth Press, 2021.
- Levey, Michael. Sir Thomas Lawrence. ISBN 0300109989. Yale University Press, 2005.
- Robinson, John Martin. Windsor Castle: Official Guidebook. ISBN 1902163346. Royal Collection, 2006.
