= Portrait of Francis I of Austria =

Painting by Thomas Lawrence

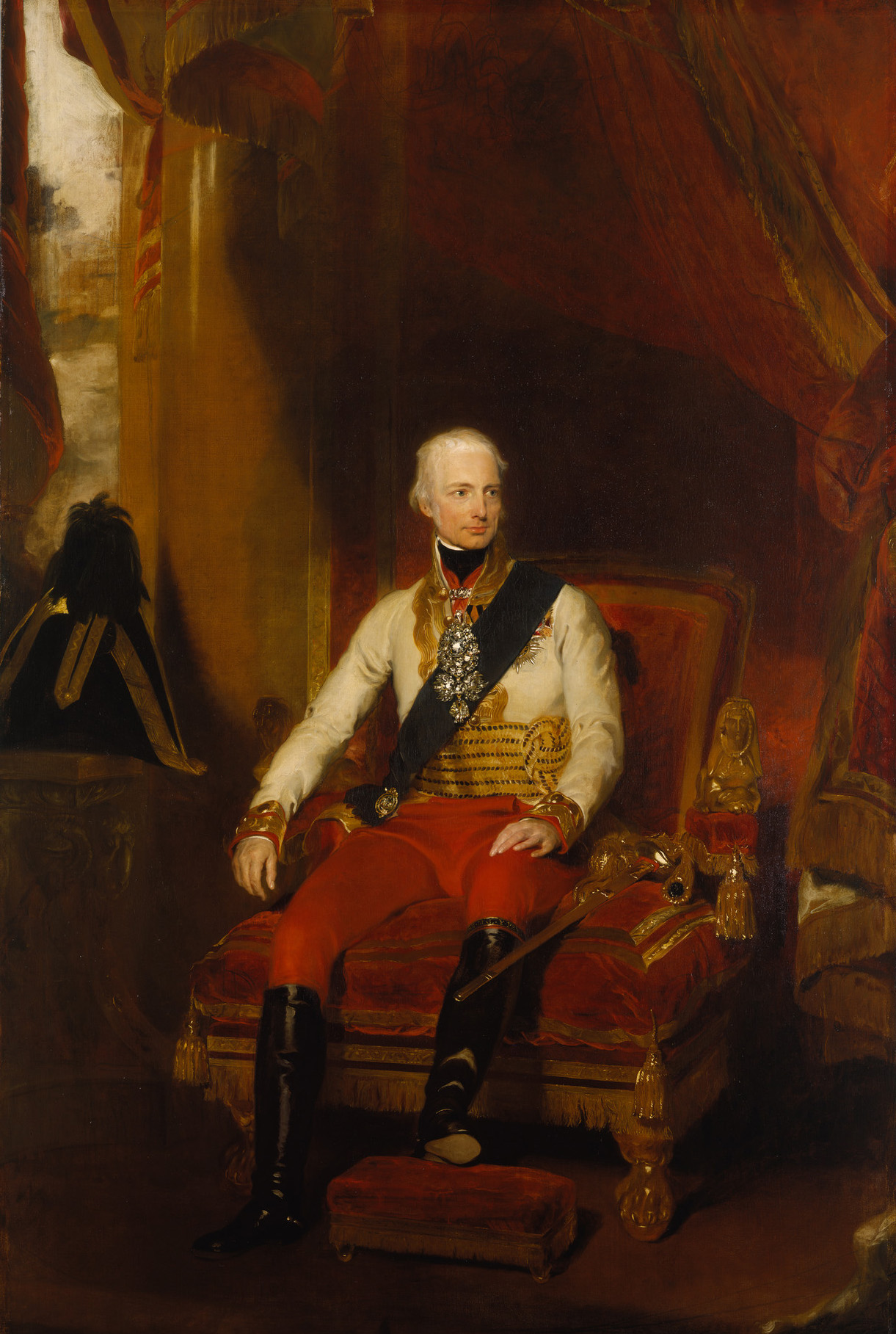
- Artist: Thomas Lawrence
- Year: 1818–19
- Type: Oil on canvas
- Dimensions: 266.5 cm × 175.5 cm (104.9 in × 69.1 in)
- Location: Royal Collection, Windsor Castle

The Portrait of Francis I of Austria is a painting by the British artist Sir Thomas Lawrence depicting the Austrian Emperor Francis I (previously Francis II of the Holy Roman Empire).

== History and description ==
Commissioned by the Prince Regent of Britain, it was initially painted during the Congress of Aix-la-Chapelle in 1818 and completed over the following months. Lawrence, Britain's leading portrait painter of the Regency Era, was commissioned by the Regent to depict many European leaders who had participated in the defeat of the French Empire during the Napoleonic Wars.

The Prince Regent commissioned the work for 500 guineas. The portrait shows Francis wearing military uniform with a plumed hat on the table beside him. He wears the British Order of the Garter and more prominently the Austrian Order of the Golden Fleece. Lawrence observed difficulties with the Emperor's face which he found long, thin and melancholic. However, when Francis smiled he showed a benevolence which Lawrence depicted in the painting. Unlike the other Allied monarchs, Lawrence portrayed Francis in full-length and seated on a throne. The finished portrait was still in Lawrence's studio at his death in 1830. Today the painting is part of the Royal Collection and hangs in the Waterloo Chamber of Windsor Castle along with portraits of other European leaders of the era, many of them painted by Lawrence.

== Bibliography ==
- Levey, Michael. Sir Thomas Lawrence. ISBN 0300109989. Yale University Press, 2005.
- Wagar, Chip. Double Emperor: The Life and Times of Francis of Austria. ISBN 0761870776. Rowman & Littlefield, 2018.
