= Waterloo Chamber =

Ballroom in Windsor Castle, England

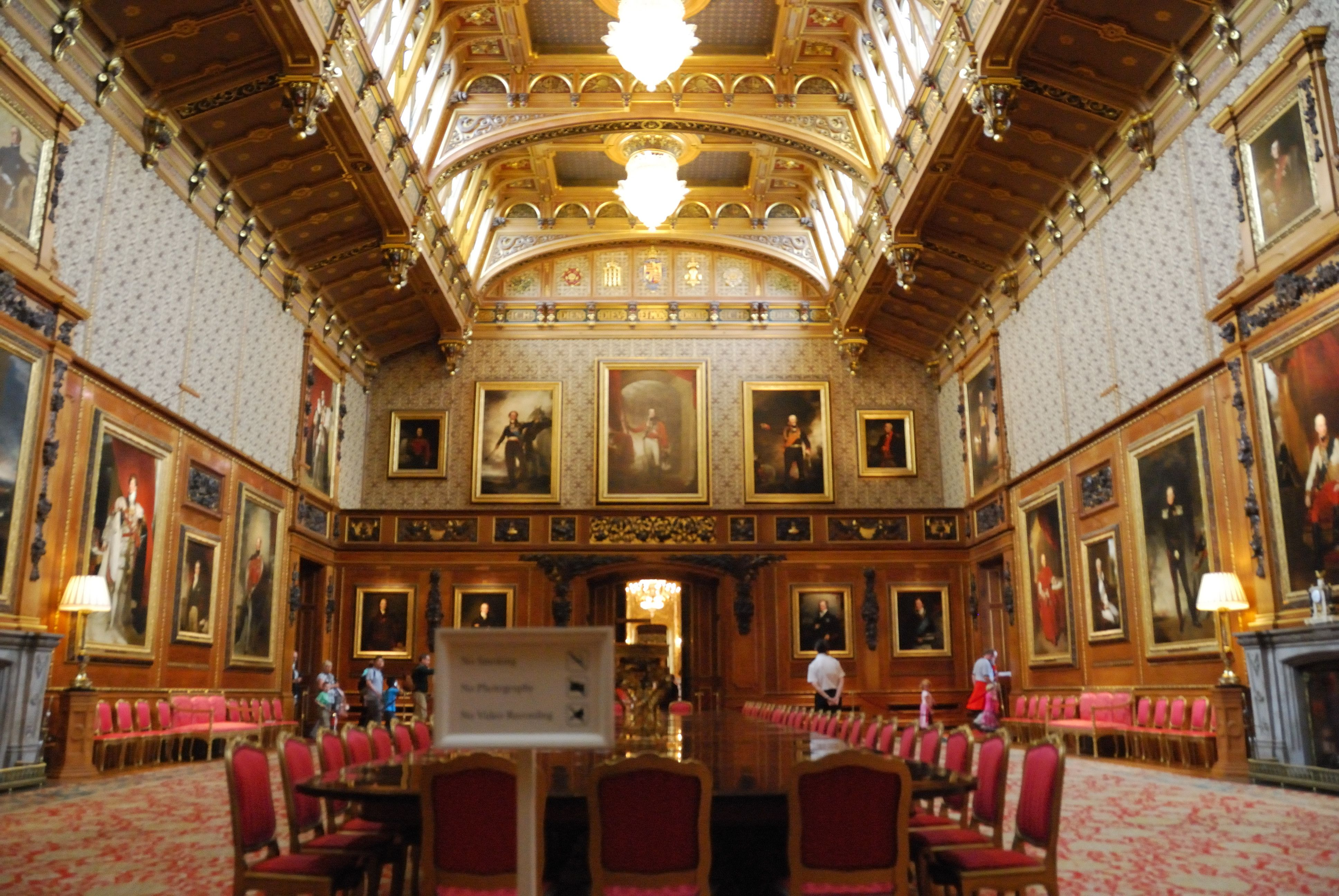
Waterloo Chamber in 2009

The Waterloo Chamber, dating from 1830 to 1831, is a large room in Windsor Castle dedicated to the military defeat of the French Emperor Napoleon Bonaparte by British, Prussian, Russian, and Austrian forces and the victory of the Duke of Wellington at the Battle of Waterloo.

== Designs ==
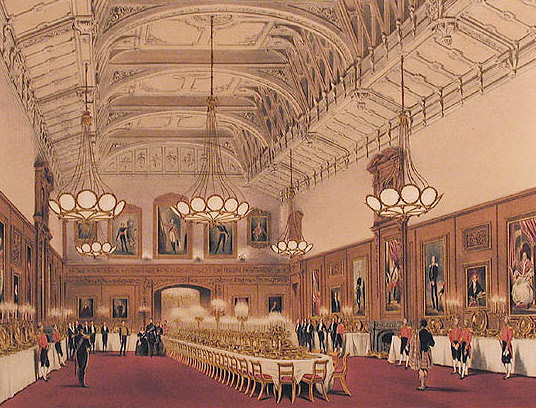
The Waterloo Chamber in 1844. Watercolor by Joseph Nash

Designed by the architect Jeffry Wyatville to replace the Queen's Drawing Room, Queen's Ballroom, Queen's Audience Chamber, Queen's Presence Chamber, Queen's Guard Chamber, King's Presence Chamber, King's Audience Room, King's Drawing Chamber, and King's Dining Chamber, which were all in Hugh May's 17th-century structure, the Waterloo Chamber was formed, along with the Grand Reception Room, White Drawing Room, Green Drawing Room, Crimson Drawing Room, State Dining Room, and Octagonal Dining Room.

== Portraits included in the chamber ==
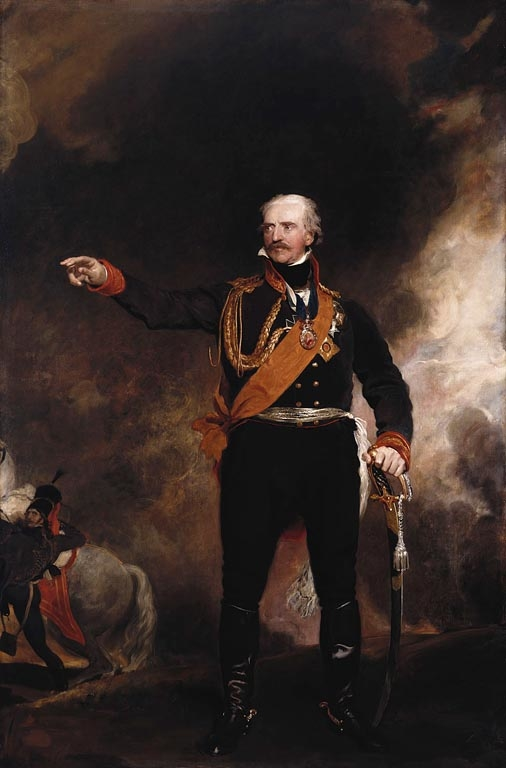
Portrait of Marshal Blücher, painted by Lawrence while Blücher was visiting London in 1814.

The portrait painter Sir Thomas Lawrence was commissioned by King George IV to paint all the major figures who came together to defeat Napoleon, as well as figures from the restored French monarchy, and today these works still hang assembled there. Lawrence both traveled Europe and at another time kept a studio in London to complete the task, which was delayed by Napoleon's escape from Elba.

Among the people depicted in the chamber by Lawrence are Tsar Alexander I of Russia, Emperor Francis I of Austria, King Frederick William III of Prussia, Field Marshal Karl Philipp, Prince of Schwarzenberg, Armand-Emmanuel, Duke of Richelieu, John, Count Capo D'Istria, Archduke Charles of Austria, Napoleon II, Pope Pius VII, Cardinal Consalvi, Charles X of France, and the aforementioned Duke of Wellington. Although the majority of portraits in the room are by Lawrence, several of the works added in later years are by other painters, including William IV of Great Britain (who did not serve in the Napoleonic Wars) by Sir David Wilkie (1832), General Sir James Kempt by Robert McInnes (1835), Frederick William, Duke of Brunswick by William Corden (1848), King William II of the Netherlands, when Prince of Orange by Nicaise de Keyser (1846), and General Rowland Hill, 1st Viscount Hill by Henry William Pickersgill (c.1820).

== In the 20th and 21st Centuries ==
In 1940, the Lawrence paintings were removed from their frames for safekeeping from German air raids and later temporarily replaced by pantomime works on wallpaper by then-teenage evacuee art student Claude Whatham. The new works were commissioned by the young Princesses Elizabeth and Margaret as the background for their series of pantomimes. In 1943, Elizabeth and Margaret put on a performance of the fairytale Aladdin. The future Prince Philip was in the audience while on leave from the Royal Navy; friends and family who were present later related that this was the first time the royal romance began to take hold. Whatham's pantomime series was once again exhibited at the castle in 2020.

In 2004, the musical Les Misérables (then currently in production in the West End) was staged in the chamber, which for the evening was renamed "The Music Room" as part of the state dinner and event marking the end of the celebrations for the one hundredth anniversary of the Entente Cordiale between the United Kingdom and France which significantly improved diplomatic relations between the two neighboring nations. Once again, the Lawrence paintings were temporarily removed from the room for the event attended by Queen Elizabeth II and the French President Jacques Chirac, as well as their respective spouses and many other luminaries. The irony of holding such an event on such an occasion in a room dedicated to the victory of the United Kingdom and most of Europe over Napoleon was remarked upon in the press, which led to the chamber's one night name change.

Each June, the Garter Day luncheon for the Knights and Ladies Companion of the Garter is held in the chamber.

== Gallery ==
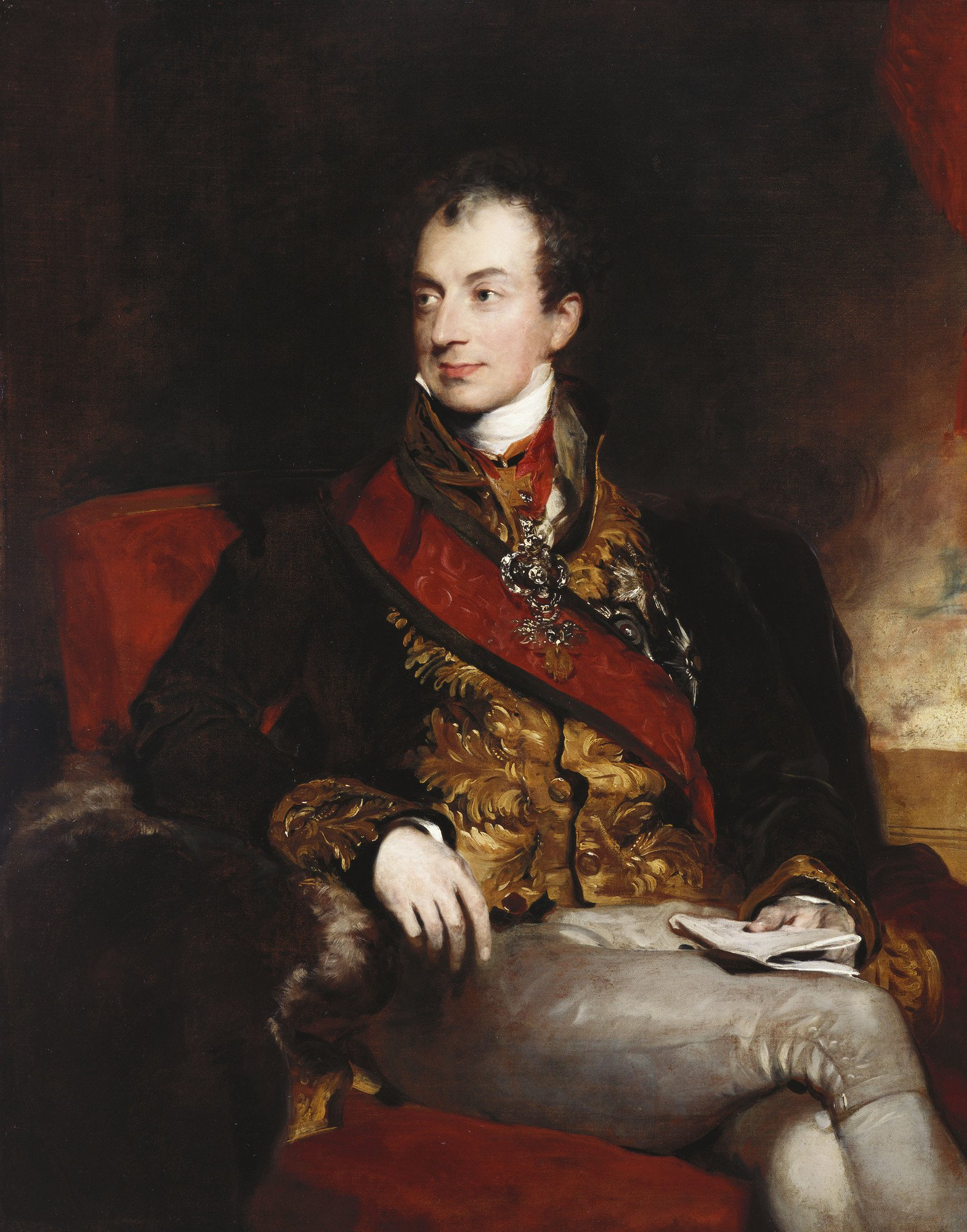
Portrait of Prince Metternich by Thomas Lawrence, 1815

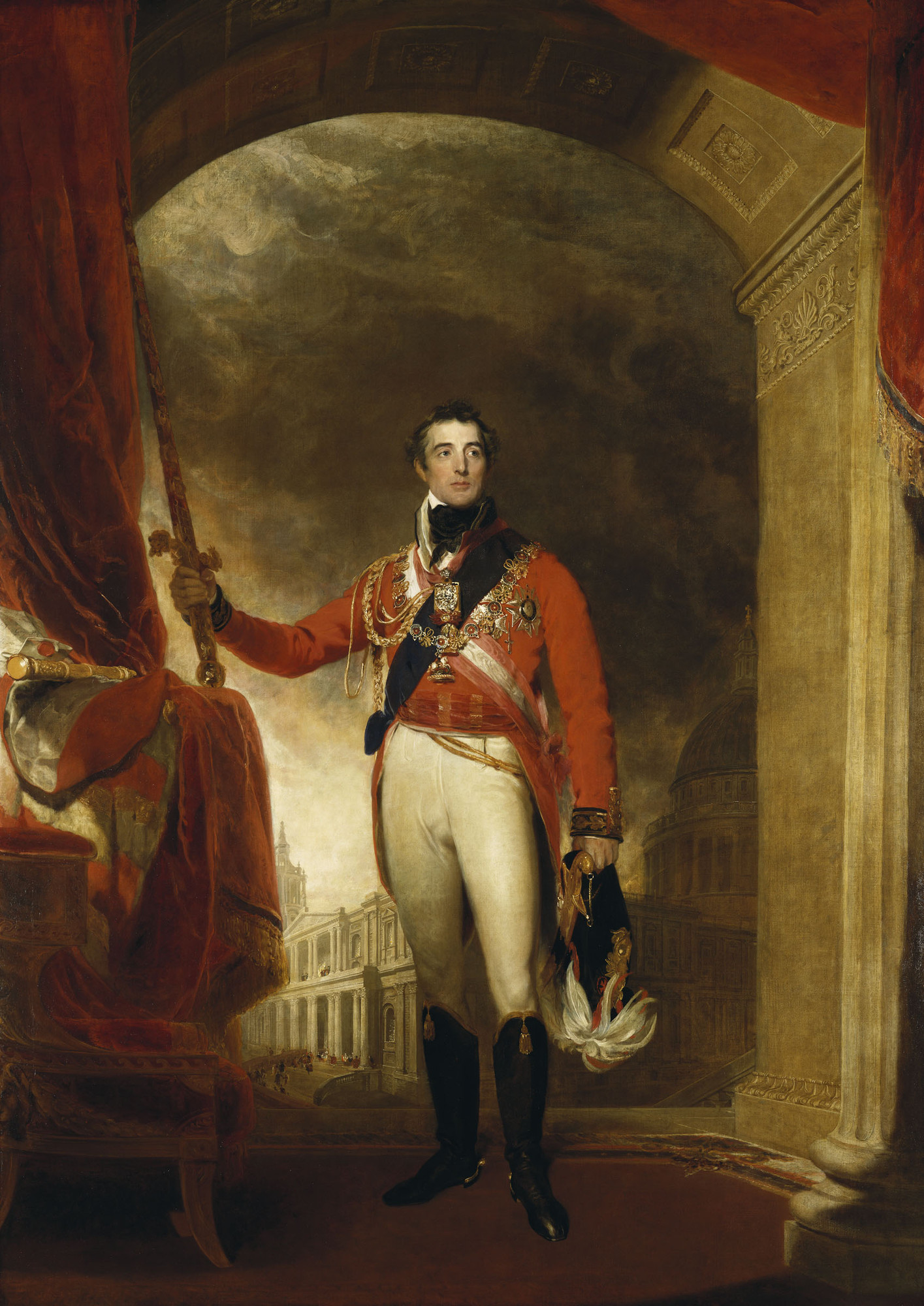
Portrait of the Duke of Wellington by Thomas Lawrence, 1815

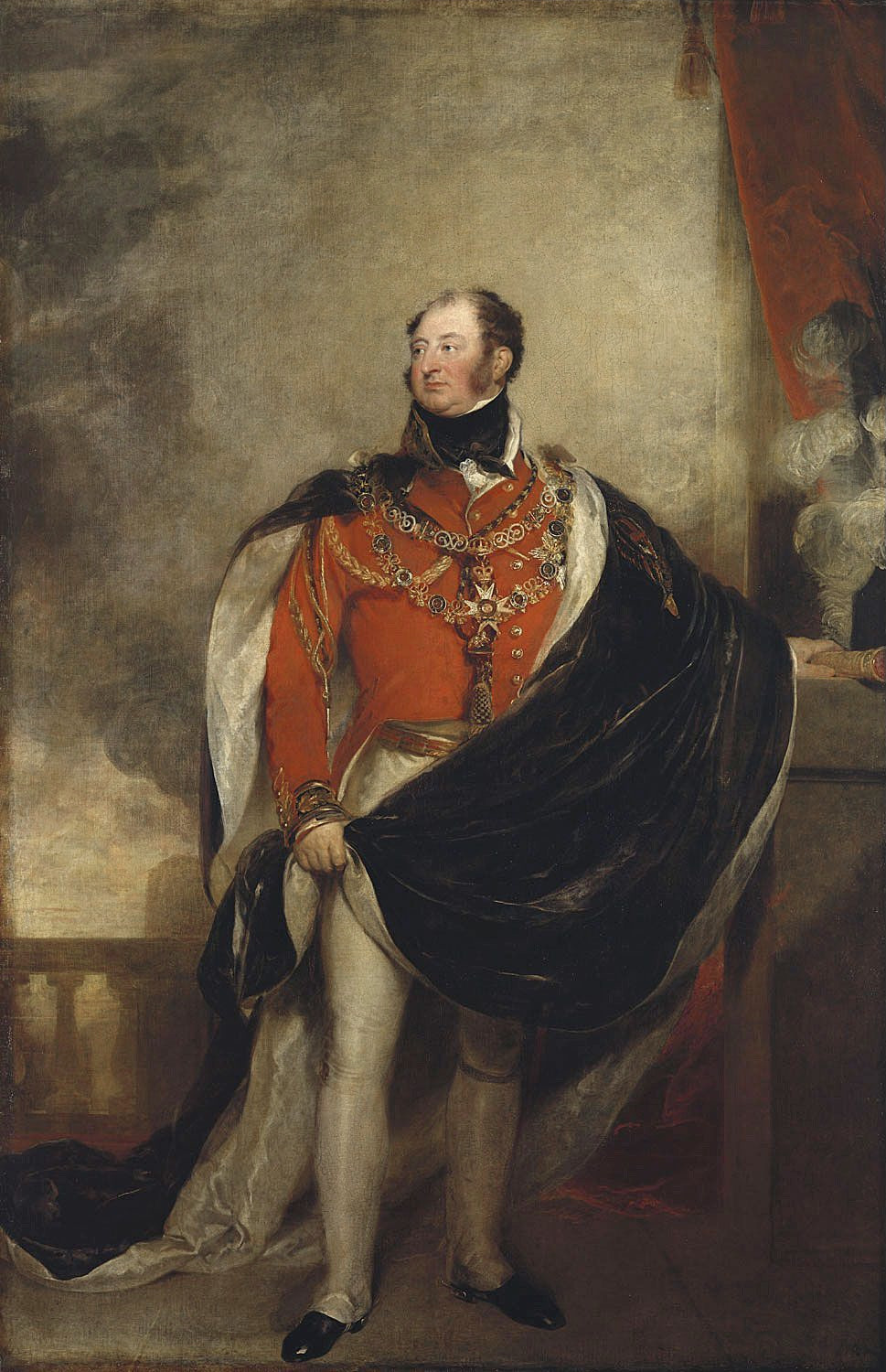
Portrait of the Duke of York by Lawrence, 1816. York was Commander in Chief of the British Army during the Napoleonic Wars.

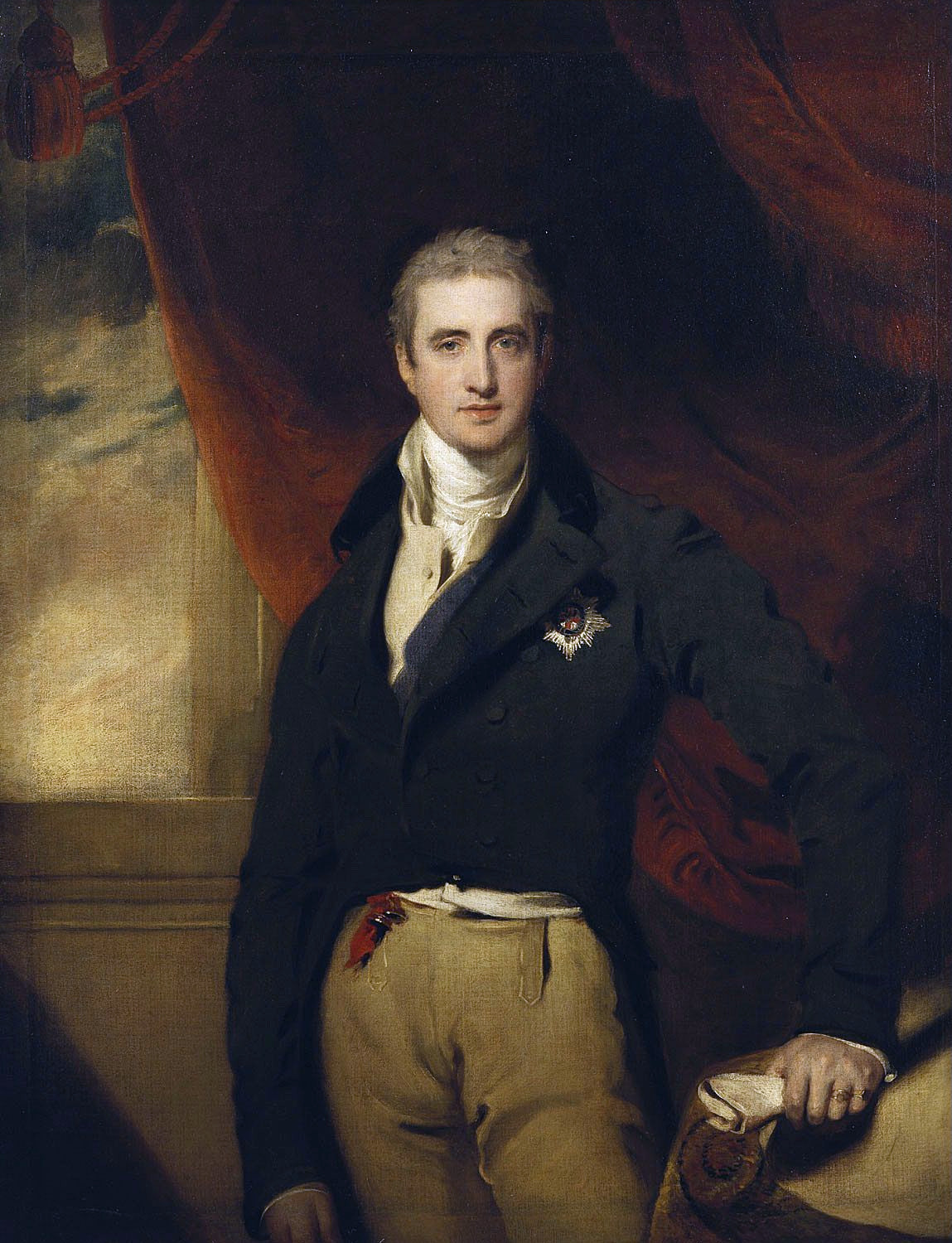
Lord Castlereagh by Thomas Lawrence, 1817. Castlereagh was the British Foreign Secretary

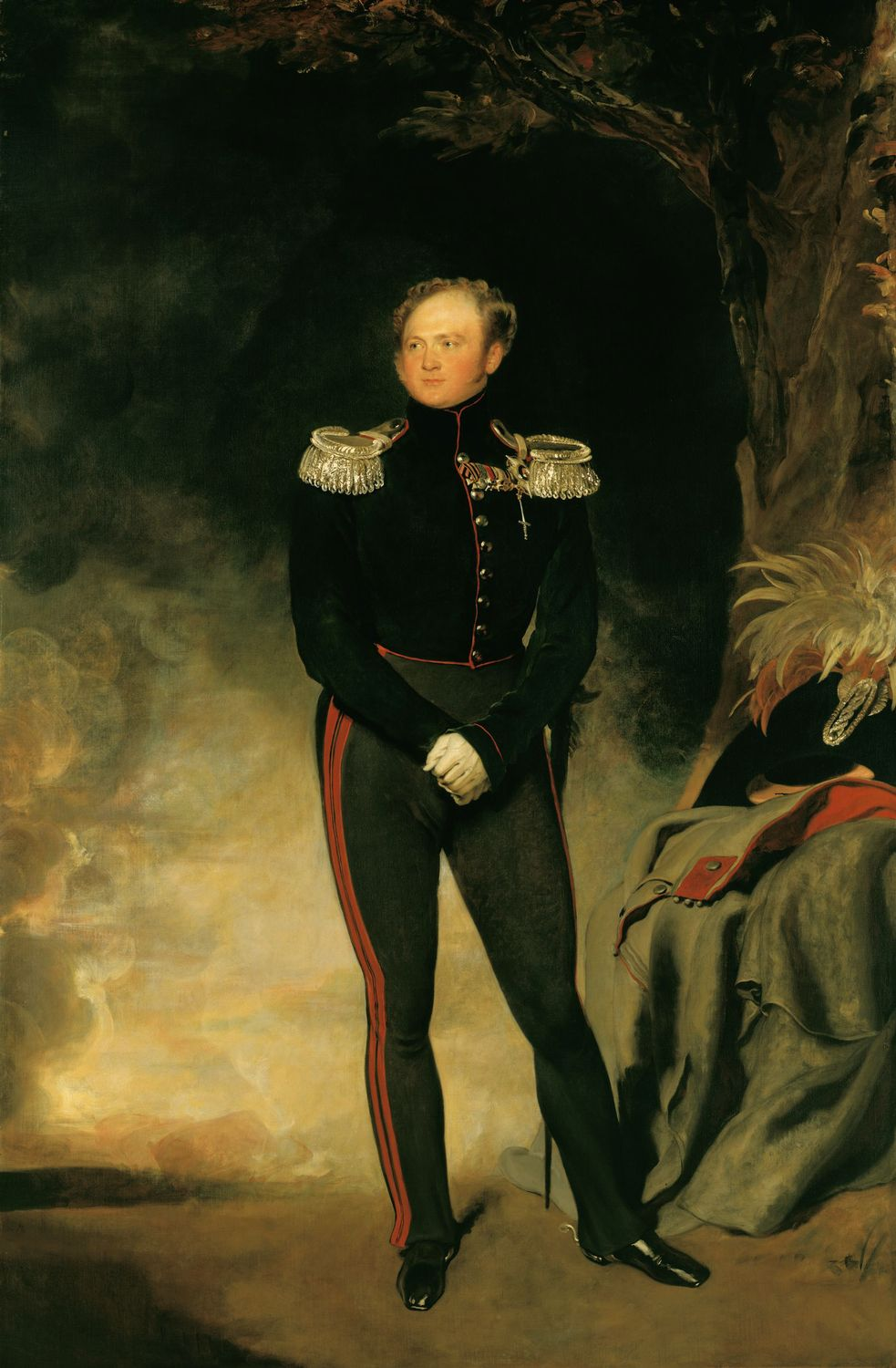
Portrait of Alexander I of Russia by Thomas Lawrence, 1818

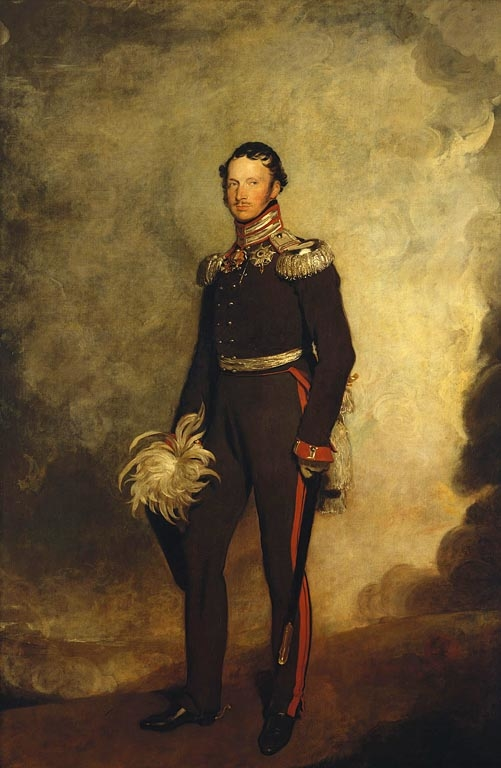
Portrait of Frederick William III of Prussia by Thomas Lawrence, 1818

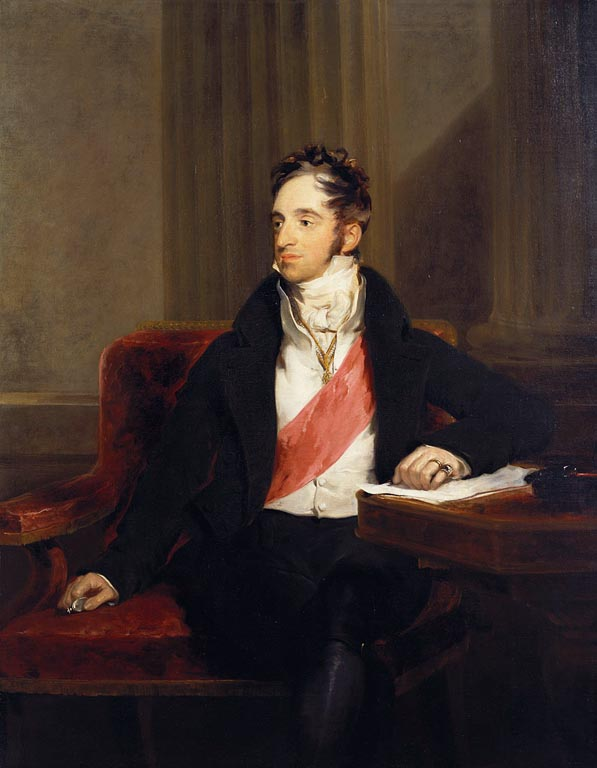
Portrait of Count Nesselrode by Thomas Lawrence, 1818

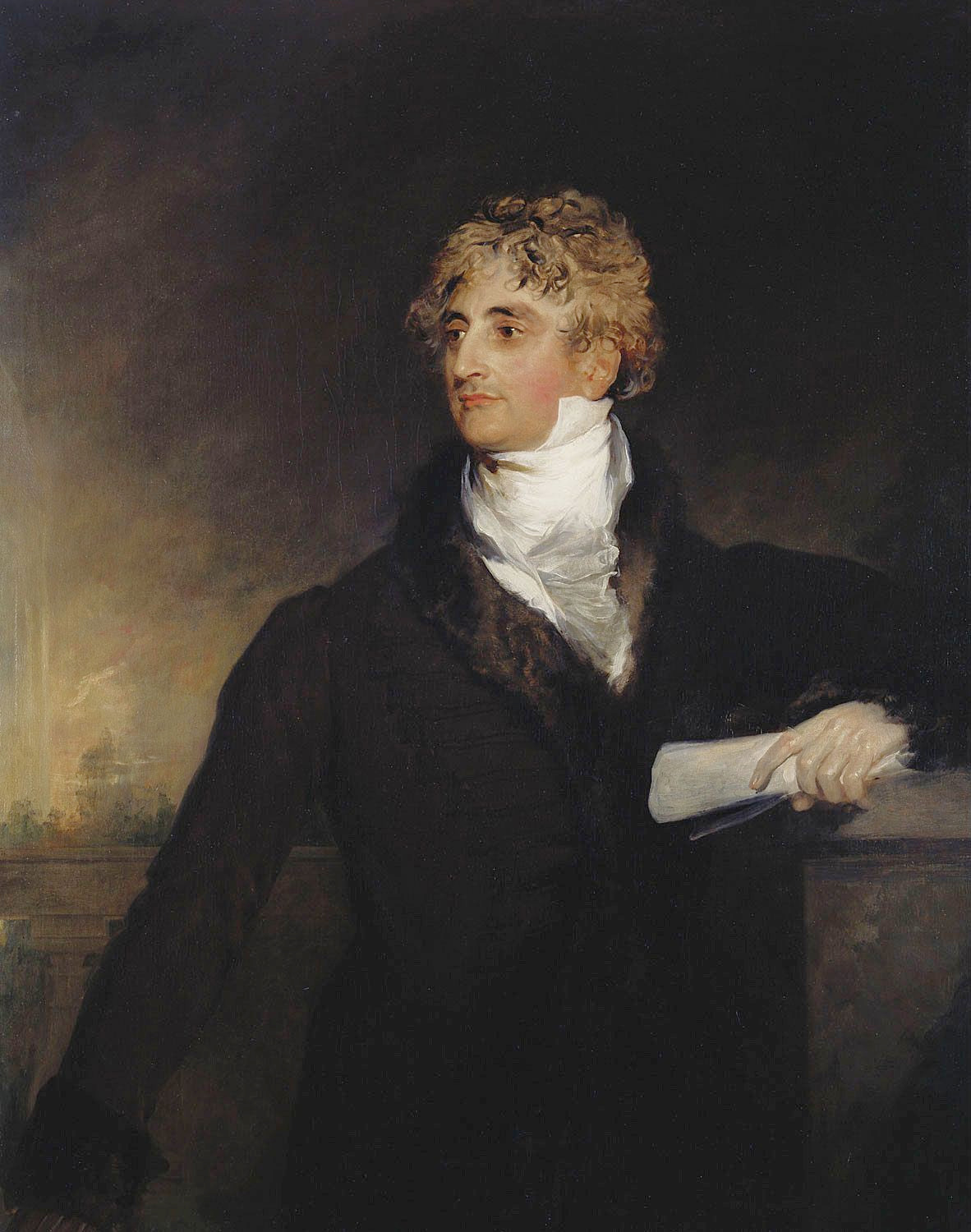
Portrait of the Duke of Richelieu by Thomas Lawrence, 1818

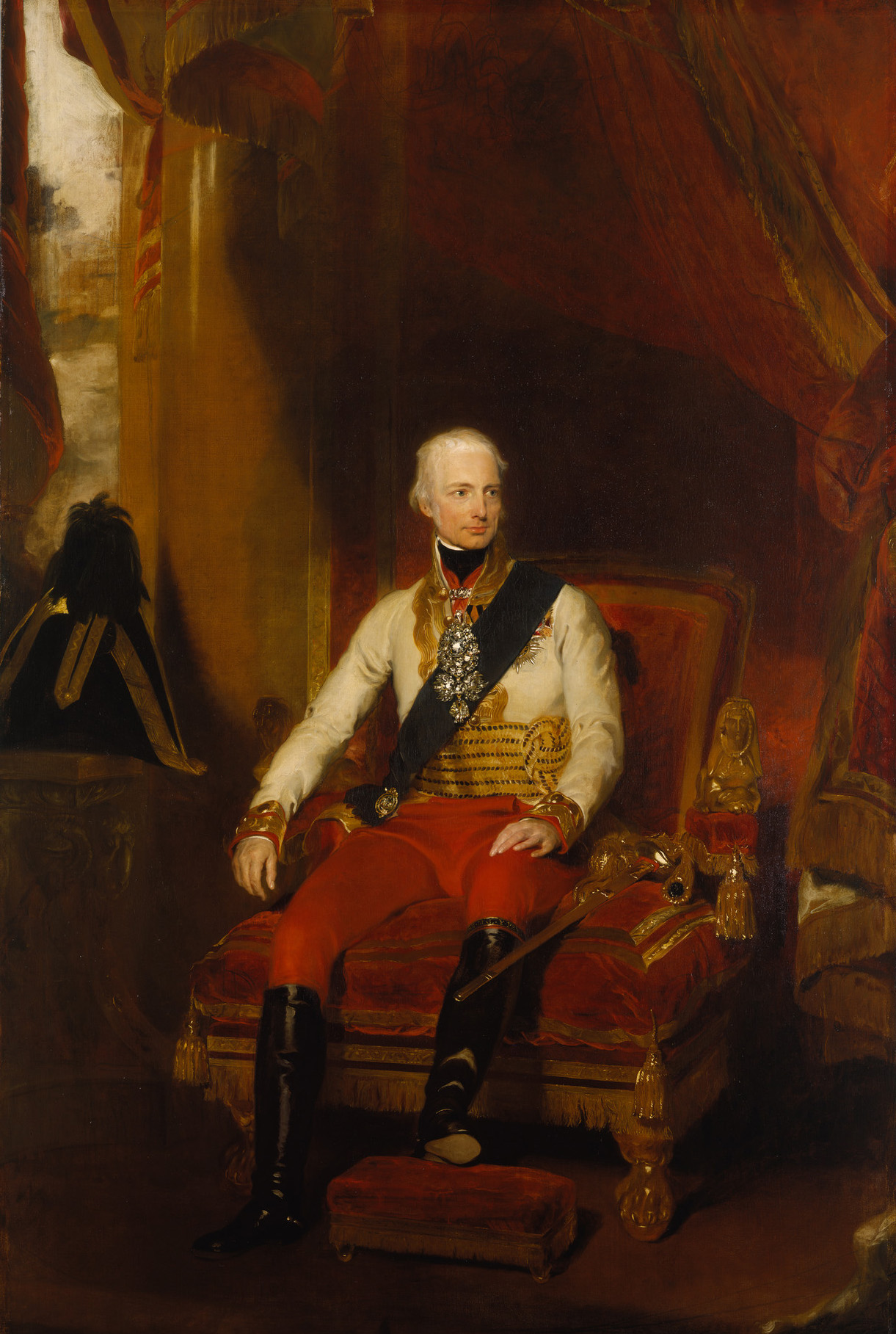
Portrait of Francis I of Austria by Thomas Lawrence, 1819

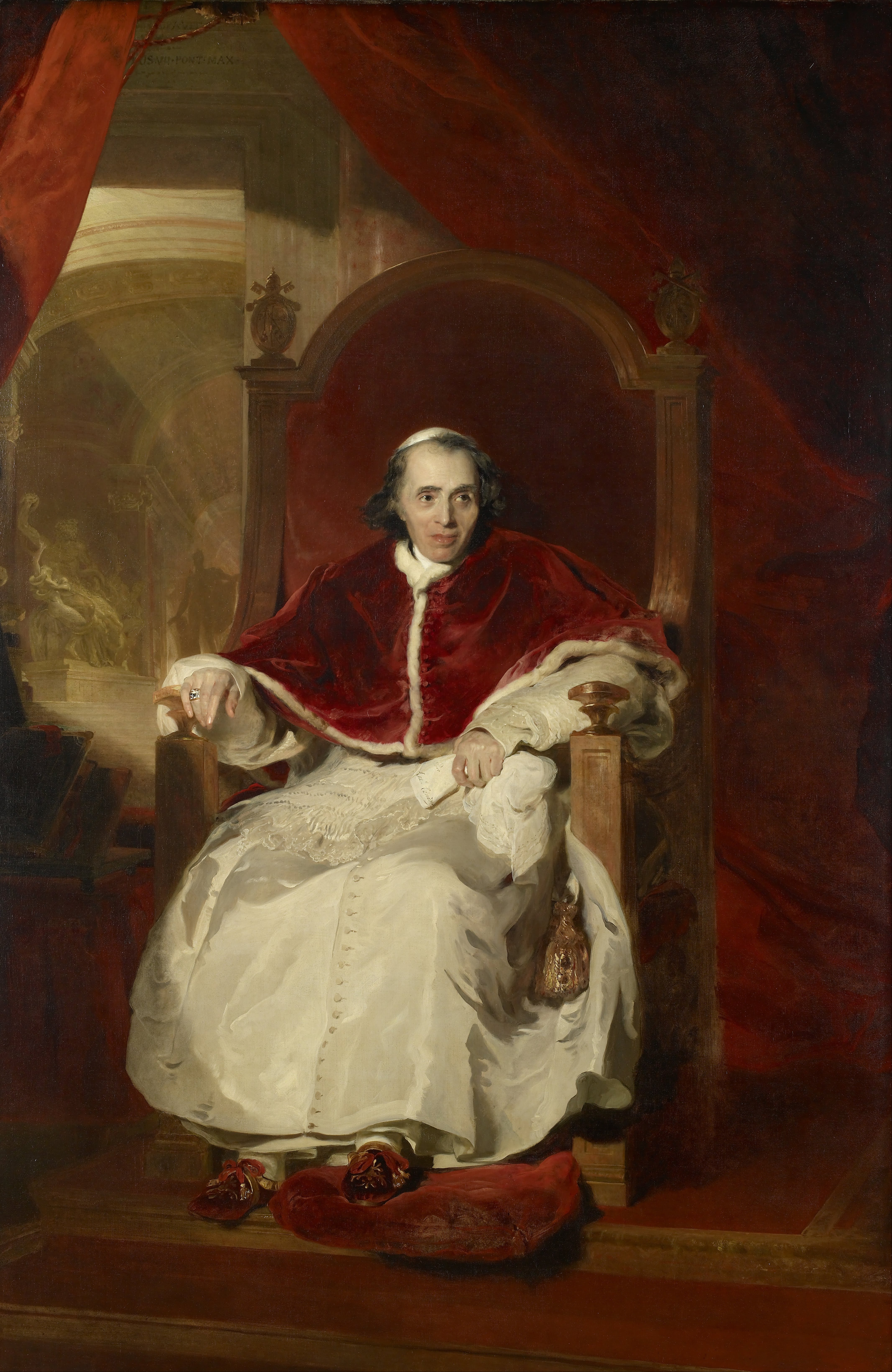
Portrait of Pope Pius VII by Thomas Lawrence, 1819

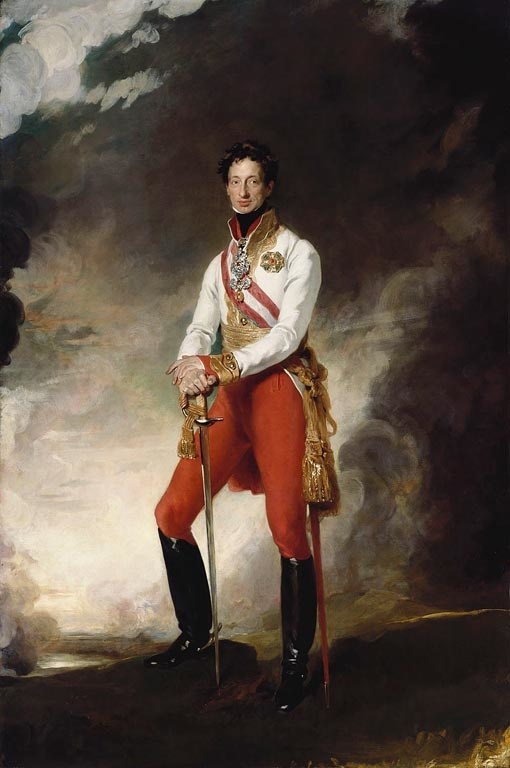
Portrait of Archduke Charles by Thomas Lawrence, 1819

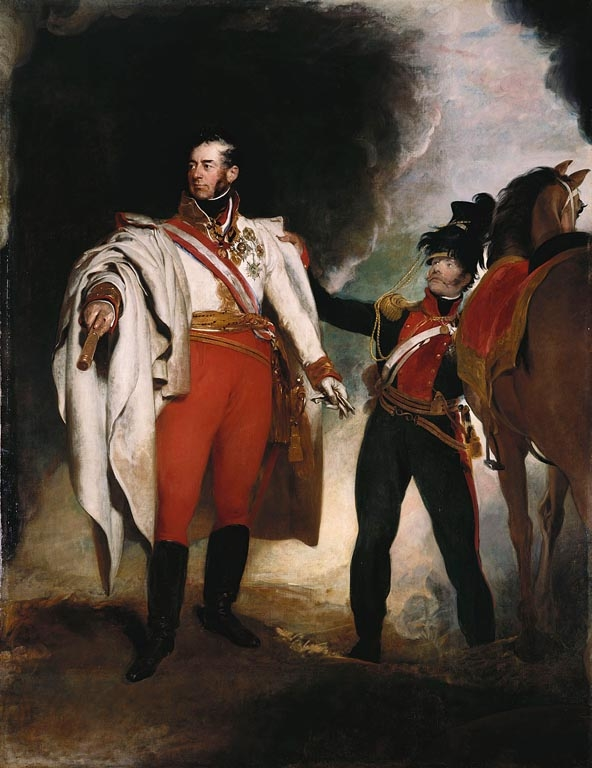
Portrait of Prince Schwarzenberg by Thomas Lawrence, 1819

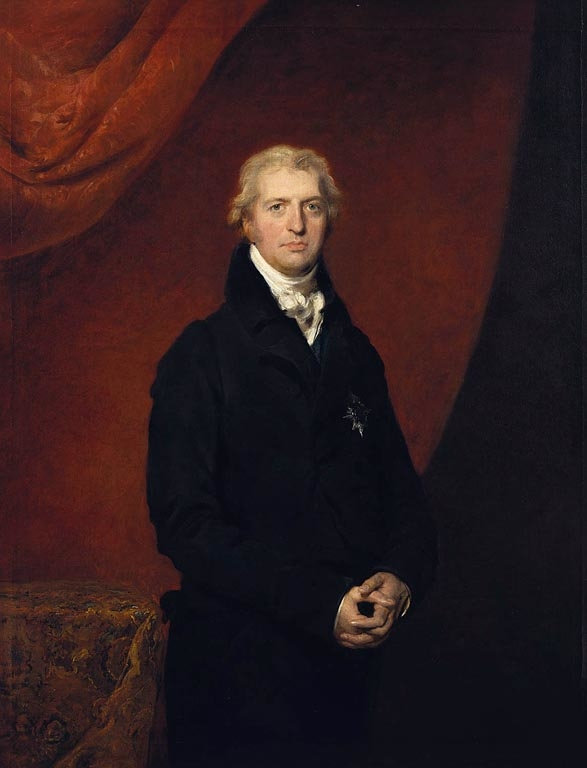
Portrait of Lord Liverpool by Thomas Lawrence, 1820

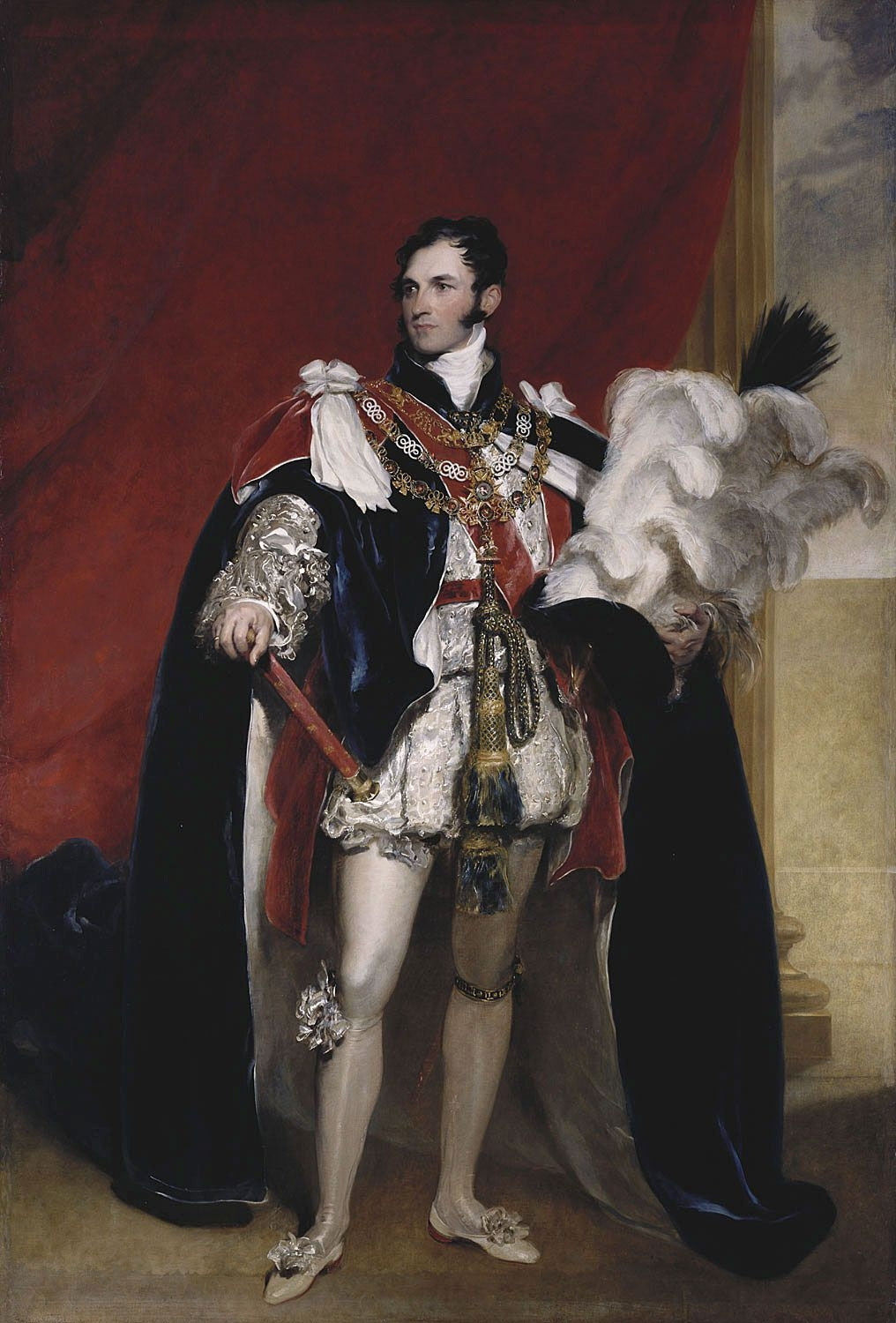
Portrait of Prince Leopold by Thomas Lawrence, 1821

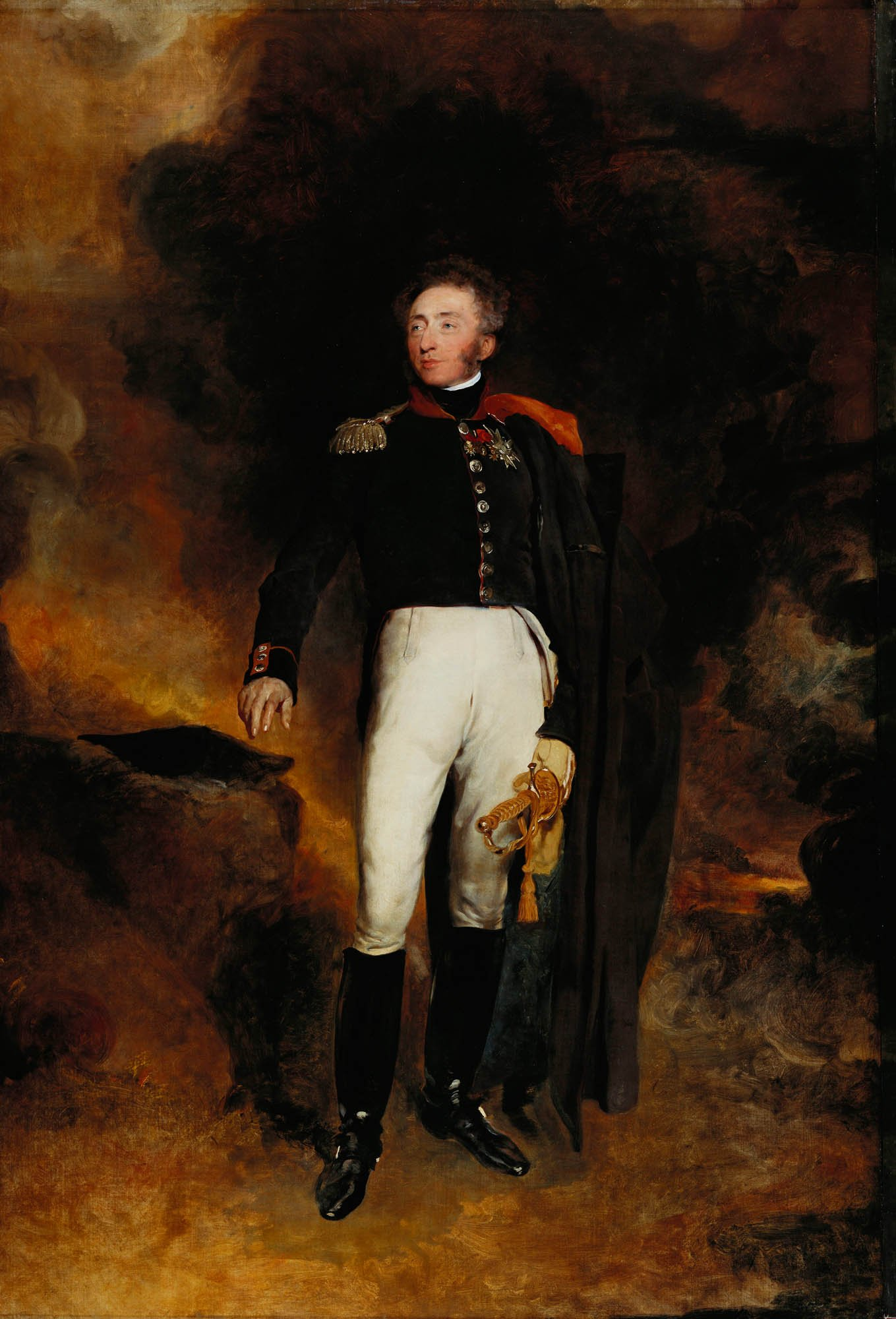
Portrait of the Duke of Angoulême by Thomas Lawrence, 1825

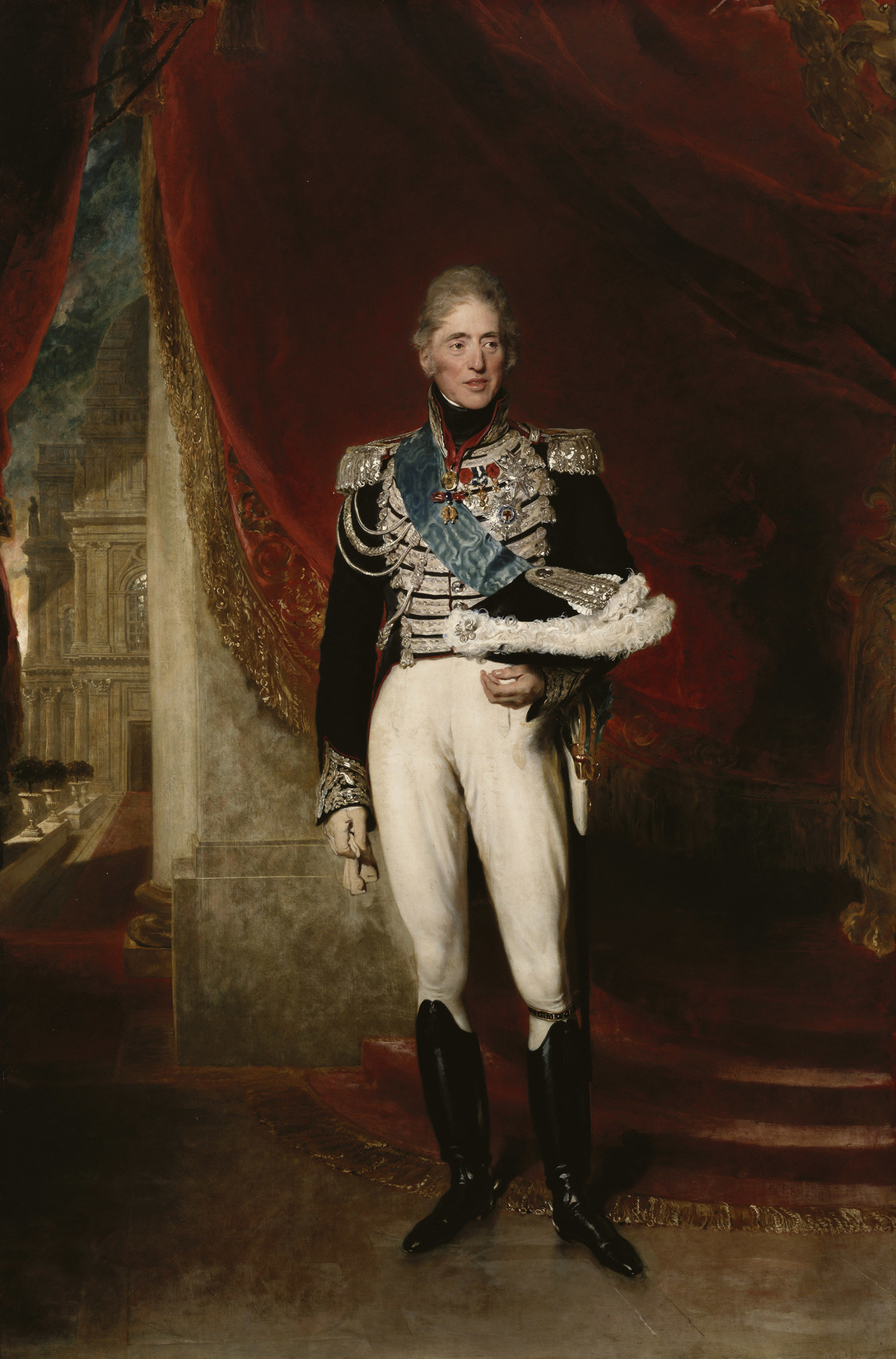
Portrait of Charles X by Thomas Lawrence, 1825

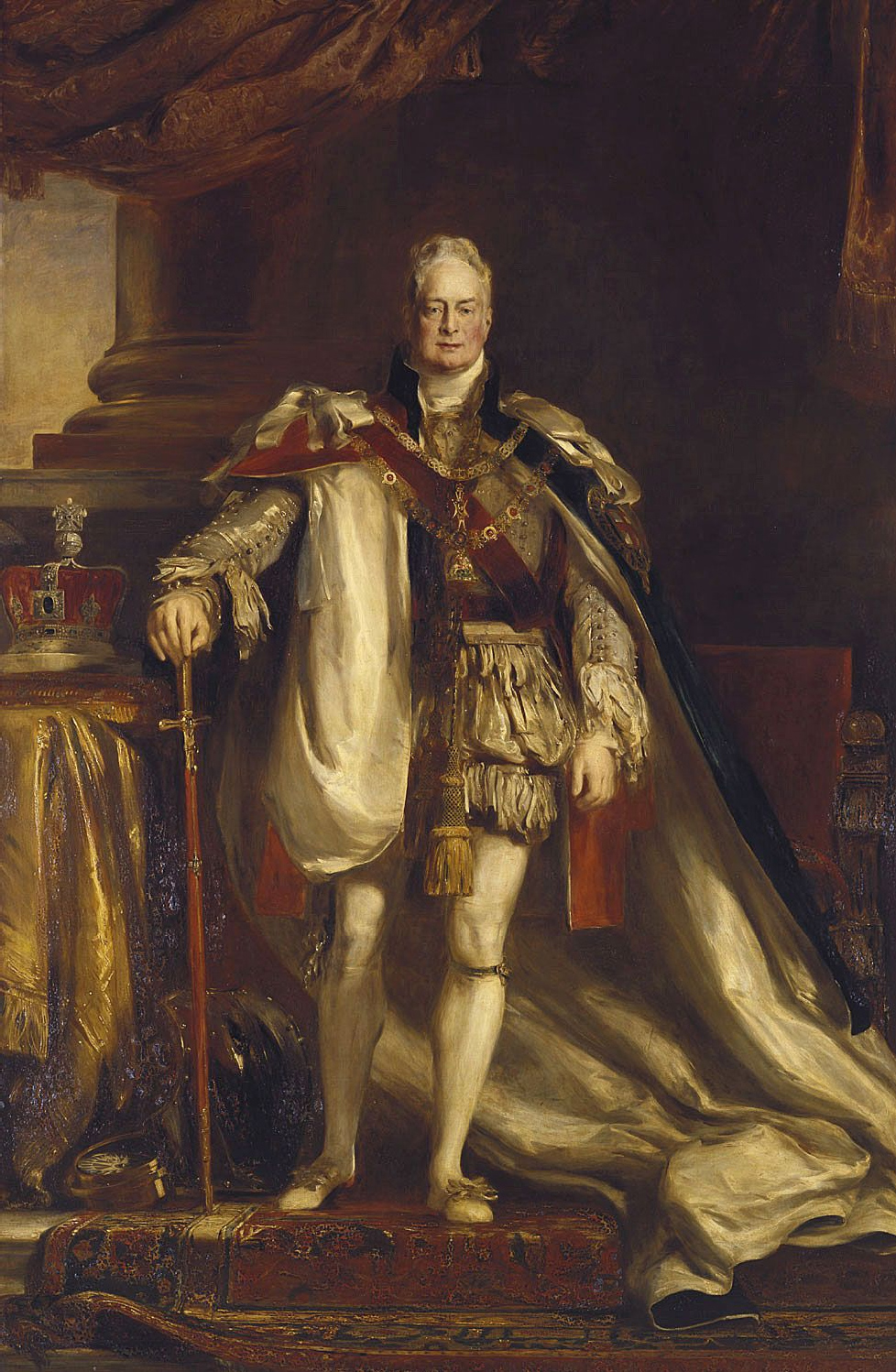
Portrait of William IV by David Wilkie, 1832

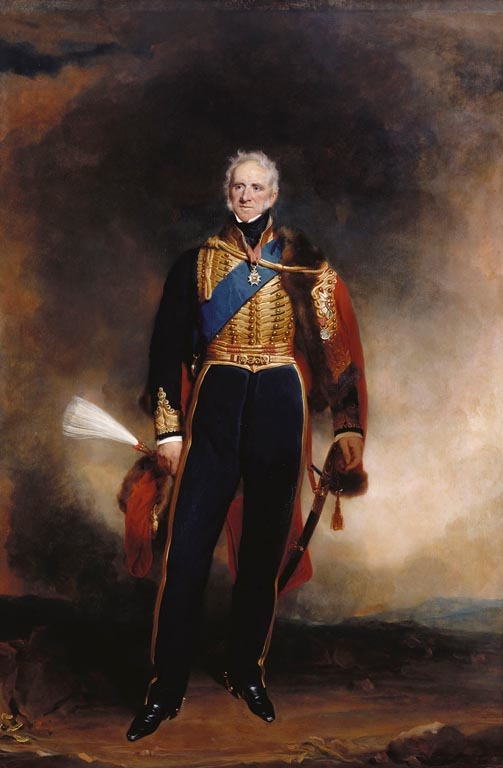
Portrait of the Marquess of Anglesey by Martin Archer Shee, 1836

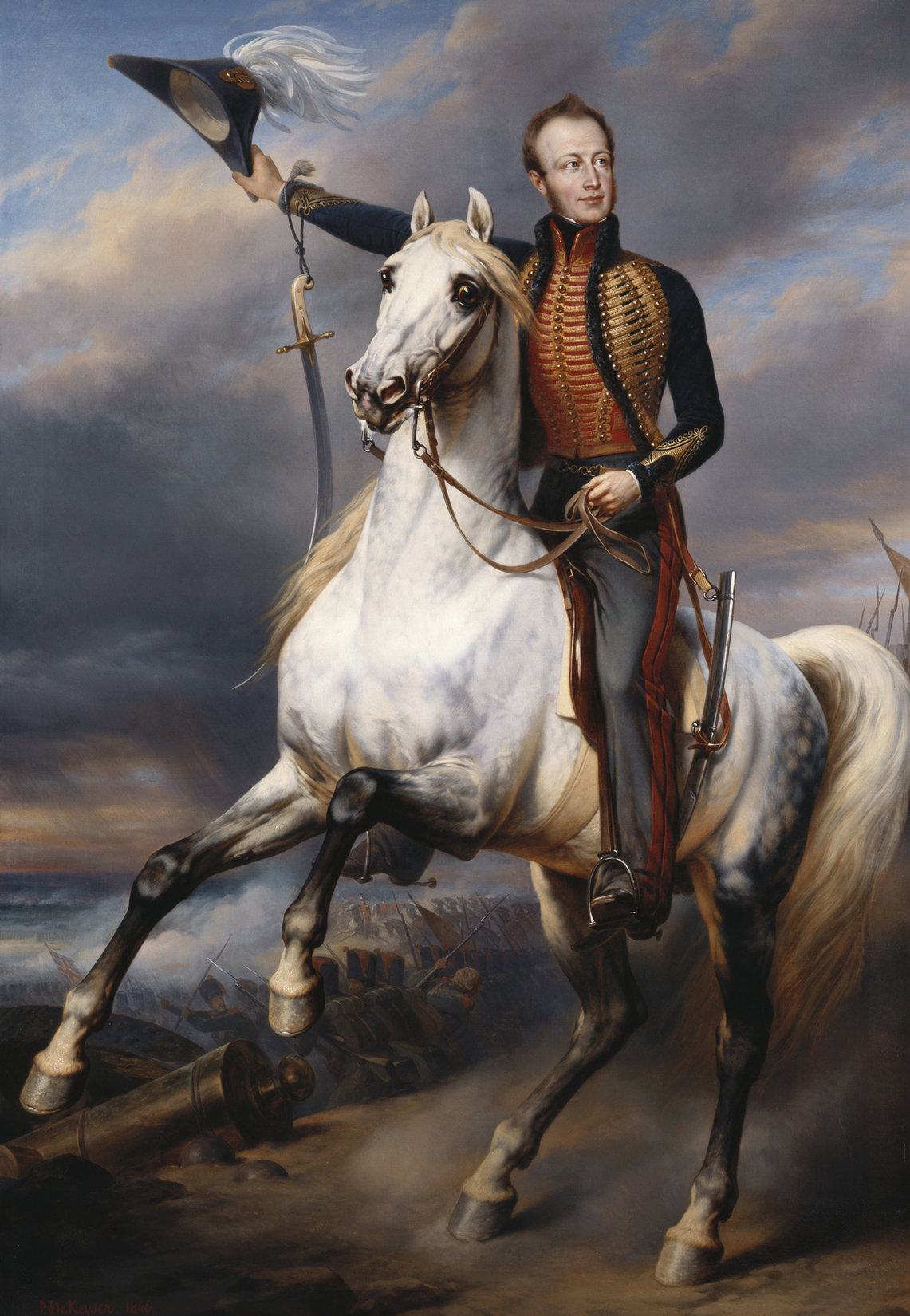
William, Prince of Orange by Nicaise de Keyser, 1846
