= 1814 visit by coalition sovereigns to England =

Event in 1814

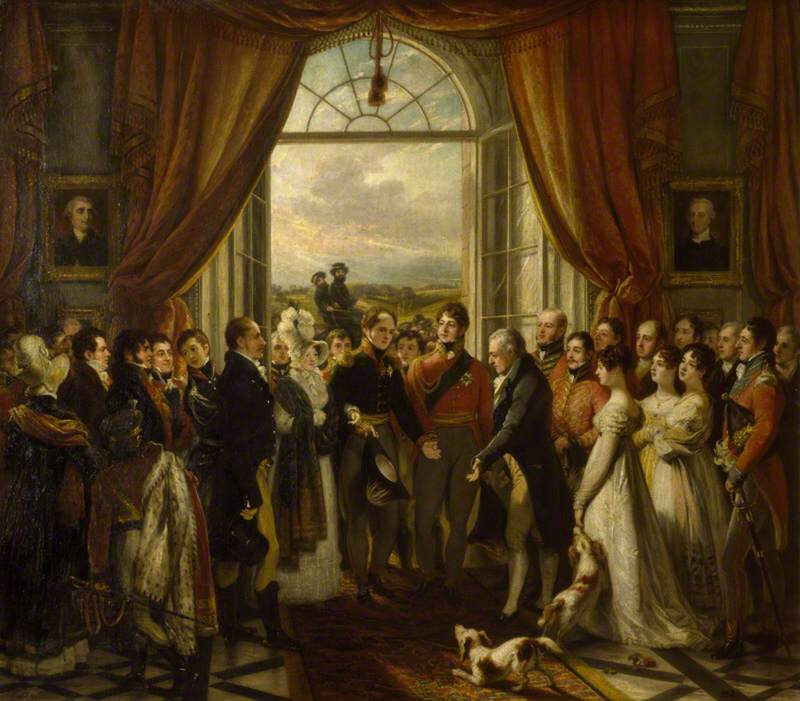
The Allied Sovereigns at Petworth by Thomas Phillips, 1817

The sovereigns and generals of the Coalition Allies – comprising Austria, Prussia, Russia, Sweden, the United Kingdom, and a number of German States – took part in a state visit and various peace celebrations in London in June 1814 to celebrate the peace following the defeat of France and abdication of Napoleon Bonaparte in April 1814. It is also occasionally known as the Congress of London, although most diplomatic discussions were deferred until the Congress of Vienna later that year.

== Official dignitaries ==
The visitors in Oxford by George Jones, 1815

A number of nobles, sovereigns and dignitaries attended the celebrations. These included Tsar Alexander of Russia (who stayed with his sister, the Grand Duchess of Oldenburg at the Pulteney Hotel in Piccadilly); King Frederick William III of Prussia, with his sons Crown Prince Frederick William and Prince Wilhelm; Prince Metternich, Chancellor of the Austrian Empire; Field Marshal Blücher, Prince Hardenberg, the Chancellor of Prussia; General Yorck; General Bülow, Count Barclay de Tolly and Count Matvei Platov.

== Events ==
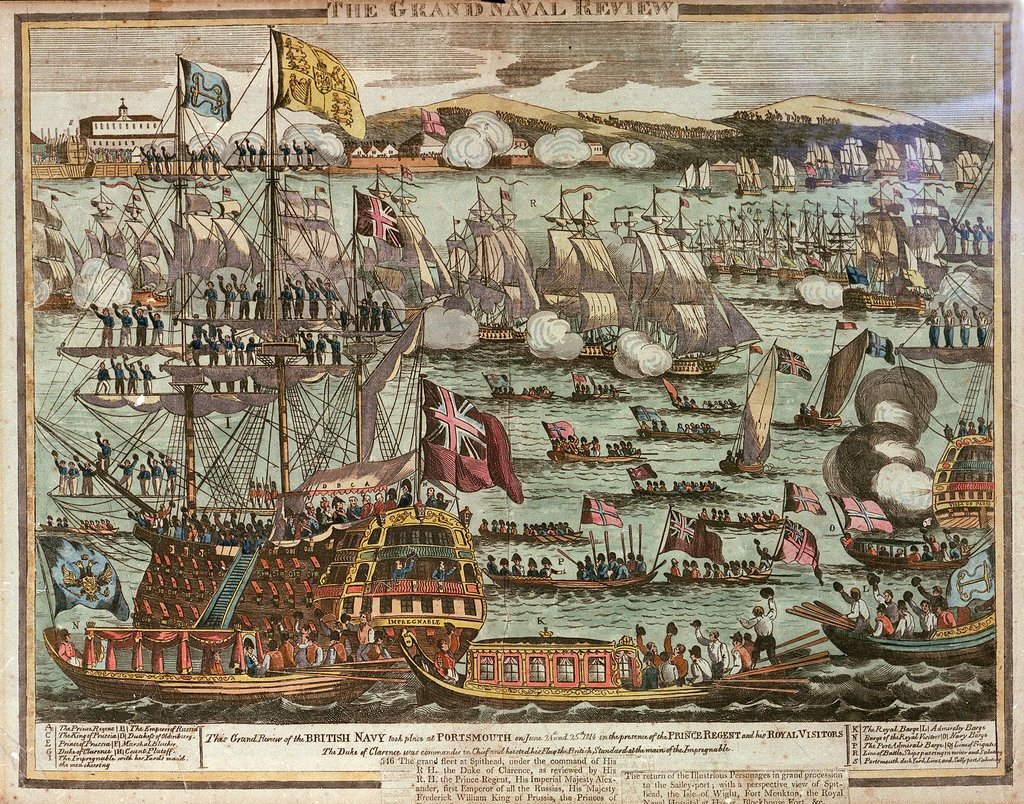
The Grand Naval Review, Spithead, 24–25 June 1814

The King of Prussia and the Emperor of Russia boarded the Duke of Clarence's flagship the Impregnable in Boulogne on 6 June 1814 and crossed to Dover, where they were officially welcomed, with a guard of honour provided by the soldiers of the famous Light Division - the 43rd, 52nd and 95th Regiments. Prince Metternich and others of the party had arrived previously. They arrived in London on the afternoon of 7 June, travelling privately to avoid a public spectacle. Alexander lodged at the Pulteney Hotel in Piccadilly, Frederick William at Clarence House and von Blücher at Carlton House.

Various entertainments, parades and ceremonies were undertaken, including Tsar Alexander's levee on 8 June, at the house of the Duke of Cumberland, followed by the Queen's court at the palace in the evening. On 9 June, court was held at Carlton House, followed by a ceremony where the Emperor of Russia, the Earl of Liverpool, and Viscount Castlereagh were admitted as Knights of the Order of the Garter.

The 10 June saw the monarchs attend the races at Ascot. On 12 June, the monarchs went on the River Thames in a grand procession of boats to the Royal Arsenal at Woolwich, where a demonstration of artillery included the firimg of Congreve rockets. On 14 June, they visited Oxford, where Tsar Alexander, King Frederick William and Marshal Blücher received honorary degrees A City of London banquet was held at the Guildhall on 18 June. One event alone cost £25,000.

On 20 June, The London Victory Parade of 1814 (a British victory parade), took place at Hyde Park in London. Over 15,000 troops attended the parade, most of them British. Other groups in attendance included Cossacks and other small continental contingents.

On 22 June they left London to attend a naval review at Portsmouth with the Prince Regent. The party then stayed at Arundel Castle, and visited the Royal Pavilion at Brighton before travelling on to Dover where they embarked for the Continent.

== Aftermath ==
Celebrations continued in Britain throughout the summer, centred on the Duke of Wellington who had arrived from Spain during the final day of the visit. This culminated in a huge fête given at Carlton House in Wellington's honour by the Prince Regent on 21 July. The scale of it was reminiscent of the extravagant event at Carlton House at which he marked the beginning of the Regency in 1811. In the autumn many of the dignitaries who had visited England began to gather in Vienna for the planned major Congress to settle Europe's future borders.

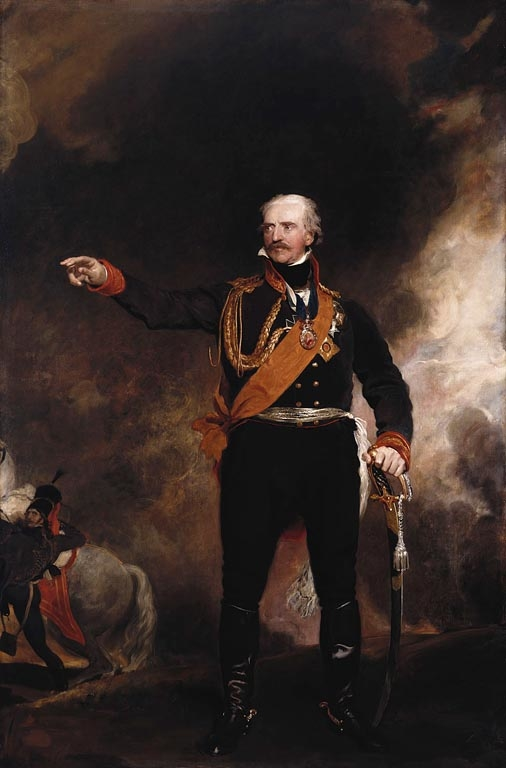
Portrait of Marshal Blücher by Thomas Lawrence, 1814, painted while he was in London.

Many of those who took part in the visit were painted by Thomas Lawrence, either at the time or later, as part of a large-scale commission by the Prince Regent. They now hang in the Waterloo Chamber at Windsor Castle. Separately Thomas Phillips produced the painting The Allied Sovereigns at Petworth featuring several of the leaders in a group scene.

Two streets in the developing suburb of Bayswater, then a little to the west of London, were named Moscow Road and St. Petersburgh Place in honour of the Tsar following the visit.

== See also ==
- St. Catherine's Down § Hoy monument
- Napoleonic Wars
