= Congress of Aix-la-Chapelle (1818) =

Diplomatic conference

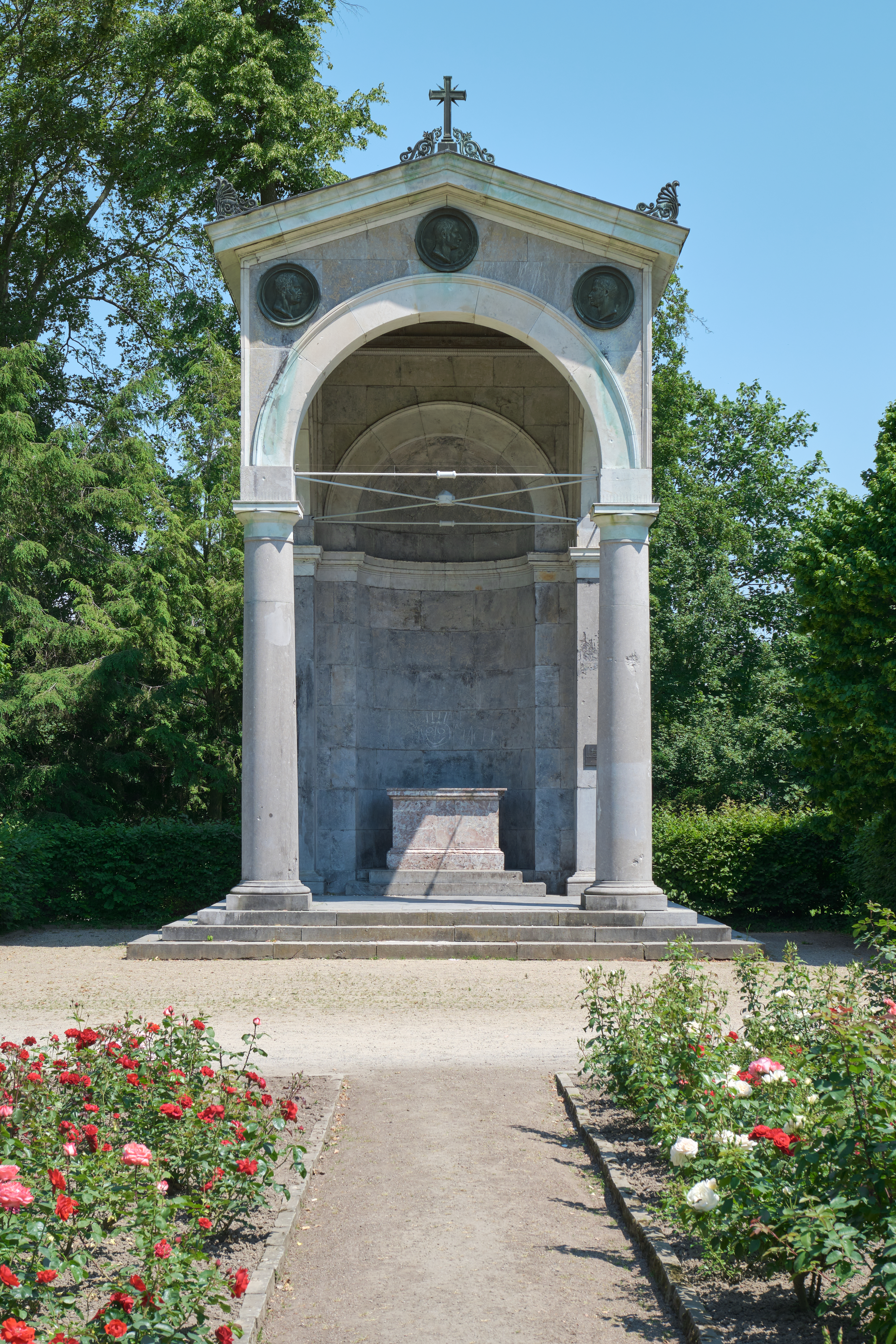
Congress memorial in Aachen

The Congress of Aix-la-Chapelle, held in the autumn of 1818, was a high-level diplomatic meeting of France and the four allied powers Britain, Austria, Prussia and Russia, which had defeated it in 1814. The purpose was to decide the withdrawal of the army of occupation from France and renegotiate the reparations it owed. It produced an amicable settlement, whereby France refinanced its reparations debt; the Allies in a few weeks withdrew all of their troops.

It was part of the series of conferences known as the Concert of Europe.

The occupation was formally terminated at the conference on 30 September 1818; by 30 November evacuation was complete. The French representative Duc de Richelieu succeeded in having France admitted as a full discussion partner in the European congress system and France's position as a European power was restored.

Financially, France was originally obligated to pay 700 million francs, in installments every four months for five years (1815 Treaty of Paris). When the Congress met, Paris had discharged its obligations punctually. 332 million remained; France offered to pay the sum of 265 million. Of that, 100 million francs would be in the form of French bonds bearing interest, the rest in installments through to English banks.

The main achievement of the Congress was to definitively terminate the wars of 1792–1815. They closed out all claims against France, and accepted France as an equal and full member of the Concert of Four, which was now composed of Five Powers. To hedge their bets, the Four secretly renewed the Quadruple Alliance, but this was a formality of no consequence. The Four drifted apart year by year over questions dealing with Italy, South America, and Greece.

== Background ==
British Foreign Secretary Lord Castlereagh proposed in March 1818 that there should be a Congress later in the year. Metternich took up the proposal but was concerned to limit the number of countries attending. In particular he was alarmed by the prospect of Spain, whose growing closeness to Russia was clear, strengthening the hand of the Tsar. It was therefore agreed that only those five countries that had signed the 1815 Treaty of Paris would take part. This excluded a large number of participants who had previously taken part in the Congress of Vienna.

While several locations were considered for the Congress, Aix-la-Chapelle, which had been part of Prussia since 1815, was chosen due to its proximity to Wellington's Army of Occupation in northern France. Seventy years before the spa town had hosted the negotiations that led to the Treaty of Aix-la-Chapelle of 1748 that ended the War of the Austrian Succession.

Britain's Prince Regent commissioned the country's leading portrait painter Thomas Lawrence to travel to the Congress and paint the leading dignitaries. Amongst them was his Portrait of Francis I of Austria and Portrait of the Duke of Richelieu. These works became the core of the Waterloo Chamber at Windsor Castle. Another English artist George Dawe accompanied the Duke of Kent to Aix, where he painted many of the attendees. This led to a large-scale commission from the Tsar to produce portraits of the Russian generals of the Napoleonic Wars for the Military Gallery of the Winter Palace in Saint Petersburg.

== Delegates ==
The congress, convened in Aachen (Aix-la-Chapelle) on October 1, and its first session was attended by Emperor Alexander I of Russia, the Emperor Francis I of Austria, and King Frederick William III of Prussia. Britain was represented by Lord Castlereagh and the Duke of Wellington, Austria by Prince Metternich, Russia by Counts Capo d'Istria and Nesselrode, Prussia by Prince Hardenberg and Count Bernstorff. The Duc de Richelieu, by favour of the Allies, was present on behalf of France. Members of the Rothschild banking dynasty were also heavily involved in the congress. The British Secretary at War Lord Palmerston, a future Foreign Secretary, was also present.

== A treaty for withdrawal ==
The evacuation of France by Allied units was agreed to in principle at the first session, the consequent treaty being signed on 9 October. The immediate object of the conference being thus readily disposed of, the time of the congress was mainly occupied in discussing the form to be taken by the European alliance, and the "military measures", if any, to be adopted as a precaution against a fresh outburst on the part of France. The proposal of the Emperor Alexander I to establish a "universal union of guarantee" on the broad basis of the Holy Alliance, after much debate, broke down on the uncompromising opposition of Britain; and the main outcome of the congress was the signature, on 15 November, of two instruments:

1. a secret protocol confirming and renewing the Quadruple Alliance established by the treaties of Chaumont and Paris (of 20 November 1815) against France
2. a public "declaration" of the intention of the powers to maintain their intimate union, "strengthened by the ties of Christian brotherhood", of which the object was the preservation of peace on the basis of respect for treaties.

The secret protocol was communicated in confidence to Richelieu; to the declaration France was invited publicly to adhere.

== Diverse discussions ==
The Russian tsar proposed the formation of an entirely new alliance, to include all of the signatories from the Vienna treaties, to guarantee the sovereignty, territorial integrity, and preservation of the ruling governments of all members of this new coalition. The tsar further proposed an international army, with the Russian army as its nucleus, to provide the wherewithal to intervene in any country that needed it. Castlereagh, speaking for Britain saw this as a highly undesirable commitment to reactionary policies. He recoiled at the idea of Russian armies marching across Europe to put down popular uprisings. Furthermore, to admit all the smaller countries, would create intrigue and confusion. Britain refused to participate, so the idea was abandoned.

The delegates discussed several topics left unsettled in the hurried winding up of the Congress of Vienna, or which had arisen since. The most important were the methods to be adopted for the suppression of the Atlantic slave trade and the Barbary pirates. In neither case was any decision arrived at, owing mainly to the refusal of the other powers to agree with the British proposal for a reciprocal right of search on the high seas and to the objection of Britain to international action which would have involved the presence of a Russian squadron in the Mediterranean.

In matters of less importance the Congress was more unanimous. Thus on the urgent appeal of King Frederick VI of Denmark, Charles XIV of Sweden received a peremptory summons to carry out the terms of the Treaty of Kiel; the petition of the Prince-elector of Hesse to be recognized as king was unanimously rejected; and measures were taken to redress the grievances of the German mediatized princes.

The important outstanding questions in Germany, e.g. the Baden succession, were after consideration reserved for a further conference to be called at Frankfurt am Main, which occurred on 10 July 1819.

In addition to these a great variety of questions were considered, from the treatment of Napoleon in exile at Saint Helena to the grievances of the people of Monaco against their prince and the position of the Jews in Austria and Prussia. An attempt made to introduce the subject of the Spanish colonies was defeated by the opposition of Britain.

== Diplomacy ==
Certain vexatious questions of diplomatic etiquette were settled once and for all. (see diplomatic rank and Aix-la-Chapelle: Diplomatic Precedence of Ministers Resident)

== Assessment ==
The Congress, which broke up at the end of November, is of historical importance mainly as marking the highest point reached during the 19th century in the attempt to govern Europe by an international committee of the powers. The detailed study of its proceedings is highly instructive in revealing the almost insurmountable obstacles to any really effective international diplomatic system prior to the creation of the League of Nations after the First World War.

== Gallery of delegates ==
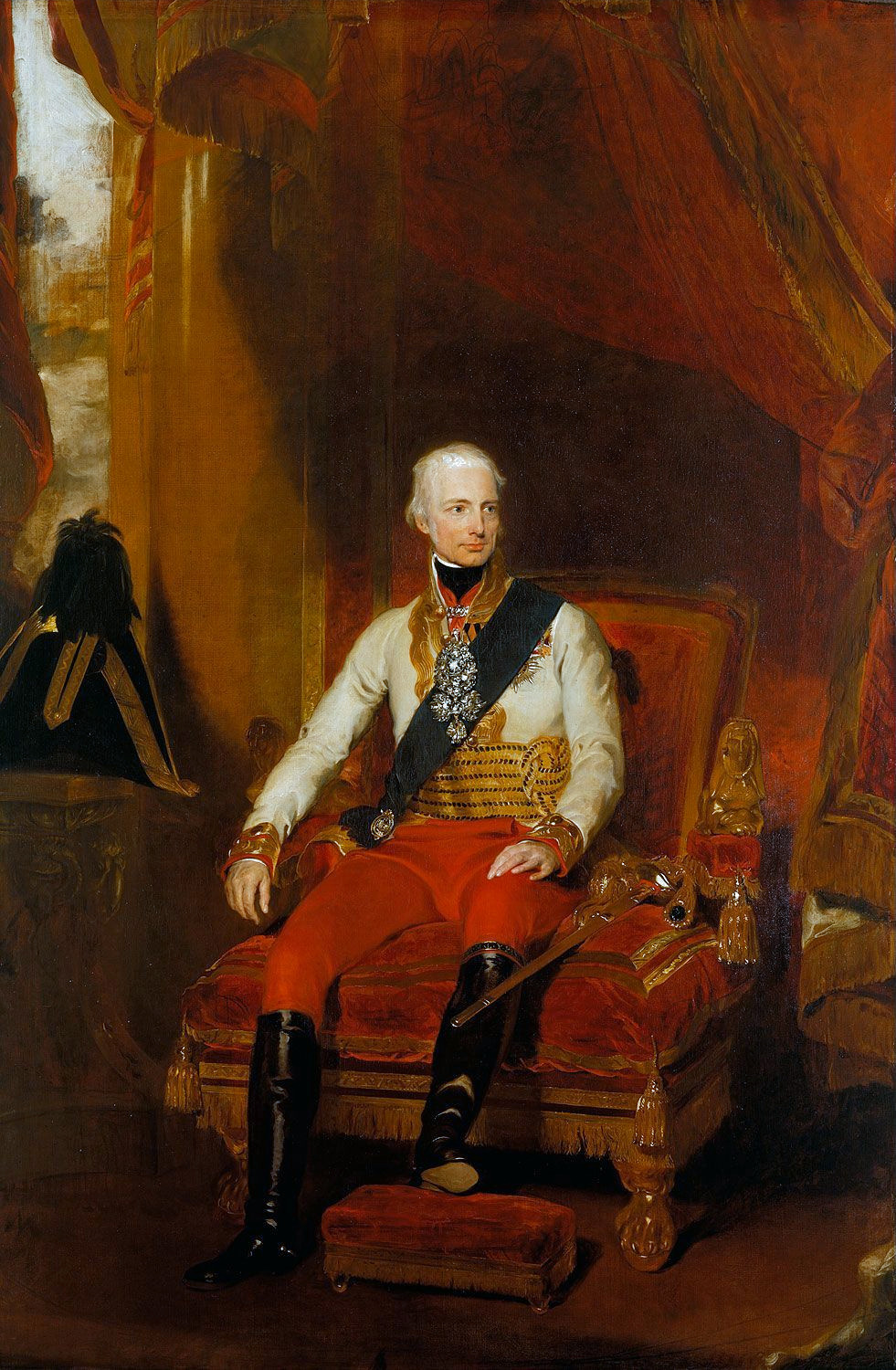
Francis I of Austria

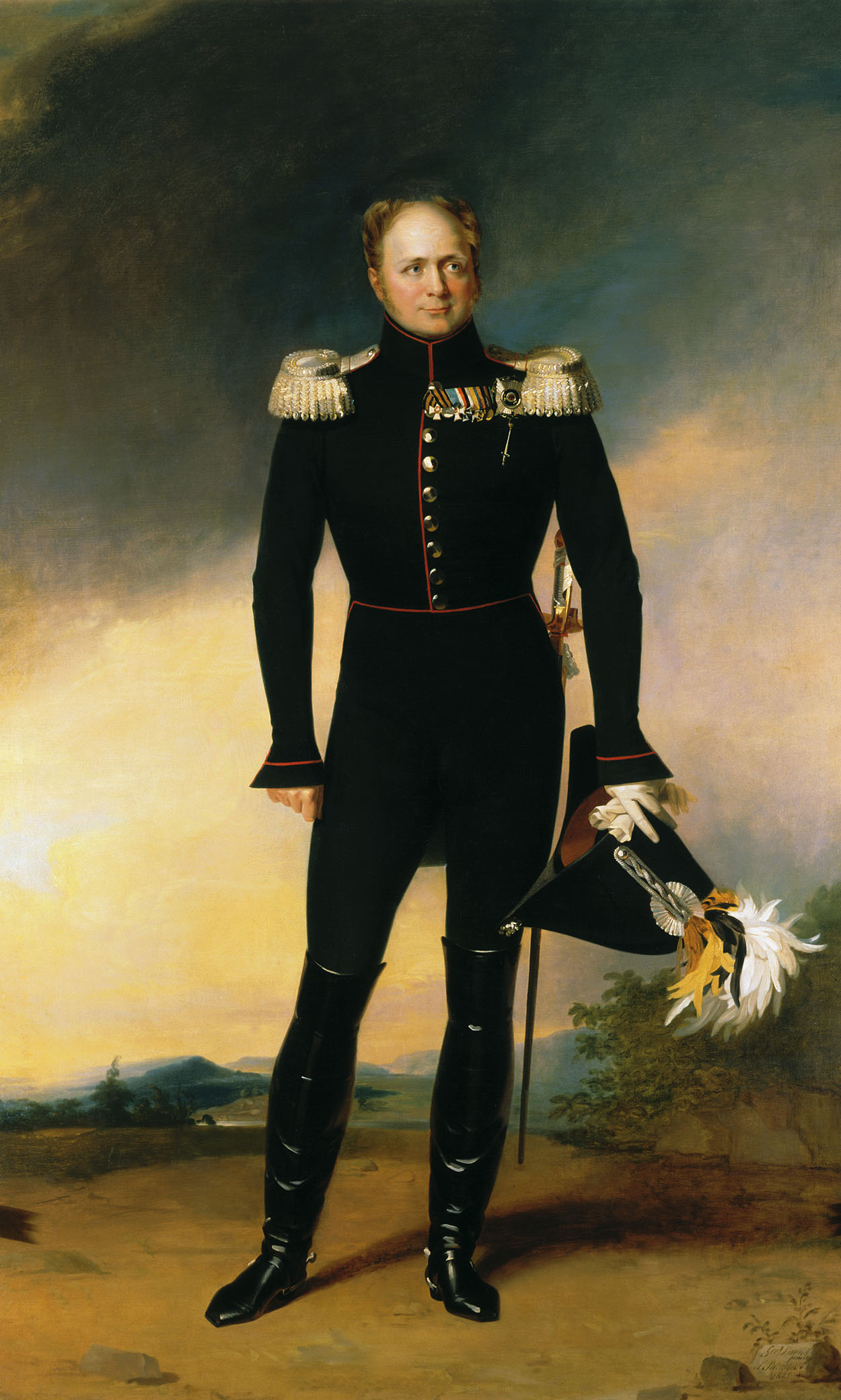
Alexander I of Russia

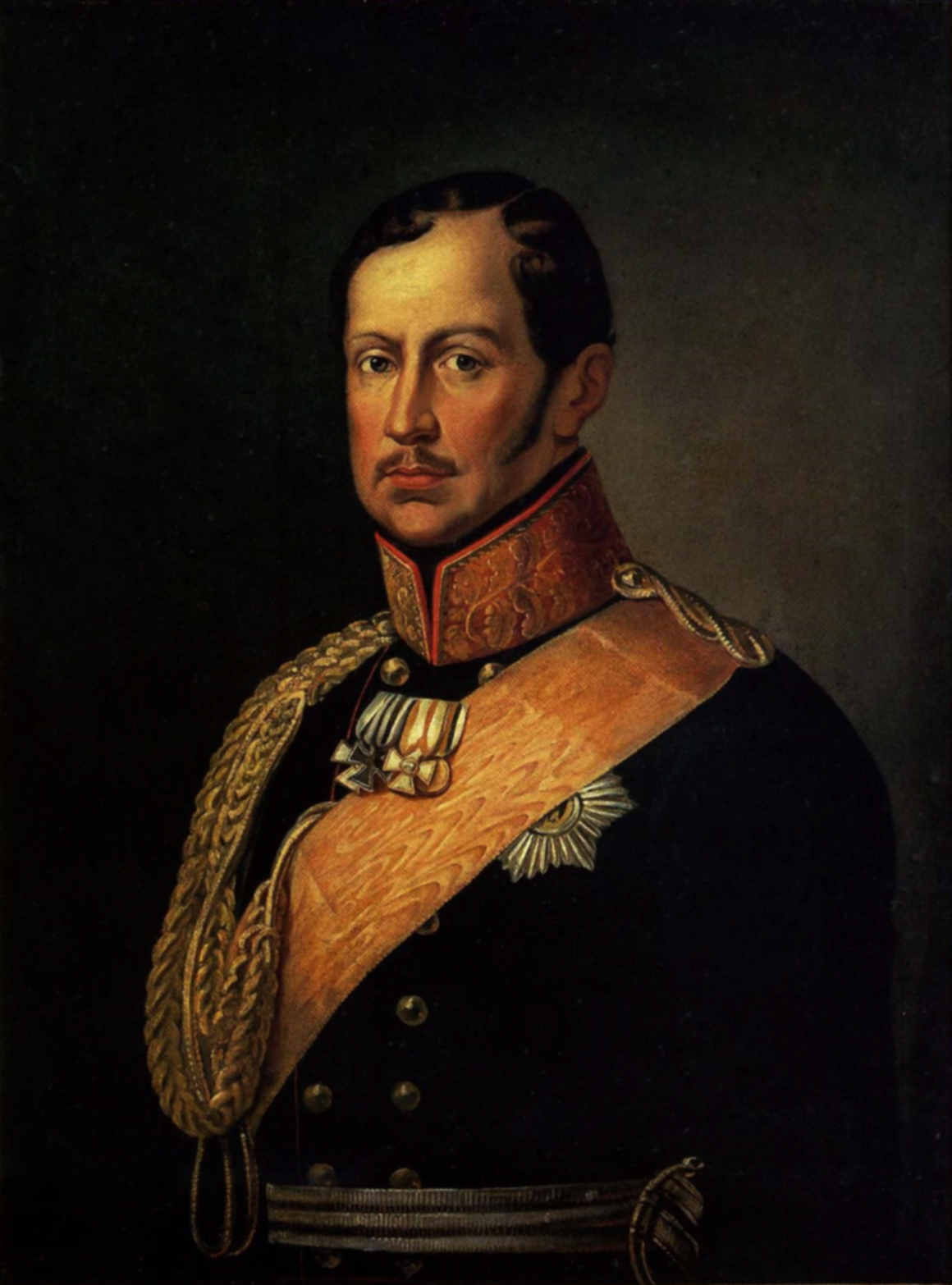
Frederick William III of Prussia

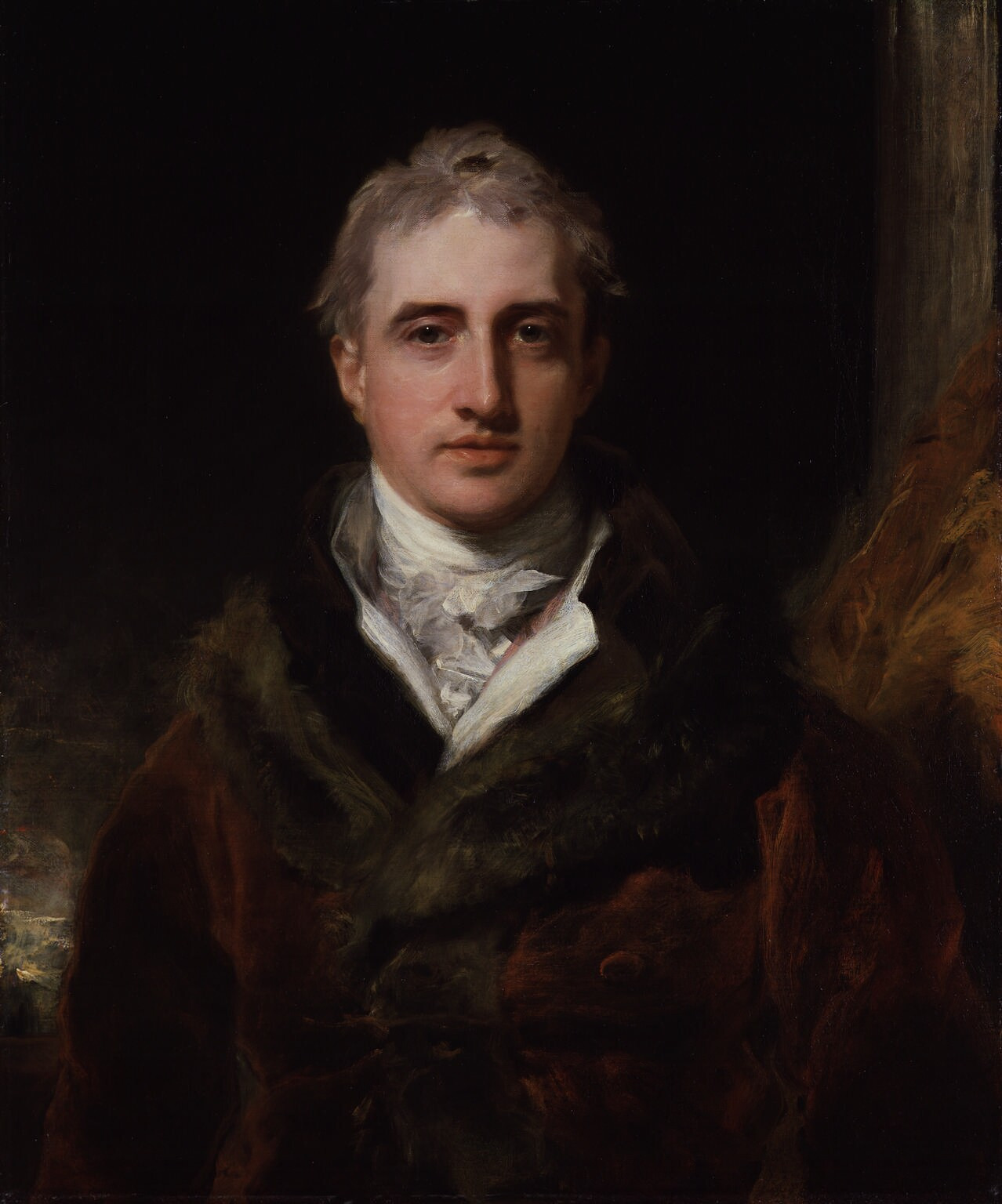
Lord Castlereagh

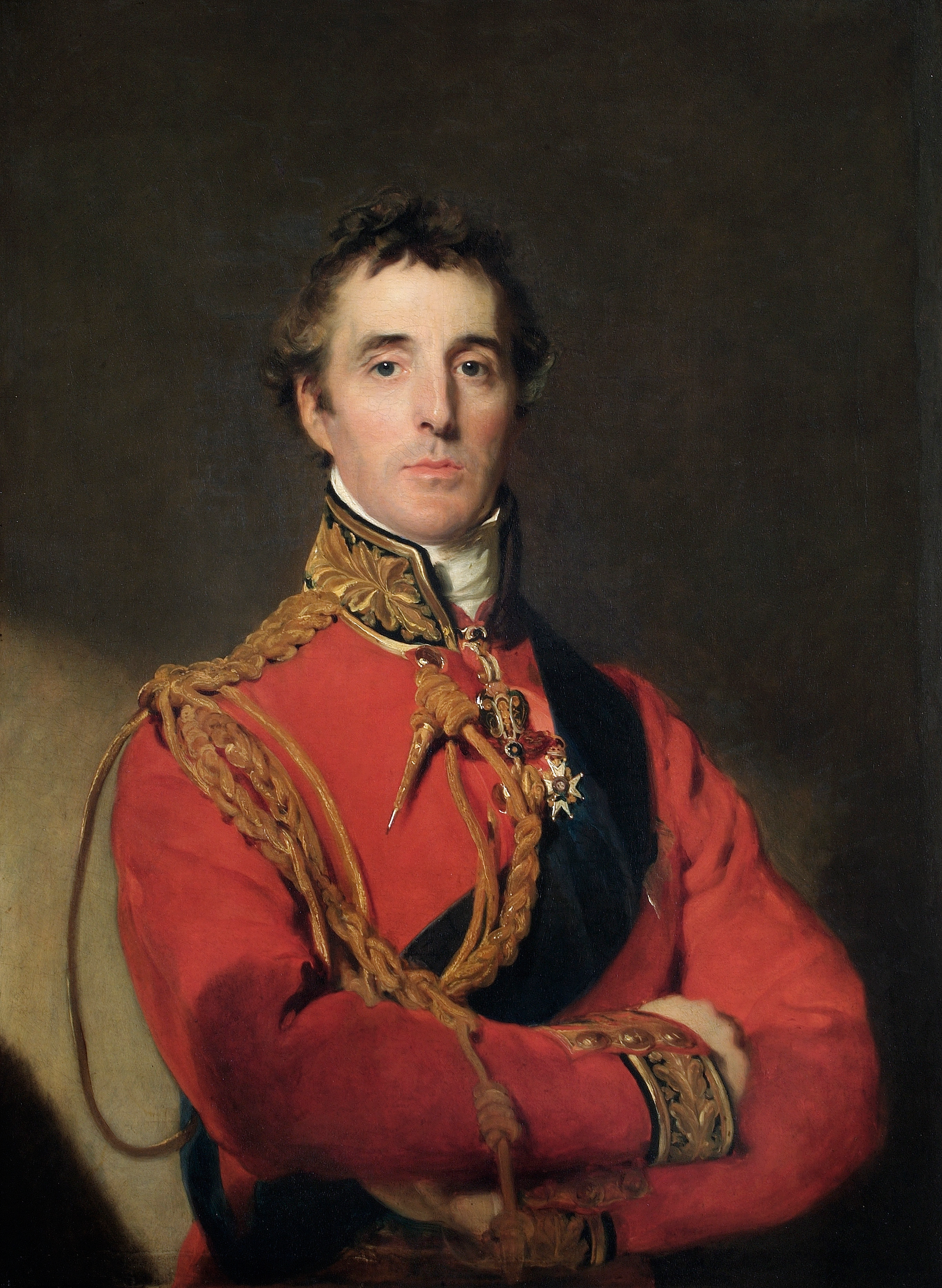
Arthur Wellesley, Duke of Wellington

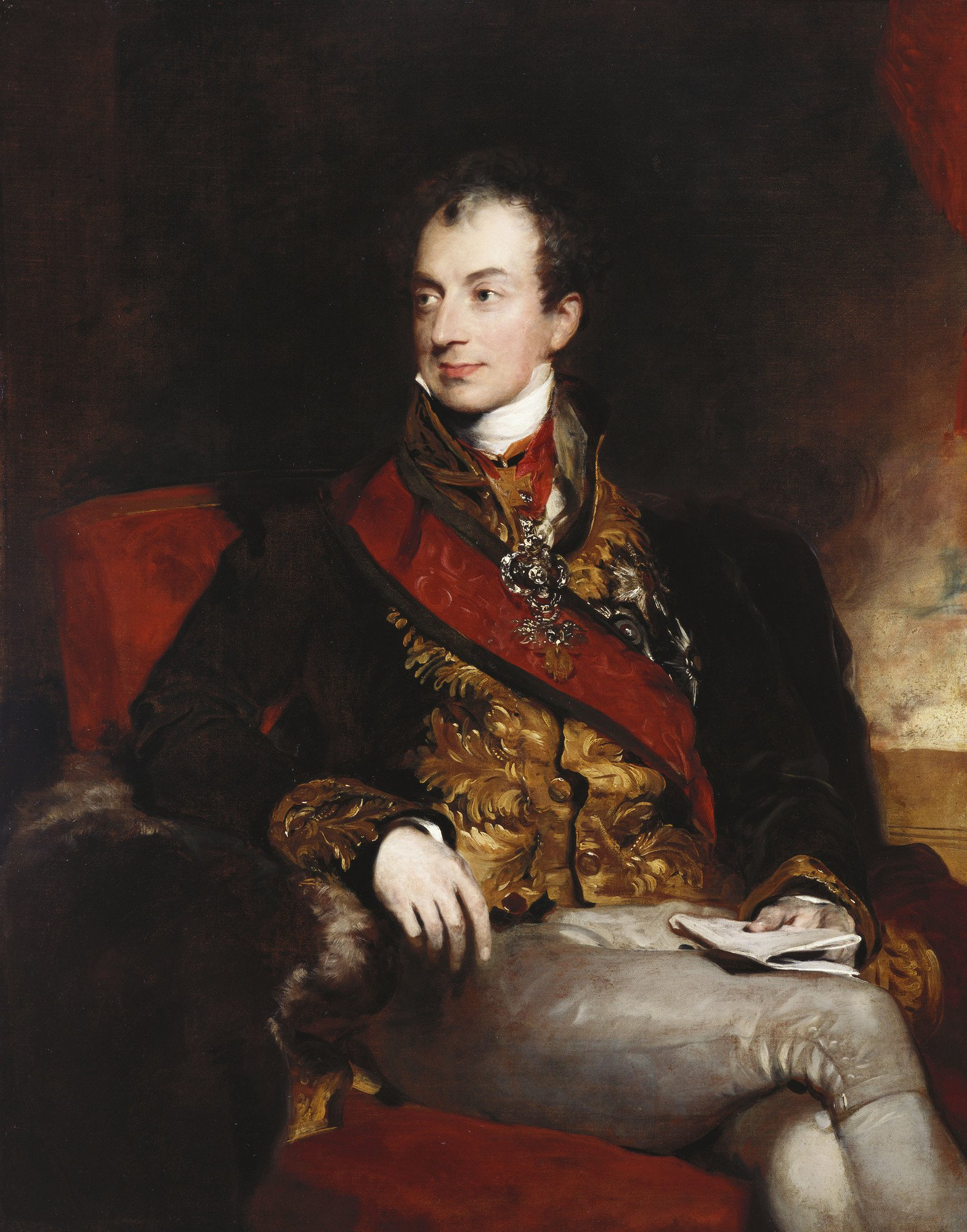
Prince Metternich of Austria

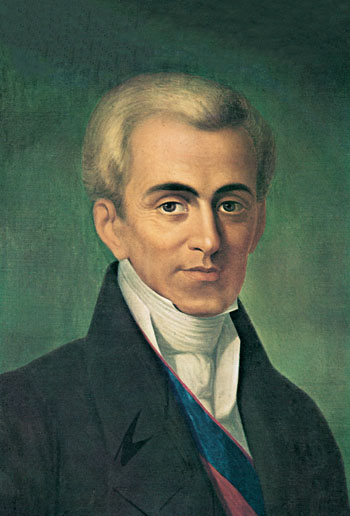
Count Capo d'Istria of Russia

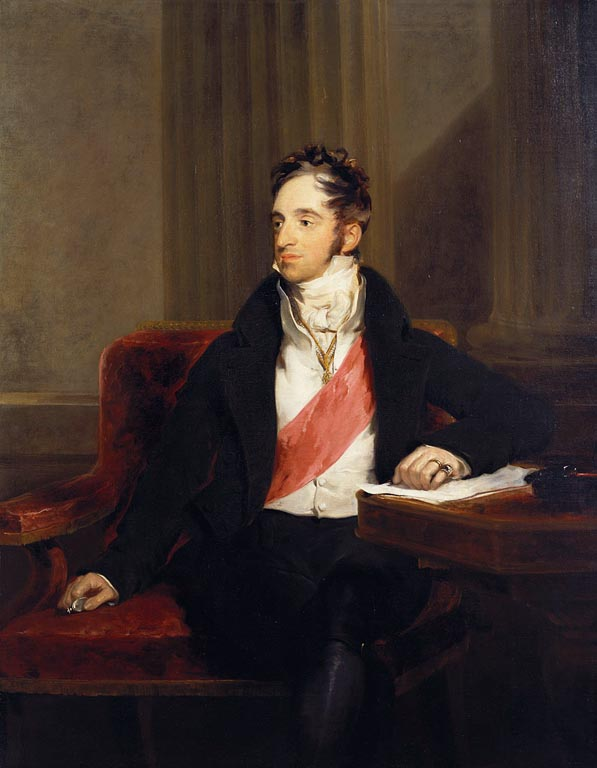
Count Nesselrode of Russia

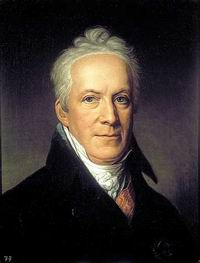
Prince Hardenberg of Prussia

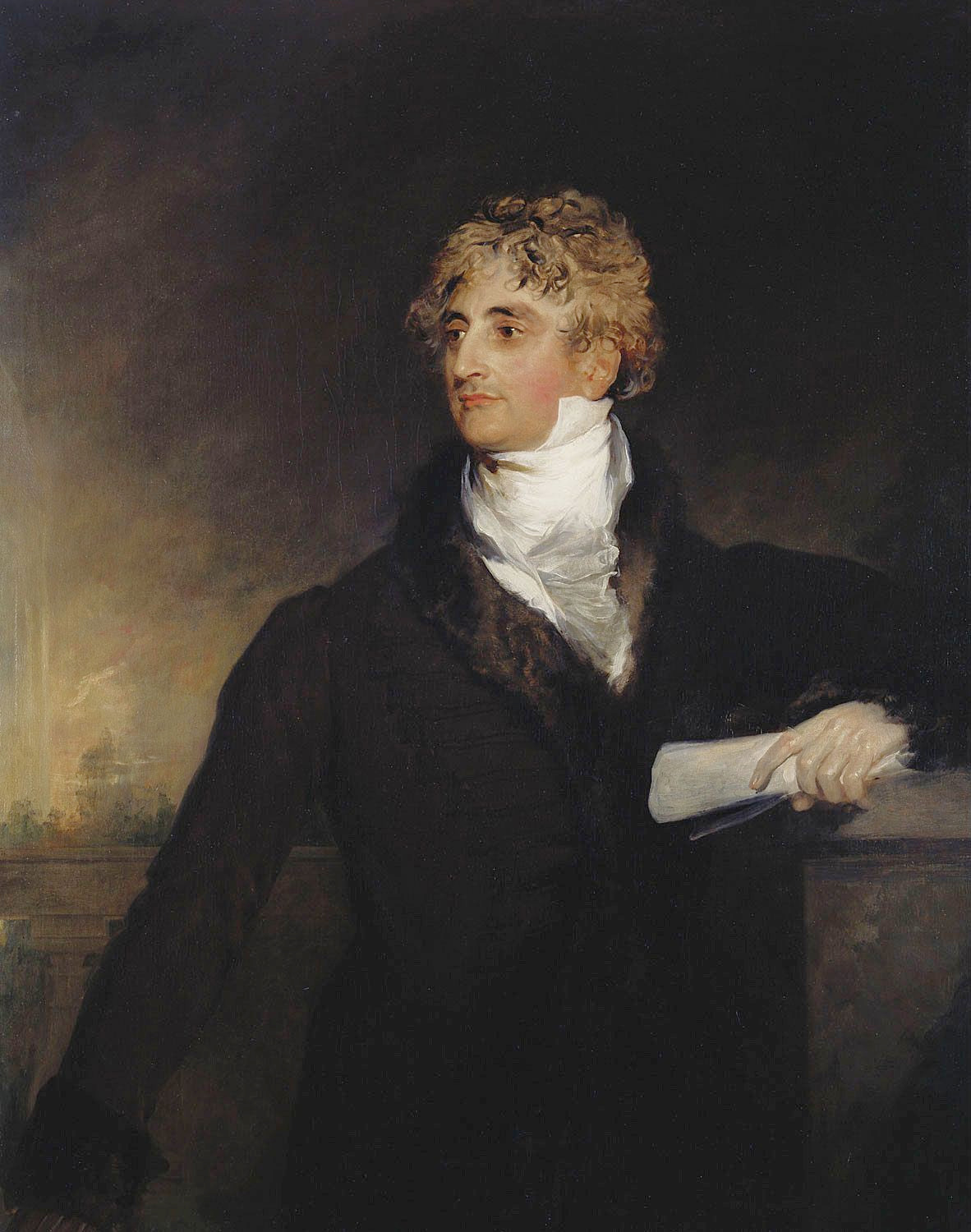
Duc de Richelieu of France

== See also ==
- International relations of the Great Powers (1814–1919)

== Bibliography ==
- Jarrett, Mark. The Congress of Vienna and Its Legacy: War and Great Power Diplomacy After Napoleon. I.B. Tauris, 2013.
- Palmer, Alan. Metternich: Councillor of Europe. Faber, 2010.
