= Portrait of Madame Reiset =

Painting by Anne-Louis Girodet de Roussy-Trioson

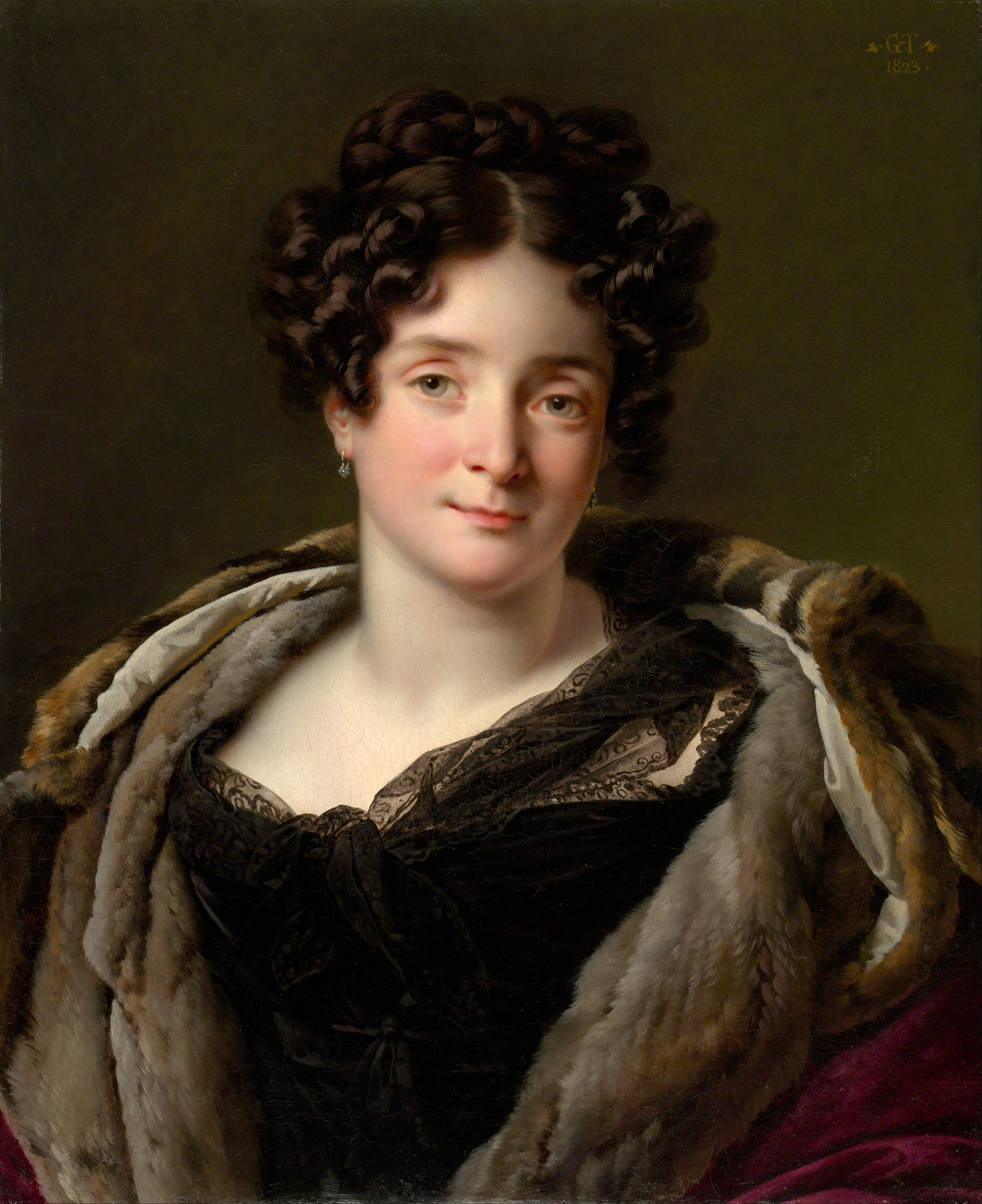
- Artist: Anne-Louis Girodet de Roussy-Trioson
- Year: 1823
- Type: Oil on canvas, portrait painting
- Dimensions: 60.3 cm × 49.5 cm (23.7 in × 19.5 in)
- Location: Metropolitan Museum of Art; New York

Portrait of Madame Reiset is an 1823 portrait painting by the French artist Anne-Louis Girodet de Roussy-Trioson. It depicts Colette-Désirée-Thérèse Godefroy (1782–1850), the wife of Jacques de Reiset, a French government official of the Restoration era. She was the mother of Frédéric Reiset, the art collector and curator at the Louvre. Today it is in the collection of the Metropolitan Museum of Art, in New York.

It reflects the Neoclassical influence of the artist's mentor Jacques-Louis David, as well as his interest in Florentine Renaissance art. The sitter had originally wanted a full-length portrait but Girodet persuaded her this half-length format would be better. She chose to wear a velour dress. It was one of the final portraits produced by the artist before his death the following year. It was exhibited at the Salon of 1824 in Paris.

== Bibliography ==
- Noon, Patrick & Bann, Stephen. Constable to Delacroix: British Art and the French Romantics. Tate, 2003.
