= Joan of Arc, Sick, Interrogated in Prison by the Cardinal of Winchester =

Painting by Paul Delaroche

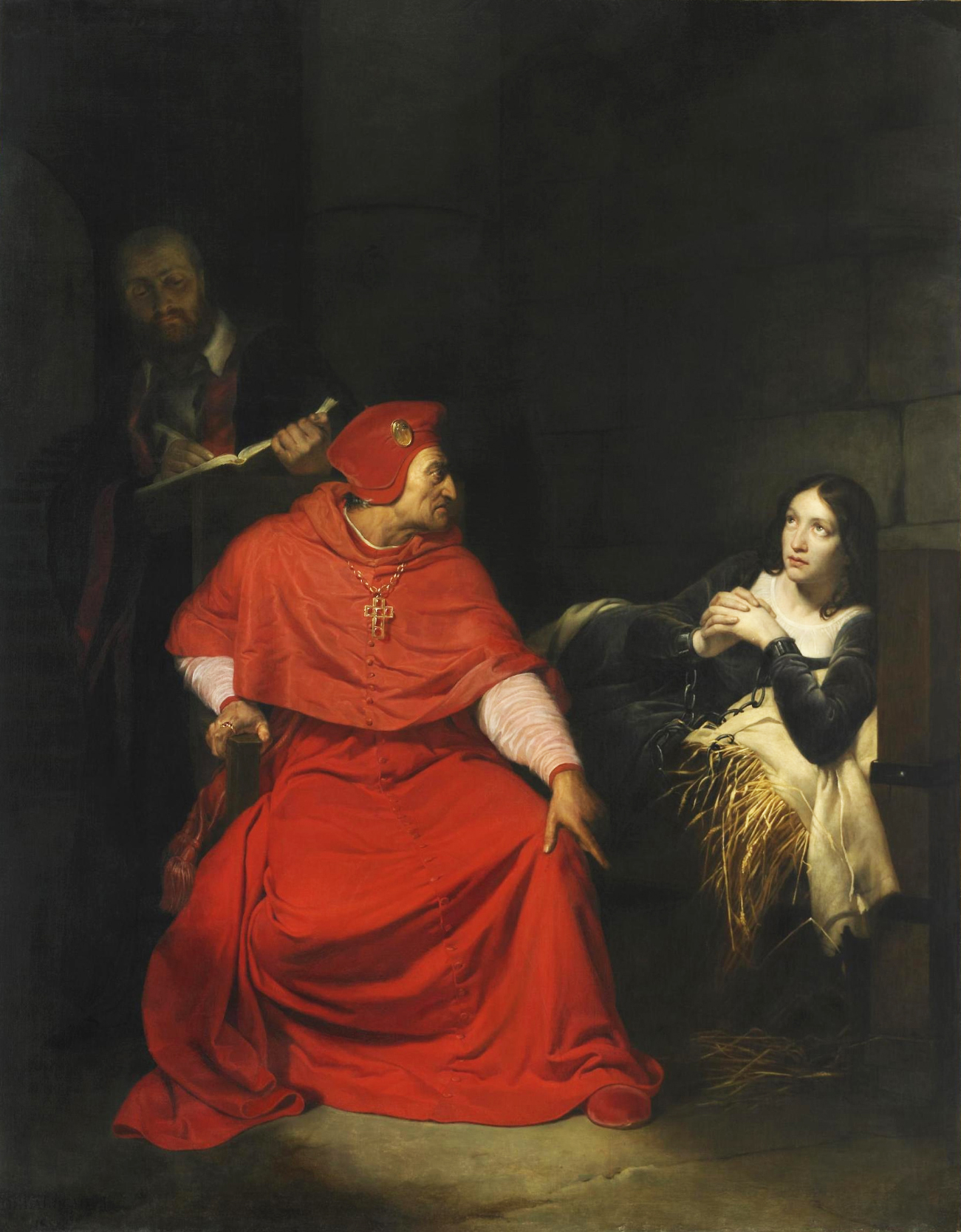
- Artist: Paul Delaroche
- Year: 1824
- Medium: Oil on canvas
- Dimensions: 277 cm × 217.5 cm (109 in × 85.6 in)
- Location: Musée des Beaux-Arts de Rouen, Rouen

Joan of Arc, Sick, Interrogated in Prison by the Cardinal of Winchester is an oil on canvas painting by French painter Paul Delaroche, created in 1824. The painting depicts Joan of Arc as she is being interrogated by Cardinal Henry Beaufort, of Winchester, despite the fact that the event never happened. It is held at the Musée des Beaux-Arts de Rouen.

== History and description ==
After her capture by the English, Joan was delivered on January 3, 1431, to the French ecclesiastical justice. She was questioned by the Bishop of Beauvais, Pierre Cauchon, in order to confuse her about the religious justifications for her intervention in favor of the King of France. For two weeks, Joan maintained her arguments, while her health deteriorated. Delaroche replaced Cauchon with an ecclesiastic better known to the English public, Henry Beaufort, cardinal and bishop of Winchester, who is featured in William Shakespeare's play Henry VI.

The painting represents three characters who stand out against a very dark background. Slightly off-center in the composition, Beaufort is seated, dressed in a characteristic cardinal's outfit: he is wrapped in his cassock, with his mozzetta covering the upper body, and wearing the biretta. He fills the space with the red colour, which is the only mass of intense colour of the painting. Joan is seen bedridden, with her face tired, looking to above, as if asking God's help, and with her wrists chained, while her hands have crossed fingers, as if in prayer. The composition shows Joan huddled to the right of the painting, as if she feels crushed by the presence of her interrogator. A third character, standing in the darkness, holds an open book and takes notes of the minutes of the interrogation.

The cardinal's gestures express the tension of the interrogation: one hand is clenched on the arm of his chair, the other extends his index finger imperatively, pointing downward as if to Hell. His mouth is tense and he has a severe expression. His profile against a dark background highlights an aquiline nose and accentuates the hardness of his gaze.

The darkened atmosphere only allows a few decorative elements to be seen. The large stones of the wall represent the dungeon, the partly torn pallet spills a few strands of straw on the ground, and symbolizes Joan's fragility, or, for the viewer warned of her martyrdom, prefigures her pyre.

Delaroche was inspired by English historical paintings created by Joshua Reynolds and his followers. He was aware of it through engravings. The pyramidal composition is based on a painting by James Northcote, where the Jesuit Feckenham questions Jane Grey. The positioning of the jailer on the left and the widening of the format reinforces the representation of the psychological tension between the interrogator and the accused.

A smaller version of the same painting is held at the Wallace Collection, in London.

== Reception ==
The painting was shown by Delaroche at the Salon of 1824 in Paris, where it was critically acclaimed. It received praise from Stendhal, who stated that it would help his young author to make a name.
