= Duck Shooting =

Painting by Horace Vernet

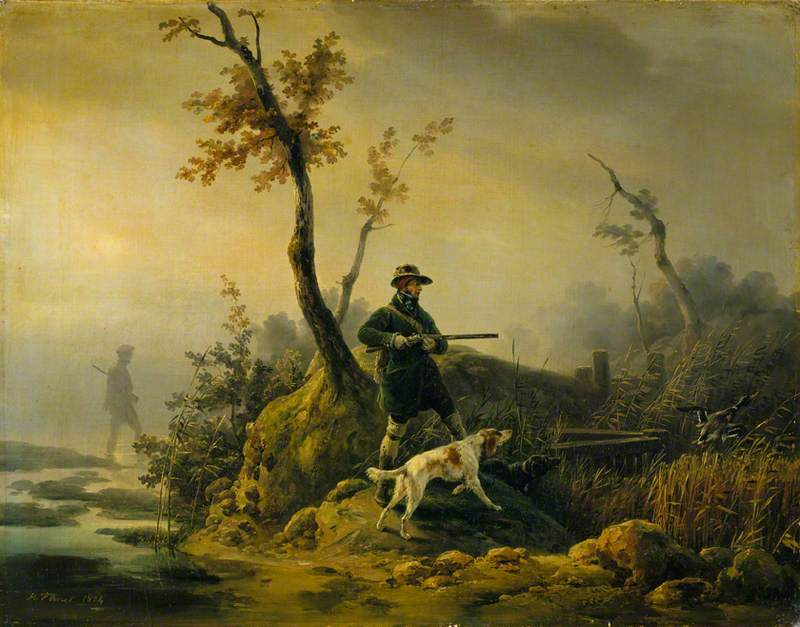
- Artist: Horace Vernet
- Year: 1824
- Type: Oil on canvas, genre painting
- Dimensions: 37.5 cm × 61.1 cm (14.8 in × 24.1 in)
- Location: Wallace Collection, London

Duck Shooting is an 1824 genre painting by the French artist Horace Vernet. It pays homage to the artist's father Carle Vernet who was very influenced by British sporting paintings and prints. It depicts a duck hunt in the marshes. Vernet often made reference to the works of his father and grandfather Joseph Vernet, both noted painters. It was exhibited at the Salon of 1824 in Paris along with its pendant piece The Quarry. Both paintings are now in the Wallace Collection in London.

== Bibliography ==
- Ingamells, John. The Wallace Collection: French Nineteenth Century. Trustees of the Wallace Collection, 1985.
- Harkett, Daniel & Hornstein, Katie (ed.) Horace Vernet and the Thresholds of Nineteenth-Century Visual Culture. Dartmouth College Press, 2017.
