= Salon of 1824 =

1824 art exhibition in Paris

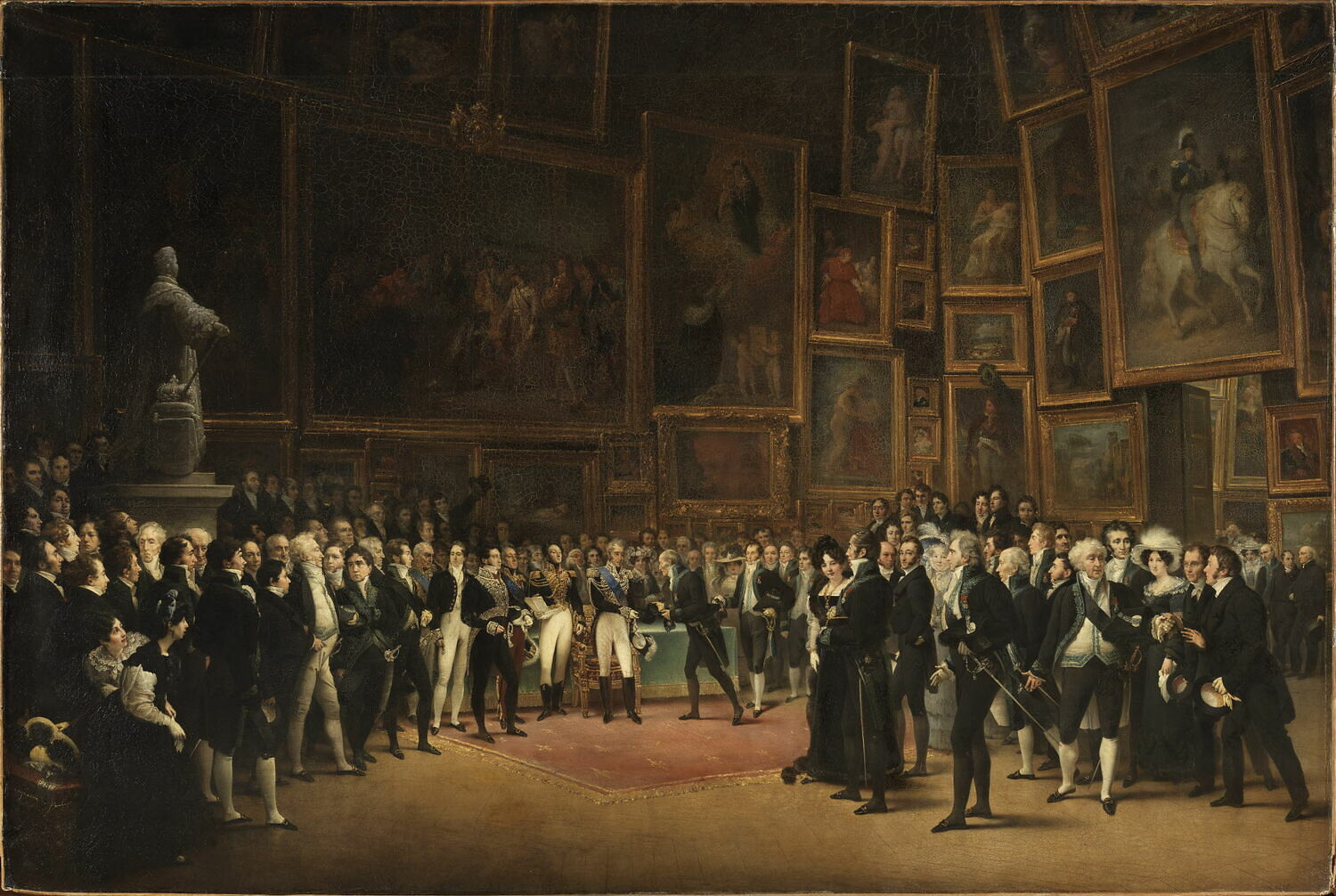
Charles X Distributing Awards to Artists by François Joseph Heim. The painting depicts the 1824 Salon and many prominent artists.

The Salon of 1824 was an art exhibition held at the Louvre in Paris between 25 August 1824 and 15 January 1825. It took place during the Restoration Era that followed the downfall of Napoleon's French Empire. At the time one of Europe's premier art exhibitions, the Salon was held roughly biennially during the period. It was the first to be held since Charles X succeeded to the throne earlier the same year.

== Exhibition ==
The Massacre at Chios by Eugène Delacroix

Amongst French painters there was anticipation over the return of Horace Vernet who had drawn interest at the Salon of 1819. When two of his paintings had been rejected by the committee for the 1822 Salon, he had responded by withdrawing all his entries bar one and went on to hold a private exhibition in his own studios which was a great success. In 1824 he exhibited more than twenty paintings, including older works that functioned as a retrospective.

Amongst paintings displayed were Paul Delaroche's Joan of Arc, Sick, Interrogated in Prison by the Cardinal of Winchester depicting a scene from the Medieval era. Notable portraits included Portrait of Madame Reiset by Girodet and the Portrait of Marshal Saint-Cyr by Vernet. Several of Vernet's large battle scenes were also exhibited including The Battle of Hanau and The Battle of Montmirail, as well as his genre painting Duck Shooting. Sculptures included Psyché by James Pradier and Dying Eurydice by Charles-François Leboeuf. Touching on more recent events The Death of the Duke of Berry by Alexandre Menjaud portrayed the aftermath of the assassination of the Duke of Berry, the son of Charles X, in 1820.

The Salon featured a sharp contrast between neoclassical and romantic art typified by Eugène Delacroix's The Massacre at Chios depicting a scene from the Greek War of Independence and The Vow of Louis XIII by Jean-Auguste-Dominique Ingres. This growing rivalry continued into the next Salon in 1827.

Many of the officials, sculptors and painters involved in the 1824 Salon were featured in François Joseph Heim's 1827 painting Charles X Distributing Awards to Artists.

== British Salon ==
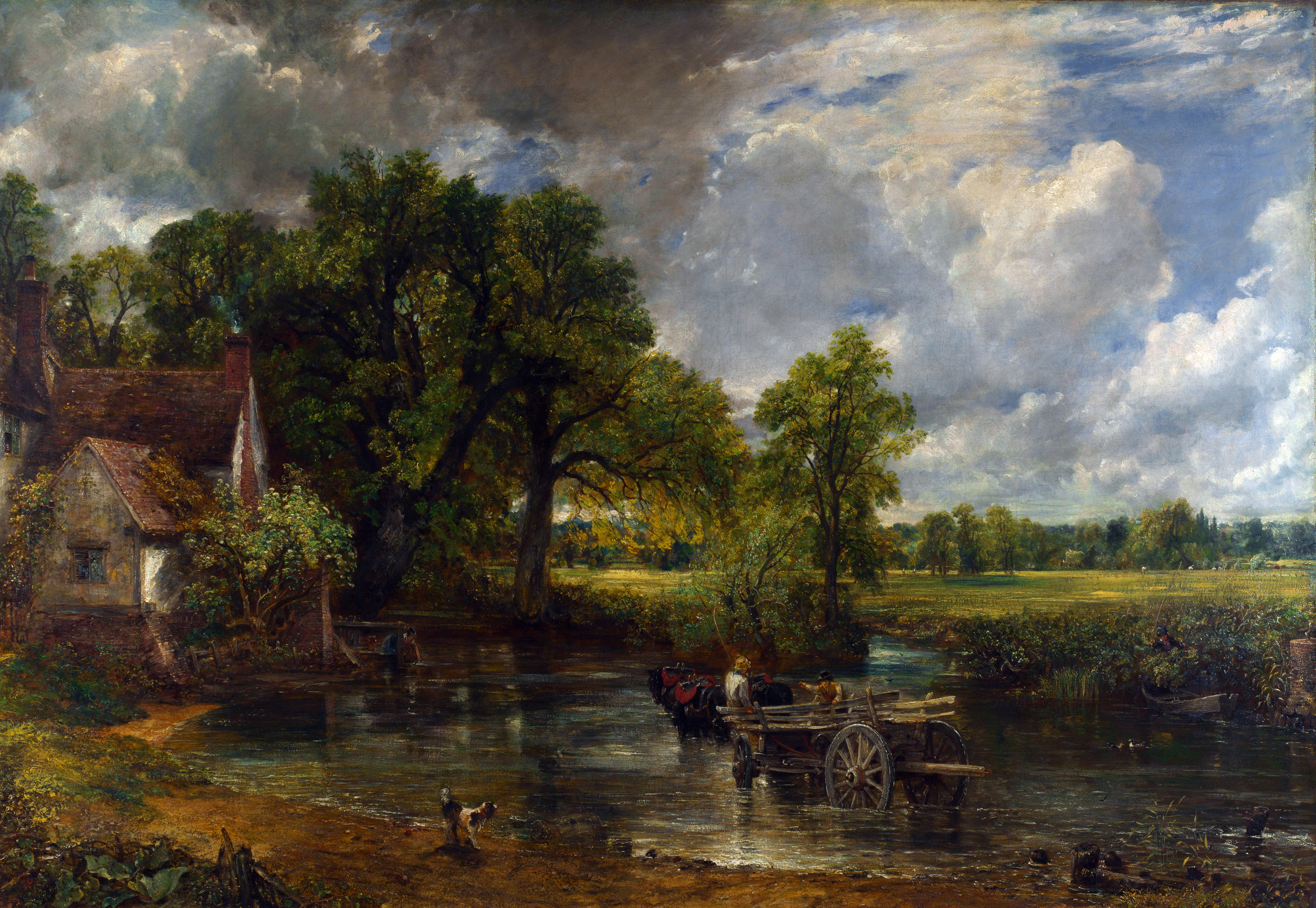
The Hay Wain by John Constable

For the first time several leading British artists exhibited at the Salon, although J. M. W. Turner was notably absent. Although the British contingent was small, it had a disproportionate influence on reporting of the exhibition. The President of the Royal Academy Sir Thomas Lawrence sent a copy of his Portrait of the Duke of Richelieu featuring a recent French Prime Minister. Richard Parkes Bonington a young Anglo-French artist exhibited five landscapes and was awarded a gold medal, together with John Constable and Sir Thomas Lawrence. Copley Fielding was also awarded one for his watercolors.

Most notably John Constable, a comparatively unsuccessful British artist was hailed for his entries, particularly The Hay Wain which featured a landscape painting of the River Stour in his native Suffolk.The French government unsuccessfully attempted to acquire it for the Louvre, but it is now in the collection of the National Gallery in London. Also displayed were View on the Stour near Dedham and Yarmouth Jetty.

At the subsequent Salon of 1827 the British participation was larger and included Lawrence's The Red Boy and Constable's The Cornfield.

== Gallery ==
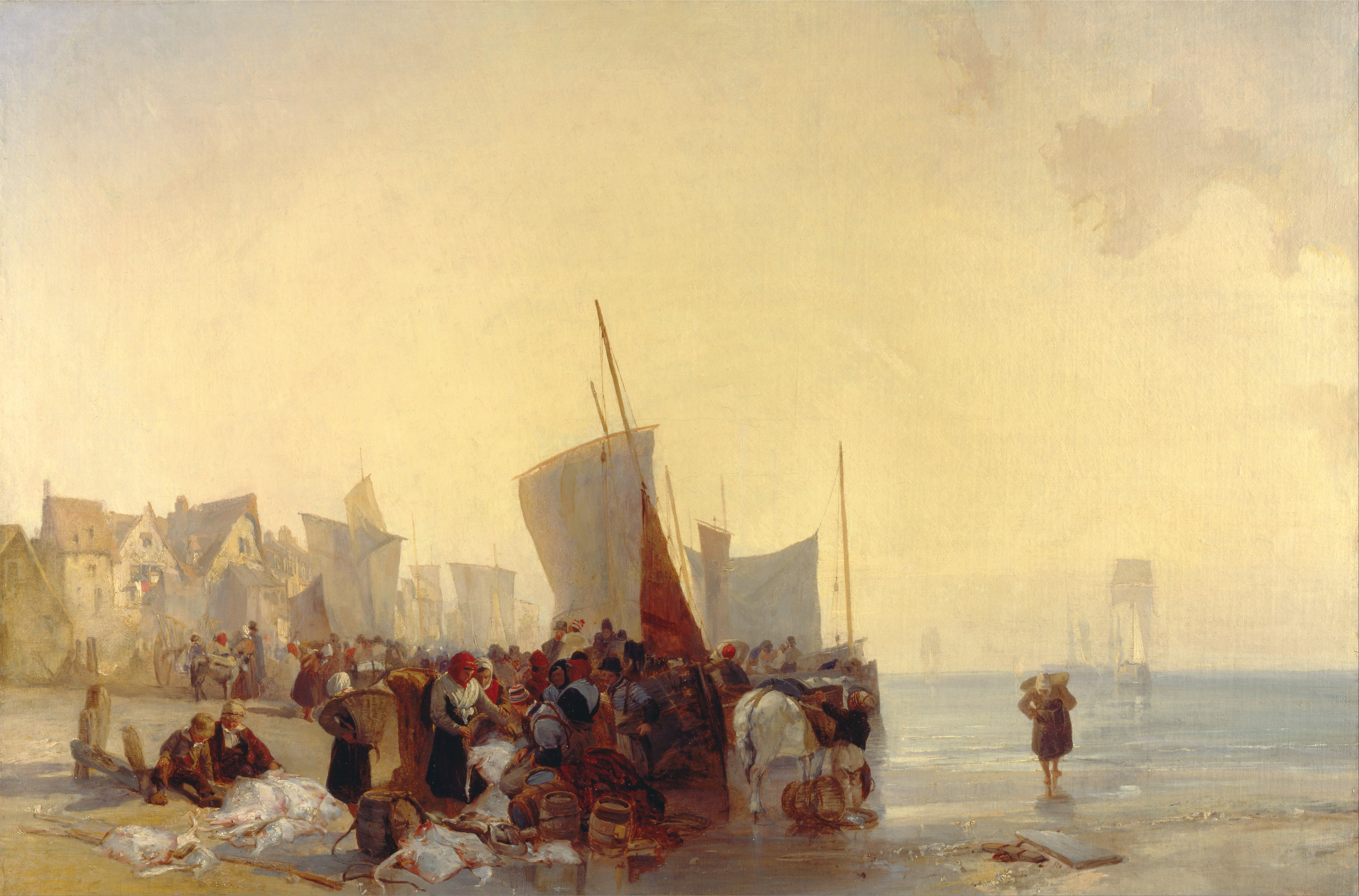
A Fishmarket near Boulogne by Richard Parkes Bonington

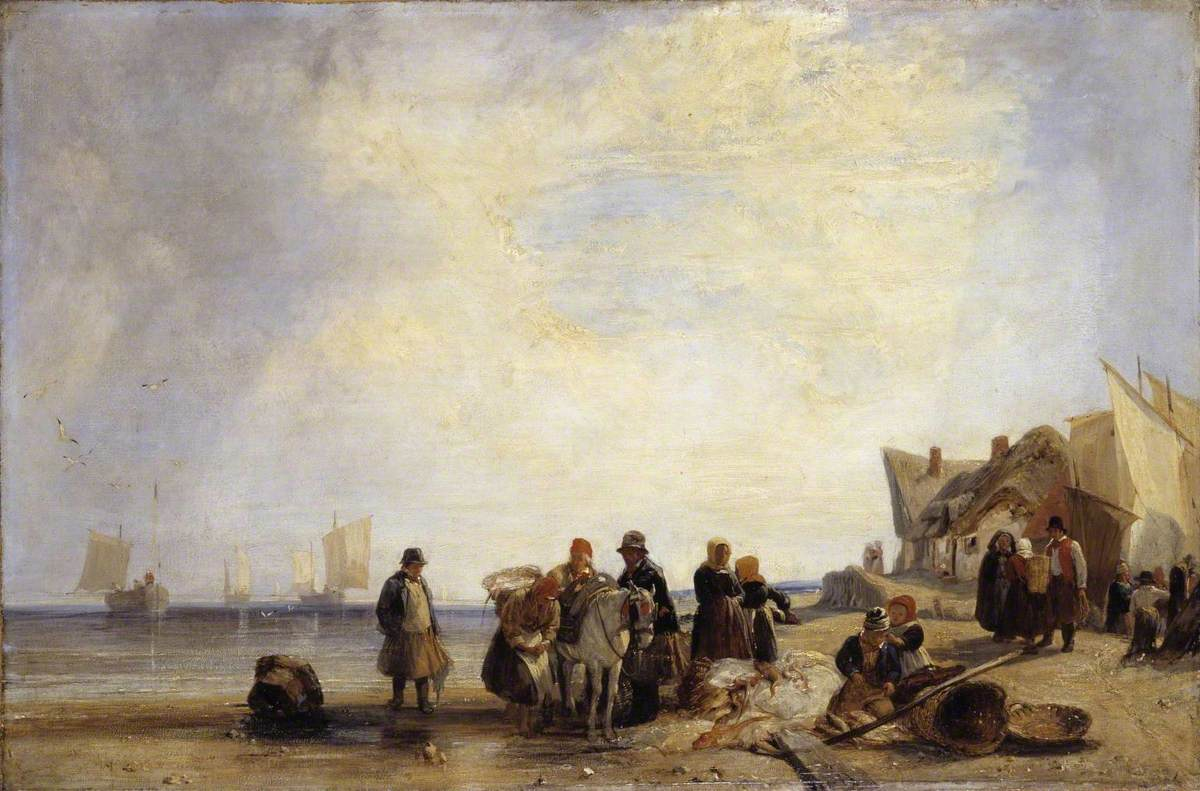
French Coast with Fisherman by Richard Parkes Bonington

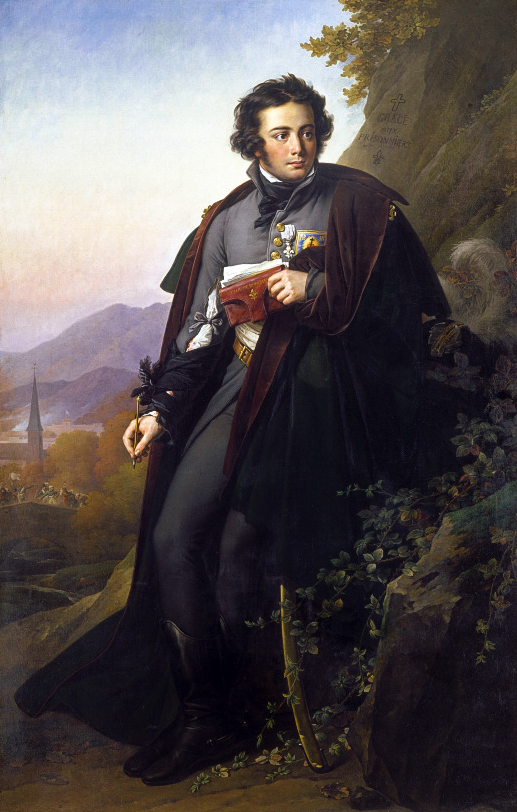
Portrait of the Marquis de Bonchamps by Anne-Louis Girodet

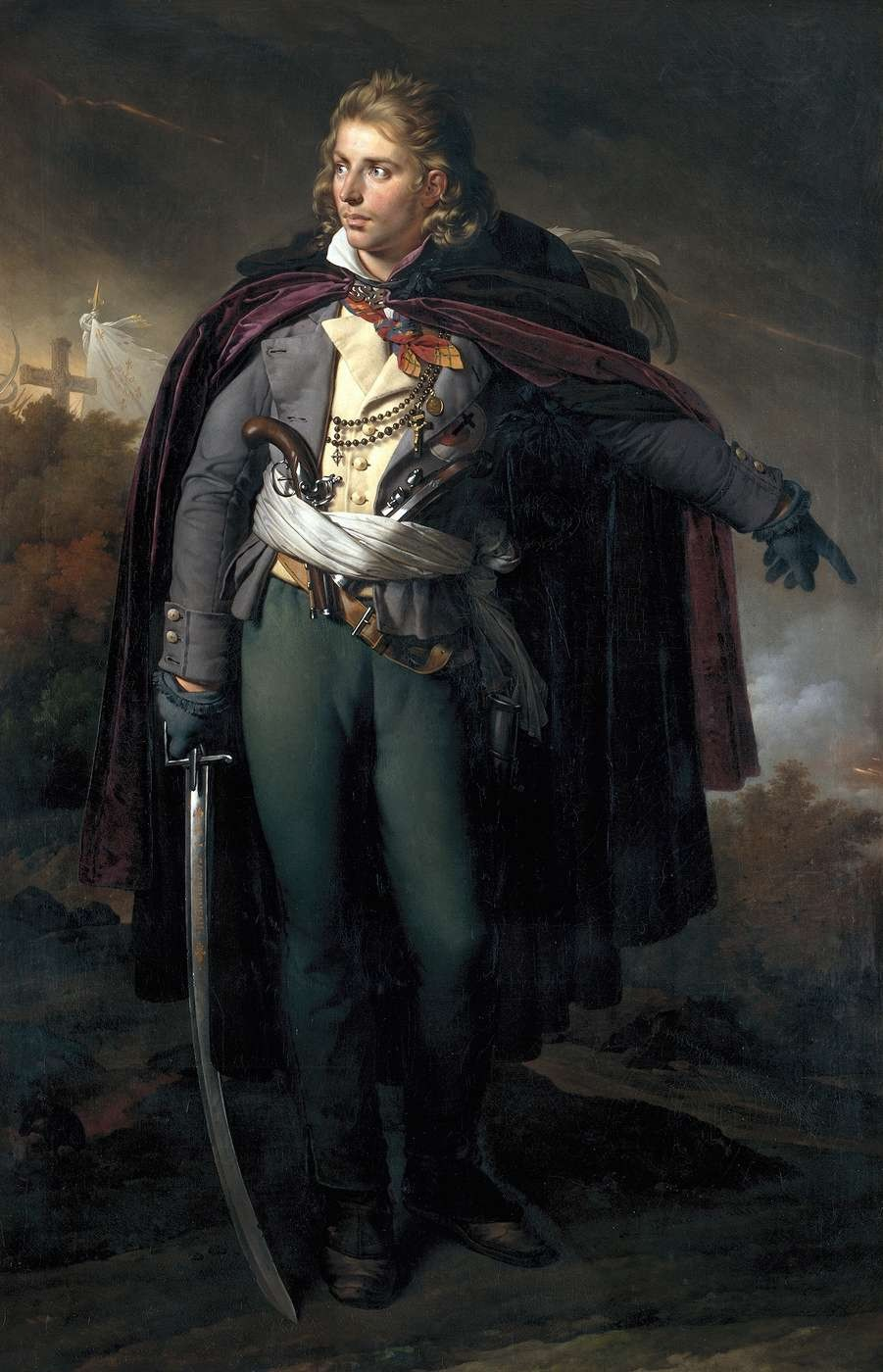
Portrait of Jacques Cathelineau by Anne-Louis Girodet

The Vow of Louis XIII by Jean-Auguste-Dominique Ingres

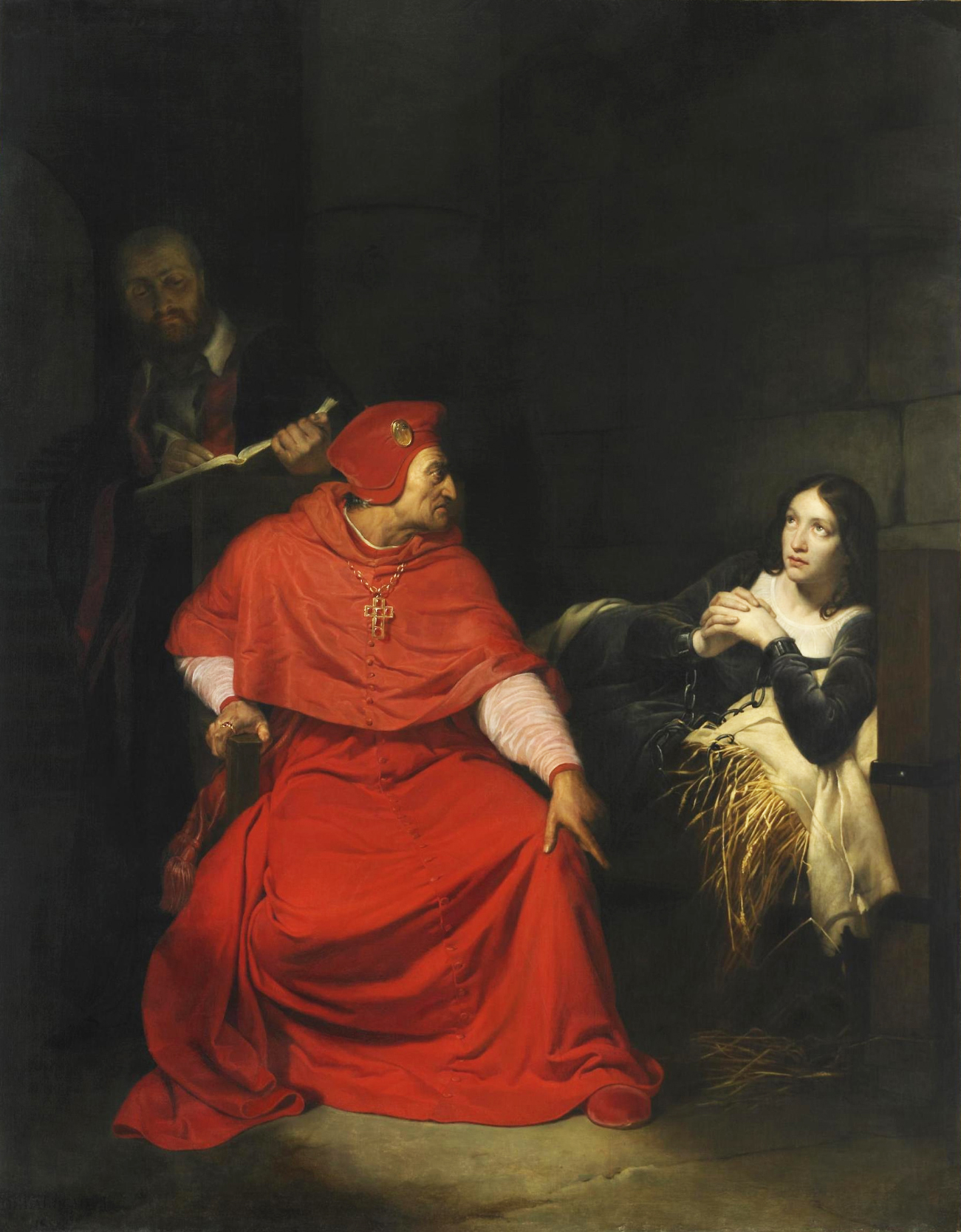
Joan of Arc Interrogated by the Cardinal of Winchester by Paul Delaroche

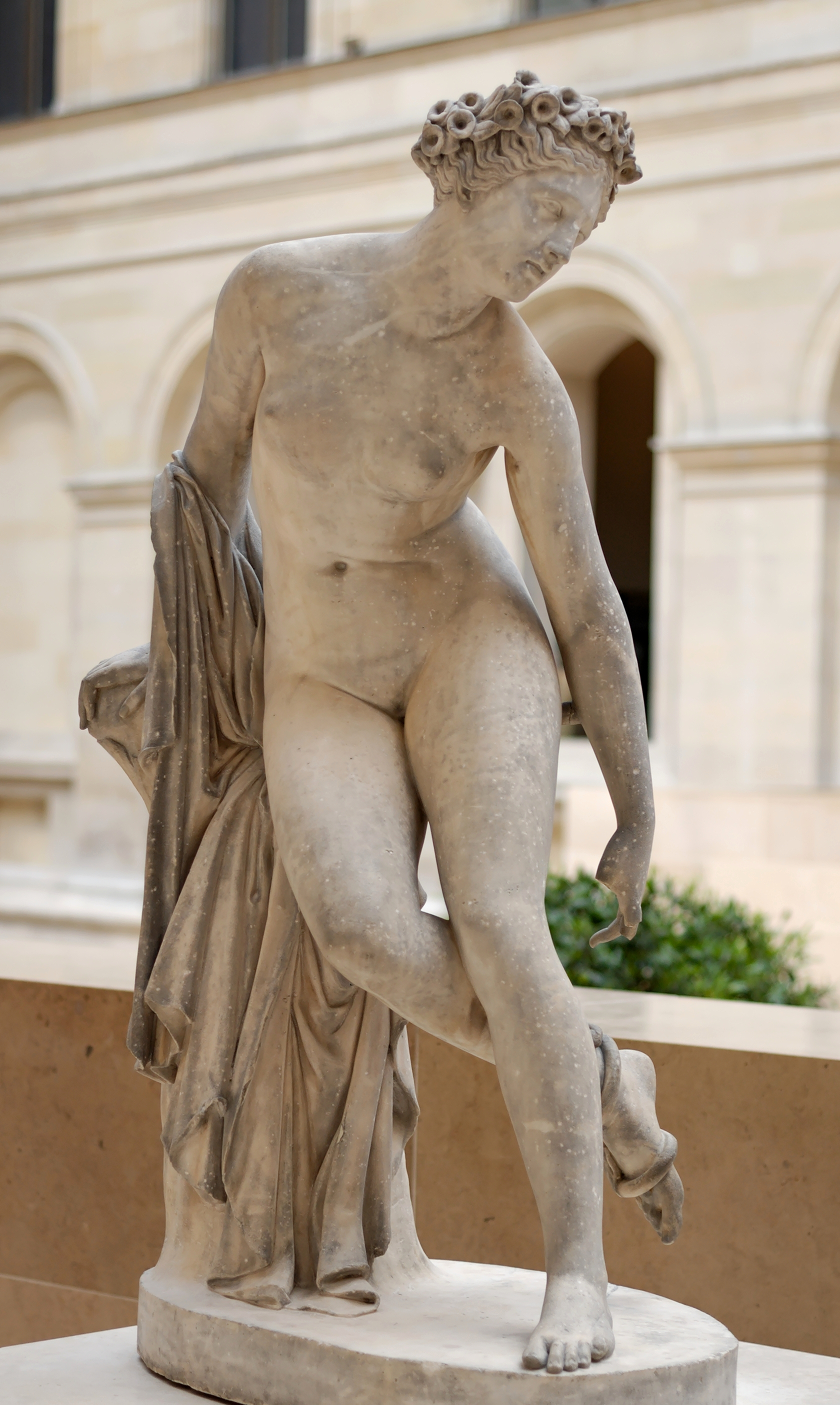
Dying Eurydice by Charles-François Leboeuf

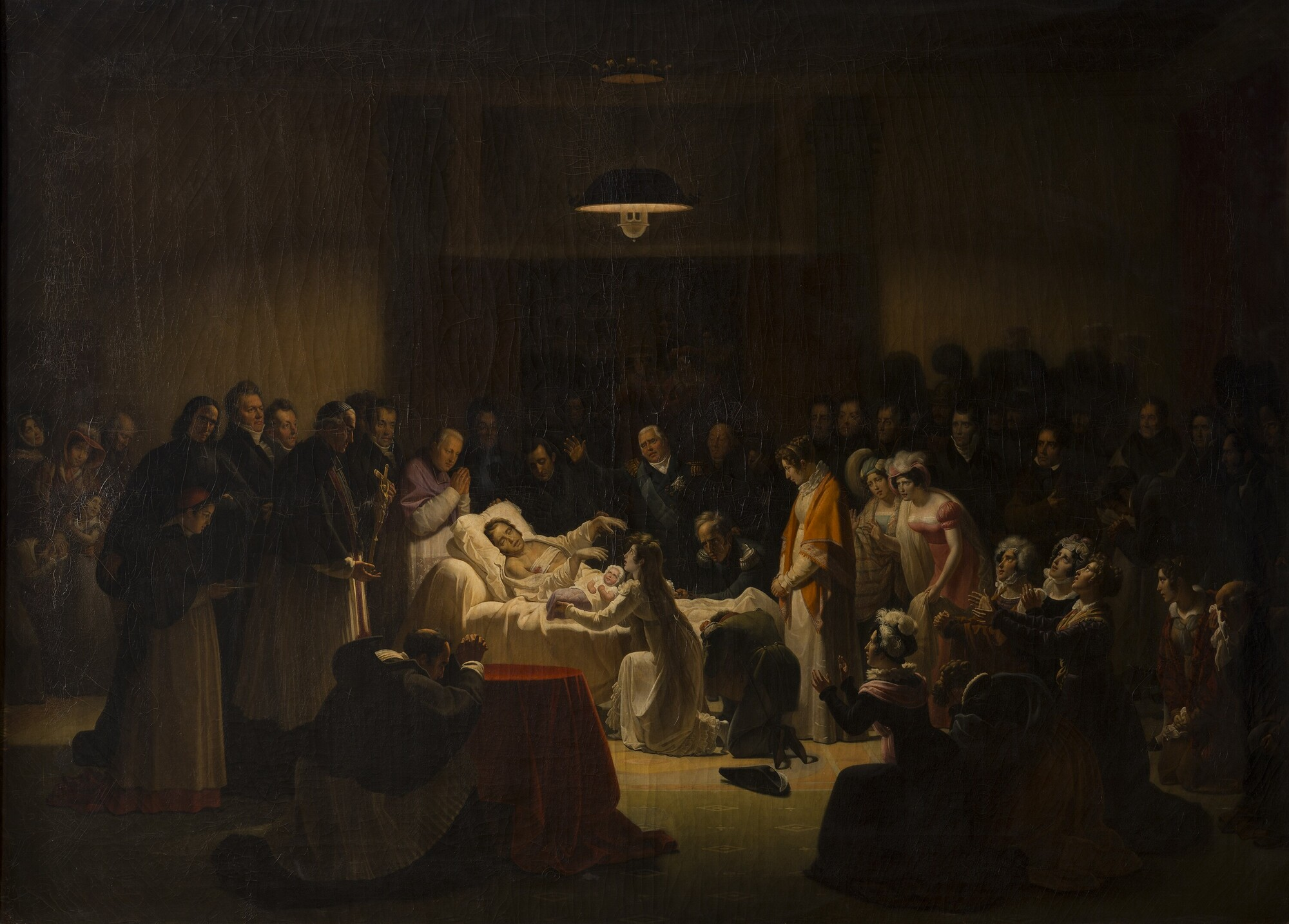
The Death of the Duke of Berry by Alexandre Menjaud

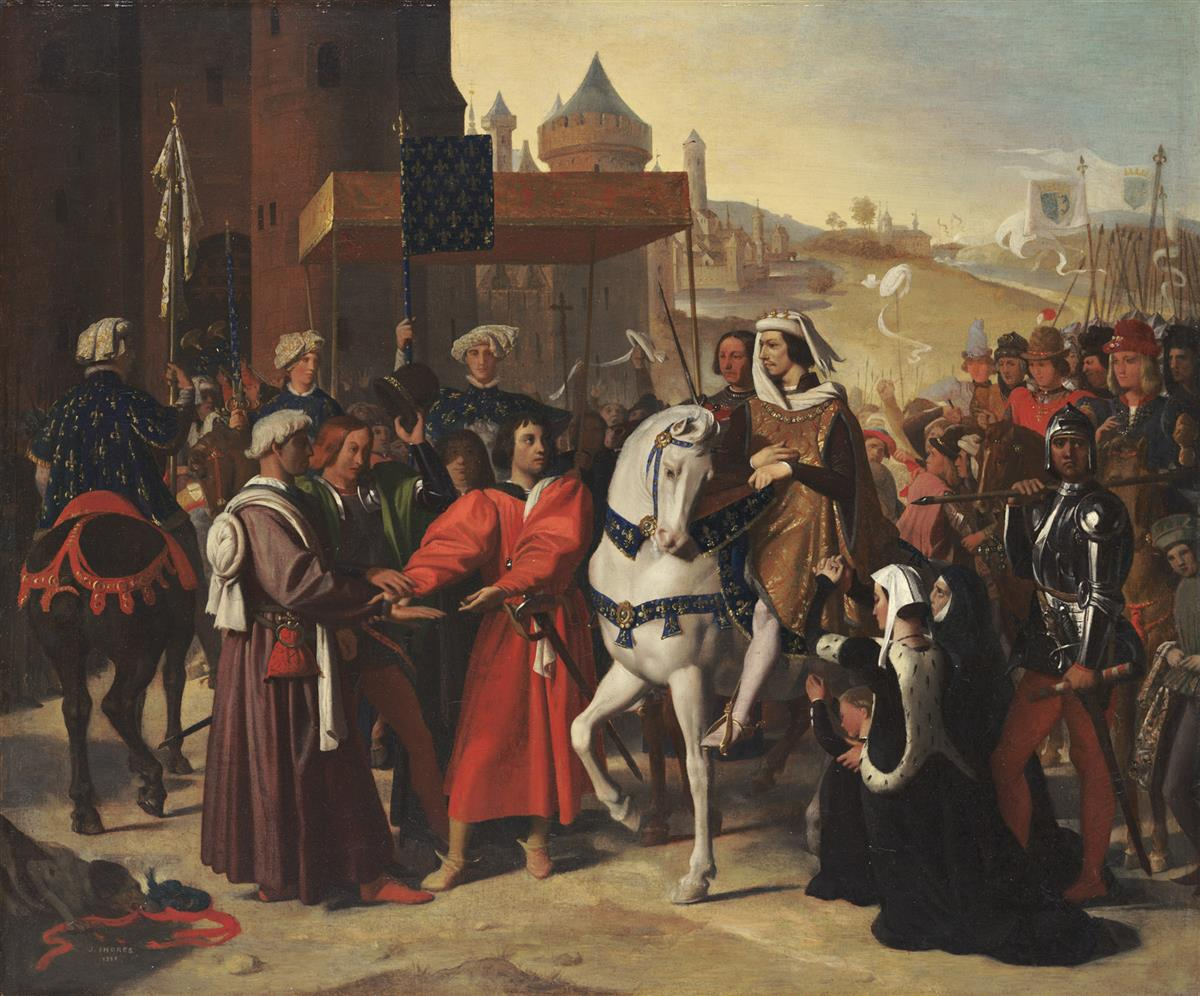
The Dauphin's Entry Into Paris by Jean-Auguste-Dominique Ingres

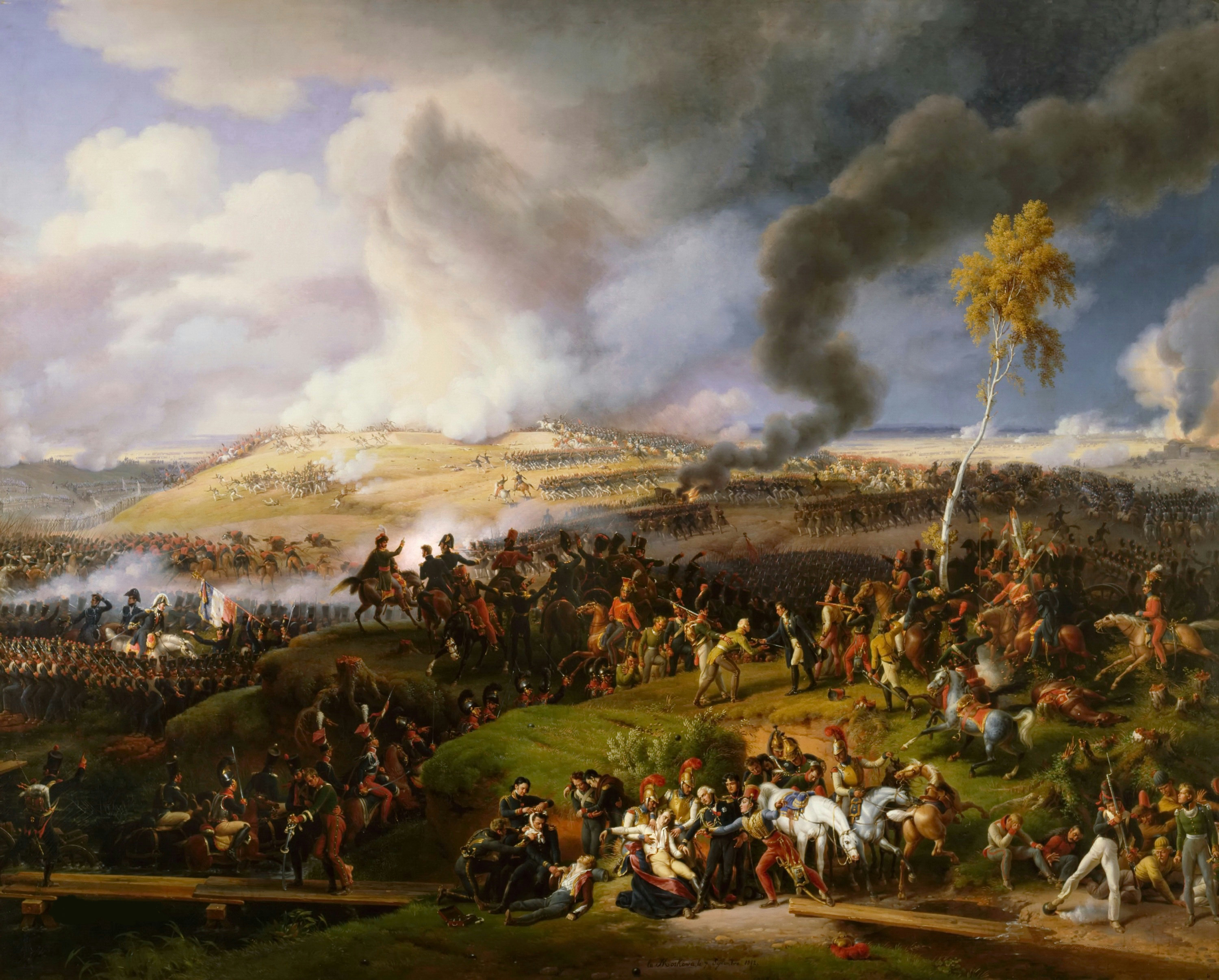
The Battle of Moscow by Louis-François Lejeune

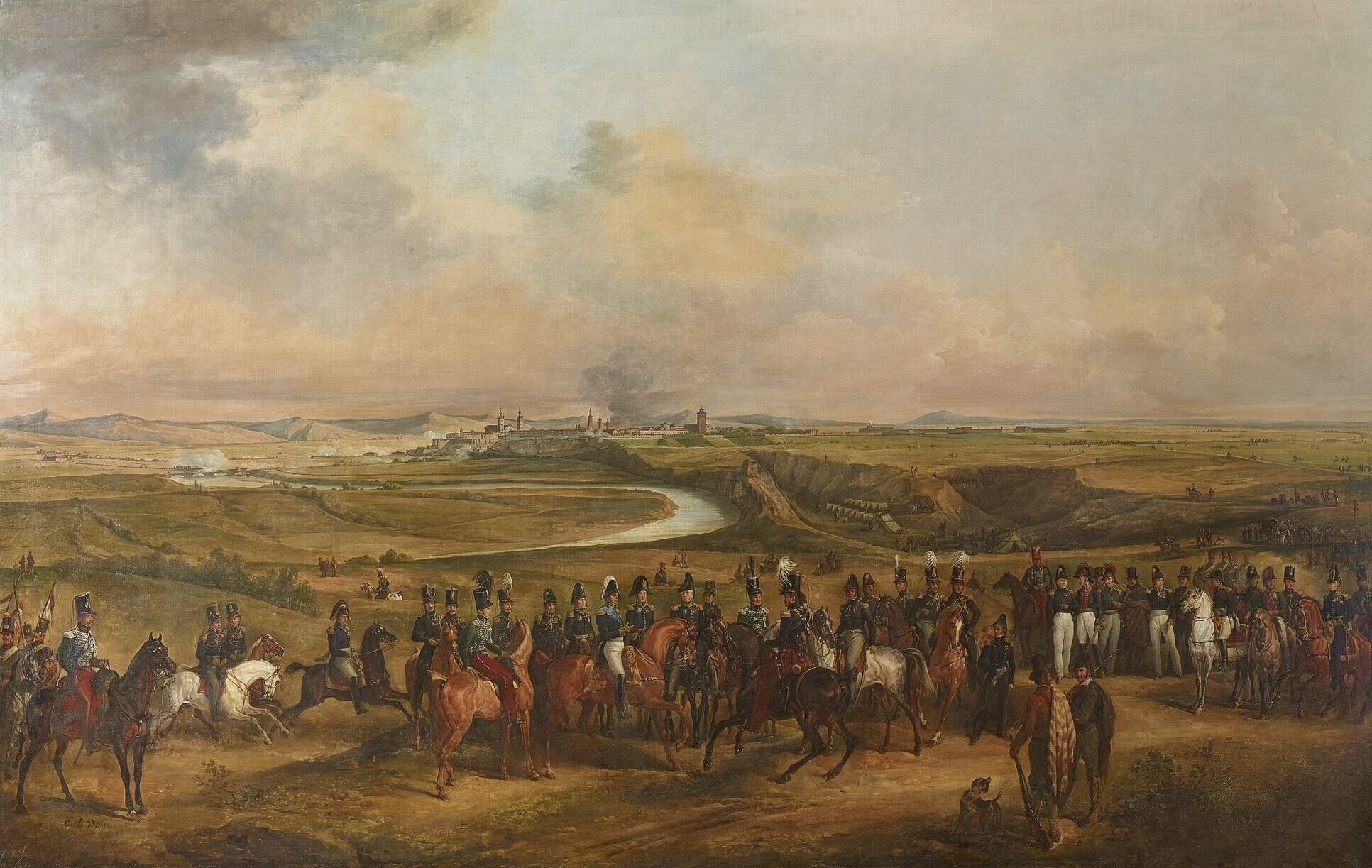
Capture of Pamplona, 17 September 1823 by Carle Vernet

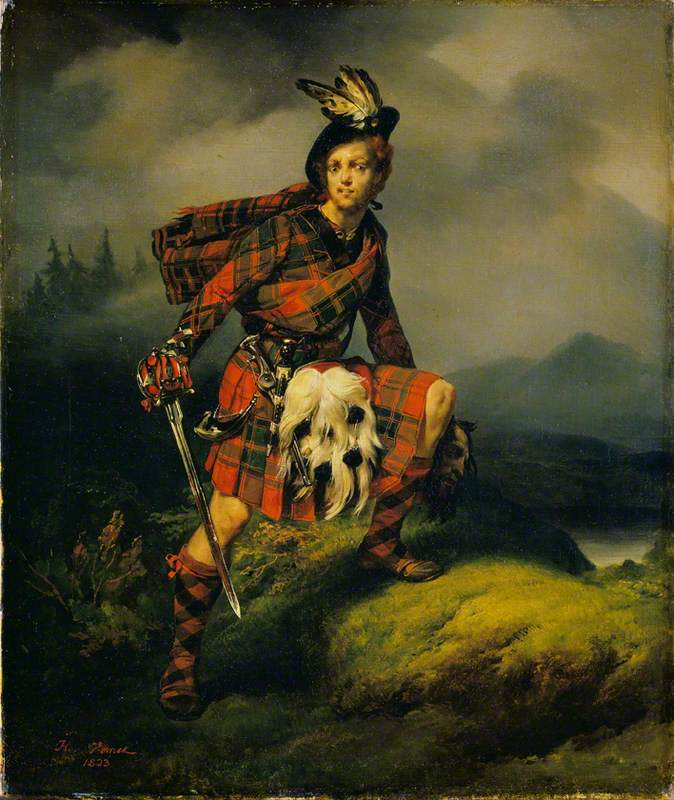
Allan M'Aulay by Horace Vernet

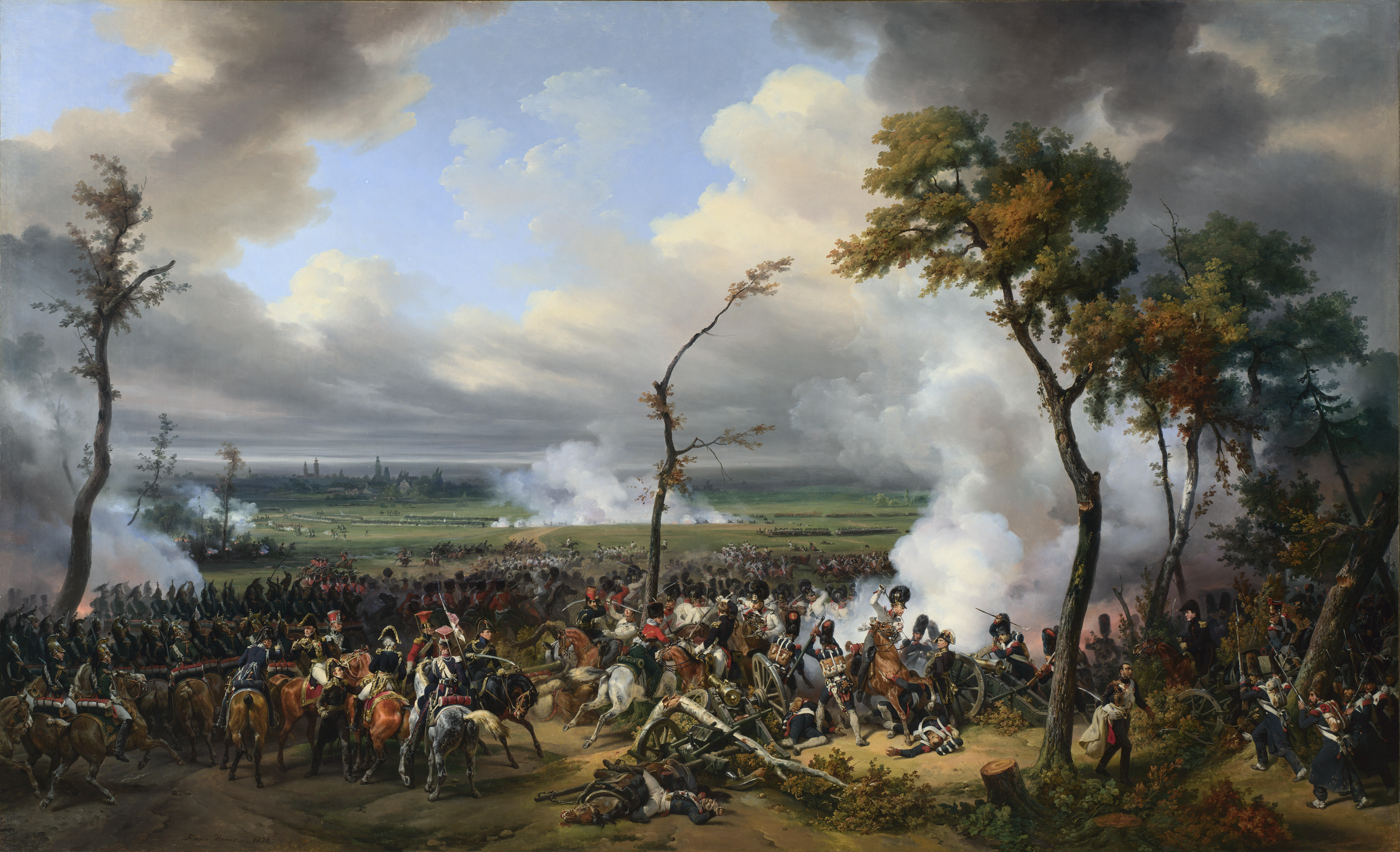
The Battle of Hanau by Horace Vernet

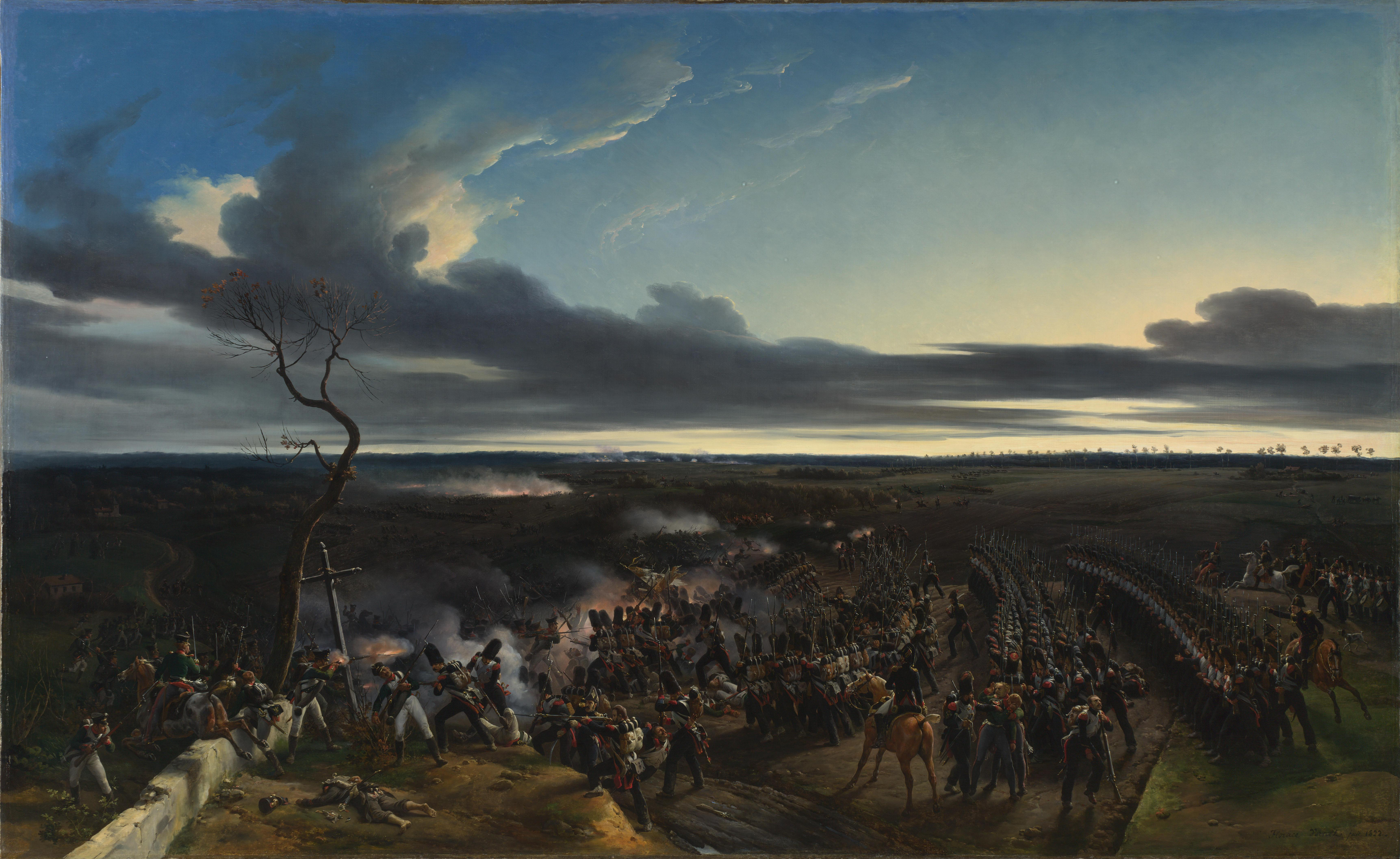
The Battle of Montmirail by Horace Vernet

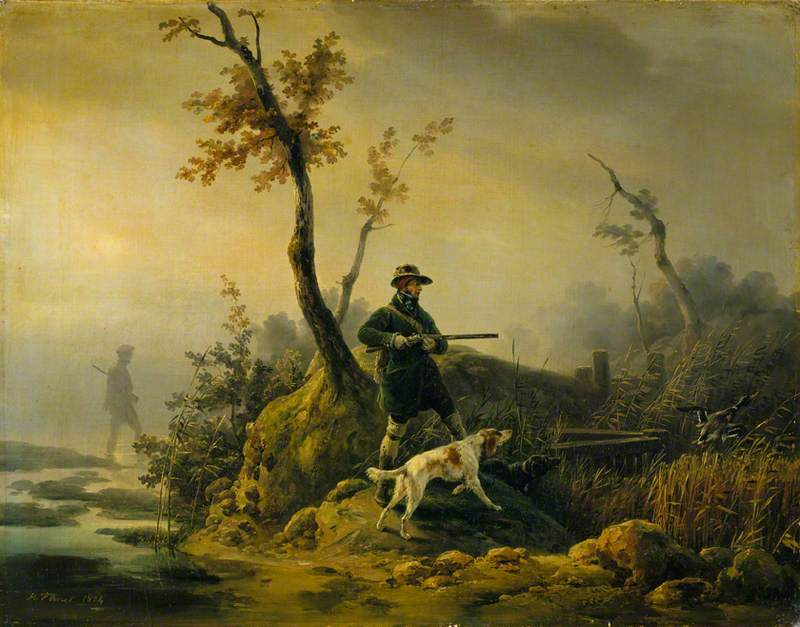
Duck Shooting by Horace Vernet

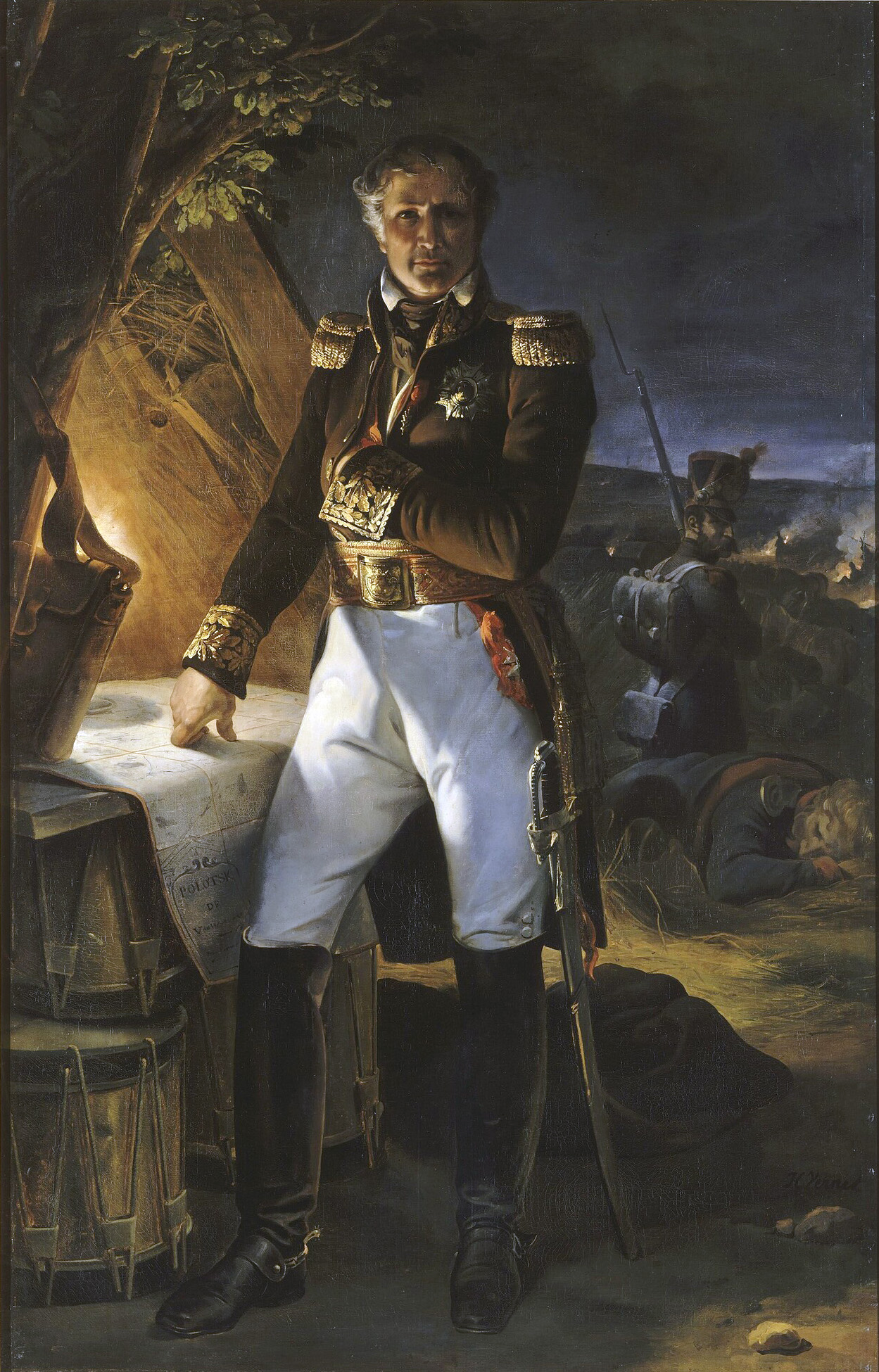
Portrait of Marshal Saint-Cyr by Horace Vernet

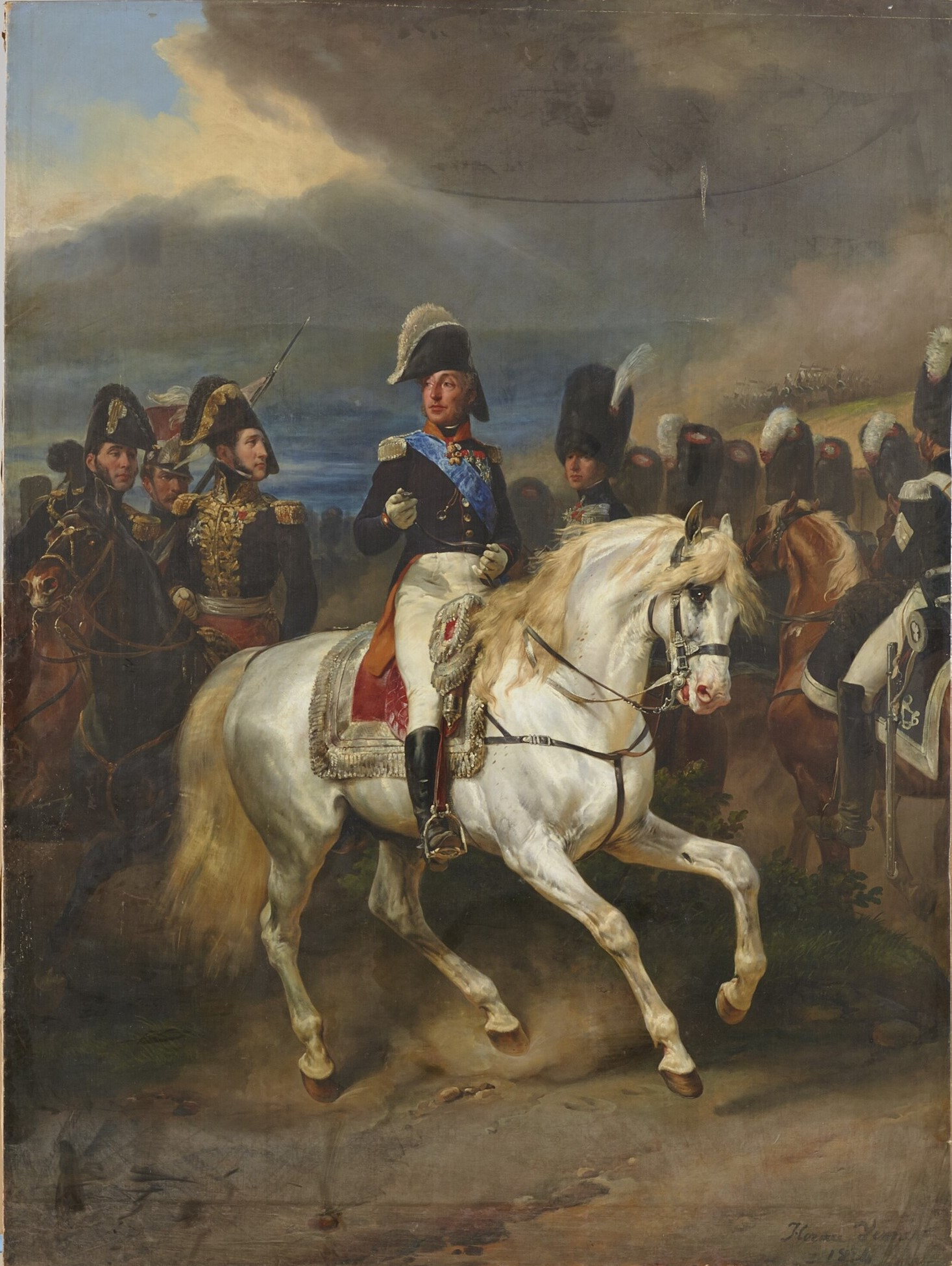
Portrait of the Duke of Angoulême by Horace Vernet

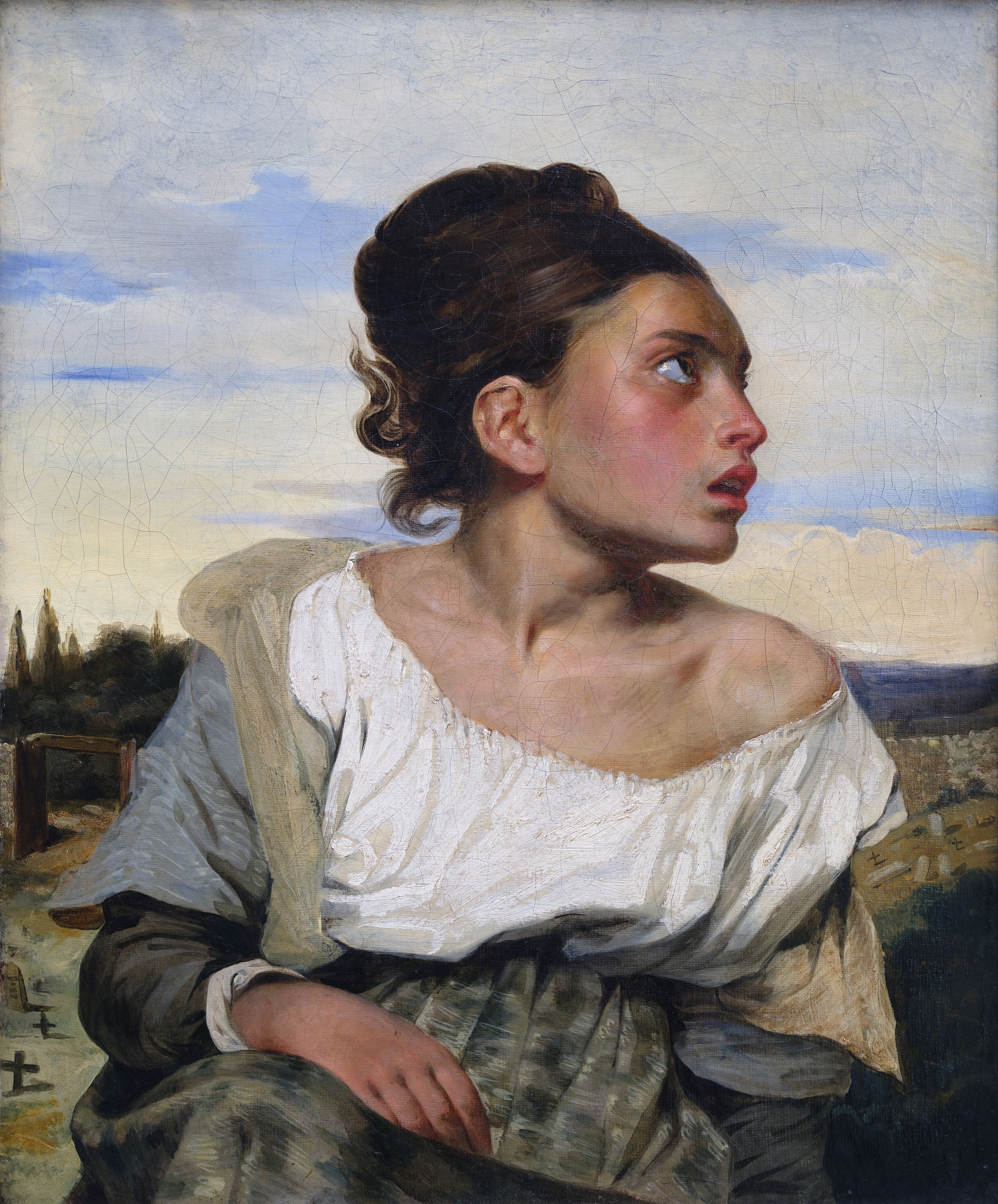
Orphan Girl at the Cemetery by Eugène Delacroix

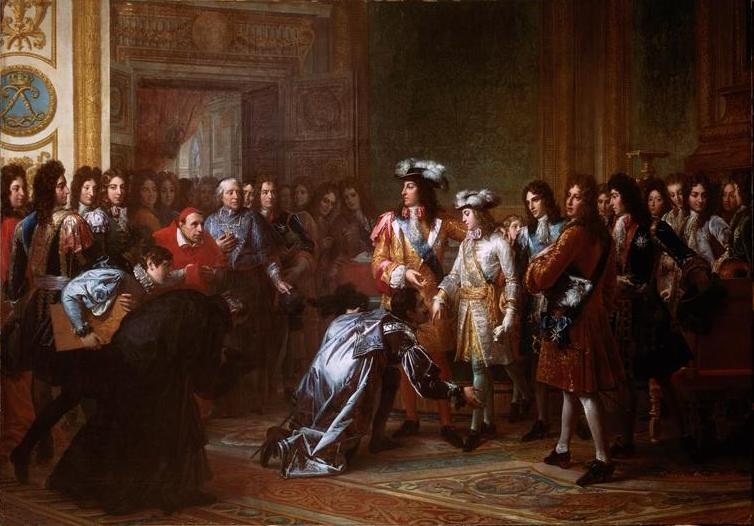
Phillip V Proclaimed as King of Spain by François Gérard

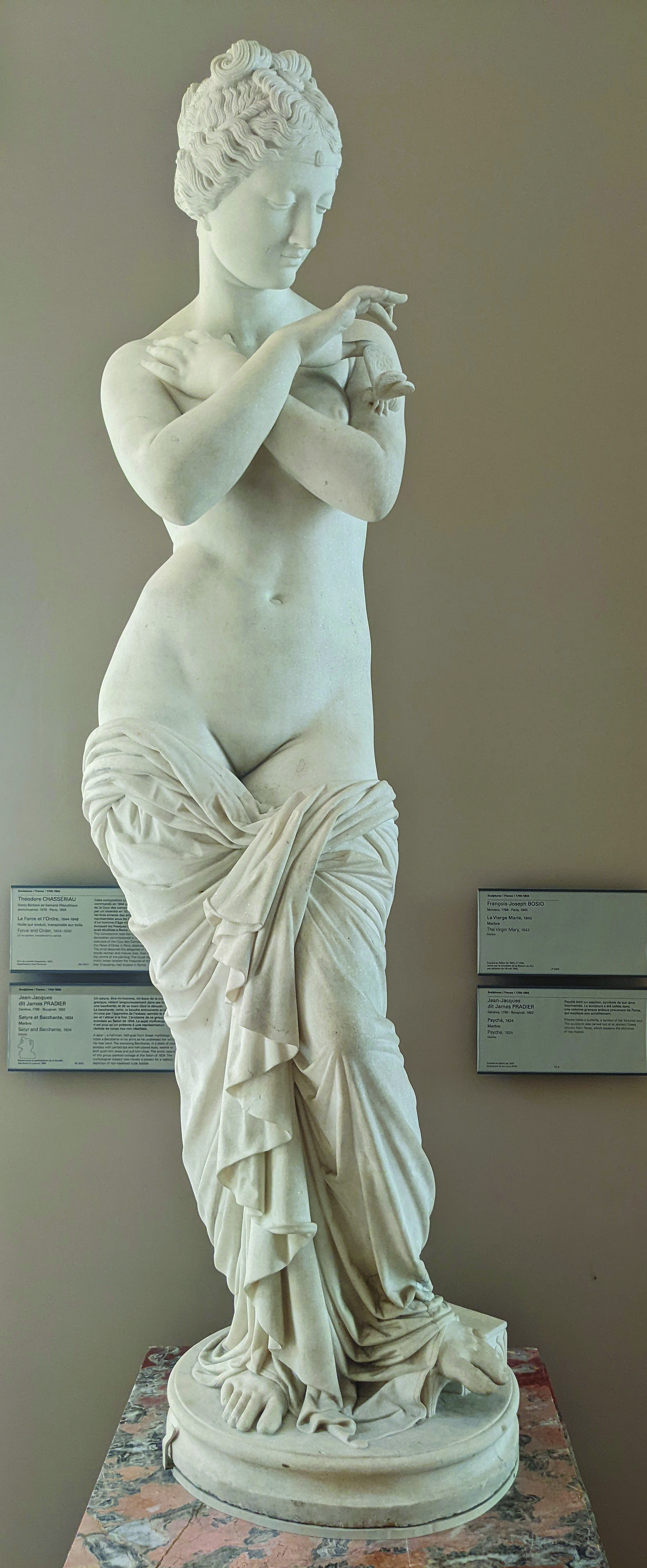
Psyché by James Pradier

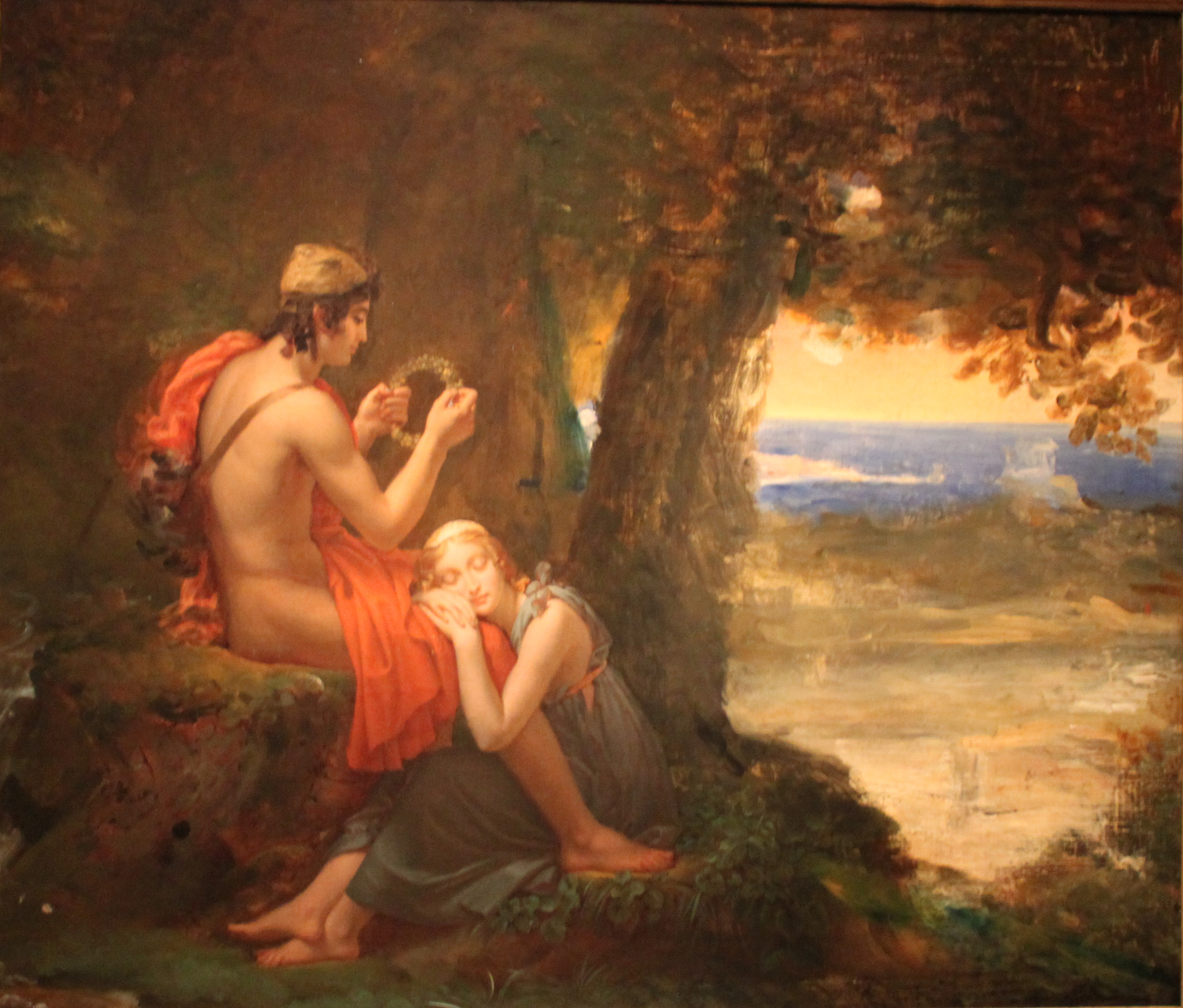
Daphnis and Chloe by François Gérard

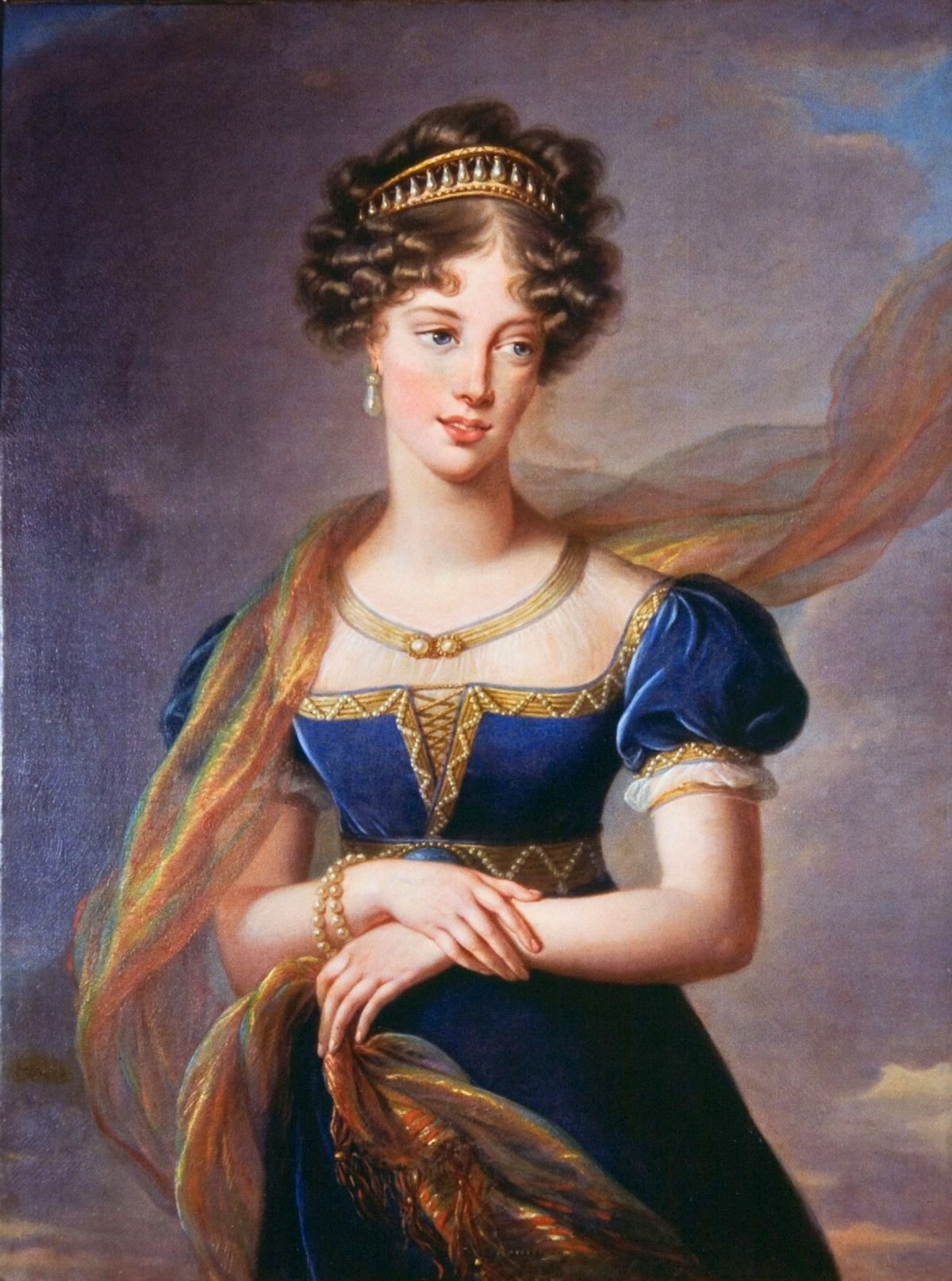
Portrait of the Duchess of Berry by Élisabeth Vigée Le Brun

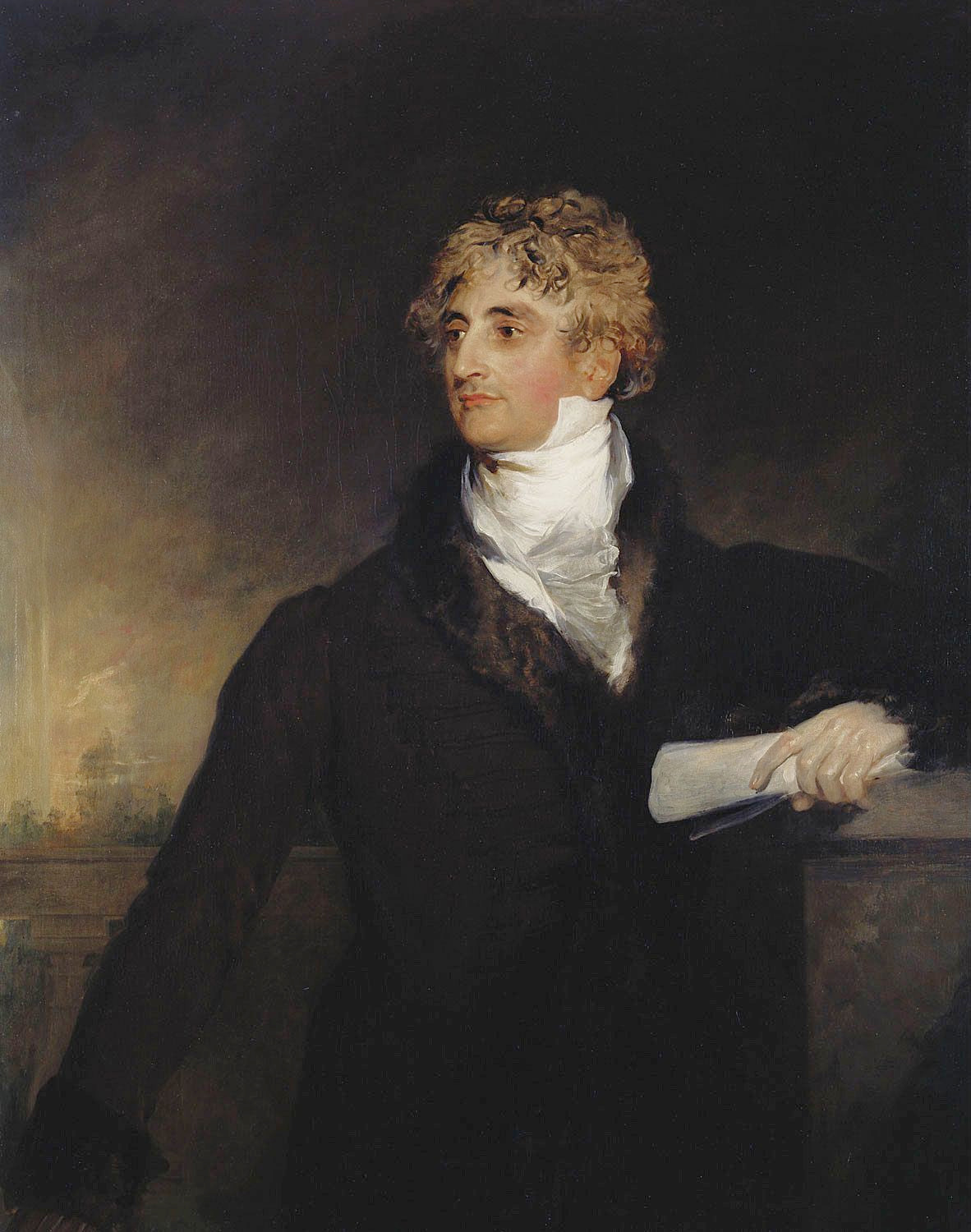
Portrait of the Duke of Richelieu by Thomas Lawrence

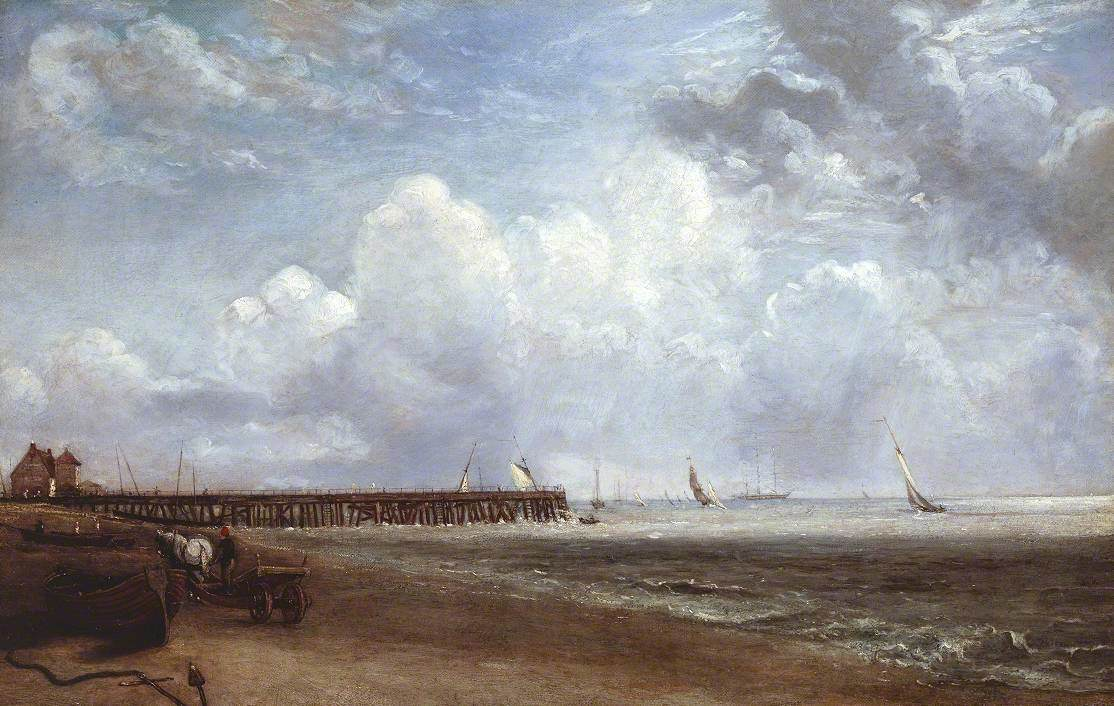
Yarmouth Jetty by John Constable

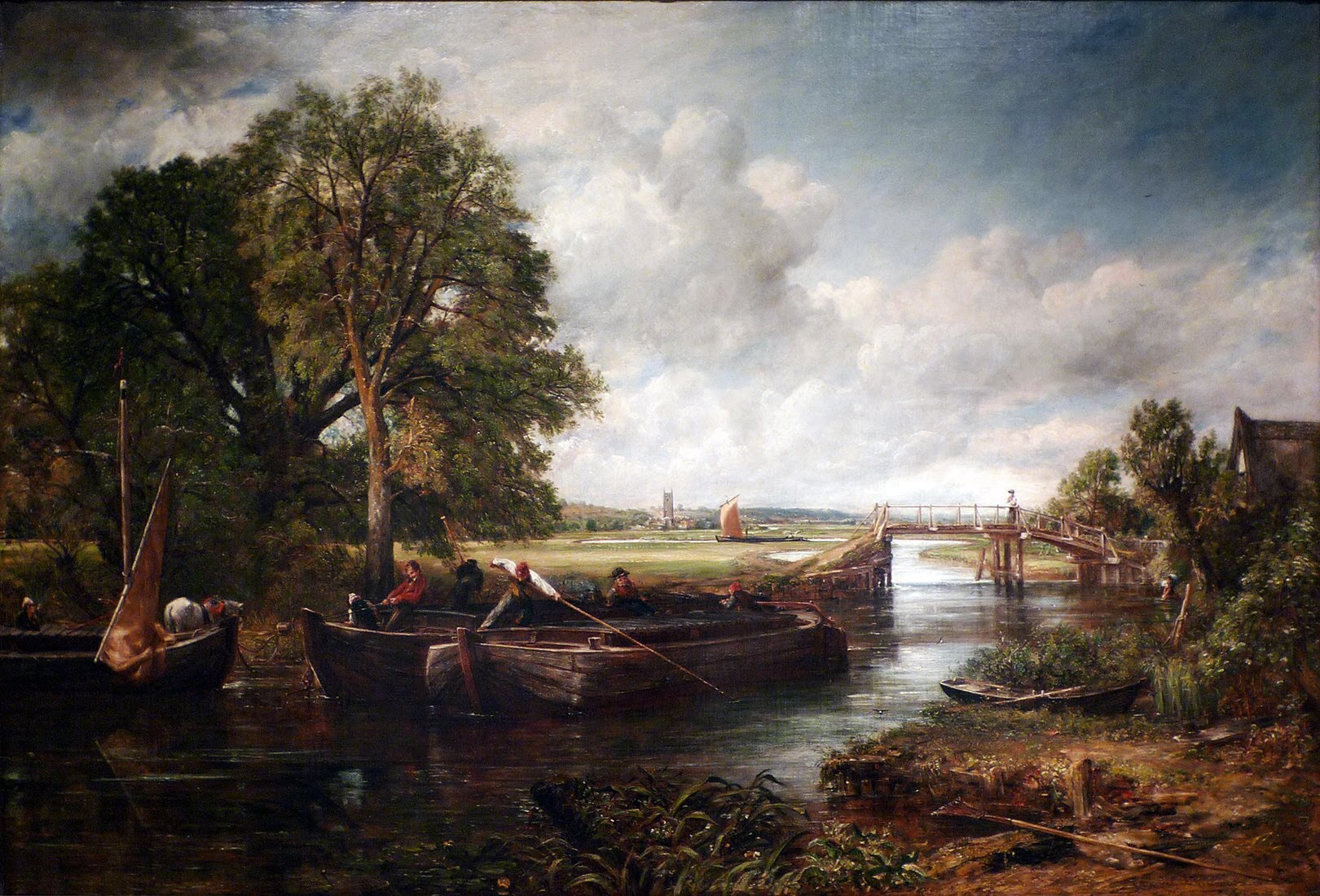
View on the Stour near Dedham by John Constable

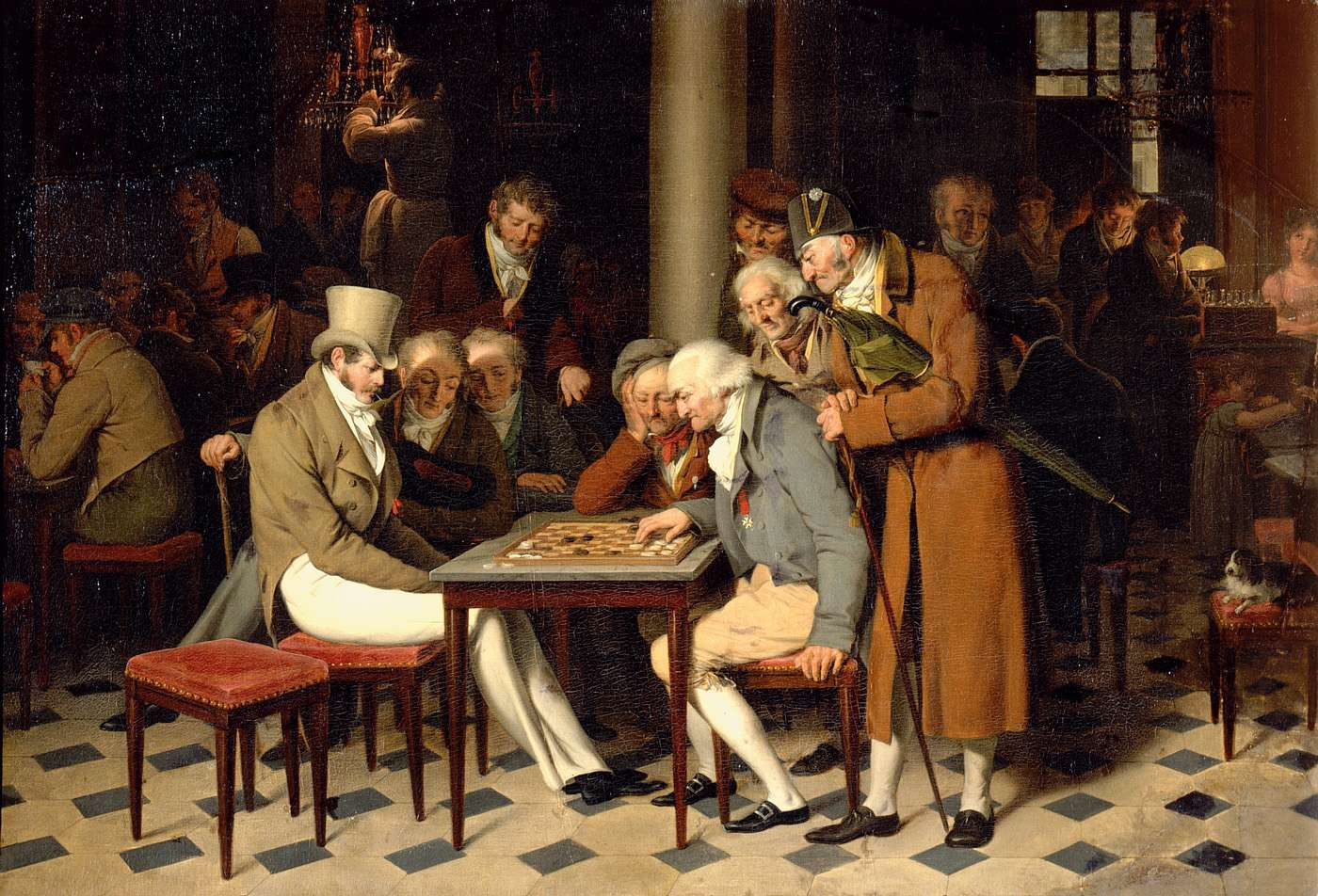
Checkers at the Lamblin Café in the Palais-Royal by Louis-Léopold Boilly

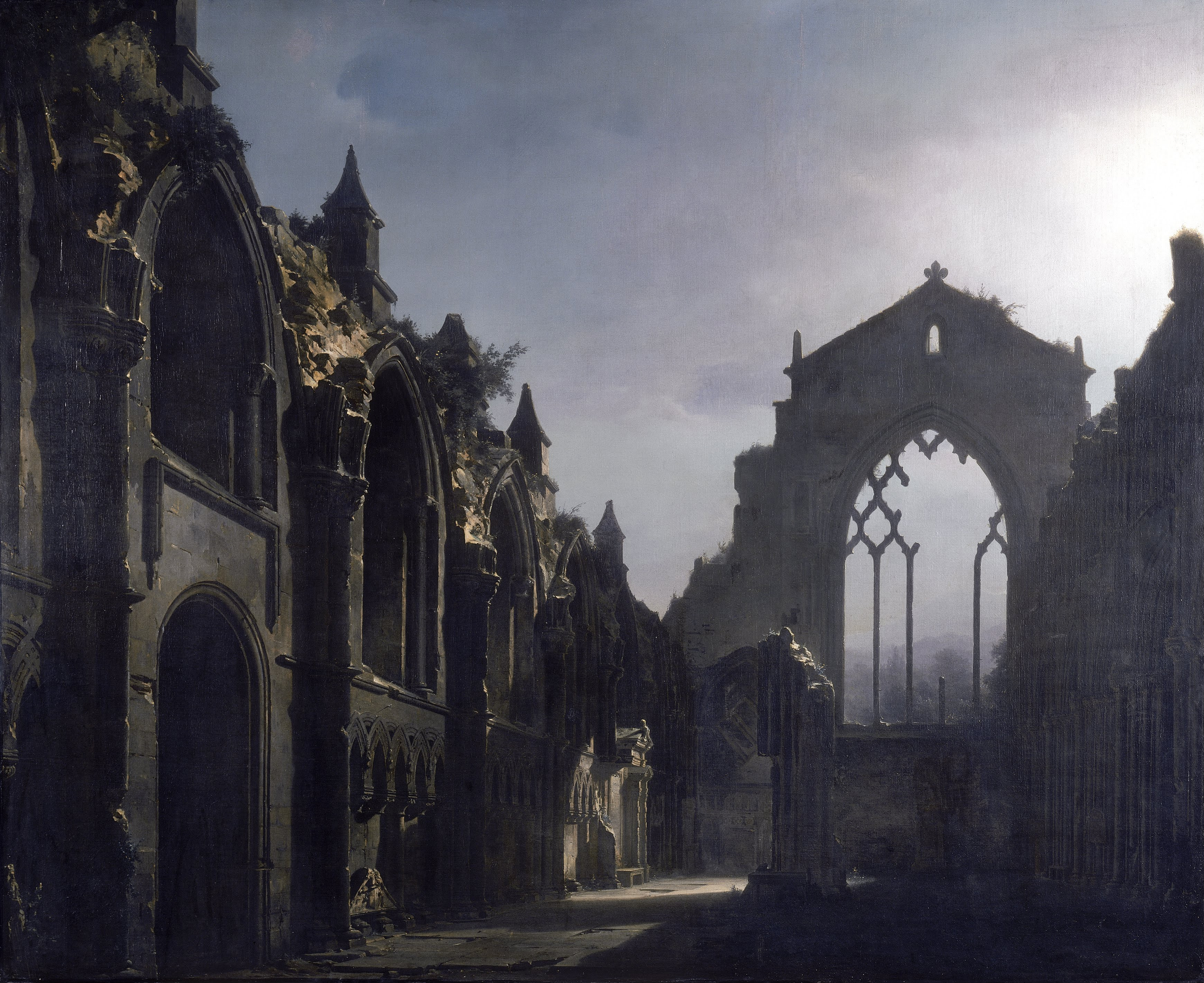
The Ruins of Holyrood Chapel by Louis Daguerre

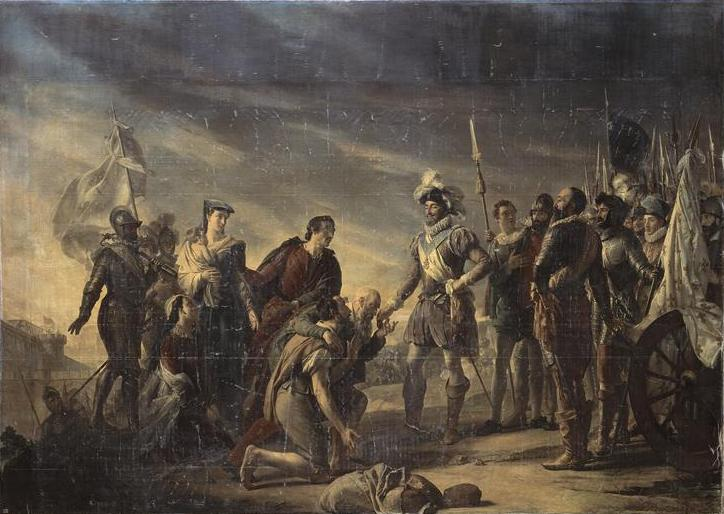
Henry IV During the Siege of Paris by Georges Rouget

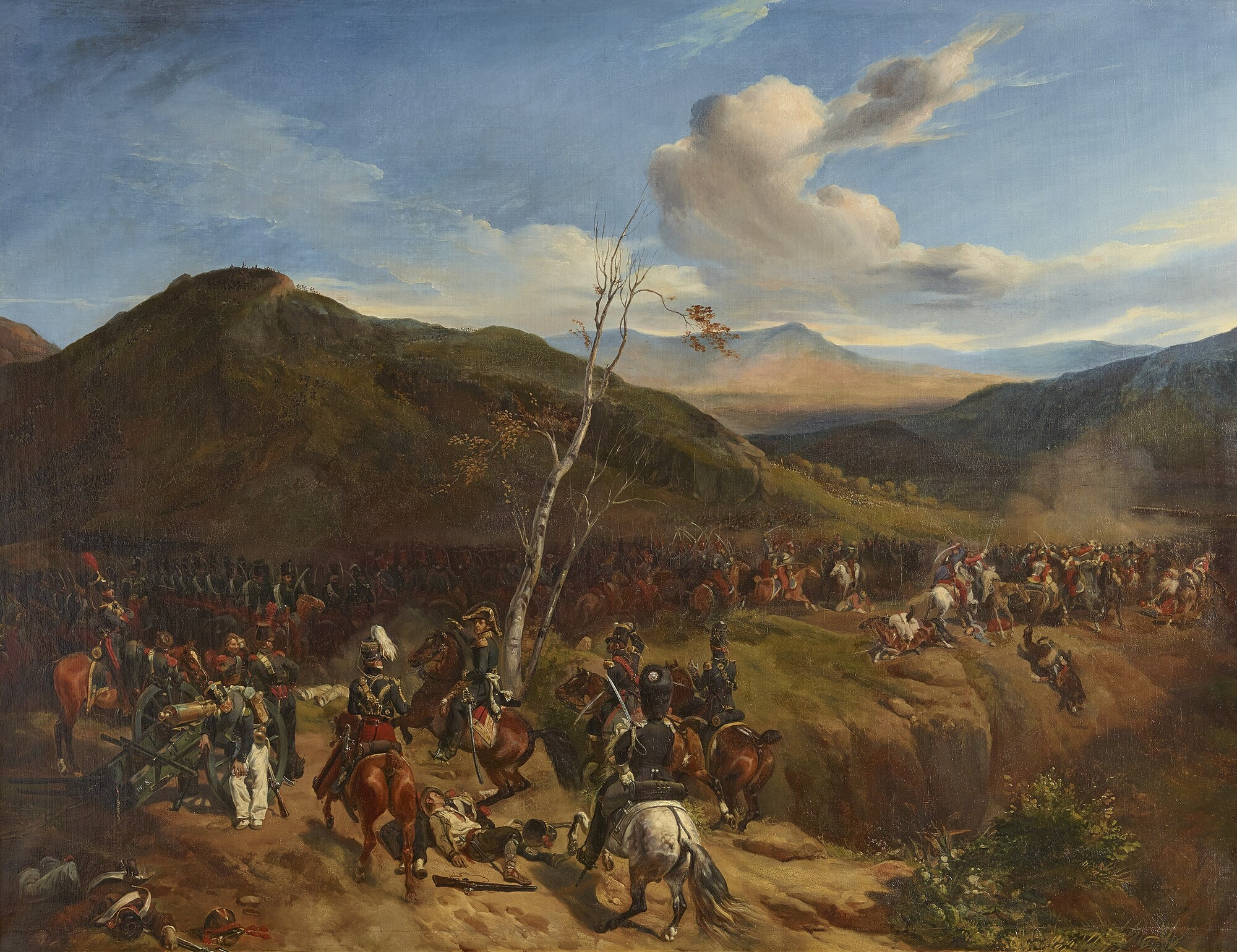
Combat de Puerto de Miravete by Eugène Lami

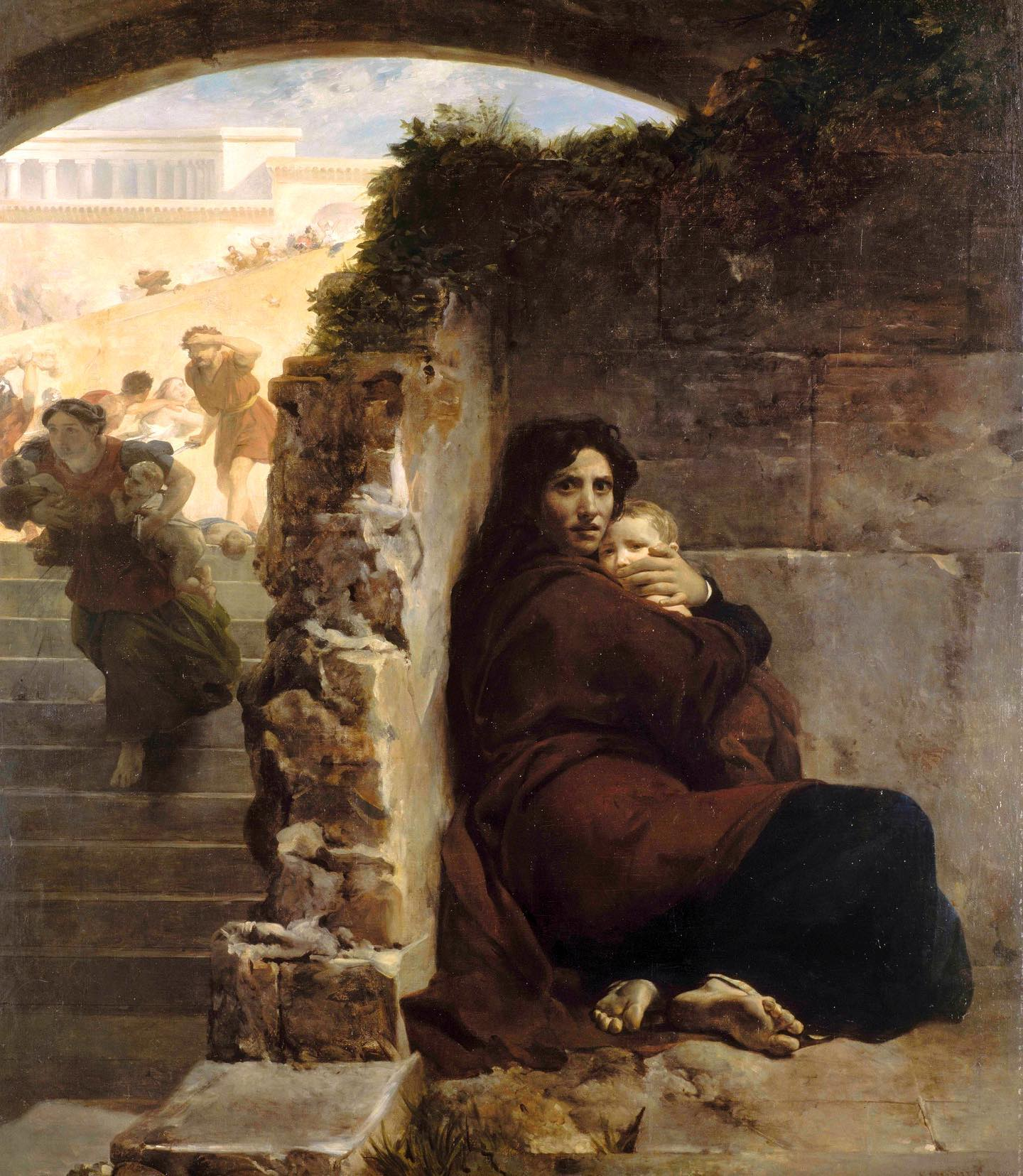
Massacre of the Innocents by Léon Cogniet

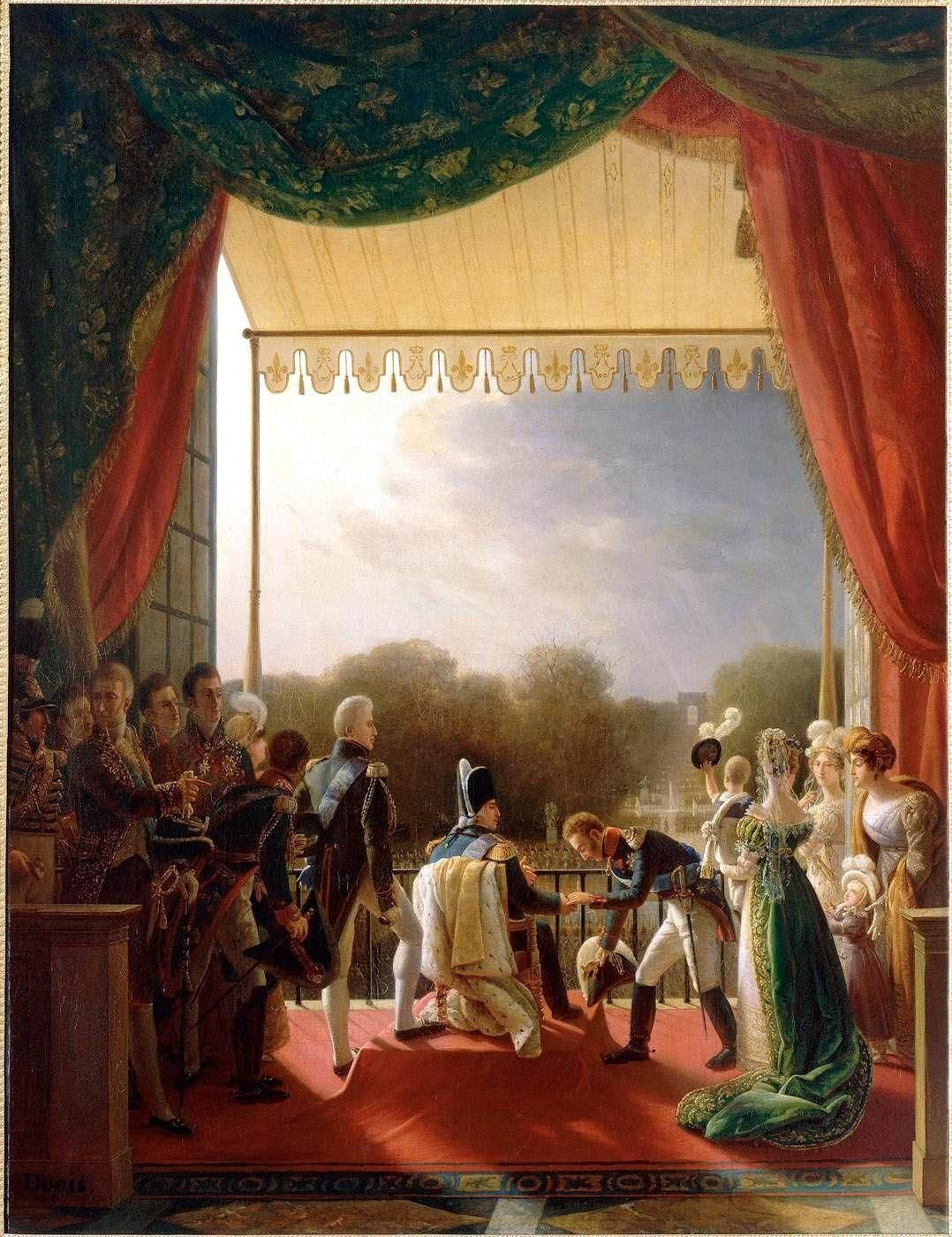
Louis XVIII and the French Royal by Louis Ducis

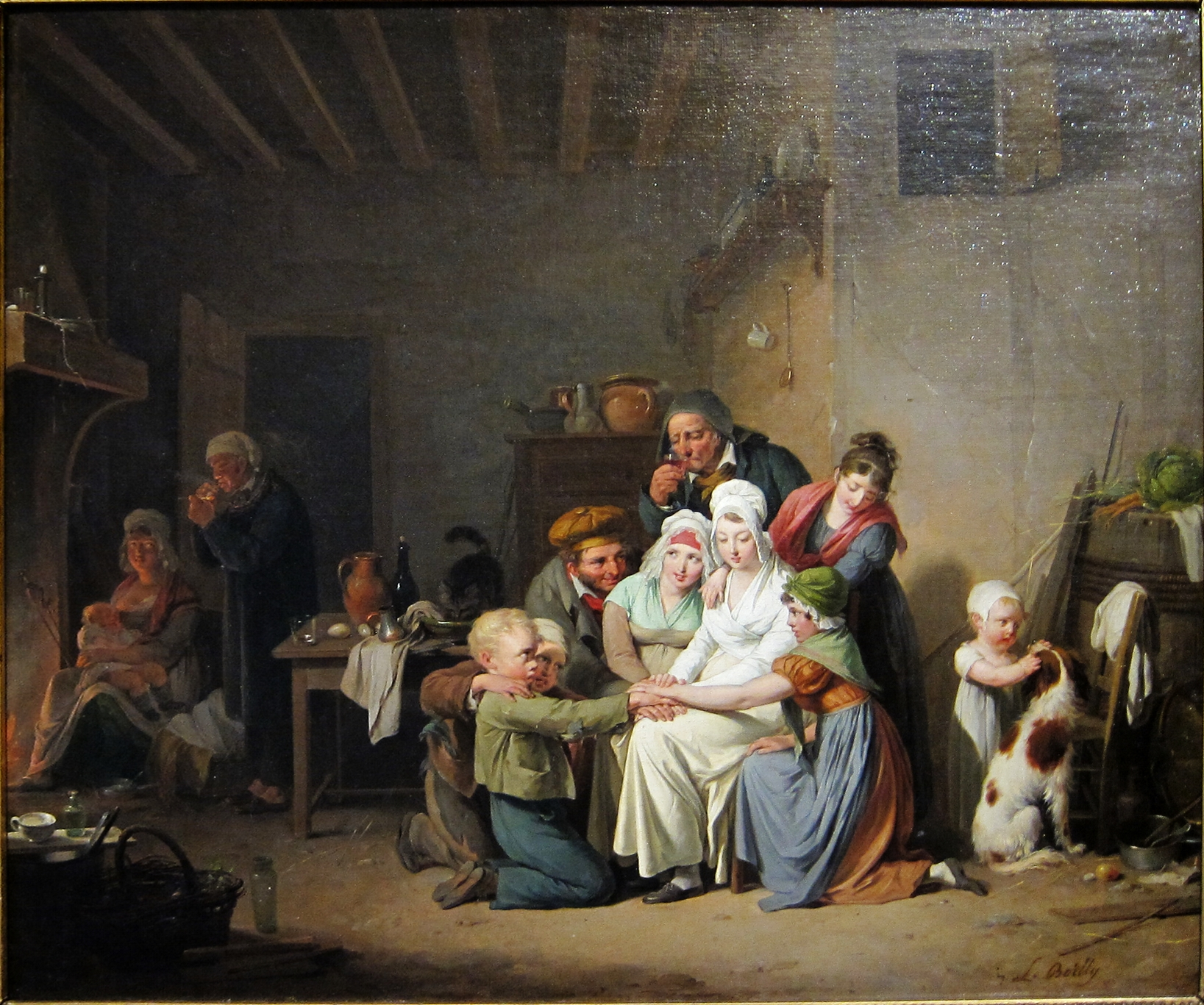
Mon pied de boeuf by Louis-Léopold Boilly

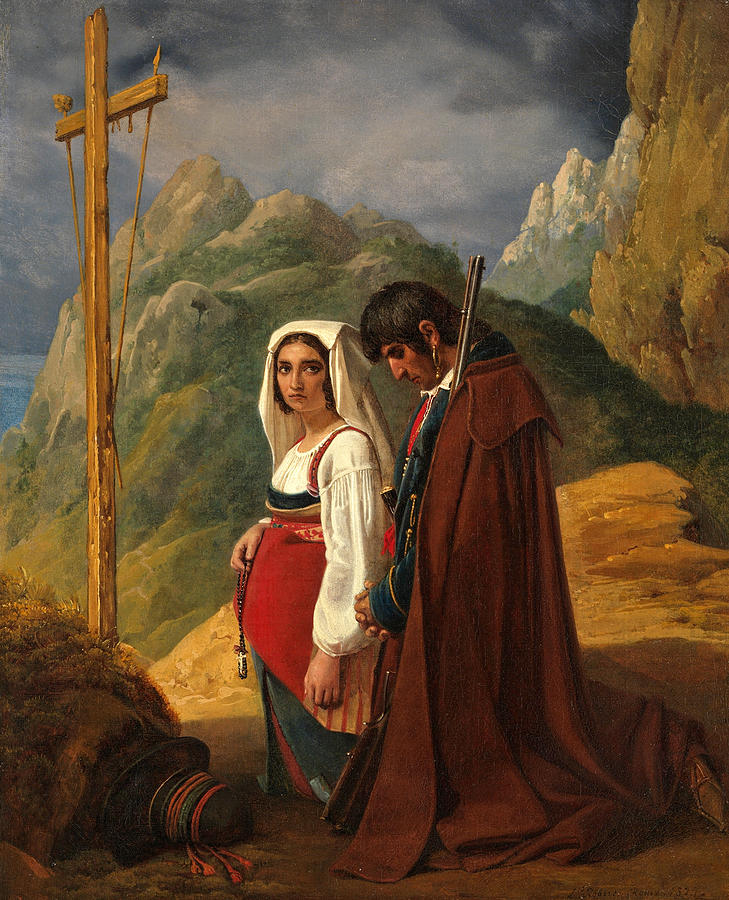
Brigand and His Wife in Prayer by Léopold Robert

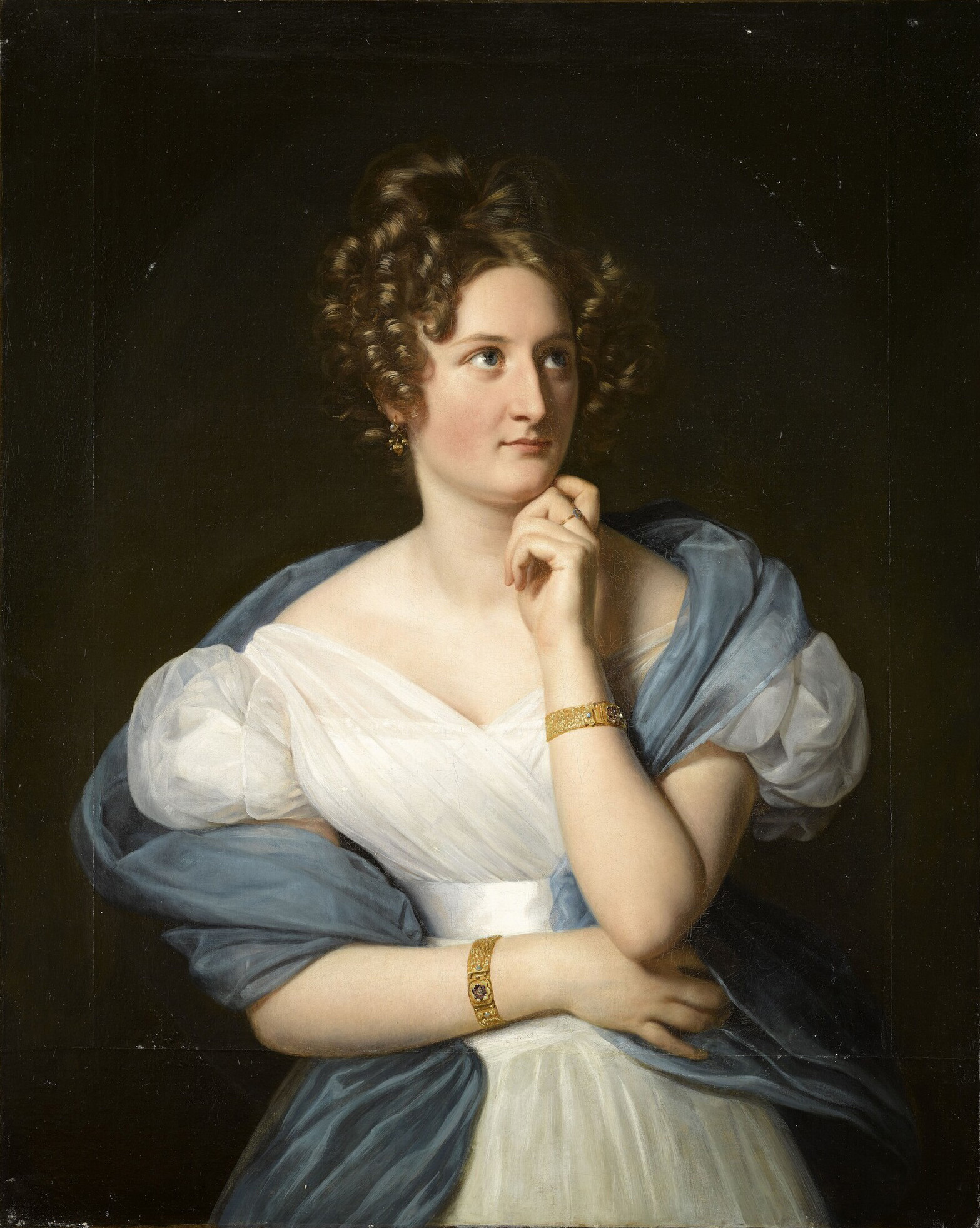
Portrait of Delphine de Girardin by Louis Hersent

Portrait of Jean-Antoine Chaptal by Antoine-Jean Gros

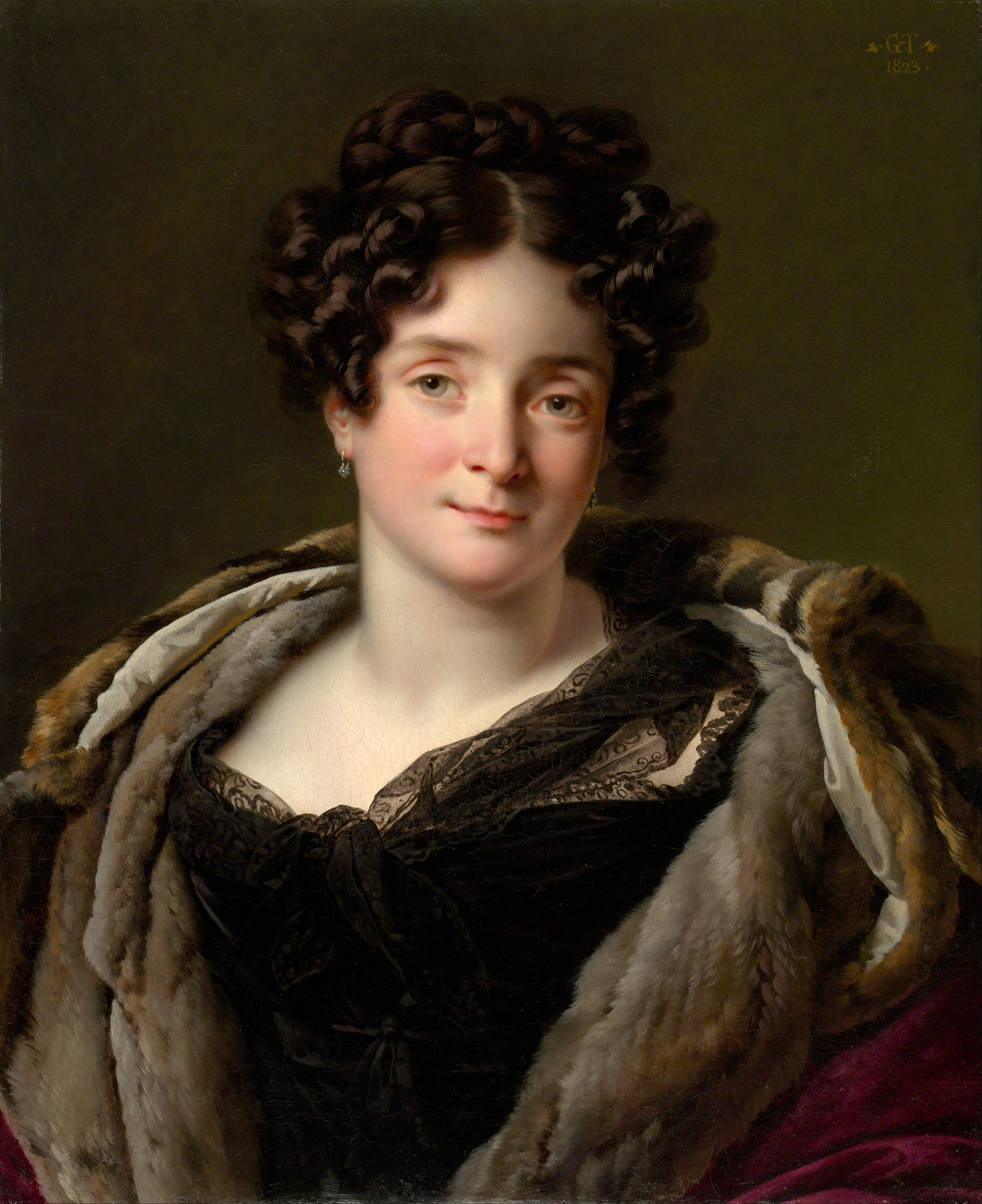
Portrait of Madame Reizet by Anne-Louis Girodet-Trioson

== Bibliography ==
- Charles, Victoria. Constable. Parkstone International, 2015.
- Gildea, Robert. Children of the Revolution: The French, 1799-1914. Harvard University Press, 2008.
- Harkett, Daniel & Hornstein, Katie (ed.) Horace Vernet and the Thresholds of Nineteenth-Century Visual Culture. Dartmouth College Press, 2017.
- Johnson, Paul. The Birth Of The Modern: World Society 1815-1830. Orion, 2013.
- Mansel, Philip. Dressed to Rule: Royal and Court Costume from Louis XIV to Elizabeth II. Yale University Press, 2005.
- May, Stephen J. Voyage of The Slave Ship: J.M.W. Turner's Masterpiece in Historical Context. McFarland, 2014
- Noon, Patrick & Bann, Stephen. Constable to Delacroix: British Art and the French Romantics. Tate, 2003.
- Wolohojian, Stephan & Tahinci, Anna. A Private Passion: 19th-century Paintings and Drawings from the Grenville L. Winthop Collection, Harvard University. Metropolitan Museum of Art, 2003.

== See also ==
- Category:Artworks exhibited at the Salon of 1824
