= Portrait of the Duke of Richelieu =

1818 painting by Thomas Lawrence

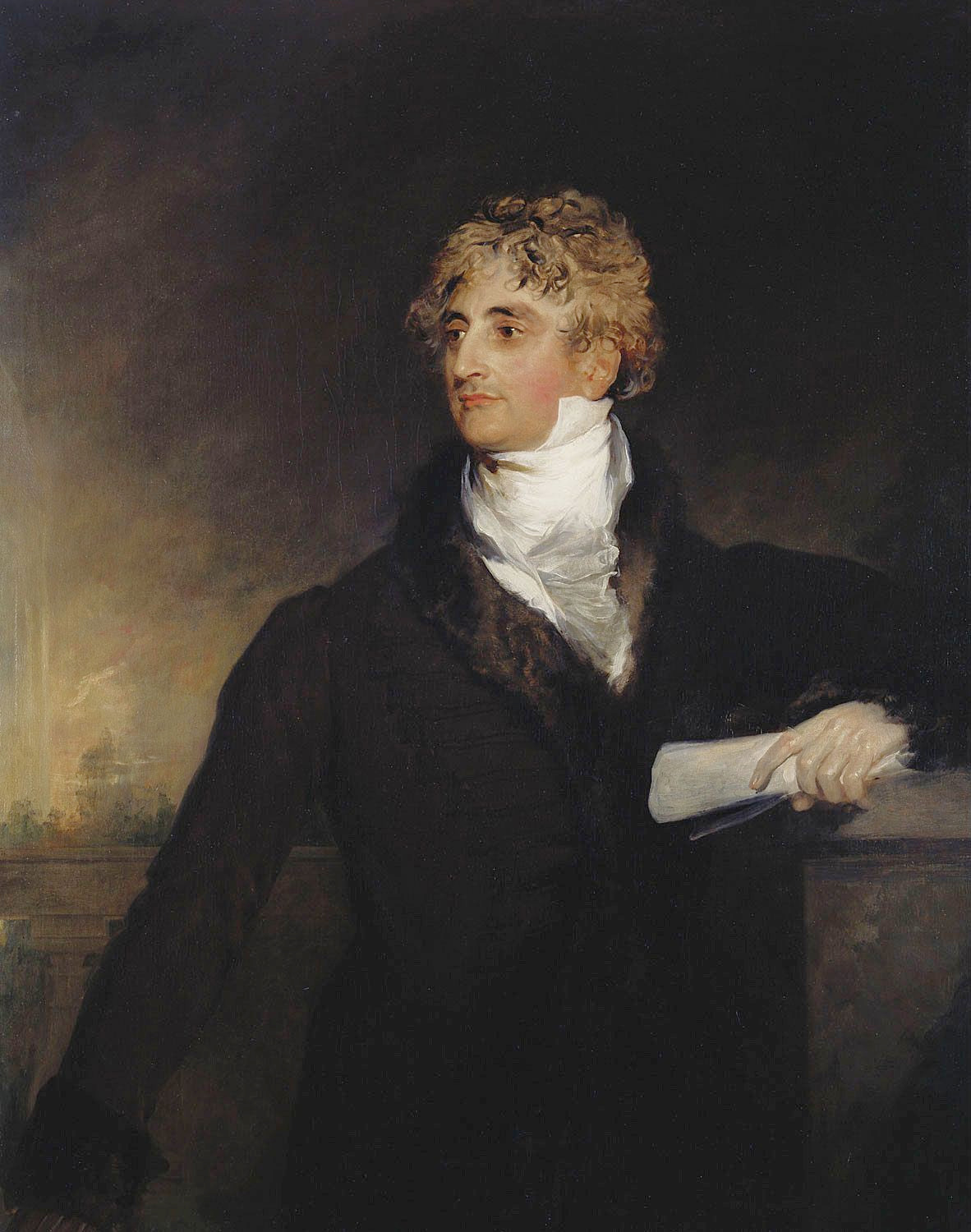
- Artist: Thomas Lawrence
- Year: 1818
- Type: Oil on canvas, portrait
- Dimensions: 134 cm × 107 cm (52.6 in × 42.3 in)
- Location: Royal Collection, Windsor Castle

The Duke of Richelieu is an 1818 portrait painting by the British artist Sir Thomas Lawrence of the French Prime Minister Armand Emmanuel de Vignerot du Plessis, 5th Duke of Richelieu. Richelieu was a leading statesman in Restoration France serving twice as premiere during the reign of Louis XVIII, having previously spent many years in exile. It was painted during the Congress of Aix-la-Chapelle.

Lawrence was the preeminent portrait painter of Regency Britain. He was commissioned by the Prince Regent to travel to Aix-la-Chapelle to paint European leaders gathered there. Since Napoleon's final defeat at the Battle of Waterloo, France had been subjected to Allied Occupation under the Duke of Wellington. At the Congress Richelieu accomplished his goal of securing the withdrawal of Allied troops in exchange for the payment of outstanding reparations. He also signed the Quintuple Alliance allowing France to become the fifth member of the post-war alliance of Austria, Britain, Prussia and Russia, part of the wider Concert of Europe.

The portrait shows the Duke in fashionable civilian dress holding a sheath of papers that suggest at his administrative duties. Depicted in the romantic style of the era, he is shown against a stormy background staring into the distance wearing "an expression of determination and weariness. but also of hope".

When Lawrence was invited to exhibit work at the Salon of 1824 in Paris he submitted a smaller version of the painting. The original is now part of the Royal Collection and hangs in the Waterloo Chamber of Windsor Castle along with other leading figures involved in the defeat of Napoleon and the postwar diplomatic congresses.

== Bibliography ==
- Cox, Cynthia. Talleyrand's Successor: Armand-Emmanuel Du Plessis, Duc de Richelieu. 1766-1822. Vanguard Press, 1959. ISBN 1014195829.
- De Graaf, Beatrice. Fighting Terror after Napoleon: How Europe Became Secure after 1815. Cambridge University Press, 2020. ISBN 1108842062.
- Haynes, Christine. Our Friends the Enemies. The Occupation of France after Napoleon. Harvard University Press, 2018. ISBN 0674972317.
- Noon, Patrick & Bann, Stephen. Constable to Delacroix: British Art and the French Romantics. Tate, 2003.ISBN 1854374591.
- Levey, Michael. Sir Thomas Lawrence. Yale University Press, 2005. ISBN 0300109989.
