= Portrait of Jean-Antoine Chaptal =

Painting by Antoine-Jean Gros

- Artist: Antoine-Jean Gros
- Year: 1824
- Type: Oil on canvas, portrait painting
- Dimensions: 136.5 cm × 114.3 cm (53.7 in × 45.0 in)
- Location: Cleveland Museum of Art; Ohio

Portrait of Jean-Antoine Chaptal is an 1824 portrait painting by the French artist Antoine-Jean Gros. It depicts the French scientist and politician Jean-Antoine Chaptal who served as Minister of the Interior from 1800 to 1804 during the French Consulate. He is shown writing his memoirs and dressed in the robes of the Académie Française with the sash of the Order of Saint Michael and the Legion of Honour. It was the only painting exhibited by Gros at the Salon of 1824 at the Louvre, likely due to his heavy involvement with the decoration of the Panthéon cupola. His sole work was nonetheless widely praised by critics. Today the painting is in the collection of the Cleveland Museum of Art in Ohio, having been purchased in 1964.

== Bibliography ==
- Burton, June K. Napoleon and the Woman Question: Discourses of the Other Sex in French Education, Medicine, and Medical Law 1799-1815. Texas Tech University Press, 2007.
- Chong, Alan. European & American Painting in the Cleveland Museum of Art. Cleveland Museum of Art, 1993.
- Noon, Patrick & Bann, Stephen. Constable to Delacroix: British Art and the French Romantics. Tate, 2003.
