= Portrait of Marshal Saint-Cyr =

Painting by Horace Vernet

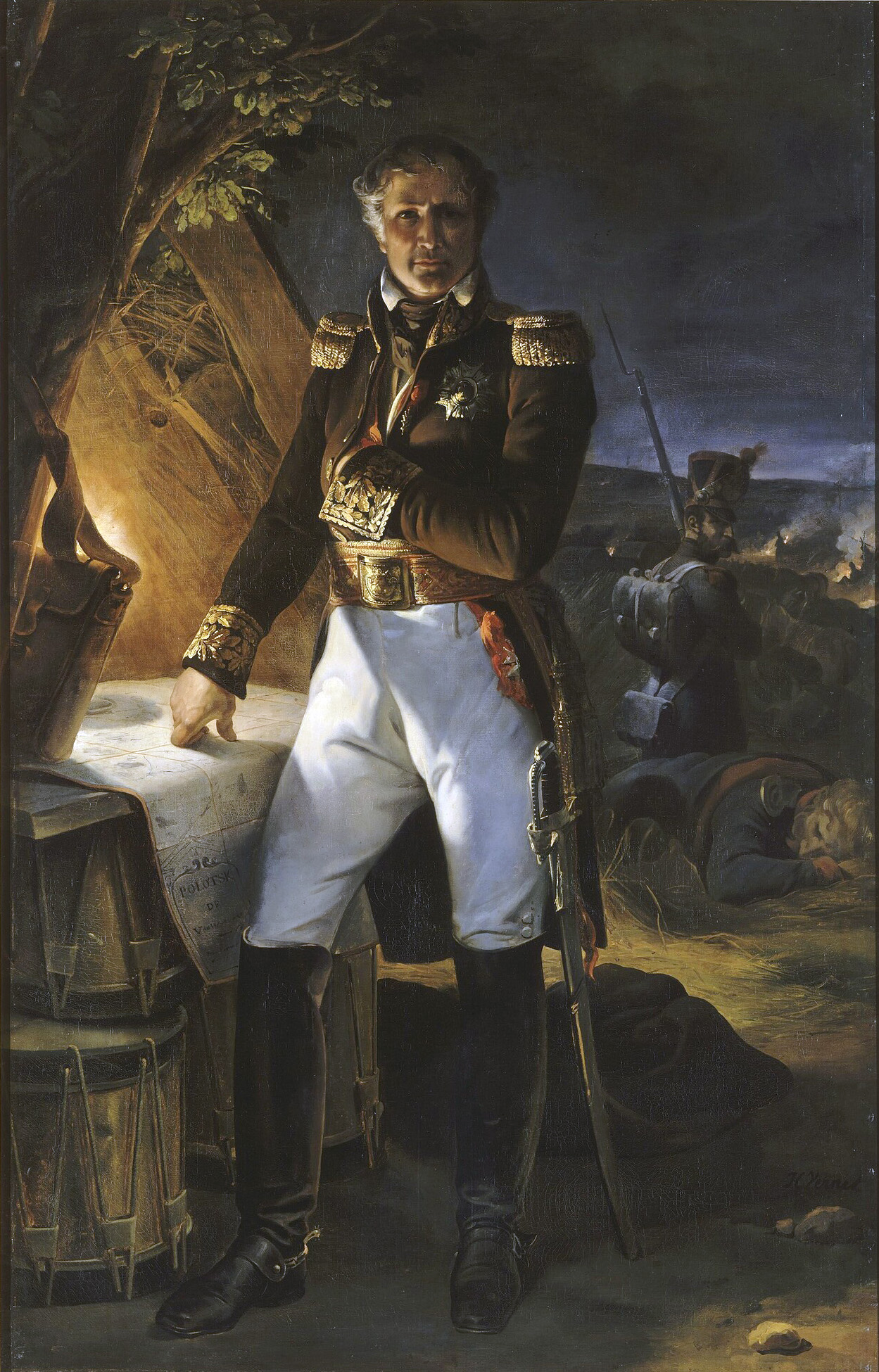
- Artist: Horace Vernet
- Year: 1821
- Type: Oil on canvas, portrait painting
- Dimensions: 215 cm × 140 cm (85 in × 55 in)
- Location: Palace of Versailles; Versailles

Portrait of Marshal Saint-Cyr is an 1821 portrait painting by the French artist Horace Vernet. It depicts Laurent de Gouvion Saint-Cyr, a former Marshal of the Empire under Napoleon. In 1817 he was appointed as Minister of War during the post-war Restoration era.

Rather than the more common state portrait Saint-Cyr is shown as a man of action, lit by lamplight in a military camp planning the next day's campaigning. Vernet exhibited at the Salon of 1824 in Paris. Today it is in the collection of the Palace of Versailles.

== Bibliography ==
- Boime, Albert. A Social History of Modern Art, Volume 3: Art in Age of Counterrevolution. University of Chicago Press, 2004.
- Chaudonneret, Marie-Claude. L'état et les artistes: de la restauration à la monarchie de Juillet (1815-1833). Flammarion, 1999.
- Gordon, Alden R. Masterpieces from Versailles: Three Centuries of French Portraiture. Smithsonian Institution, 1983
- Harkett, Daniel & Hornstein, Katie (ed.) Horace Vernet and the Thresholds of Nineteenth-Century Visual Culture. Dartmouth College Press, 2017.
- Ruutz-Rees, Janet Emily. Horace Vernet. Scribner and Welford, 1880.
