= 1818 in art =

Events in the year 1818 in Art.

== Events ==
- 4 May – The Royal Academy Exhibition of 1818 opens at Somerset House in London.
- 29 September – Commissioned by the Prince Regent, Sir Thomas Lawrence travels to Aachen to paint portraits of those present at the third congress.

== Works ==
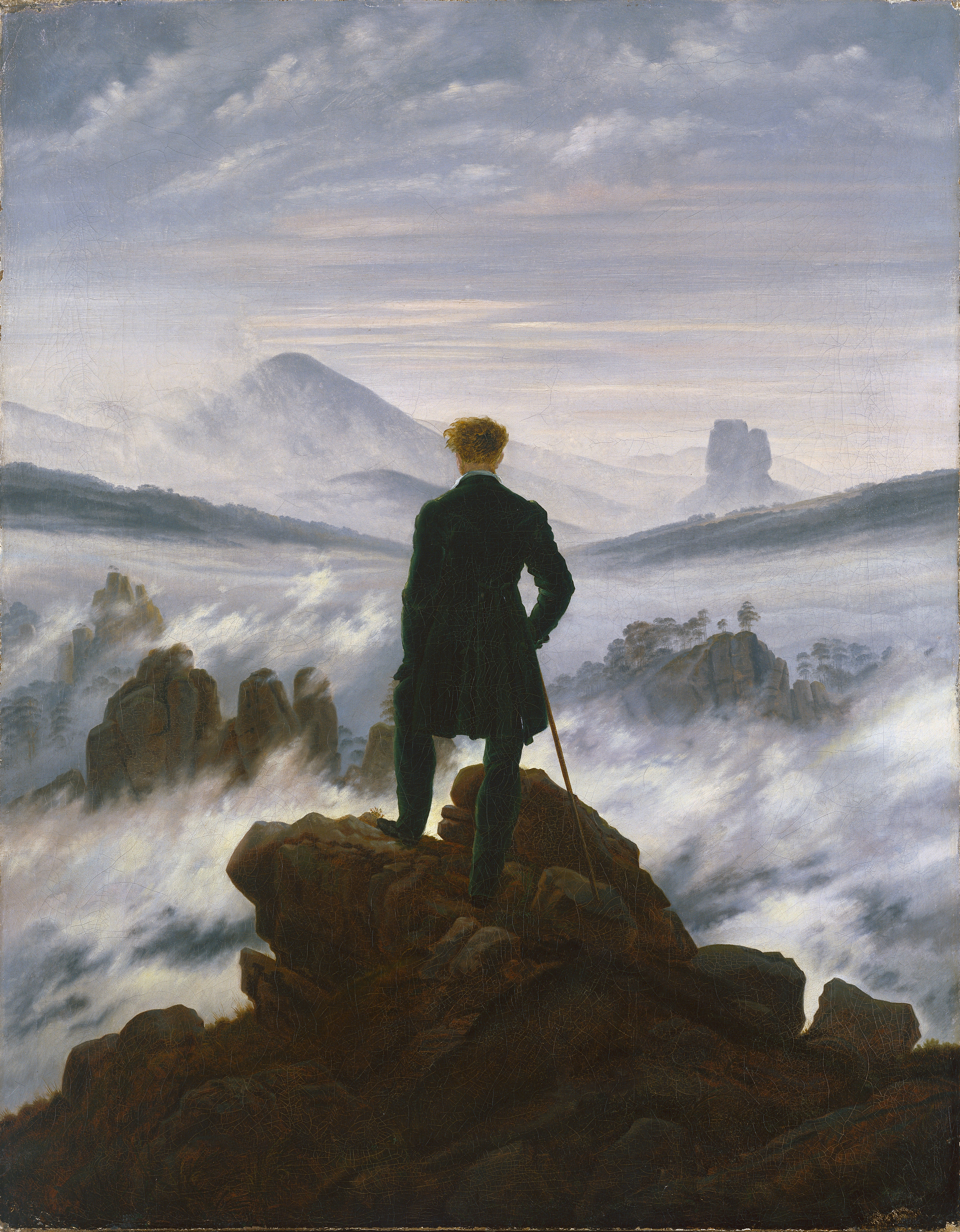
Wanderer above the Sea of Fog by Caspar David Friedrich.

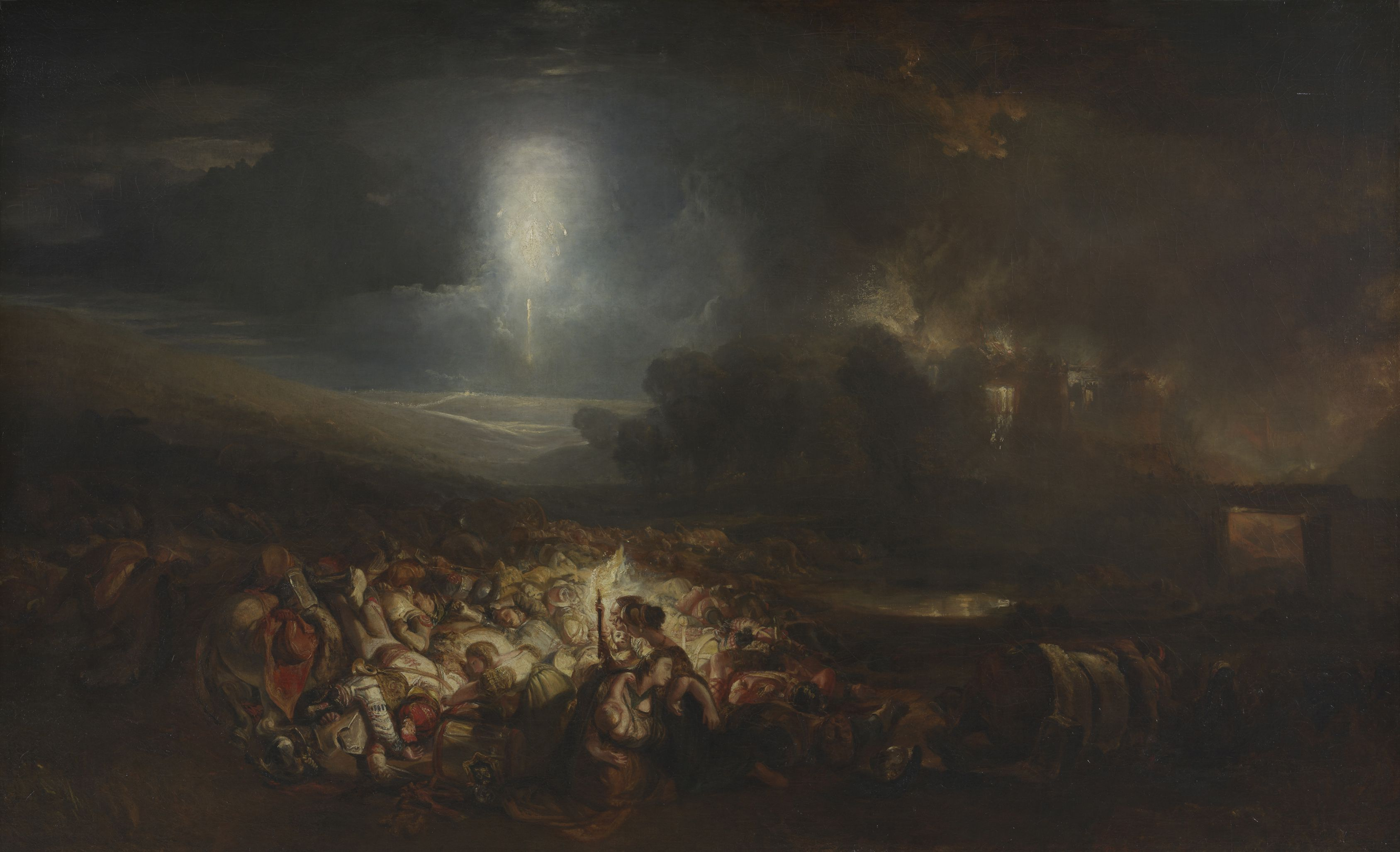
The Field of Waterloo by William Turner

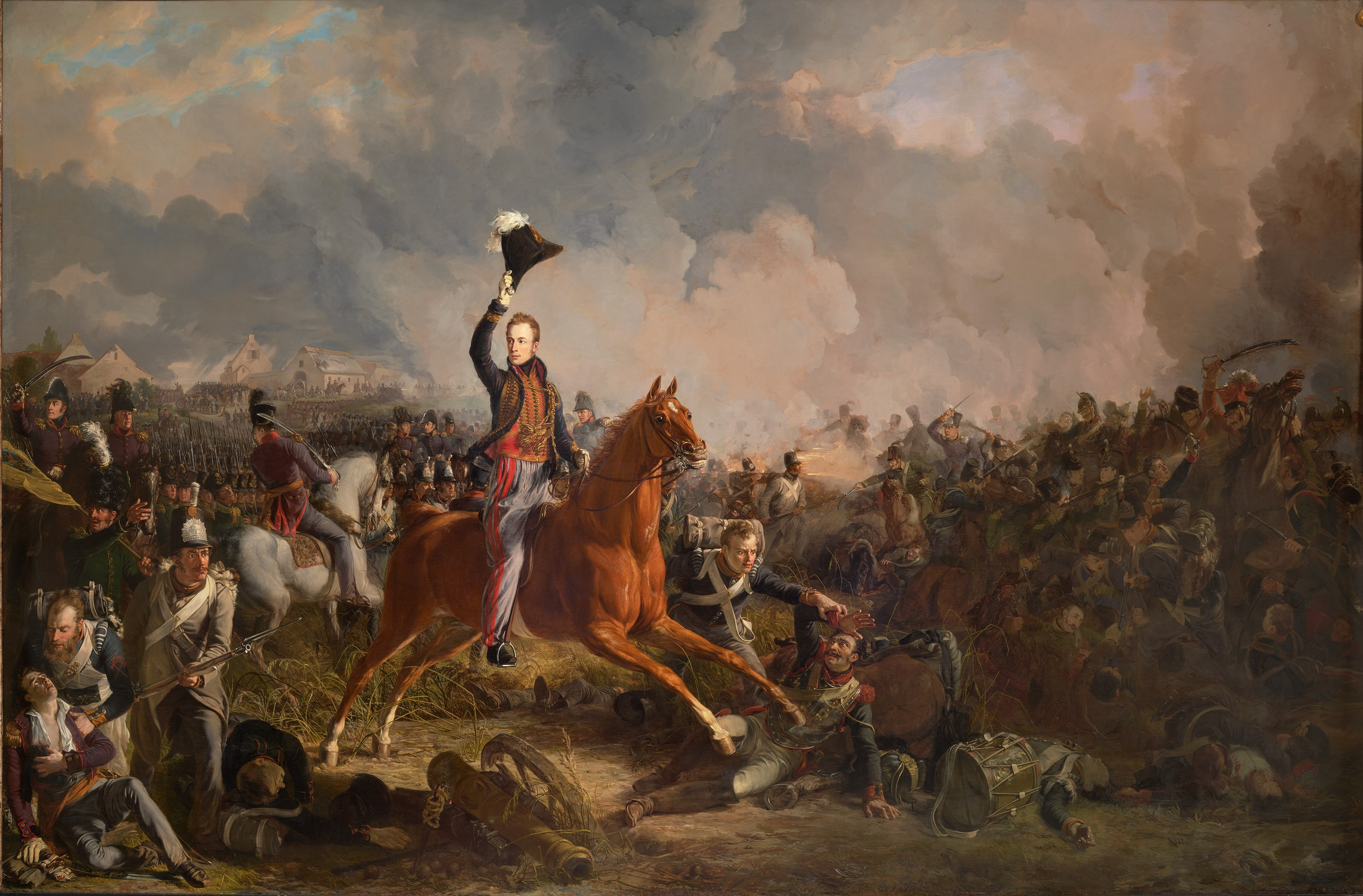
The Prince of Orange at Quatre Bras by Jan Willem Pieneman

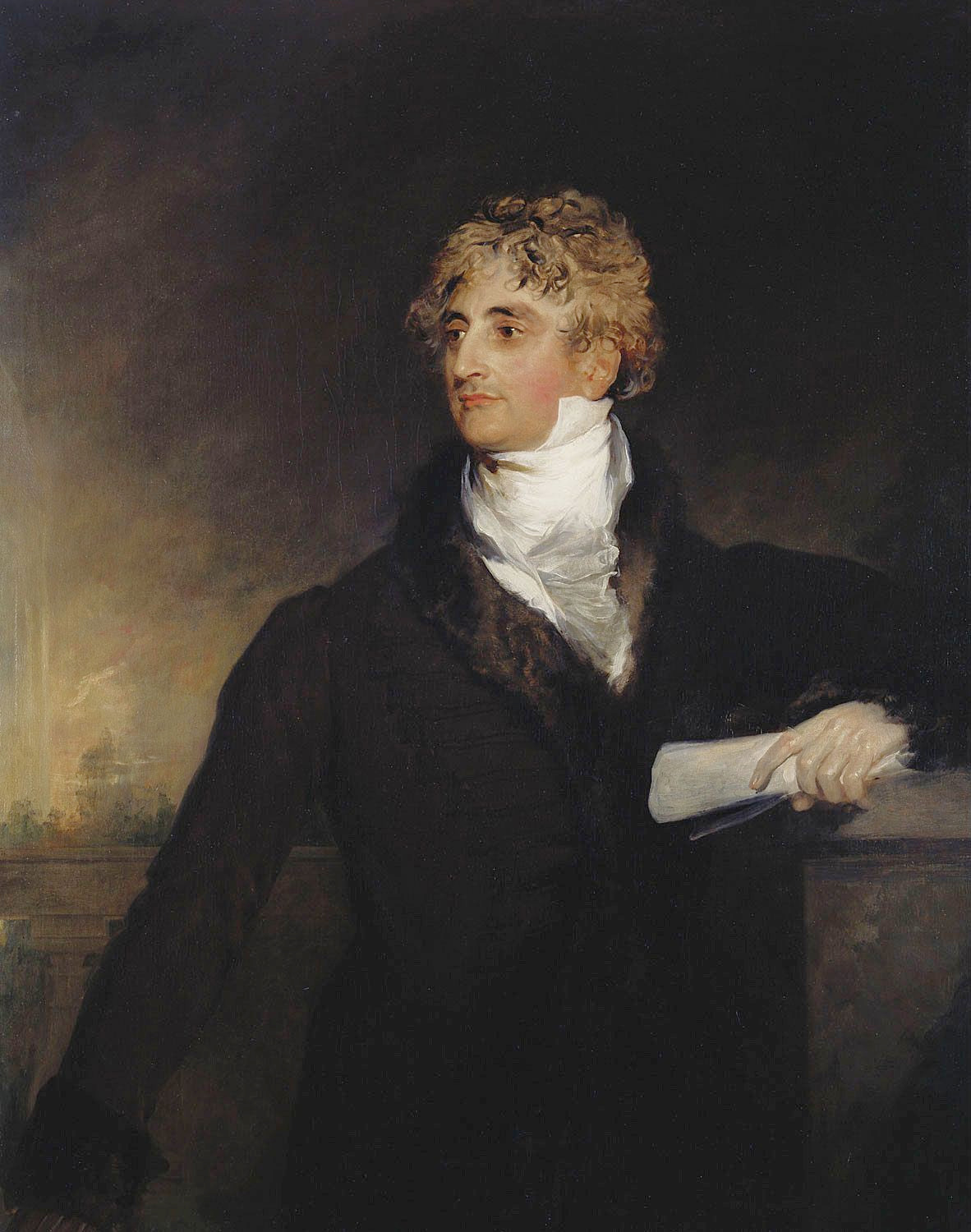
Portrait of the Duke of Richelieu by Thomas Lawrence

- Jean Alaux – The Studio of Ingres in Rome
- William Beechey – Portrait of Augusta, Duchess of Cambridge
- René Théodore Berthon – Portrait of Lady Morgan
- Augustus Wall Callcott – The Mouth of the Tyne
- John Constable – Willy Lott's House from the Stour
- Charles de Steuben – Napoleon's Return from Elba
- William Etty – Manlius Hurled From The Rock
- Caspar David Friedrich
  - Chalk Cliffs on Rügen
  - Seaside by Moonlight
  - Wanderer above the Sea of Fog
- Théodore Géricault – Evening: Landscape with an Aqueduct
- Antoine-Jean Gros – The Embarkation of the Duchess of Angoulême at Pauillac
- Henry Howard – The Apotheosis of Princess Charlotte
- Jean Auguste Dominique Ingres
  - The Death of Leonardo da Vinci
  - Philip V of Spain Investing Marshal Berwick with the Golden Fleece
- Thomas Lawrence
  - Portrait of Alexander I of Russia
  - Portrait of Count Nesselrode
  - Portrait of the Duke of Richelieu
  - Portrait of Frances Vane
  - Portrait of Frederick William III of Prussia
  - Portrait of Karl von Hardenberg
- Jan Willem Pieneman – The Prince of Orange at Quatre Bras
- Thomas Phillips – Portrait of Francis Leggatt Chantrey
- Rolinda Sharples – The Cloakroom, Clifton Assembly Rooms
- Thomas Sully – Major John Biddle
- William Turner – The Field of Waterloo
- David Wilkie
  - The Errand Boy
  - The Penny Wedding

== Births ==
- January 21 – Alexander Joseph Daiwaille, Dutch portrait painter (died 1888)
- January 26 – Amédée de Noé, French caricaturist and lithographer (died 1879)
- January 28 – Alfred Stevens, English sculptor (died 1875)
- April 3 – Jean-François Portaels, Flemish orientalist painter (died 1895)
- April 14 – Louisa Beresford, Marchioness of Waterford, French-born British Pre-Raphaelite watercolorist (died 1891)
- May 24 – John Henry Foley, Irish sculptor (died 1874)
- June 13 – Jean-Jules Allasseur, French sculptor (died 1903)
- June 21 – Sir Richard Wallace, 1st Baronet, born Richard Johnson, English francophile art collector and philanthropist (died 1890)
- December 7 – Georg Decker, Austro-Hungarian portrait painter (died 1894)
- probable – Alexander Hunter Murray, Scottish-born Canadian fur trader and artist (died 1874)

== Deaths ==
- January 5 – Marcello Bacciarelli, Italian painter (born 1731)
- February 28 – Anne Vallayer-Coster, French painter (born 1744)
- March 7 – Samuel Cotes, English painter of miniature portraits also working in crayons (born 1734)
- March 15 – Karl Postl, Austrian painter (born 1769)
- March 24 – Humphry Repton, English garden designer and artist (born 1752)
- April – George Bullock, English sculptor (born 1777)
- August 16 – Carl Frederik von Breda, Swedish painter to the Swedish court (born 1759)
- October 4 – Josef Abel, Austrian historical painter and etcher (born 1768)
- November 1 – Marie-Gabrielle Capet, French painter (born 1761)
- November 5 – Heinrich Füger, German portrait and historical painter (born 1751)
- November 19 – Shiba Kōkan, Japanese painter and printmaker (born 1747)
- December 10 – Hubert Maurer, Austrian painter of portraits and religious themes (born 1738)
- date unknown – Francesco Antonio Franzoni, Italian sculptor (born 1734)
