= Craeyvanger =

Craeyvanger is a surname. Notable people with the surname include:

- Gerardus Craeyvanger (1775–1855), Dutch violin player and baritone
- Gijsbertus Craeyvanger (1810–1895), Dutch painter
- Reinier Craeyvanger (1812–1880), Dutch painter and etcher
