= The Triumvirate Assuming Power on Behalf of the Prince of Orange =

Painting by Jan Willem Pieneman

The Triumvirate Assuming Power on behalf of the Prince of Orange
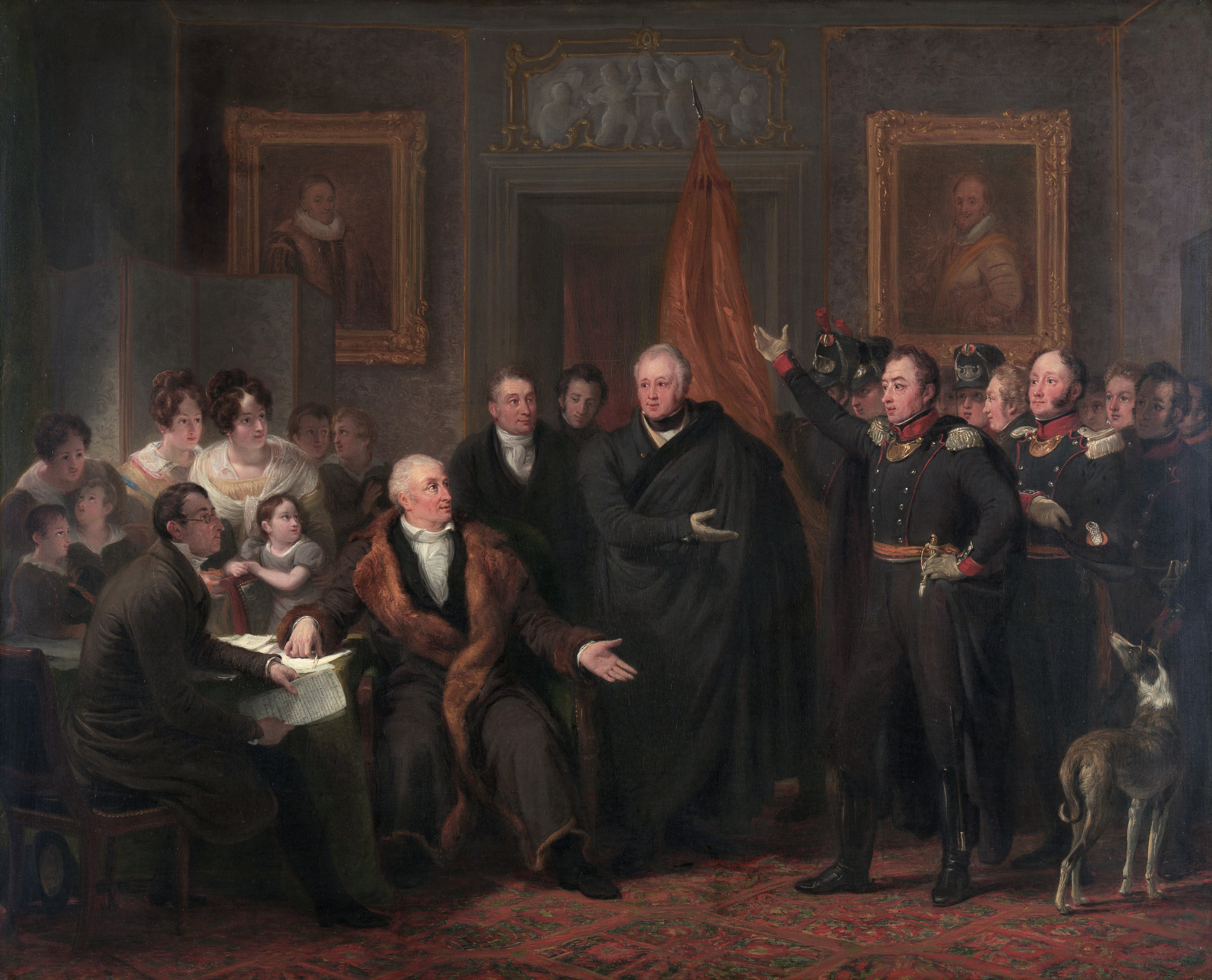
- Artist: Jan Willem Pieneman
- Year: 1828
- Type: Oil on canvas
- Dimensions: 70 cm × 86.5 cm (28 in × 34.1 in)
- Location: Rijksmuseum, Amsterdam

The Triumvirate Assuming Power on Behalf of the Prince of Orange (Dutch: De aanvaarding van het Hoog Bewind) is an 1828 history painting by the Dutch artist Jan Willem Pieneman. It depicts a scene in The Hague on 20 November 1813 during a Dutch uprising against rule by Napoleon's French Empire. The Triumvirate of 1813 assumed power in the name of William, Prince of Orange.

Orange, who had been in exile for many years, returned to lead the country shortly afterwards. Pieneman had enjoyed success with his earlier patriotic depictions of the conflict with The Prince of Orange at Quatre Bras (1818) and The Battle of Waterloo (1824). Today it is in the collection of the Rijksmuseum in Amsterdam.

== Bibliography ==
- Meijer, Emile R. Treasures from the Rijksmuseum Amsterdam. Scala, 1985.
- Reynolds, Luke. Who Owned Waterloo?: Battle, Memory, and Myth in British History, 1815–1852. Oxford University Press, 2022.
