= William Thornhill (British Army officer) =

William Thornhill (1768 – 9 December 1851) was a British Army officer of the Peninsular War and the Waterloo Campaign. His nephew was the politician William Pole Thornhill.

== Life ==
Born in Derbyshire as the second son of Bache Thornhill of Stanton Hall, he became a Lieutenant in the 23rd Regiment of Foot on 28 February 1800 before rising to Captain on 5 May 1804, both whilst serving in the Peninsula. On 12 June 1806 he transferred to the 7th (The Queen's Own) Regiment of (Light) Dragoons (Hussars). In 1808 he commanded a twelve-man detachment of the regiment at Sahagún and fought at Benavente. He was promoted to Major on 8 April 1813.

He also fought with the 7th Hussars at Orthez on 27 February 1814, leading a charge, capturing a French colour and being wounded. However, he was disgraced in March that year when he failed to prevent an incursion of brigands at Villeneuve, being captured in the process but escaping.

He was wounded at the Battle of Waterloo whilst aide de camp to Lord Uxbridge and was made a Brevet Lieutenant Colonel on the day of the battle. That rank was made substantive on 12 August 1819 when he was put in command of the regiment, a command he held until retirement in 1826. An 1821 oil sketch of him for Jan Willem Pieneman's The Battle of Waterloo was acquired by the Duke of Wellington and is now at Apsley House. He later died in Dorset and is commemorated alongside the Duke of Wellington on the Andle stone on Stanton Moor in Derbyshire.
