= Johannes Franciscus Spohler =

Dutch painter

- Died: December 7, 1923 (aged 70); Amsterdam
- Occupation: Painter

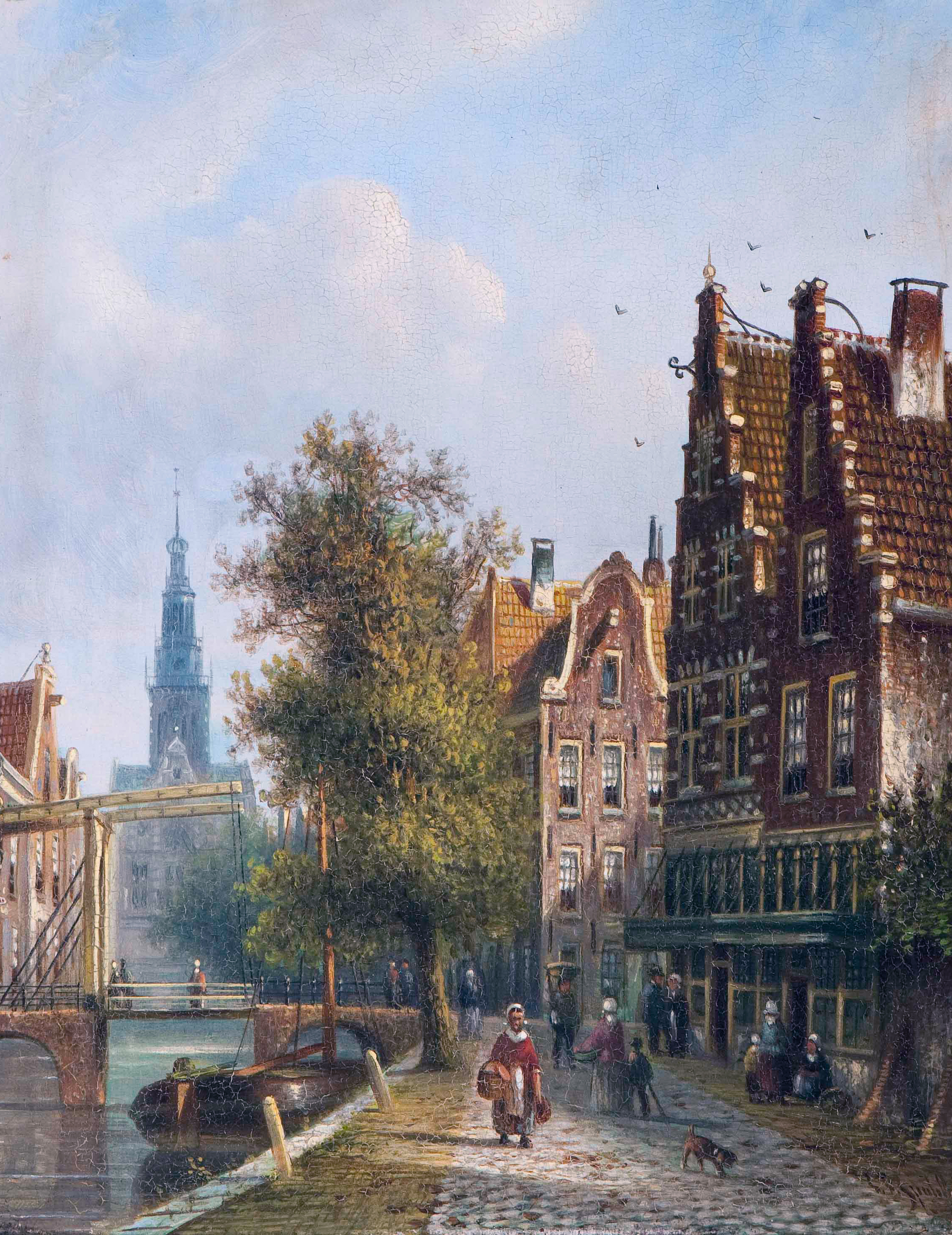
View of Alkmaar

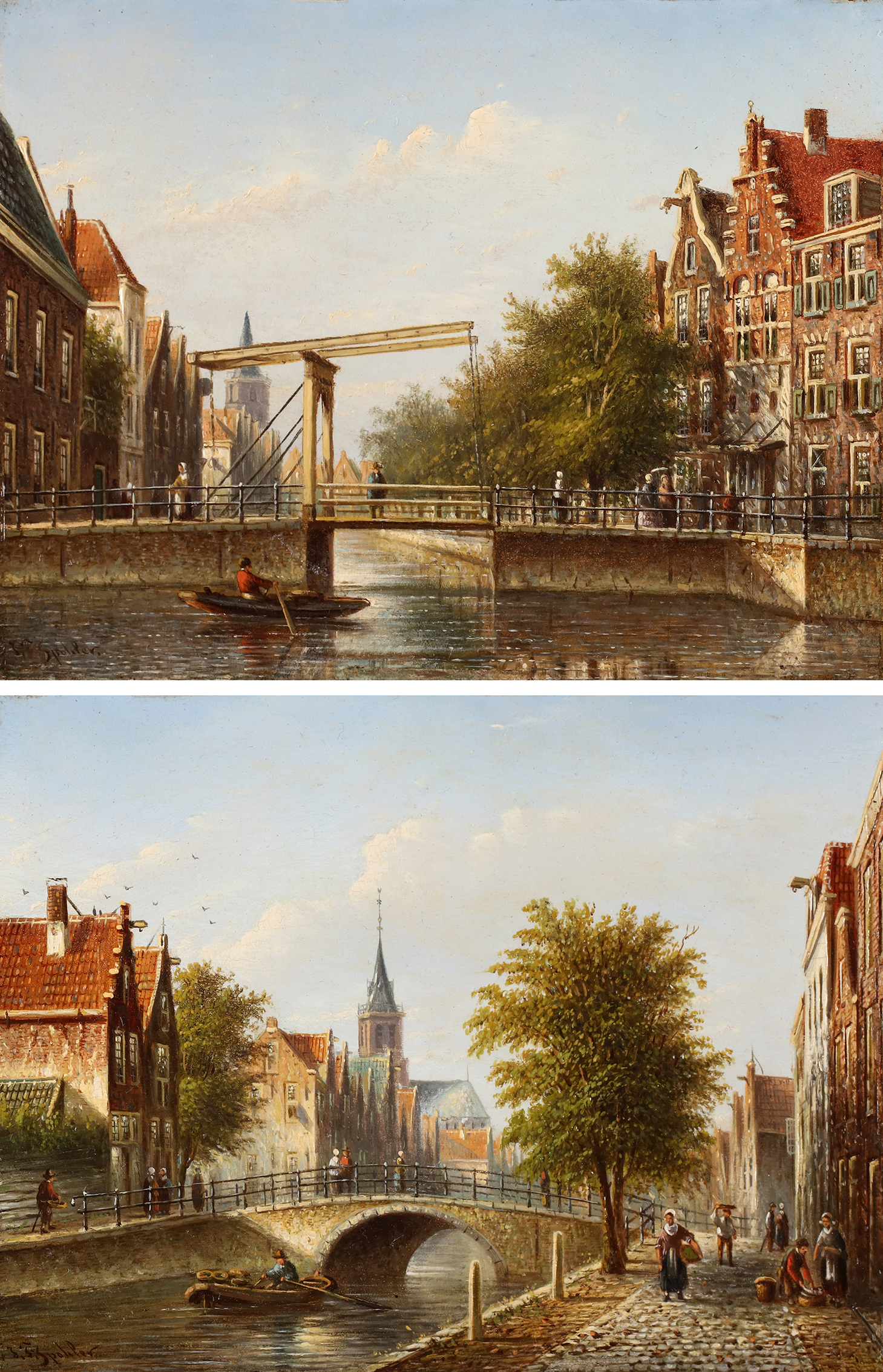
Two city views from Amsterdam (French collection)

Johannes Franciscus Spohler (1853 in Rotterdam – 1923), was a Dutch painter.

== Biography ==
He was the son and pupil of Jan Jacob Spohler. He is known for landscapes and cityscapes and was the brother of Jacob Jan Coenraad Spohler. He died in Amsterdam 7 December 1923, and not in 1894 as some sources state.
