= Jan Jacob Spöhler =

Dutch painter

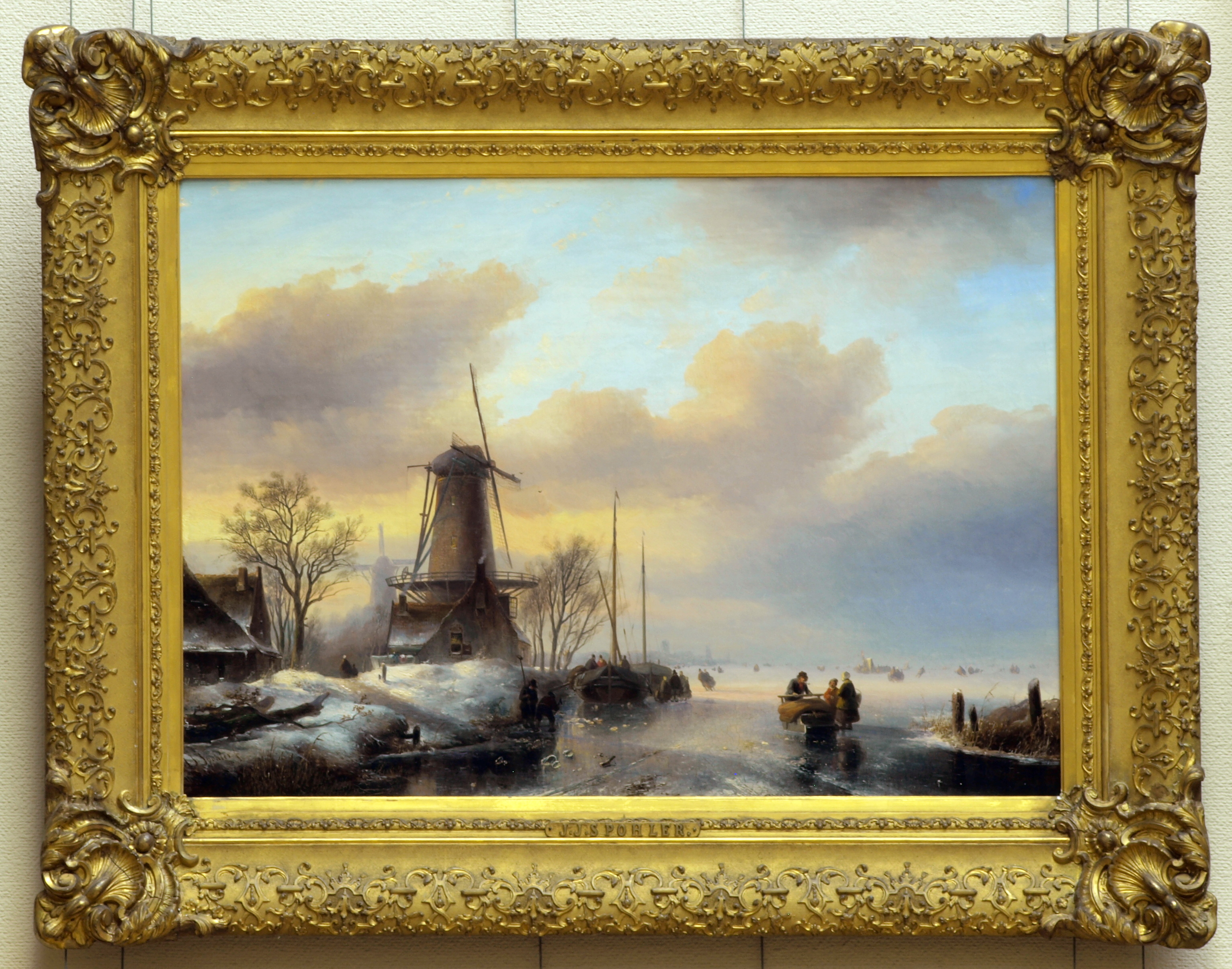
Winter landscape, collection Teylers Museum

Jan Jacob Spöhler (November 7, 1811 in Nederhorst den Berg –June 5, 1866 in Amsterdam), was a 19th-century painter from the Northern Netherlands.

== Biography ==
According to the RKD he was a pupil of Jan Willem Pieneman and became a member of the Koninklijke Academie in Amsterdam in 1845. He is known for winter landscapes and became the father of the painters Jacob Jan Coenraad Spohler and Johannes Franciscus Spohler. He worked in Amsterdam from 1830 to 1839 (where he later returned and lived from 1861 onwards), Haarlem 1840–1843, Brussels 1844-1847 (and briefly again in 1853), The Hague 1848–1849, Leiden 1850–1860, and Rotterdam 1854–1855. In addition to his sons he taught the painter Willem Vester.
