= Gerardus Craeyvanger =

Dutch violin player and baritone

Gerardus Craeyvanger or Gerardus Kraijvanger (Utrecht, January 13, 1775- Utrecht, March 10, 1855) was a Dutch violin player and baritone. He also worked as a chorus director and singing teacher.

His parents were Gijsbertus Craeyvanger and Geertruida Klingen. His sister, Gertrudis Craeyvange, was a writer. He married Johanna Swillens and later Margaretha Swillens. He is the father of the painters Gijsbertus Craeyvanger and Reinier Craeyvanger, and of the violinist Carolus Arnoldus Craeyvanger.
