= Jacob Jan Coenraad Spohler =

Dutch painter (1837–1894)

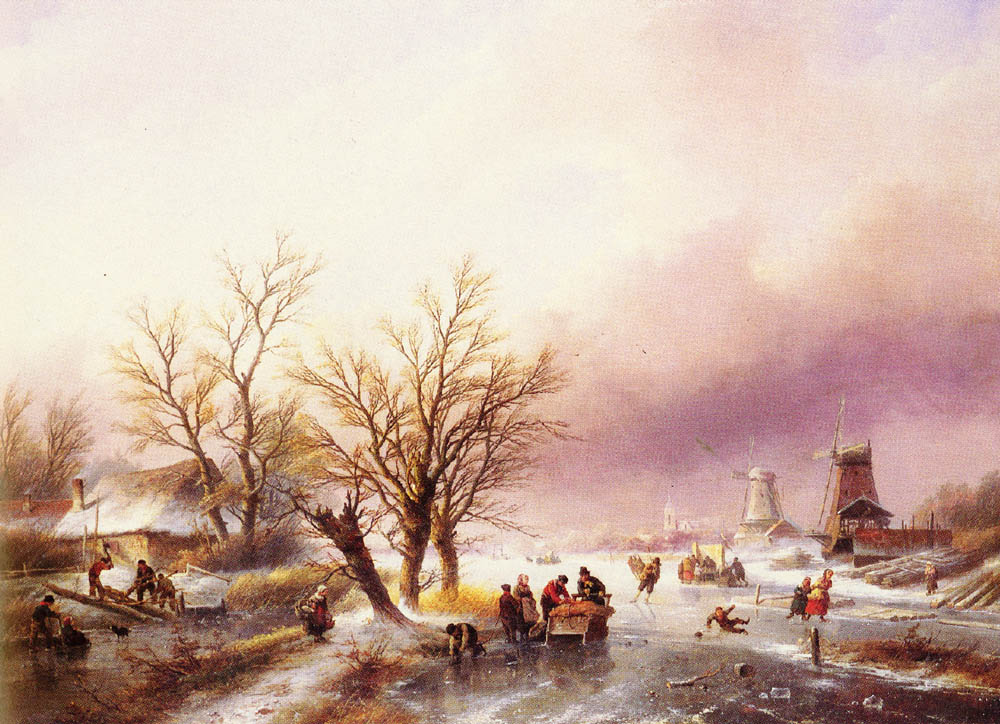
Winter landscape

Jacob Jan Coenraad Spohler (1837–1894) was a Dutch painter.

He was the son and pupil of Jan Jacob Spohler. He is known for his winter landscapes and cityscapes and was the brother of Johannes Franciscus Spohler.
