= The Battle of Waterloo (Pieneman painting) =

Painting by Jan Willem Pieneman

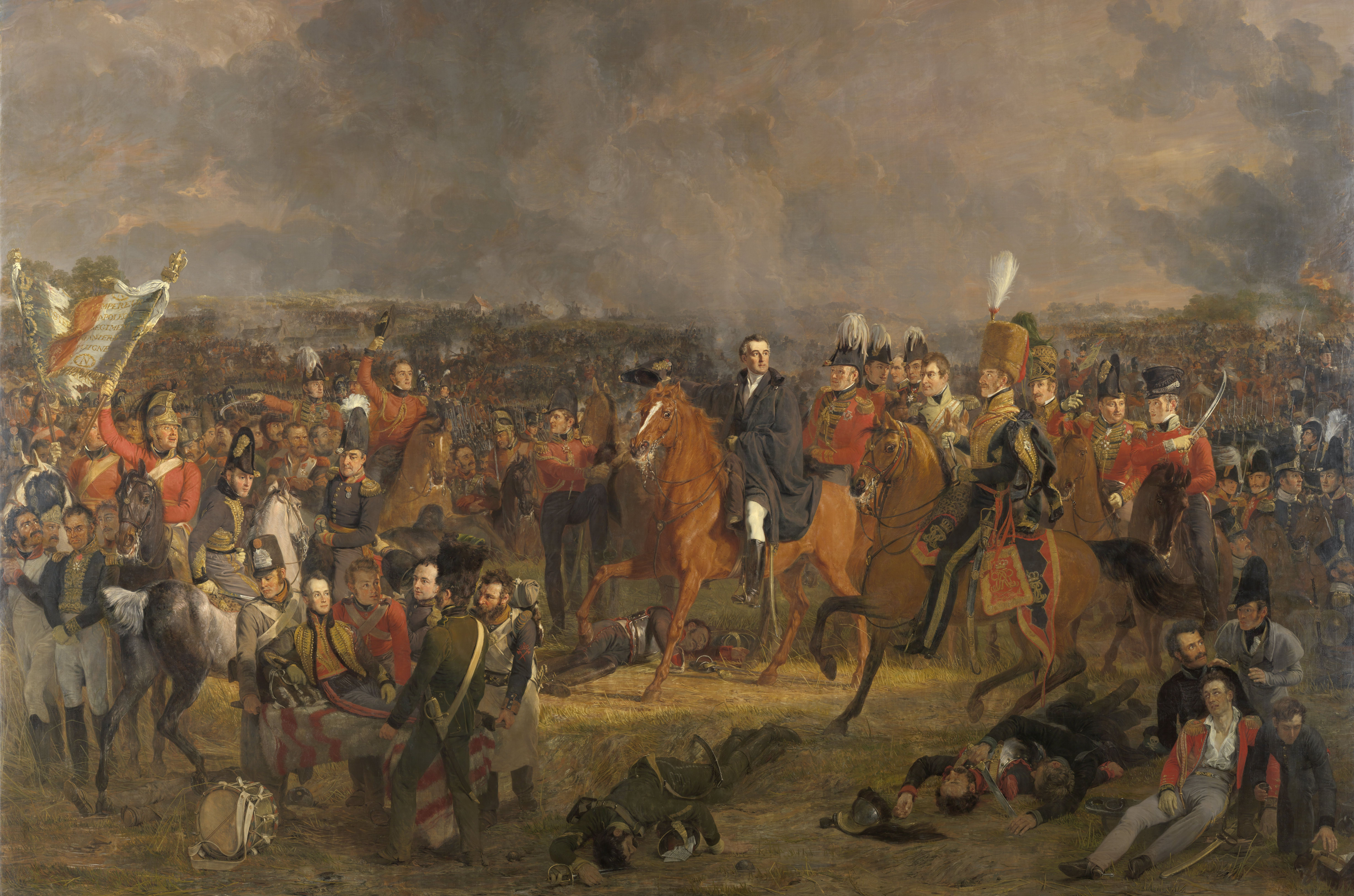
- Artist: Jan Willem Pieneman
- Year: 1824
- Type: Oil on canvas
- Dimensions: 567 cm × 823 cm (223 in × 324 in)
- Location: Rijksmuseum, Amsterdam

The Battle of Waterloo (Dutch: De Slag bij Waterloo) is a large history painting by the Dutch artist Jan Willem Pieneman completed in 1824. It portrays the Battle of Waterloo on 18 June 1815 which marked the final defeat of Napoleon's French Empire and the end of the Napoleonic Wars. It focuses on the Allied commanders led by the Duke of Wellington. Following the success of his 1818 work The Prince of Orange at Quatre Bras the artist chose to depict another scene from the Hundred Days campaign. He traveled to London in February 1821 where he received assistance from the Duke of Wellingon who let him establish a temporary studio in Apsley House and posed for his own portrait. He also arranged sittings with other senior figures present at Waterloo and in addition had his horse Copenhagen brought to London so that Pieneman could capture its likeness. After spending nearly four months in London the artist returned to Amsterdam where he also painted the Prince of Orange in preparation for the work.

The work itself took almost three years to complete. Measuring eighteen and a half by twenty seven feet it was a giant canvas. It depicts the scene at the moment news reaches Wellington that Prussian forces under Blucher are arriving on the battlefield. The focus is on the Allies, particularly the British, the Dutch and Belgians of the Netherlands and the King's German Legion of Hanover. Wellington is the central figure of the scene, mounted on Copenhagen. The Prince of Orange is in the bottom left hand corner of the painting, wounded and being carried on a stretcher. Other figures portrayed include Lord Uxbridge, Rowland Hill and Miguel Ricardo de Álava. Behind them the battle rages on. To the left British cavalrymen of the 2nd (Royal North British) Regiment of Dragoons and 1st (Royal) Regiment of Dragoons wave in the air French Imperial Eagles their regiments captured.

Although Wellington may have planned to acquire the painting to hang at his country estate Stratfield Saye, it was bought instead by the Prince of Orange for 40,000 guilders. The sum was actually paid by his father William I as a gift for his son and heir. As a condition of the sale, Pieneman insisted that he be allowed to exhibit the painting in London. Wellington did manage to acquire thirteen of Pieneman's studies for the work (individual ones of Lord Uxbridge, Hill, da Álava, John Fremantle, William Thornhill, Colin Halkett, FitzRoy Somerset, James Shaw, John Elley, John Colborne, Lord Edward Somerset and George Cooke, and a dual study of Frederick Ponsonby and Colin Campbell), all now at Apsley House.

Due to the painting's large size it was decided to construct a specially-built pavilion in Hyde Park. This opened in early May 1825 proved very popular with the British public who turned out in large numbers. The work was on display for around ten months in total including the tenth anniversary of the battle on 18 June 1825. It was also exhibited in Brussels and Ghent. It is now in the Rijksmuseum in Amsterdam, the largest work in the collection. Smaller versions exist at Apsley House and Cirencester Park in Gloucestershire where a copy was given to Wellington's political ally Lord Bathurst.

== Bibliography ==
- Reynolds, Luke. Who Owned Waterloo?: Battle, Memory, and Myth in British History, 1815–1852. Oxford University Press, 2022.
- Thompson, Neville. Earl Bathurst and British Empire. Pen and Sword, 1999.
- Wellesley, Charles. Wellington Portrayed. Unicorn Press, 2014.
