= The Field of Waterloo (painting) =

Painting by J. M. W. Turner

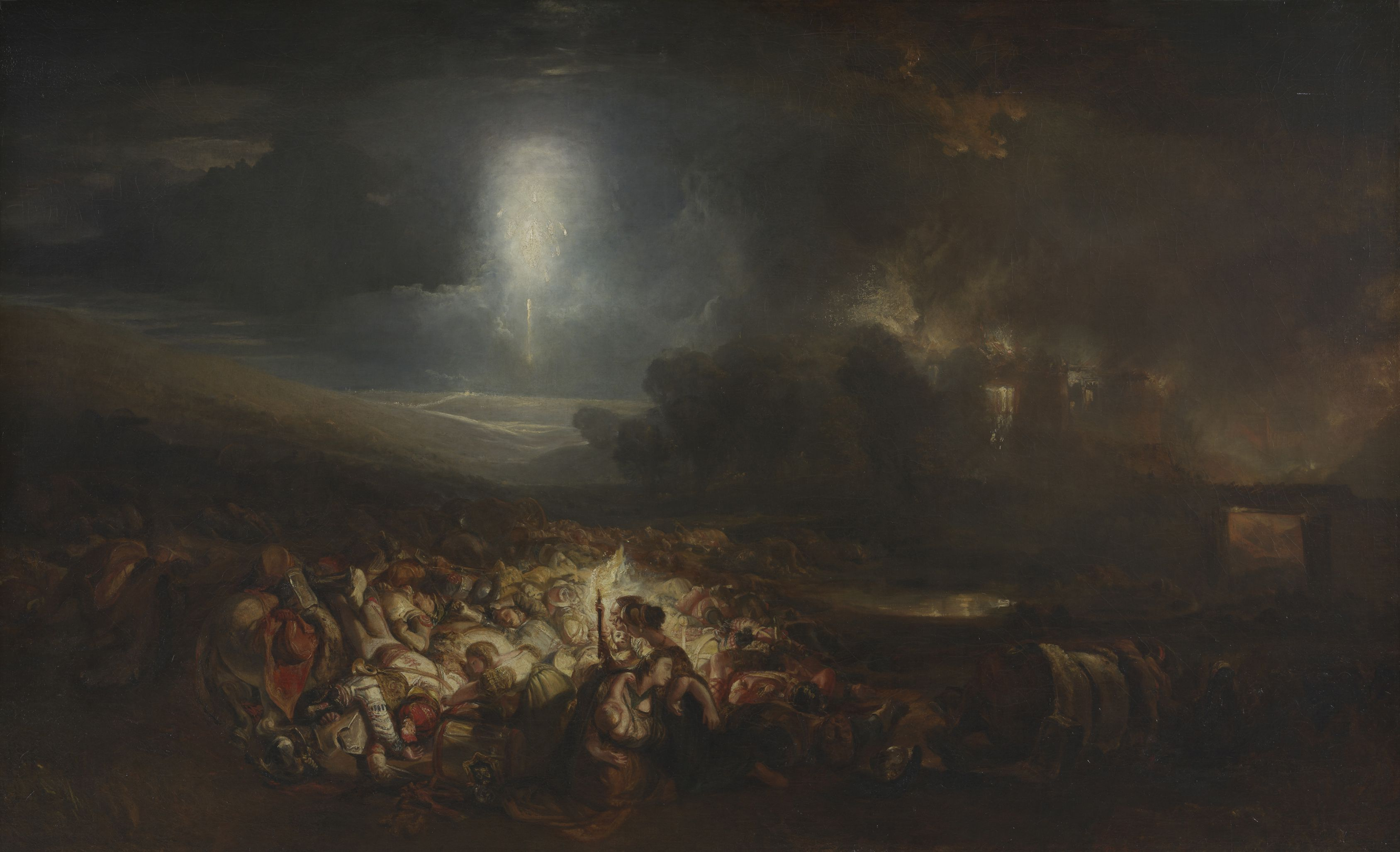
- Artist: J. M. W. Turner
- Year: 1818
- Type: Oil on canvas, History painting
- Dimensions: 147.5 cm × 239 cm (58.1 in × 94 in)
- Location: Tate Britain, London
- Website: www.tate.org.uk/...n00500

The Field of Waterloo is an 1818 history painting by the English artist J. M. W. Turner. It portrays the aftermath of the Battle of Waterloo which took place on 18 June 1815. Rather than the triumphal depictions commonplace in portrayals of the battle, it functions more as an elegy to Waterloo's unknown victims. In 1817 Turner visited the site of the battlefield and drew a number of sketches. In the background is the ruined remains of the farmhouse at Hougoumont which had played a pivotal role in the fighting. It was exhibited at the Royal Academy Summer Exhibition at Somerset House that year along with some lines from Lord Byron's poem Childe Harold's Pilgrimage "friend, foe, in one red burial blent". Part of the 1856 Turner Bequest it is now in the Tate Britain in London.

== See also ==
- List of paintings by J. M. W. Turner

== Bibliography ==
- Finley, Gerald (1999). Angel in the Sun: Turner's Vision of History. McGill-Queen's Press.
- Hamilton, James (1998). Turner - A Life. Sceptre.
