= Reinier Craeyvanger =

Dutch painter and etcher

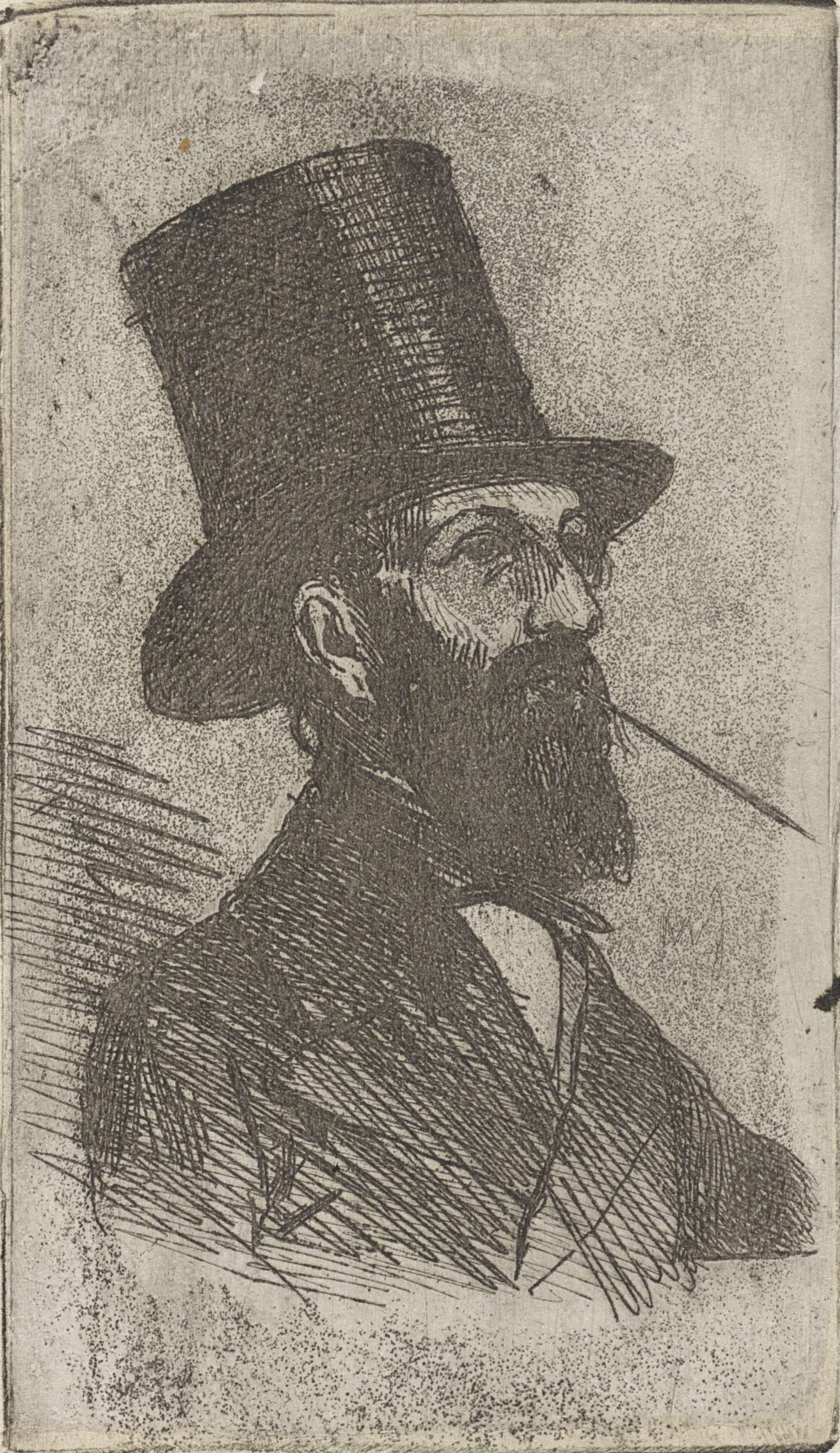
Reinier Craeyvanger by Jan Weissenbruch.

Reinier Craeyvanger (29 February 1812 in Utrecht – 10 January 1880 in Amsterdam), was a 19th-century Dutch painter and etcher who was also a gifted musician.

== Biography ==
He was born in Utrecht as the younger brother of Gijsbertus and the son of Gerardus Craeyvanger and later became the pupil of Jan Willem Pieneman. He etched his own sketches and collaborated with publishers on prints. He is also known for genre works and copies of old masters such as Jan Steen, Gerard Dou, and Frans van Mieris. He was a member of Arti et Amicitiae and served as chairman for five years. In 1848 he was one of the founders of the "Haagse Etsclub", a club for etchers in The Hague, where he lived a few years until 1850. In 1852 he was back in Amsterdam where he later died.

== Selected paintings ==
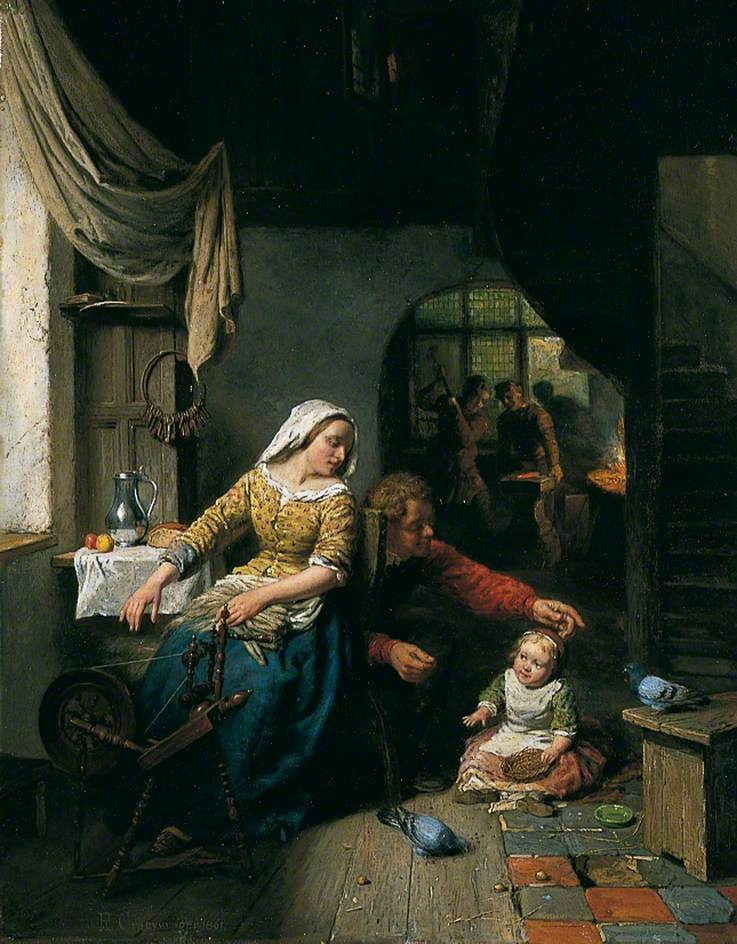
Interior

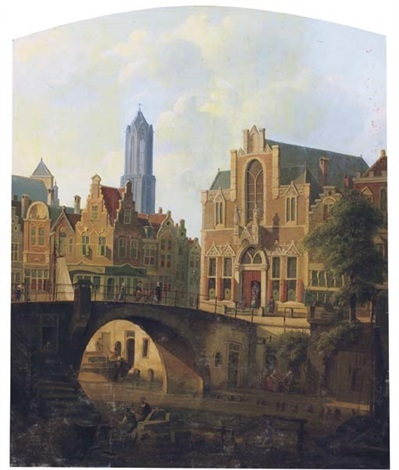
View of Utrecht

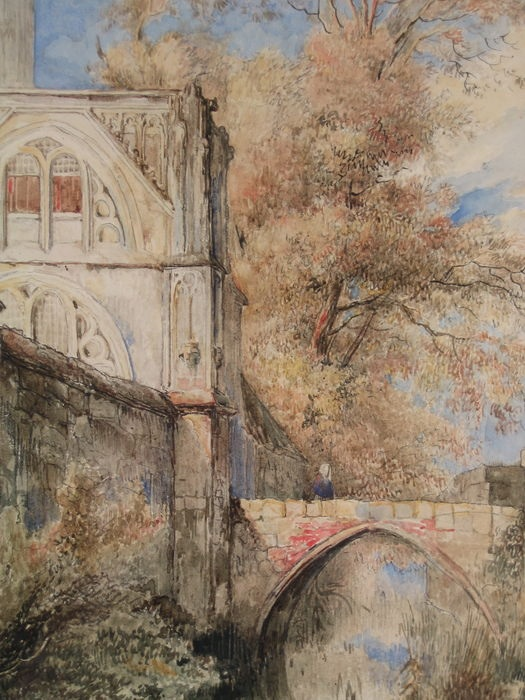
View of a Gothic Church with Bridge

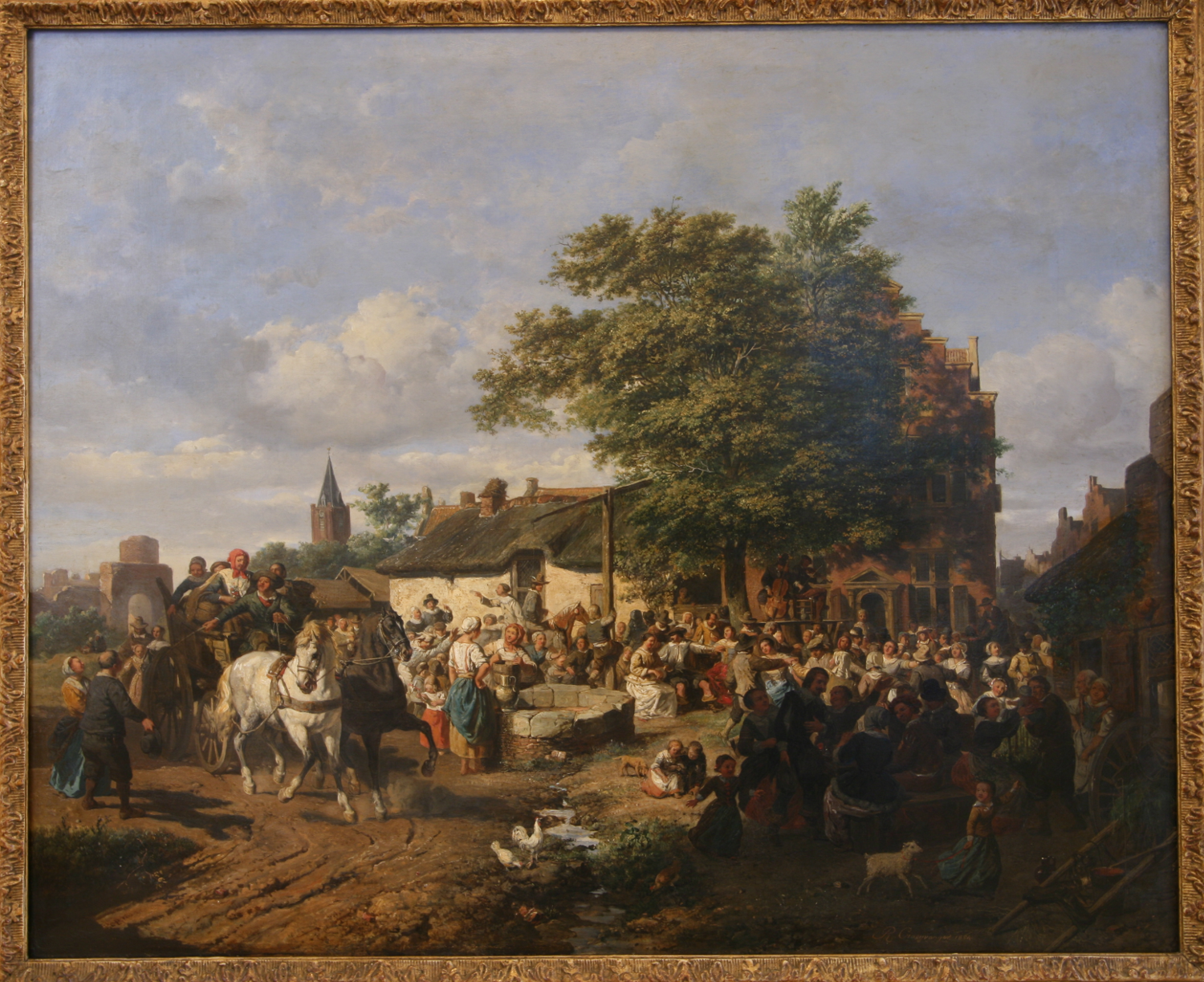
Village Fair
