= Carel Jacobus Behr =

Dutch painter

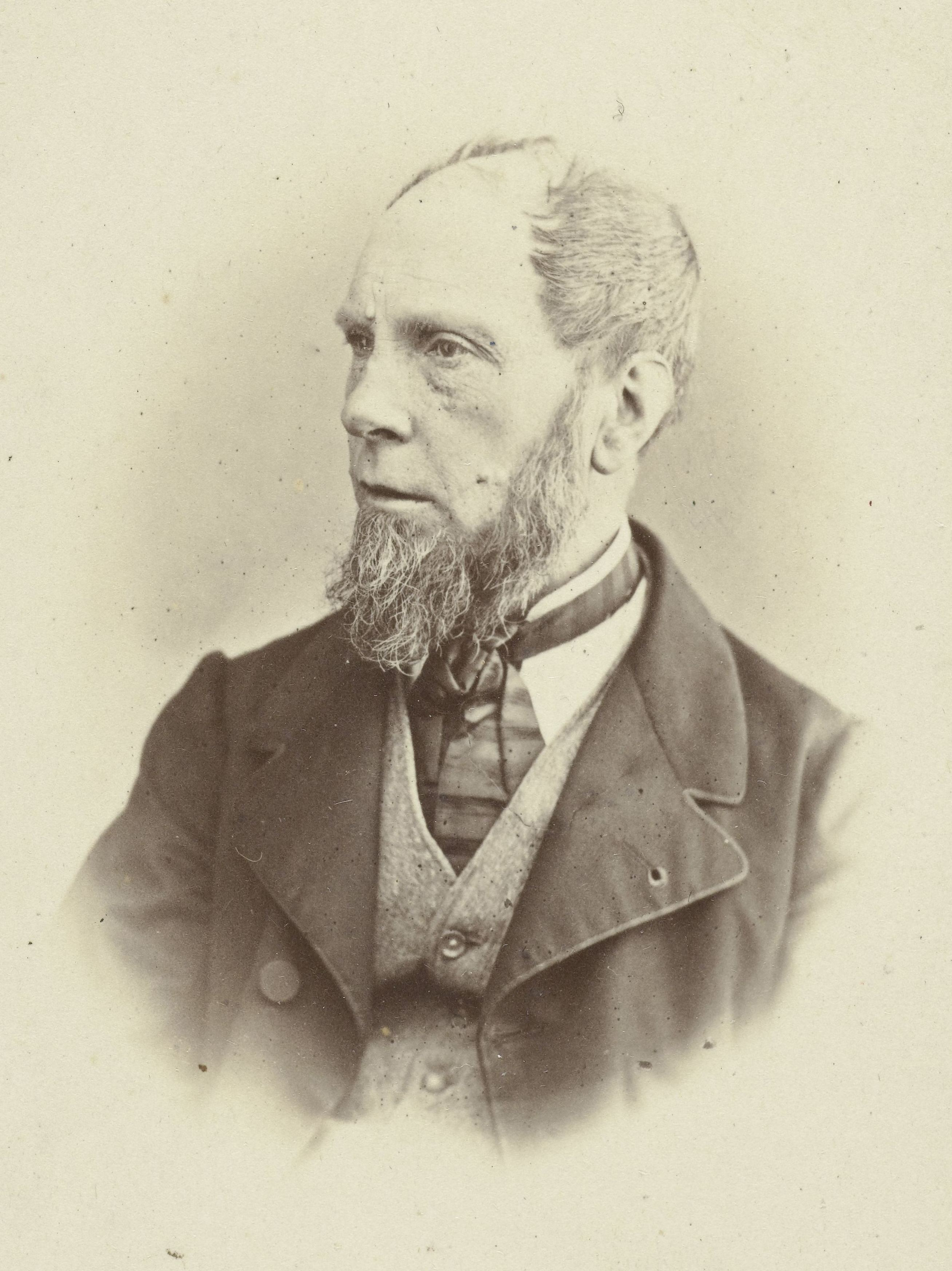
Carel Jacobus Behr

Carel Jacobus Behr (9 July 1812 in The Hague – 11 November 1895) was a Dutch painter, watercolorist and draftsman. He was a pupil of Bartholomeus Johannes van Hove and mainly painted cityscapes, genre scenes and portraits.

In 1836 he produced, commissioned by The Hague municipal government, an image of the town hall there, which carried off the approval of connoisseurs. In 1837 he became a member of the Royal Academy in Amsterdam. His work is found in various collections and different exhibitions, like at the Hague in 1839, Rotterdam in 1840 and again at the Hague in 1841.

== Gallery ==
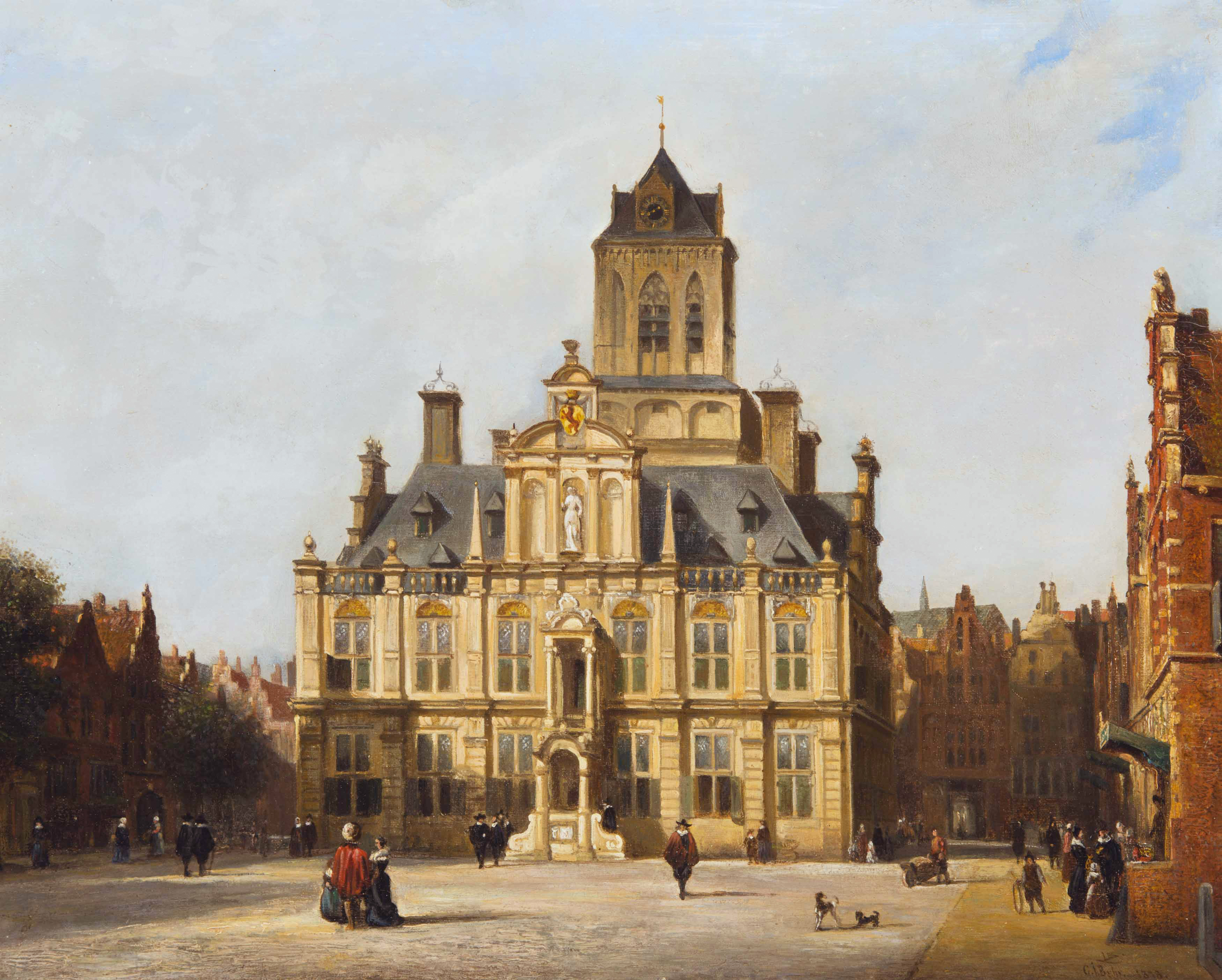
Town hall of Delft, 1878

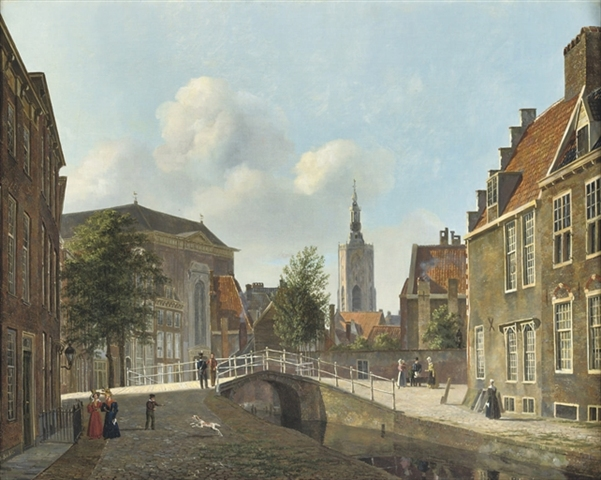
Daily activities along the Paviljoensgracht with the St. Jacobskerk in the distance

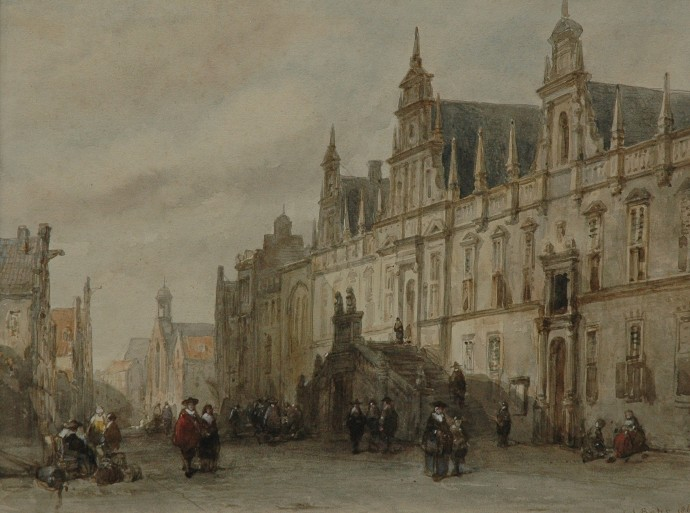
View on Leiden city hall, 1860

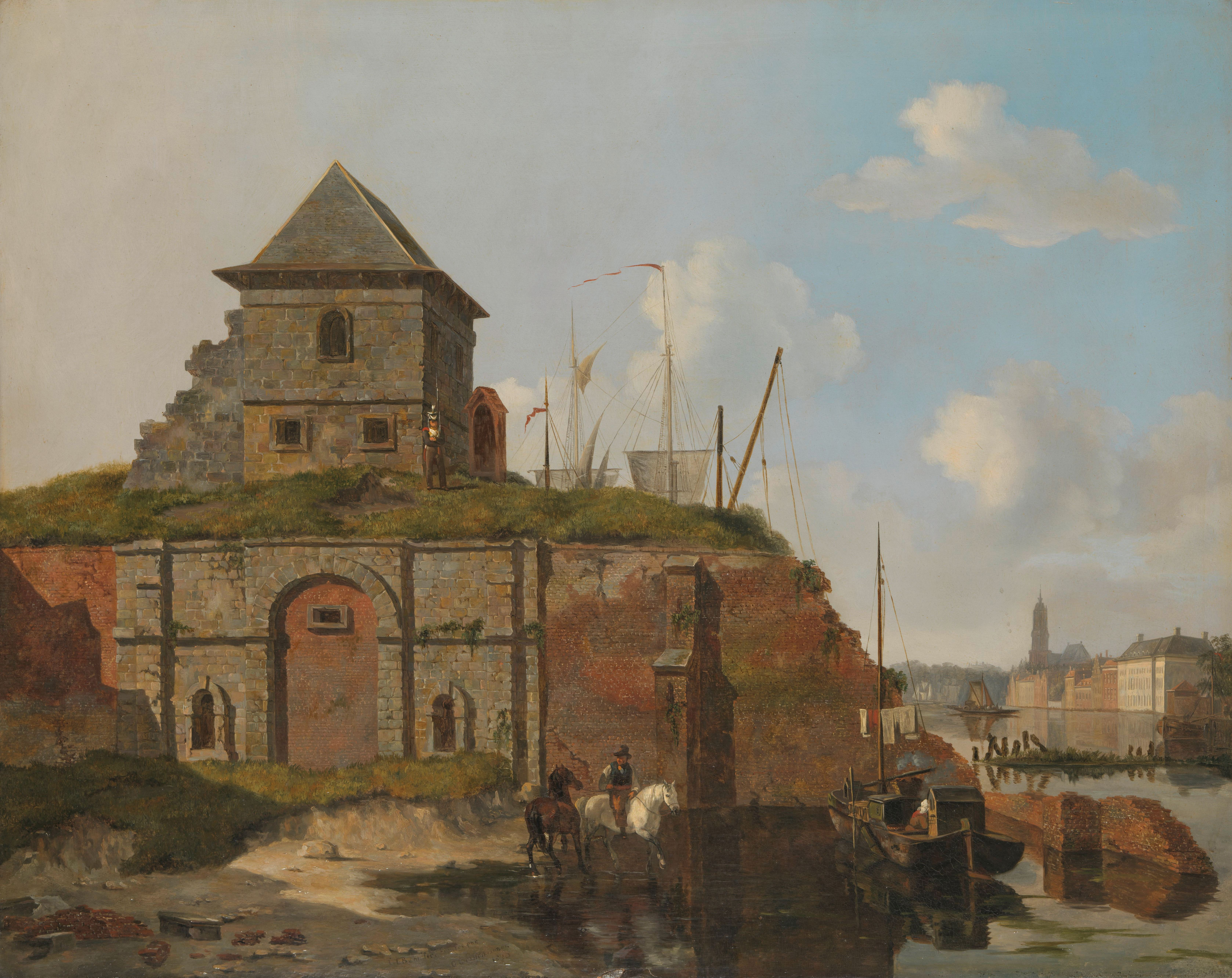
City wall with powder magazine, 1830
