= Jean-Jules Allasseur =

French sculptor

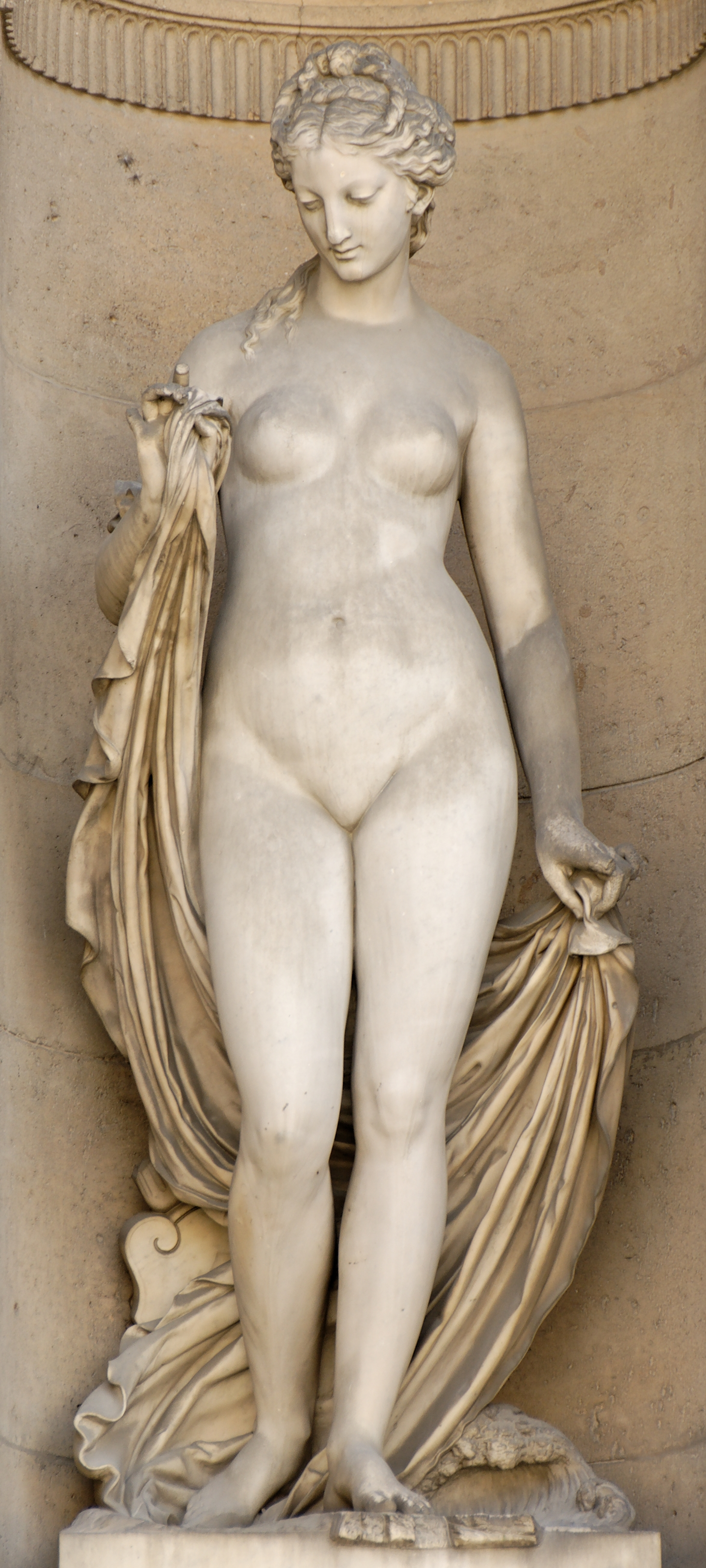
Leucothea (Cour Carrée of the Louvre)

Jean-Jules Allasseur (13 June 1818 — 1903) was a French sculptor, a pupil of Pierre-Jean David called David d'Angers at the École des Beaux-Arts, Paris, who produced portrait sculptures, memorial allegories and decorative architectural sculpture for official commissions under the Second Empire. He was made a chevalier of the Legion of Honor, 7 August 1867.

He is buried at the cemetery of Montmartre (14th division) where he kept his studio.

== Selected works ==
- La Découverte de Moïse, shown in plaster at the Paris Salon of 1853 and in marble, 1859.
- François de Malherbe (1853), one of the eighty-six standing figures of famous Frenchmen in Hector Lefuel's Cour Napoléon of the Louvre Palace.
- Monument of Jean Rotrou (bronze, 1866) for Dreux, adapting and simplifying the features of the famous bust by Caffieri for the foyer of the Comédie-Française.
- Saint Joseph for Saint-Étienne-du-Mont, Paris.
- Saint Carlo Borromeo (1867) for Saint-Étienne-du-Mont.
- Rameau (marble, 1888) for the Académie nationale de musique. Shown at the Paris Salon of 1888.
- Le Pêcheur (Louvre Museum).
- Leucothea (Louvre Museum).
