= Willy Lott's House from the Stour =

Painting by John Constable

- Artist: John Constable
- Year: 1816–18
- Type: Oil on canvas, landscape
- Dimensions: 61 cm × 50.8 cm (24 in × 20.0 in)
- Location: Ashmolean Museum; Oxford

Willy Lott's House from the Stour is a c.1818 landscape painting by the British artist John Constable. It depicts a view on the River Stour in Suffolk, close to the border with Essex, an area where the artist grew up and is now frequently known as Constable Country. It is also known by the alternative title The Valley Farm.

Willy Lott was a tenant farmer who lived at Willy Lott's Cottage and the property appears in a number of Constable paintings, notably The Hay Wain (1821).

In 2014 the painting was allocated to the Ashmolean Museum in Oxford following its acceptance in lieu.

== See also ==
- List of paintings by John Constable

== Bibliography ==
- Bailey, Anthony. John Constable: A Kingdom of his Own. Random House, 2012.
- Maudlin, Daniel, The Idea of the Cottage in English Architecture, 1760 - 1860. Routledge, 2015.
