= Gijsbertus Craeyvanger =

Dutch painter

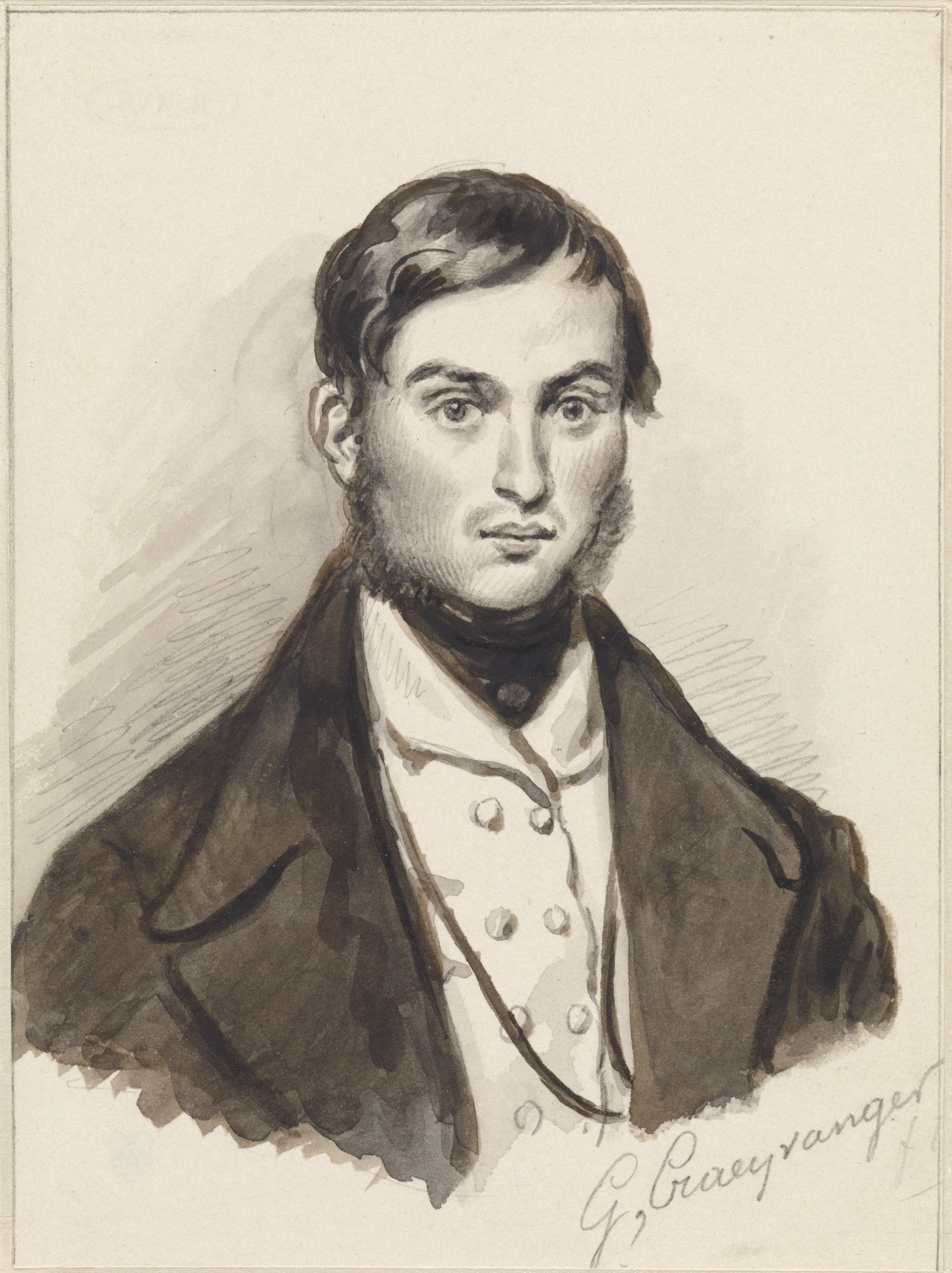
- Born: 21 October 1810; Utrecht, Netherlands
- Died: 17 July 1875 (aged 64); Utrecht, Netherlands

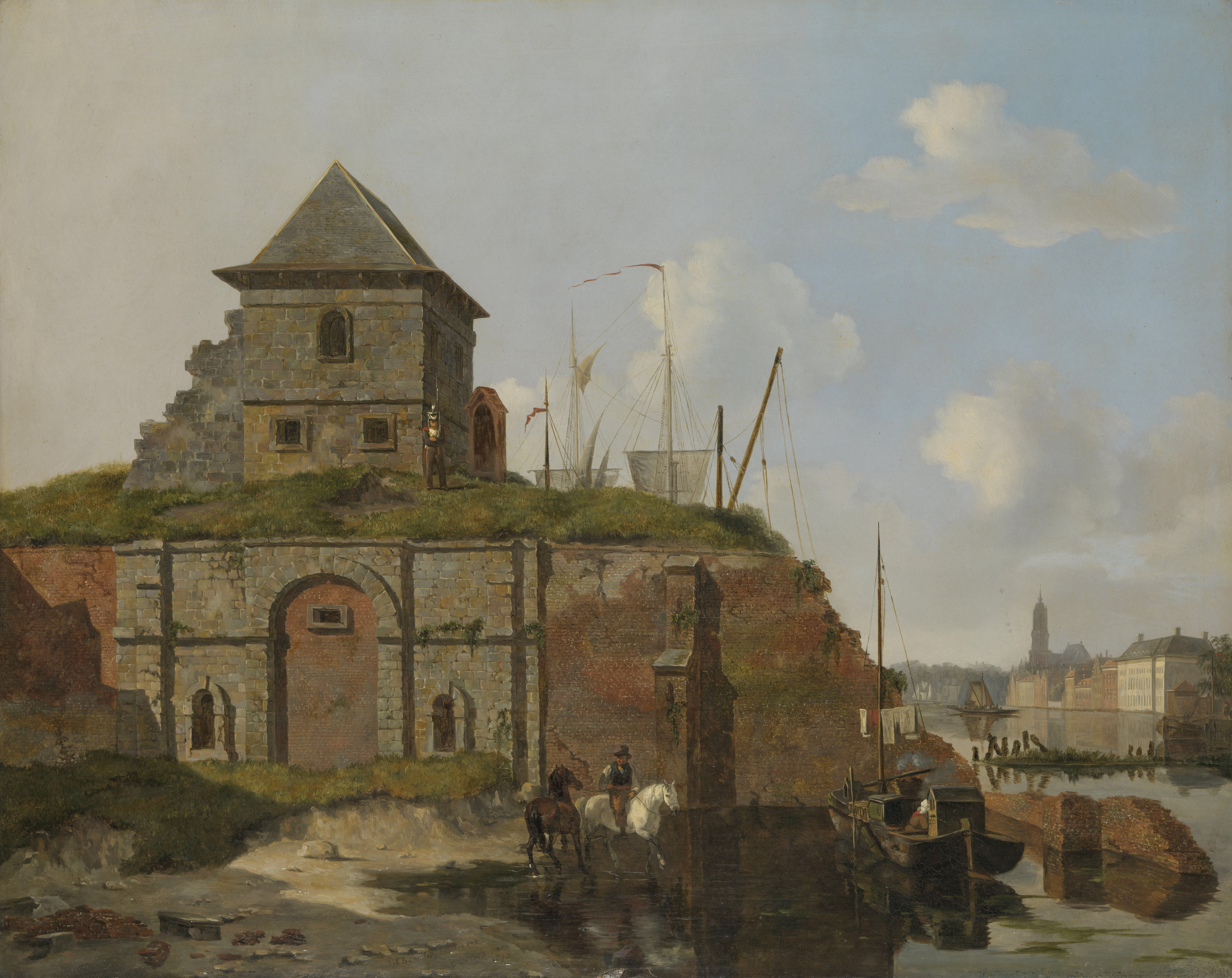
With Carel Jacobus Behr, city wall with gunpowder warehouse.

Gijsbertus Craeyvanger (21 October 1810 – 17 July 1875) was a 19th-century painter from the Dutch Republic.

== Biography ==
He was born in Utrecht, and had one brother, Reinier Craeyvanger. He was a pupil of Jan Willem Pieneman at the Royal Academy of Art, The Hague in Amsterdam, and later became a teacher at a drawing school in Utrecht. His most notable pupil was Albert Neuhuys. Though he is known for landscapes, he also painted figures in the landscapes of Carel Jacobus Behr.

Craeyvanger died in Amsterdam.
