= The Prince of Orange at Quatre Bras =

Painting by Jan Willem Pieneman

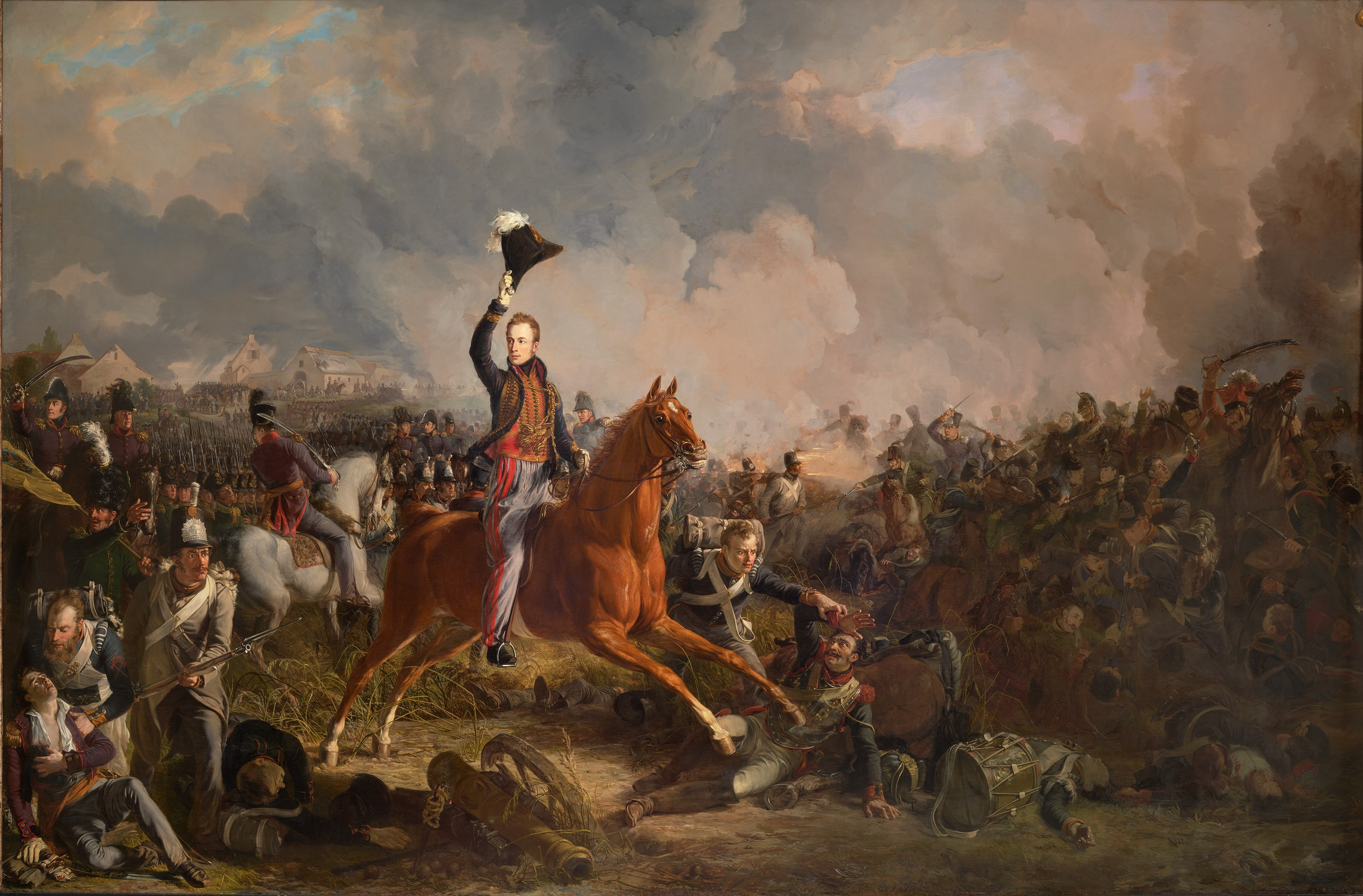
- Artist: Jan Willem Pieneman
- Year: 1818
- Type: Oil on canvas
- Dimensions: 54 cm × 77 cm (21 in × 30 in)
- Location: Rijksmuseum, Amsterdam

The Prince of Orange at Quatre Bras is an 1818 battle painting by the Dutch artist Jan Willem Pieneman. It depicts a scene from the Battle of Quatre Bras fought on 16 June 1815, two days before the decisive Battle of Waterloo. The young William, Prince of Orange, heir to the Dutch throne and a Lieutenant General in the British Army, had command of a corps of Allied troops. The Waterloo campaign took place in Belgium which had recently granted to the new United Kingdom of the Netherlands by the Congress of Vienna. William of Orange was the senior Dutch figure present at the battle, serving under the overall command of the Duke of Wellington.

It began an equestrian portrait of William before being expanded into a grander battle scene. William is shown on horseback encouraging Dutch troops against the French on the right of the canvas.

The success of the painting led to Pieneman being awarded the Golden Lion. He subsequently produced a significantly larger heroic painting of the campaign with his The Battle of Waterloo in 1824. Today the work is in the Rijksmuseum in Amsterdam.

== Bibliography ==
- Reynolds, Luke. Who Owned Waterloo?: Battle, Memory, and Myth in British History, 1815–1852. Oxford University Press, 2022.
