= Jan Willem Pieneman =

Dutch painter (1779–1853)

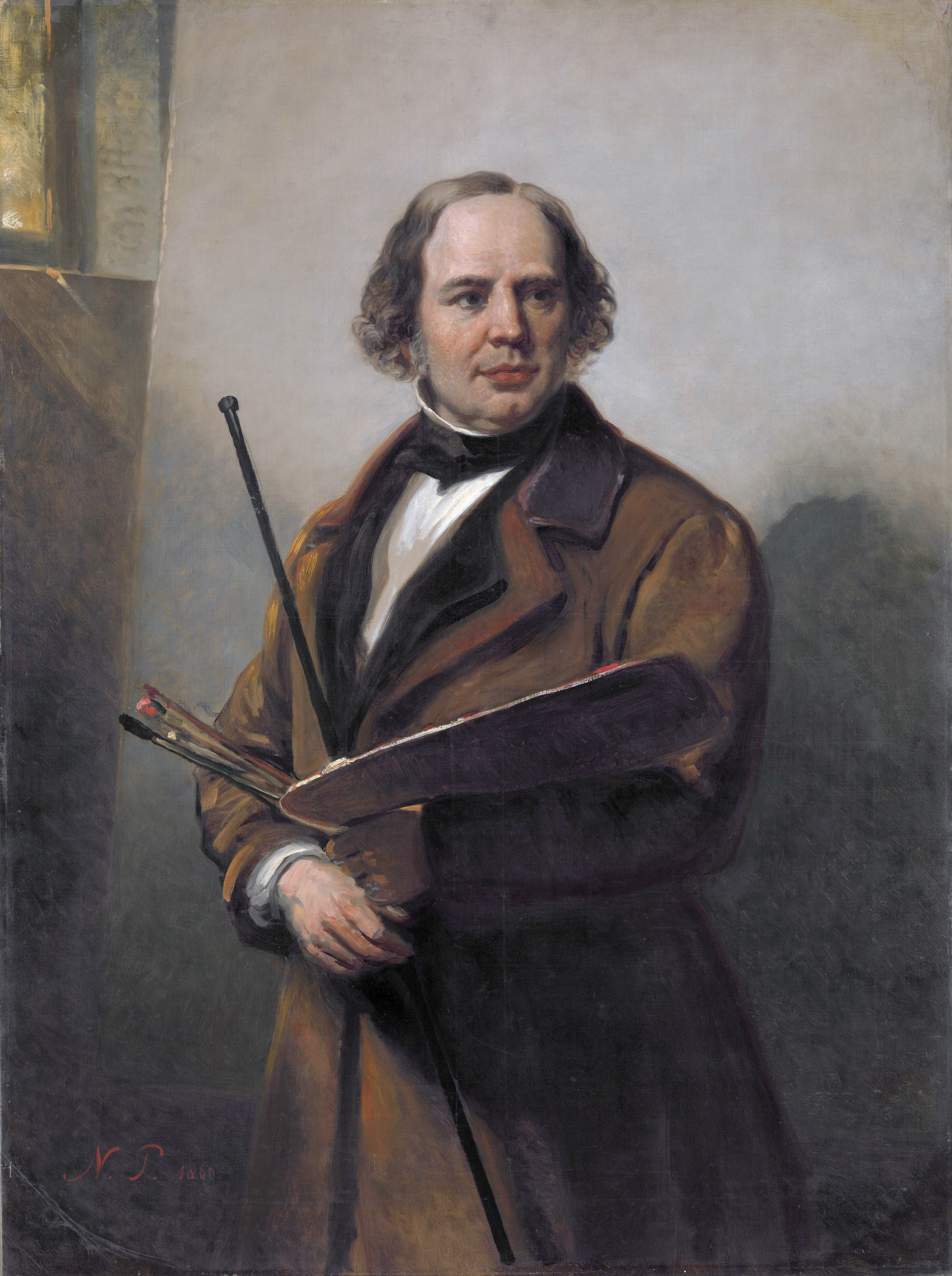
- Portrait of Jan Willem Pieneman (1860) painted by his son Nicolaas Pieneman
- Born: 4 November 1779; Abcoude, Dutch Republic
- Died: 8 April 1853 (aged 73); Amsterdam, Netherlands
- Known for: Painting

Jan Willem Pieneman (Dutch pronunciation: [jɑɱ ˈʋɪləm ˈpinəˌmɑn]; 4 November 1779 – 8 April 1853) was a Dutch painter.

== Biography ==
Jan Willem Pieneman was born on 4 November 1779 in Abcoude in the Dutch Republic (present-day Netherlands).

Initially, he worked as a salesman, but also took courses at the Amsterdam Stadstekenacademie. In 1805 he was appointed as drawing instructor at the artillery and engineering training centre in Amersfoort. He was particularly noted for his paintings depicting events from the history of the United Kingdom of the Netherlands.

His fame was established by a painting he did at the Villa Welgelegen, depicting the heroic acts of the Prince of Orange at the Battle of Quatre Bras, followed by a painting of the Battle of Waterloo. The latter found favor with the Duke of Wellington, who invited him to England, on several occasions, to do portraits.

In 1820 he was appointed as first director of the Royal Academy of Fine Arts (Koninklijke Academie voor Schone Kunsten) in Amsterdam, a position he held until his death. He also served as an assistant director at the "Koninklijk Kabinet" (now the Mauritshuis). From 1844 to 1847 he was director of the Rijksmuseum which at that time was still housed in the Trippenhuis.

He played an important role as mentor and tutor to a group of young artists, one of whom was Jozef Israëls. Other pupils included: Christina Alida Blijdenstein, Jacob Bruggink, Gijsbertus Craeyvanger, Reinier Craeyvanger, Johannes Hinderikus Egenberger, Petrus Franciscus Greive, Lambertus Johannes Hansen, Louis Meijer, his son Nicolaas Pieneman, Jan Jacob Spohler and Willem Steelink.

Pieneman died on 8 April 1853 in Amsterdam.

== Works ==
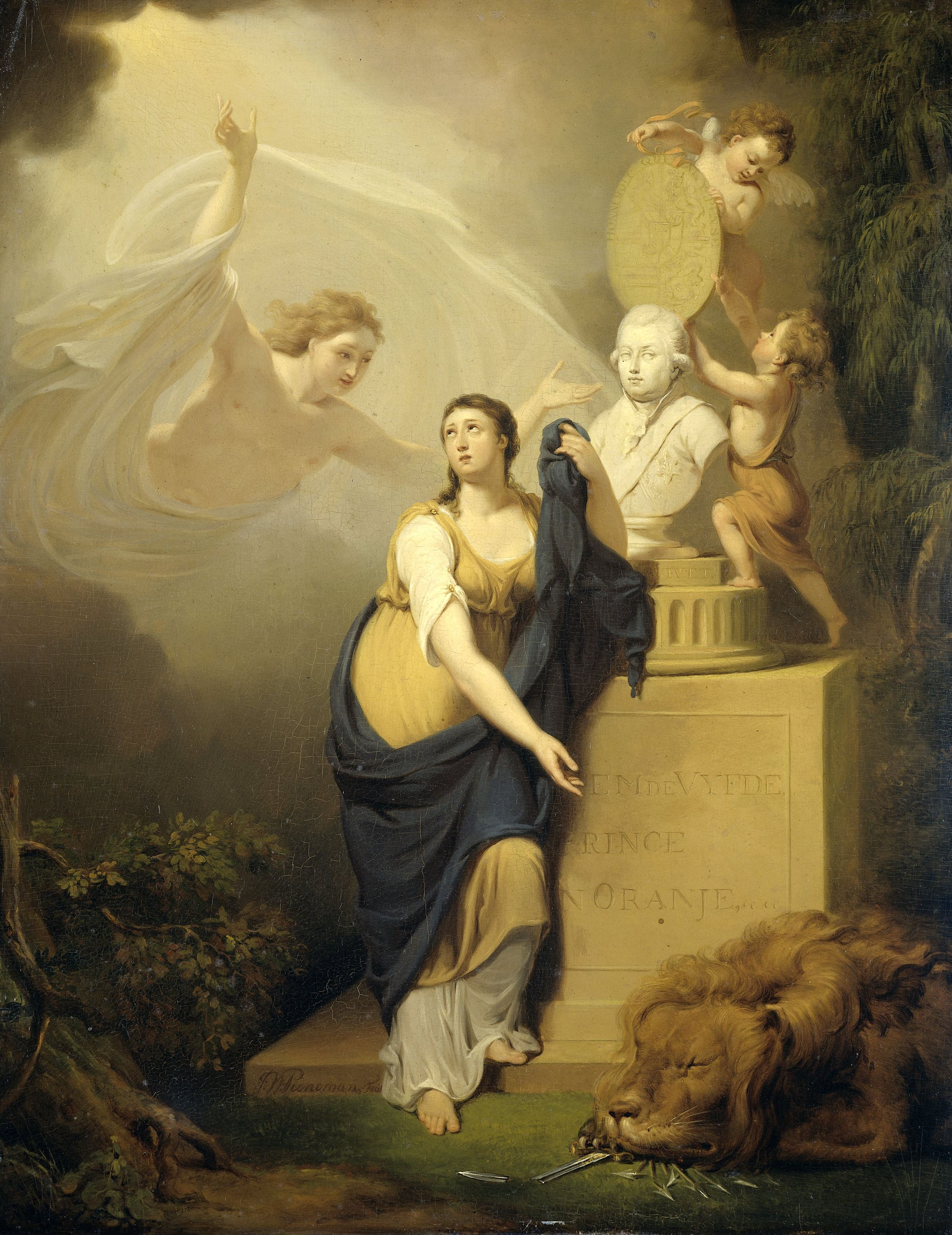
Allegory on the death of William V, Prince of Orange (1806)

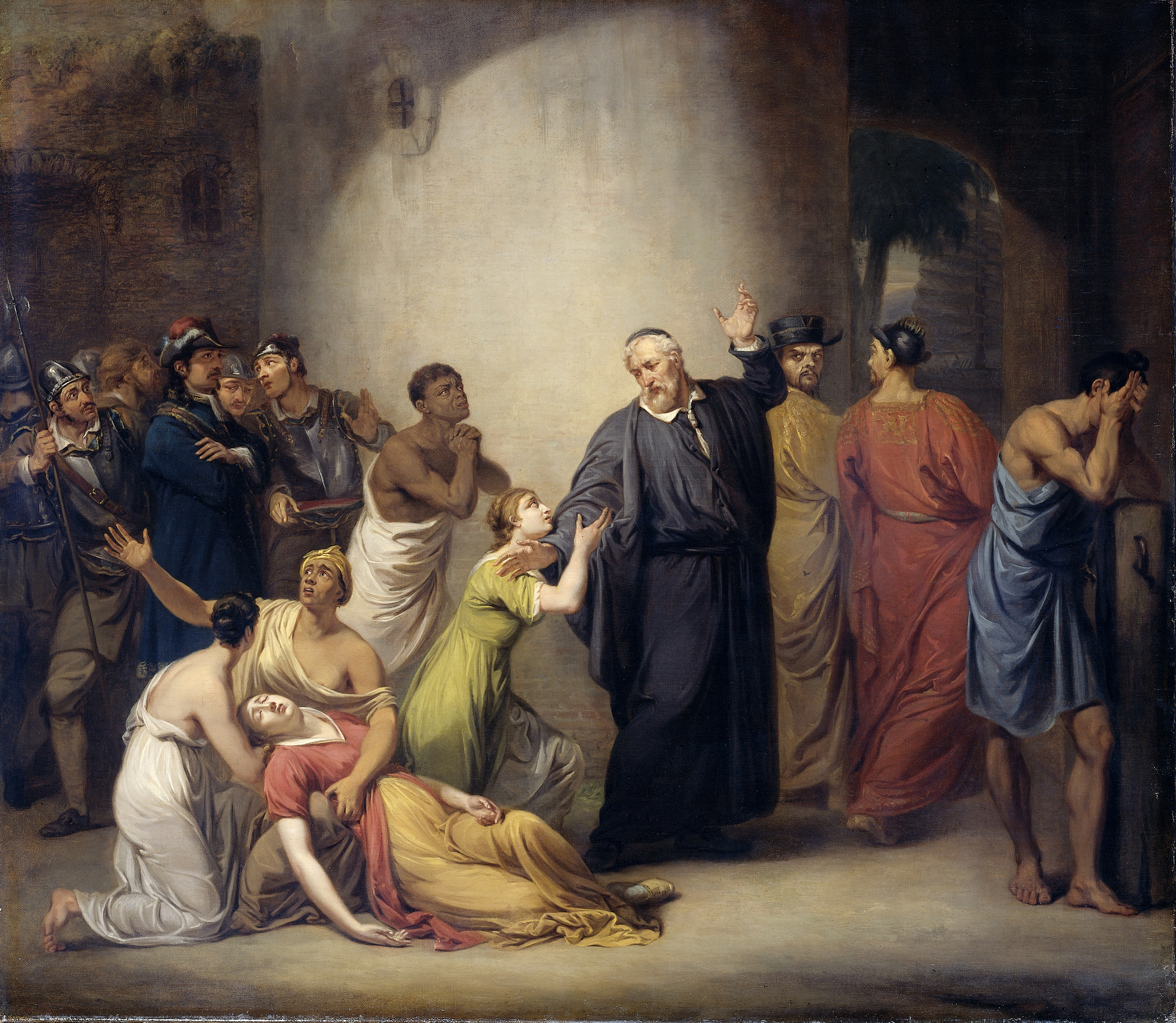
The Self-Sacrifice of Pastor Antonius Hambroek on Formosa (1810)

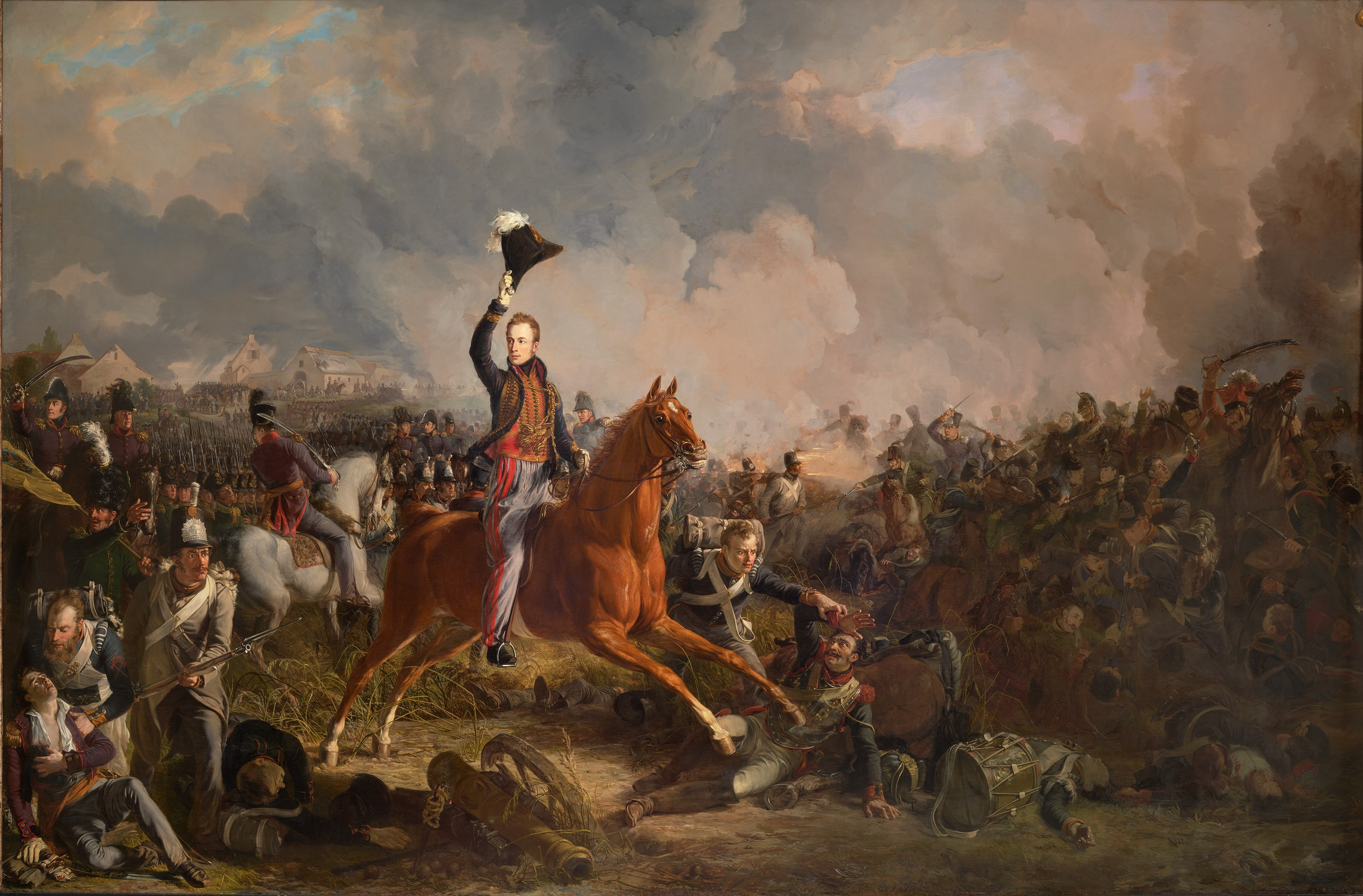
The Prince of Orange at Quatre Bras (1818)

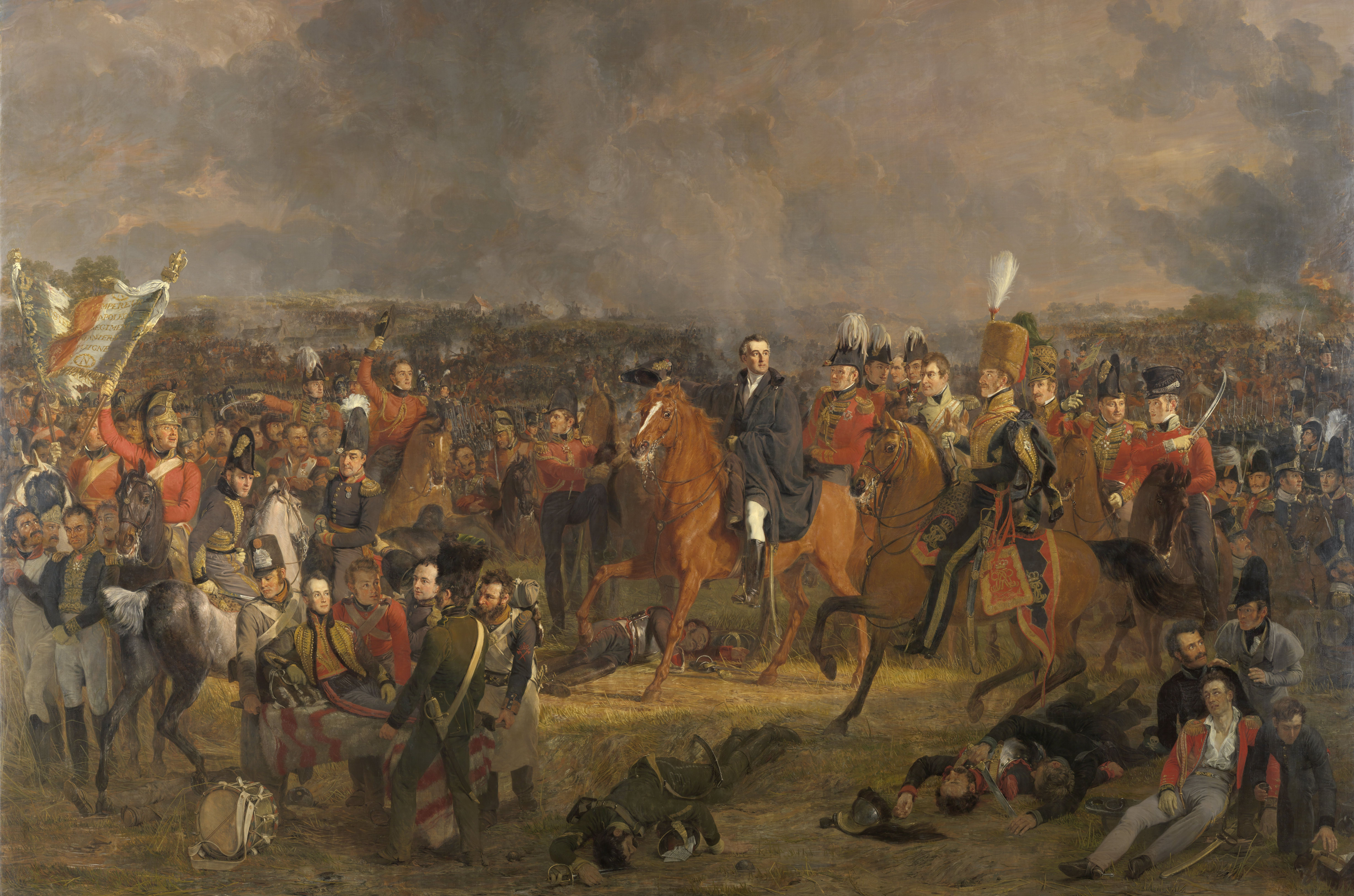
The Battle of Waterloo (Pieneman painting) (detail, 1824), showing, e.g., the Duke of Wellington, King William of Orange and the wounded Prince of Orange

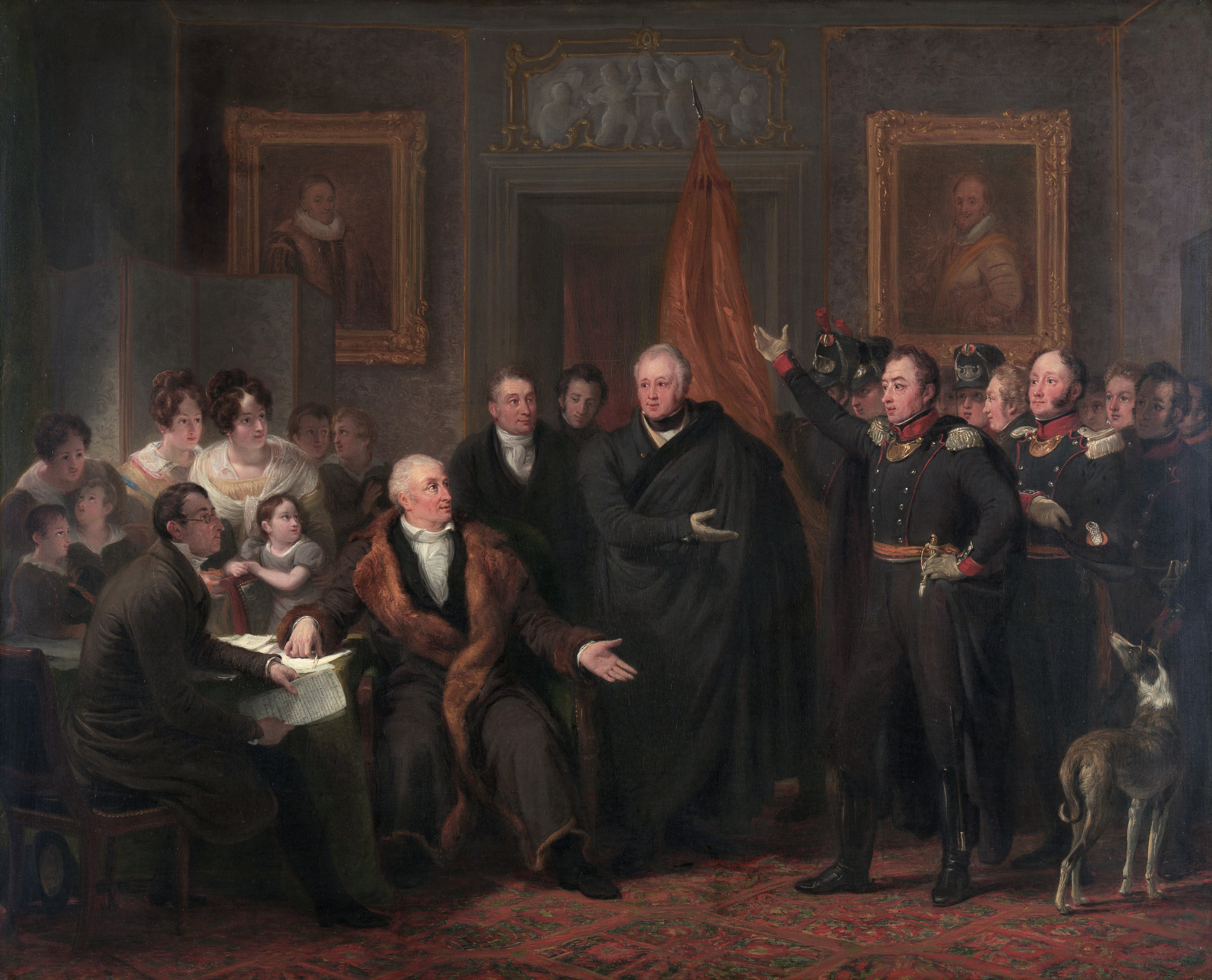
The Triumvirate Assuming Power on Behalf of the Prince of Orange (1828)

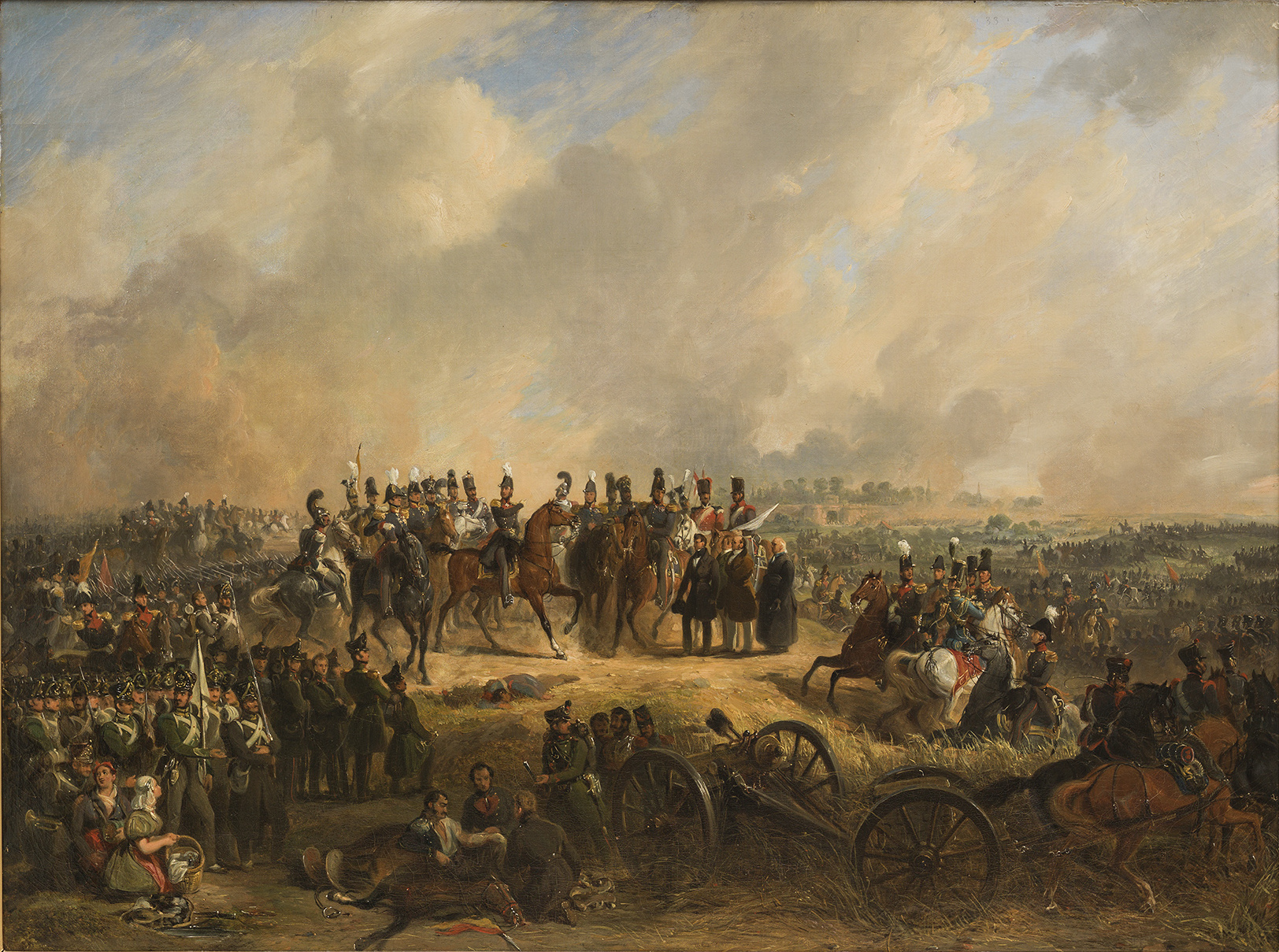
The Surrender of Hasselt (1831)

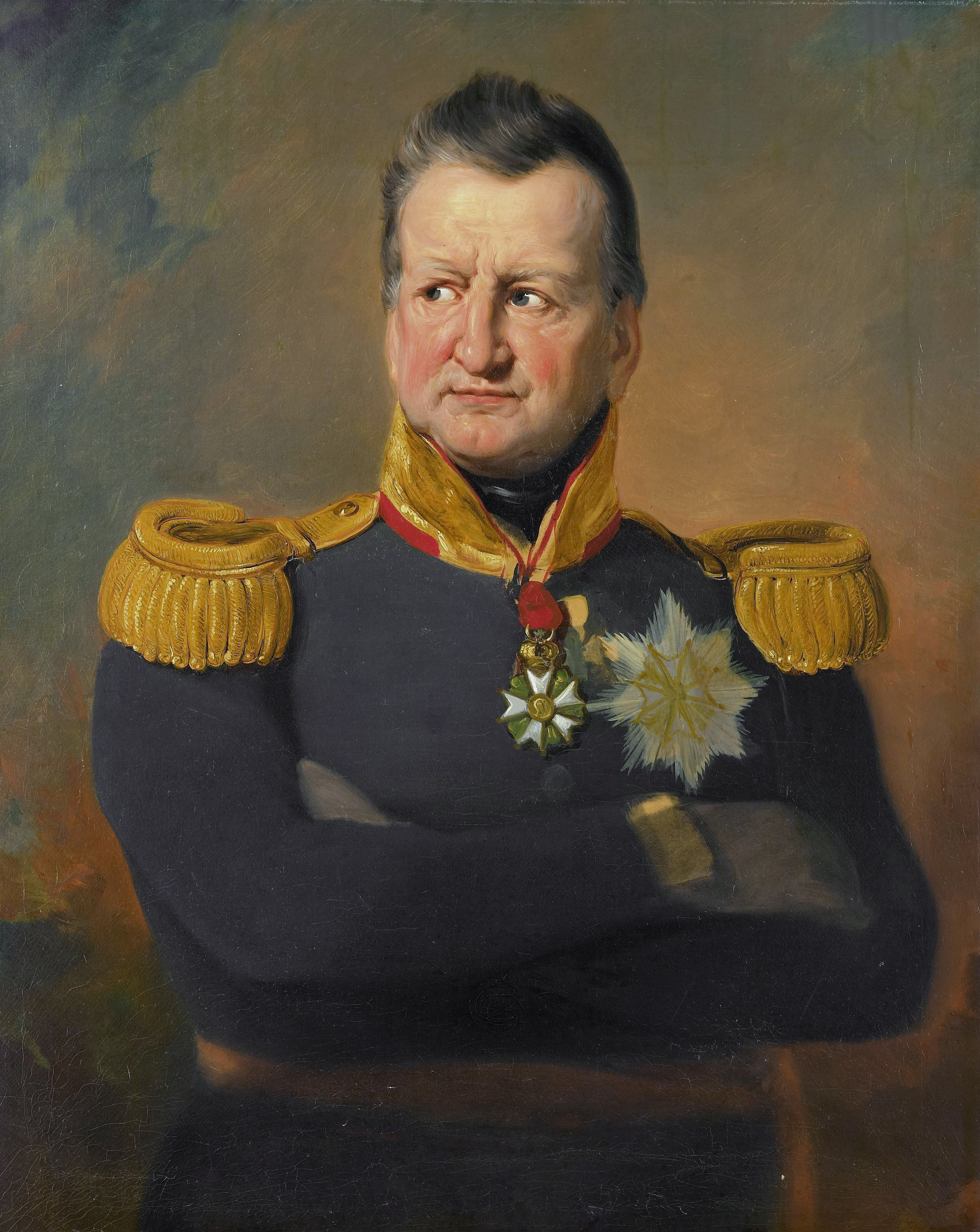
Portrait of General David Hendrik Chassé (1832)

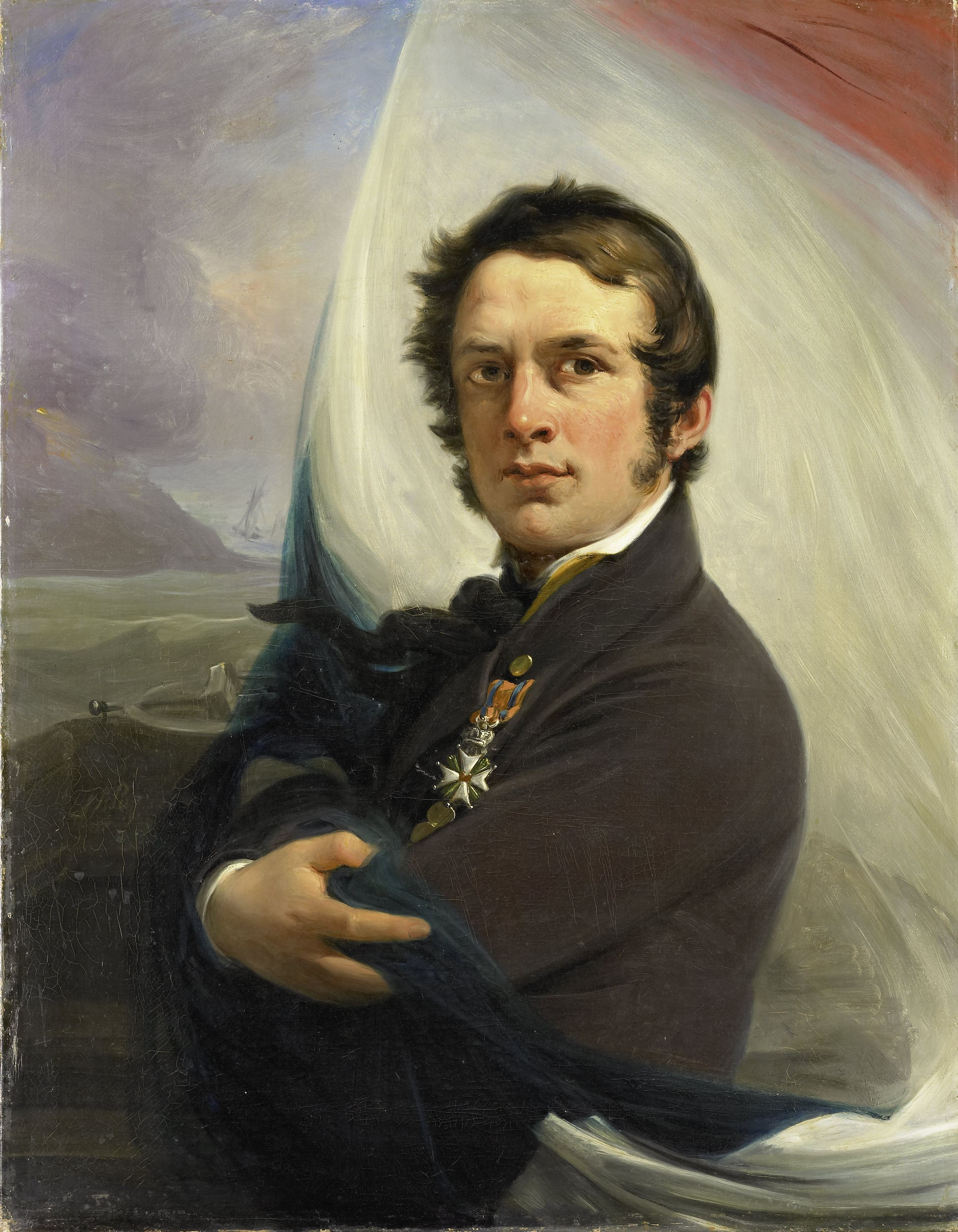
Portrait of Jacob Hobein (1832)

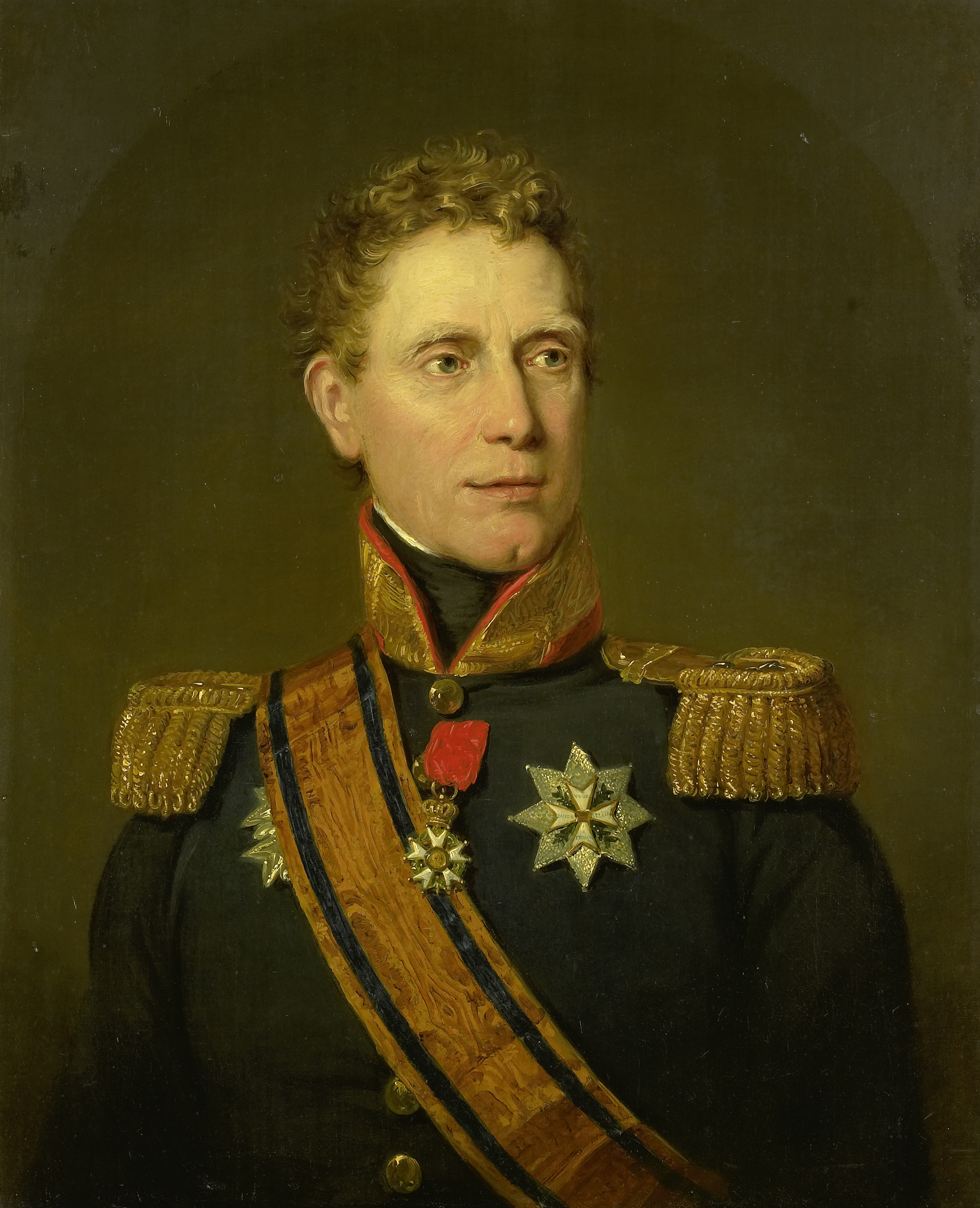
Portrait of Jan Willem Janssens (c. 1815–1838)

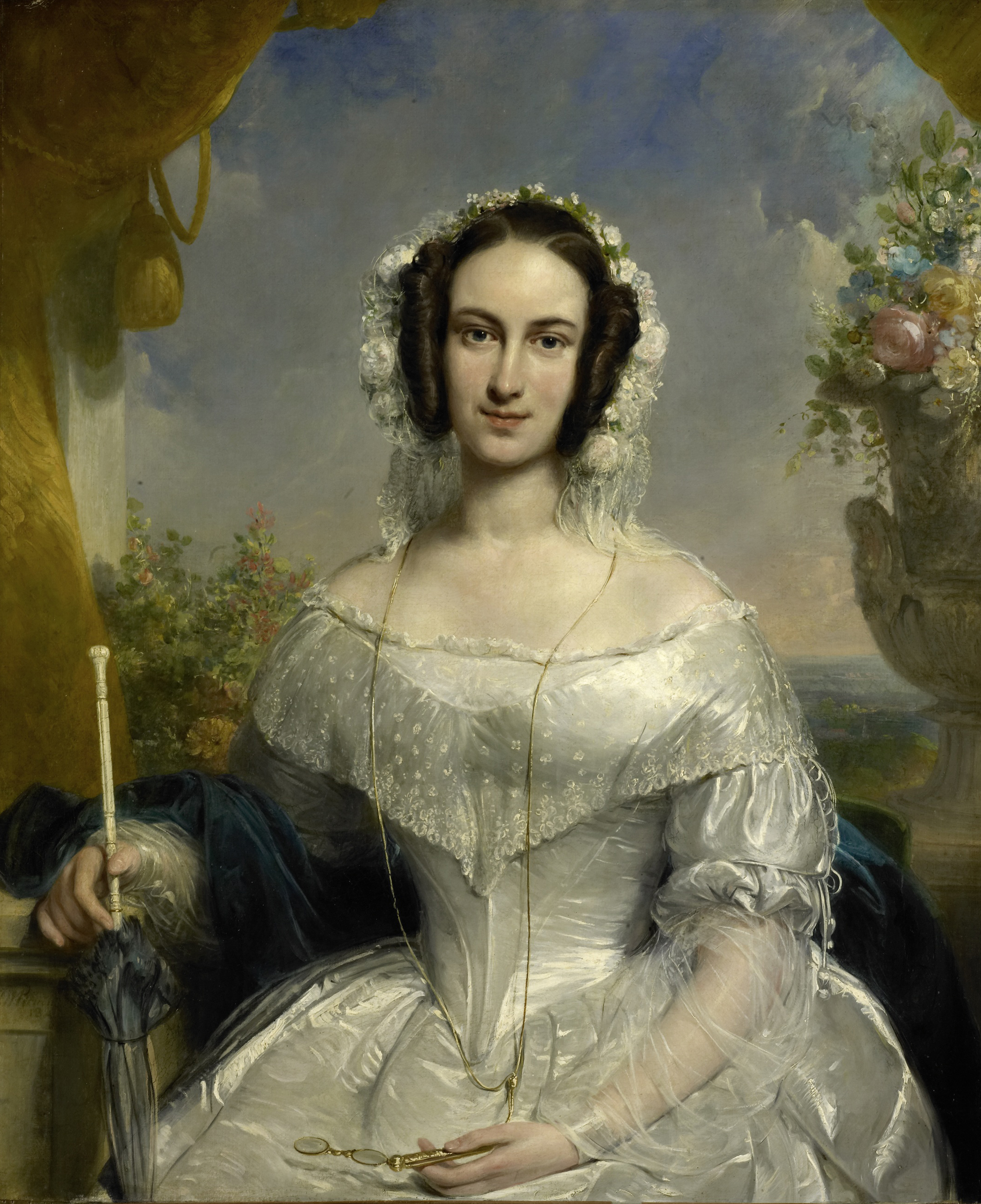
Portrait of Agatha Petronella Hartsen (1841)

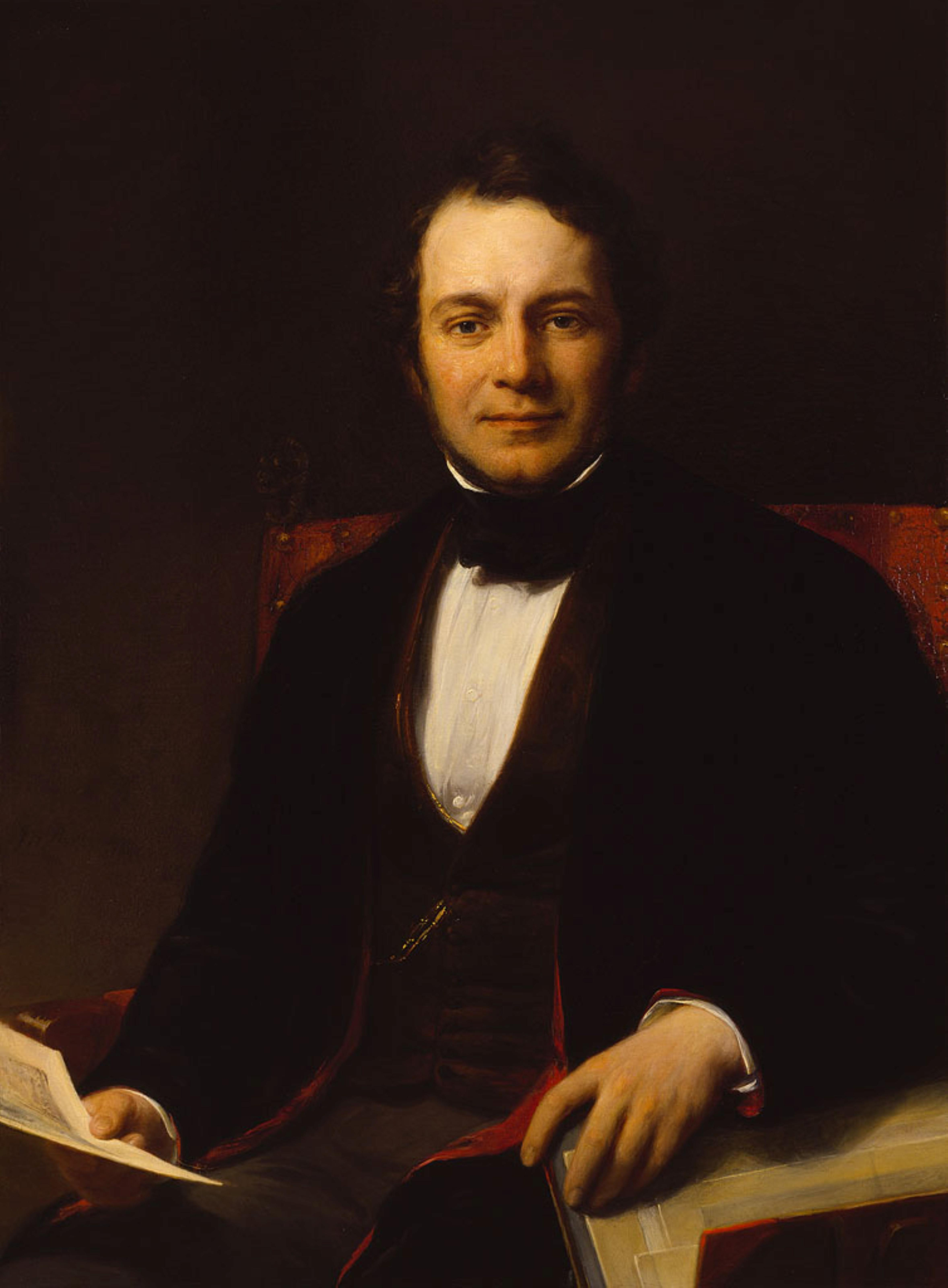
Portrait of Carel Joseph Fodor (1848)

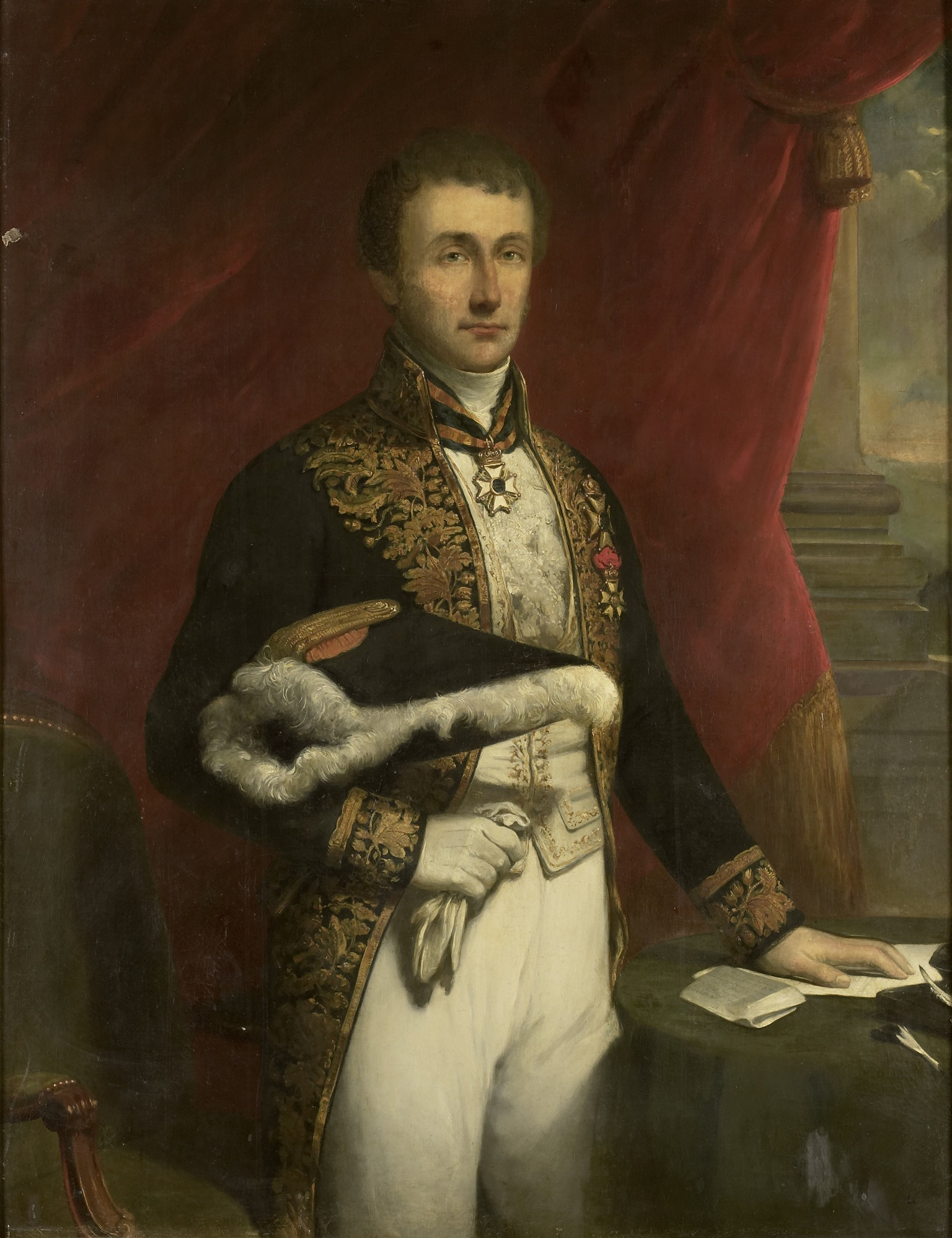
Portrait of Pieter Merkus
(c. 1844–1851)
