= Changuion =

Family history

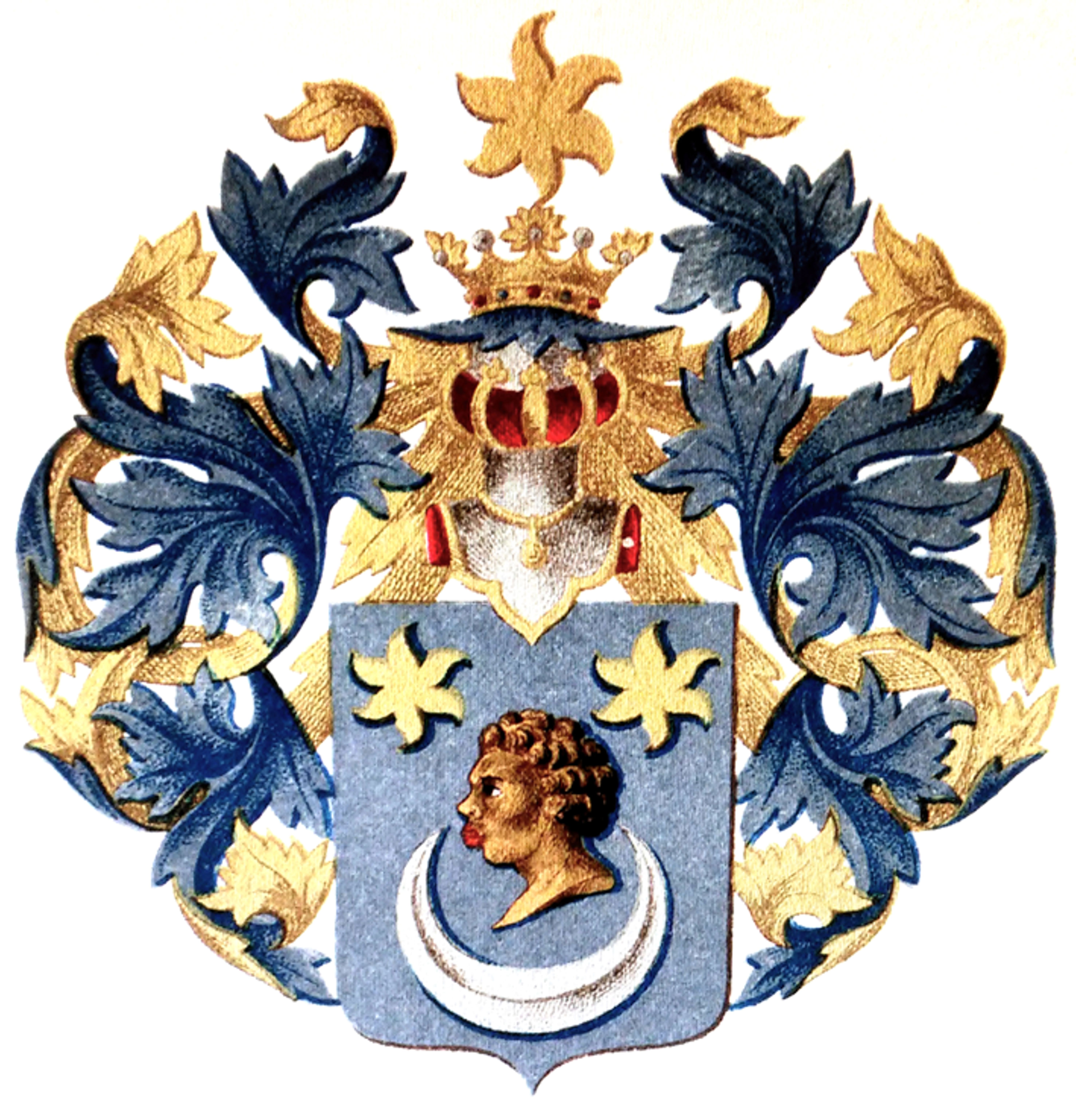
Coat of arms of F.D. Changuion (1766-1850) and his descendants

The Changuion family is a French-origin family with branches in France, the Netherlands, and South Africa. With roots traceable to at least the 16th century—and earlier mentions dating back to the 15th century—the family became known for its contributions to publishing, diplomacy, education, governance, religion, and the arts. Originally Huguenots from the Champagne region, members of the family fled religious persecution in the 17th century and settled in Protestant regions such as the Netherlands and Germany. One prominent member, François Daniël Changuion, was ennobled in the Netherlands in 1815 for his role in the founding of the Kingdom of the Netherlands. Today, descendants of the family live across Europe, Southern Africa, the United States, the United Kingdom, Australia, New Zealand, and beyond.

== History ==
=== Origins in France ===
The surname "Changuion" (pronunciation: [ʃɑ̃ɡɥijɔ̃]) may trace its origins to the commune of Champguyon, a village in the Brie region of Champagne, France. Historical records show that the name of the village evolved over centuries, with documented forms including Campus Guidonis (1161), Champ-Guidonis, Cham-Guion (1252), Changuon (late 1200s), Champguion (1395), and Changuyon (1804), reflecting a linguistic progression that may also underlie the family name.

The earliest known mentions of the surname itself date back to 1416, when a Professor François Changuion is recorded as teaching anatomy at the University of Paris. There are also references to Changuion family members residing in Toulouse in the early 1500s. While these earlier individuals are not directly connected to the documented lineage, they reflect the surname’s longstanding presence in France.

One of the first historically traceable members of the family appears in 1562, during the massacre of Wassy, a town in the old French province of Champagne. Pierre Changuion is named as one of the Protestant (Huguenot) churchgoers who were attacked by Roman Catholic forces.

In the decades following this event, some of Pierre's family moved to Vitry-le-François. As members of the bourgeoisie, many of them left France around the time of the revocation of the Edict of Nantes in 1685 due to the ensuing religious persecutions, settling in neighboring Protestant countries. Today, some members of the Changuion family still reside in the region of France from which the family originally came.

=== Migration and establishment in the Netherlands ===
One of the Dutch branches of the family sprang from a son of Pierre Changuion referred to above at the massacre of Wassy. This branch settled directly in Leiden in the Netherlands after leaving Wassy in 1686, and became involved in the textile industry. They would eventually produce lawyer, writer and administrator, Pierre-Jean Changuion (1763-1820), who was appointed as governor of the Colony of Curaçao and Dependencies in 1804. In the nineteenth century, this branch became extinct in the male line.

Another of the Dutch branches of the Changuion family, from which the South African branch also descends, came from a son of the above-mentioned Pierre Changuion, also called Pierre, who was buried in Wassy in 1634. A grandson of this Pierre, named Daniel Changuion, was born in Wassy in 1630 and settled in Vitry-le-Francois as a merchant. After the revocation of the Edict of Nantes, Daniel Changuion moved to Halle (Saale) in Germany with his son, Jean who was born in Vitry around 1660. One of Jean's sons, François (1694-1777) was baptised in Frankfurt (Oder) in 1694 and moved to Amsterdam in about 1717 where he was burgher and bookdealer. In 1724 Francois established a printing house, which would become very successful.

==== Elevation to nobility and controversy ====
One of Francois' grandsons, François Daniël Changuion (1766-1850), was elevated to the Dutch nobility on 16 September 1815 due to his role as secretary of the provisional government of the Netherlands (the Triumvirate under Van Hogendorp) in 1813. As such, he is considered one of the founders of the Kingdom of the Netherlands. His ennoblement allowed him and his descendants to use the predicate jonkheer and jonkvrouw. As a member of the nobility, he was granted the right to bear a crown in the crest of his coat of arms.

In 1823, François Changuion was convicted in absentia of fraud. Two years later, in 1825, the first list of the persons belonging to the nobility was compiled in the Netherlands. Only F.D. Changuion's children born before 27 February 1823 (the date of his sentencing), and not himself, were named on this list. These children remained part of the nobility, and could pass this status on to their descendants. This continues to be the official view of the High Council of Nobility in the Netherlands.

However, legal scholar Briët argued in 2019 that no formal decision stripping F.D. Changuion of his nobility was ever made, and that such a removal has no statutory or legal basis. Nevertheless, this view is not universally shared; F.D. Changuion is generally considered to have lost his noble status after 1825.

=== Expansion to South Africa ===
One of François Daniël's sons, Antoine Changuion (1803-1881), moved to South Africa in 1831 to take up a professorship at the South African Athenaeum (founded in 1829, later known as the South African College and now as the University of Cape Town).

From Antoine sprang two notable branches of the family in South Africa: one through his son Louis Annes Changuion (1840–1910), from whom all South African Changuions today descend and who continued the noble line; and another through his son Abraham Arnoldus Faure Changuion (1835–1877), the forefather of the Chanquin family.

Abraham entered into a union with a woman named Maggie, who was of Malay-Portuguese descent. While the exact nature of their relationship remains unclear, it occurred during a time when interracial unions in the Cape, though not unlawful, were often discouraged within colonial and noble European society. It is believed that their descendants adopted the surname Chanquion, later written Chanquin, possibly in response to social pressures or as an act of self-definition.

== Coat of arms ==
The coat of arms is described as in blue (azure), a Moor's head in natural color (proper), with two gold flaming stars above (or) and a silver crescent below (argent). For the noble branch of the family, a barred helm with a crown of three leaves and two pearls. Mantling: blue lined with gold. Crest: a star from the shield. The ancestral motto: Zèlé pour la Foi et le Roi ("Zeal for Faith and the King") appears in black letters on a white ribbon.

According to a centuries-old family tradition, the fleeing Changuions were sheltered by Muslims during their escape from religious persecution. Another interpretation suggests that the symbol may have originated during the time of the Crusades. Either way, as an expression of gratitude, a Moor's head - an established heraldic symbol historically associated with Muslims - was incorporated into the family's coat of arms.

== Some descendants ==
- François Changuion (1694-1777), burgher, bookdealer en publisher in Amsterdam.
  - François Changuion (1727-after 1776), council in the court of police and justice in Essequebo (then part of a Dutch colony and now the Cooperative Republic of Guyana) and president of the orphanage, commander of Essequebo, petty bourgeoisie of Deventer.
    - Jonkheer Dr. François Daniël Changuion (1766-1850), member of the city council and aldermen of Leiden, secretary of the provisional government (the Triumvirate under Van Hogendorp) in 1813, commissioner-general with the British troops, the first ambassador of the Netherlands to the United States of America, elevated to the Dutch nobility in 1815, not mentioned on the nobility list of 1825.
      - Prof. Jonkheer Dr. Antoine Nicolas Ernest Changuion (1803-1881), professor in Cape Town, prodigious writer in theological and literary fields; had nine children from which sprang an extensive progeny belonging to the Dutch nobility.
        - Jonkheer Abraham Arnoldus Faure Changuion (1835-1877), ancestor of the Chanquins of South Africa.
          - John Charles Chanquion (1862-1948).
          - Jennette Susan Chanquion (1869-1926).
        - Jonkheer Louis Annes Changuion (1840-1910), land surveyor in Robertson and ancestor of the Changuions of South Africa.
          - Jonkheer Antoine Nicolas Ernest Changuion (1865-1945), construction engineer and owner of a construction company.
          - Jonkvrouw Anne Eliza Changuion (1869–1971), Salvation Army officer who joined the Salvation Army’s work in South Africa and became Captain Anne Changuion before marrying in 1897. She served in South Africa, New Zealand, the Netherlands, Java, and the West Indies alongside her husband, John Cunningham (1870–1950), commissioner and territorial commander of the Salvation Army in South Africa and New Zealand, and deputy leader in the Netherlands. She played a supporting role in international missionary and humanitarian work, including the establishment of leprosy colonies and children’s ministries, and lived to the age of 102.
          - Jonkheer Francois Daniel Changuion (1874-1955), teacher.
          - Jonkheer Louis John Stanley Changuion (1875-1960), owner of a construction company and farmer.
            - Jonkheer Louis Annis Changuion (1910–1964), construction company owner and farmer.
              - Jonkvrouw Susanna Loraine Changuion (1938–2003), branch manager and later administrative head of an old-age home in Piet Retief.
              - Jonkvrouw Hilda Edith Changuion (1940–1973), businesswoman and owner of the first hair salon in Pongola.
              - Jonkvrouw Mirra Louise Changuion (1942–), nurse and hospital matron, who later served as a senior executive in the Transvaal Provincial Health Department, contributing to the management and development of public healthcare services in South Africa.
              - Colonel Jonkheer Louis John Stanley Changuion (1944–2024), farmer and businessman, served as commander of the Pongola Commando (a military reserve unit) from 1980 to 1985. He continued his military career as a lieutenant-colonel in the South African National Defence Force from 1985 to 2002, including serving in the National Key Point Secretariat. When the Secretariat moved to the South African Police Service, he transferred with it and served as a colonel until his retirement.
              - Jonkvrouw Alinda Magdalena Changuion (1946– ), businesswoman and insurance broker in Nigel.
              - Jonkheer Thomas Ferreira Changuion (1948–2016), farmer and businessman who served as chairman of the Pongola town council and the local health committee, contributing to municipal governance and public health oversight.
            - Jonkheer Frederick Johannes Abram Changuion (1913–1976), farmer and motor mechanic.
              - Jonkheer Dr. Louis John Stanley Changuion (1940–), professor of history at the University of the North and published author, known for his academic work on South African history and for writing Die familie Changuion van Suid-Afrika, a comprehensive history of the Changuion family.
          - Jonkheer Abraham Arnoldus Faure Changuion (1878-1970), nickel-plater.
            - Jonkheer Laurent Changuion (1914–1984), founding member of the Krugersdorp Pentecostal Holiness Church.
              - Jonkheer René Changuion, evangelist and founder of the Christian Motorcyclists Association (CMA) of South Africa. He is also CEO and founder of God’s Workshop Projects, a faith-based organization involved in community outreach and development initiatives.
            - Jonkheer Paul Luther Changuion (1918–2005), chief buyer for the RST Group in Zambia.
              - Jonkheer Paul Changuion (1945–), well-known photographer and the author of several photographic monographs.
- Dr. Pierre Changuion (1700-1758), councilor of Brabant and of Overmaas, in 1741 appointed chief judge of the feudal court of Brabant.
  - Dr. Paul Changuion (1733-1804), councilor and later city clerk of Vlissingen, appointed city clerk of Middelburg in 1774.
    - Dr. Pierre-Jean Changuion (1763-1820), secretary of the court of Holland until 1795, then member of the court of Den Bosch and Breda. From 1804 to 1807 he was governor of the Colony of Curaçao and Dependencies, which in that year was taken over by Great Britain; back in the Netherlands sentenced to death for the loss of Curacao but the verdict was reversed by Louis Napoléon. In 1814 he was restored in his honor by Willem I and appointed clerk of the court van Goes, and in 1816 appointed councilor-fiscal in the political council in Suriname and became secretary of this body in 1817.

== See also ==
- List of Dutch noble families
