= François Daniël Changuion =

Jonkheer François Daniël Changuion
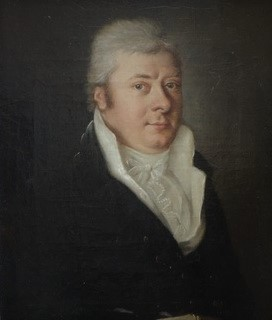
- François Daniël Changuion (c. 1800–1815)
- Born: 16 February 1766; Demerara
- Died: 15 June 1850 (aged 84); Offenbach am Main, Germany
- Occupations: Administrator, diplomat
- Known for: Secretary of the Provisional Government of 1813
- Spouse: Henriëtte Wilhelmina Hartingh
- Children: 5

Jonkheer François Daniël Changuion (Demerara, 16 February 1766 - Offenbach am Main, Germany, 15 June 1850), commonly known as Daniël Changuion, was a Dutch administrator and diplomat. In November 1813 he served as secretary of the Provisional Government of the Netherlands, commonly known as the Triumvirate, and is regarded in historiography as one of the founders of the Kingdom of the Netherlands.

Some of his descendants settled in South Africa in the nineteenth century.

== Family ==
The Changuion family is of French origin. François Daniël Changuion's grandfather, François Changuion (1694–1777), settled in Amsterdam in 1717 or 1718. His father, François Changuion (1727-c. 1778), served as a councilor of the court of justice in the Dutch colony of Essequibo, and his mother was Anna Geertruida (van) Gelskerke (1730-1795).

In the mid-1790s, Changuion had a relationship with Antonia van Limburgh (1766-1843), from which a son Fransch Antonie Changuion (1795-1797), was born.

=== Marriage and children ===
In 1800, Changuion married Henriëtte Wilhelmina Hartingh (1775-1860) in Emmerich. She was the daughter of Nicolaas Hartingh, a prominent resident of Leiden and son of Nicolaas Hartingh, a Dutch East India Company Governor, and Louise Ernestine Meyners.

Four children were born of this marriage:

- François Daniël Changuion (1801-1854)
- Louise Anne Changuion (1802-1872)
- Antoine Nicolas Ernest Changuion (1803-1881)
- Laurent Jonathan Changuion (1805-1851).

== Career ==
=== Early career ===
Changuion earned a doctorate in law at Leiden University in 1788. In the same year he was appointed councilor and alderman of Leiden. Following the proclamation of the Batavian Republic in 1795, he was dismissed from his administrative posts and left the Netherlands. In 1803, he returned to the Netherlands and settled in The Hague.

=== Role in the Triumvirate (1813) ===
In the Hague, Changuion became involved in the Triumvirate of 1813, a provisional governing body formed to manage the power vacuum following the collapse of French rule in the Netherlands.

From 17 to 29 November 1813, Changuion served as secretary of the Provisional Government. The Triumvirate under Gisjbert Karel van Hogendorp recalled Prince William of Orange from exile in Great Britain, after which he assumed the role of Sovereign Prince of the Netherlands. Owing to his role as secretary, Changuion is regarded as one of the founders of the Kingdom of the Netherlands. His name is listed with the members of the Triumvirate on the monument at Plein 1813 in The Hague.

=== Diplomatic appointments ===
In January 1814, Changuion was appointed by the Sovereign Prince as the first Dutch envoy to the United States of America. He departed for the United States with his family in May 1814. Due to the War of 1812 and the prevailing political uncertainty, his diplomatic activities there were limited.

In May 1815, Changuion learned that he had already been appointed envoy to Constantinople in December 1814. He was never sent to that post. The precise reason is not officially documented, but contemporary sources indicate that rumours concerning his financial solvency, as well as the high costs and financial risks associated with the Constantinople post, may have played a role.

=== Later years ===
In 1818, Changuion repeatedly petitioned to be appointed Governor-General of Suriname, citing his extensive knowledge of the West Indian colonies and proposing that he could serve at a lower salary than other candidates. After consultations among ministers, including those of Colonies and Foreign Affairs, his requests were declined. He was pensioned effective 1 October 1818.

Personal correspondence from around 1818 indicates that Changuion’s financial position had deteriorated severely. According to sources, he subsequently engaged in the forgery and collection of bills at the expense of old acquaintances, to the amount of 44,000 guilders. After collecting these funds in the Netherlands, he fled to Germany. Requests for his extradition to the Netherlands were unsuccessful. On 27 February 1823, Changuion was convicted in absentia by a Dutch court and sentenced to ten years' imprisonment and a fine of 11,000 guilders.

== Nobility ==
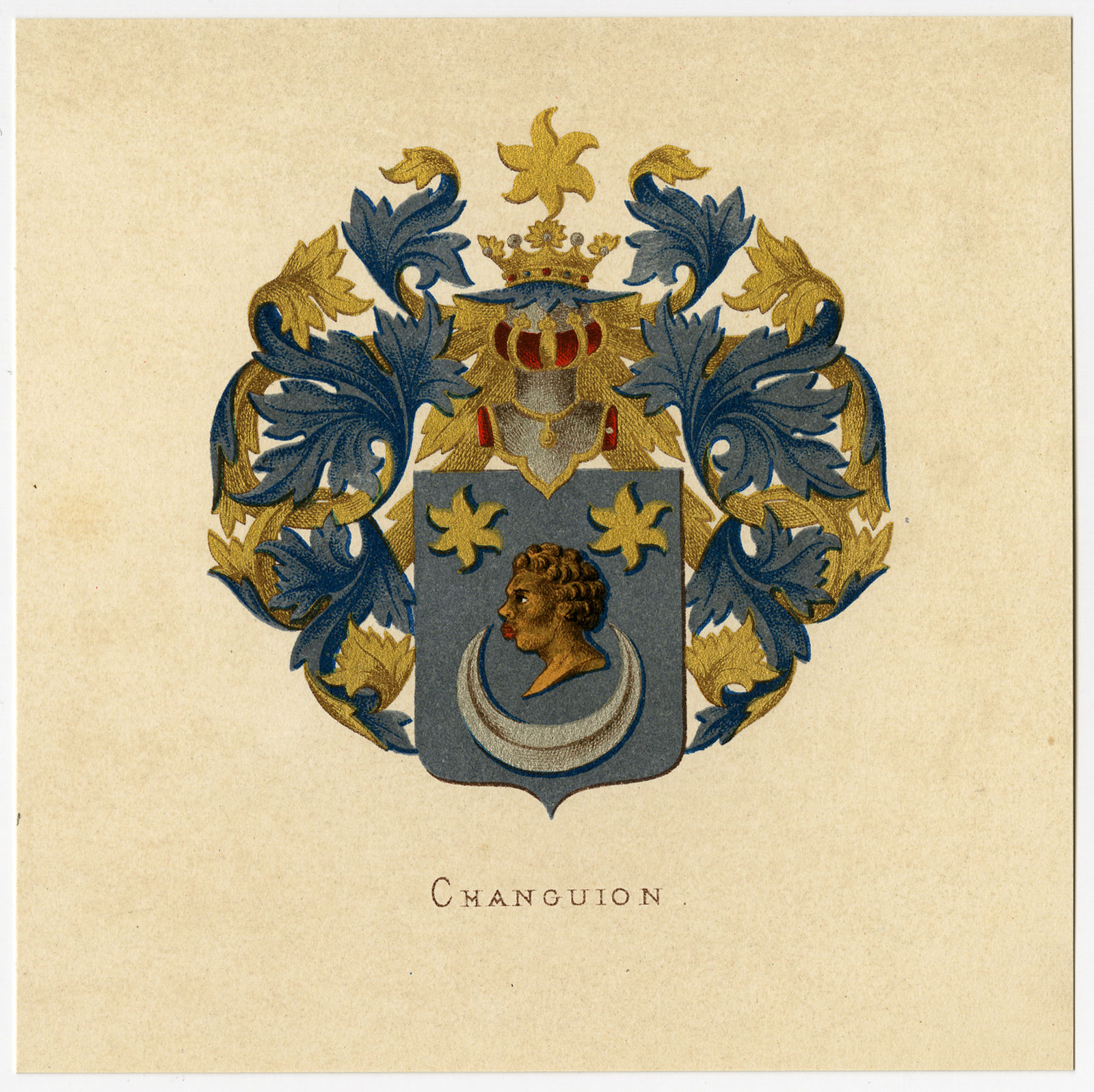
Coat of arms of François Daniël Changuion (1766-1850) and his descendants.

In 1815, François Daniël Changuion was elevated to the Dutch nobility by King Willem I in recognition of his role as secretary of the Provisional Government of 1813 (the Triumvirate under Van Hogendorp). Accordingly, he and his descendants were granted the right to use the predicate Jonkheer or Jonkvrouw.

As a result of his later conviction, Changuion was not included in the first list of persons belonging to the Dutch nobility published in 1825. His children, all of whom were born prior to the date of his sentence, were included in this list, retained their noble status and transmitted it to their descendants. This is position is upheld by the High Council of Nobility of the Netherlands.

== Legacy ==
François Daniël Changuion died in Germany in 1850 at the age of 84. His widow, Henriëtte Wilhelmina Hartingh, died in 1860.

Of his children, only one continued the family line. His son Antoine Nicolas Ernest Changuion (1803-1881), settled in Cape Town in 1831 and became the progenitor of a large South African lineage, part of which is recognised as noble under Dutch nobiliary law. His South African descendants span multiple communities and social backgrounds.
