= Sovereign Principality of the United Netherlands =

1813–1815 precursor of the United Kingdom of the Netherlands

Coordinates: 52°19′N 5°33′E

Sovereign Principality of the United Netherlands Soeverein Vorstendom der Verenigde Nederlanden
- 1813–1815
- Flag Coat of arms

- The Principality shown in dark yellow
- Capital: Amsterdam
- Common languages: Dutch
- Religion: Dutch Reformed; Catholicism
- Demonym: Dutch
- Government: Absolute monarchy (until 1814); Unitary parliamentary semi-constitutional monarchy (from 1814)
- Sovereign Prince
  - 1813–1815: William Frederick
- Legislature: States General
- Historical era: Early Modern
  - Triumvirate of 1813: 20 November 1813
  - Constitution adopted: 29 March 1814
  - London Protocol: 21 June 1814
  - Anglo-Dutch Treaty: 13 August 1814
  - Congress of Vienna: 16 March 1815

Population
  - 1815: 2,233,000
- Currency: Dutch guilder
Preceded by	Succeeded by
First French Empire	United Kingdom of the Netherlands

The Sovereign Principality of the United Netherlands (Dutch, old spelling: Souverein Vorstendom der Vereenigde Nederlanden) was a short-lived sovereign principality and the precursor of the United Kingdom of the Netherlands, in which it was reunited with the Southern Netherlands in 1815. The principality was proclaimed in 1813 when the victors of the Napoleonic Wars established a political reorganisation of Europe, which would eventually be defined by the Congress of Vienna. It is the direct legal ancestor of the modern Dutch state.

== Proclamation ==
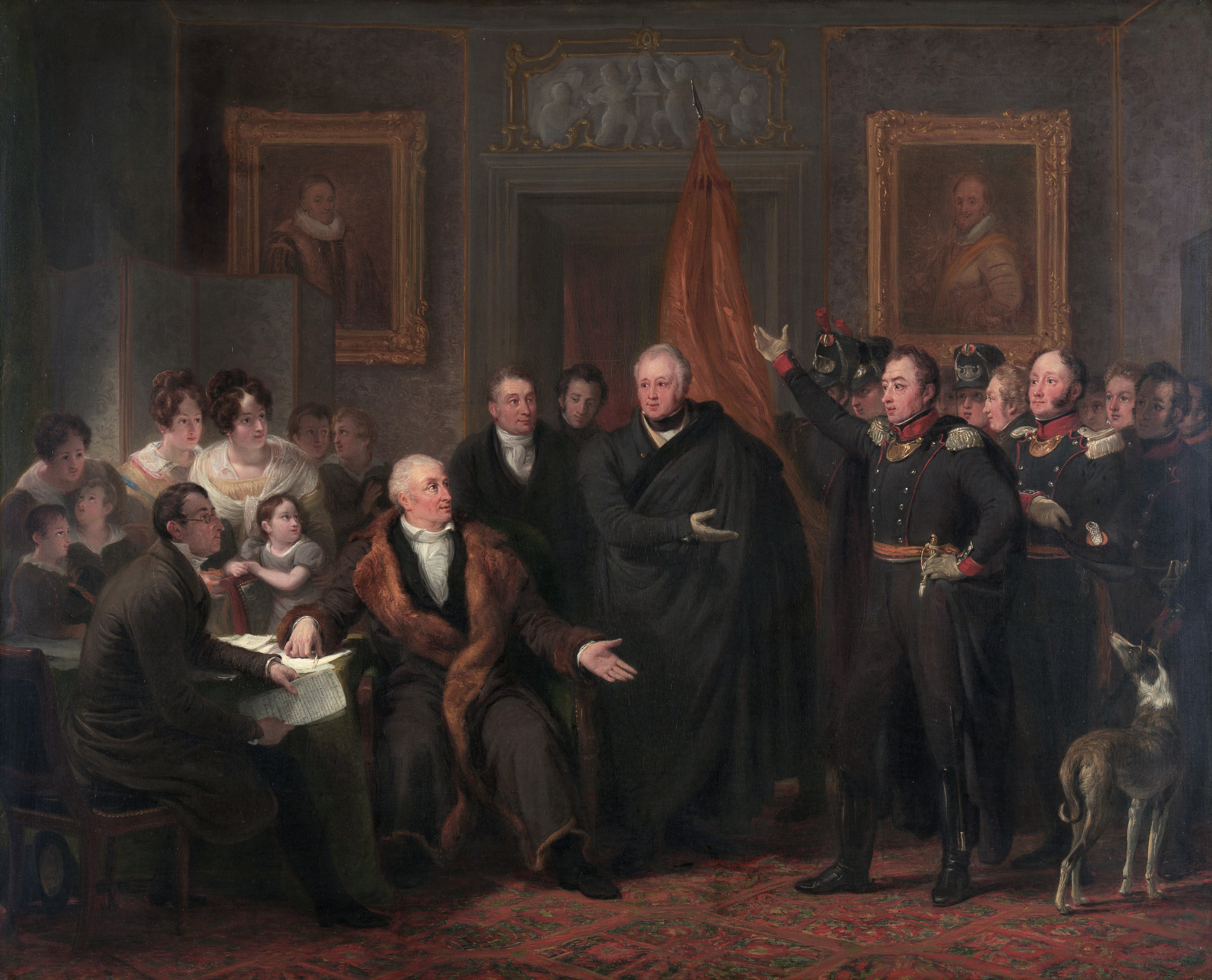
The Triumvirate Assuming Power on Behalf of the Prince of Orange by Jan Willem Pieneman, 1828.

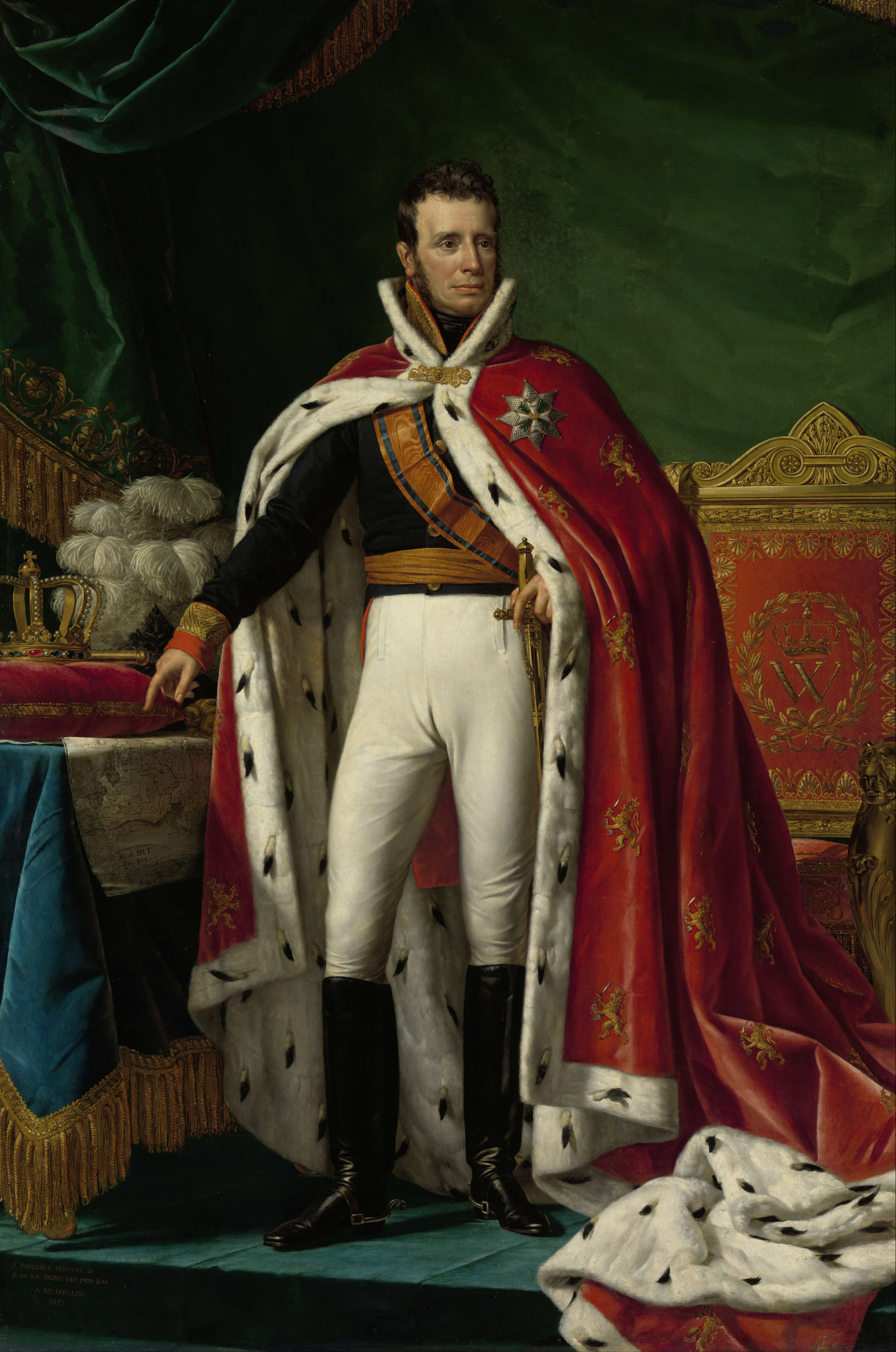
William Frederick, Sovereign Prince of the United Netherlands Portrait of William I by Joseph Paelinck, 1819

After the liberation of the Netherlands from France by Prussian and Russian troops in 1813, a provisional government took over the country. It was headed by a triumvirate of Dutch noblemen, Frans Adam van der Duyn van Maasdam, Leopold of Limburg Stirum and Gijsbert Karel van Hogendorp. This Triumvirate of 1813 formally took control over the liberated country on 20 November and declared the Principality of the United Netherlands a day thereafter.

It was a foregone conclusion that any new government would have to be headed by William Frederick, the son of the last Stadtholder of the Dutch Republic, William V. Although many members of the provisional government had helped drive out William V eighteen years earlier, most of its leading members agreed that it would be better for the Dutch to invite William Frederick themselves rather than have him imposed by the Allies. After receiving an invitation from the Triumvirate, William Frederick returned from his exile in Great Britain. He disembarked from HMS Warrior and landed at Scheveningen beach on 30 November 1813. While the Triumvirate offered to make him king, William Frederick turned it down, instead proclaiming himself "Sovereign Prince" of the United Netherlands on 2 December. He also insisted on "a wise constitution" for the liberated country.

== Constitution ==
Later that year, a commission seated by Gijsbert Karel van Hogendorp was assembled and tasked with drafting a constitution. On 29 March 1814, a so-called "Assembly of Notables" met in Amsterdam to vote for the final draft. 474 of the 600 members of this assembly showed up to vote and only 26 of them, mostly Roman Catholics, voted against it resulting in the draft being accepted by a vast majority. The constitution, which would be in force for over a year, introduced a centralised monarchy in which the prince held much power, although it did contain some democratic elements. A unicameral States General was introduced with its 55 members elected provincially by the States-Provincial. Those States were in turn elected by cities, countryside and nobility. The States General had the right of initiative and had to approve or disapprove all proposed legislation. However, the prince could settle many affairs by decree, greatly limiting the say of the States General. The power of the provinces and cities was considerably limited compared to during the Dutch Republic. Several fundamental rights were adopted from the French period. The constitution included freedom of religion and there were provisions of law and criminal procedure. William Frederick was formally inaugurated as sovereign prince by the assembly in the New Church in Amsterdam on 30 March.

== Reunification ==
In the former Austrian Netherlands, conquered by France in 1794 and annexed in 1795, the Allies made quick progress also. This presented the problem of what to do with this country. The thirty most prominent families of Brussels expressed the wish to restore the old Governorate-general of the Austrians and this was provisionally instituted by the Allies in February 1814 as their military government. However, Austria itself expressed little interest in resuming its rule. Therefore, the Allies provisionally apportioned the country to the new Dutch state in the secret annexes to the Treaty of Chaumont. This was further formalised in the Treaty of Paris of 30 May 1814, in which Belgium on the left bank of the river Meuse was apportioned to the (future) Netherlands, whereas the fate of the right bank was to be determined later.

How this was to be structured was however still to be decided, while certain expectations had been raised by the representatives of the Belgian people at Chaumont in February that also needed to be honoured in some way. These "loose ends" were taken care of in the protocol that came to be known as the "Eight Articles of London". Under this treaty signed on 21 June 1814, William Frederick was awarded with the former Austrian Netherlands. He became Governor-General of Belgium on 1 August, leading to personal union between Northern and Southern Netherlands. For all intents and purposes, William Frederick had completed the House of Orange's three-century quest to unite the Low Countries.

William Frederick subsequently tried to get the assent of the (carefully selected) representatives of the Belgian people to the Dutch constitution, but encountered opposition from those who were suspicious of designs to undermine the position of the Catholic Church in those provinces. Nonetheless, the reunification was finalised on 16 March 1815 when William Frederick was proclaimed King William I of the United Kingdom of the Netherlands in Brussels.
