= Antoine Changuion =

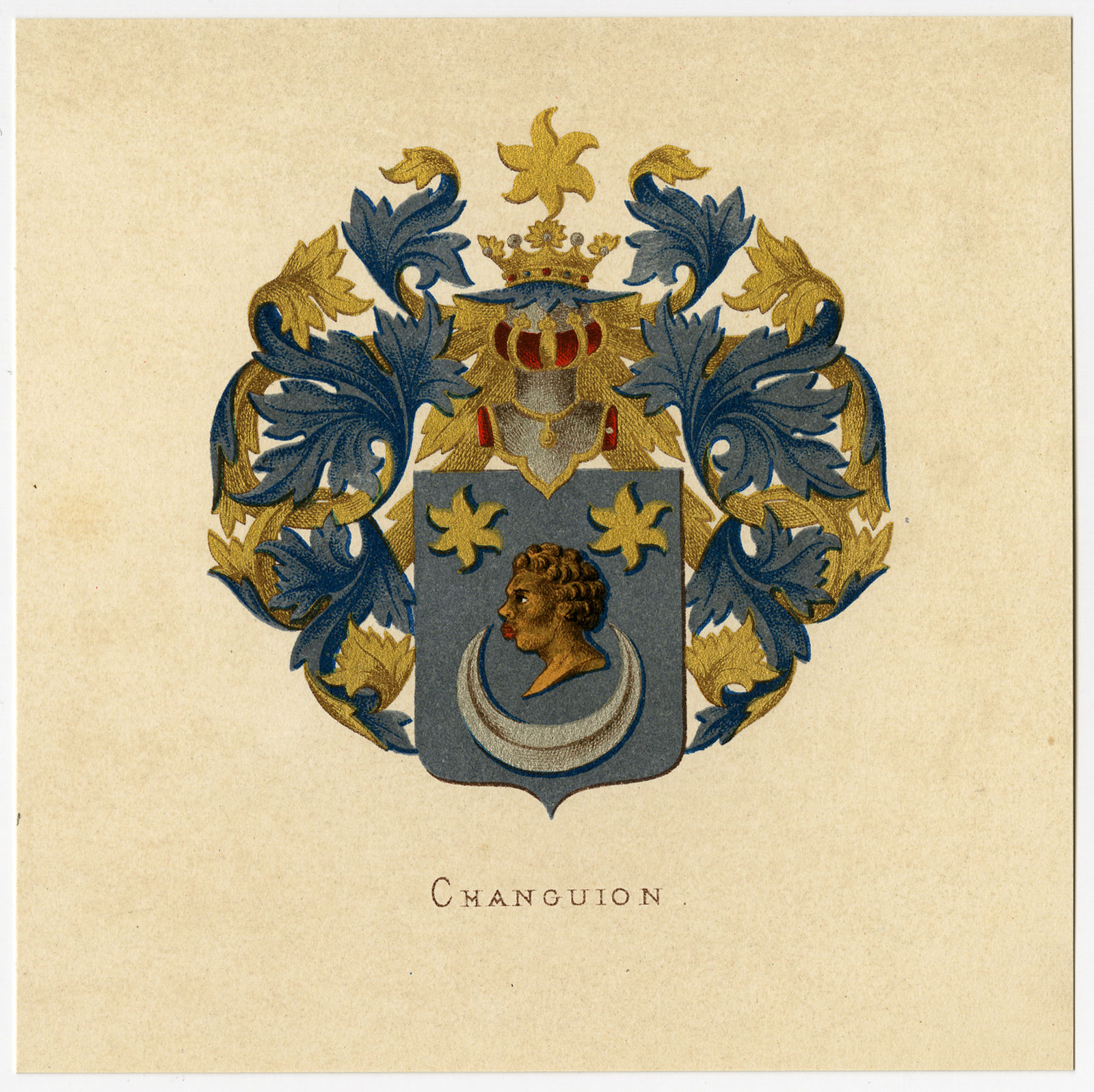
Changuion Family Coat of Arms

Jonkheer Antoine Nicolas Ernest Changuion (15 December 1803 in The Hague – 14 October 1881 in Lörrach, Switzerland) was a Dutch educator, writer, politician, orator, journalist, and main leader of the Dutch movement in Cape Colony.

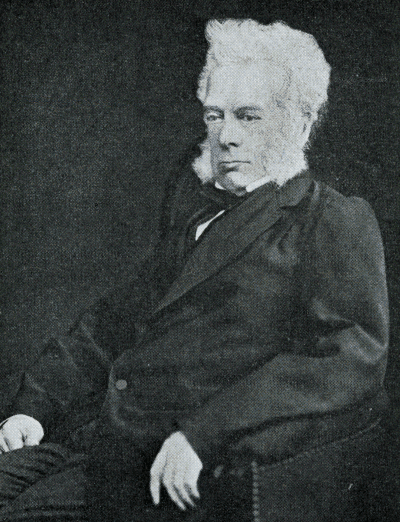
Antoine Changuion.

== Ancestry ==
His lineage stems from Dutch nobility, with the earliest documented origin of the Changuion family being from France where his ancestor, Pierre Changuion, a Huguenot farmer, had his lands and home burned along with his entire village during the Massacre of Vassy (1562). After this event the Changuions still remained in numbers in France. A large part of the Changuion family eventually emigrated to the Netherlands in 1685.

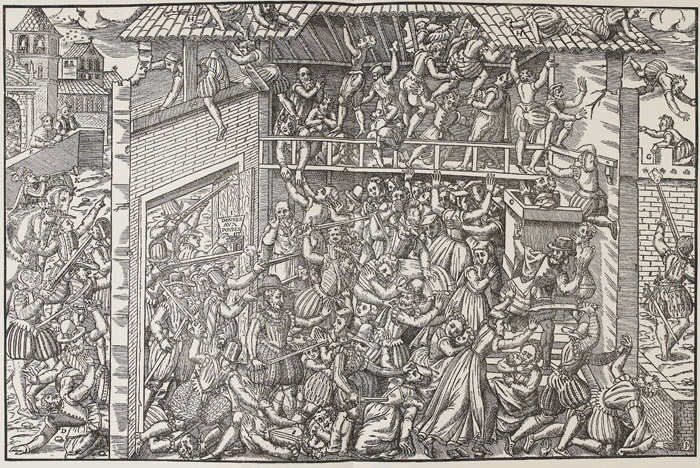
Massacre of Vassy (1562)

== Early life ==
Due to the financial problems of Antoine 's parents, François Daniël Changuion (politician, diplomat, including the first Dutch ambassador in the US, and elevated to the Dutch nobility in 1815 for his role as secretary of the provisional government, the Triumvirate of 1813 under Van Hogendorp) and Henriëtta Wilhelmina Hartingh (daughter of a prominent Leidener, son and namesake of governor Nicolaas Hartingh, and Louise Ernestine Meyners) they left public life and in 1820 moved to Germany and for the next 30 years lived in Offenbach am Main, where Antoine at an early age came to learn and admire the German language and its literature. He also learned French and English, eventually teaching both in Frankfurt. Later he gave lessons in Amsterdam in German, French, and English, while he studied Latin and Greek at the same time. In 1828 as a student in literature and theology at the University of Leiden he began his writing career.

== Career ==
In 1831 he accepted a professorship in classical and modern languages, focusing on Dutch literature, at the South African Athenaeum (founded in 1829; later known as the South African College, now the University of Cape Town). At Leiden University, he held the title of Philosophy Theoreticae Master et Litirarum Doctor Humaniorum (honoris causa). At the South African Athenaeum he remained in this position until 1842 when he resigned for various reasons. He was married on 25 September 1832 to ME Faure, daughter of Dr. Abraham Faure and Susanna Smuts. From this marriage he had six sons and three daughters.

== Linguist ==
Changuion was a linguist and educator who promoted the teaching of linguistics and languages to Dutch speakers in South Africa and beyond. He authored and published some of the first schoolbooks in South Africa and worked directly with children in educational settings.

Among other school books, he authored:

- Geslachtwijzer der Nederduitsche Language (1842)
- Principles der Cijferkunst (1857)
- Elements of English Grammar (1860)

In his most renowned work, Dutch Language in South Africa (1844, second edition 1848), he created the first manual and guide for the Afrikaner language as a stem of Dutch, listing vernacular and peculiarities alike. It was also partly a Dutch guide to all citizens of South Africa. In this book he also gave examples of Cape Dutch language features that were unique to the Cape. This "Kaapsche idiom", he described in a separate chapter titled test of Kaapsch idiom.

== Later Years and Death ==
Changuion was far ahead of his time, especially in his new homeland of Cape Colony, in many ways. However he eventually became very lonely, and after more than 33 years of tireless efforts, he nevertheless decided to return to Europe. In 1865 he left the Cape with his sister, Louise, his wife, and two of his daughters. He became a teacher in Frankfurt and Aarau. In 1876 he settled in Lausanne, Switzerland and later in Lörrach, where he died in 1881. Changuion became the progenitor of a numerous offspring in South Africa who belong to the Dutch nobility.

== Criticism ==
A strong reaction to the test of Kaapsch idiom came from JS de Lima. De Lima was also a familiar language activist for Dutch at the Cape. In a brochure titled De Taal der Kapernaren, verdedigd tegen de schandelijke aanranding derzelve van Professor Changuion (1844) Lima objected to Changuion's examples of the language used at the Cape. Lima was highly indignant and wrote that Changuion's examples were flawed and were not representative of the upper classes of South Africa.

Later African linguists used precisely the Kaapsch idiom test that Changuion used to indicate that English was developing across South Africa.
