= Adrichem Castle =

Former castle in Beverwijk, the Netherlands

Coordinates: 52.489296°N 4.669525°E

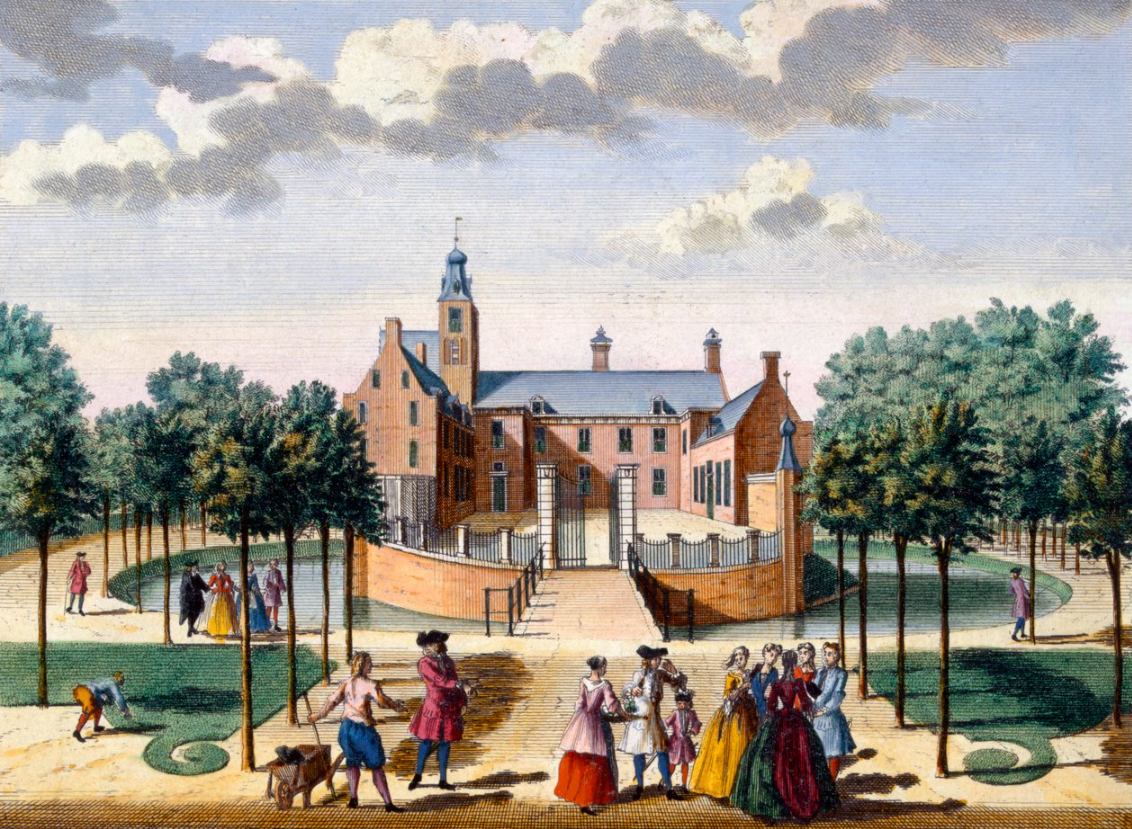
Adrichem Castle in the 18th century as depicted in Zegepralend Kennemerland

Adrichem Castle (Dutch: Huis Adrichem or Dutch: Kasteel Adrichem) was located in Beverwijk, the Netherlands. Constructed as a stronghold in the Middle Ages, it served in the 17th and 18th century as a country retreat for rich merchant families from Amsterdam. At the start of the 19th century, during the French reign over the Netherlands, it has been demolished. Today, nothing remains from the castle and it is home to a camping.

== Location ==
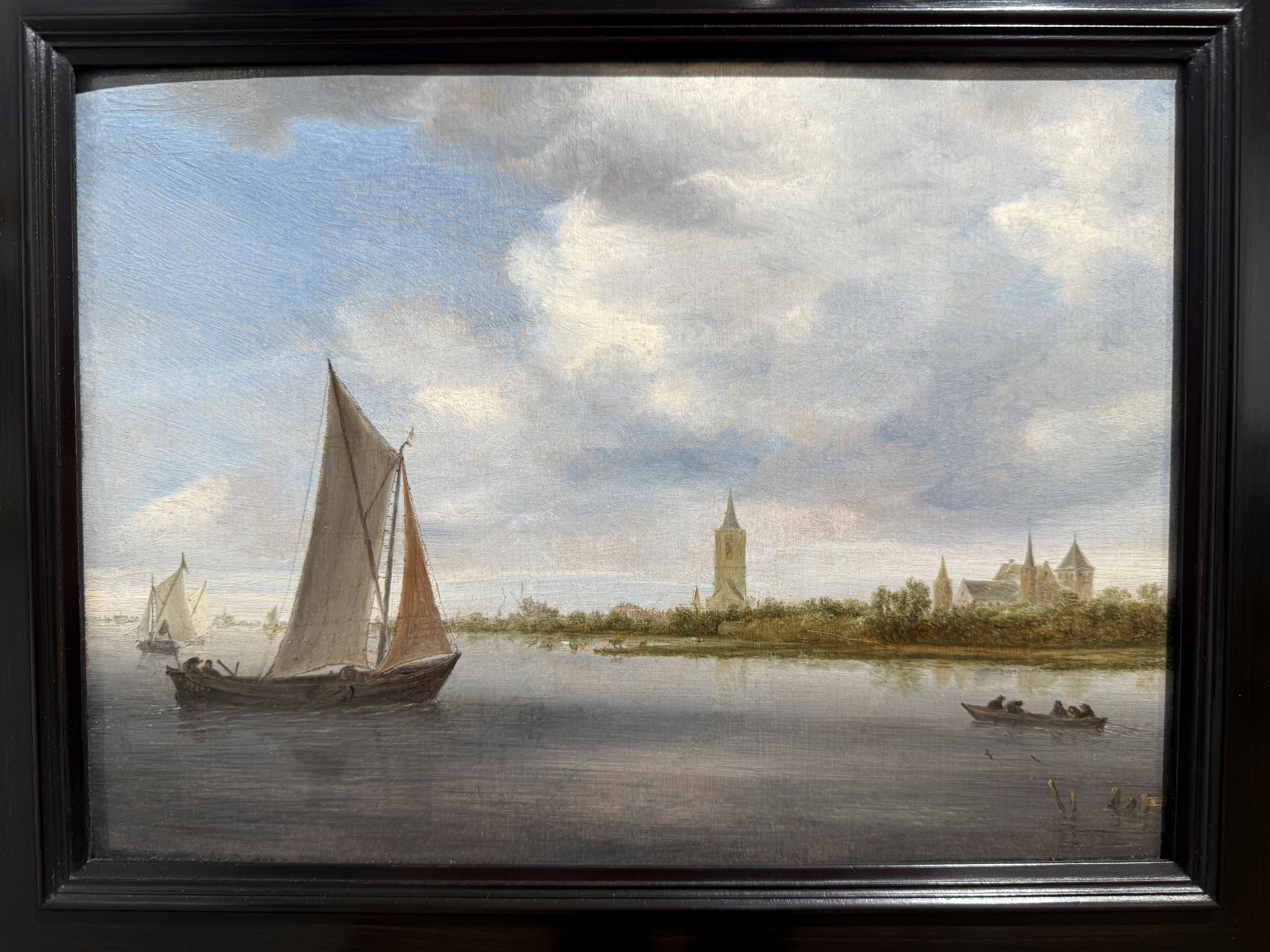
On this 17th century painting, Salomon van Ruysdael depicted Beverwijk, the Wijkermeer and Adrichem Castle

Adrichem castle was located at the Sint Aagtendijk in Beverwijk. It was located close to the Wijkermeer.

== History ==
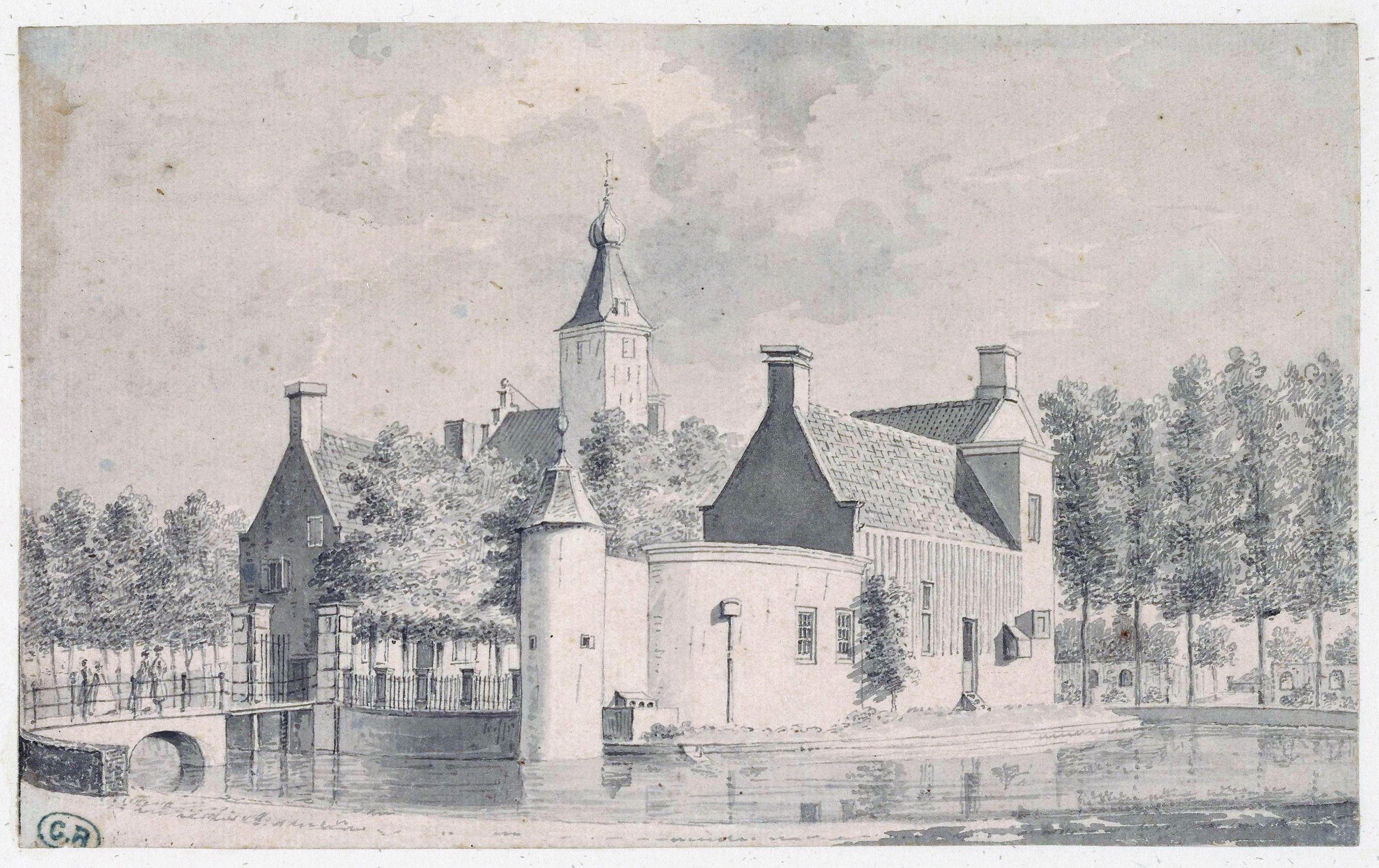
Adrichem Castle

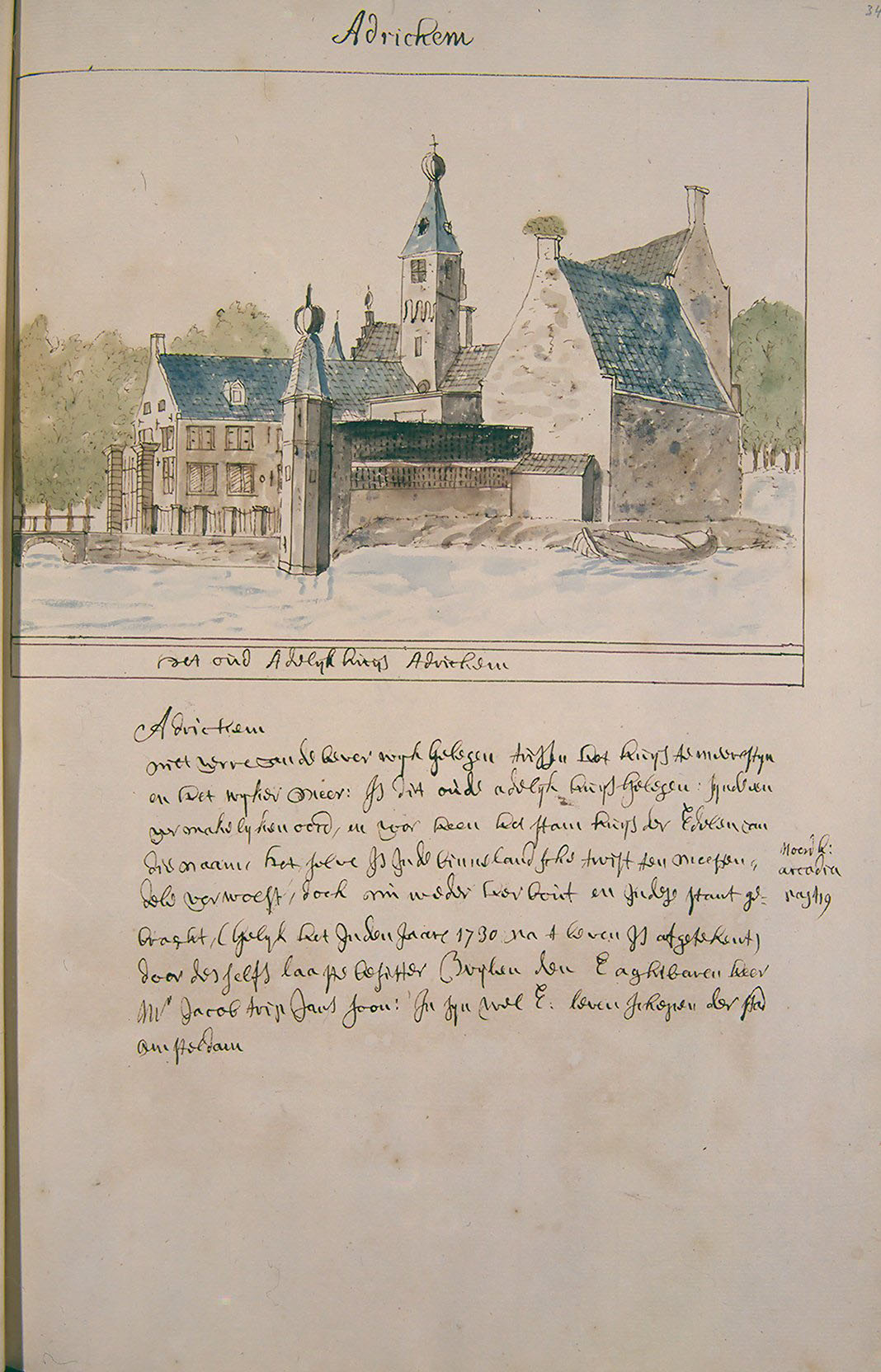
Adrichem Castle

=== Gerard van Velsen ===
The first castle at this site belonged to Gerard van Velsen, lord of Beverwijk, Noordwijk en Velsen. Gerard, along with other noblemen, conspired to kidnap Floris V, Count of Holland, imprisoning him at Muiden Castle. On 27 June 1296, Floris attempted to escape, but the noblemen intercepted and murdered him, stabbing him 20 times. Shortly afterward, Gerard was arrested, tried, and executed. His lands were confiscated, and his castle was razed. The apparent motive behind the murder is widely thought to have been Floris V's alleged rape of Van Velsen's wife, who is said to have taken her own life as a result.

=== The Adrichem Family ===
In 1326, Dirk van Valkenburg built a second castle at the site. Dirk is thought to have been an illegitimate son of Dirk III van Brederode. By the mid-14th century, the Adrichem family had acquired the property, giving the castle their name. The first of the family to own it was Floris van Adrichem, who took possession in 1365. Floris was an active participant in the Hook and Cod wars, aligning himself with the Hook faction. During this period, he notably took part in a siege on the nearby Marquette Castle in Heemskerk.

The Adrichem family held the castle until the 16th century. During the Eighty Years' War, the castle sustained significant damage. However, its then-owner, Lieven van den Burgh, restored it to its traditional form, preserving its original style and historical significance.

=== A Country retreat ===
During the 17th and 18th centuries, Adrichem Castle passed into the hands of wealthy Amsterdam merchant families, including the Trip and Rendorp families (who also owned Marquette). Under their ownership, the castle evolved from a fortified stronghold into an elegant country estate. The new owners expanded the castle, changing both exterior and interior, and formal French gardens were created around it, enhancing its stature as a stately home.

Mid 17th century, the castle was depicted in three drawings by Roelant Roghman, of which two are now in the collections of the Teylers Museum in Haarlem, and one in a private collection. In the early 18th century, the book Zegepralend Kennemerland (English: Triumphant Kennemerland) was published, highlighting the opulent estates of wealthy merchants in the Kennemerland region, near Beverwijk and Haarlem. Adrichem Castle was one of the notable residences featured in the book.

=== The end: Gijsbert Karel van Hogendorp ===
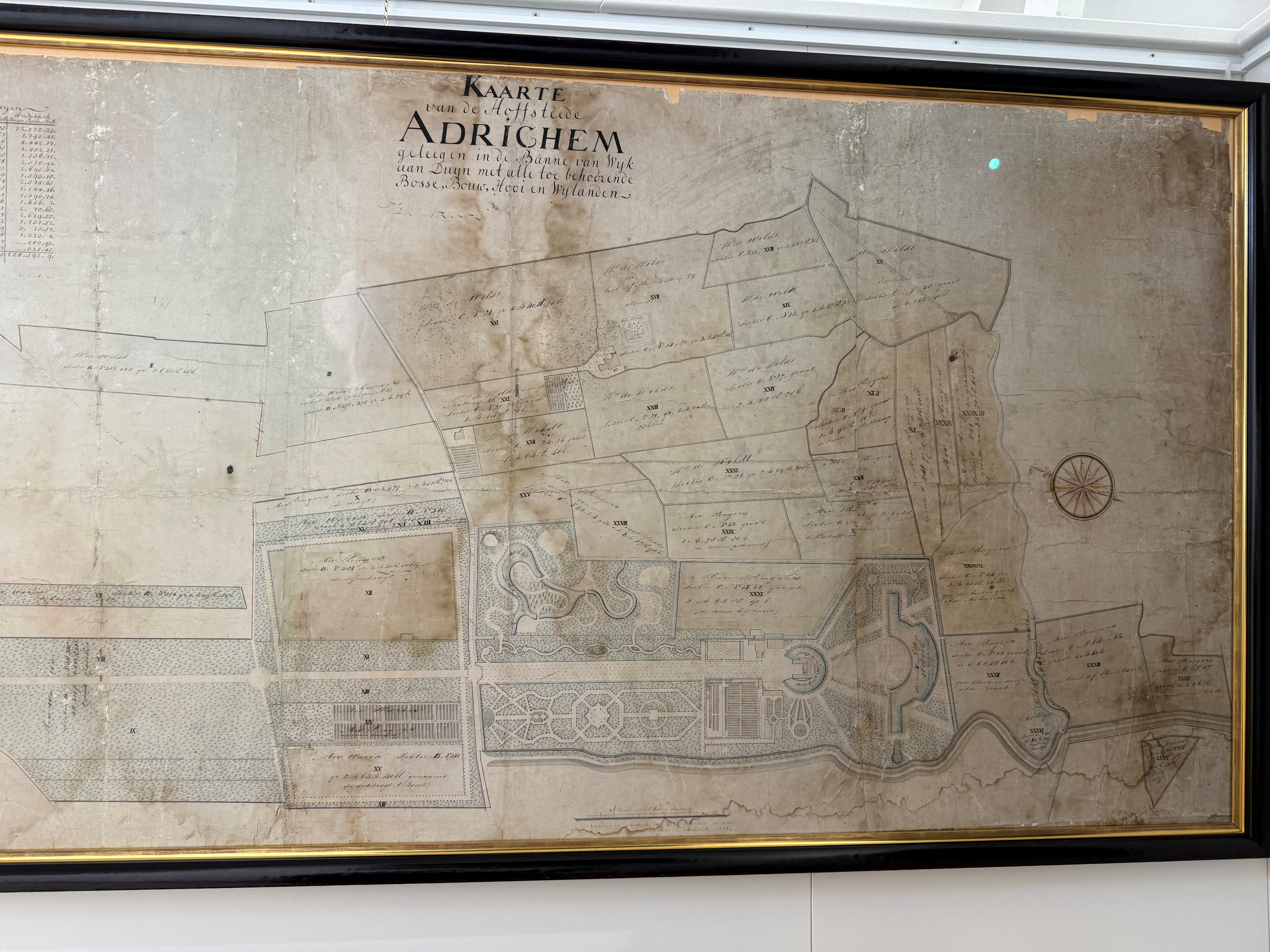
The castle and surroundings on a map dating from 1777

Gijsbert Karel van Hogendorp (1762–1834) was a liberal conservative and liberal Dutch statesman, became the last owner of Adrichem Castle through his marriage to Hester Clifford, an heiress from a prosperous Amsterdam merchant family. The Van Hogendorps used the castle as their summer residence. However, in 1799, following the Battle of Castricum, soldiers from the Franco-Dutch forces were quartered in the castle. Their stay left the castle in a worn and deteriorated state, with drafts and structural issues.

Attempts to sell the castle in 1805 were unsuccessful, leading the Van Hogendorps to relocate to The Hague in 1808. With the property increasingly difficult to maintain, Gijsbert ultimately decided to demolish the castle, which took place between 1809 and 1812, marking the end of Adrichem Castle's long history.

Gijsbert headed the commission that wrote the Constitution of the Netherlands of 1814. It is assumed that the first drafts of this constitution were drawn at Adrichem castle.

=== Today ===
Nothing remains anymore of Adrichem castle. On its location is nowadays a campsite located, which is surrounded by sport fields. In the location of the outer baily, an old farm Hoeve Adrichem named houses a restaurant.

Archeological excavations were performed in 1955, 1967 and 2000.

Museum Kennemerland in Beverwijk has in its collections a map of the castle and its direct surroundings, dating from 1777. In these the times, the gardens were already updated according the latest fashion, from French Formal to an English Landscape Garden.

== The Castle Interior ==
Some information about the interior of the castle is available from a description drawn up for the 1805 auction. One would enter Adrichem castle through a vestibule with a marble floor, followed by a large hall decorated with Corinthian pilasters and mirrors. On the left side of this is a large room with mirrors as well, East Indian Silk on the wall and a marble chimney, followed by a dining room decorated with the four seasons, and a library with a dome-like stucco ceiling. From a balcony at the rear, visitors could admire the gardens. The upper floor had rooms for guests.

== The Swane Maiden of Adrichem Castle ==
There is a legend associated with the castle, which was written down in the book Kennemer Balladen by W.J. Hofdijk:

The Lord of Adrichem lived alone in his grand castle. One day, he spotted a beautiful swan maiden swimming in the waters near his home. She had laid aside her swan garment, and the lord seized his opportunity. He took the garment, leaving her no choice but to follow him to the castle. From that moment on, they lived together as husband and wife.

Years later, however, the lord decided he wanted a regular wife instead. Upon hearing this, the swan maiden was overcome with grief, collapsed to the ground, and died. In the form of a sorrowful swan, she vanished into nothingness. Later, when misfortune threatened the castle, passersby reported hearing sorrowful sounds and saw a magnificent white swan floating above Adrichem Castle.

== Gallery: Development of Adrichem Castle over time ==
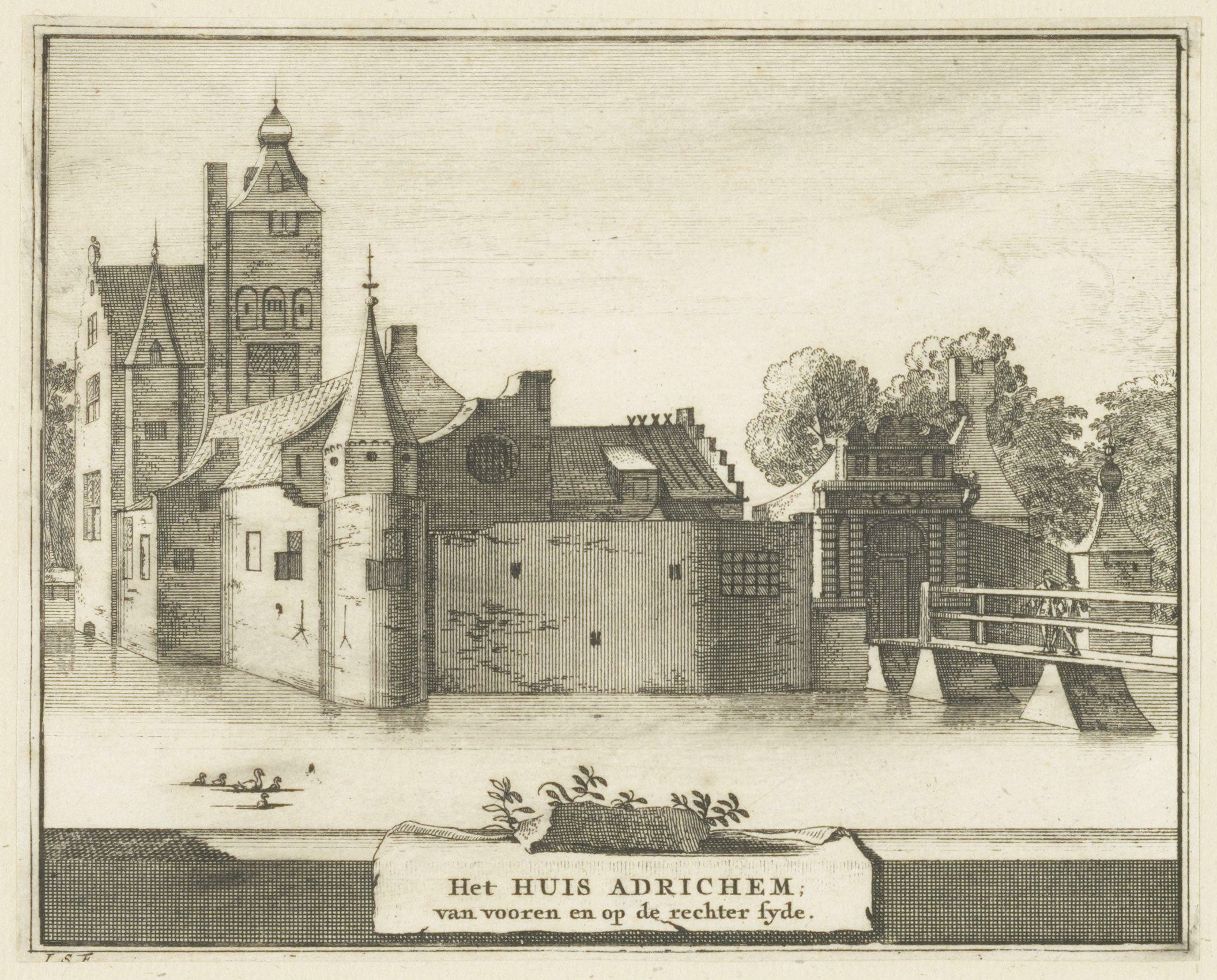
The castle at the start of the 17th century

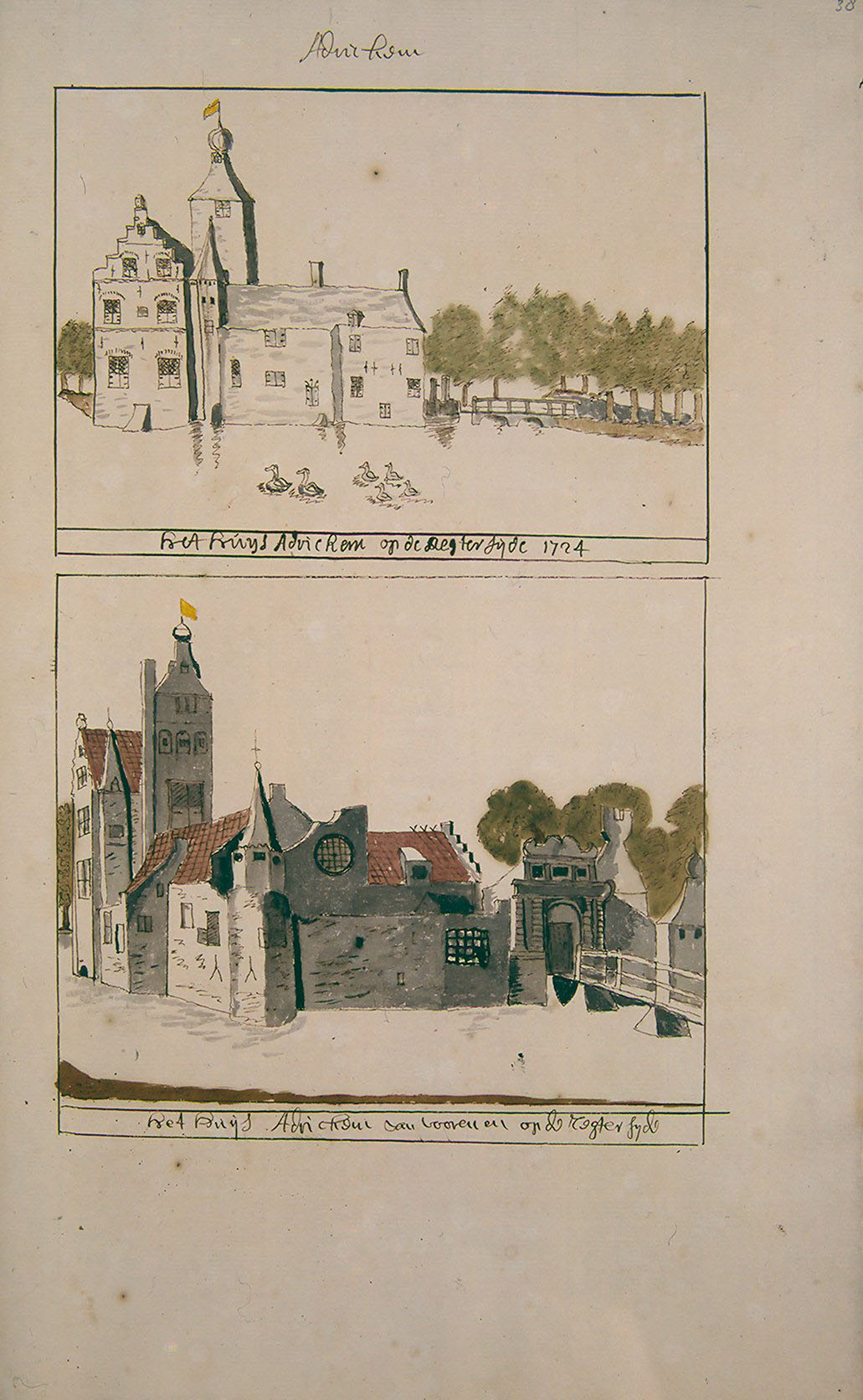
The 17th century castle

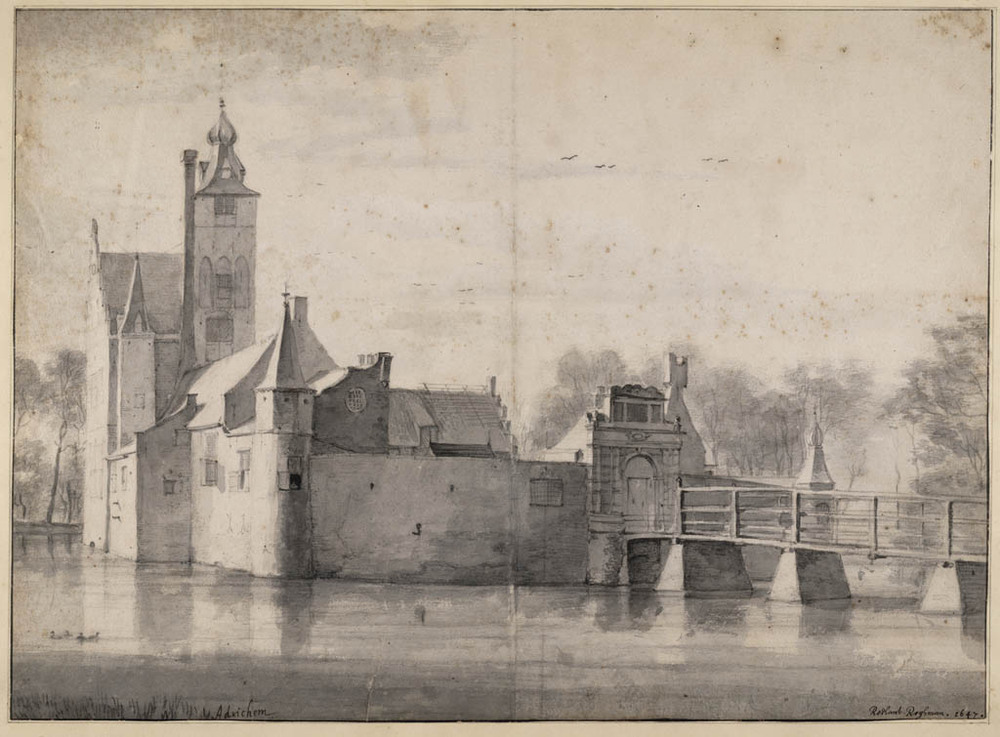
The front of the castle drawn by Roelant Roghman (1647) (Teylers Museum)

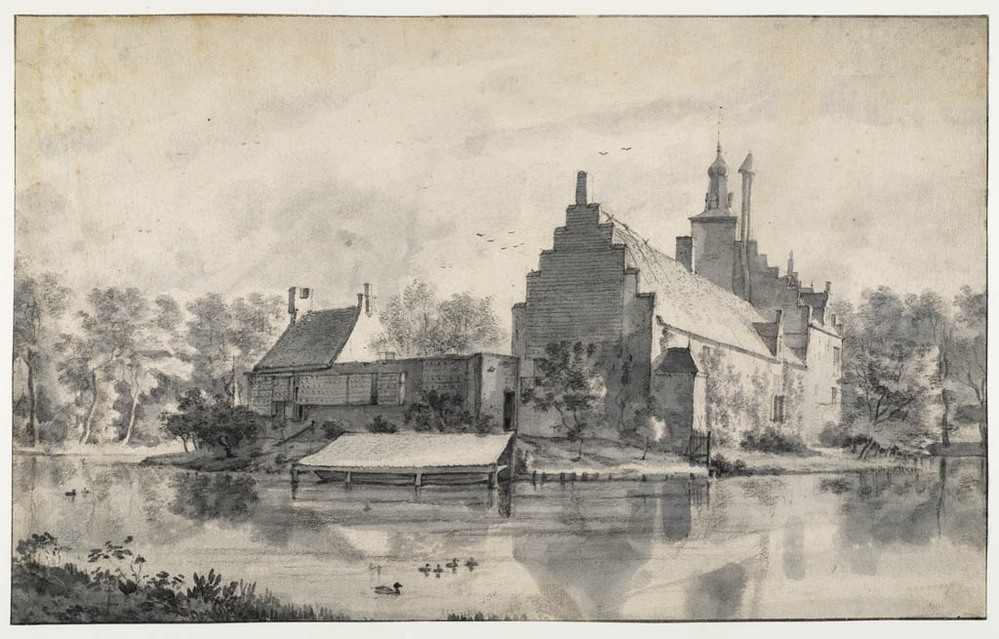
The rear of the castle drawn by Roelant Roghman (1647) (Teylers Museum)

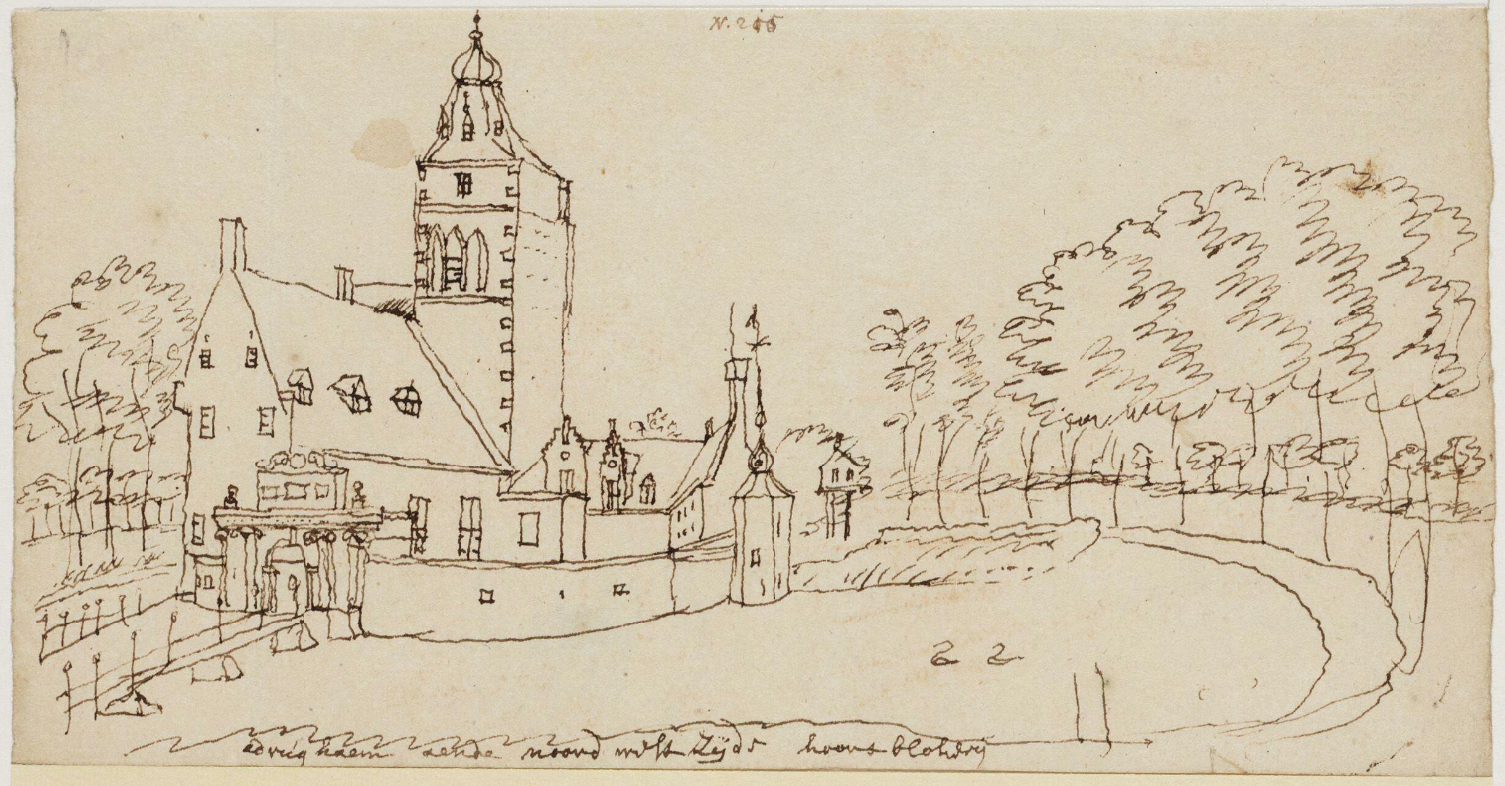
The castle around 1700

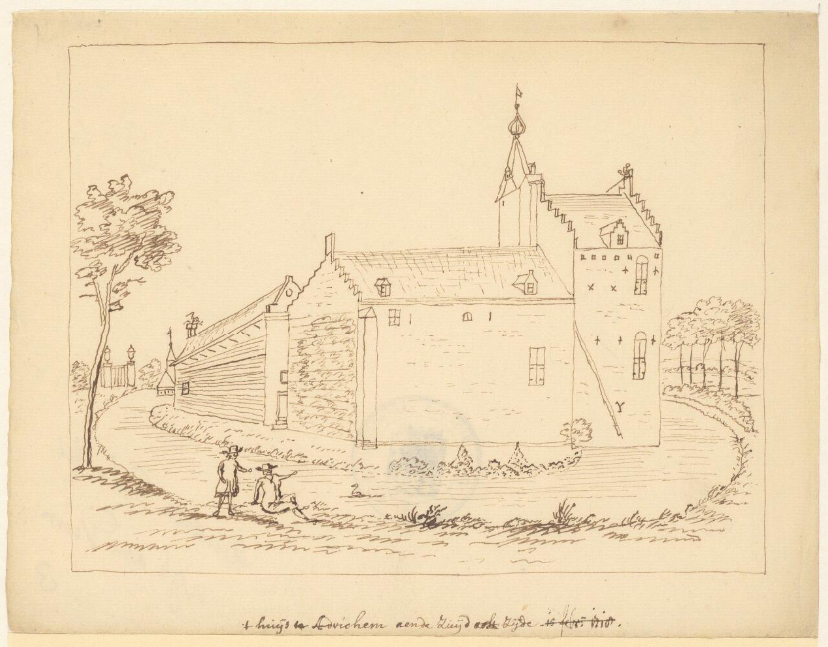
The rear of the castle around 1700

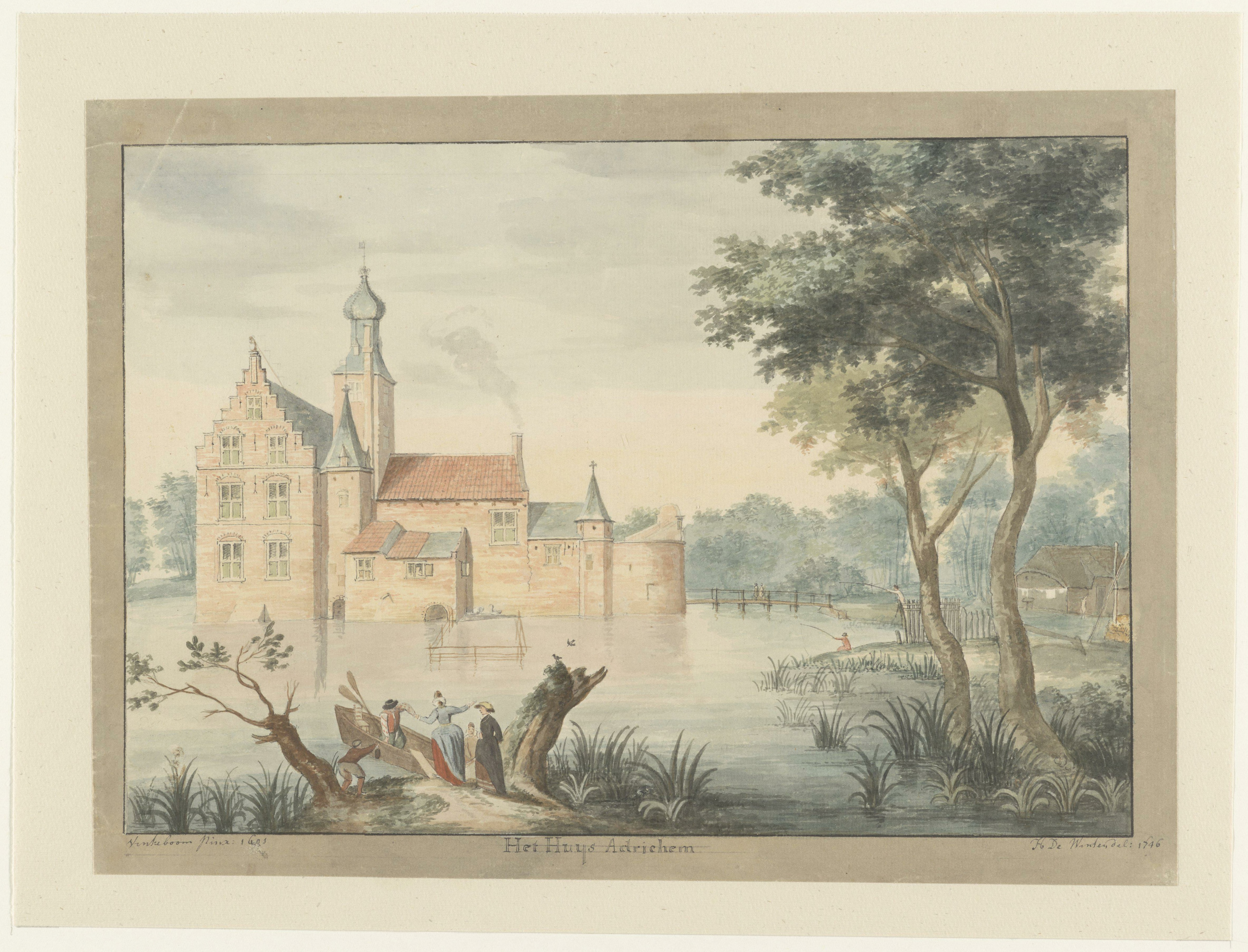
The castle in the 1740s

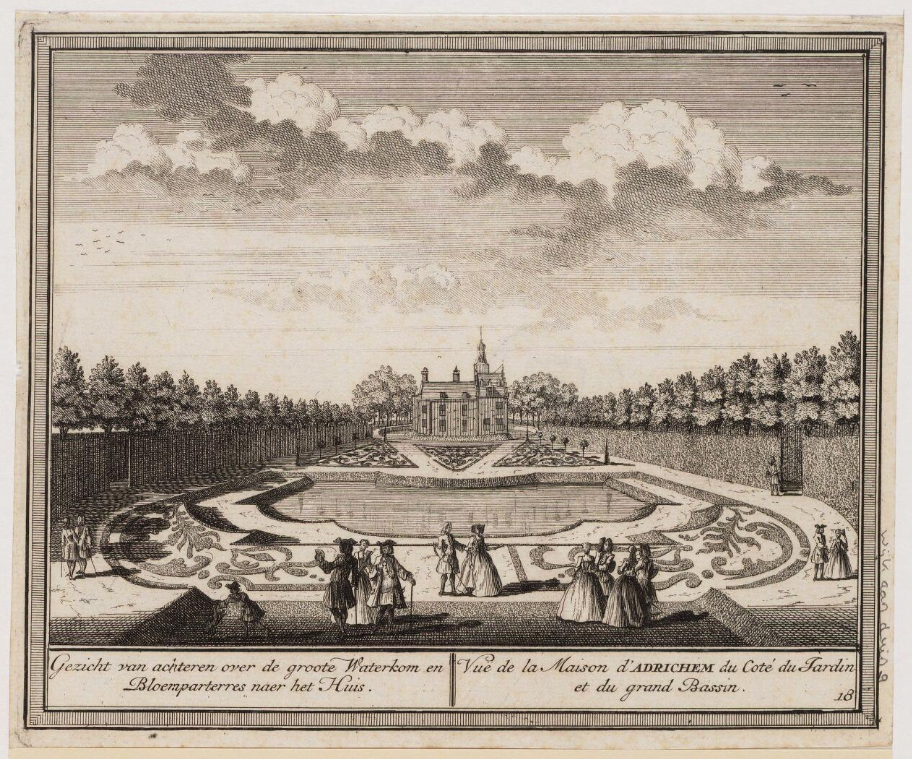
Zegepralend Kennemerland depicts the castle with its formal gardens

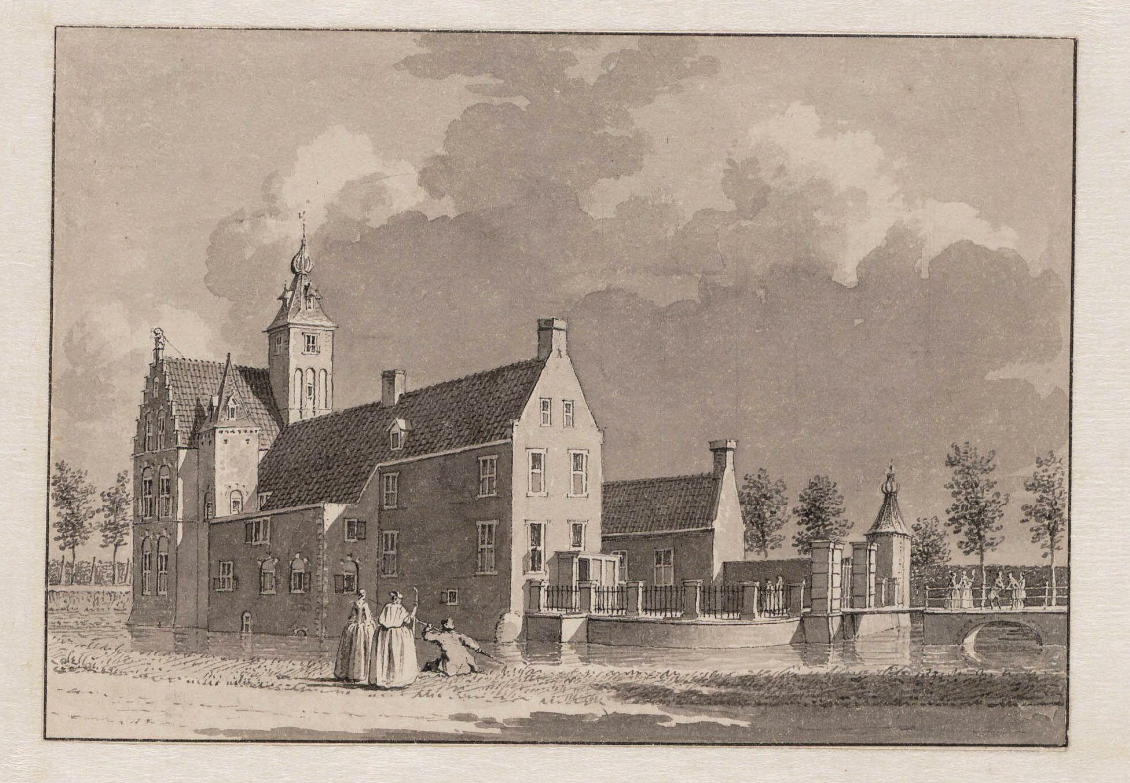
The castle by Cornelis Pronk (1753)

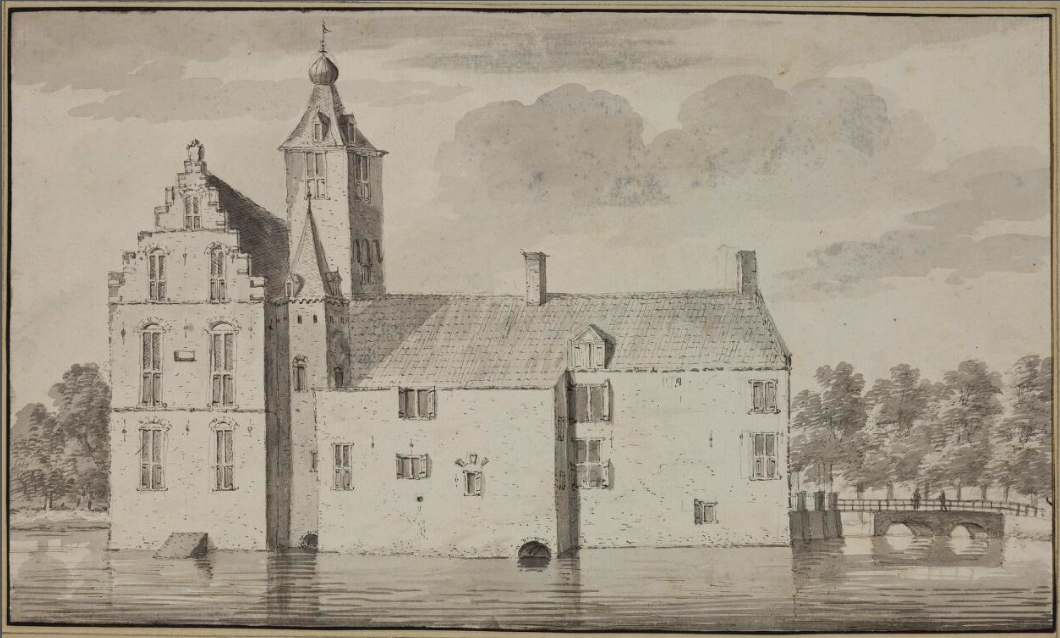
Another view by Cornelis Pronk (1753)

== Literature ==
- Butter, Jan (2023). De kastelenlinie Beverwijk Heemskerk (in Dutch). Wijk aan Zee: De Vrijstaat Roetz. pp. 22–32. ISBN 978-90-823527-9-5.
- Reinoud Rutte - Stedenatlas Jacob van Deventer; 226 stadsplattegronden uit 1545-1575 - schakels tussen verleden en heden, 2018 - page 342
- Christian Bertram - Noord-Hollands Arcadia; ruim 400 Noord-Hollandse buitenplaatsen in tekening, 2005 - pages 19–21
- Bert Koene - Midden-Kennemerland in de vroege en hoge middeleeuwen, 2003
- Roefstra, J., 2002: 'Op zoek naar Adrichem, Een onderzoek naar de oudste bewoningsgeschiedenis van kasteel Adrichem te Beverwijk', in: Hulst, M., Weber, E. '40 jaar amateurarcheologie in Beverwijk en Heemskerk', Beverwijk (Ledenbulletin HGMK 26), p. 71-75
- Roefstra, J., 2002: 'Van curtis tot kasteel', in: Hulst, M., Weber, E. '40 jaar amateurarcheologie in Beverwijk en Heemskerk', Beverwijk (Ledenbulletin HGMK 26), p. 24-34
- Roefstra, J., Wijk, D.R. van, 2001: 'Hoeve Adrichem', in: Blazer, W.H.C. 'Archeologische Kroniek 2000', Leiden (Holland 33ste Jaargang), p. 16-17
- Groesbeek, Johan Willem (1981). Middeleeuwse kastelen van Noord-Holland (in Dutch). Rijswijk: Elmar BV. pp. 105–113. ISBN 90-6120-2337.</
- J. van Venetiën - Hart van Kennemerland; album van leven en werken in Midden-Kennemerland door de eeuwen heen, 1968—page 149
- H.T. Colenbrander - Gijsbert Karel v Hogendorp op Adrichem, 1907—pages 305 - 330
