= Frans Adam van der Duyn van Maasdam =

Dutch officer and politician

Adam Frans Jules Armand, count van der Duyn van Maasdam
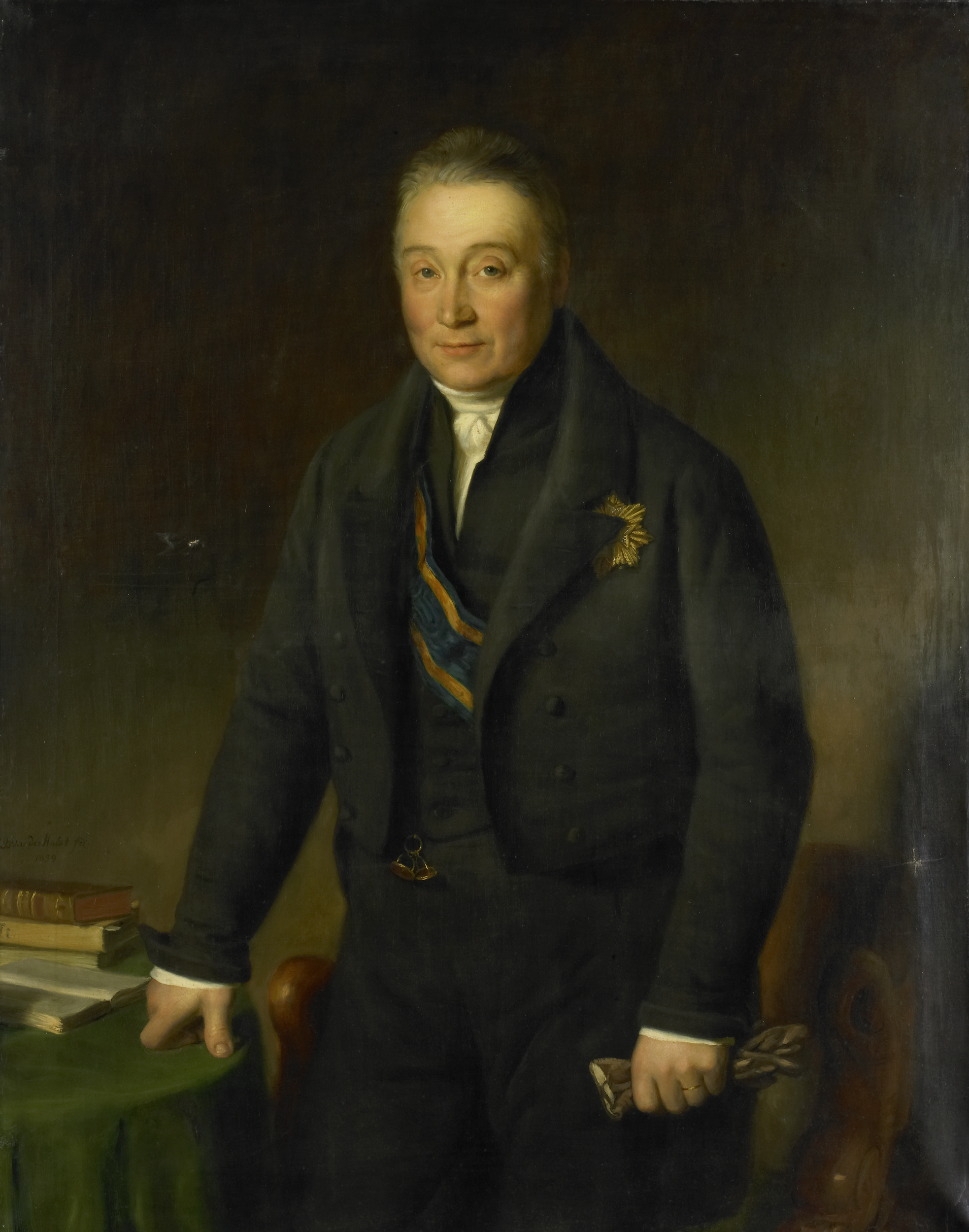

Member of the Provisional Government of the Netherlands
- In office November 1813 – December 1813
- Monarch: William Frederick

Personal details
- Born: Adam Frans Jules Armand van der Duyn van Maasdam; 13 April 1771 Deventer, Netherlands
- Died: 19 September 1848 (aged 77) The Hague, Netherlands
- Citizenship: Dutch
- Party: Orangism; Liberal conservative (no party)
- Spouse: Frederica Maria Isabella Benjamina van der Capellen (m. 1799, d. 1809)
- Children: 3 sons and 1 daughter
- Parent(s): Willem, Baron van der Duyn van 's-Gravenmoer en Maasdam lady Elizabeth Magdalena van Lijnden
- Education: Leiden University
- Occupation: Politician
- Profession: Officer; Squire

Adam Frans Jules Armand, Count van der Duyn, lord of Maasdam and 's-Gravenmoer (13 April 1771 – 19 September 1848) was a Dutch officer and politician. He was part of the Triumvirate of 1813 that invited Prince William Frederick of Orange-Nassau to become Sovereign Prince of the Netherlands. He was born in Deventer, Overijssel.

== Biography ==
He was a member of the Medieval noble family Van der Duyn (nl). He joined the army of the Dutch Republic as lieutenant, after completing his military education, in 1787. From 1789 till 1791 he studied Roman law at the University of Leiden. At the age of 20 he became Chamberlain of Prince William Frederick, the son of stadtholder William V. He belonged to the Orange party that opposed the more liberal Patriots who wanted to curtail the power of the stadtholder. However, Van de Duyn was quite enlightened and didn't belong to reactionary wing of the Orange party. After the French occupation of the Dutch Republic and the establishment of the Batavian Republic, he retired from public service and devoted himself to study. He rented the Castle of IJsselstein and lived there with his wife Maria Baroness van der Capellen, who he had married in 1799. They were a very happy young couple, but Maria died after ten years of marriage. Van der Duyn was fond of literature and had his own private library. He preferred to read the works of Diderot, Rousseau, Bayle, Belle van Zuylen and Goethe. He was influenced by the liberal ideas of his age. He preferred a Constitutional Monarchy and was opposed to tyranny. He did sympathize with some of the ideals of the French revolutionaries, but despised the radicalism of the Jacobins. He seldom left his castle and choose to live a quiet life.

In 1811 or 1812 Van der Duyn moved to The Hague. He joined the circle of conspirators around Gijsbert Karel van Hogendorp who were planning an uprising against the French occupators. In November 1813, when it came clear that Emperor Napoleon was losing the war against the Coalition, Van der Duyn, Van Hogendorp and Leopold van Limburg Stirum took power after an uprising which was planned carefully, and formed a Triumvirate that invited Prince William Frederick, the son of the last stadtholder, to come to the Netherlands and to accept the title of Sovereign Prince. On 30 November 1813 Prince William Frederick landed at Scheveningen. After the return of Prince William, a commission was set up to draft a Constitution. Van der Duyn was made a member of that commission that was headed by Van Hogendorp. In 1814 he was appointed a member of the Raad van State (Council of State). Besides that, he also became head of the Royal Household, and was appointed extraordinary ambassador to the English Court and was entrusted with the task of seeking the hand of Princess Charlotte for the Hereditary Prince of Orange, however the mission was unsuccessful.

As a nobleman (predicate: Jonkheer, squire), he was entitled to join the Ridderschap, the College of Knights, of South Holland. When Prince William Frederick accepted the throne as King William I, Van der Duyn was given the title Count.

From 1817 till 1844 Van der Duyn served as governor of South Holland. King William made him Marshal of the Court in 1825. He continued to serve as Marshal of the Court under William II, who succeeded his father in 1840. In 1840s he supported the revision of the Constitution. In 1848 the King appointed Van der Duyn a member of the Senate in order to secure a majority for the constitutional revisions. He died shortly afterwards on 19 December 1848 in The Hague. Van der Duyn was President of the Board of Trustees of Leiden University from 1813 until 14 August 1848.

Van der Duyn wrote an autobiographical memoir which was published in 1853.

== See also ==
- Triumvirate of 1813
- Gijsbert Karel van Hogendorp

Political offices
Preceded by Frédéric Auguste van Leyden van Westbarendrecht	Governor of South Holland; 1817-1844	Johan Adriaan ridder van der Heim van Duivendijke
