= Leopold Karel, Count of Limburg Stirum =

Count of Limburg Stirum, Member of the 1813 Dutch Triumvirate

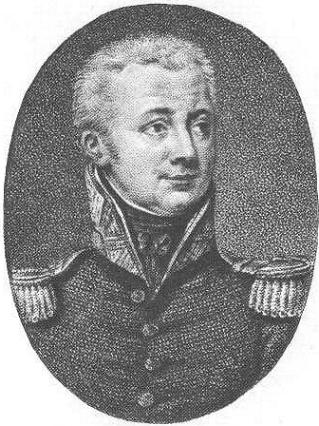
Leopold van Limburg Stirum

Leopold Count van Limburg Stirum (March 12, 1758 in Hoogeveen – June 25, 1840 in The Hague) was a politician who was part of the Triumvirate that took power in 1813 in order to re-establish the monarchy in the Netherlands.

== Career ==
Leopold was Captain in the 2nd Regiment Orange-Nassau.

During the French occupation, he was also the governor of The Hague. After the French troops, under the command of Charles-François Lebrun, 1st Duke of Plaisance, had fled the country, he took over the rule of the Netherlands, together with Gijsbert Karel van Hogendorp and Frans Adam van der Duyn van Maasdam. They were called the Triumvirate of 1813. In this temporary government, count Leopold was Minister of War and thus responsible for preventing anarchy and also making sure the Netherlands wouldn't be annexed to Prussia or England. The three statesmen invited the almost forgotten prince William VI of Orange, the later King William I, to The Hague to establish the monarchy. On November 30, 1813 Limburg Stirum welcomed the prince on the beach of Scheveningen and on December 6 the provisional government offered him the title of King. William refused, instead proclaiming himself "sovereign prince". He also wanted the rights of the people to be guaranteed by "a wise constitution". He became king William I of the Netherlands in 1815. He confirmed count Leopold as governor of The Hague and named him lieutenant general.

On the 8th of July 1815, Leopold van Limburg Stirum was named Knight Grand Cross in the Order of the Netherlands Lion, a title reserved for members of the Royal Family, foreign Heads of State and a select group of former prime ministers, Princes and Cardinals.

In 1828 he became general of the infantry.

From 1833 until his death, he was member of the Senate.

== Family ==
He first married in 1782 Theodora van der Does, Lady of Noordwijk (born 1758, died 1793). They had four children:

- Wilhelmina Frederica Sophia, countess van Limburg Stirum (born 1784, died 1870);
- Wigbold Albert Willem, count van Limburg Stirum Noordwijk, baron de l'Empire, (born in 's-Hertogenbosch 16 April 1786, died in The Hague 15 January 1855), member of the notabelenvergadering (1814), member of the Senate, Knight in the Order of the Netherlands Lion. He married in 1811 Maria Margareta Elisabeth, Baroness van Slingeland (born 1790, died 1834);
- Otto Jan Herbert, count van Limburg Stirum (born 1789, died 1851). He married (1st) in 1814 Josephine Arnoldine baroness Rengers (born 1789, died 1839); (2nd) in 1843 Sophia Augusta von Buchwald (born 1814, died 1890);
- Frederik Govert, count van Limburg Stirum (born 1790, k.a. Leipzig 1813). In 1801 he married Maria van Styrum (born 1763, died 1848). They had one daughter who died at the age of 5:
- Marie Johanna Leopoldine, countess van Limburg Stirum (born 1803, died 1808).
