= Champguyon =

- Commune
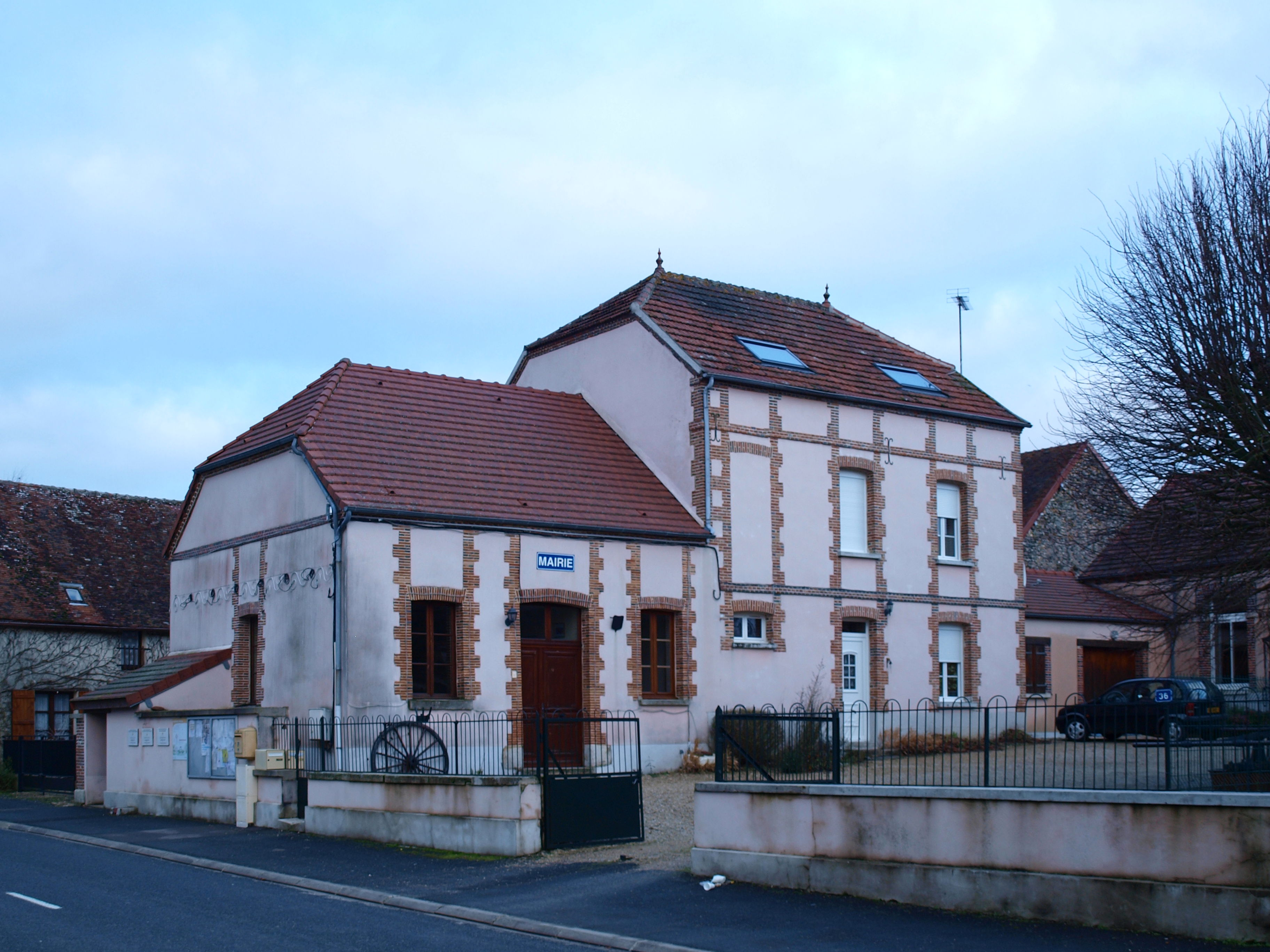
- The town hall in Champguyon

- Coat of arms
- Location of Champguyon
- Location within France Location within Grand Est
- Coordinates: 48°46′37″N 3°32′34″E
- Country: France
- Region: Grand Est
- Department: Marne
- Arrondissement: Épernay
- Canton: Sézanne-Brie et Champagne
- Intercommunality: Sézanne-Sud Ouest Marnais

Government
  - Mayor (2020–2026): José Lahaye
- Area^{1}: 16.63 km^{2} (6.42 sq mi)
- Elevation: 200 m (660 ft)
- Population (2023): 298
  - Density: 17.9/km^{2} (46.4/sq mi)
- Time zone: UTC+01:00 (CET)
  - Summer (DST): UTC+02:00 (CEST)
- INSEE/Postal code: 51116 /51310
- ^{1} French Land Register data, which excludes lakes, ponds, glaciers > 1 km^{2} (0.386 sq mi or 247 acres) and river estuaries.

Champguyon (French pronunciation: [ʃɑ̃ɡɥijɔ̃]) is a commune in the Marne department, Grand Est region, in north-eastern France. The commune has an area of 16.63 km^{2} and its altitude ranges from 159 to 214 meters. The nearest larger towns are Esternay (4 km to the south) and Sézanne (14 km to the southeast). As of 2019, there were 146 dwellings in Champguyon, of which 109 main residences.

== Population ==
Historical population
Year	Pop.	±% p.a.
1968	186	—
1975	165	−1.70%
1982	175	+0.84%
1990	188	+0.90%
1999	212	+1.34%
2007	243	+1.72%
2012	269	+2.05%
2017	274	+0.37%
2023	298	+1.41%
Source: INSEE

== See also ==
- Communes of the Marne department
