= Triumvirate of 1813 =

Short-lived Netherlands provisional government

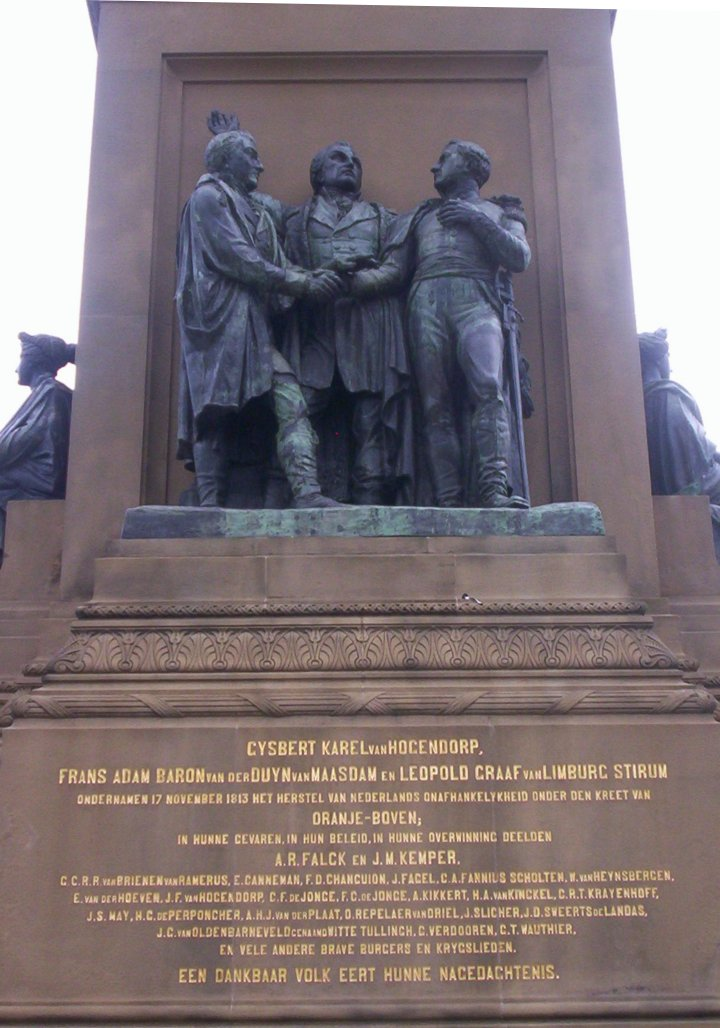
Gijsbert Karel van Hogendorp, Frans Adam van der Duyn van Maasdam and Leopold of Limburg Stirum on the monument at Plein 1813 (1813 Square) in The Hague

The Triumvirate of 1813 (Driemanschap van 1813), or the Provisional Government, governed the Netherlands briefly at the end of the Napoleonic era, before Prince William Frederick, the future King William I, came to power. It consisted of Gijsbert Karel van Hogendorp, Frans Adam van der Duyn van Maasdam and Leopold van Limburg Stirum.

== History ==
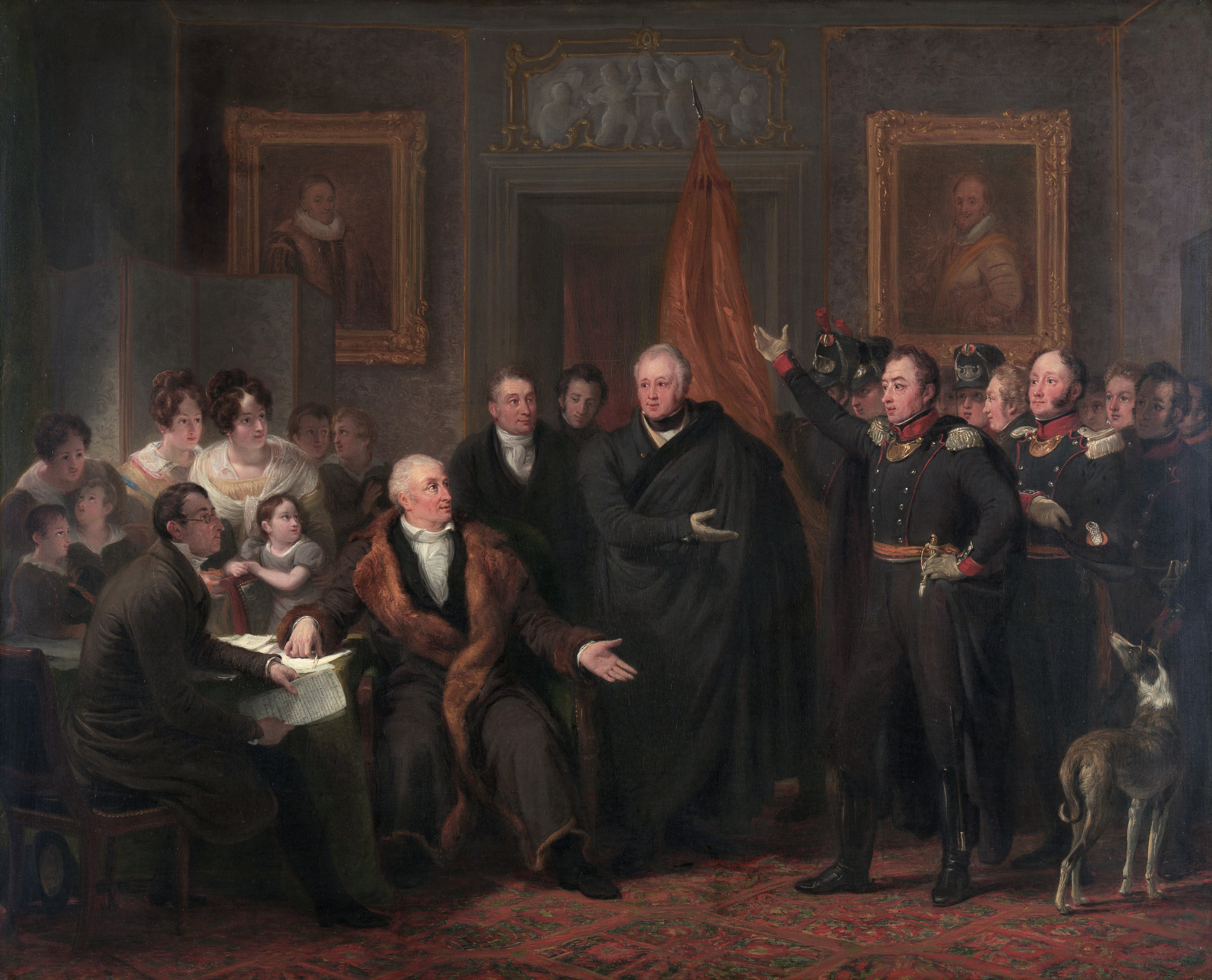
The Triumvirate Assuming Power on Behalf of the Prince of Orange by Jan Willem Pieneman, 1828.

The Triumvirate of 1813 was formed on 17 November 1813, after the French governor Charles-François Lebrun and a significant part of the French troops hurriedly left the area of the Dutch departments, which later became the Netherlands, leaving it without a government. The withdrawal of French forces was the result of Napoleon's disastrous campaign against Russia, his defeat at the Battle of Leipzig (also called the Battle of the Nations) and the subsequent push back of French forces into France by the forces of the Sixth Coalition.

This Triumvirate issued a proclamation in The Hague on 20 November 1813 in which it took charge of the general government and declared that the Netherlands was free from French rule. The next day a proclamation followed in which a Sovereign Principality of the United Netherlands was proclaimed, with the announcement that there was a General Government of the United Netherlands, in the name of the Prince of Orange, and that all compatriots were released from their oath of allegiance to the French Emperor.

On 21 November, Reinhard Falck was appointed general secretary of the Provisional Government. Before he arrived from Amsterdam on November 29, François Daniël Changuion served as general secretary.

The three statesmen invited by letter the almost forgotten Prince William Frederick of Orange-Nassau, son of the last stadholder, William V, Prince of Orange, to come to The Hague and take over the government as "sovereign prince". The purpose of this was to prevent anarchy, or a possible annexation of the Netherlands by Prussia or England. The Triumvirate knew that William Frederick would have to head any new government, and believed it would be better in the long term to restore him themselves rather than have him imposed by the Powers.

William Frederick accepted the invitation of the Triumvirate and a British frigate took him to the coast of Scheveningen where he set foot on Dutch soil on 30 November 1813. On 1 December, William Frederick was proclaimed sovereign prince, which he accepted on 2 December 1813. Four days later, on 6 December 1813, with the Triumvirate having completed its objective, William Frederick dissolved it and took over the government of the country. International recognition of William Frederick as monarch and the first King of the Netherlands only came about at the Congress of Vienna in 1815.
