= Gijsbert Karel van Hogendorp =

Dutch politician (1762–1843)

His Excellency Gijsbert Karel, Count van Hogendorp
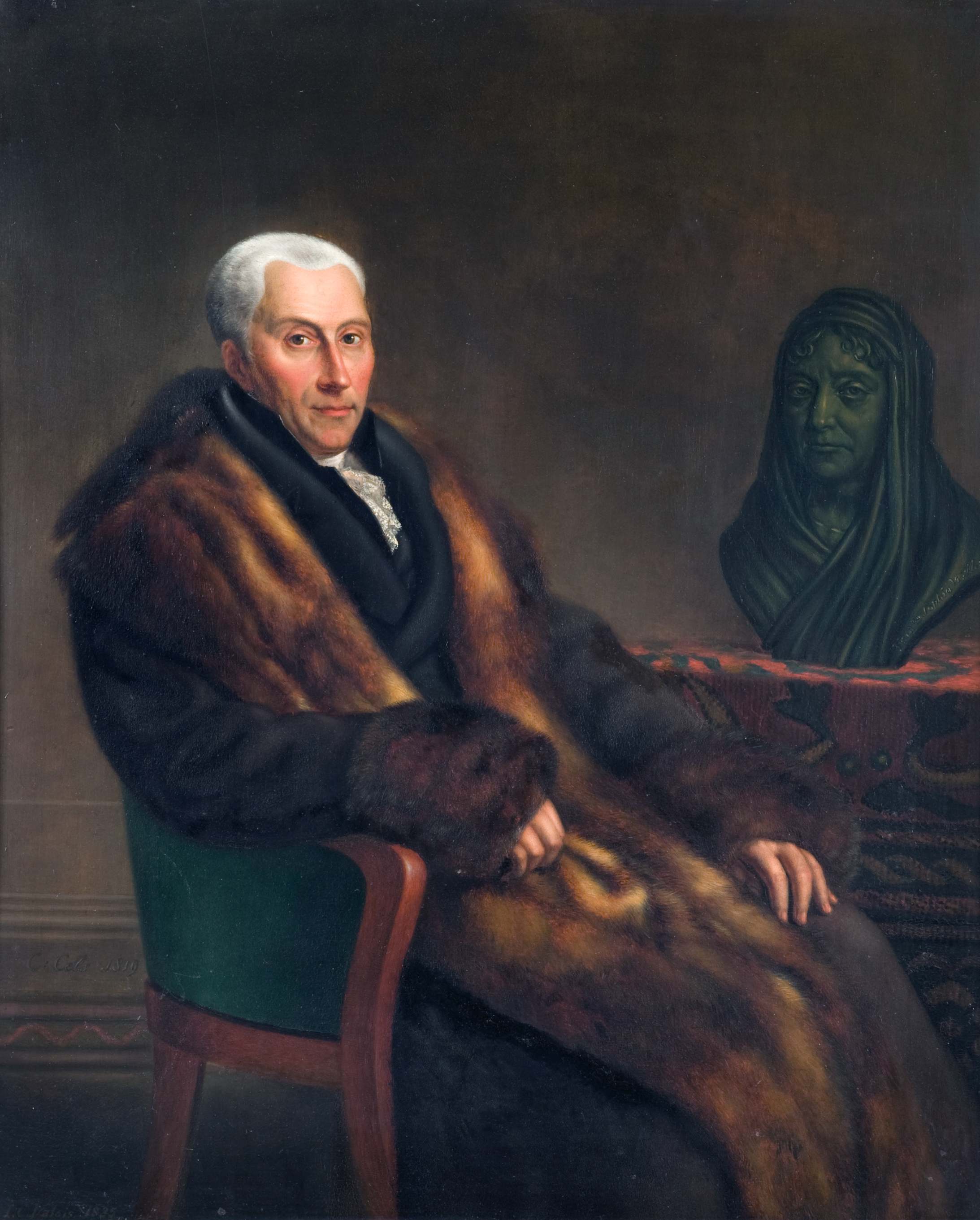

Member of the Provisional Government of the Netherlands
- In office November 1813 – December 1813
- Monarch: Prince William Frederick of Orange Nassau

Personal details
- Born: Gijsbert Karel van Hogendorp; 27 October 1762 Rotterdam, Netherlands
- Died: 5 August 1834 (aged 71) The Hague, Netherlands
- Party: Orangism; Liberal conservative Free trade liberal Monarchism (no party)
- Spouse: Hester Clifford (m. 1789; died 1823)
- Children: 10
- Education: Leiden University

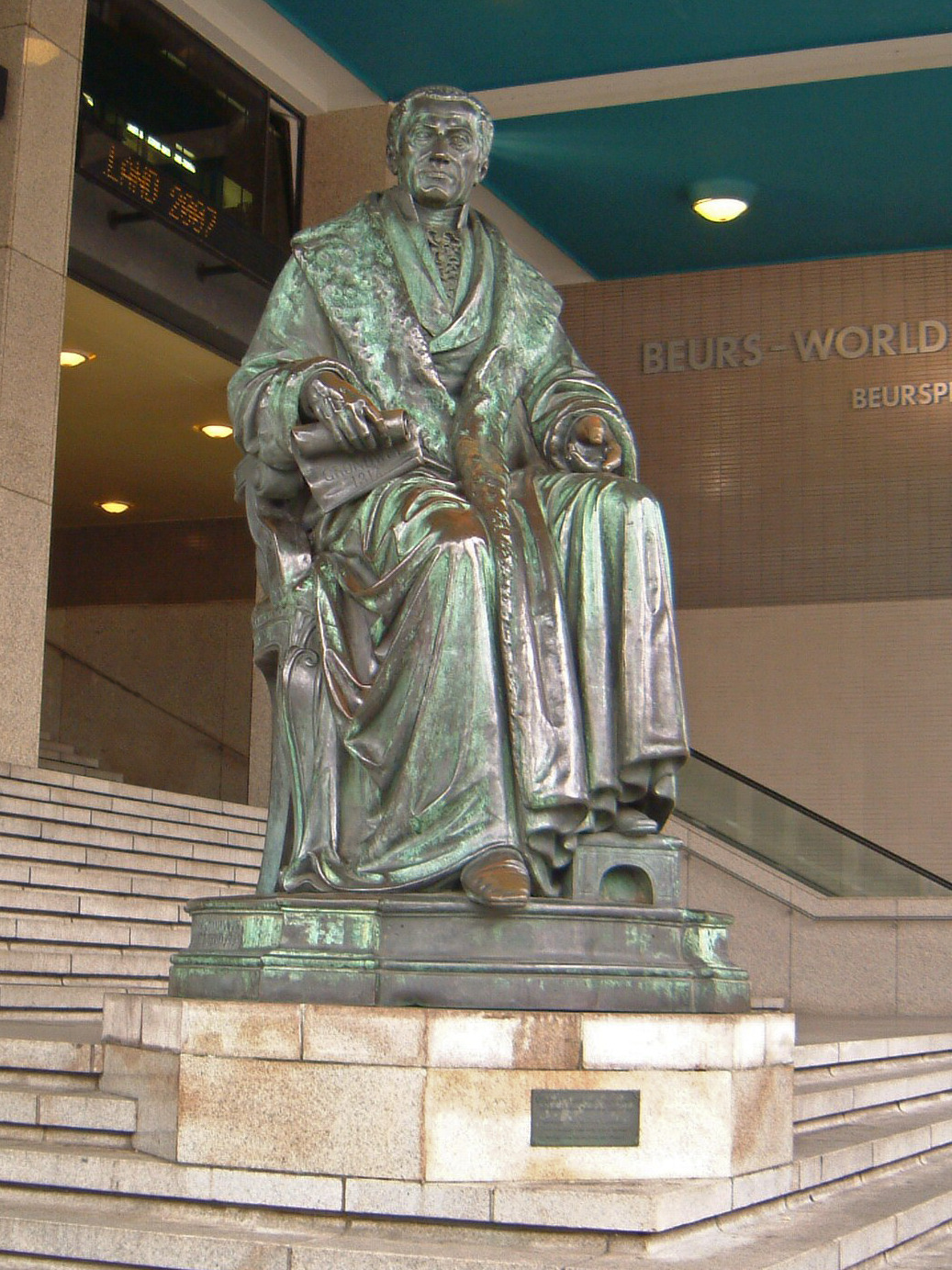
Gijsbert Karel van Hogendorp in front of the Beurs-WTC building in Rotterdam.

Gijsbert Karel, Count van Hogendorp (27 October 1762 – 5 August 1834) was a liberal conservative and liberal Dutch statesman. He was the brother of Dirk van Hogendorp the elder and the father of Dirk van Hogendorp the younger.

== Early life and education ==
Gijsbert Karel van Hogendorp was born in Rotterdam into a regent family. A few years after his birth, his father Willem left for the Dutch East Indies in search of riches, but he would never return, as his ship sank on the way back. Wilhelmina of Prussia, Princess of Orange, consort to the Stadtholder William V, concerned herself with the fate of the young Gijsbert and his older brother Dirk, and arranged an education for them at the cadet corps in Berlin. He graduated as an officer but did not particularly like his new job in the Prussian military. He later became a page to Prince Henry of Prussia. During his stay in Berlin befriended the enlightened Dr Johann Erich Biester, a scholar and undersecretary at Prussian ministry of Cult who later became head of the Royal Library. Bister taught him English, Latin and Greek and together they read classical and modern literature. He returned to Holland in 1781 at the request of his mother to serve in the army of William V. He became quite close to the stadtholder, but especially to his wife, princess Wilhelmina, the sister of the King of Prussia.

In 1783, Van Hogendorp travelled to United States of America. He accompanied Pieter Johan van Berckel, who had been appointed the first emissary to the young republic. During this trip, he met Thomas Jefferson, who had a favourable impression of the young Van Hogendorp. (Afterwards he frequently corresponded with Jefferson.) He was also invited by George Washington at Mount Vernon, but was disappointed when Mr. and Mrs. Washington showed no interest in his person and ideas. During his stay in the US he made a study of its constitution, which he admired very much. On his return to the Dutch Republic he briefly visited London to get acquainted with the parliamentary system of government. In 1785 he attended Leiden University, where he majored in law.

== Orangist ==
He belonged to the moderate wing of the Orangist party and he personally advocated some reforms, including the introduction of a constitution. He opposed the Patriots, who wanted revolutionary reforms and the degradation of the stadtholder to a figurehead. The Patriots dominated the provinces of Holland and Utrecht, the most prosperous of the seven provinces of the Dutch Republic. The stadtholder was forced to leave The Hague and lived most of the time in Nijmegen, in Gelderland. Prussia invaded the Dutch Republic in 1787 to restore the power of the stadtholder. The Patriots were prosecuted, some of them were able to leave the Republic and went to France. Van Hogendorp, who played an important role in the restoration of the ancien régime, was elected pensionaris – main legal advisor and advocate – of Rotterdam from 1788 to 1795, only to be dismissed after the French occupation and the establishment of the Batavian Republic.

Van Hogendorp refused to collaborate with the new regime and stayed out of politics for the next 18 years. He did not change his mind when some of his old colleagues from the Orangist party went to serve Louis Napoleon when he ascended the throne of the Kingdom of Holland in 1806. In 1810 Holland became a province of the French Empire of Napoleon I. Gijsbert Karel van Hogendorp's older brother, Dirk van Hogendorp, who admired the French Emperor, joined the Imperial Army with the rank of General. Napoleon later bestowed him with the title of Comte de l'Empire (Count of the Empire). Gijsbert Karel did not hold the Emperor in high esteem. In his eyes the Emperor was nothing more than a Dictator and a brute.

During the French occupation Gijsbert Karel van Hogendorp and his wife, Hester Clifford, lived at Adrichem manor house for a while. In 1809 he moved to The Hague where he remained till the end of his life.

In 1812 Van Hogendorp became convinced that the French Empire would collapse in a few years and drafted a paper, a precursor of the Constitution of 1814. He played a decisive role during the revolt of October and November 1813 that restored the Dutch independence.

== Career ==
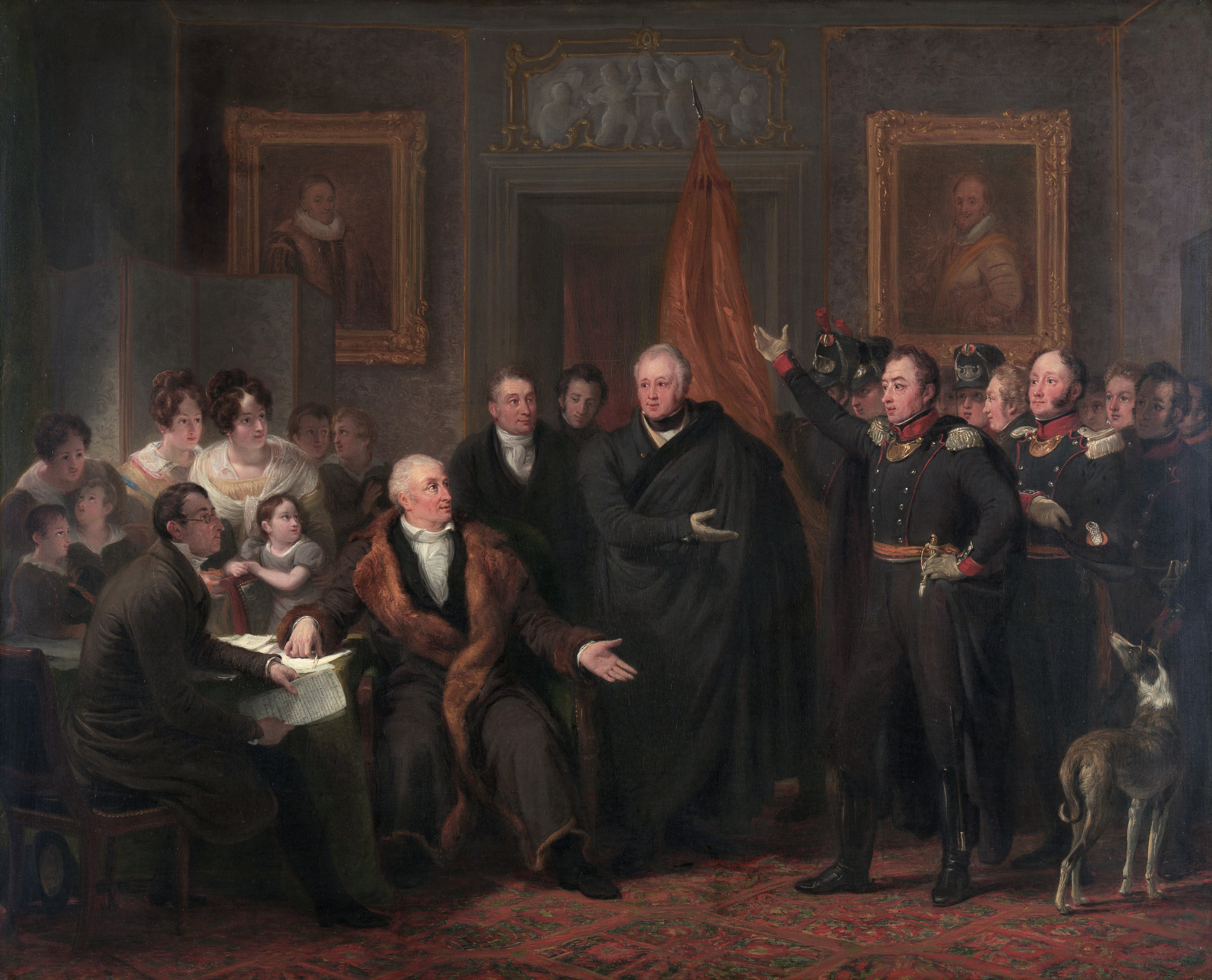
The Triumvirate Assuming Power on Behalf of the Prince of Orange by Jan Willem Pieneman, 1828. Members of Triumvirate: Gijsbert Karel van Hogendorp (sitting, left), Adam Count van der Duyn van Maasdam (standing, first from the left) and Leopold Count van Limburg Stirum (in the centre, wearing a gown)

He was part of the Triumvirate of 1813 that invited William Frederick, the eldest son of William V (who died in exile) to become Prince of the new independent Netherlands in late 1813. He served as Foreign Minister from 7 December 1813 to 6 April 1814, and headed the commission that wrote the Constitution of the Netherlands of 1814. On 6 April 1814 he was named the first Vice-President of the Council of State, making him the second most important person in the Netherlands. In 1815 the Netherlands became a Kingdom. Prince William accepted the throne as King William I. Belgium was later added to the Netherlands. The new King was too authoritarian to the taste of Van Hogendorp and the two men became enemies. Van Hogendorp constantly had to remind the King that he was a Constitutional, and not an absolute King. The relation between King and Vice-President became unworkable when Van Hogendorp criticised the King's protectionist policy. Van Hogendorp preferred free trade instead of protectionism. In 1816 Van Hogendorp asked to be relieved from his position of Vice-President of the Council of State. He was relieved on 7 November of that year and was named a member of the Eerste Kamer der Staten-Generaal, the Senate. As an MP he belonged to the moderate and liberal opposition to the King. In 1819 Van Hogendorp was dismissed as a member of the Council of State by the King.

In 1830 he urged the government to listen to the grieves of the Belgium people in order to keep the Belgians within the Kingdom. He showed some sympathy with the Belgians when they seceded from the Netherlands in 1831.

Gijsbert Karel van Hogendorp, who suffered from gout since his early fifties – he was bed stricken very often – died at the age of 71 years old at his house in The Hague.

== Personal life ==
Gijsbert Karel van Hogendorp was married to Hester Clifford (1766–1826), the daughter of an extremely wealthy merchant family from Amsterdam. They had ten children. When Gijsbert Karel died in 1834, six of his children were still alive. Actually, two of them still lived at the family home in The Hague.

On 20 September 1815 he was ennobled and became the first Count Van Hogendorp. When he died, his title passed to his eldest son Willem.

Through his wife, he inherited Adrichem Castle in Beverwijk, which they used as their summer retreat until 1808, when they moved to The Hague.

=== Religious ideas ===
Van Hogendorp belonged to the Dutch Reformed Church. In his younger years he was not very much impressed by religion (he only showed interest in moral aspects of the Mosaic Law), but later on – when he was still a young man – he became a practising Christian. He was a typical middle-of-the-road Christian: he disliked the ultra orthodoxy as much as religious liberalism. He religious views could be described as quite enlightened. He was opposed to the religious and political opinions of the poet Willem Bilderdijk (his son Dirk on the other hand admired Bilderdijk very much) and preferred theologians like Prof Johannes van der Palm of the University of Leiden. Van der Palm was a keen (although quite conservative) supporter of textual criticism but dismissed higher criticism. Van Hogendorp preferred to read Van der Palm's (highly conservative) reconstruction of the text of the New Testament.

When he was suffering from gout and unable to attend Church on Sunday, he used to read devotional literature.

=== His brother Dirk ===
His older brother, Dirk van Hogendorp (1761-1822), a military, was a General in the army of Napoleon and governor of Eastern Prussia. After Napoleon's escape from Elba and subsequent return to France, Dirk immediately sided with the Emperor. Napoleon named him governor of Nantes during his last hundred days in power. After the defeat of the Emperor, Dirk moved to Brazil and became a landowner.

=== Other relatives ===
He was the great-great-great-grandfather of Audrey Hepburn.

== Trivia ==
- When he was unable to sell his country estate at Adrichem, he ordered the demolition of the manor house in 1809.
- He was a self-declared Liberal. (To today's standards he would be a Liberal conservative.)
- He was very pro-British and a staunch supporter of Free trade.
- Van Hogendorp spoke several languages. He was fluent in English, French, Dutch, Latin and Greek. French was his mother tongue. He preferred English literature.
- He was a member of the Dutch Reformed Church and belonged to its more moderate wing. He used to read the New Testament in Greek. During his later years he made use of the Bible commentaries of Prof Dr Johannes van der Palm, a former Patriot.
- The Dutch conservative liberal party, VVD, considers Van Hogendorp as a liberal thinker, a precursor of Thorbecke.

Political offices
Preceded by Herman Nederburgh	Pensionary of Rotterdam; 1787–1795	Position abolished
New title	Secretary of State for Foreign Affairs; 1813–1814	Succeeded by Baron van Nagell
New title	Vice-President of the Council of State; 1814–1816	Succeeded by Baron Mollerus
Dutch nobility
New creation	Count van Hogendorp; 1815–1834	Succeeded by Willem van Hogendorp
