= 1824 in art =

Events in the year 1824 in art.

== Events ==
- April 2 – The British government buys John Julius Angerstein's art collection for £60,000 for the purpose of establishing a National Gallery in London which opens to the public in his former townhouse on May 10.
- May 3 – The Royal Academy Exhibition of 1824 opens at Somerset House in London.
- August 25 – The Salon of 1824 opens at the Louvre in Paris. It is noted for the inclusion of British artists. The Hay Wain by John Constable is one of three of the artist's paintings exhibited and wins a gold medal.
- unknown dates
  - Caspar David Friedrich enters a depressive episode.
  - Edwin Landseer visits Scotland for the first time to paint a portrait of Sir Walter Scott; he will return annually, concentrating on animal portraits.
- A National Gallery of Naval Art is created in the Painted Hall of Greenwich Hospital, London.

== Works ==
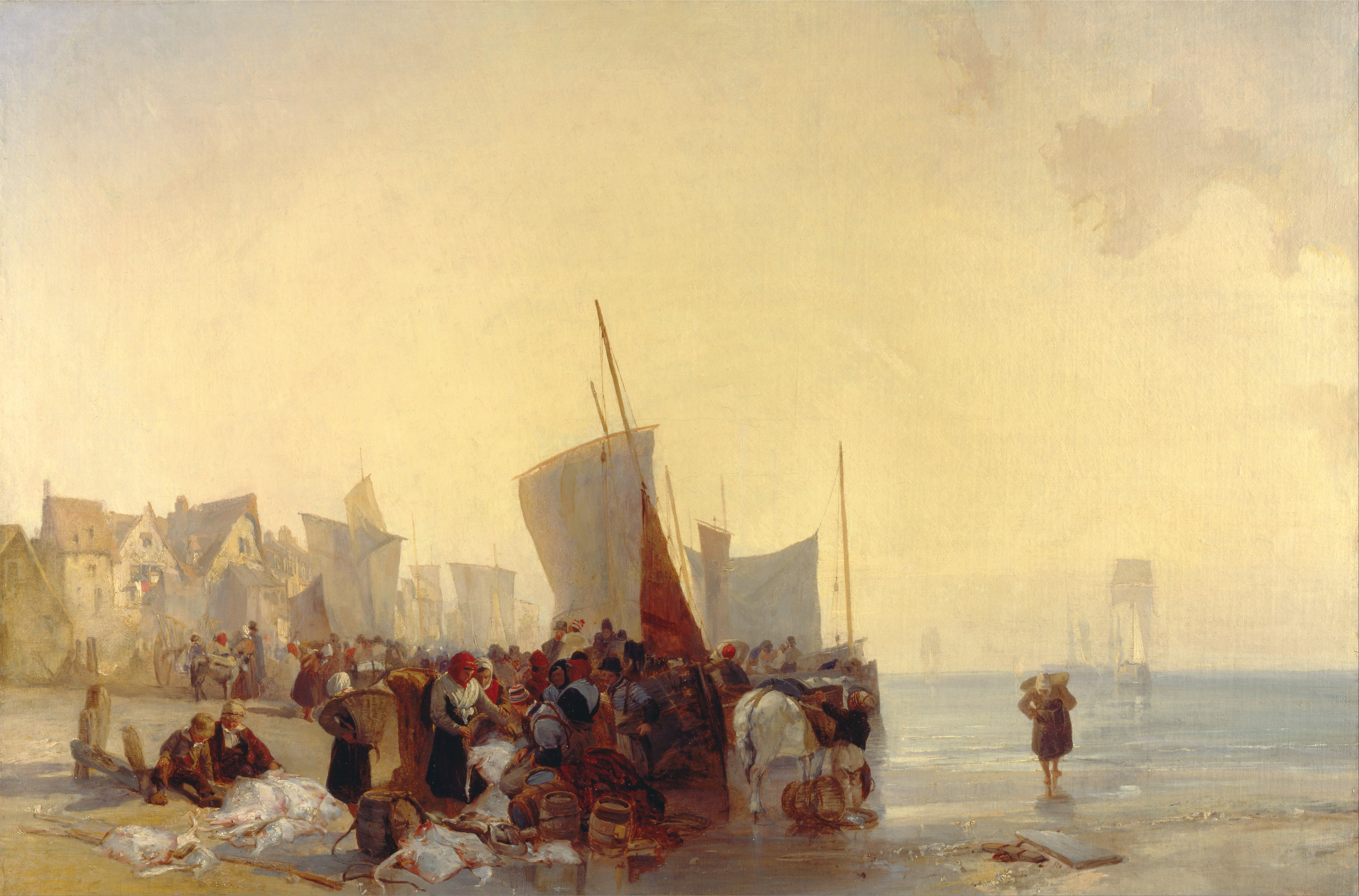
A Fishmarket near Boulogne by Richard Parkes Bonington

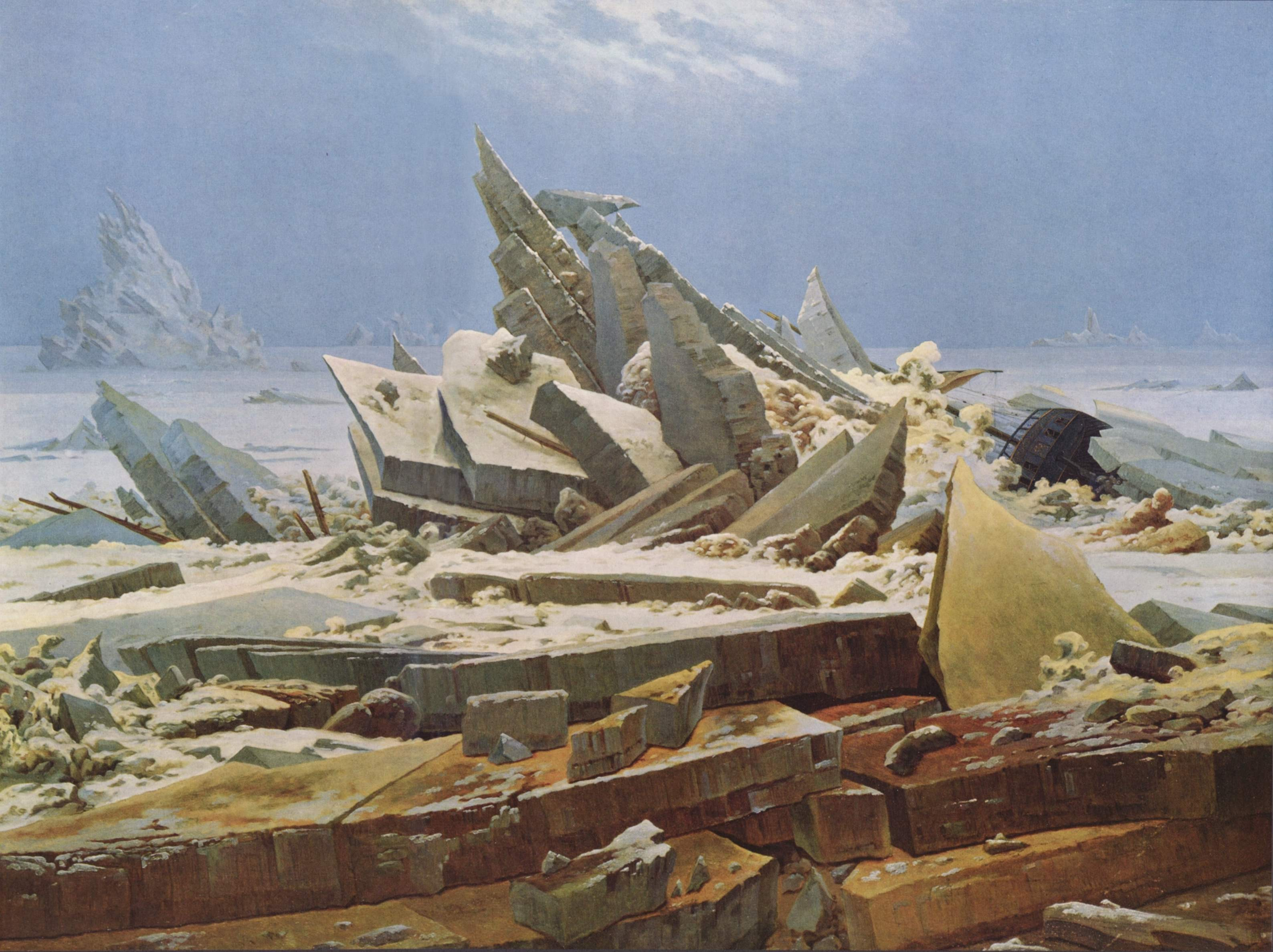
Caspar David Friedrich – The Sea of Ice

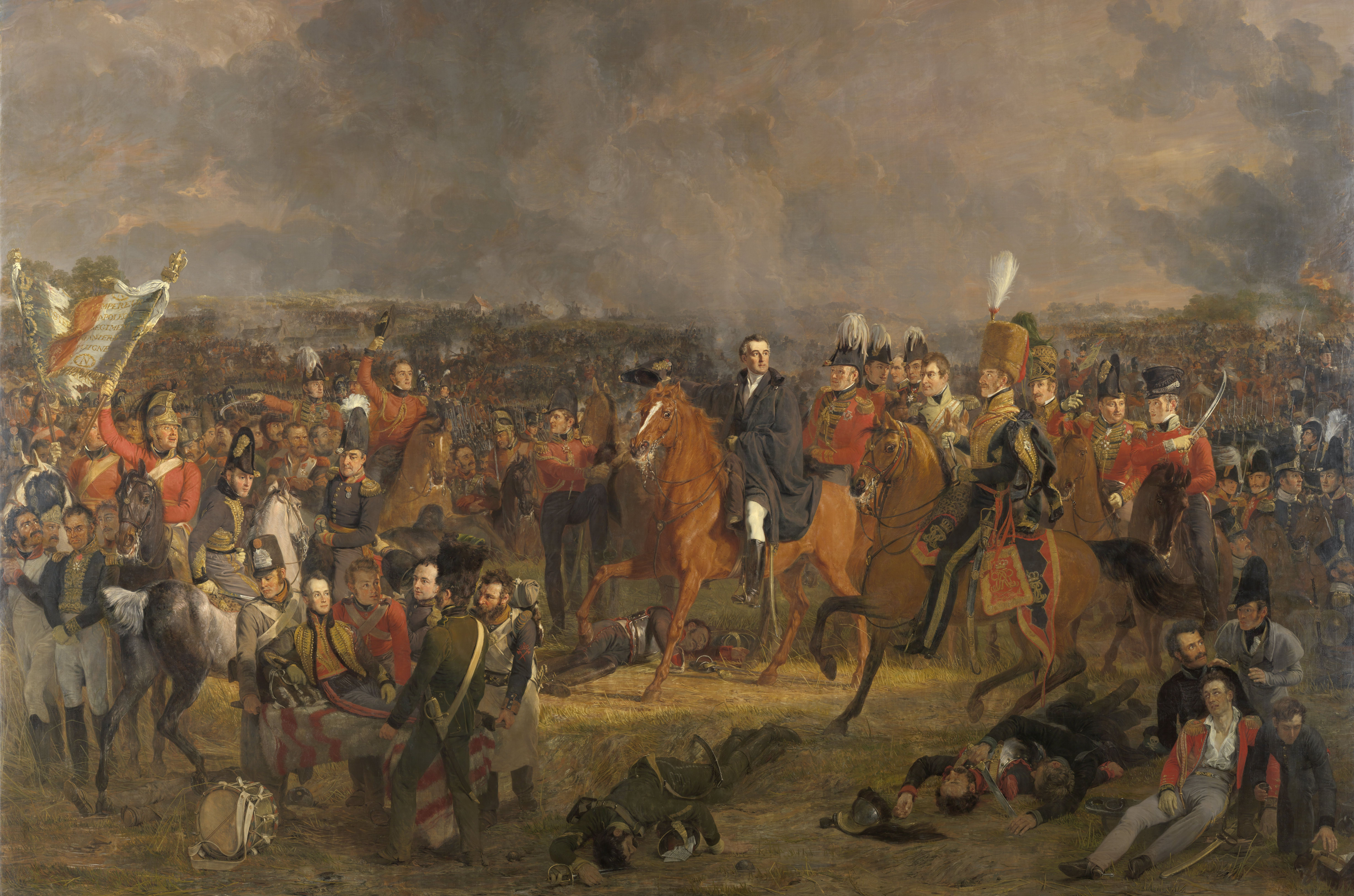
The Battle of Waterloo by Jan Willem Pieneman.

- Richard Parkes Bonington
  - A Distant View of St-Omer
  - A Fishmarket near Boulogne
  - French Coast with Fisherman
  - Ruins of the Abbey Saint Bertin
- François Joseph Bosio – Statue of Henry IV of France as a child (Louvre)
- Henry Perronet Briggs – Colonel Blood Stealing the Crown Jewels
- William Collins – The Cherry Seller
- Samuel Colman – St James's Fair
- Léon Cogniet – Marius among the Ruins of Carthage
- Louis Daguerre – The Ruins of Holyrood Chapel (approx. date)
- Francis Danby – Sunset at Sea after a Storm
- Jacques-Louis David
  - Mars Being Disarmed by Venus
  - Portrait of Juliette de Villeneuve
- Eugène Delacroix
  - The Massacre at Chios
  - Orphan Girl at the Cemetery (c. 1823 or 1824)
- Peter De Wint – Lincoln from the South
- Charles Lock Eastlake – The Champion
- Caspar David Friedrich – The Sea of Ice
- François Gérard – Daphnis and Chloe
- Antoine-Jean Gros – Portrait of Jean-Antoine Chaptal
- Jean Auguste Dominique Ingres – The Vow of Louis XIII
- Alexander Andreyevich Ivanov
  - Cleansing of the Temple
  - Transfiguration
- George Jones – Sir John Leicester and the Cheshire Yeomanry Exercising on the Sands at Liverpool
- Jan Adam Kruseman – The Great Belzoni
- Thomas Lawrence
  - Portrait of the Duke of Devonshire
  - Portrait of Frederick Robinson
  - Portrait of Princess Sophia
- Edwin Landseer – Lion, a Newfoundland Dog
- Élisabeth Vigée Le Brun – Portrait of the Duchess of Berry
- Charles Robert Leslie – Sancho Panza and the Duchess
- Alexandre Menjaud – The Death of the Duke of Berry
- Alexander Nasmyth – High Street and the Lawn Market, Edinburgh
- Johann Friedrich Overbeck – Christ's Entry into Jerusalem
- Henry William Pickersgill – The Oriental Love Letter
- Jan Willem Pieneman – The Battle of Waterloo
- Edward Villiers Rippingille – The Stage Coach Breakfast
- John Trumbull – General George Washington Resigning His Commission
- J. M. W. Turner – The Battle of Trafalgar
- Horace Vernet
  - Conrad the Corsair
  - Duck Shooting
  - The Battle of Hanau
  - Portrait of the Duke of Angoulême
- David Wilkie –
  - The Cottage Toilette
  - The Sportsman
- William Frederick Witherington – A Modern Picture Gallery

== Awards ==
- Grand Prix de Rome, painting:
- Grand Prix de Rome, sculpture: Charles Seurre, sculptor.
- Grand Prix de Rome, architecture: Henri Labrouste.
- Grand Prix de Rome, engraving:
- Grand Prix de Rome, music: Auguste Barbereau.

== Births ==
- January 27 – Jozef Israëls, Dutch painter (died 1911)
- March 31 – William Morris Hunt, American painter (died 1879)
- May 11 – Jean-Léon Gérôme, French painter and sculptor (died 1904)
- June 12 – Albert-Ernest Carrier-Belleuse, French sculptor and painter (died 1887)
- July 12 – Eugène Boudin, French painter (died 1898)
- August 26 – Martha Darley Mutrie, British painter (died 1885)
- October 14 – Adolphe Joseph Thomas Monticelli, French painter (died 1886)
- October 30 – Christen Dalsgaard, Danish genre painter (died 1907)
- December 6 – Emmanuel Frémiet, French sculptor (died 1910)
- December 10 – Aasta Hansteen, Norwegian painter, writer and early feminist (died 1908)
- December 14 – Pierre Puvis de Chavannes, French painter (died 1898)

== Deaths ==
- January 26 – Théodore Géricault, French painter and lithographer, pioneer of the Romantic movement (born 1791)
- January 28 – George Mills, British sculptor, engraver and medallist (born 1792/1793)
- April 17 – William Ashford, British landscape painter working exclusively in Ireland (born 1746)
- May 28 – Joseph Reinhart, Swiss painter and draftsman (born 1749)
- September 12 – Louis Albert Guislain Bacler d'Albe, French artist, map-maker and close strategic advisor of Napoleon (born 1761)
- November 23 – Fyodor Alekseyev, Russian painter of landscape art (born 1753)
- December 9 – Anne-Louis Girodet de Roussy-Trioson, French painter (born 1767)
- December 24
  - John Downman, English portrait painter (born 1750)
  - Antoine Vestier, French miniaturist and painter of portraits (born 1740)
- date unknown
  - François-Anne David, French line-engraver (born 1741)
  - Thomas Hickey, Irish painter of portraits and genre scenes (born 1741)
