= Sir John Leicester and the Cheshire Yeomanry Exercising on the Sands at Liverpool =

1824 painting by George Jones

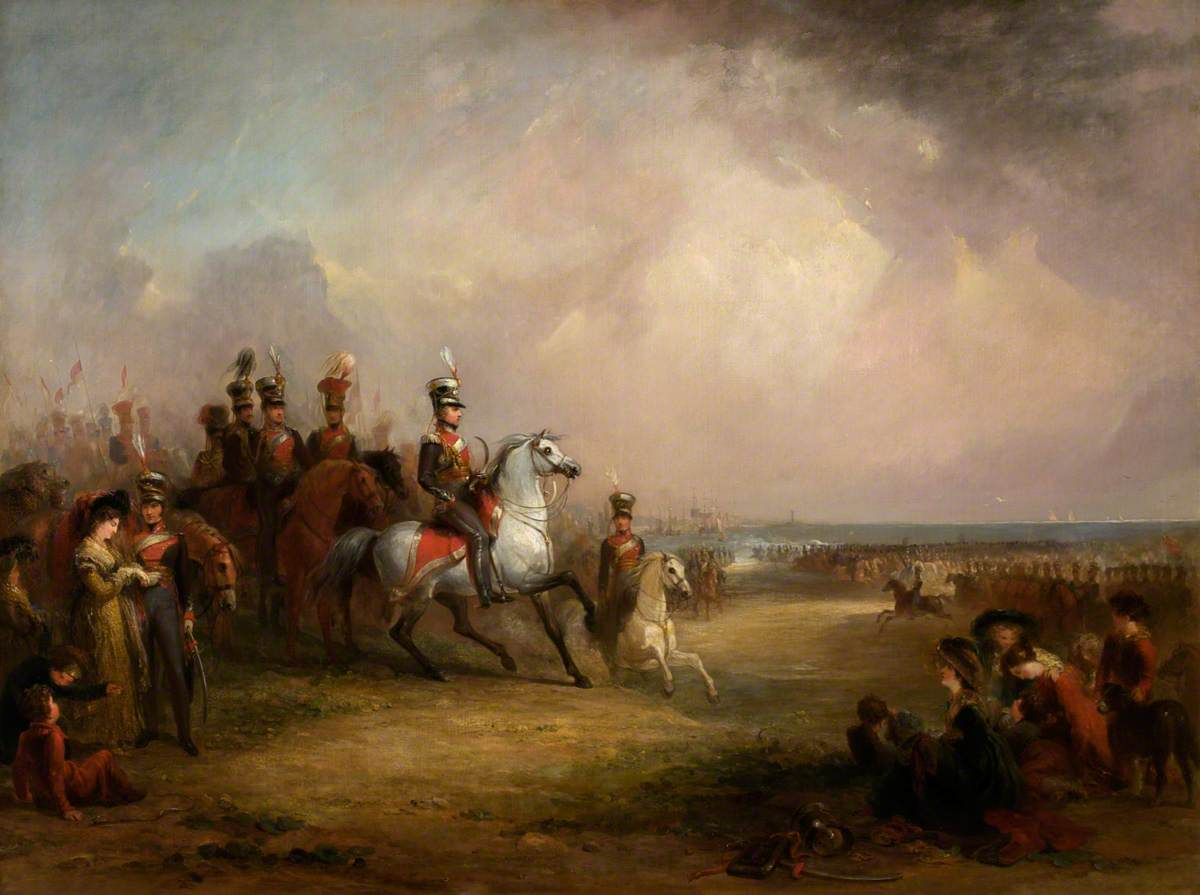
- Artist: George Jones
- Year: 1824
- Type: Oil on canvas, history painting
- Dimensions: 124.5 cm × 172.8 cm (49.0 in × 68.0 in)
- Location: Tabley House, Cheshire

Sir John Leicester and the Cheshire Yeomanry Exercising on the Sands at Liverpool is an 1824 oil painting by the British artist George Jones. It depicts manoeuvres conducted by the Cheshire Yeomanry on the coast near Liverpool, overseen by their colonel Sir John Leicester. The unit was raised in 1797 to guard against the danger of French invasion. It later became known for its role in the Peterloo Massacre in 1819 amidst domestic unrest of the Regency era.

Leicester was a noted art collector known for his patronage of leading British artists of the period. He commissioned a separate painting of the same subject from a rival artist James Ward which was displayed at the Royal Academy Exhibition of 1824. While Jones focused on the exercise, portrayed, Ward's painting was dominated by Sir John Leicester in the foreground. Both pictures remain in the collection of Tabley House, the historic country estate of Leicester in Cheshire.

== Bibliography ==
- Cannon-Brookes, Peter. Paintings from Tabley. Heim, 1989.
- Leary, Frederick. The Earl of Chester's Regiment of Yeomanry Cavalry: Its Formation and Services, 1797-1897. Ballantyne Press, 1898.
- Poole, Robert. Peterlooo: The English Uprising. Oxford University Press, 2019.
