= Pandora Crowned by the Seasons =

Painting by William Etty

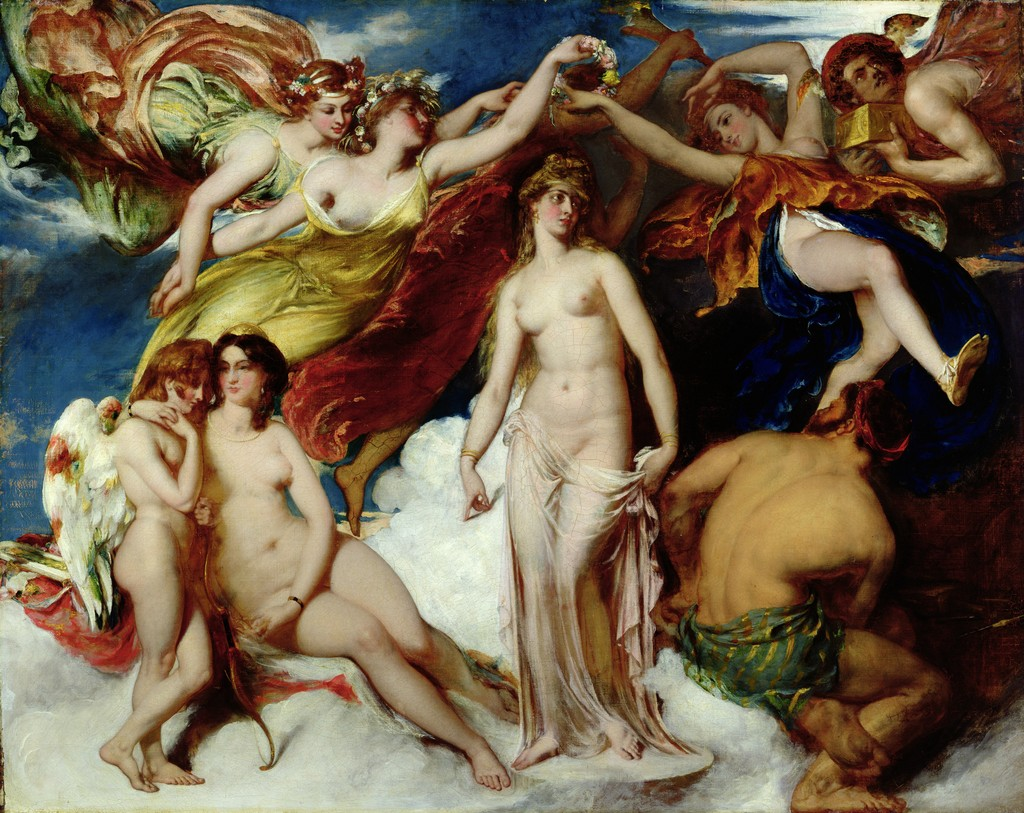
- Artist: William Etty
- Year: 1824
- Type: Oil on canvas, history painting
- Dimensions: 87.6 cm × 111.8 cm (34.5 in × 44.0 in)
- Location: Leeds Art Gallery, Yorkshire

Pandora Crowned by the Seasons an 1824 oil painting by the British artist William Etty. A mythological history painting) it depicts Pandora, surrounded by representations of the seasons. It is inspired by the writings of Hesiod Etty had begun a larger oil sketch version, which he exhibited at the British Institution in 1822. After returning to England from a visit to France and Italy, Etty worked on this version which differed significantly in composition.

The painting was displayed at the Royal Academy Exhibition of 1824 held at Somerset House in London, where it was purchased by the President of the Royal Academy Thomas Lawrence for three hundred guineas. Etty had once been Lawrence's pupil. Although it was well received by Etty's fellow artists, art critics were more negative. Today it is part of the collection of Leeds Art Gallery which acquired it in 1954.

== Bibliography ==
- Herrmann, Luke. Nineteenth Century British Painting. Charles de la Mare, 2000
- Robinson, Leonard. William Etty: The Life and Art. McFarland, 2007.
