= Lincoln from the South =

Painting by Peter De Wint

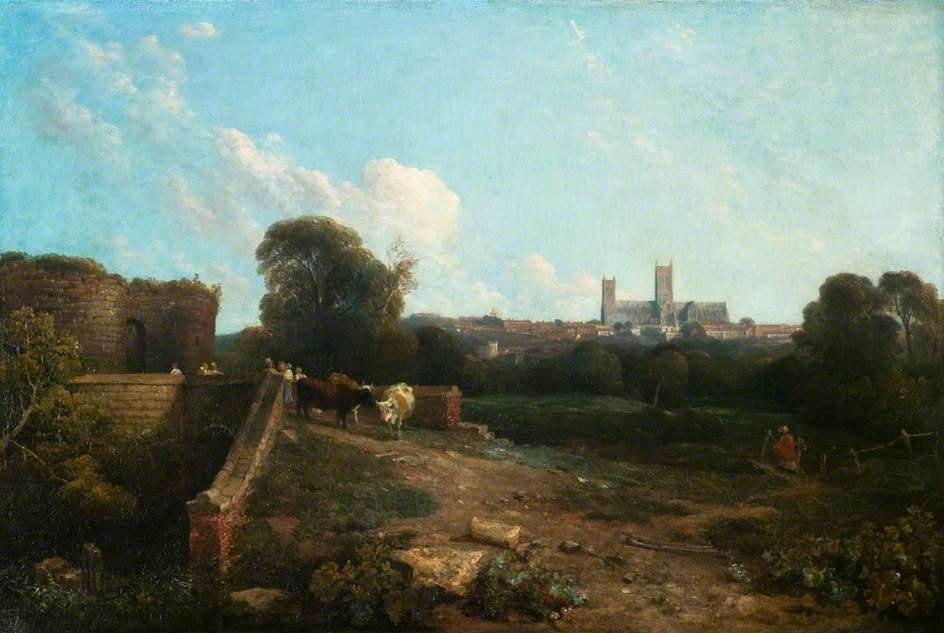
- Artist: Peter De Wint
- Year: c.1824
- Type: Oil on canvas, landscape painting
- Dimensions: 61 cm × 92 cm (24 in × 36 in)
- Location: Usher Gallery; Lincoln

Lincoln from the South is an 1824 landscape painting by the British artist Peter De Wint. It depicts a view of his native Lincoln from the south with Lincoln Cathedral on the hill in the distance. It features the now-demolished Medieval Bargate located just off the southern end of the High Street. While the Staffordshire-born De Wint was particularly known for his watercolours he also produced oil paintings too. The painting was displayed at the Royal Academy's Summer Exhibition of 1824 at Somerset House in London. Today it is in the collection of the Usher Gallery in Lincoln having been acquired in 1941.

== Bibliography ==
- Bower, Peter. Peter DeWint 1784-1849: For the Common Observer of Life and Nature. Lund Humphries, 2007.
- Smith, Hammond. Peter DeWint, 1784-1849. F. Lewis Publishers, 1982.
- Walker, Andrew (ed.) Aspects of Lincoln: Discovering Local History. Wharncliffe, 2002.
