= The Cottage Toilette =

Painting by David Wilkie

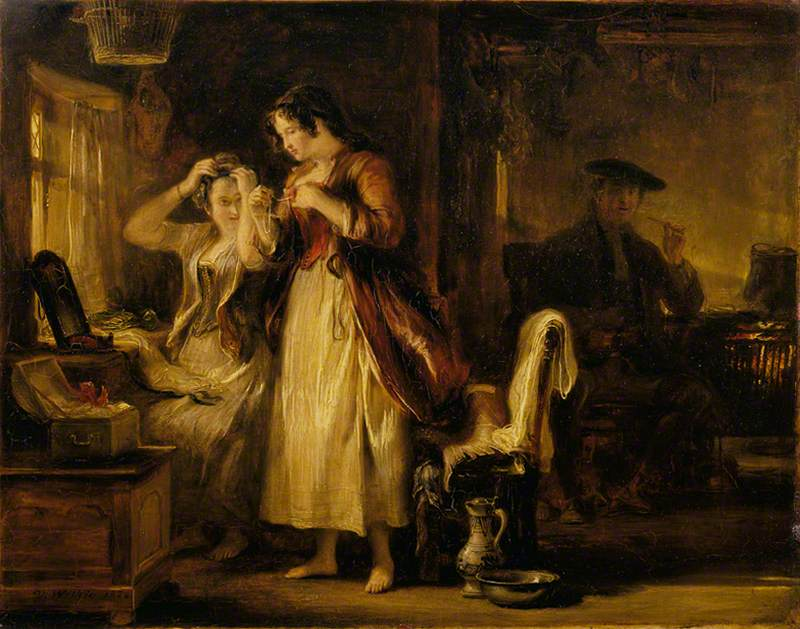
- Artist: David Wilkie
- Year: 1824
- Type: Oil on mahogany, genre painting
- Dimensions: 30.1 cm × 38.4 cm (11.9 in × 15.1 in)
- Location: Wallace Collection , London

The Cottage Toilette is an 1824 genre painting by the British artist David Wilkie. It depicts a scene from the 1725 play The Gentle Shepherd by the Scottish writer Allan Ramsay.

The painting was displayed at the Royal Academy Exhibition of 1824 at Somerset House in London. Today the work is in the Wallace Collection in Marylebone, having been acquired in 1853 by Marquess of Hertford.

== Bibliography ==
- Ingamells, John. The Wallace Collection: British, German, Italian, Spanish. Wallace Collection, 1985.
- Tromans, Nicholas. David Wilkie: The People's Painter. Edinburgh University Press, 2007.
- Wright, Christopher, Gordon, Catherine May & Smith, Mary Peskett. British and Irish Paintings in Public Collections: An Index of British and Irish Oil Paintings by Artists Born Before 1870 in Public and Institutional Collections in the United Kingdom and Ireland. Yale University Press, 2006.
