= Portrait of the Duke of Devonshire =

1824 painting by Thomas Lawrence

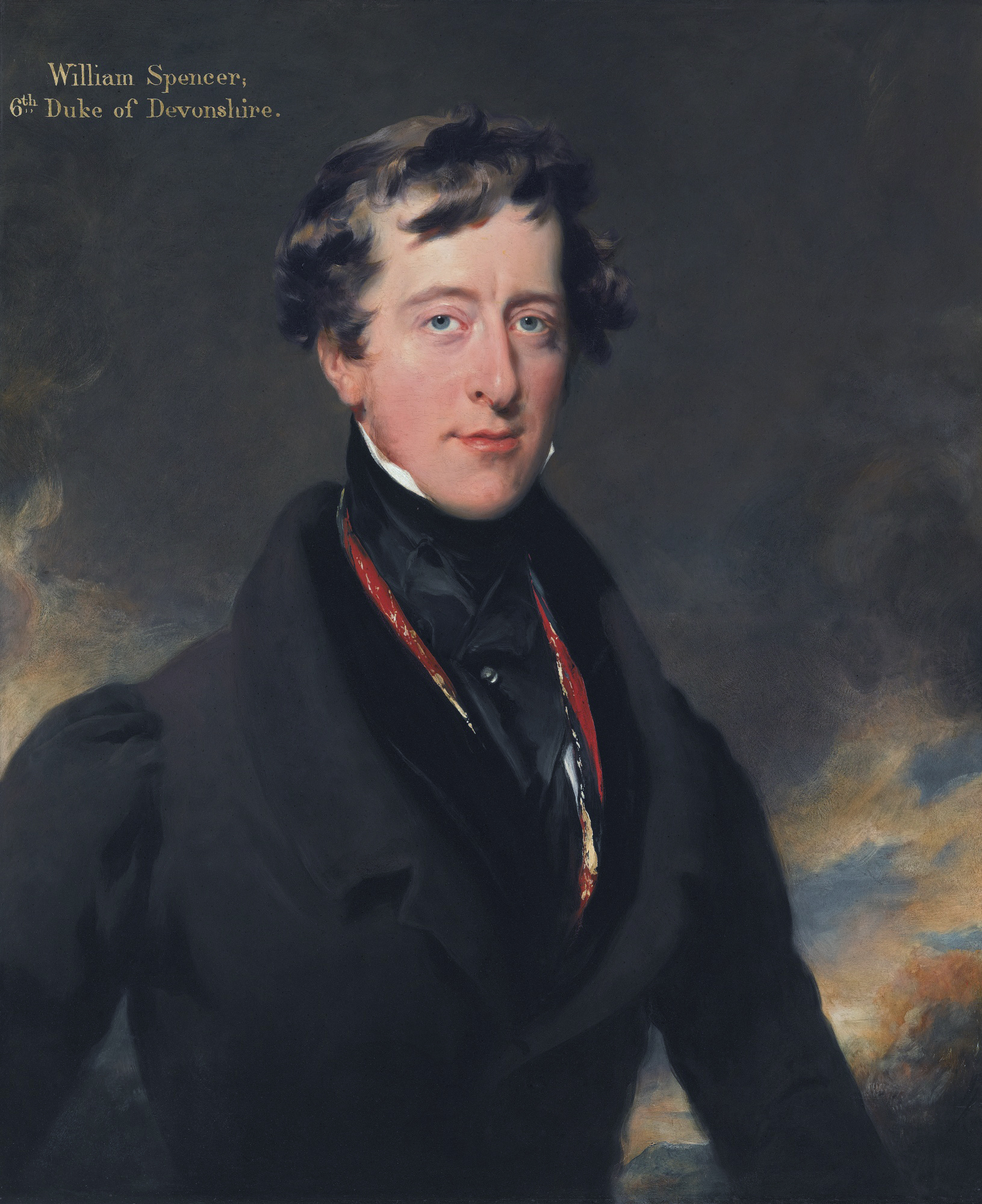
- Artist: Thomas Lawrence
- Year: 1824
- Type: Oil on panel, portrait painting
- Dimensions: 76 cm × 63.5 cm (30 in × 25.0 in)
- Location: Private collection

Portrait of the Duke of Devonshire is an 1824 portrait painting by the British artist Thomas Lawrence of the aristocrat and Whig politician William Cavendish, 6th Duke of Devonshire. Known as the Bachelor Duke he did extensive entertaining Regency era at Chiswick House near London and his country estate at Chatsworth House in Derbyshire. He was a notable art collector. it was the one of three paintings of the Duke by produced by Lawrence since he had succeeded to the tile in 1811. The painting was displayed at the Royal Academy's Summer Exhibition of 1824 at Somerset House in London. It was given by Lawrence to the sitter's sister Georgiana Howard, Countess of Carlisle and hung for many years at Castle Howard.

== Bibliography ==
- Gower, Ronald Sutherland. Sir Thomas Lawrence Goupil & Company, 1900.
- Lees-Milne, James. The Bachelor Duke. John Murray, 1991. ISBN 0719549205
- Levey, Michael. Sir Thomas Lawrence. National Portrait Gallery, 1979.
