= The Oriental Love Letter =

Painting by Henry William Pickersgil

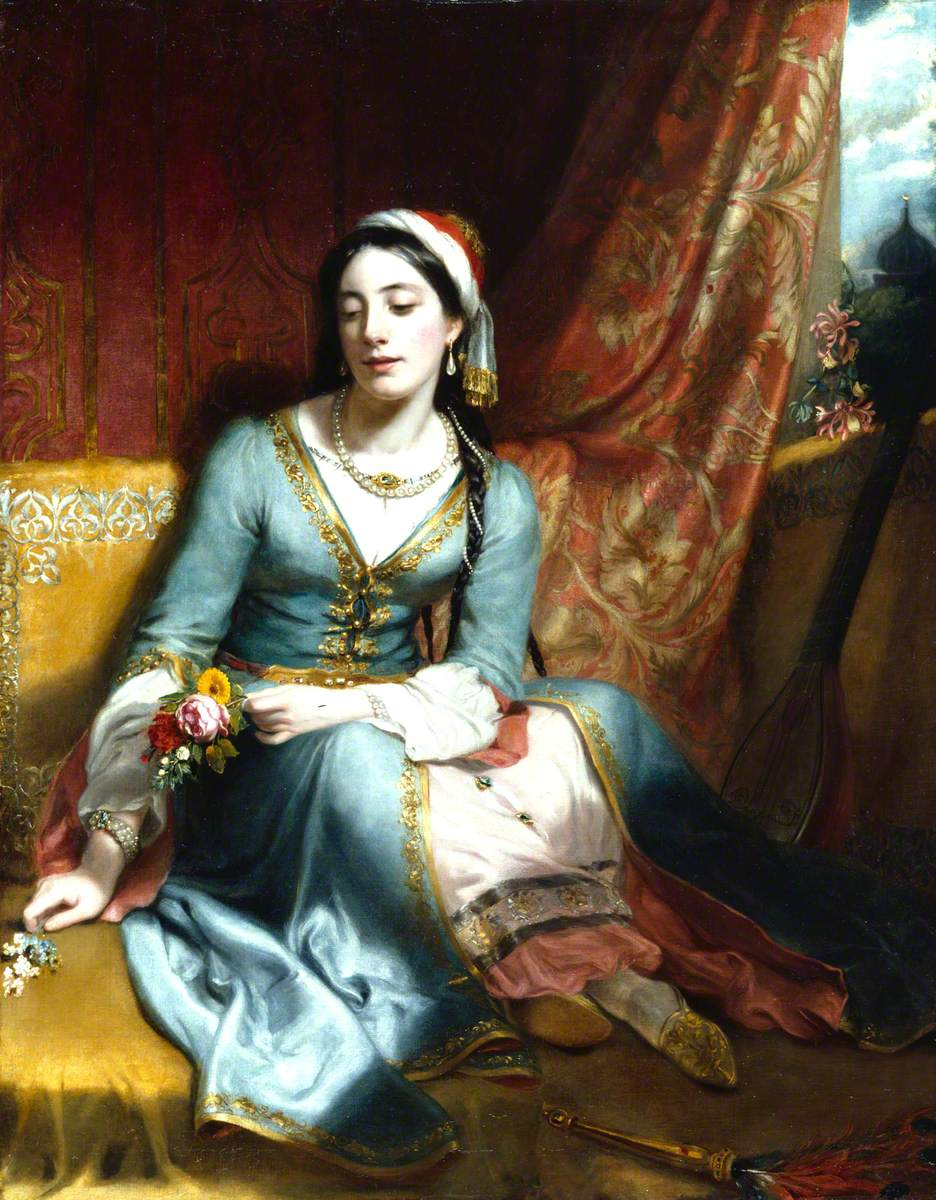
- Artist: Henry William Pickersgill
- Year: 1824
- Type: Oil on canvas, genre painting
- Dimensions: 142.6 cm × 111.8 cm (56.1 in × 44.0 in)
- Location: Royal Academy, London

The Oriental Love Letter is an oil on canvas genre painting by the British artist Henry William Pickersgill, from 1824.

== History and description ==
It shows a young woman somewhere in the Middle East. Although she might be taken for any well-dressed lady, the title makes clear that she is in a harem. The bouquet of flowers may represent a clandestine message from an admirer, or it is possible that she is arranging them herself to send to a secret lover.

Romantic in style it reflects the growing influence of Orientalism. The composition shows the influence of the 1782 Portrait of Jane Baldwin by Joshua Reynolds.

Pickersgill became best-known as a portrait painter, his career stretching from the Regency era into the well into the Victorian period. It was displayed at the Royal Academy Exhibition of 1824 held at Somerset House in London along with a quote by Lord Byron. When Pickersgill was elected to full membership of the Royal Academy of Arts in 1826 he was required to submit a diploma work and he chose to present this painting.

== Bibliography ==
- Class, Monika & Robinson, Terry F. Transnational England: Home and Abroad, 1780-1860. Cambridge Scholars Publishing, 2009.
- DelPlato, Joan. Multiple Wives, Multiple Pleasures: Representing the Harem, 1800-1875. Fairleigh Dickinson University Press, 2002.
- Kabbani, Rana. The Lure of the East: British Orientalist Painting. Yale Center for British Art, 2008.
