= Sunset at Sea after a Storm =

Painting by Francis Danby

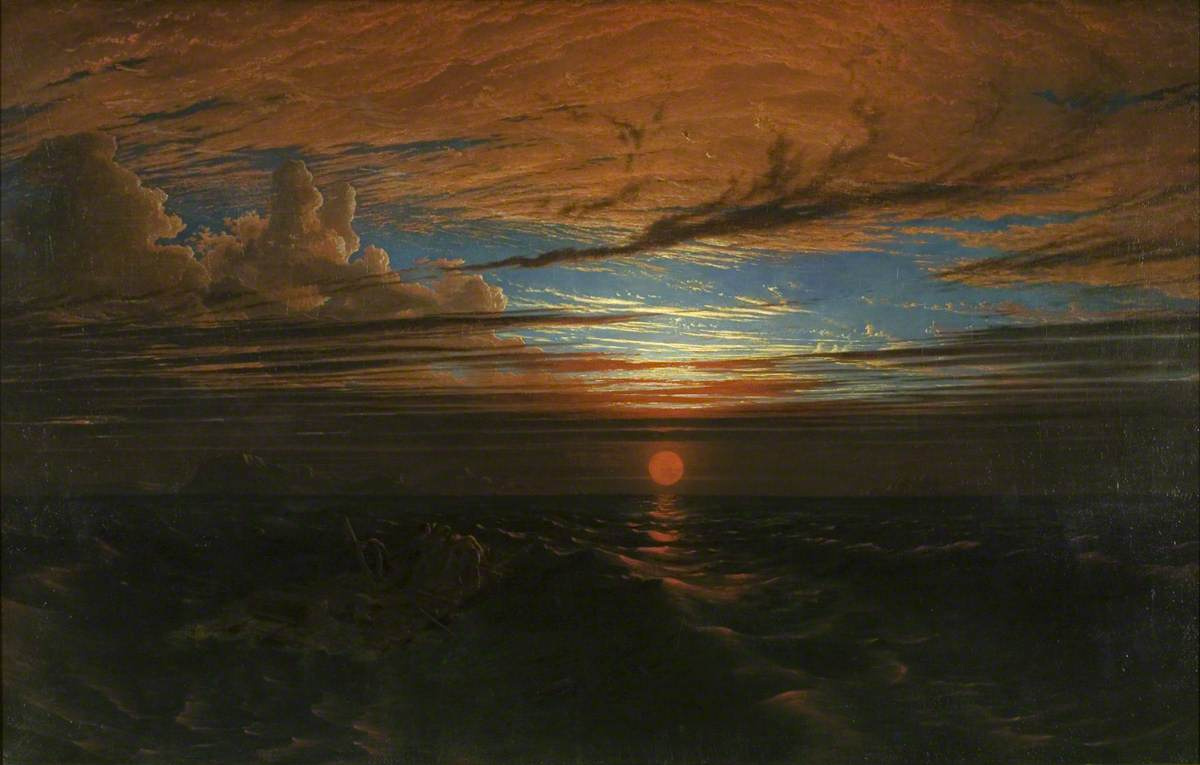
- Artist: Francis Danby
- Year: 1824
- Type: Oil on canvas, landscape painting
- Dimensions: 89.6 cm × 142.9 cm (35.3 in × 56.3 in)
- Location: Bristol City Museum and Art Gallery, Bristol

Sunset at Sea after a Storm is an oil on canvas landscape painting by the Irish artist Francis Danby, from 1824. It is held at the Bristol City Museum and Art Gallery.

== History and description ==
Danby was a member of the Bristol School of the Regency era but moved to London the same year he produced this painting. Romantic in style, it shows a red setting sun on the horizon, in the foreground is a raft with the survivors of a shipwreck. It is likely to have been inspired by French artist Théodore Géricault's 1819 painting The Raft of the Medusa.

The work was first displayed at the Bristol Institution and then at the Royal Academy's Summer Exhibition of 1824 at Somerset House in London where it attracted praise. It was purchased by the President of the Royal Academy Thomas Lawrence for a hundred pounds, twice the price that Danby was asking for it. The painting is today in the Bristol City Museum and Art Gallery, having been acquired in 1982.

== Bibliography ==
- Albinson, Cassandra, Funnell, Peter & Peltz, Lucy. Thomas Lawrence: Regency Power and Brilliance. Yale University Press, 2010.
- Carter, Julia. Bristol Museum and Art Gallery: Guide to the Art Collection. Bristol Books, 2017.
- Herrmann, Luke. Nineteenth Century British Painting. Charles de la Mare, 2000.
