= Portrait of the Duke of Angoulême (Vernet) =

Painting by Horace Vernet

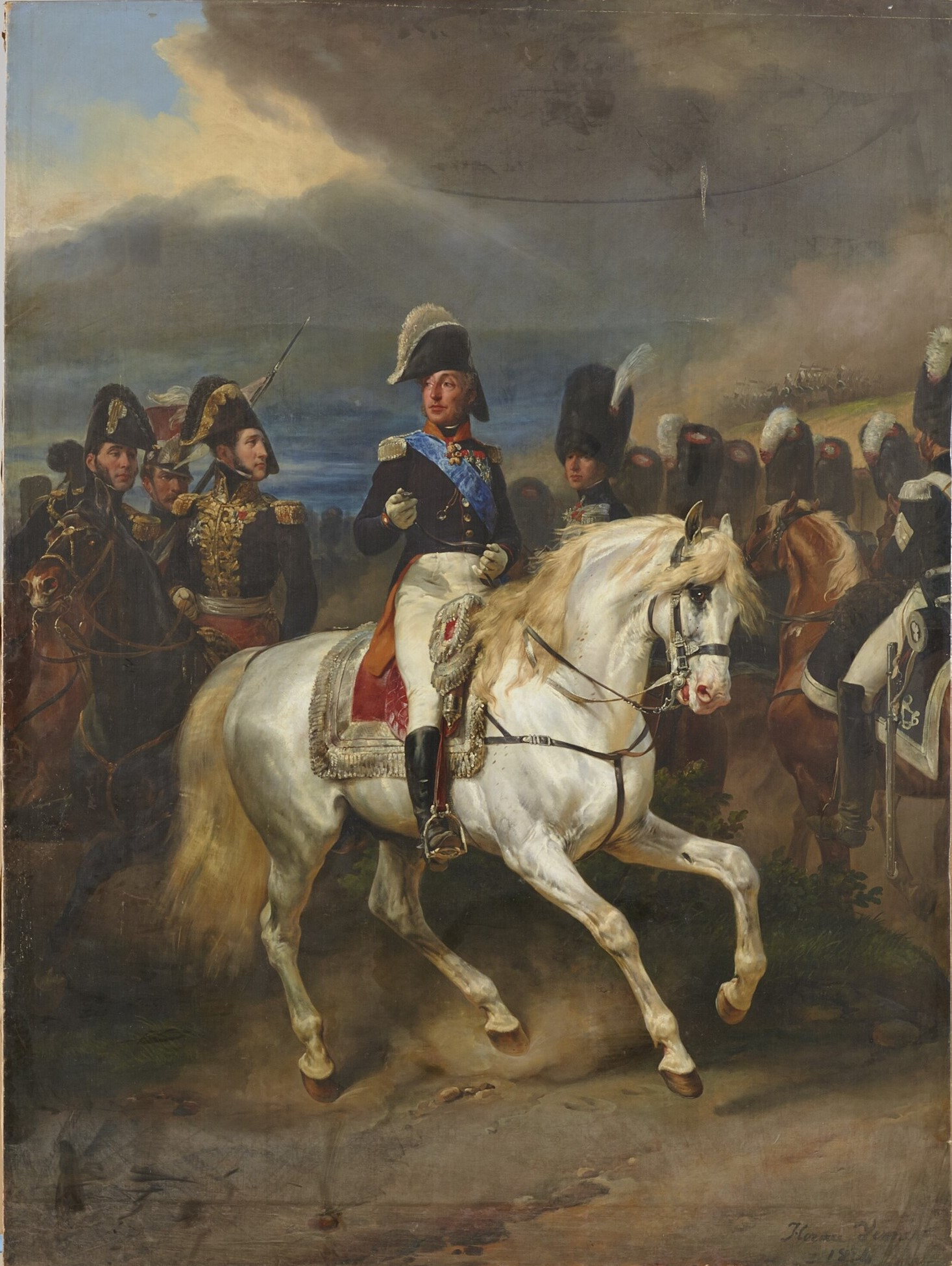
- Artist: Horace Vernet
- Year: 1824
- Type: Oil on canvas, portrait painting
- Dimensions: 391 cm × 290.5 cm (154 in × 114.4 in)
- Location: Palace of Versailles; Versailles

Portrait of the Duke of Angoulême is an 1824 portrait painting by the French artist Horace Vernet. An equestrian portrait, it depicts the French prince and soldier Louis Antoine, Duke of Angoulême. He is shown in command of French expedition to Spain he led to aid Ferdinand VII in 1823. The year the painting was produced Angoulême's father Charles X came to the throne and he became Dauphin.

The painting was Commissioned for 10,000 francs by Angoulême's distant cousin the Duke of Orleans for his residence at the Château de Saint-Cloud. It as exhibited at the Salon of 1824 at the Louvre in Paris. Ironically in the July Revolution of 1830 Orleans would take the throne as Louis Philippe following the overthrow of Charles X. Styled Louis XIX by his supporters, Angoulême led the Legitimate movement in exile. The painting has been in the collection of the Palace of Versailles since 1849.

The depiction of a cool, unflustered commander on horseback became the template for Vernet's depictions of Napoleon in three paintings he produced for the Galerie des Batailles at Versailles a decade later. These contrasted with the panoramic battle scenes he has previously produced and more chaotic such as The Crossing of the Arcole Bridge.

== Bibliography ==
- Hornstein, Katie. Picturing War in France, 1792–1856. Yale University Press, 2018.
- Ruutz-Rees, Janet Emily. Horace Vernet. Scribner and Welford, 1880.
