= The Cherry Seller =

Painting by William Collins

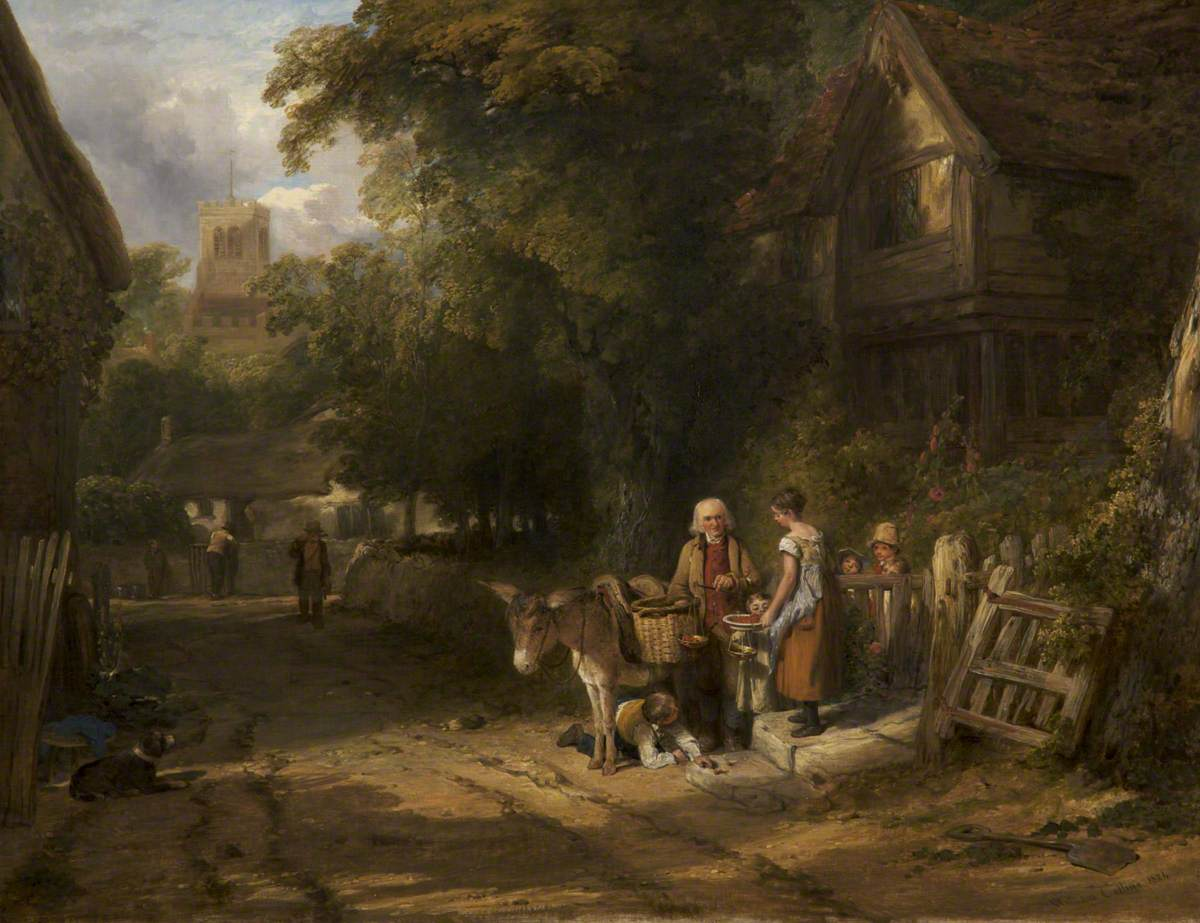
- Artist: William Collins
- Year: 1824
- Type: Oil on canvas, genre painting
- Dimensions: 69 cm × 89.5 cm (27 in × 35.2 in)
- Location: Bury Art Museum, Greater Manchester

The Cherry Seller is an 1824 genre painting by the British artist William Collins. It depicts an itinerant cherry seller in an English village with his donkey. Collins was known for his nostalgic genre scenes of English rural life.

The painting was displayed at the Royal Academy Exhibition of 1824 held at Somerset House in London. It was subsequently turned into a popular print for The Art Journal by George C. Finden. It was owned at that time by the politician and art collector Robert Peel who had twice Prime Minister at his Drayton Manor estate. The painting is in the Bury Art Museum in Greater Manchester, having been acquired as a gift in 1897. The artist's son Wilkie Collins mentions the painting in his 1848 book Memoirs of the Life of William Collins.

== Bibliography ==
- Haskins, Katherine. The Art-Journal and Fine Art Publishing in Victorian England, 1850–1880. Taylor & Francis, 2017.
