= High Street and the Lawn Market, Edinburgh =

Painting by Alexander Nasmyth

- Artist: Alexander Nasmyth
- Year: 1824
- Type: Oil on canvas, landscape painting
- Dimensions: 108 cm × 148 cm (43 in × 58 in)
- Location: Royal Collection

High Street and the Lawn Market, Edinburgh is an 1824 landscape painting by the British artist Alexander Nasmyth. It portrays a view of the Lawnmarket in the Royal Mile of Edinburgh during the Regency era.In the foreground are the remains of the fourteenth century Weigh House which had recently demolished.

Along with its companion piece The Port of Leith the painting was possibly produced to commemorate the visit of Visit of George IV to Scotland in 1822. Both works were displayed at the Royal Academy Exhibition of 1824 at Somerset House in London. In 1949 the painting was given by the City of Edinburgh to the future Elizabeth II and today is part of the Royal Collection.

== Bibliography ==
- Clarke, Deborah & Remington, Vanessa. Scottish Artists 1750-1900: From Caledonia to the Continent. Royal Collection Trust, 2015.
- Cooksey, J.C.B. Alexander Nasmyth, H.R.S.A., 1758-1840: A Man of the Scottish Renaissance. Paul Harris, 1991.
