= A Fishmarket near Boulogne =

Painting by Richard Parkes Bonington

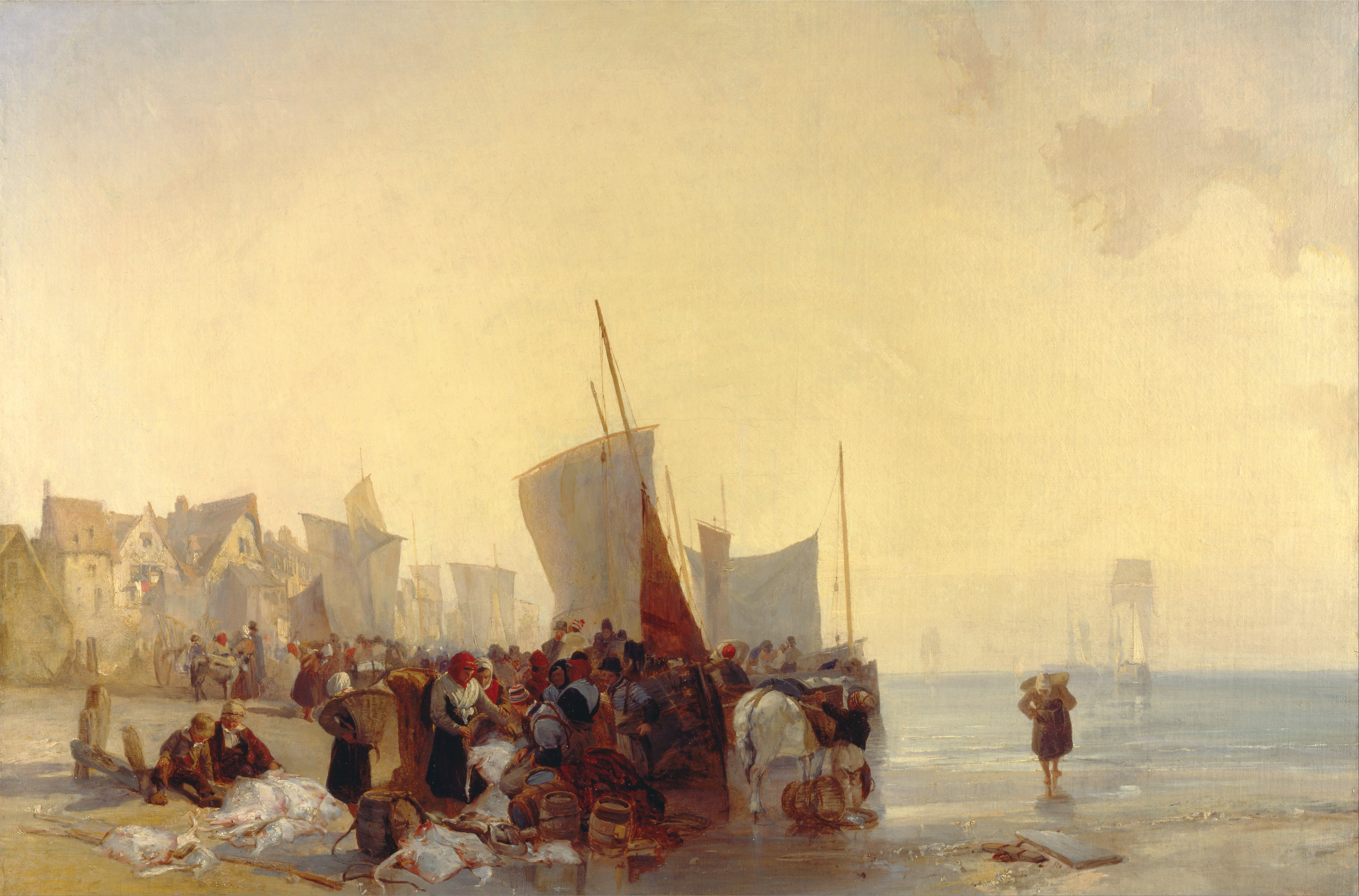
- Artist: Richard Parkes Bonington
- Year: 1824
- Type: Oil on canvas, landscape
- Dimensions: 82.2 cm × 122.6 cm (32.4 in × 48.3 in)
- Location: Yale Center for British Art, New Haven

A Fishmarket near Boulogne is an oil on canvas landscape painting by the British artist Richard Parkes Bonington, from 1824.

== History and description ==
Born in England, he moved with his family to France shortly after the end of the Napoleonic Wars. He became celebrated for his views of the French countryside and coasts before his early death from tuberculosis. The painting, one of his earliest oil on canvas works, shows a fish market somewhere on the French coast. Painted while he was staying in Dunkirk, its identification as representing Boulogne only came several decades later.

It has been considered one of the five works that Bonington exhibited at the Paris Salon in 1824 winning him a gold medal. While there is now some doubt about this, it has been described as being "without question one of the most ambitious and accomplished of his early paintings." Today it is in the Yale Center for British Art as part of the Paul Mellon collection.

== Bibliography ==
- Duffy, Stephen. Richard Parkes Bonington. Wallace Collection, 2009.
- Herrmann, Luke. Nineteenth Century British Painting. Charles de la Mare, 2000.
- Noon, Patrick & Bann, Stephen. Constable to Delacroix: British Art and the French Romantics. Tate, 2003.
- Spencer-Longhurst, Paul. The Sun Rising Through Vapour: Turner's Early Seascapes. Third Millennium Information, 2003.
