= Royal Academy Exhibition of 1824 =

1824 art exhibition in London

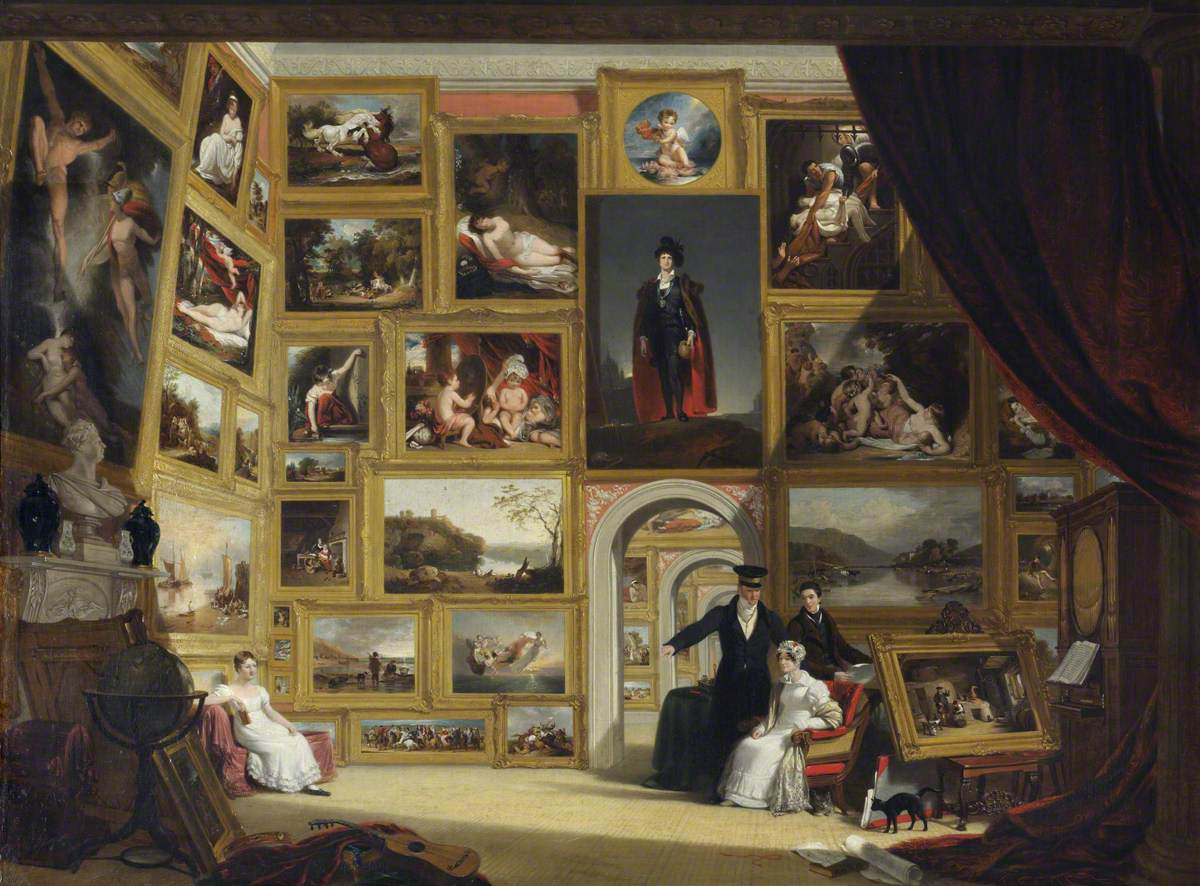
A Modern Picture Gallery by William Frederick Witherington

The Royal Academy Exhibition of 1824 was an art exhibition held at Somerset House in London. Running from 3 May to 10 July 1824 it was the fifty sixth annual Summer Exhibition of the British Royal Academy. Some critics expressed concern about they regarded as the poor quality of the works on display, and suggested this might signal a decline in British art. Ironically, this was the same year British artists enjoyed great success at the Salon of 1824 in Paris which was dubbed the "British Salon" because of the impact of the pictures.

J.M.W. Turner was noted for his absence. Thomas Lawrence, the President of the Royal Academy, submitted a series of portraits that includes his Portrait of the Duke of Devonshire and Portrait of the Duchess of Gloucester as well as The Calmady Children. A number of other noted portraitists who had emerged in the Regency era also displayed works including Martin Archer Shee, William Beechey and Margaret Sarah Carpenter. John Constable featured The Lock the latest of his "six-footers" which he had been displaying at the Academy since 1819. William Etty submitted Pandora Crowned by the Seasons, one of his characteristic nude scenes with a classical theme.

In genre painting David Wilkie displayed Smugglers as well as The Cottage Toilette, based on a scene from The Gentle Shepherd by Allan Ramsay. William Collins showed several landscapes as well as the genre painting The Cherry Seller. Edward Villiers Rippingilles The Stage Coach Breakfast, a genre scene in a coaching inn that also featured portraits of leading writers of the period. Francis Danby, like Rippingille a member of the Bristol School, submitted Sunset at Sea after a Storm which drew inspiration from Théodore Géricault's The Raft of the Medusa. It received critical praise and Thomas Lawrence bought it for twice Danby's asking price.

One of the works on display was A Modern Picture Gallery by William Frederick Witherington. It depiction of an idealised art gallery featured many paintings by major British artists of the previous decades. Its production coincided with the opening of the National Gallery the same year, which focused initially on Old Masters rather than more recent British works. The following year's Royal Academy Exhibition of 1825 saw the return of Turner as well as further portraits by Lawrence and landscapes by Constable.

== Gallery ==
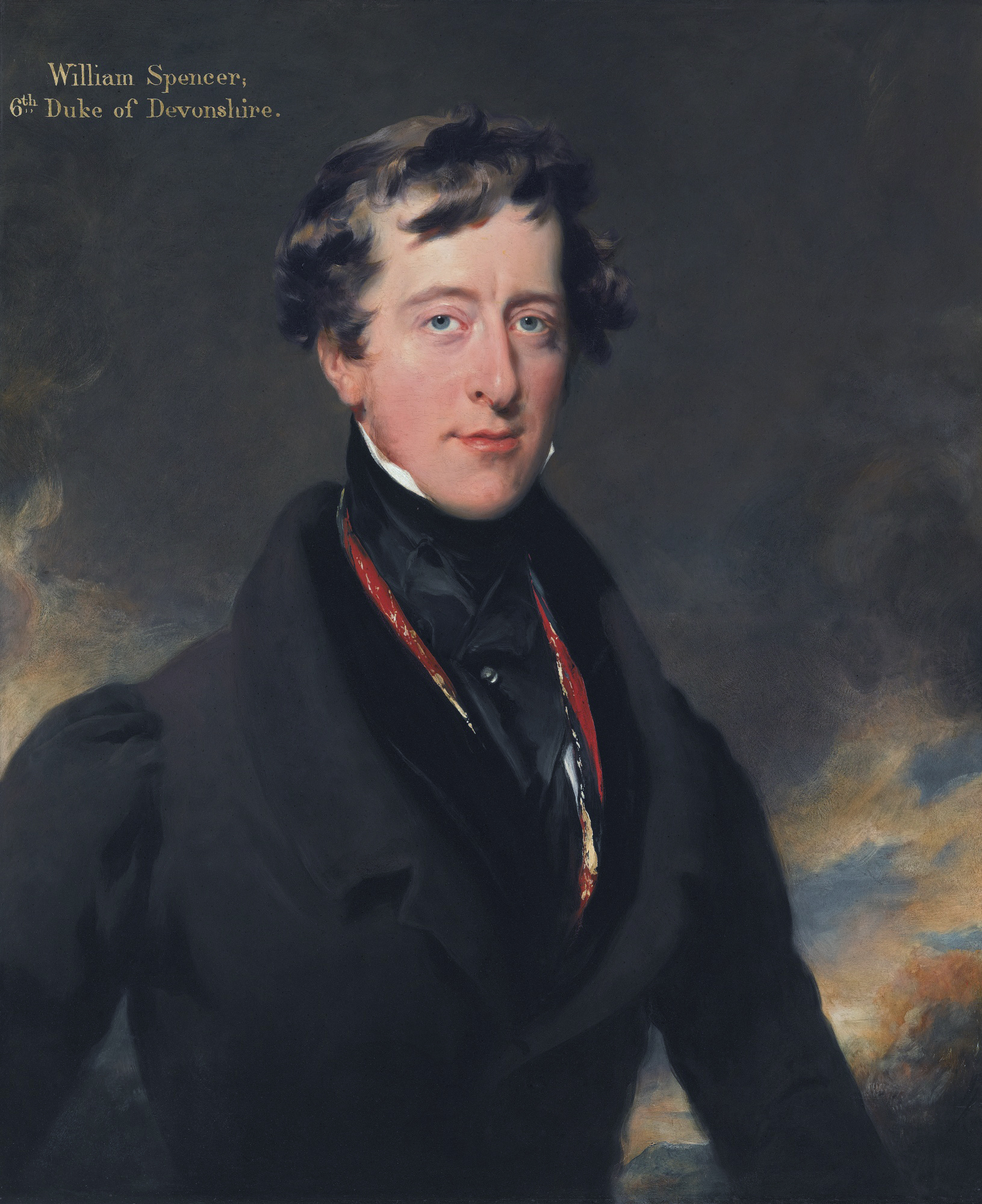
Portrait of the Duke of Devonshire by Thomas Lawrence

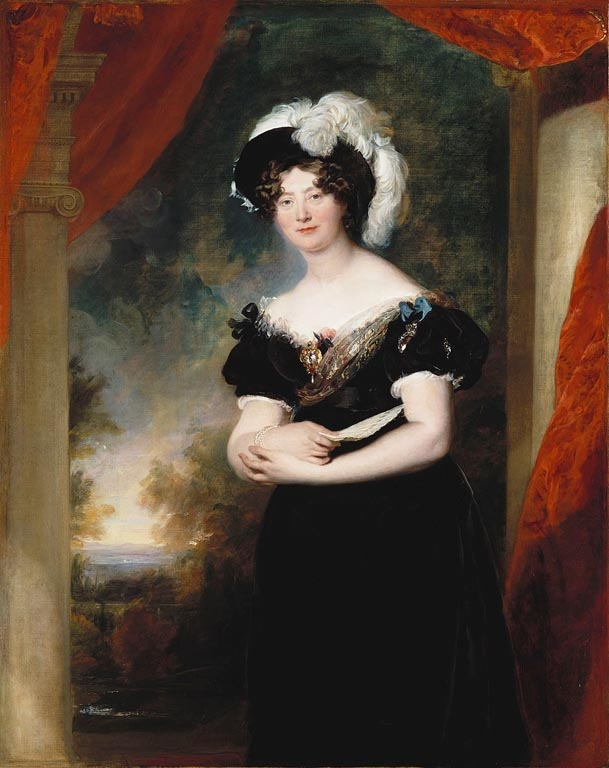
Portrait of the Duchess of Gloucester by Thomas Lawrence

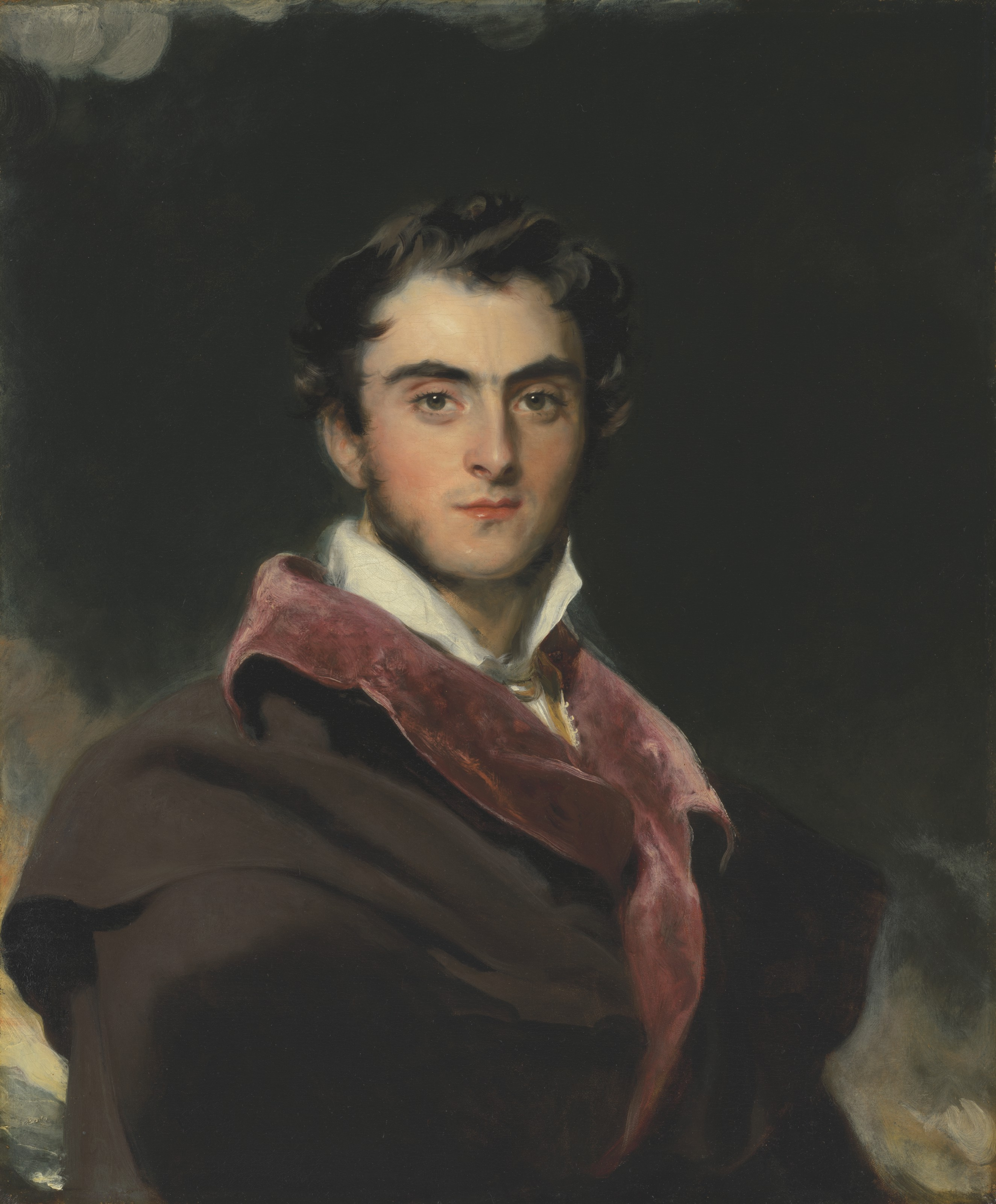
Portrait of Lord Clanwilliam by Thomas Lawrence. Lawrence exhibited a full-length version of this earlier portrait

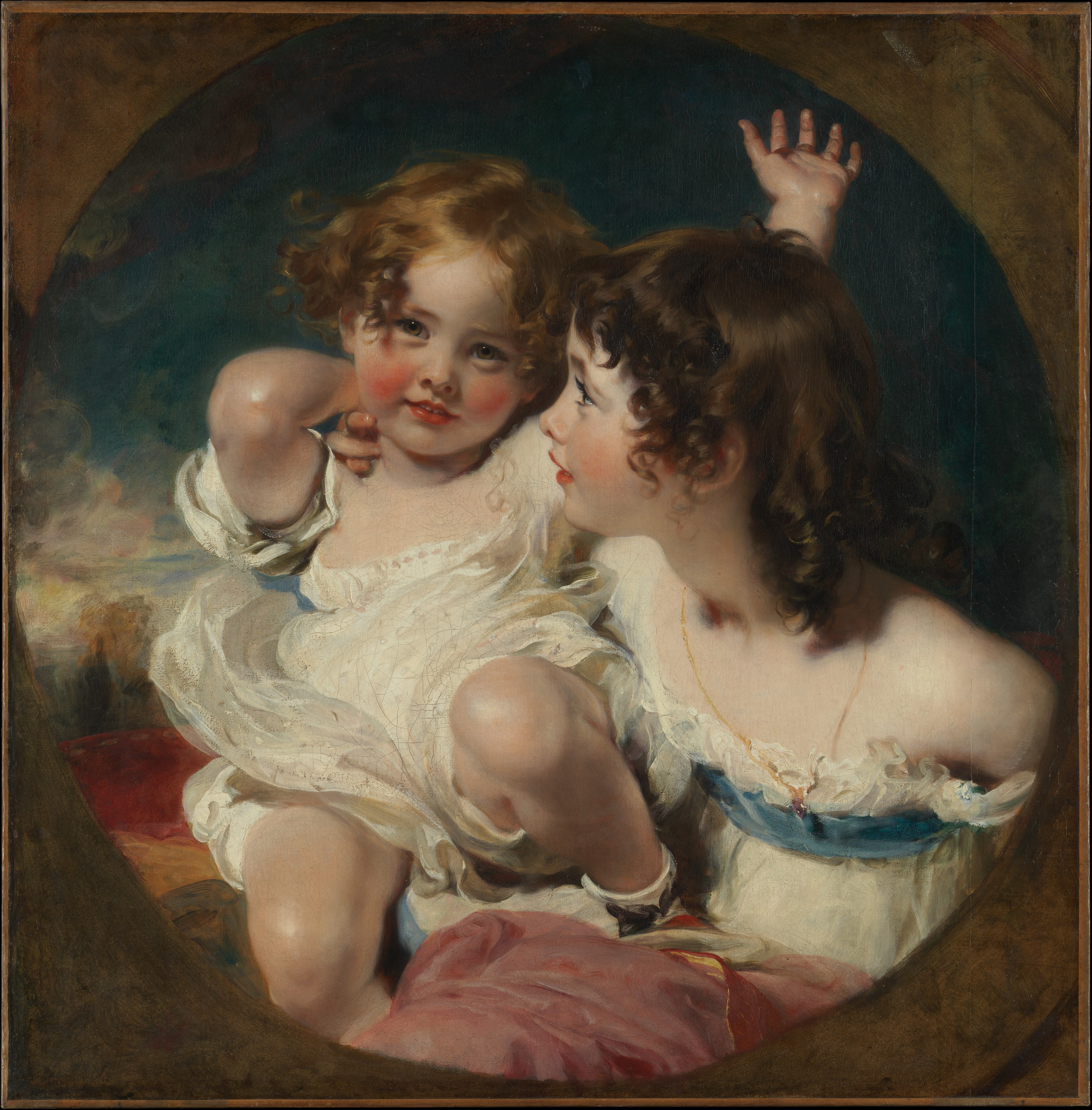
The Calmady Children by Thomas Lawrence

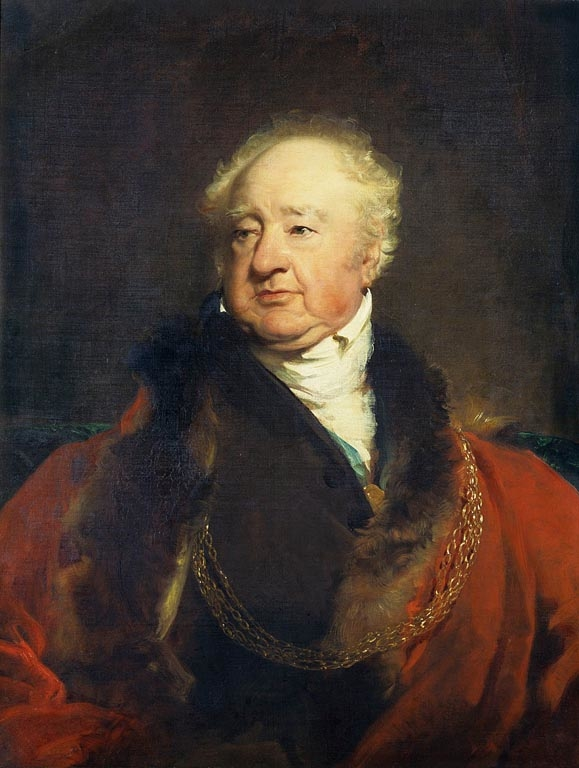
Portrait of Sir William Curtis by Thomas Lawrence

Portrait of Lord Castlereagh by Thomas Lawrence

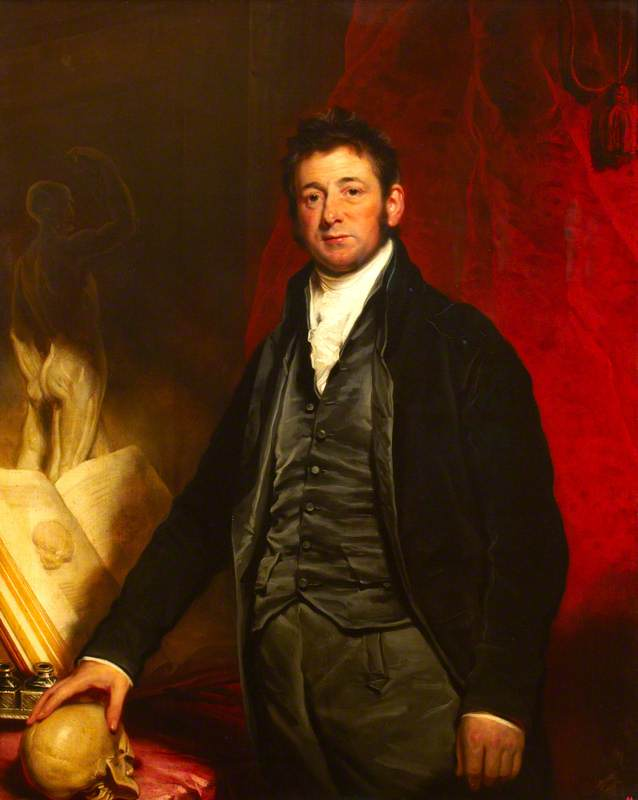
Portrait of Anthony Carlisle by Martin Archer Shee

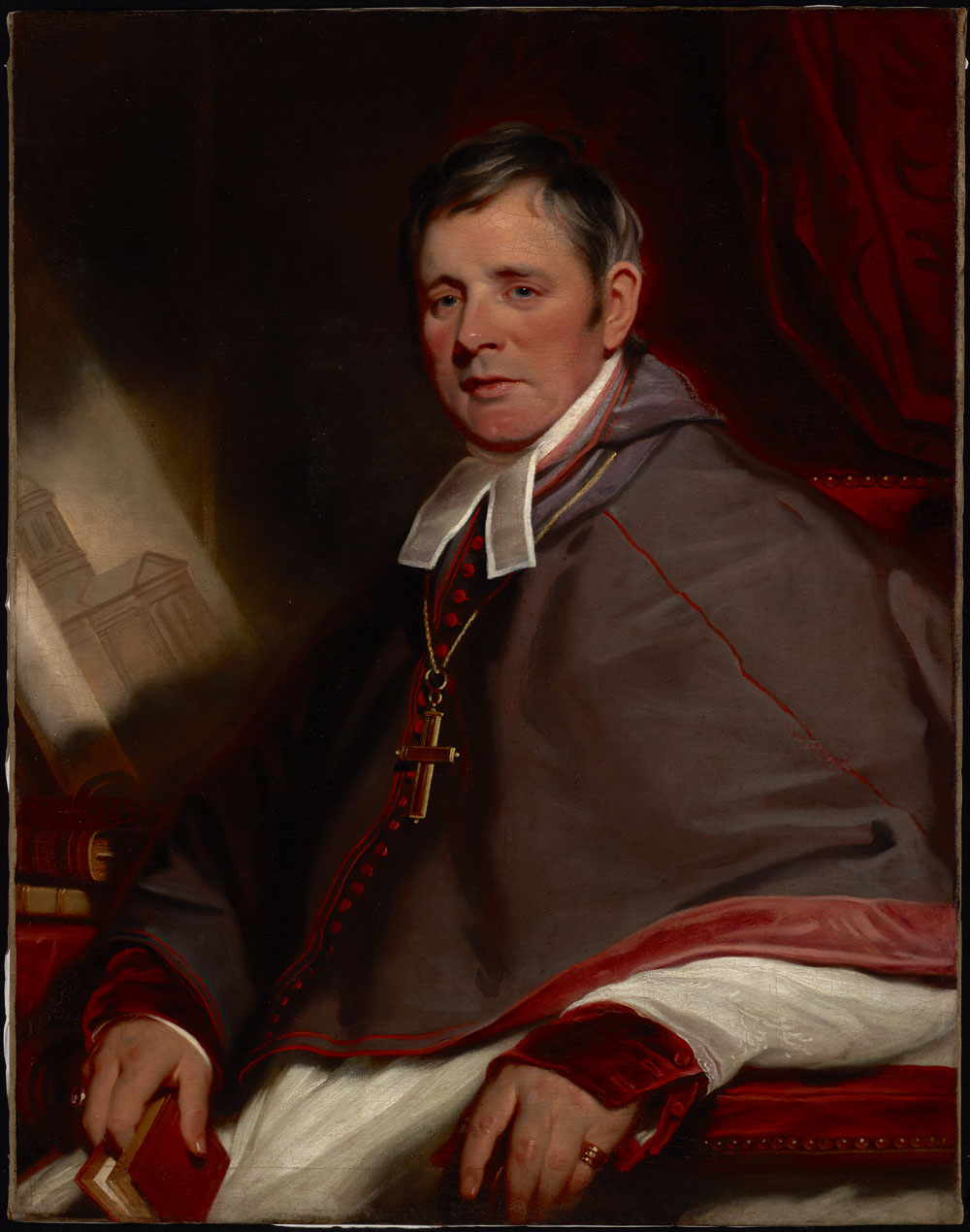
Portrait of Alexander Macdonnell by Martin Archer Shee

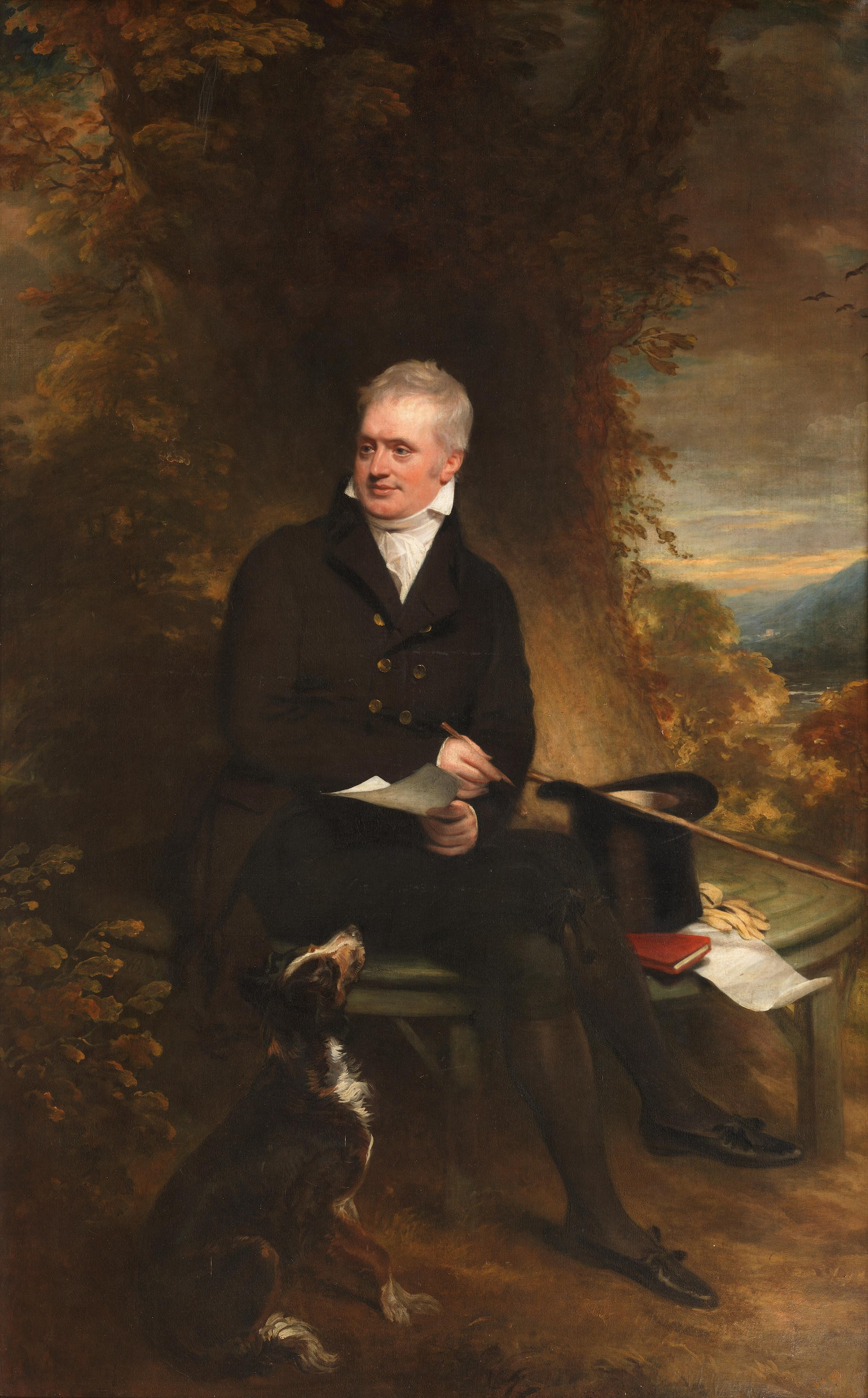
Portrait of Thomas Lowndes by William Beechey

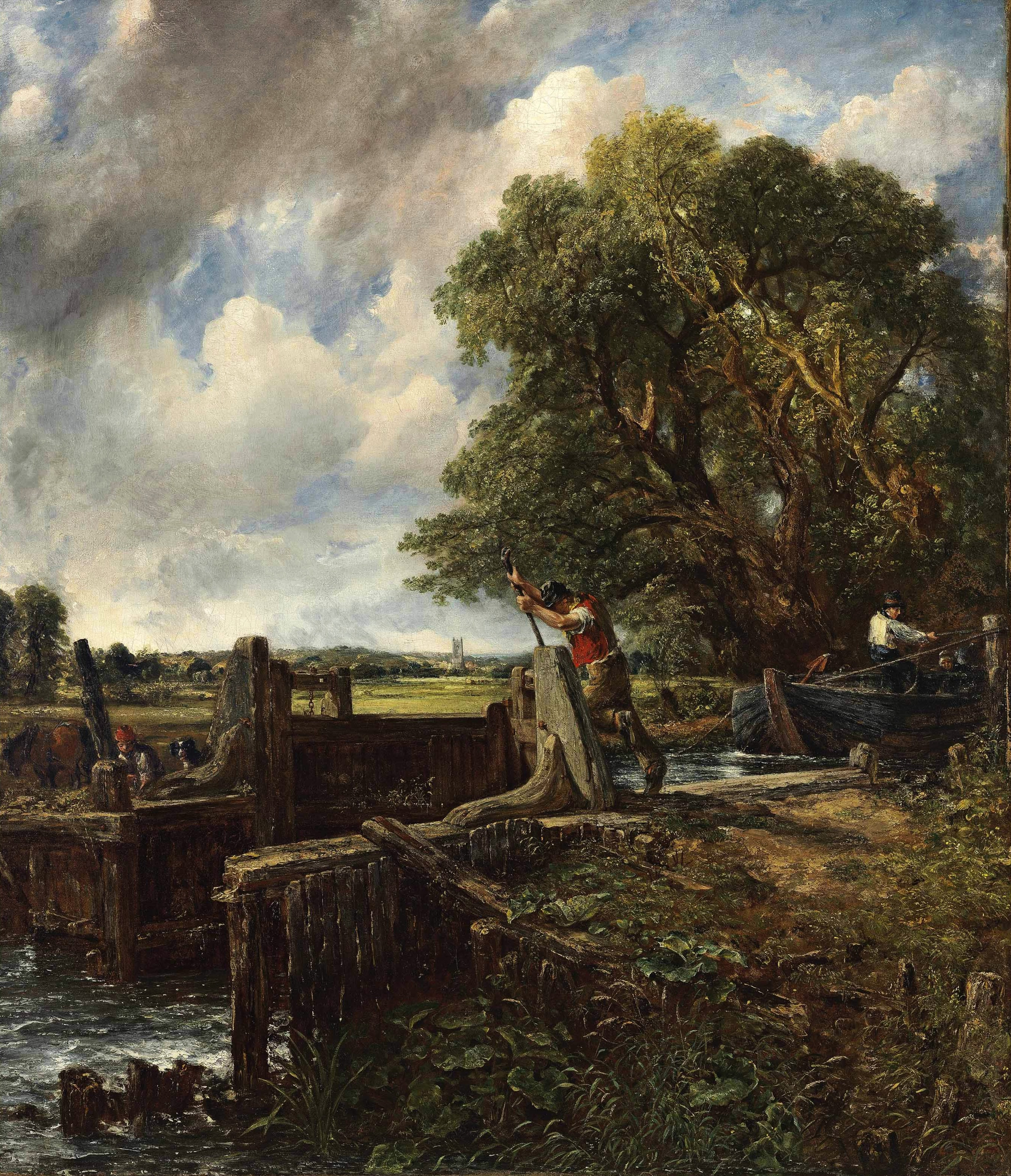
The Lock by John Constable

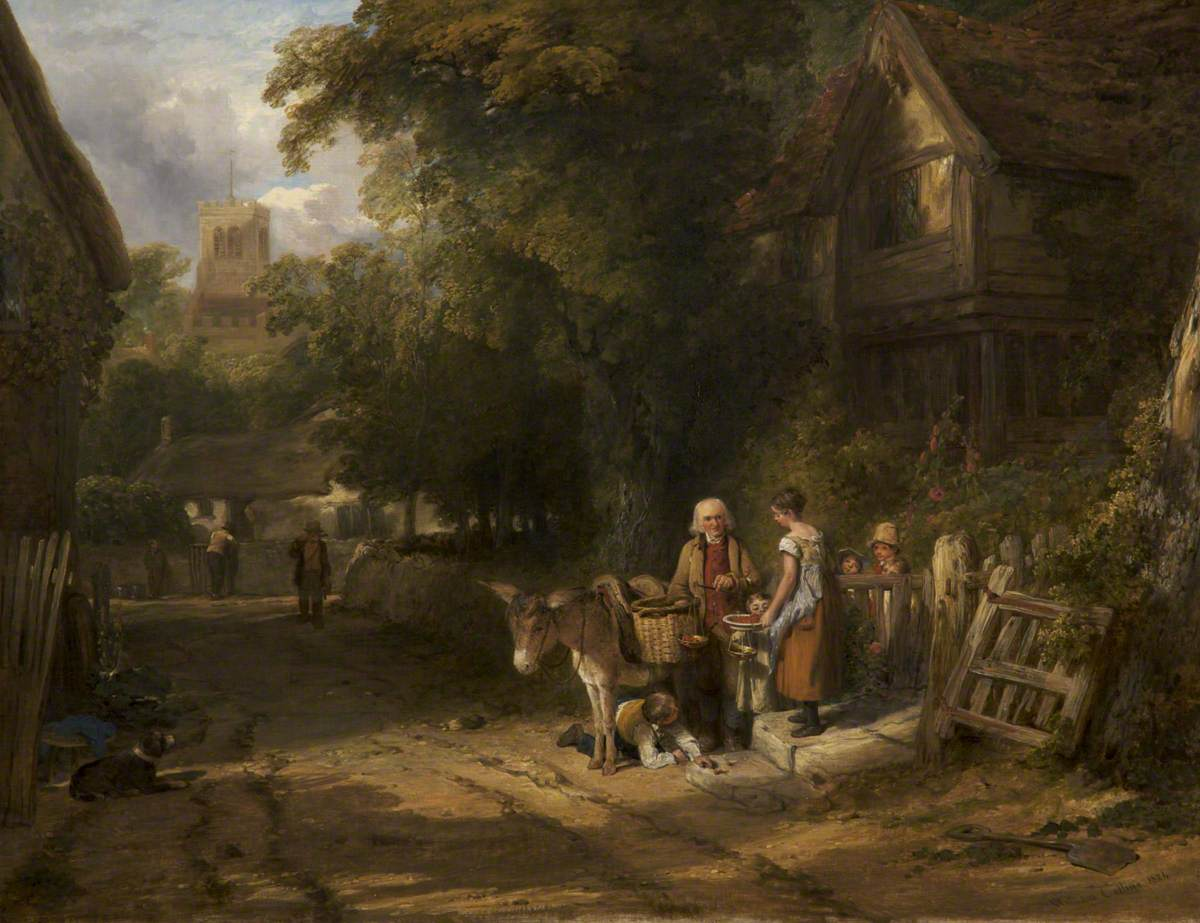
The Cherry Seller by William Collins

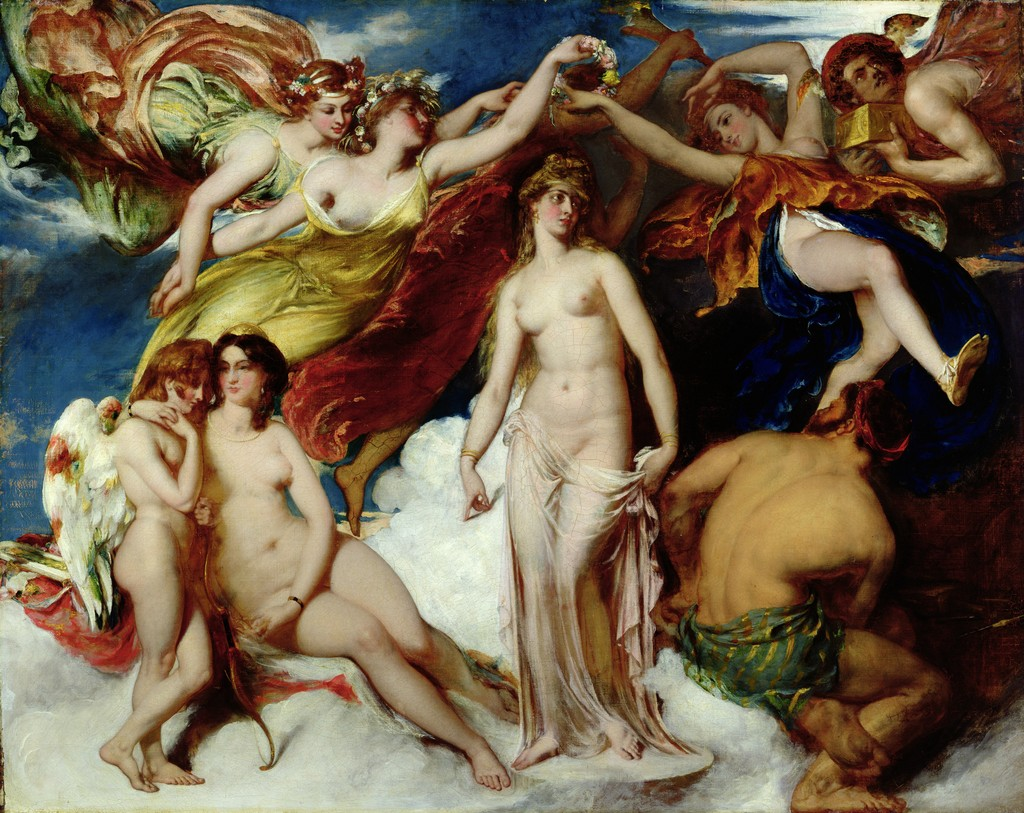
Pandora Crowned by the Seasons by William Etty

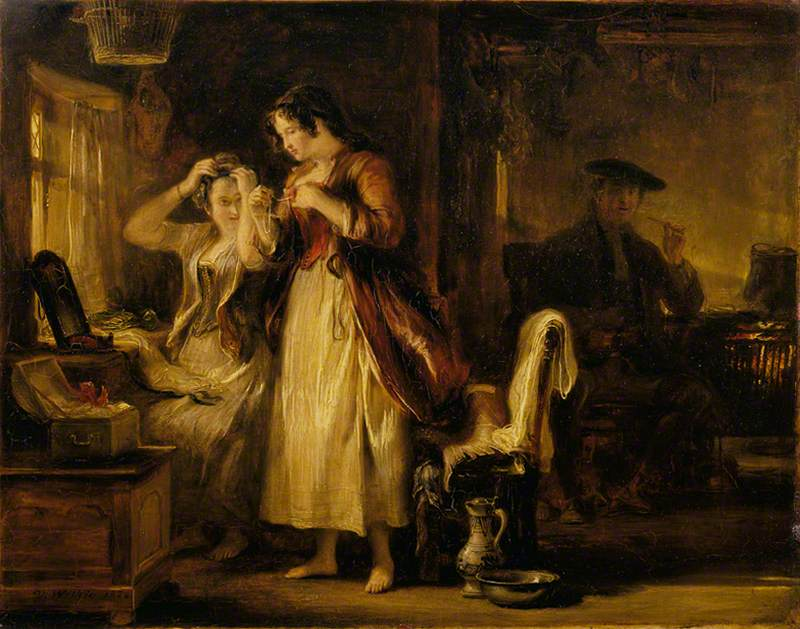
The Cottage Toilette by David Wilkie

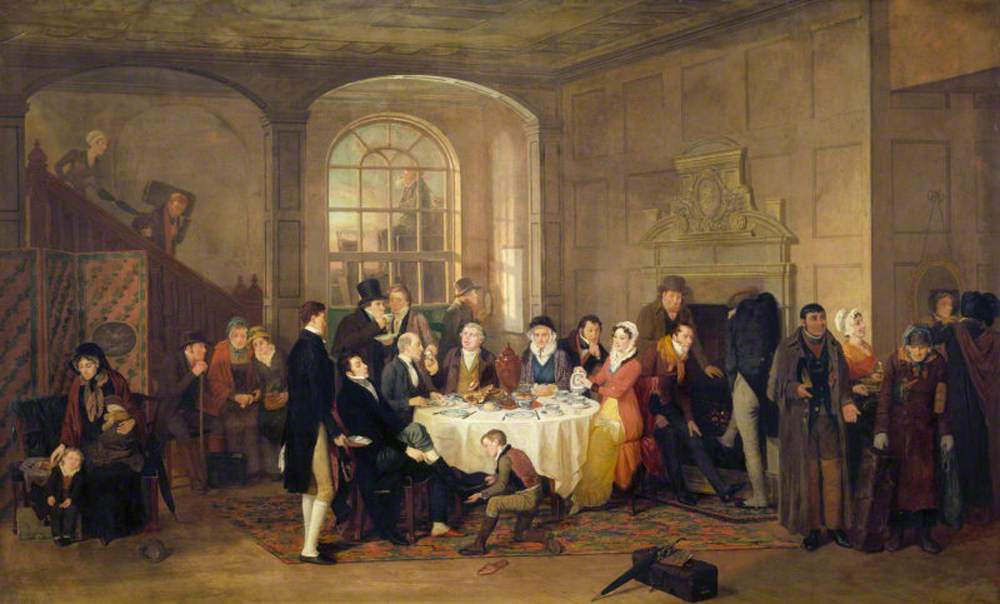
The Stage Coach Breakfast by Edward Villiers Rippingille

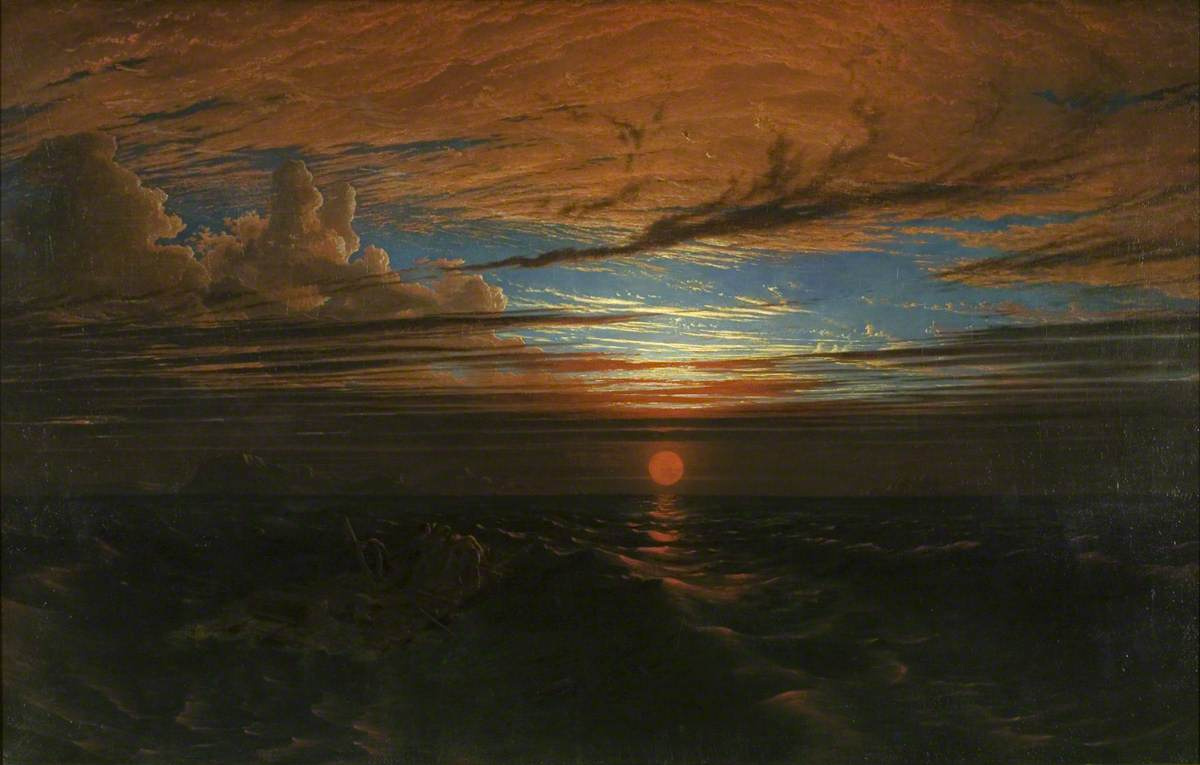
Sunset at Sea after a Storm by Francis Danby

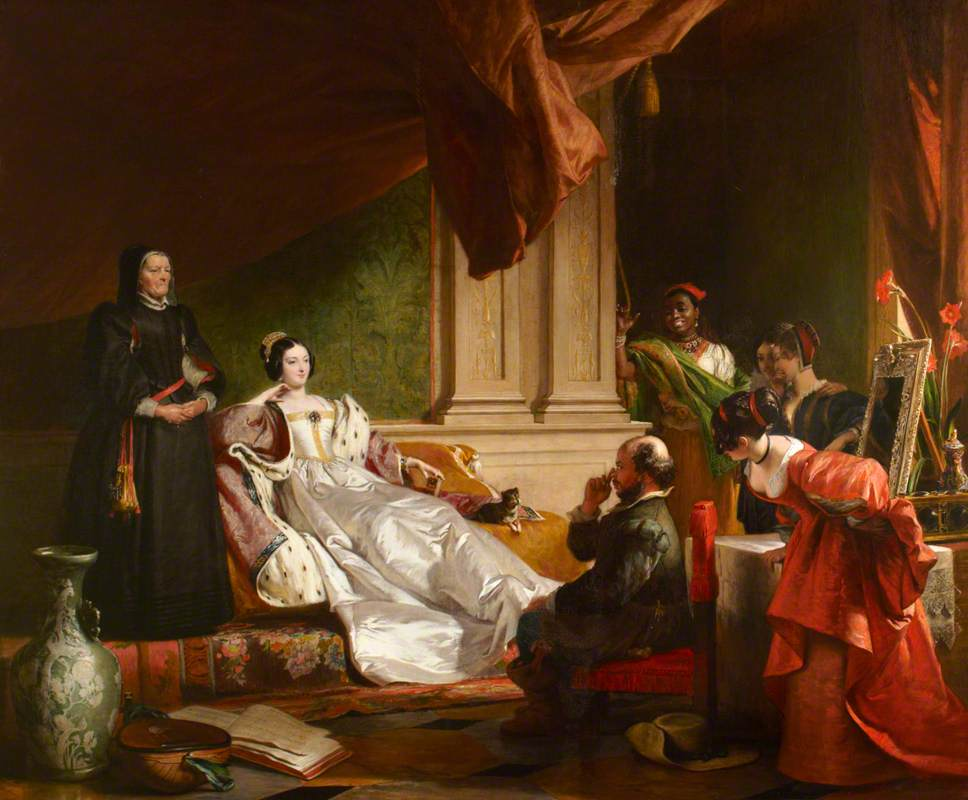
Sancho Panza and the Duchess by Charles Robert Leslie

Rochester by Augustus Wall Callcott

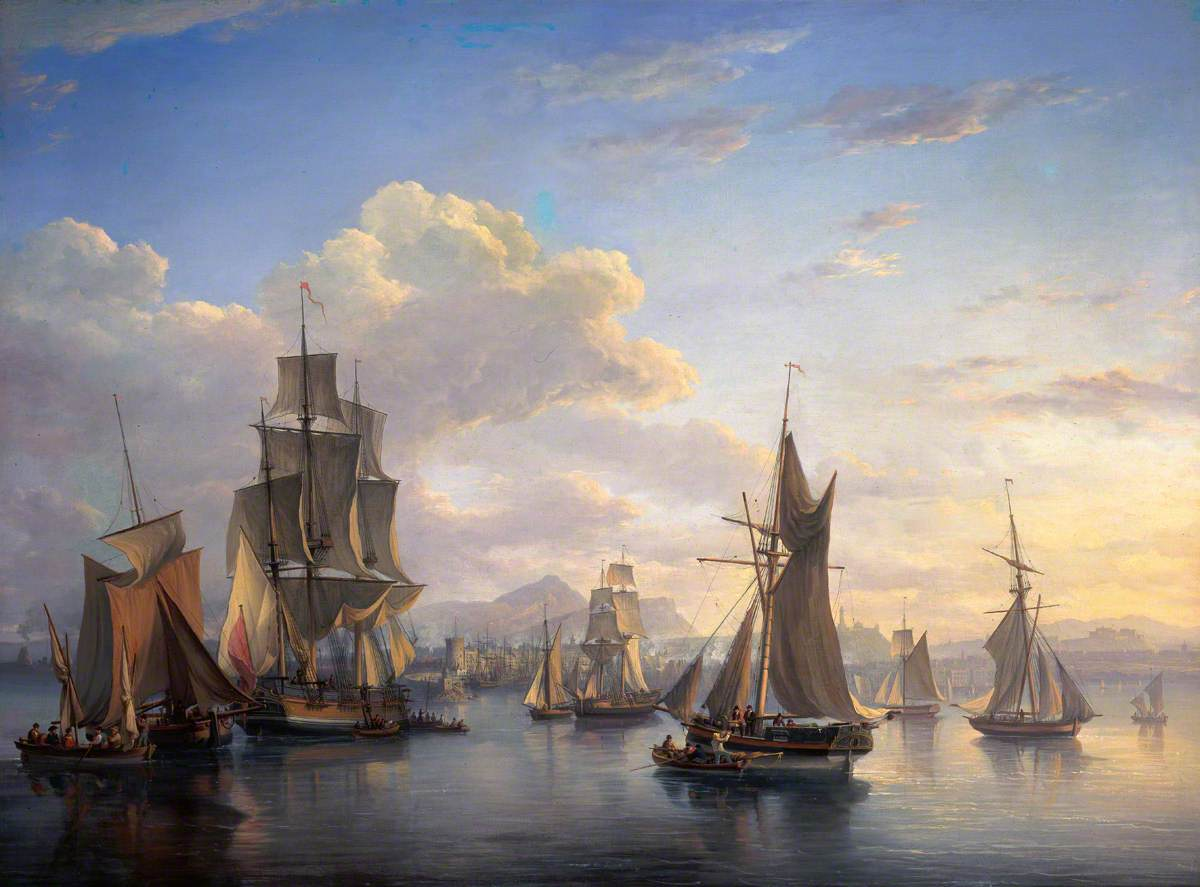
The Port of Leith by Alexander Nasmyth

High Street and the Lawn Market, Edinburgh by Alexander Nasmyth

Neptune by Edwin Landseer

Brunette by Edwin Landseer

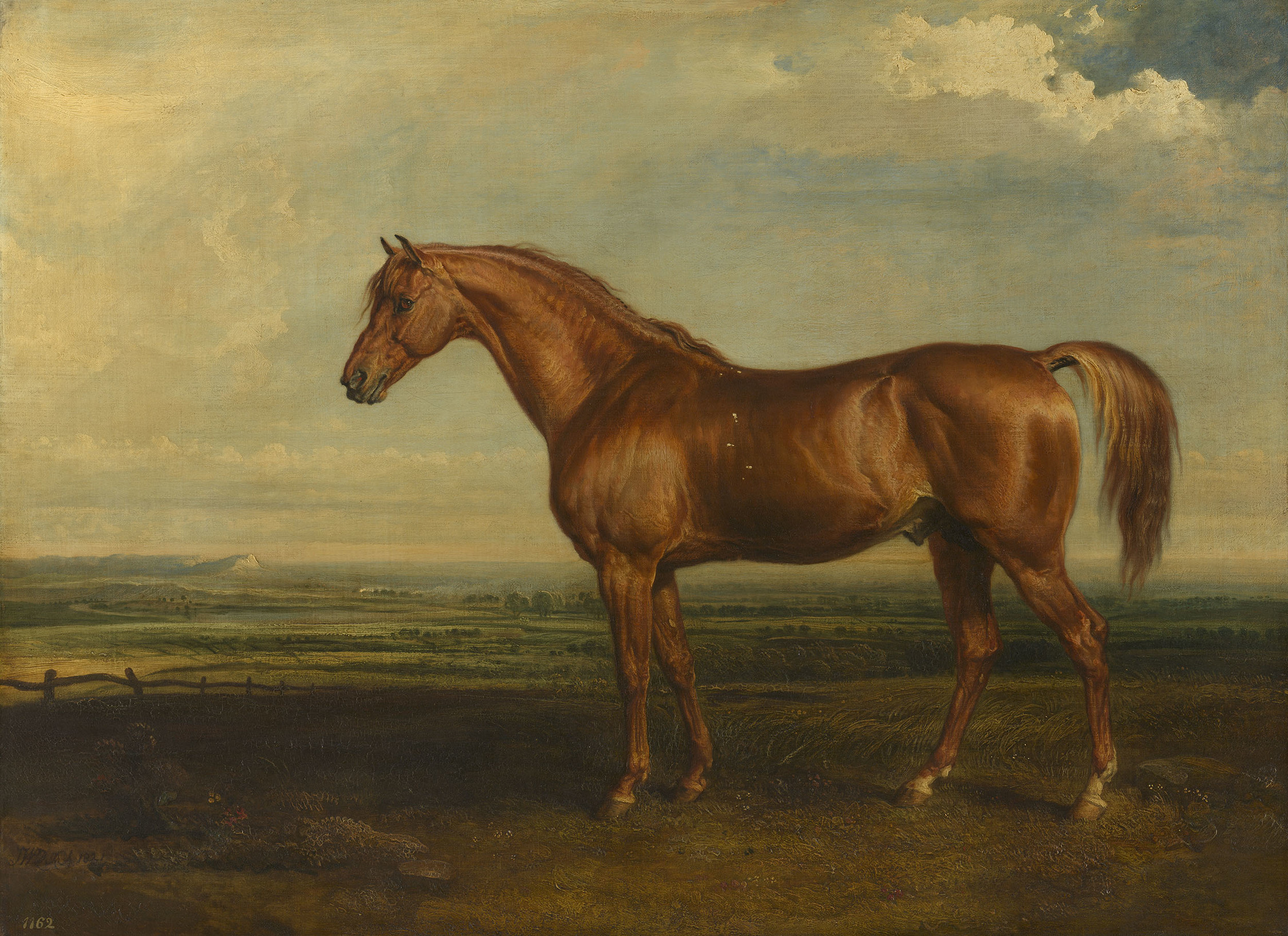
Soothsayer by James Ward

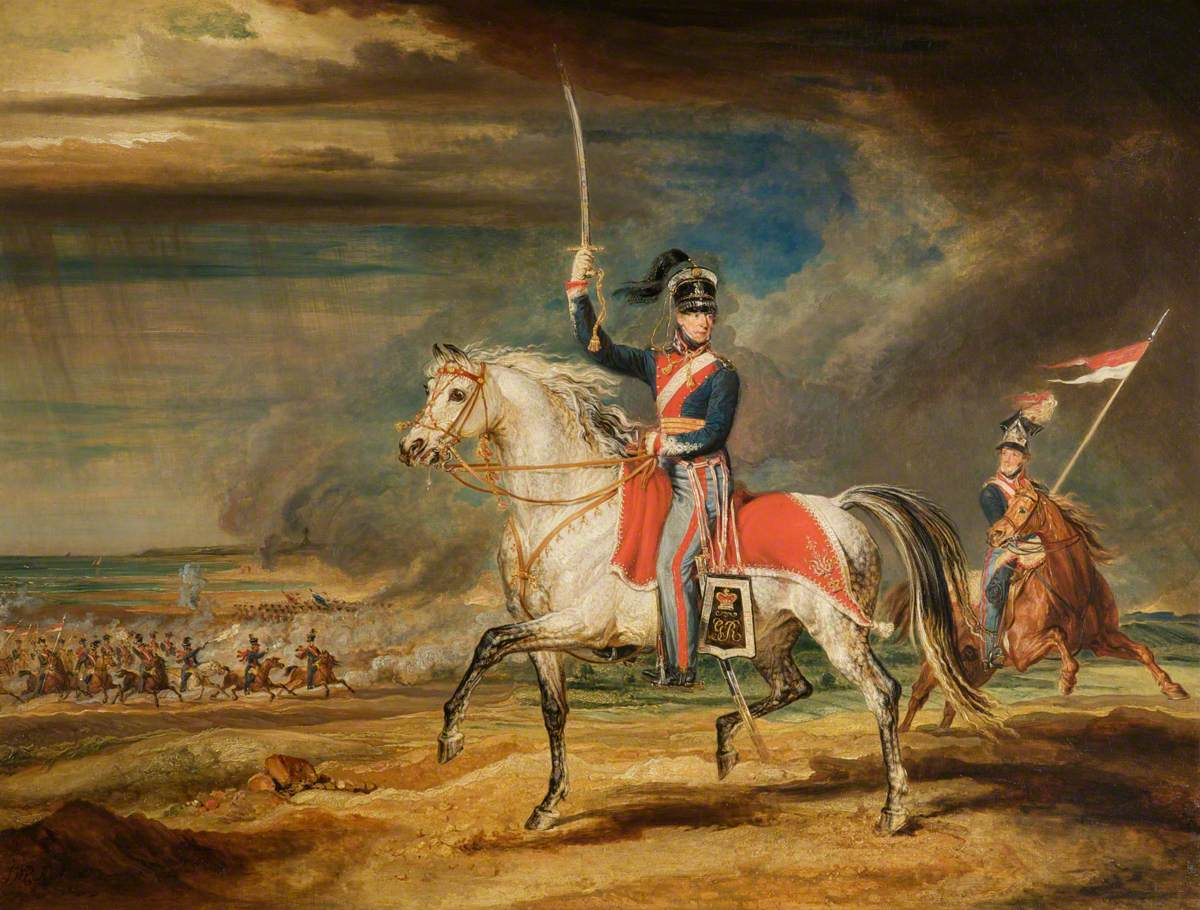
Sir John Leicester Exercising His Regiment of Cheshire Yeomanry on the Sands at Liverpool by James Ward

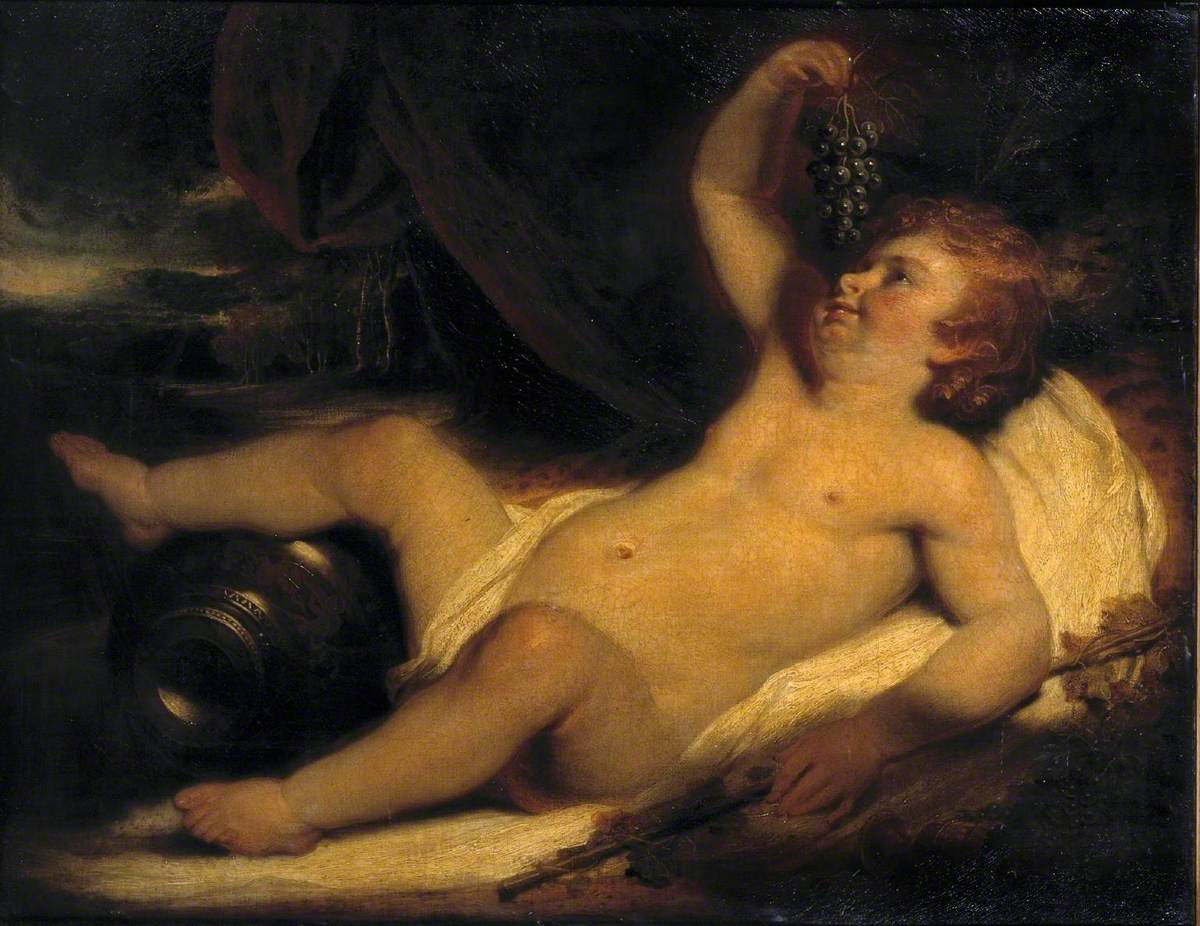
A Young Bacchus by Martin Archer Shee

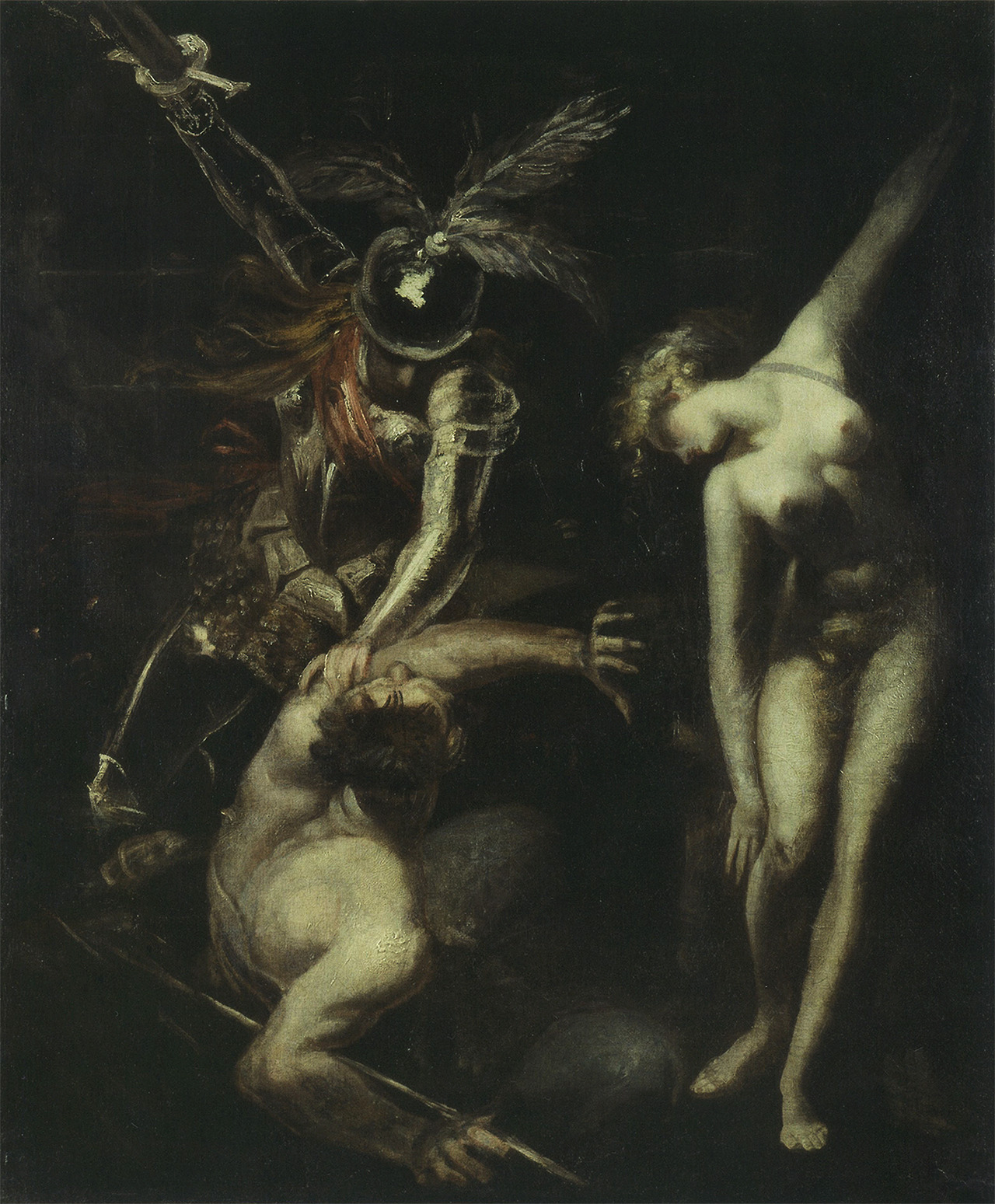
Britomart Delivering Amoretta from the Enchantment of Busirane by Henry Fuseli

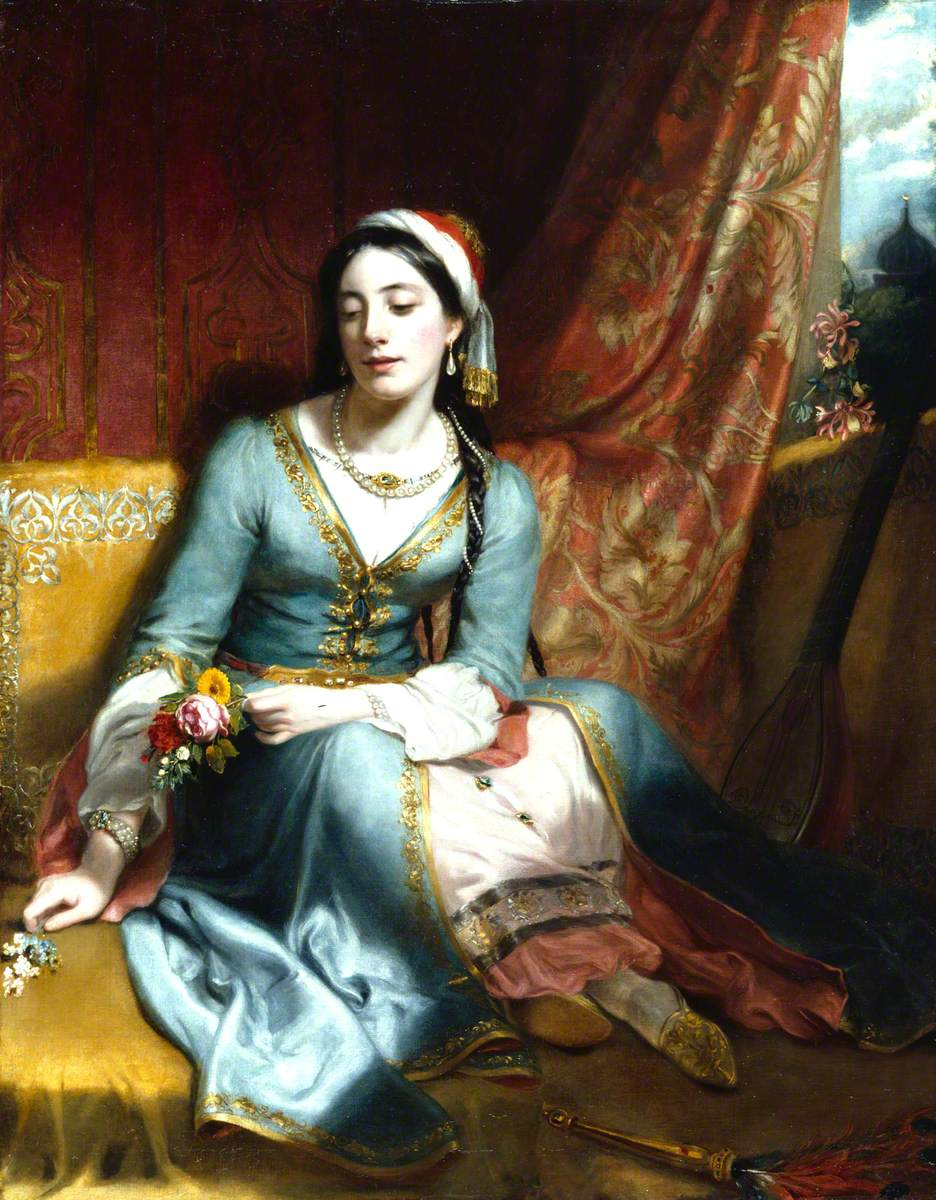
The Oriental Love Letter by Henry William Pickersgill

Portrait of Lady Belgrave by Henry William Pickersgill

Mrs William Wilberforce and Child by John Linnell

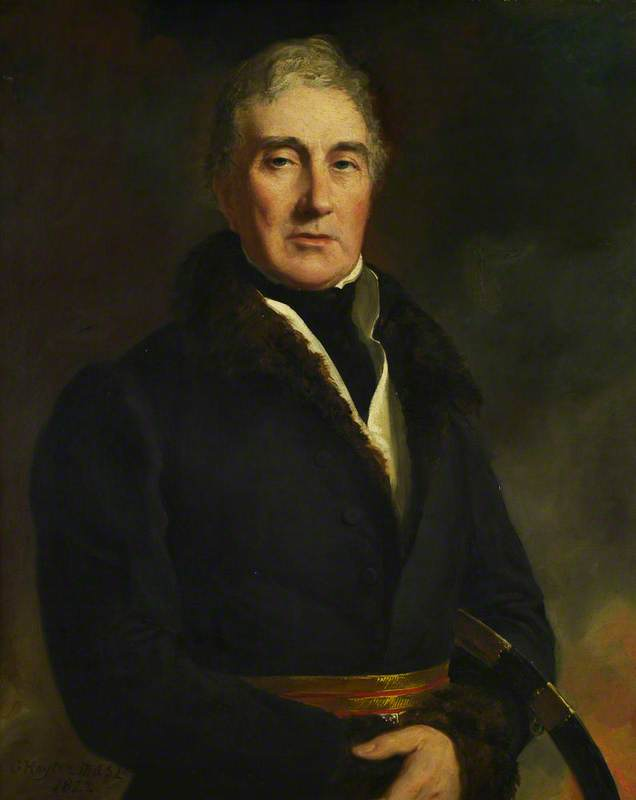
Portrait of Thomas Graham by George Hayter

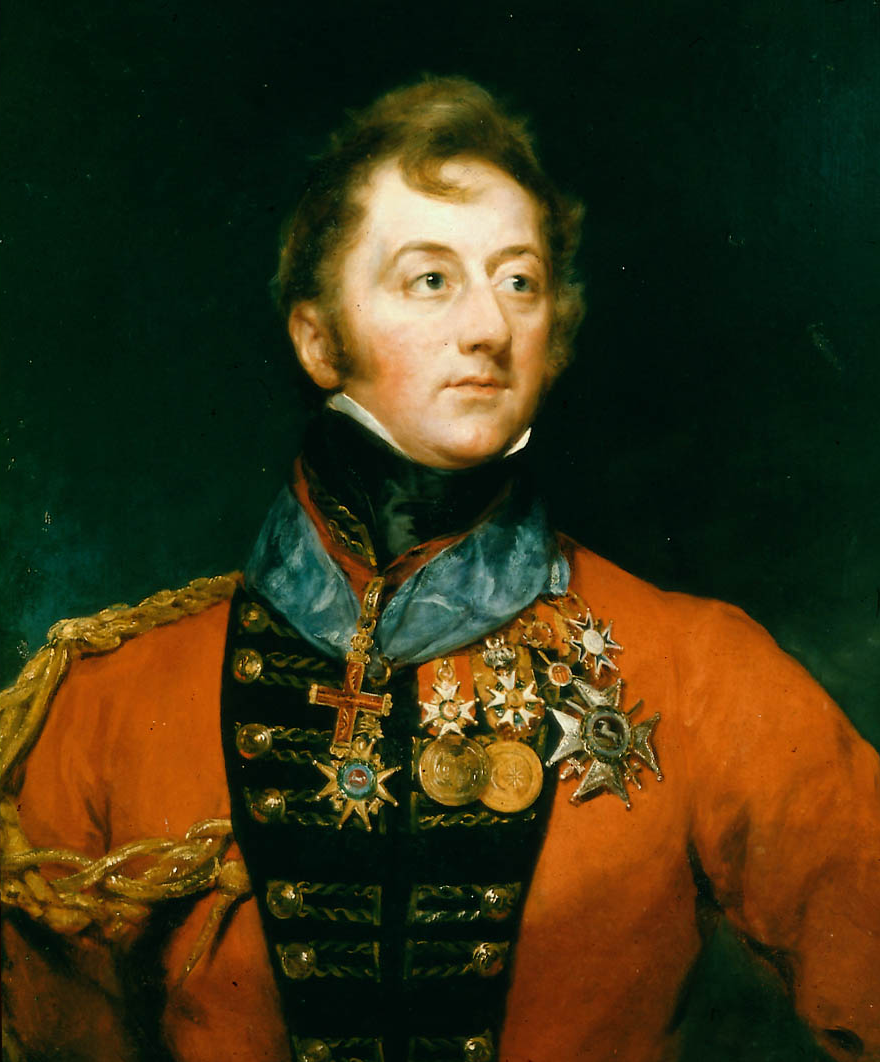
Portrait of Charles William Doyle by Margaret Sarah Carpenter

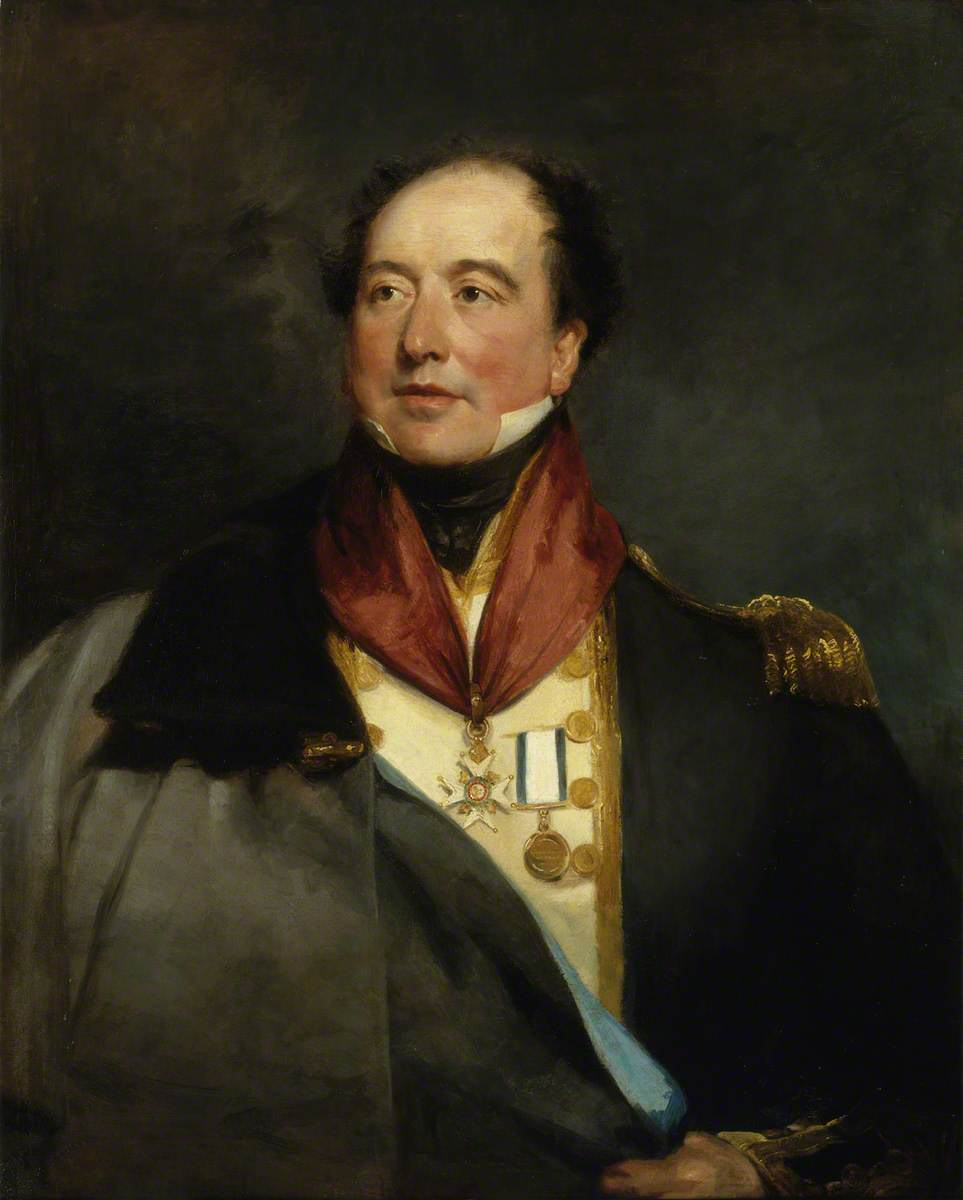
Portrait of Christopher Cole by Margaret Sarah Carpenter

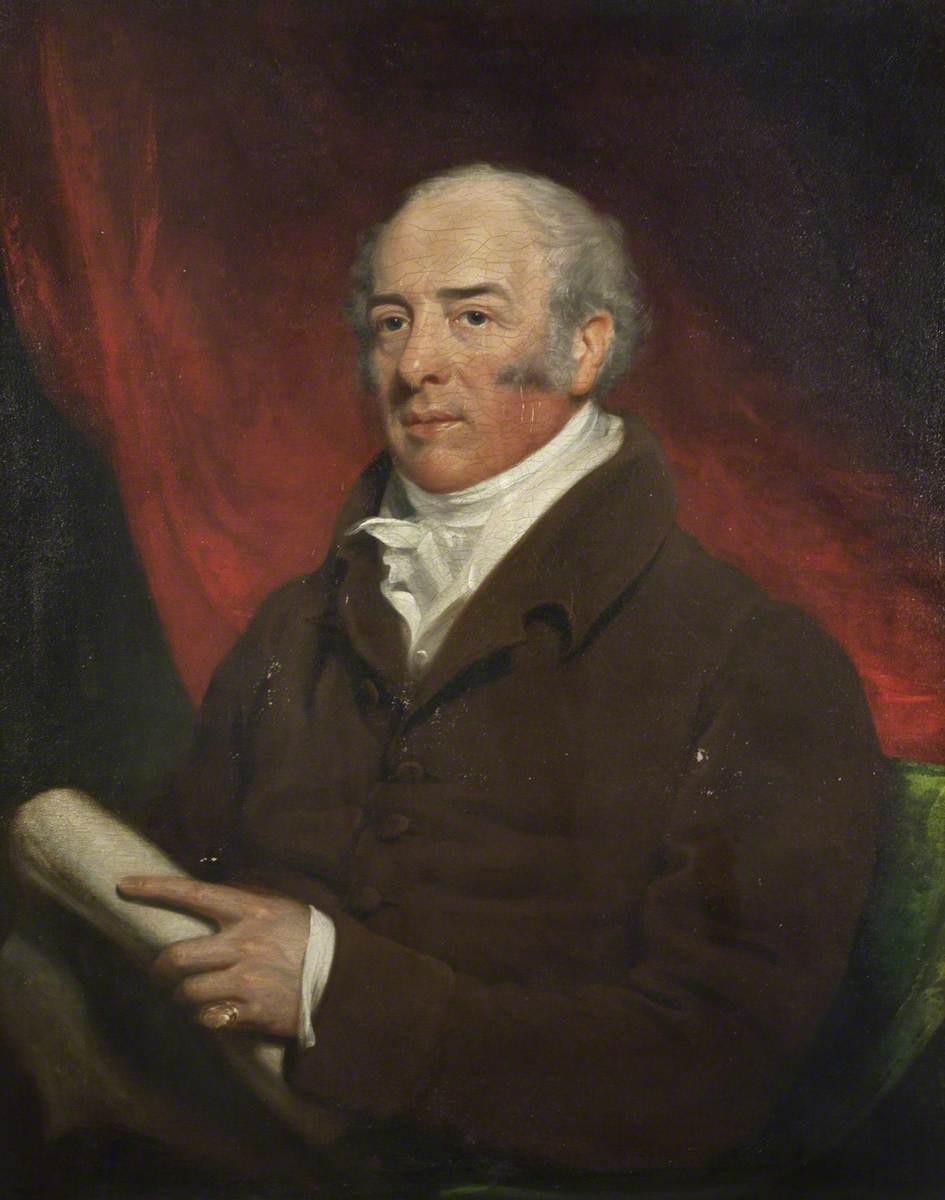
Portrait of William Johnstone Hope by James Ramsay

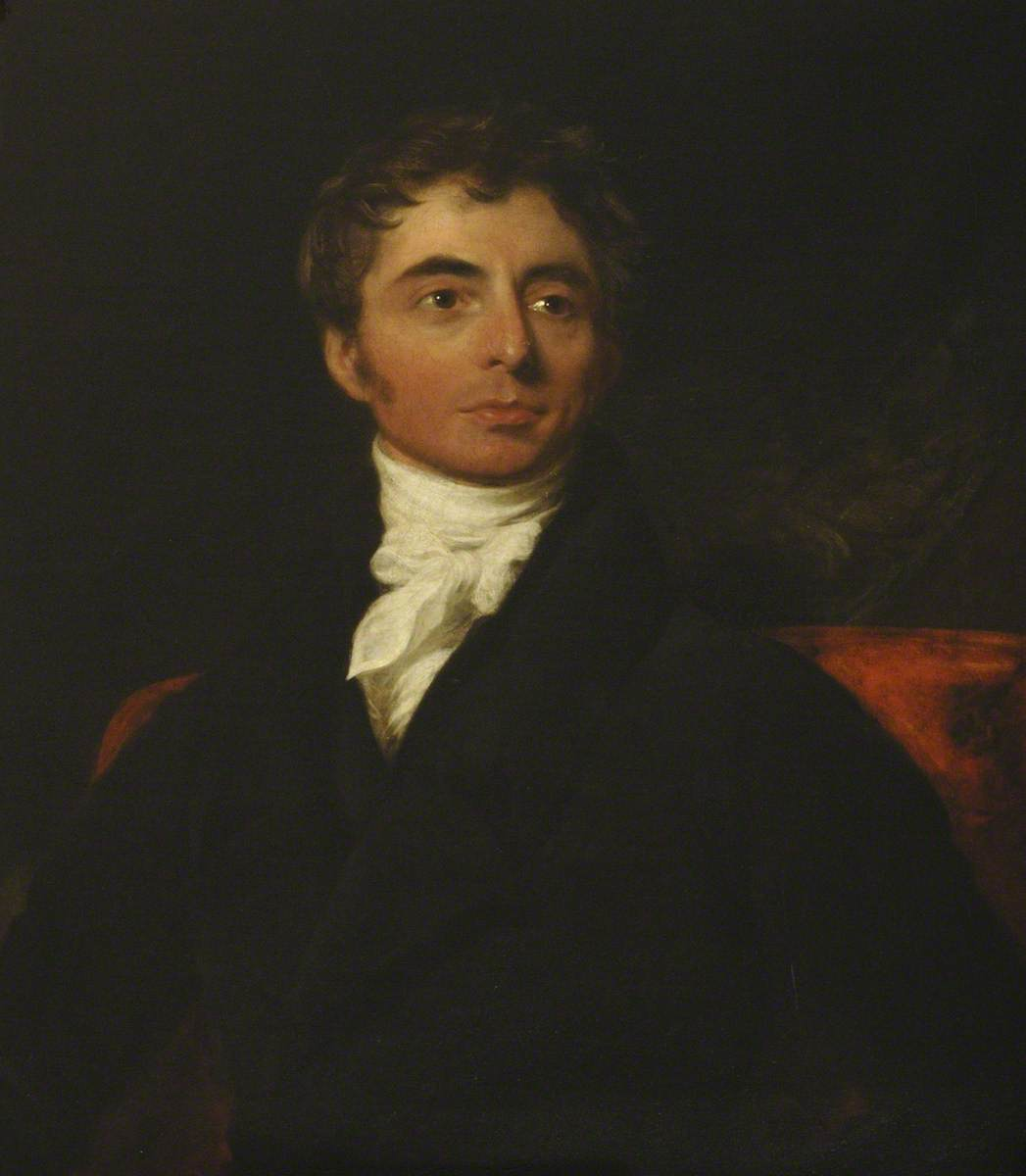
Portrait of Robert Southey by Samuel Lane

== Bibliography ==
- Albinson, Cassandra, Funnell, Peter & Peltz, Lucy. Thomas Lawrence: Regency Power and Brilliance. Yale University Press, 2010.
- Carter, Julia. Bristol Museum and Art Gallery: Guide to the Art Collection. Bristol Books, 2017.
- Levey, Michael. Sir Thomas Lawrence. Yale University Press, 2005.
- Robinson, Leonard. William Etty: The Life and Art. McFarland, 2007.
- Tromans, Nicholas. David Wilkie: The People's Painter. Edinburgh University Press, 2007.
