= The Stage Coach Breakfast =

Painting by Edward Villiers Rippingille

The Stage Coach Party
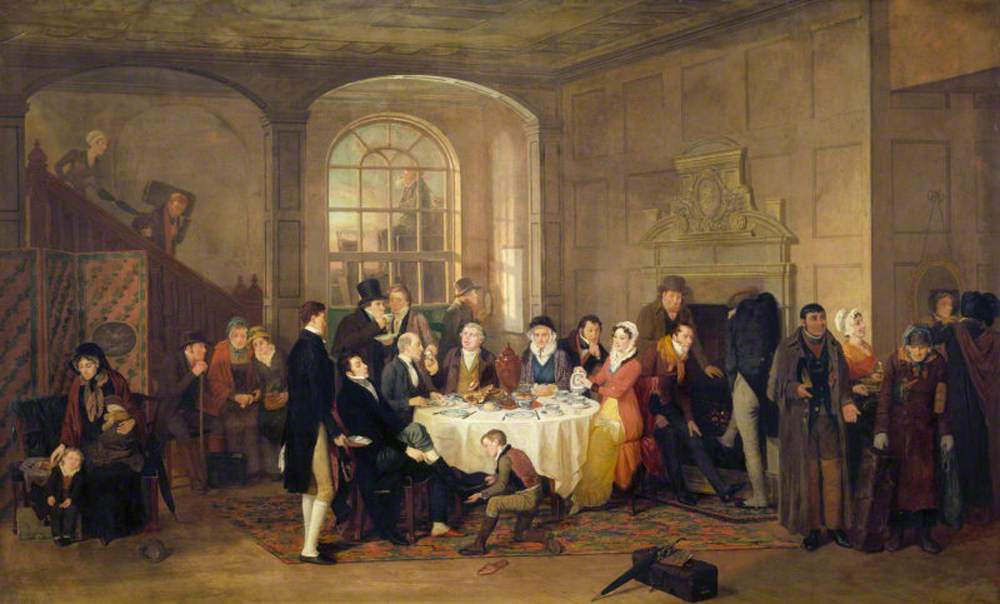
- Artist: Edward Villiers Rippingille
- Year: 1824
- Type: Oil on panel, genre painting
- Dimensions: 82.2 cm × 133.7 cm (32.4 in × 52.6 in)
- Location: Clevedon Court, Somerset

The Stage Coach Breakfast is an 1824 oil painting by the British artist Edward Villiers Rippingille. A conversation piece, it portrays a scene in a coaching inn, mixing celebrated writers known for their contributions to The London Magazine such as William Wordsworth and Samuel Taylor Coleridge and members of the family of Charles Abraham Elton. Others included in the painting are Dorothy Wordsworth, Robert Southey and Charles Lamb. Rippingille, a member of the Bristol School, became known for his genre works of everyday life. The painting was displayed at the Royal Academy's Summer Exhibition of 1824 at Somerset House in London. Today it is in the collection of the National Trust at Clevedon Court in Somerset.

== Bibliography ==
- Biggers, Shirley Hoover. British Author House Museums and Other Memorials: A Guide to Sites in England, Ireland, Scotland and Wales. McFarland, 2015.
- Greenacre, Francis. The Bristol School of Artists: Francis Danby and Painting in Bristol, 1810-1840. City Art Gallery, 1973.
- Paley, Morton D. Portraits of Coleridge. Clarendon Press, 1999.
