= Montgomery Plaza =

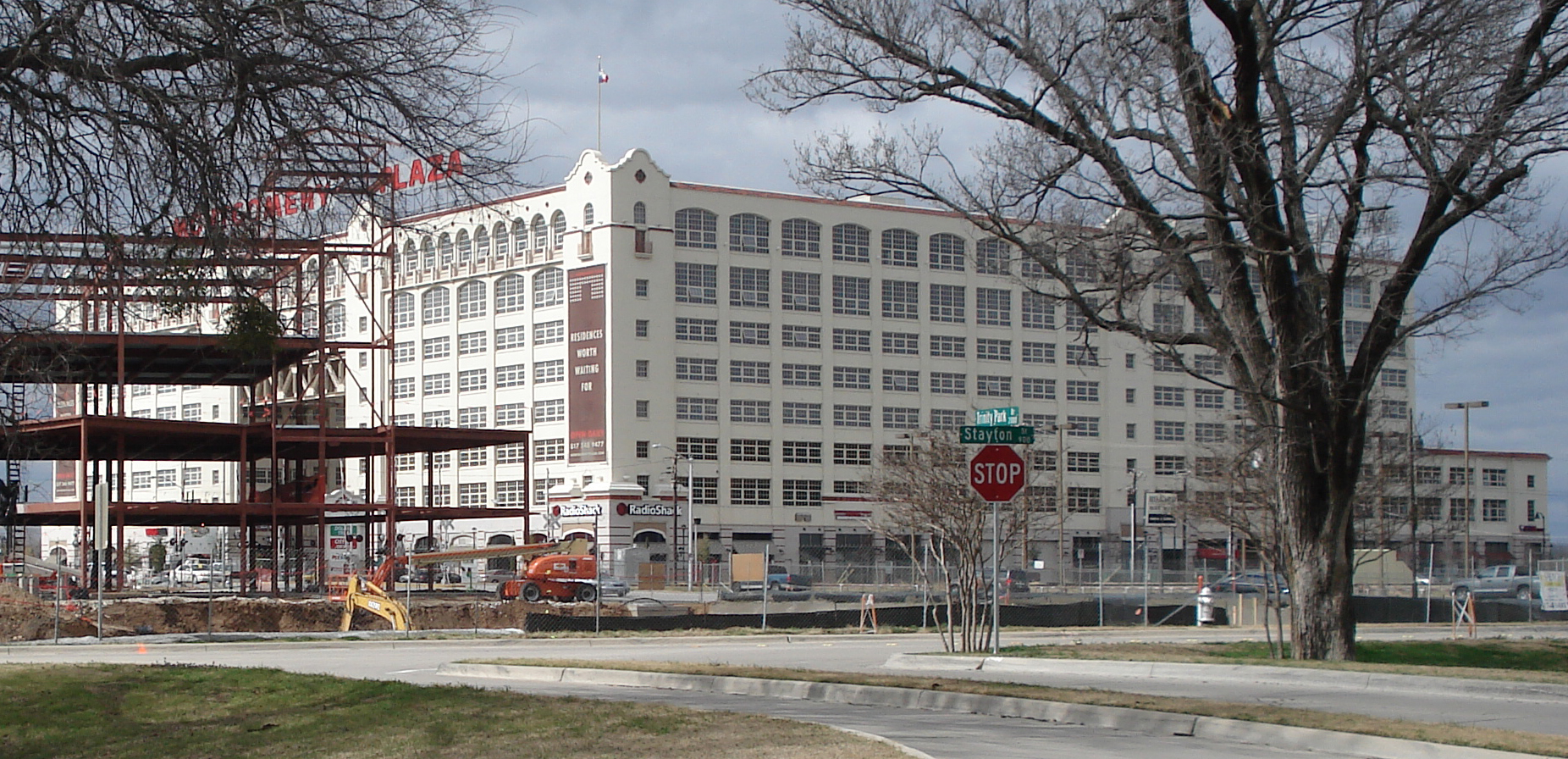
- Location: Fort Worth, Texas, United States
- Coordinates: 32.7519°N 97.3533°W
- Address: 2600 W 7th St
- Opened: 2005
- Developer: Weber & Company
- Owner: Weber & Company
- Floors: 1
- Website: www.montgomeryplaza.com

Montgomery Plaza is a shopping mall and luxury condominium project located on W. 7th Street just west of downtown Fort Worth, Texas, United States near West 7th Fort Worth.

== History ==
=== Construction ===
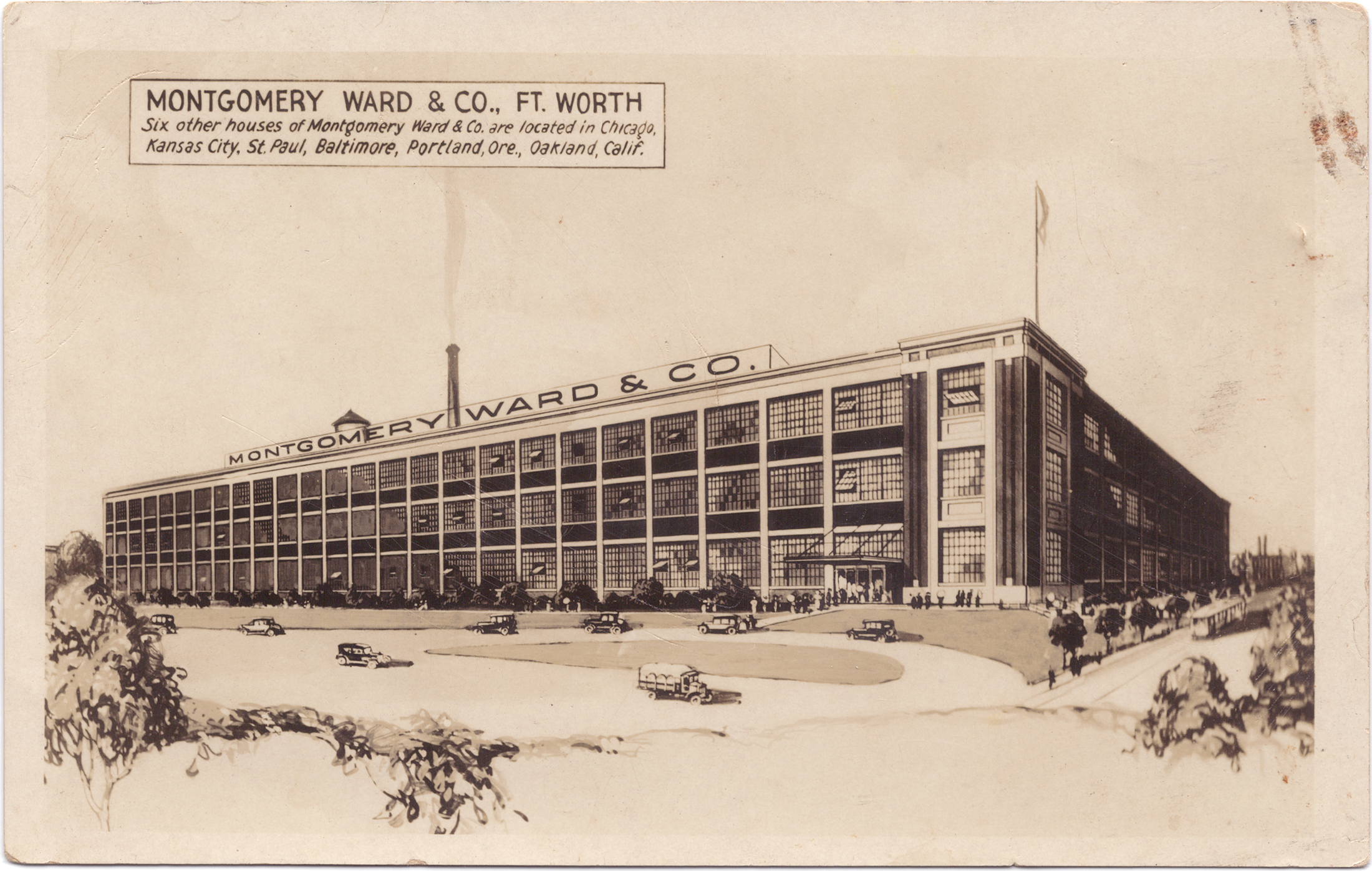
Postcard of the Montgomery Ward & Company building, undated

In 1928, Montgomery Ward located its regional retail and mail order warehouse on West 7th Street, just across the Trinity River from Downtown Fort Worth. This was one of nine regional centers constructed in the U.S. between 1926 and 1929. The building was constructed in 1928 by Thos. S. Byrne, Ltd. as a major regional retail and mail order warehouse for the retail company Montgomery Ward. The building originally allowed for trains to come in between its two towers to be unloaded. The original front façade finished the creation of an eight-story U-shaped structure.

Construction consisted of reinforced concrete with 20’ centered columns throughout. In some areas, wing additions were built only two or three stories high but designed to have five more floors added at a future date. This massive construction survived flood waters that reached its second floor in 1949 and the 2000 Fort Worth Tornado. In 2001 Montgomery Ward went out of business and closed down the warehouse thus leaving the property vacant. Kimco purchased the property and with Weber & Co, demolished the distribution center that was constructed in the 1960s to the rear of the warehouse to make way for a Super Target and other anchors.

=== Redevelopment ===
Redevelopment began in 2004 by Weber & Co and KIMCO Realty, with the addition of retail space surrounding the original 1928 building to the rear. The name Montgomery Plaza was given to the development. The original mission revival warehouse character of the Montgomery Ward building itself was preserved during an extensive renovation. A six-story hole was carved out through the center front façade of the original store creating Montgomery Plaza's distinctive M-shaped profile and opening up an 80-foot brick-paved promenade with outdoor dining and shopping which has strings of incandescent light bulbs above and vehicle parking to the sides. The eight-story warehouse now contains retail on the bottom floor with residential above. Floors three through eight were separately converted into 240 luxury for-sale condominiums with 47 different floor plans, by developer Marquis Group. The seventh and eighth floors and original connecting corridors remain above the new opening, to create a bridge between the two sides of the building. The Super Target opened in 2005 and the retail section of the bottom floor of the 1928 warehouse opened in 2006. The residences were completed and opened for sale starting in 2007.

The architectural approach for the new development focused on preserving the building's Art Deco period roots. The unique exterior is balanced with an interior design that takes maximum advantage of ceiling heights up to 16 feet, enormous window areas and "industrial-grade" solidity of this unique building. The original contractor who built the building in 1928, Thos. S. Byrne, was again the general contractor of record the warehouse redevelopment project, performing the general construction of the condominium residences including interior finish-out, the bridge, and the residential amenities. Montgomery Plaza features a unique outdoor resort-style rooftop amenity deck (the largest in Texas, at nearly one acre), featuring swimming and reflecting pools, cabanas and outdoor fire pits. Parking for the residences is integrated into a built in parking garage located inside the original warehouse building.

== Tenants ==
Montgomery Plaza includes large department stores and smaller retail stores. It has chain stores and locally owned shops. Some larger anchor tenants include Super Target, Marshalls, Ross Stores, Famous Footwear, Office Depot, Chick-fil-A, PetSmart and Pier 1 Imports. Retail spaces occupied by well-known chains include RE/MAX, Subway, GNC, Starbucks, AT&T, and Pei Wei. Montgomery Plaza has other locally owned tenants as well. A Wells Fargo location sits on the premises of the building.

== Location ==
Montgomery Plaza fronts West 7th Street, which connects Fort Worth's Cultural District with the downtown area. The area includes a wide variety of dining, nightlife and residential options. Most recently, The Lancaster Luxury Apartments in Fort Worth opened in the West 7th Street District. West 7th and the Cultural District offer entertainment options to the growing defense and technology workforce in Fort Worth.

A few blocks west is Fort Worth's Cultural District - the third largest in the United States, encompassing the Will Rogers Memorial Center; the Modern Art Museum of Fort Worth, designed by Tadao Ando; the Amon Carter Museum of American Art; and the Kimbell Art Museum, designed by Louis Kahn.

== See also ==
- List of shopping malls in Dallas, Texas
