= The Temptation of Saint Anthony (Schongauer) =

Engraving by Martin Schongauer

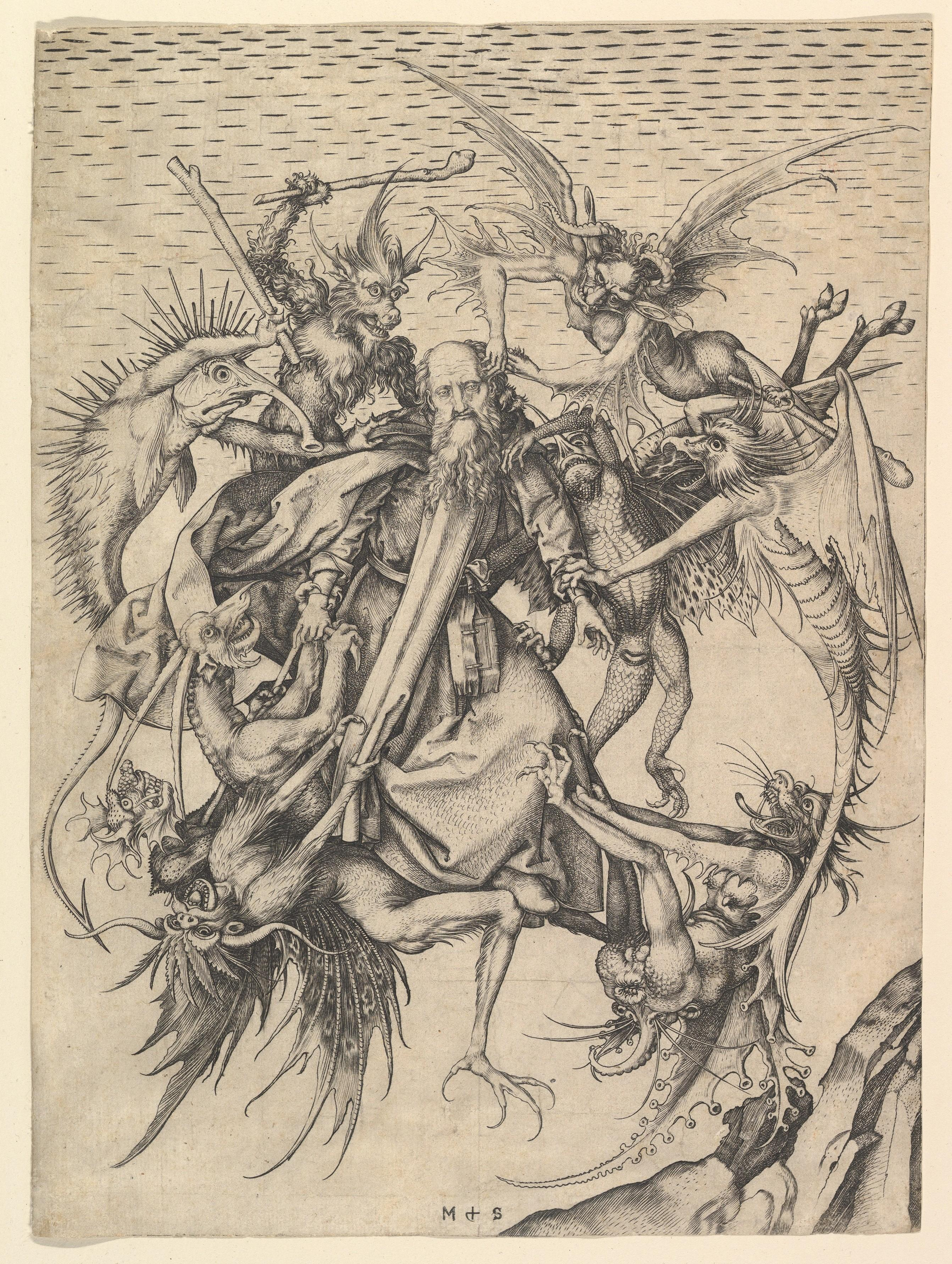
The Temptation of Saint Anthony, engraving by Martin Schongauer, c. 1470–1475

The Temptation of Saint Anthony is an engraving by Martin Schongauer, probably created c. 1470–1475, depicting a popular scene in 15th-century art. In it, grotesque demons swarm around Saint Anthony the Great, bursting with movement and energy as the saint calmly resists their temptations or blows. The saint is shown with some of his characteristic attributes, dressed in a monk's habit and cowl, carrying a staff with a tau-shaped handle and with a bound girdle book hanging from his belt. The literary source from which this image derives is debated. The image could depict chapter 65 from Athanasius's Life of Saint Anthony, where the hermit has a vision of himself floating through the air and undefined beings prevent him from ascending back to reality, or it could show the ninth chapter of the same Life, in which Saint Anthony is attacked by the devil in the form of animals and beasts in the Egyptian desert and is levitated in the air by his practice of rigorous asceticism.

== Technique ==
In The Temptation of Saint Anthony, Schongauer's engraving technique forms the image from dots, lines and areas of hatching, varying spaces between them in order to enhance the interaction of white and black. The engraving exists in two states, with only minor details added to the second. Parallel and fine cross hatching can be seen in the hermit's drapery and in the texture of the devils. Contour hatching can also be seen in the drapery of the monk, as well as on the battered crags in the right-hand corner. Tick hatching is seen in the sky, which indicates the atmosphere.

The vast amount of negative space in the background accentuates Saint Anthony's vulnerability, while the curving and horizontal lines of the devils add energy and movement. The grotesque devils are illustrated with a mixture of body parts from different animals. Schongauer's mastery of texture is shown by giving the viewer a sense of how each beast would feel, ranging from the roughness of the scales to the soft hairiness of the fur. The heavily worked foreground is balanced by progressively more isolated lines in the background, showing Schongauer's control of light.

== Literary source ==
The Temptation of Saint Anthony depicts no real landscape besides a battered crag in the right-hand corner, leaving room for debate on what exact moment in the saint's life this scene depicts. Some scholars believe the scene depicts chapter 65 of Athanasius's Life of Saint Anthony, their primary argument being that the attack takes place in the air which parallels with Saint Anthony's description of ecstasy in this chapter. Chapter 65 tells the tale of when Saint Anthony was about to eat dinner and suddenly felt himself carried off as if he was outside of his body. Undefined beings stood in his way, preventing him from ascending, and "as his guides offered resistance, the others demanded on what plea he was not accountable to them ... Then as they brought accusations but could not prove them, the way was opened up to him free and unhindered and presently he saw himself approaching so it seemed to him and halting with himself and so he was the real Anthony again." This chapter emphasizes the difference between good and bad spirits, then goes on to discuss the devil and how many battles one must pass through the air in order to achieve celestial ascent.

Michelangelo, The Torment of Saint Anthony, c. 1487, Kimbell Art Museum

Some scholars argue the image instead depicts chapter nine of Athanasius's Life of Saint Anthony. In chapter nine Athanasius records that the saint was living in a cave in Egypt when the devil attacked him and left him half-dead. A friend found him and helped him recover, and once Saint Anthony had regained consciousness he asked to be sent back to fight these demons, who took the shape of animals and beasts. The British Museum, which owns a copy of the print, describes the hermit's ascent: "the rigorous asceticism practised by St Anthony in the Egyptian desert allowed him to levitate in the air, where he was attacked by devils trying to beat him to the ground", and soon afterwards the creatures were driven away by the apparitions of Christ. Texts that describe the attack provide few descriptive details, leaving room for artistic expression. In the Golden Legend, Jacobus de Voragine describes the devils as animals that attacked the saint with horns, claws and teeth.

== Schongauer's monogram ==
Schongauer was the first artist to sign all his prints with a monogram. In The Temptation of Saint Anthony one can identify the date of the print by Schongauer's monogram. The image is one of the artist's early works. In his first ten prints his monogram is characterized by the M having vertical shanks, as opposed to the oblique shanks which appear in the rest of his prints afterwards. The S in his earlier works is much thicker around the curves and finishes in diagonal strokes similar to Roman capitals. This trait is seen in more than his first ten works, but seems to decrease in his later works. It is hypothesized that Schongauer used a stamp in his first ten engravings, which he later lost, and so he began hand-writing his monogram thereafter.

== Legacy ==
This etching inspired many artists after Schongauer including Michelangelo, who as a boy painted a copy of the engraving, according to Giorgio Vasari. The Torment of Saint Anthony is a copy of the engraving currently in the collection of the Kimbell Art Museum and is attributed to Michelangelo. It's authorship is however, disputed.

In addition, this engraving has served as inspiration for later paintings on the same subject, such as The Temptation of Saint Anthony by Jan Brueghel the Elder, in which the same scene is shown in the upper right.

== Collections ==
The prints can be found in the collections of the Metropolitan Museum of Art, the Art Institute of Chicago, and the Rhode Island School of Design Museum, among others. For a more complete list of known impressions of this engraving, see the Schongauer catalogue originally by Max Lehrs.

== Sources ==
- Karp, Diane (1984). "Madness, Mania, Melancholy: The Artist as Observer". Philadelphia Museum of Art Bulletin. 80 (342): 1–24. doi:10.2307/3795418. JSTOR 3795418.
- "Katharina von Siena, Heinrich Seuse, Martin Schongauer und die Bilder der Observanzbewegung in der polnischen Dominikanerprovinz - OpenBibArt". www.openbibart.fr. Archived from the original on 25 February 2018.
- AP Art History. Barron's Educational Series. 2008. p. 247. ISBN 9781438080536. "Saint Anthony Tormented by Demons Martin Schongauer."
- Kleiner (1 February 2008). Gardner's Art Through the Ages: V. 2: A Global History. Cengage Learning EMEA. ISBN 978-0495410607.
- Lewis, Richard L.; Lewis, Susan Ingalls (23 January 2008). Cengage Advantage Books: The Power of Art. Cengage Learning. ISBN 978-0534641030.
