= Henry Voordecker =

Belgian painter (1779–1861)

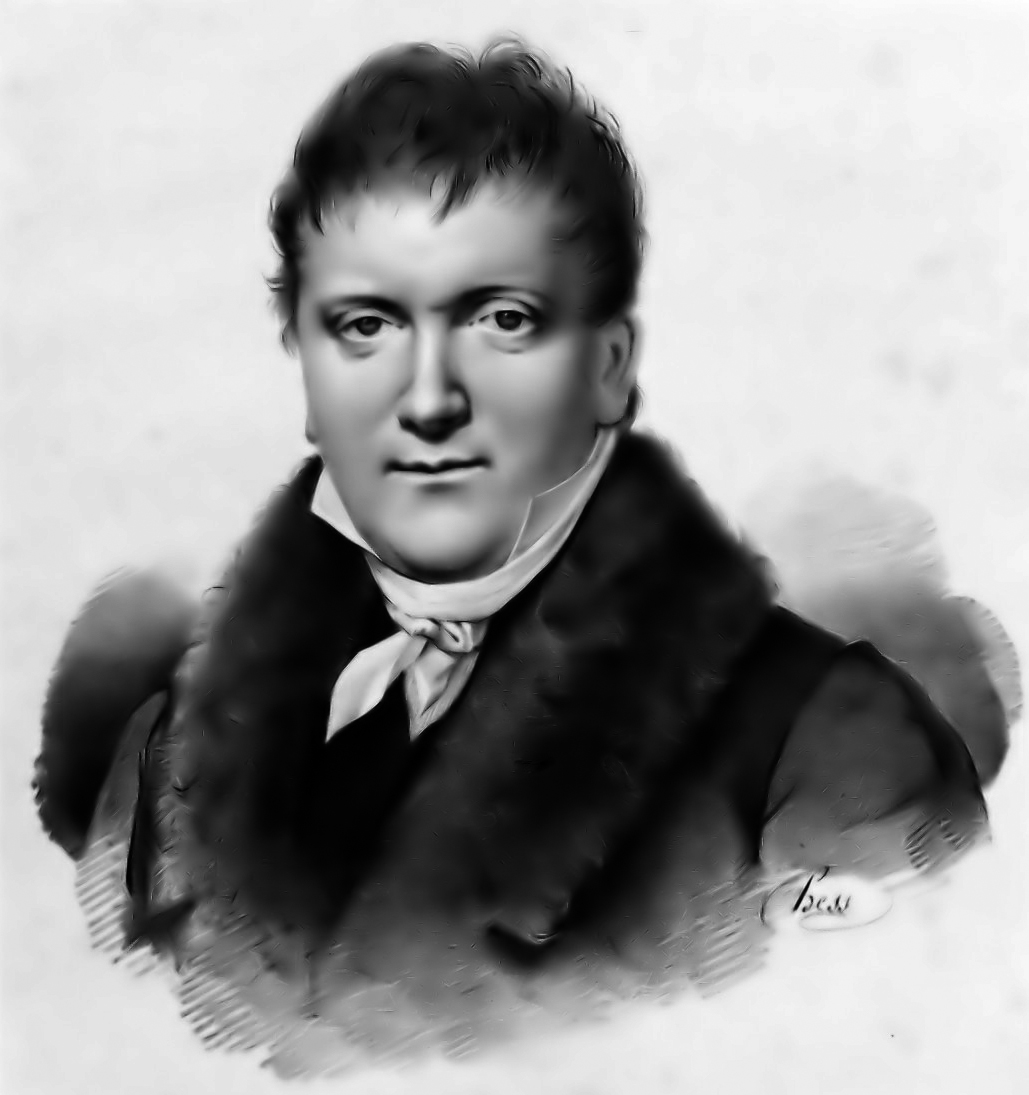
- Henri Voordecker, 1826
- Born: 24 August 1779; Brussels, Austrian Netherlands
- Died: 3 December 1861 (aged 82); Brussels, Belgium
- Occupation: painter

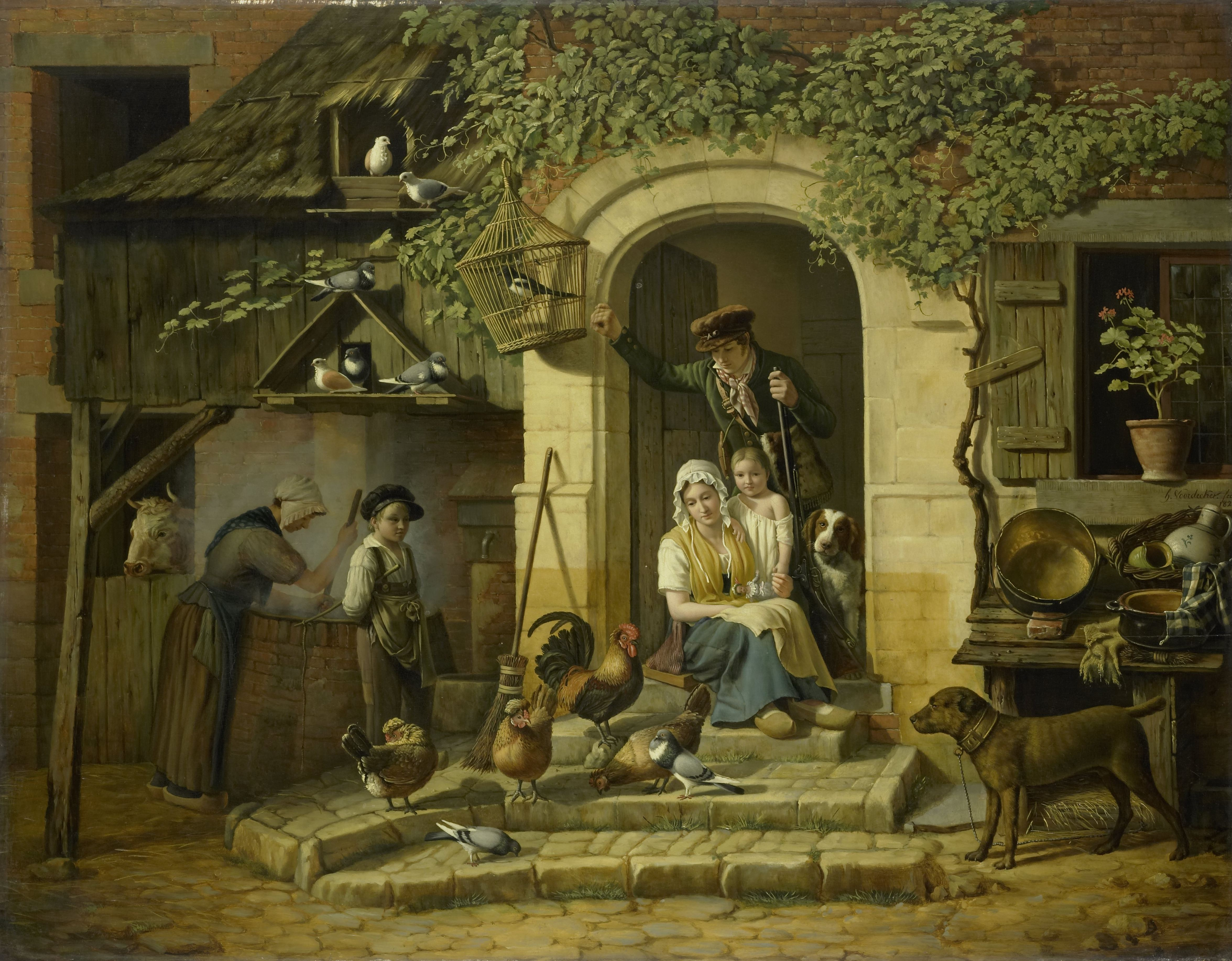
Hunter's Home, 1826, Rijksmuseum, Amsterdam

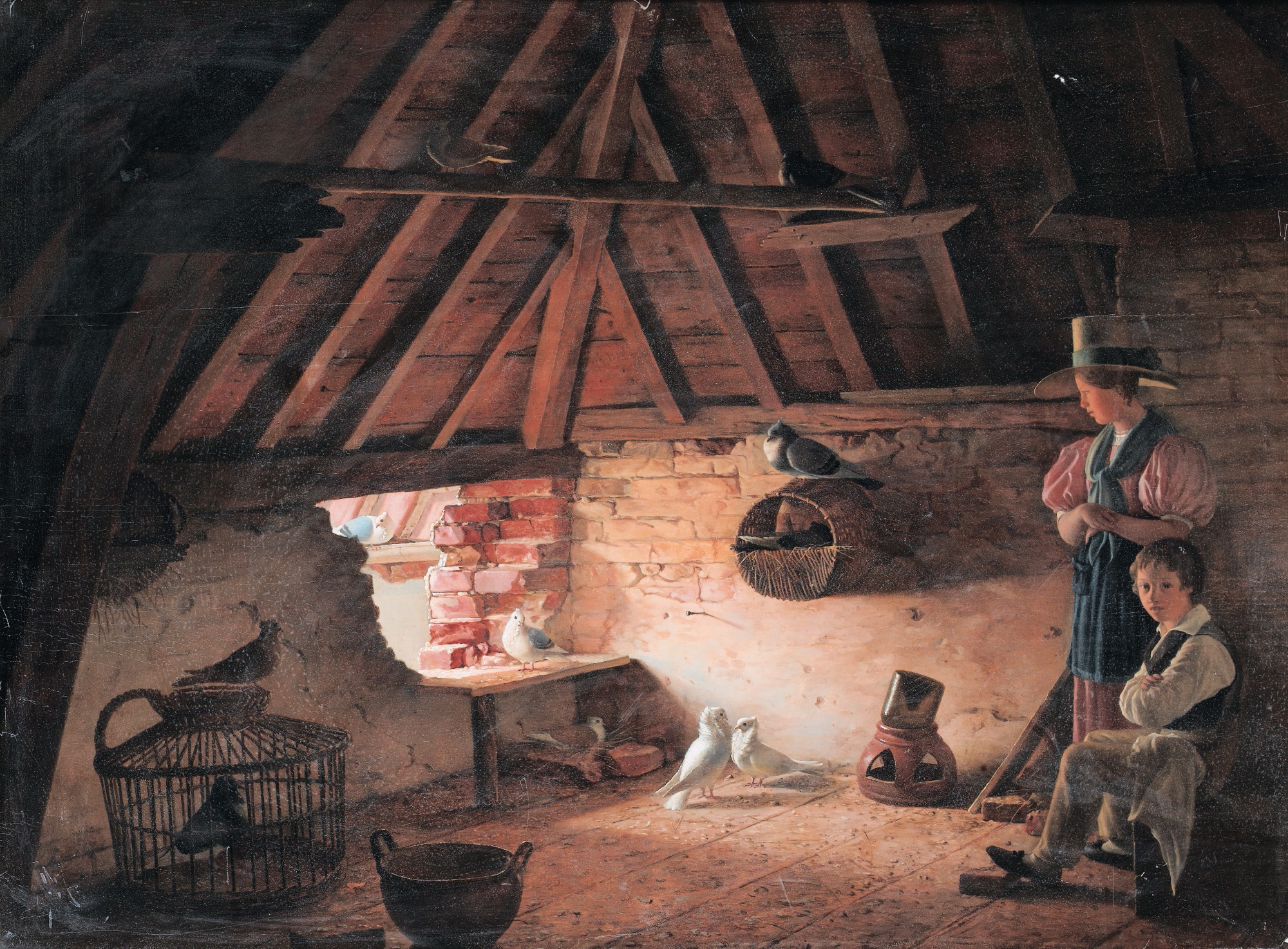
In the Dovecot, 1833

Henri, Hendrik, or Henry Voordecker (24 August 1779, Brussels – 3 December 1861, Brussels) was a Belgian painter of genre scenes, especially of birds such as pigeons – his most notable works include Hunter's Home. By late in his career he was regarded as perhaps the most distinguished painter in Brussels, and was also successful in Britain.

He specialized in genre scenes from the beginning of his career, landscapes and animal scenes; in the latter genre predominantly pigeons and poultry. Voordecker painted in the romantic style, at once charming and commercial. As Voordecker's art was in sympathy with the spirit of the age, his success with an audience of wealthy citizens was assured. King William I bought a panel by him in 1820.

Collections with his works include the Rijksmuseum in Amsterdam, the Royal Museums of Fine Arts of Belgium in Brussels, and the Belgian as well as the British Royal Collection. A scene with eight pigeons was given by Queen Victoria to her husband Albert, Prince Consort on his birthday in 1841.

== Career ==
Voordecker studied with Jean-Baptiste Le Roy, who was a Brussels counterpart of the Antwerp animal painter Balthasar Paul Ommeganck, and knew Jacques-Louis David, who lived in exile in Brussel after 1816. According to Philippe Bordes, Voordecker may have collaborated with David to paint the figure of Agamemnon in the 1819 version of the painting The Rage of Achilles, now in the Kimbell Art Museum, at Fort Worth in Texas). Some of their correspondence survives and is a useful source for David's later life.

== Family ==
The son of Pierre Voordecker and Agnes Rega, Henri Voordecker married Marie Jeanne Guldentops. They had a son, François, and a daughter, Louise; both became artists. Louise was the art teacher at the court of King Leopold I and painted mostly fruit and flowers. François Voordecker was a genre painter and portraitist.

== Literature ==
- Pieter J.J. van Thiel, c.s. All the Paintings of the Rijksmuseum in Amsterdam, Amsterdam, 1976.
- W.G. Flippo, Lexicon of the Belgian Romantic Painters. Antwerpen. 1981.
- P. en V. Berko, Dictionnaire des peintres belges nés entre 1750 et 1875, Brussel-Knokke, 1981.
- (in Dutch) N. Hostyn, Van de os op de ezel. Belgische dierenschilders in de 19de eeuw. (tentoonstellingscat.) Brussel 1982.
- (in Dutch) Kon. Musea voor Schone Kunsten van België. Departement Moderne kunst. Inventaris-catalogus van de moderne schilderkunst. Brussel, 1984.
- (in Dutch) N. Hostyn, "Henri Voordecker", in: Nationaal Biografisch Woordenboek, 13, Brussel, 1990.
- (in French) Les Salons retrouvés. Éclat de la vie artistique dans la France du Nord 1815–1848, s.l., (1993).
