= The Geography Lesson =

Painting by Louis-Léopold Boilly

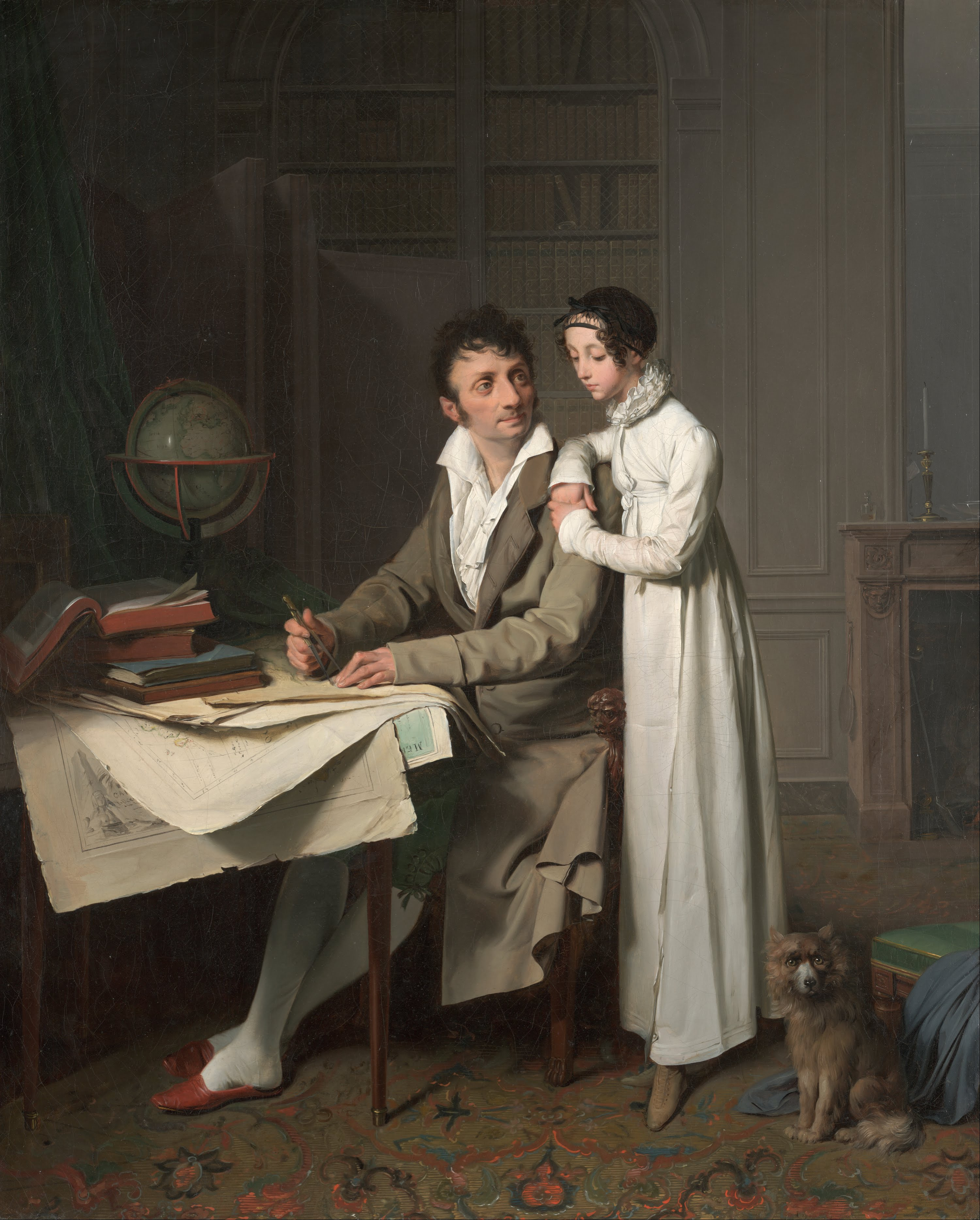
- Artist: Louis-Léopold Boilly
- Year: 1812
- Type: Oil on canvas, genre painting
- Dimensions: 73.6 cm × 59 cm (29.0 in × 23 in)
- Location: Kimbell Art Museum, Fort Worth, Texas

The Geography Lesson is an 1812 oil painting by the French artist Louis-Léopold Boilly. It blends the genre painting and portrait painting. It depicts Monsieur Guadry, a friend of Boilly, instructing his daughter in geography during the Napoleonic era. It appeared at the Salon of 1812 and again at the Salon of 1814 at the Louvre. Today it is in the collection of the Kimbell Art Museum in Fort Worth in Texas, having been acquired in 1990.

== Bibliography ==
- Housefield, James. Playing with Earth and Sky: Astronomy, Geography, and the Art of Marcel Duchamp. Dartmouth College Press, 2016.
- Oppenheimer, Margaret J. The French Portrait: Revolution to Restoration. Smith College Museum of Art, 2005.
- Whitlum-Cooper, Francesca. Boilly: Scenes of Parisian Life. National Gallery Company, 2019.
- Withers, Charles W.J. Geography, Science and National Identity: Scotland Since 1520. Cambridge University Press, 2001.
