= The Torment of Saint Anthony =

1480s painting by Michelangelo

The Temptation of Saint Anthony
- Artist: Michelangelo
- Year: c. 1487–1488
- Type: oil and tempera on panel
- Dimensions: 47 cm × 35 cm (18 1/2 in × 13 3/4 in)
- Location: Kimbell Art Museum

The Torment of Saint Anthony (or The Temptation of Saint Anthony) is a painting attributed to Michelangelo, though his authorship is disputed. If it is by Michelangelo, it is his earliest surviving work, having been produced in c. 1487–88 when he was 12-13 years old. It is in the collection of Kimbell Art Museum in Fort Worth, Texas.

The painting is an oil and tempera copy of an engraving by Martin Schongauer, which was produced several years earlier. It depicts Saint Anthony (AD 251–356) being assailed in the desert by demons, whose temptations he is resisting.

The Temptation (or Trial) of St Anthony was a common medieval subject, included in the Golden Legend and other sources. Schongauer's composition apparently shows a later episode in which St Anthony, normally flown about the desert supported by angels, was ambushed in mid-air by demons.

== Ownership ==
The painting was previously attributed to the workshop of Domenico Ghirlandaio, under whom Michelangelo had served his apprenticeship. Under that attribution it was bought at a Sotheby's auction in London in July 2008 by an American art dealer for US$2 million. When the export licence was obtained that September, it was brought to the Metropolitan Museum of Art in New York, where it was cleaned of discoloured varnish and later overpainting and closely examined for the first time. On the basis of stylistic hallmarks such as "emphatic cross hatching", it was decided that the painting was indeed by Michelangelo. It was soon bought by the Kimbell Art Museum for an undisclosed amount, believed to be in excess of $6 million. Though Giorgio Vasari states that Michelangelo painted a copy of Schongauer's print, experts disagree whether this is that painting.

== Characteristics ==
Giorgio Vasari in his Lives of the Artists noted that Michelangelo had painted St. Anthony after a print by Schongauer, and Ascanio Condivi recorded that Michelangelo had gone to a market to draw fish scales, a feature not present in the original engraving. Besides this enhancement, Michelangelo also added a landscape below the figures, and altered the expression of the saint.

== Legacy ==
It is one of only four surviving panel paintings by Michelangelo, whom Vasari records as speaking disparagingly of oil painting in later life, and the only one, if the new attribution holds, from his adolescence. Schongauer's late-Gothic style is also in strong contrast with the rest of Michelangelo's oeuvre, even in his youth. The prints of Schongauer, just reaching the end of his short life when Michelangelo copied him, were widely distributed in Europe, including Italy.

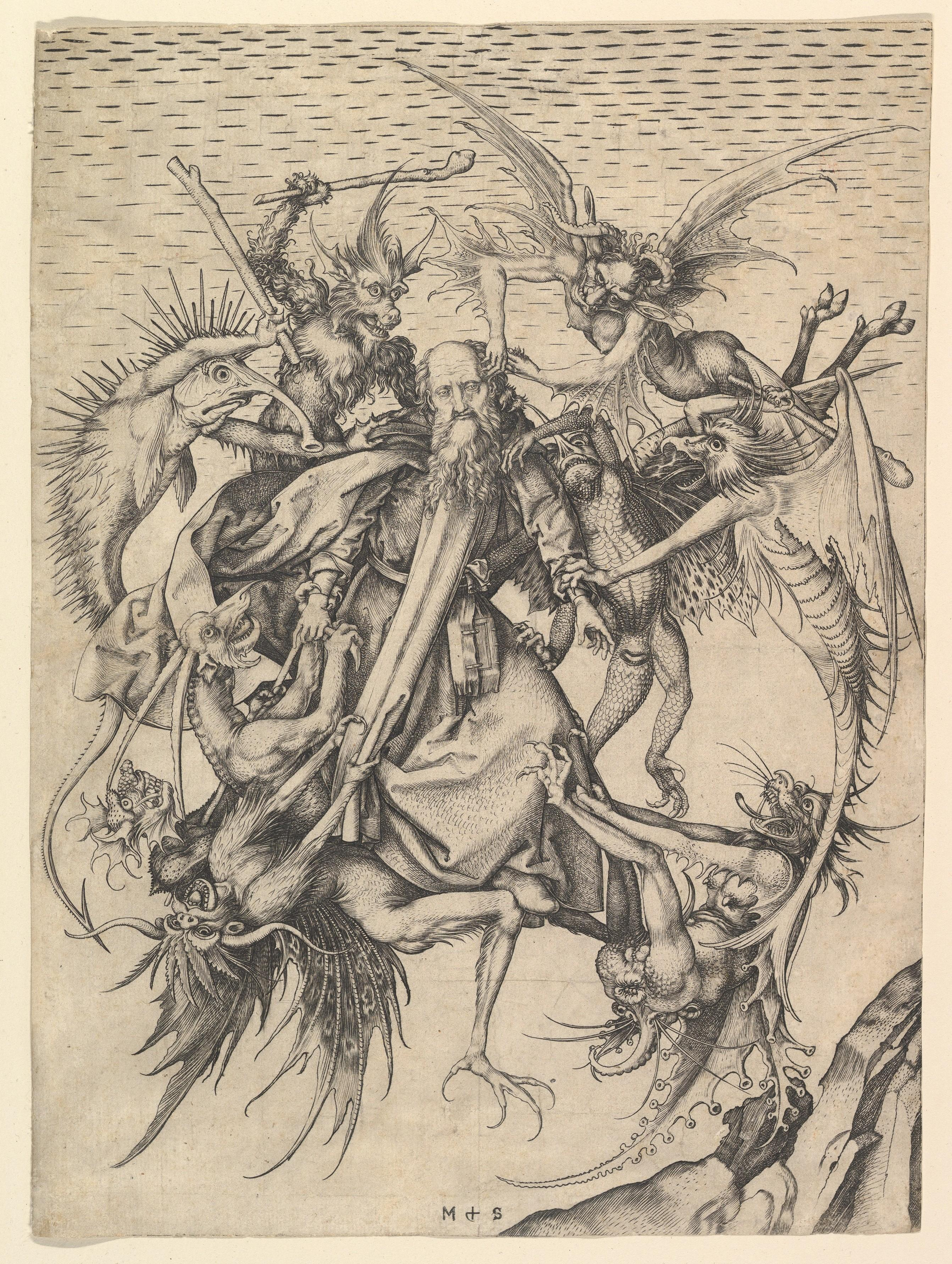
Martin Schongauer, The Temptation of St Anthony, c. 1470–1475

== See also ==
- List of works by Michelangelo
