= Byrne Construction Services =

American construction company in Texas

Byrne Construction Services (Thos. S. Byrne, Inc.)
- Company type: Corporation
- Industry: Construction Management, General Contracting
- Founded: 1923
- Founder: Thomas Sneed Byrne
- Headquarters: 551 E. Berry Street; Fort Worth, Texas
- Number of locations: 2 Offices in Texas
- Area served: Texas and Southwest Region
- Key people: John Avila, Jr. (Chairman)
- Products: Preconstruction; Construction Management; General Contractor; Design Build; BIM
- Services: Byrne provides General Contractor, Construction Manager, Design-Build, Preconstruction, Constructability Analysis, and Building Information Modeling services.
- Divisions: Green Building; Arts & Cultural Centers; Aviation; Education; Governmental; Healthcare; Hospitatlity; Manufacturing; Museum; Office; Parking Facilities; Renovation & Restoration; Condominium & High-End Residential
- Website: www.tsbyrne.com

Byrne Construction Services (Thos. S. Byrne, Inc.) is a Fort Worth, Texas based construction company providing construction manager and general contractor services. In addition to its Fort Worth headquarters, Byrne has a full-service office in San Antonio, Texas.

== History ==
Byrne was founded in Fort Worth in 1923 by Thomas Sneed Byrne, a native Texan and a 1913 graduate of the Massachusetts Institute of Technology. Byrne completed its first major contract, the Montgomery Ward's Building in Fort Worth, in 1928. Byrne also completed the renovation of the Montgomery Ward's Building into the Montgomery Plaza Condominiums in 2009.

Byrne is now in its third generation of management under the direction of John Avila, Jr., Chairman.

== Recognition ==
Byrne has served as the General Contractor for Louis Kahn's Kimbell Art Museum. The Kimbell Art Museum won the first Build America Award from the Associated General Contractors of America in 1972 for the "innovative construction techniques" used in the museum and the American Institute of Architects 25-Year Award.

== Notable Projects ==
- Plaza Theatre: El Paso, Texas
- Rachofsky House: Dallas, Texas
- Latino Cultural Center: Dallas, Texas
- Montgomery Plaza: Fort Worth, Texas
- Kimbell Art Museum: Fort Worth, Texas
- Old Red Courthouse: Dallas, Texas
- Ellis County Courthouse: Waxahachie, Texas
- Amon Carter Museum: Fort Worth, Texas
- Bob Bullock Texas State History Museum: Austin, Texas
- American Airlines C.R. Smith Museum: Fort Worth, Texas
- Booker T. Washington High School for the Performing and Visual Arts: Dallas, Texas

== See also ==
- Construction Data Company
- Associated Builders and Contractors
