= Hunter's Home =

1826 painting by Henri Voordecker

- Jagerswoning (Dutch)
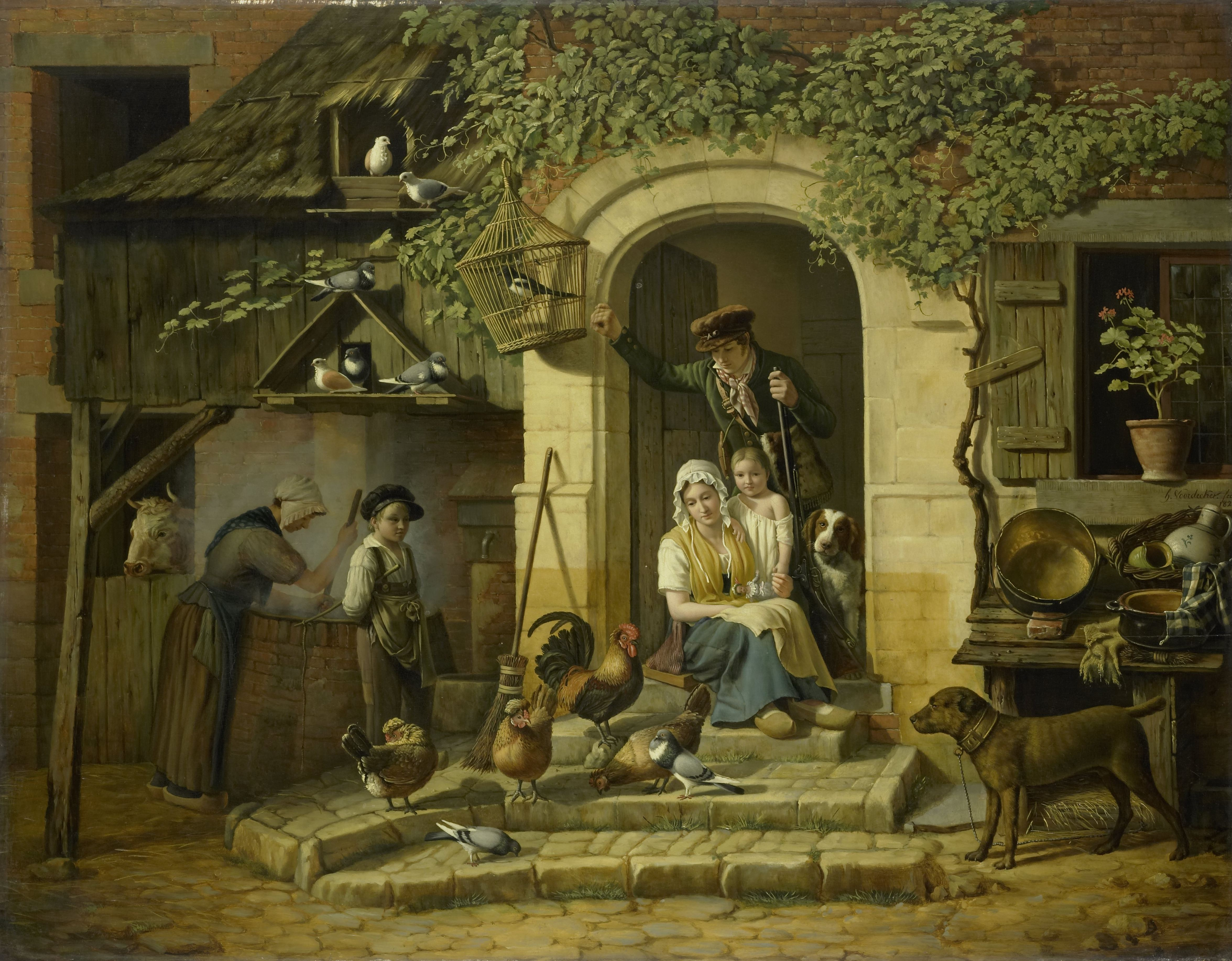
- Artist: Henry Voordecker
- Year: 1826
- Medium: Oil on canvas
- Dimensions: 62 cm × 78 cm (24 in × 31 in)
- Location: Rijksmuseum; Amsterdam

Hunter's Home (Dutch: Jagerswoning) is an 1826 oil painting by the Belgian artist Henry Voordecker. The painting depicts a hunter at home, surrounded by animals and members of his family; a typical genre painting. It is in the collection of the Rijksmuseum in Amsterdam.

It is in a typical Biedermeier style and its themes are characterized by the reinforced feelings of security, gemütlichkeit, traditional simplicity, portraying a sentimental view of the world.

The painting depicts a family at the doorway of their home. The dwelling is brick-built, with a vine scrambling around the arched stone doorway. A mother with a child sit in front of a young man in hunting clothes with a dog (perhaps a Dutch Partridge Dog) and a hunting gun. Chickens and doves are on the steps in front of the doorway; a magpie is in a cage beside the door, and more doves around a dovecote to the left. To the left of the steps stands another child, and a young woman doing laundry, with a horned white cow in a stable to the far left. To the right of the door is a second dog on a chain, various domestic pots and pans on the roof of a wooden kennel or henhouse, and a potted plant with small red flowers (perhaps a pelargonium) on a window ledge.

It is signed and dated "H. Voordecker fecit 1826", and measures 62 by 78 centimetres (24 in × 31 in). It was acquired by the Rijksmuseum in Amsterdam in 1828.
