= West 7th Fort Worth =

Retail district in Fort Worth, Texas, U.S.

Coordinates: 32.7499°N 97.3587°W

West 7th
- Location: Fort Worth, Texas, United States
- Address: 816 Foch Street
- Opened: 2010
- Manager: Vestar
- Owner: Cypress Equities and The Carlyle Group
- Architect: Good Fulton & Farrell
- Floors: 1
- Parking: Street and 5 Parking Garages
- Website: www.west-7th.com

West 7th is a shopping, dining and entertainment destination in the West Seventh Street District of Fort Worth, Texas near Montgomery Plaza. West 7th encompasses nearly five city blocks of boutique shopping, dining and entertainment options. The West 7th Development is also home to The Lofts at West 7th.

== History ==
The development is owned by Dallas-based Cypress Equities, a subsidiary of Staubach Company and managed by Arizona-based Vestar. Cypress Equities bought up the old Acme Brick headquarters and other sections around West 7th in 2006 and partnered with The Carlyle Group investment firm to fund the $200 million project. The development was designed by Good Fulton & Farrell of Dallas. West 7th celebrated its grand opening in March 2010, and has since added more restaurants and shops. West 7th is one of several pedestrian-oriented, urban village developments in Fort Worth, a style that was more common in the city before automobiles.

== Shops ==
The 900,000 sq ft (84,000 m^{2}) center consists of restaurants including: Thirteen Pies, Tillman's Roadhouse, A F+B, Dude, Sweet Chocolate, Waters Bonnell's Coastal Cuisine, Kona Grill, Terra Mediterranean Grill, and one of the top 100 steakhouse in America, Rafain Brazilian Steakhouse. Kin Kin Urban Thai, opened March 9, 2015 and will be followed by Mash'd in later 2015. The development also features retailers like Flirt Boutique, Lane-Knight, and WRARE, along with merchants such as LA Fitness, TONI & GUY, The Boardroom Salon for Men, and Movie Tavern.

== See also ==
- List of shopping malls in Texas
