= Kimbell Art Museum =

Art museum in Texas, US

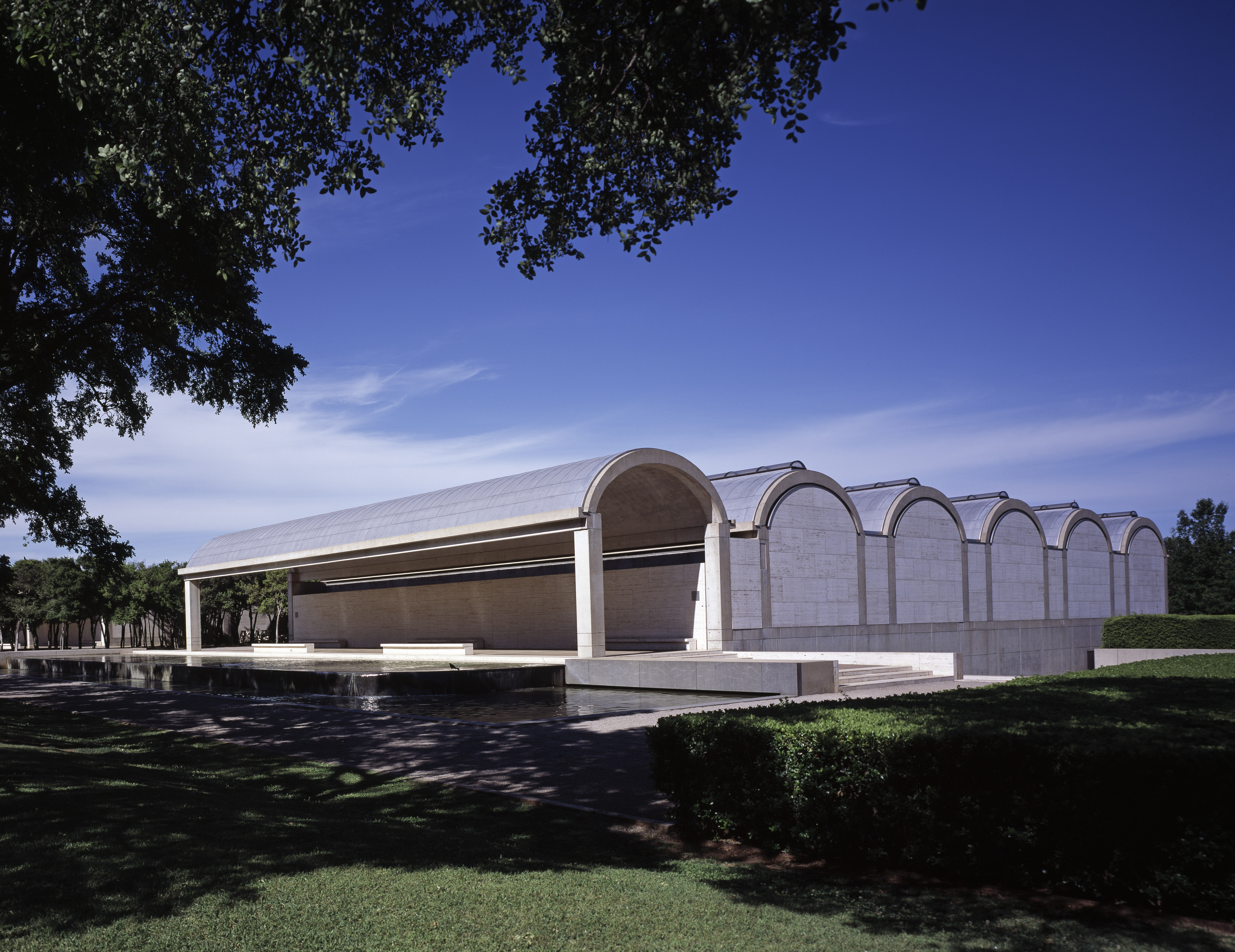
- The south wing of the museum showing a portico and five vaulted galleries. The tree-lined entry courtyard is at the far left.
- Interactive fullscreen map
- Established: 1972
- Location: Fort Worth, Texas, U.S.
- Coordinates: 32°44′55″N 97°21′54″W
- Type: Art museum
- Collections: European Old Masters
- Collection size: 350
- Director: Eric M. Lee
- Parking: On site (no charge)
- Website: www.kimbellart.org

The Kimbell Art Museum in Fort Worth, Texas, hosts an art collection as well as traveling art exhibitions, educational programs and an extensive research library. Its initial artwork came from the private collection of Kay and Velma Kimbell, who also provided funds for a new building to house it.

The building was designed by architect Louis I. Kahn and is widely recognized as one of the most significant works of architecture of recent times. It is especially noted for the wash of silvery natural light across its vaulted gallery ceilings.

== History ==
Kay Kimbell was a wealthy Fort Worth businessman who built an empire of over 70 companies in a variety of industries. He married Velma Fuller, who kindled his interest in art collecting by taking him to an art show in Fort Worth in 1931, where he bought a British painting. They set up the Kimbell Art Foundation in 1935 to establish an art institute, and by the time of his death in 1964, the couple had amassed what was considered to be the best selection of old masters in the Southwest. Kay left much of his estate to the Kimbell Art Foundation, and Velma bequeathed her share of the estate to the foundation as well, with the key directive to "build a museum of the first class."

Michelangelo, The Torment of Saint Anthony, 1487-88

The foundation's board of trustees hired Richard Fargo Brown, then director of the Los Angeles County Museum of Art, as the founding director of the museum with the task of constructing a building to house the Kimbell's art collection. Upon accepting the post, Brown declared that the new building should itself be a work of art, "as much a gem as one of the Rembrandts or Van Dycks housed within it." The proposed museum was given space in a 9.5 acre (3.8 hectare) site in Fort Worth's Cultural District, which was already home to three other museums, including the Fort Worth Art Museum-Center (now the Modern Art Museum of Fort Worth) and the Amon Carter Museum, specializing in art of the American West.

Brown discussed the goals of the institution and its new building with the trustees and summarized them in a four-page "Policy Statement" and a nineteen-page "Pre-Architectural Program" in June 1966. After interviewing a number of prominent architects, the museum hired Louis Kahn in October 1966. Brown issued specific requests, encouraging Kahn to deliver his best. Brown wanted Kahn to build a museum that could exhibit art that had been seen by polite society so that a visit to the museum would expand the opportunities of ordinary citizens. Kahn's previous works included such acclaimed structures as the Salk Institute in California, and he had recently been honored by being chosen to design the National Assembly Building for what would become the capital of the new nation of Bangladesh. Construction for the Kimbell Art Museum began in the summer of 1969. The new building opened in October 1972 and quickly achieved an international reputation for architectural excellence.

Brown also expanded the Kimbell collection by acquiring several works of significant quality by artists like Duccio, El Greco, Rubens, and Rembrandt.

After Richard Fargo Brown's death in 1979, Edmund "Ted" Pillsbury was appointed director of the museum. Previously he had been the director of the newly opened Yale Center for British Art, which, coincidentally, was also designed by Louis Kahn. He had also been a curator at the Yale Art Gallery, Kahn's first art museum. Pillsbury continued the art acquisition program in an aggressive but disciplined fashion. Richard Brettell, director of the Dallas Museum of Art, said, "He was, in some ways, single-handedly responsible for turning the Kimbell from an institution with a great building into one whose collection matched its architecture in quality".

In 1989, Pillsbury announced plans to expand the museum's building to accommodate its enlarged collection, but the plan was dropped because of strong opposition to any major alteration of the original Louis Kahn structure. In 2007, the Kimbell solved that problem by announcing plans to construct an additional, separate building across the street from the original building. While this did not alter the Kahn structure, it did significantly alter Kahn's work. Kahn had designed the building to be approached from the lawn, and the new structure significantly altered that plan. Designed by Renzo Piano, and relocated to the west lawn, the new structure opened to the public in November 2013.

The museum is part of the Monuments Men and Women Museum Network, launched in 2021 by the Monuments Men Foundation for the Preservation of Art.

== Collection ==
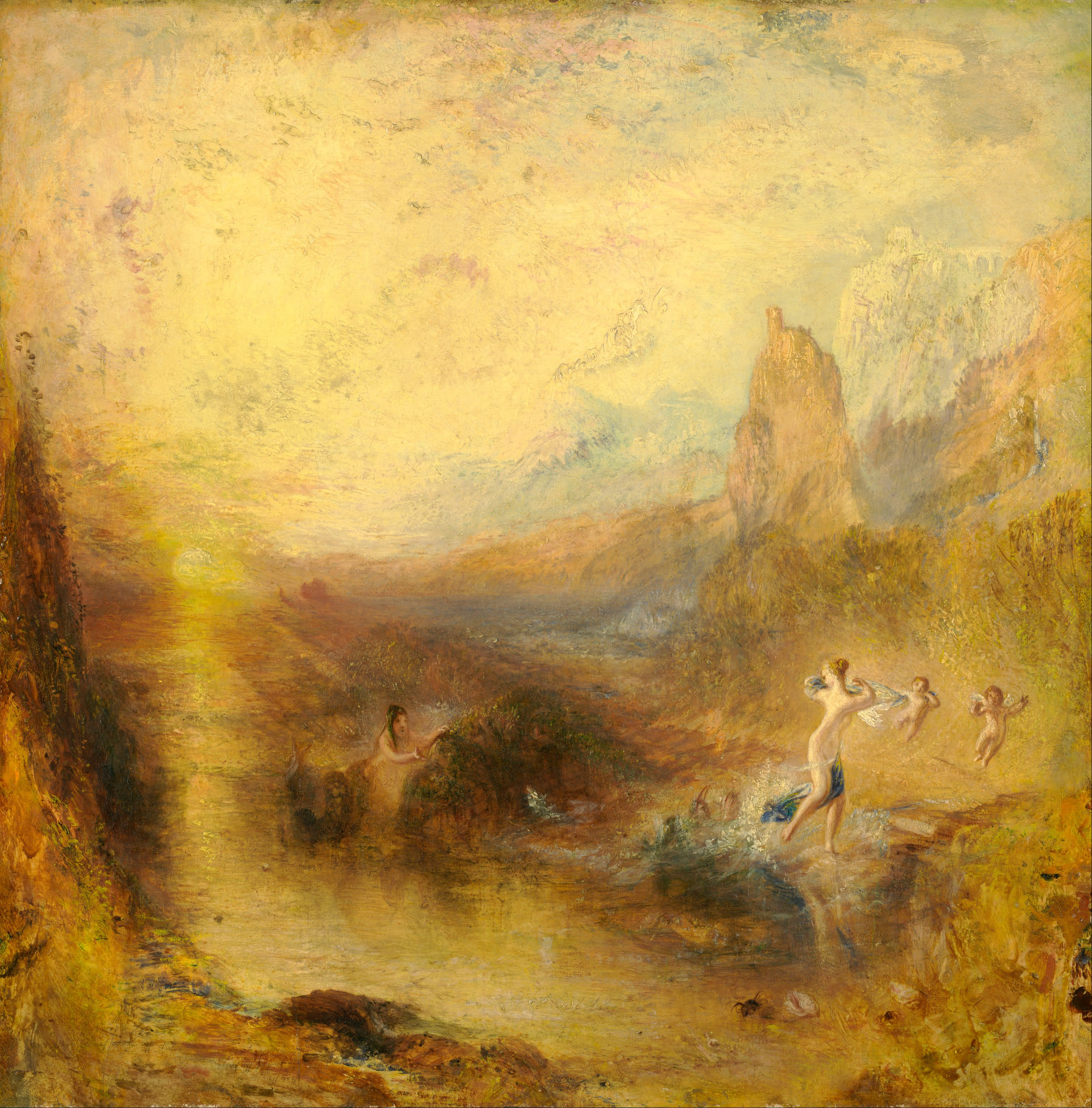
Joseph Mallord William Turner, 1841, Glaucus and Scylla, oil on panel, 77 × 78 cm

Georges Braque, 1911–12, Girl with a Cross, oil on canvas, 55 x 43 cm

Joan Miró, 1918, Portrait of Heriberto Casany, oil on canvas, 70.2 x 62 cm

In 1966, before the museum even had a building, founding director Brown included this directive in his Policy Statement: "The goal shall be definitive excellence, not size of collection." Accordingly, the museum's collection today consists of only about 350 works of art, but they are of notably high quality.

The European collection is the most extensive in the museum and includes Michelangelo's first known painting, The Torment of Saint Anthony, the only painting by Michelangelo on exhibit in the Americas. It also includes works by Duccio, Fra Angelico, Mantegna, El Greco, Carracci, Caravaggio, Rubens, Guercino, La Tour, Poussin, Velázquez, Rembrandt, Boucher, Gainsborough, Vigée-Lebrun, Friedrich (the first painting by the artist acquired by a public collection outside of Europe), Cézanne, Monet, Caillebotte, Matisse, Bonnard, Mondrian, Braque, Miró and Picasso. Works from the classical period include antiquities from Ancient Egypt, Assyria, Greece and Rome. The Asian collection comprises sculptures, paintings, bronzes, ceramics, and works of decorative art from China, Korea, Japan, India, Nepal, Tibet, Cambodia, and Thailand. Precolumbian art is represented by Maya works in ceramic, stone, shell, and jade, Olmec, Zapotec, and Aztec sculpture, as well as pieces from the Conte and Huari cultures. The African collection consists primarily of bronze, wood, and terracotta sculpture from West and Central Africa, including examples from Nigeria, Angola, and the Democratic Republic of the Congo, and Oceanic art is represented by a Maori figure.

The museum owns only a few pieces created after the mid-20th century (believing that era to be the province of its neighbor, the Modern Art Museum of Fort Worth) and no American art (believing that to be the province of its other neighbor, the Amon Carter Museum).

The museum also houses a substantial library with over 59,000 books, periodicals and auction catalogs that are available as a resource to art historians and to faculty and graduate students from surrounding universities.

== Building ==
=== Preparation ===
Brown's "Policy Statement" set a clear architectural direction by calling for the new building to be "a work of art", It was augmented by his "Pre-Architectural Program", which specified that "natural light should play a vital part" in the design and that "the form of the building should be so complete in its beauty that additions would spoil that form." Brown called for a building of modest scale that would not overwhelm either the artwork or the viewer.

After an extensive search that included interviews with such noted architects as Marcel Breuer, Mies van der Rohe, Pier Luigi Nervi, Gordon Bunshaft and Edward Larrabee Barnes, the commission was awarded to Louis Kahn in October 1966. From Kahn's point of view, Brown was an ideal client. Brown had been an admirer of Kahn's work for some time, and the approach he specified for the building was very much in line with Kahn's, particularly its emphasis on natural light.

Because Kahn had a reputation for significant time and cost overruns, a local engineering and architectural firm owned by Preston M. Geren was made associate architect, a practice followed in Fort Worth for out-of-state architects. Frank Sherwood served as their project coordinator. The Geren organization had a solid reputation for bringing in projects on time and within budget, but by their own admission they were not especially innovative. The contract called for control over construction to be turned over to Geren when Kahn had finished the design, a provision that eventually led to conflict because Kahn felt that a design was never finished until the building was constructed. Kahn once said, "the building gives you answers as it grows and becomes itself." The museum trustees settled the issue by deciding that Geren would report directly to them instead of to Kahn, but that Kahn would have final say over the design, except that any changes would have to be approved by Brown.

The new museum was to be built on a gentle slope below the Amon Carter Museum, whose entrance and terrace faced the Fort Worth skyline. Kahn was asked to build the Kimbell museum no more than 40 feet (12 m) high so it would not interfere with the view from the Carter Museum. Kahn initially proposed a low but very spacious building 450 feet (137 m) square, but Brown rejected that proposal and insisted that Kahn design a much smaller structure, a decision that would have repercussions several years later when a proposal to expand the building created a storm of controversy.

=== Architecture ===
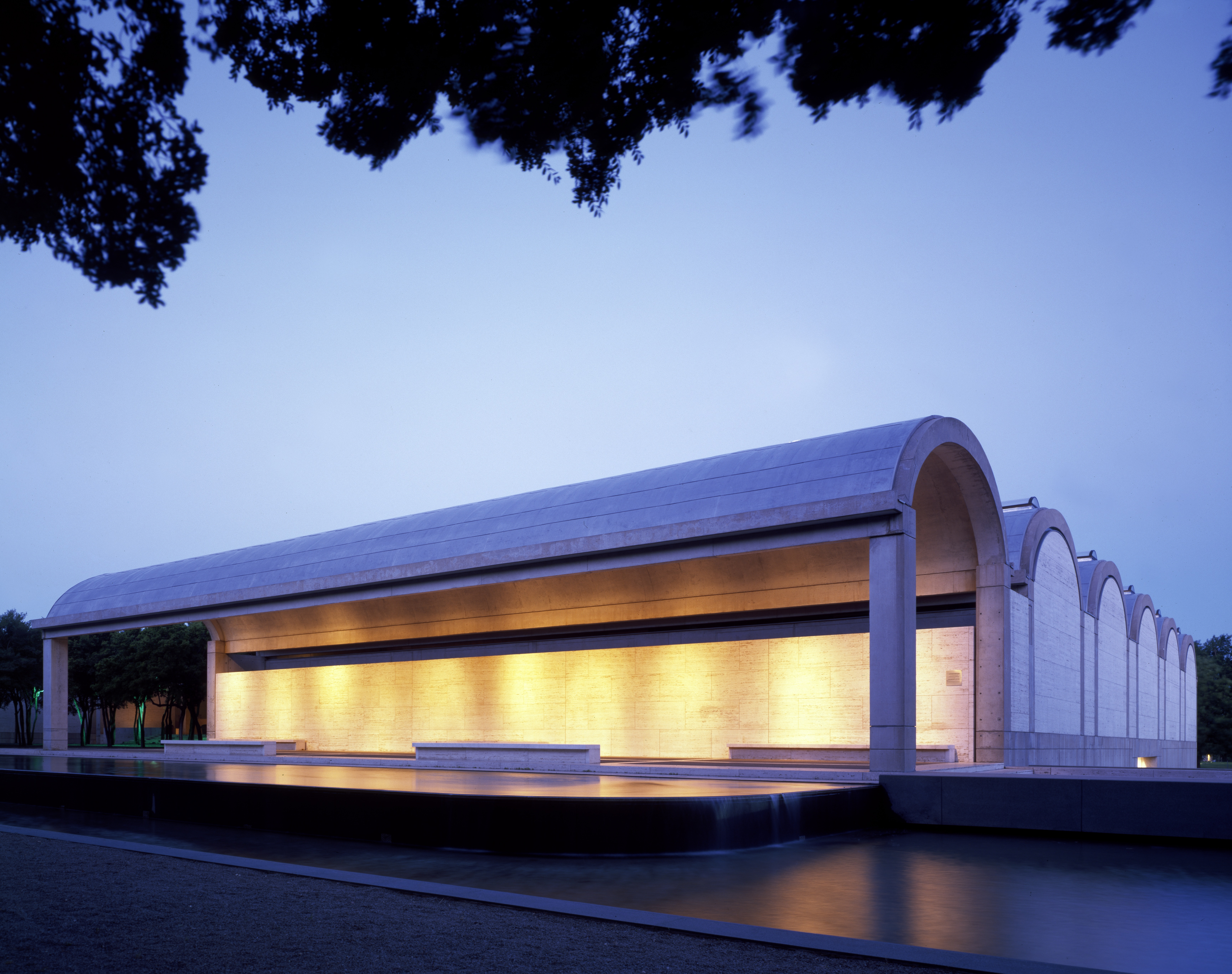
Kimbell Art Museum at dusk

The museum is composed of 16 parallel vaults that are each 100 feet (30.6 m) long, 20 feet (6 m) high and 20 feet (6 m) wide (internal measurements). Intervening low channels separate the vaults. The vaults are grouped into three wings. The north and south wings each have six vaults, with the western one open as a portico. The central space has four vaults, with the western one open as an entry porch facing a courtyard partially enclosed by the two outside wings.

With one exception, the art galleries are located on the upper floor of the museum to allow access to natural light. Service and curatorial spaces as well as an additional gallery occupy the ground floor. Each interior vault has a slot along its apex to allow natural light into the galleries. Air ducts and other mechanical services are located in the flat channels between the vaults.

Kahn used several techniques to give the galleries an inviting atmosphere. The ends of the vaults, which are made of concrete block, are faced with travertine inside and out. The steel handrails were "blasted" with ground pecan shells to create a matte surface texture. The museum has three glass-walled courtyards that bring natural light to the gallery spaces. One of them penetrates the gallery floor to bring natural light to the conservation studio on the ground floor.

The landscape has been described as "Kahn's most elegant built example of landscape planning" by Philadelphia landscape architect George Patton. Approaching the main entrance past a lawn edged by pools with running water, the visitor enters a courtyard through a grove of Yaupon Holly trees. The sound of footsteps on the gravel walkway echoes from the walls on either side of the courtyard and is magnified under the curved ceiling of the entry porch. After that subtle preparation, the visitor enters the hushed museum with silvery light spread across its ceiling. Harriet Pattison played the lead role in the landscape design and is also the person who suggested that open porches flanking the entrance would create a good transition from the lawn and courtyard to the galleries inside. Pattison, who had also worked with Kahn on other projects, was an employee of Patton. She is the mother of film director Nathaniel Kahn, Louis Kahn's son who made the film "My Architect" about his father.

==== Vaults ====
Kahn's first design for the galleries called for angular vaults of folded concrete plates with light slots at the top. Brown liked the light slots but rejected this particular design because it had the ceilings 30 feet (9 m) high, too high for the museum he envisioned. Further research by Marshall Meyers, Kahn's project architect for the Kimbell museum, revealed that using a cycloid curve for the gallery vaults would reduce the ceiling height and provide other benefits as well. The relatively flat cycloid curve would produce elegant galleries that were wide in proportion to their height, allowing the ceiling to be lowered to 20 feet (6 m). More importantly, that curve could also be used to produce a beautiful distribution of natural light from a slot in the top of the gallery across the entire gallery ceiling.

Kahn was pleased with this development because it allowed him to design the museum with galleries that resembled the ancient Roman vaults he had always admired. The thin, curved shells needed for the roof were challenging to build, however, so Kahn called in a leading authority on concrete construction, August Komendant, with whom he had worked before (and who, like Kahn, was born in Estonia). Kahn generally referred to the museum's roof form as a vault, but Komendant explained that it was actually a shell playing the role of a beam. More precisely, as professor Steven Fleming points out, the shells that form the gallery roofs are "post-tensioned curved concrete beams, spanning an incredible 100 feet" (30.5 m), which "happened to have been the maximum distance that concrete walls or vaults could be produced without requiring expansion control joints." Both terms, vault and shell, are used in professional literature describing the museum.

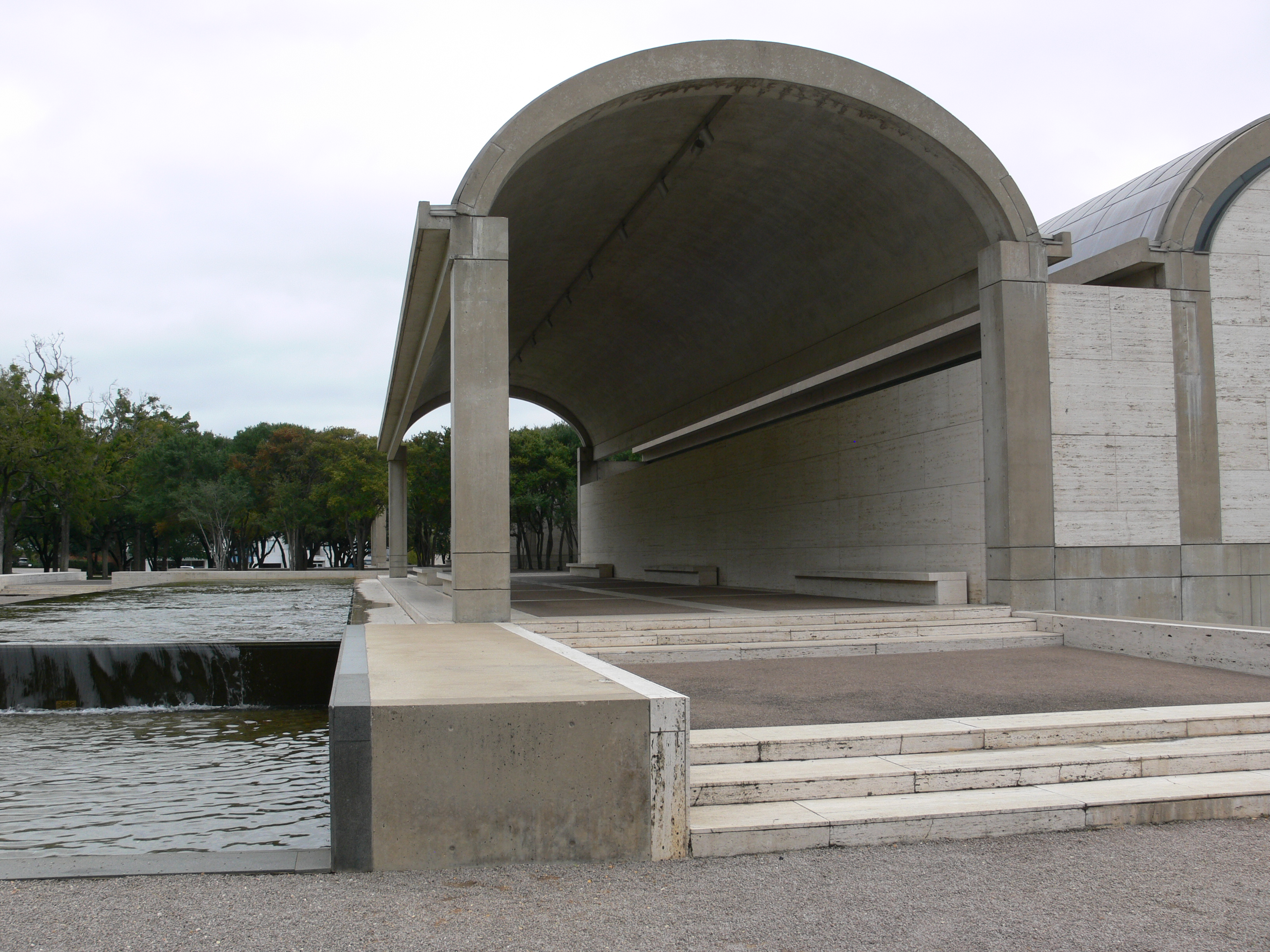
One of the porticos at the front of the museum. This shell, like all the others, is supported only at its four corners, minimizing obstruction at floor level.

True vaults, such as the Roman vaults that Kahn admired, will collapse if not supported along the entire lengths of each side. Not fully understanding the capabilities of modern concrete shells, Kahn initially planned to include many more support columns than were necessary for the gallery roofs. Komendant was able to use post-tensioned concrete that was only five inches thick to create gallery "vaults" that need support columns only at their four corners.

The Geren firm, which had been asked to look for ways to keep costs low, objected that the cycloid vaults would be too expensive and urged a flat roof instead. Kahn, however, insisted on a vaulted roof, which would enable him to create galleries with a comforting, room-like atmosphere yet with minimal need for columns or other internal structures that would reduce the museum's flexibility. Eventually a deal was struck whereby Geren would be responsible for the foundation and basement while Komendant would be responsible for the upper floors and cycloid shells. Kahn placed one of these shells at the front of each of the three wings as a porch or portico to illustrate how the building was constructed. The effect was, in his words, "like a piece of sculpture outside the building."

Thos. S. Byrne, Ltd. was the contractor for the project, with A. T. Seymour as project manager. Virgil Earp and L. G. Shaw, Byrne's project superintendents, designed forms with a cycloid shape that were made from hinged plywood and lined with an oily coating so they could be reused to pour concrete for multiple sections of the vaults, helping to ensure consistency. The long, straight channels at the bottoms of the shells were cast first so they could be used as platforms to support the workmen pouring concrete for the cycloid curves. After all the concrete had been poured and strengthened with internal post-tensioning cables, however, the curved parts of the shells carried the weight of their lower straight edges instead of the other way around.

To prevent the shells from collapsing at the long light slots at their apexes, concrete struts were inserted at 10-foot (3 m) intervals. A relatively thick concrete arch was added to each end of the shells to stiffen them further. To make it clear that the curved shells are supported only at their four corners and not by the walls at the ends of the vaults, thin arcs of transparent material were inserted between the curve of the shells and the end walls. Because the stiffening arches of the shells are thicker at the top, the transparent strips are tapered, thinner at the top than at the bottom. In addition, a linear transparent strip was placed between the straight bottoms of the shells and the long exterior walls to show that the shells aren't supported by those walls either. In addition to revealing the building's structure, these features bring additional natural light into the galleries in a way that is safe for the paintings.

The vault roofs, which are visible to approaching visitors, were covered with lead sheathing inspired by the lead covering of the complexly curved roofs of the Doge's Palace and St. Mark's Basilica in Venice, Italy.

==== Skylights ====
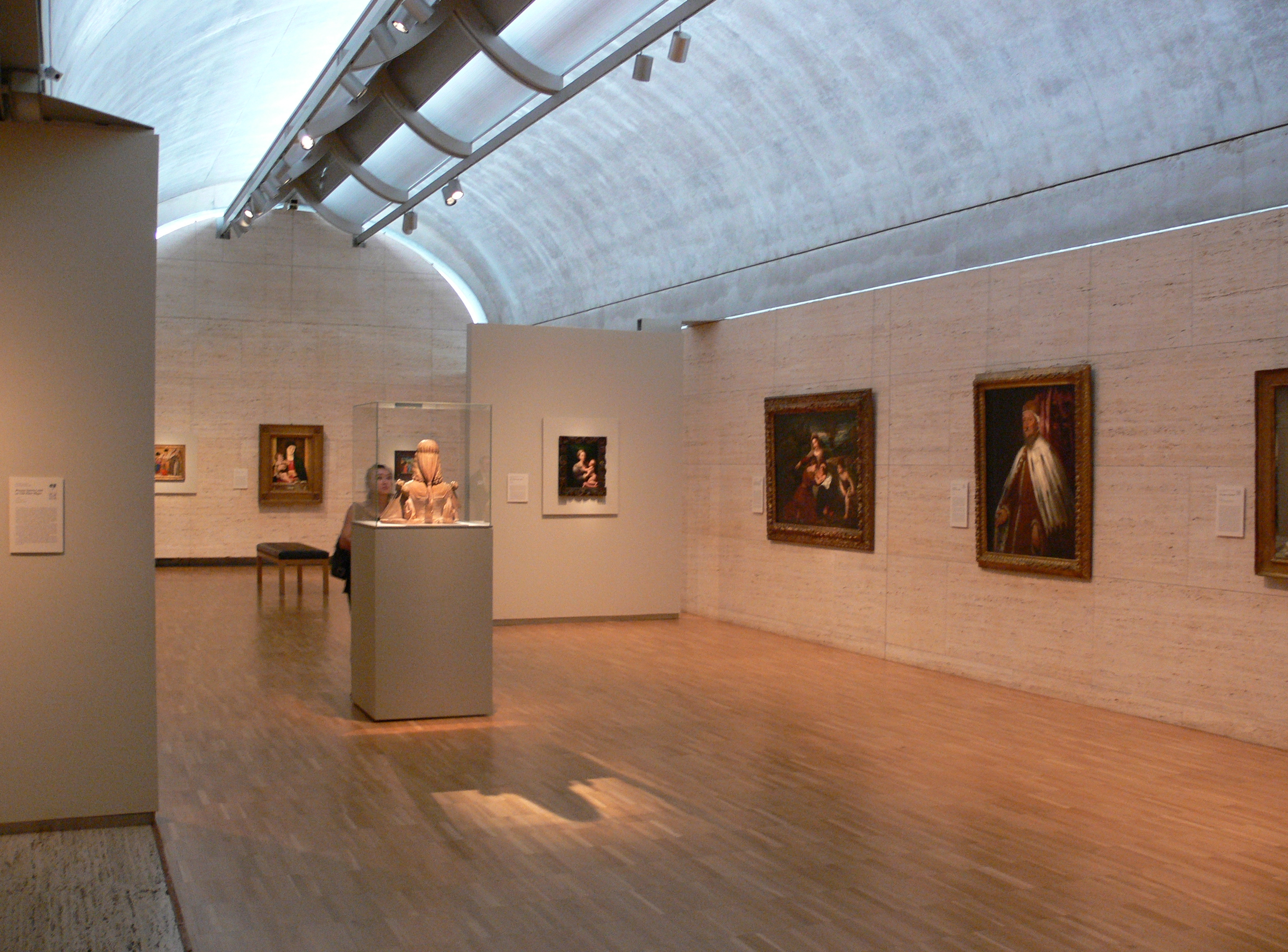
Reflectors spread sunlight across the gallery ceilings. Kahn showed that the curved ceiling shells are supported only at their corners by allowing a thin strip of outside light to enter along the tops of the long gallery walls and a thicker arc of light to enter at the end of each gallery.

David Brownlee and David DeLong, authors of Louis I. Kahn: In The Realm of Architecture, declare that "in Fort Worth, Kahn created a skylight system without peer in the history of architecture." Robert McCarter, author of Louis I. Kahn, says the entry gallery is "one of the most beautiful spaces ever built", with its "astonishing, ethereal, silver-colored light." Carter Wiseman, author of Louis I. Kahn: Beyond Time and Style, said that "the light in the Kimbell gallery assumed an almost ethereal quality, and has been the distinguishing factor in its fame ever since."

The Kimbell Cafe at the Kimbell Art Museum

Creating a natural lighting system that has evoked such acclaim was challenging, and Kahn's office and the lighting designer Richard Kelly investigated over 100 approaches in their search for the proper skylight system. The goal was to illuminate the galleries with indirect natural light while excluding all direct sunlight, which would damage the artwork. Richard Kelly, lighting consultant, determined that a reflecting screen made of perforated anodized aluminum with a specific curve could be used to distribute natural light evenly across the cycloid curve of the ceiling. He hired a computer expert to determine the exact shape of the reflector's curve, making it one of the first architectural elements to be designed with computer technology.

In areas without art, such as the lobby, cafeteria and library, the entire reflector is perforated, making it possible for people standing beneath to glimpse passing clouds. In the gallery spaces, the central part of the reflector, which is directly beneath the sun, is solid, while the remainder is perforated. The concrete surfaces of the ceiling were given a high finish to further assist the reflection of the light. The result is that the Texas sun enters a narrow slot at the top of each vault and is evenly reflected from a curved screen across the entire arc of the polished concrete ceiling, ensuring a distribution of natural light that had previously not been achieved.

=== Expansion ===
In 1989, director Ted Pillsbury, Brown's successor, announced plans to add two wings to the north and south ends of the building and chose architect Romaldo Giurgola to design them. A firestorm of protest erupted. Critics pointed out that founding director Brown's "Pre-Architectural Program" had specified that "the form of the building should be so complete in its beauty that additions would spoil that form," and that Kahn had achieved that goal extraordinarily well.

A group of prominent architects signed a letter acknowledging the need for additional space but arguing that the proposed addition would compromise the proportions of the original. They noted that when Kahn himself was questioned about the possibility of a future expansion, he said that it should "occur as a new building and be situated away from the present structure across the lawn". Esther Kahn, Louis Kahn's widow, published a letter voicing similar sentiments, noting that "there is room on the site for a separate building, which could be connected to the present museum." The project was cancelled a few months later.

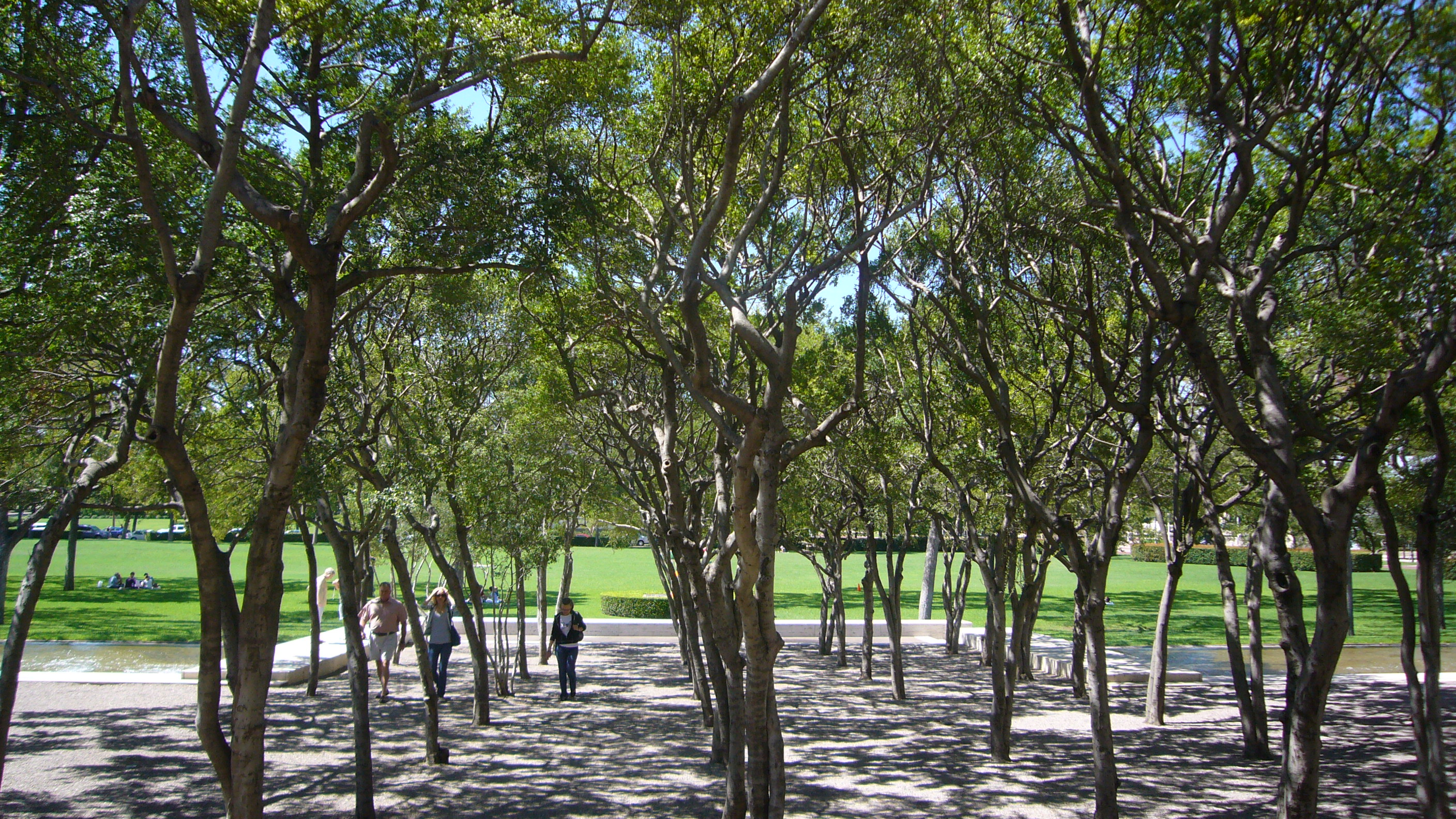
Kahn intended visitors to enter through the thoughtful landscaping at the front entry...

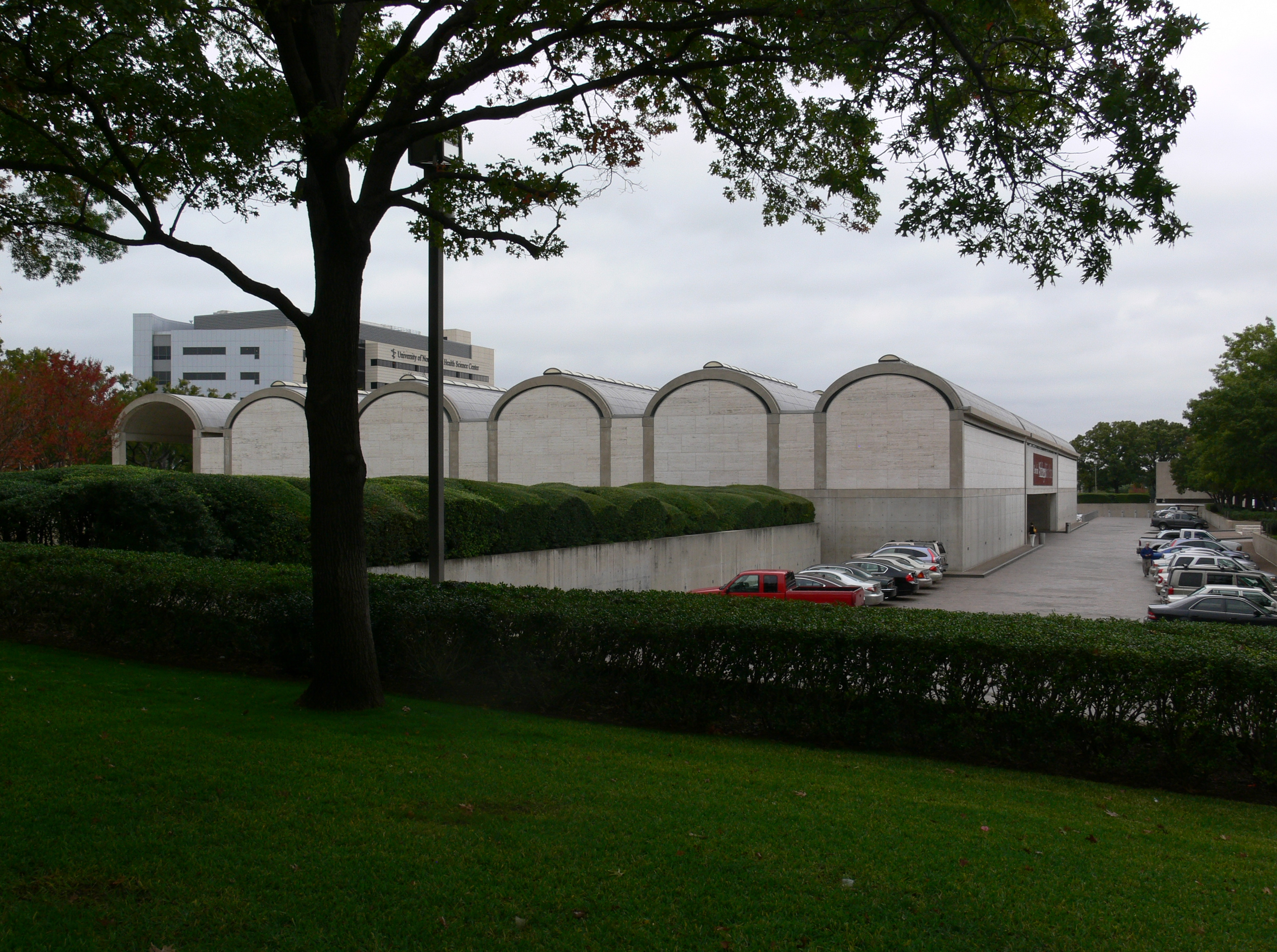
...but most visitors entered through the rear door from the parking lot. The new underground parking garage should solve this problem.

==== Renzo Piano Pavilion ====
In 2006, the idea of an expansion surfaced once again at a dinner in Fort Worth attended by Timothy Potts, the museum's director at the time (Eric M. Lee has been the director since March 2009); Kay Fortson, president of the Kimbell Art Foundation and a key figure in the creation of the original building; Ben Fortson, a trustee; and Sue Ann Kahn, Louis Kahn's daughter and a vocal opponent of the original plan for expansion. The new proposal was exactly in line with Louis Kahn's own thoughts for expansion: a separate building. At that time, the new structure was to be sited on land to the back of the Kahn building.

In April 2007, the museum announced that Renzo Piano had been chosen to design the new building. Piano was an obvious choice because he had worked in Louis Kahn's office as a young man and had later established a reputation as one of the world's leading museum architects. Piano had been particularly active in Texas, designing the Menil Collection in Houston, a commission in Louis Kahn's studio at the time of Kahn's death, and the Nasher Sculpture Center in Dallas. He also designed the expansion for the Art Institute of Chicago and was co-designer of the Pompidou Centre in Paris.

The schematic designs for the new Kimbell building were made public in November 2008, and the plans were released in May 2010. The 85,000 square foot (7,900 m^{2}) structure would complement the original building but not mimic it. Unlike the original, its lines would be rectilinear, not curvilinear. Like the original, however, it would have three bays with the middle bay stepped back from the other two. The new building expansion, named the Renzo Piano Pavilion, was officially inaugurated to the public on November 27, 2013.

The new building should also resolve a parking issue at the museum. Kahn was deeply troubled by the negative impact of the automobile on city life; he once spoke of "the destruction of the city by the motor car." Fundamentally opposed to the idea of orienting buildings to the automobile, Kahn placed the main parking lot in the back of the building, intending for visitors to walk around the building and enter through carefully planned landscaping. Most visitors, however, entered through the back door on the ground floor, missing the entry experience that Kahn had designed. The new building will solve the problem with an underground parking garage. After visitors ascend to the gallery level of the new building, they can exit it and walk across the lawn and the courtyard to enter the original building as Kahn had intended.

=== Recognition ===
- In 1998, the American Institute of Architects gave the museum their prestigious Twenty-five Year Award, which is awarded to no more than one building per year.
- Robert Campbell, architectural critic for the Boston Globe and winner of the Pulitzer Prize for Criticism, declared it to be "the greatest American building of the second half of the 20th century."
- Robert McCarter, author of Louis I. Kahn, said that the Kimbell Art Museum "is rightly considered Kahn's greatest built work" and "has been the subject of more scholarly studies than all his other works combined."
- Carter Wiseman, author of Louis I. Kahn: Beyond Time and Style, said, "With the Kimbell, Kahn had achieved something unique in the history of modern architecture, a building that engages an element of nature—sunlight—with unprecedented skill and combined it with a contemporary program in a structure that also called upon the most advanced engineering while invoking the monuments of the past."
- Thos. S. Byrne, Ltd., the construction contractor, won the first Build America Award from the Associated General Contractors of America in 1972 for the "innovative construction techniques" used on the museum.

== European collection highlights ==
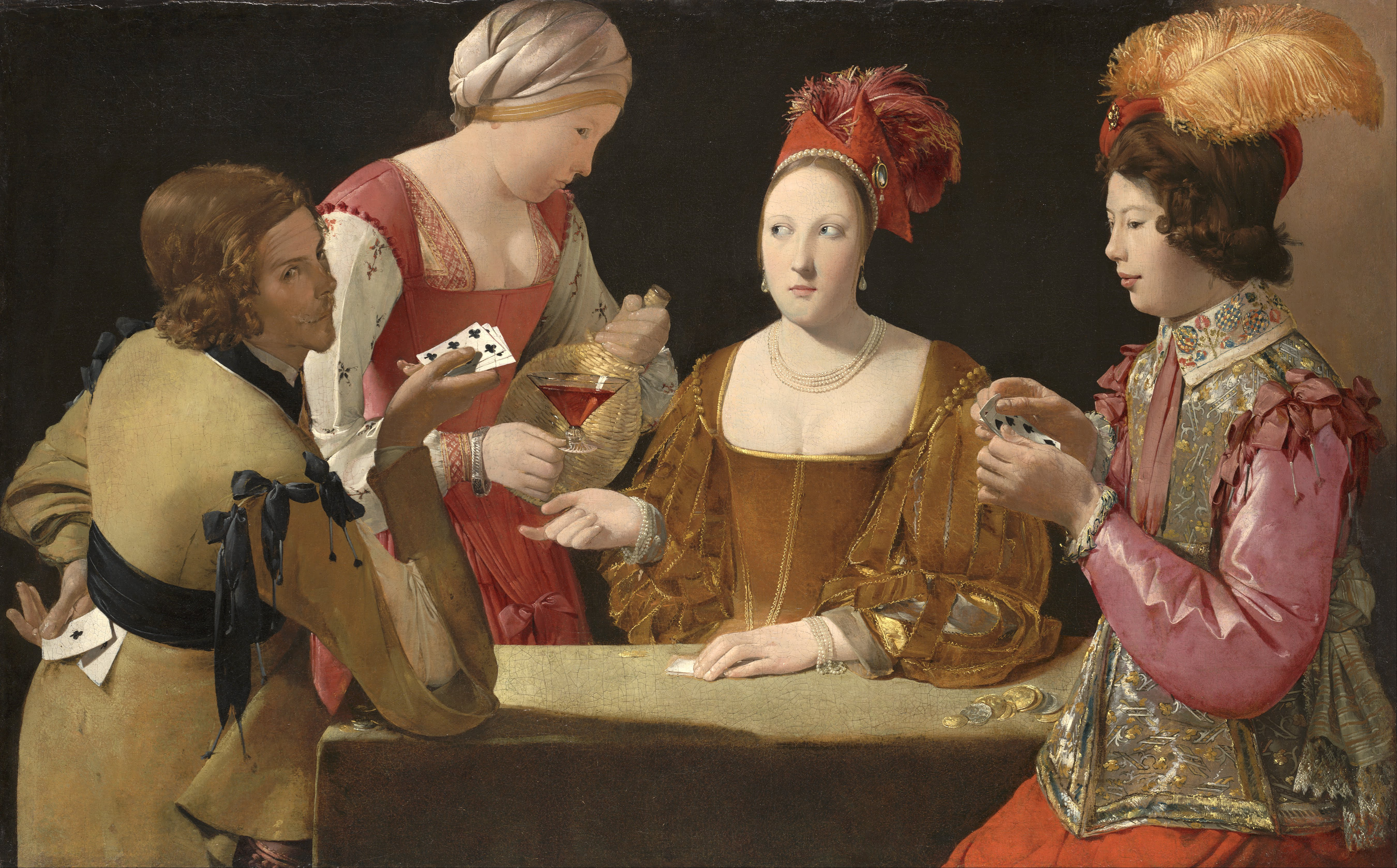
Georges de La Tour, The Cheat with the Ace of Clubs, c. late 1620s; another version is in the Louvre.

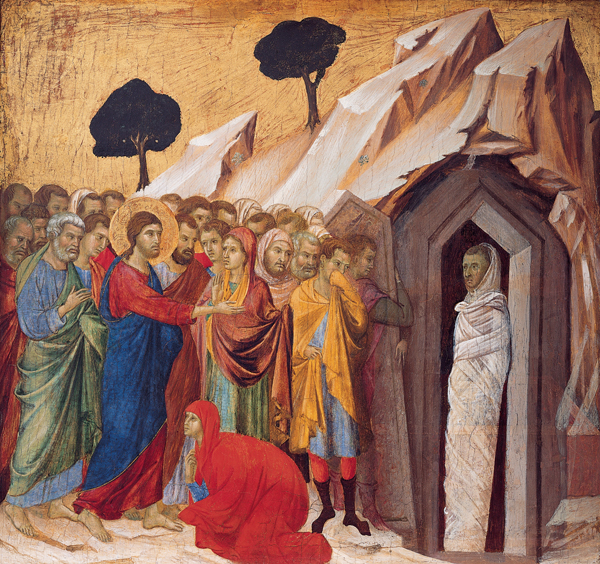
Duccio di Buoninsegna, The Raising of Lazarus, 1310

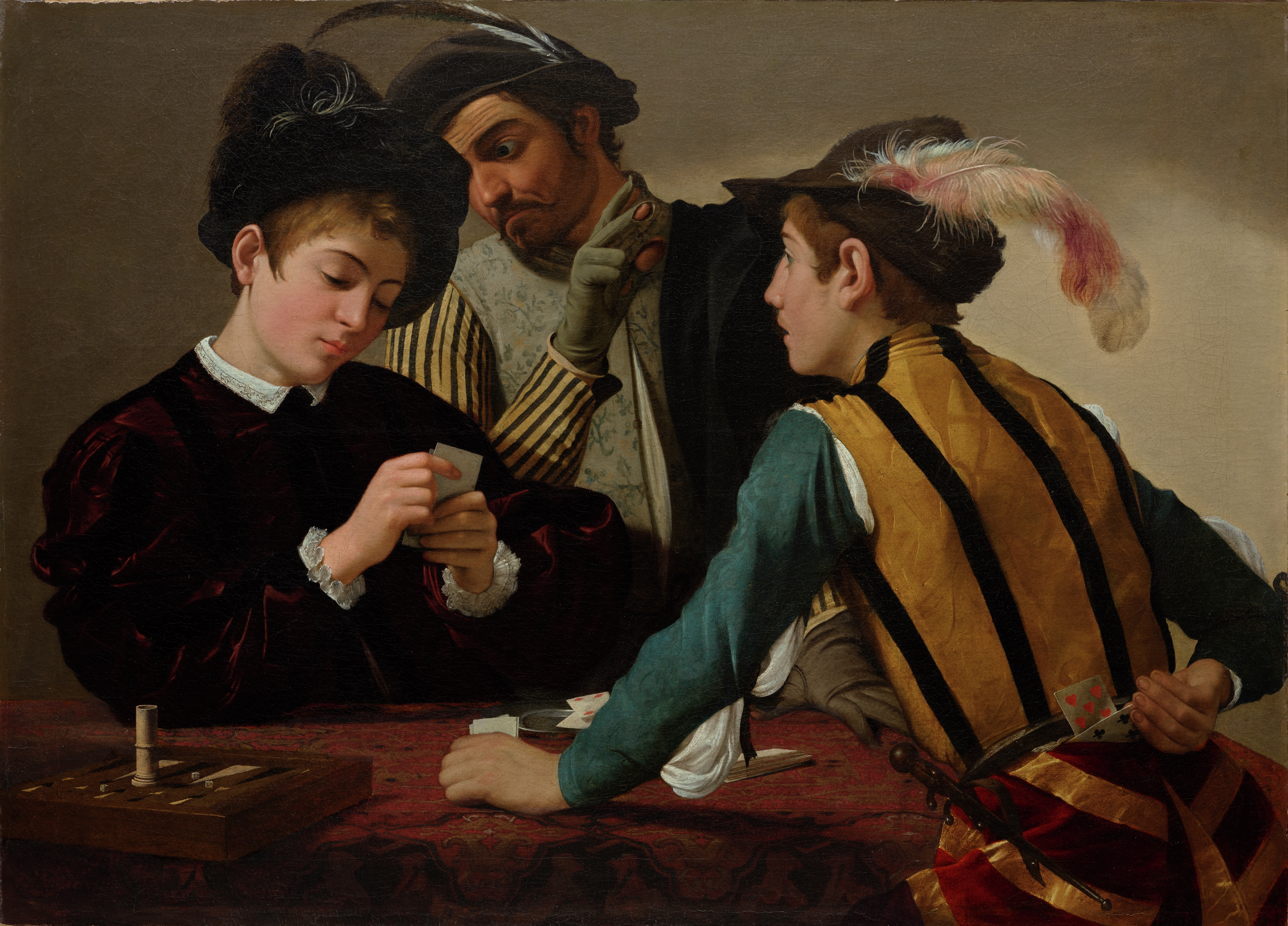
Caravaggio, The Cardsharps, 1594

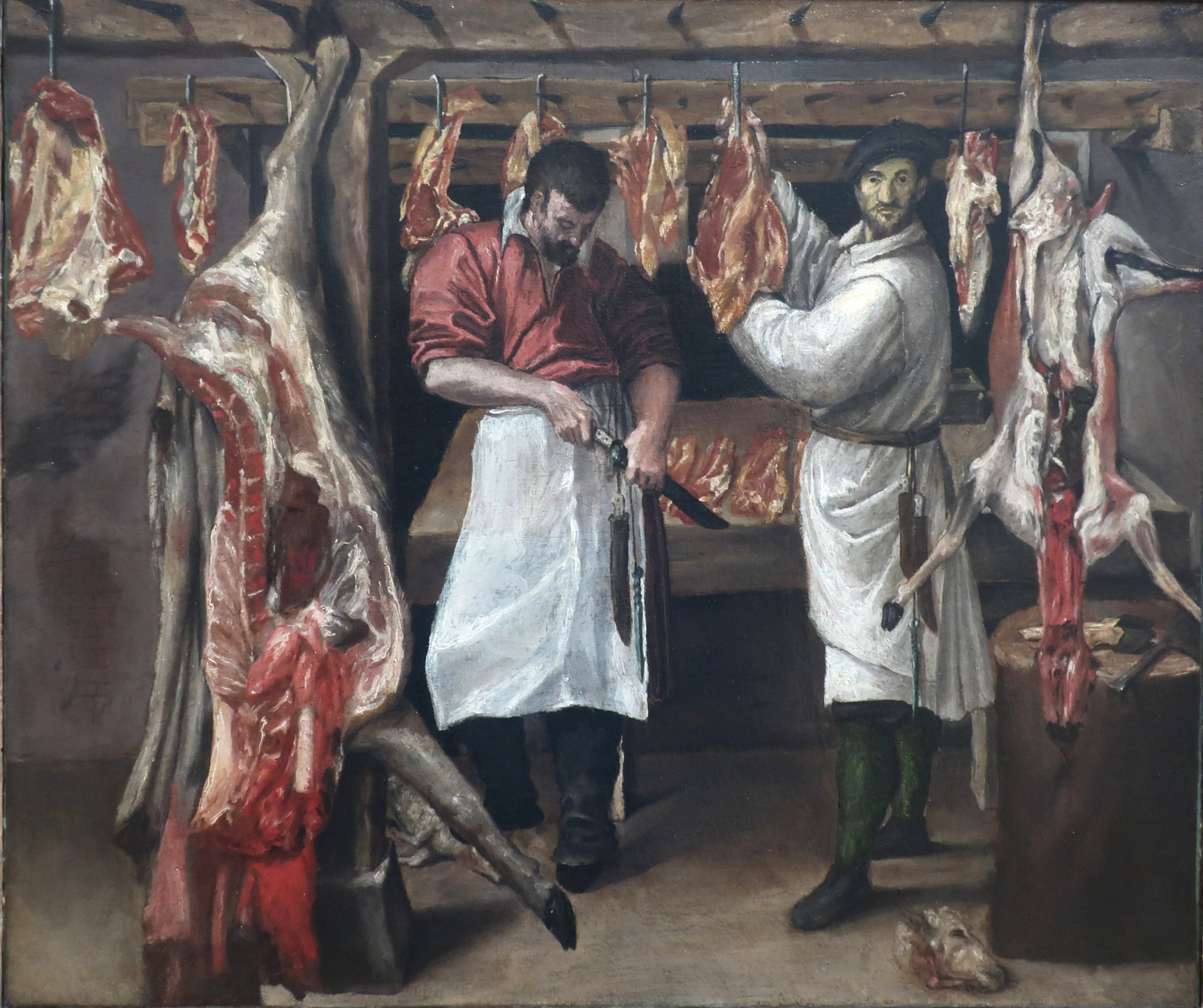
Annibale Carracci, The Butcher's Shop, 1580

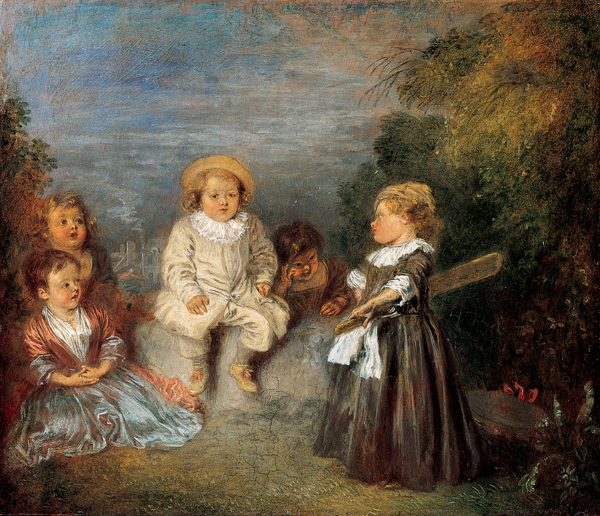
Jean-Antoine Watteau, Happy Age! Golden Age, 1716–1720

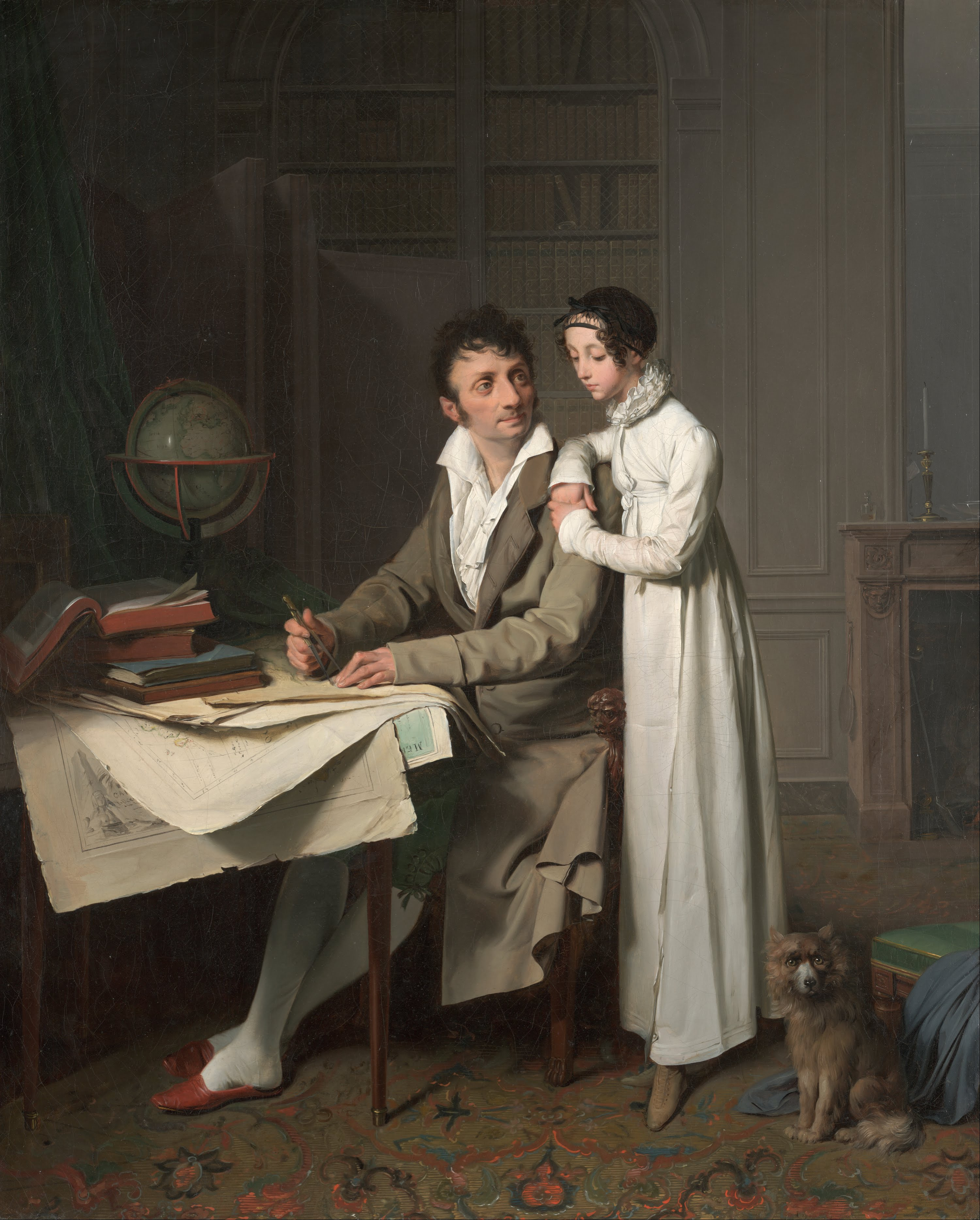
Louis-Léopold Boilly, The Geography Lesson, 1812

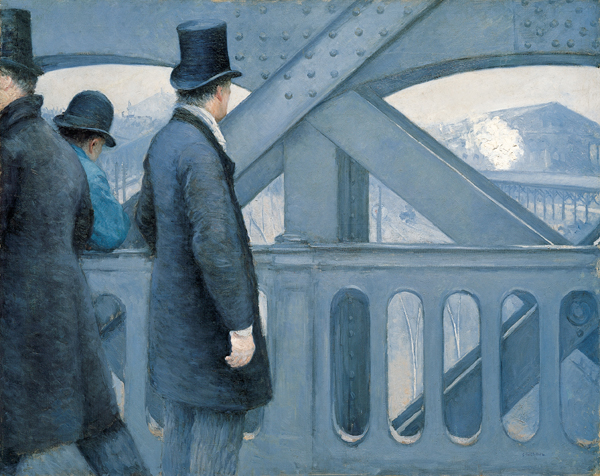
Gustave Caillebotte, On the Pont de l’Europe, 1876–1877
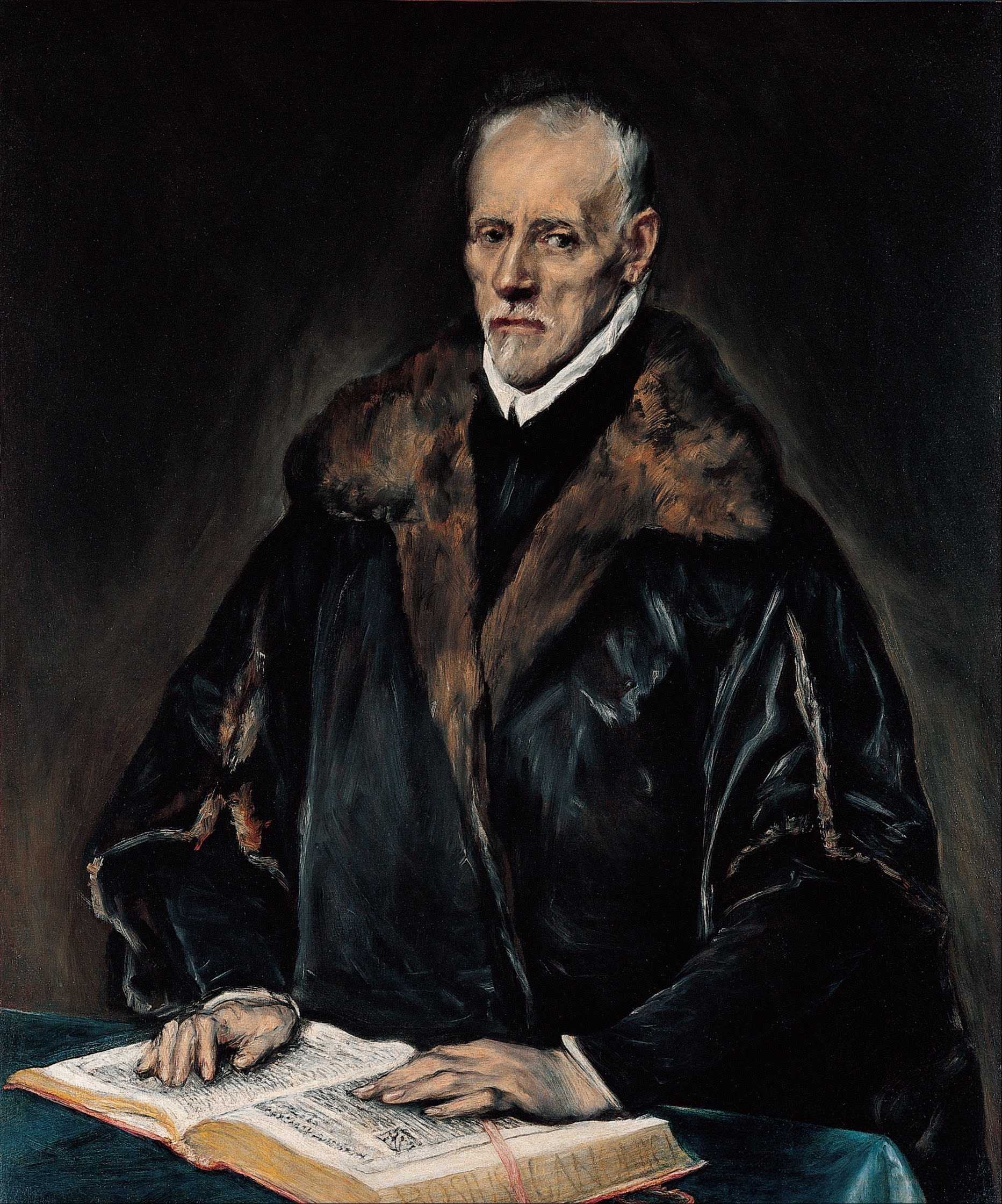
El Greco, Portrait of Dr Francisco de Pisa, c. 1610–1614

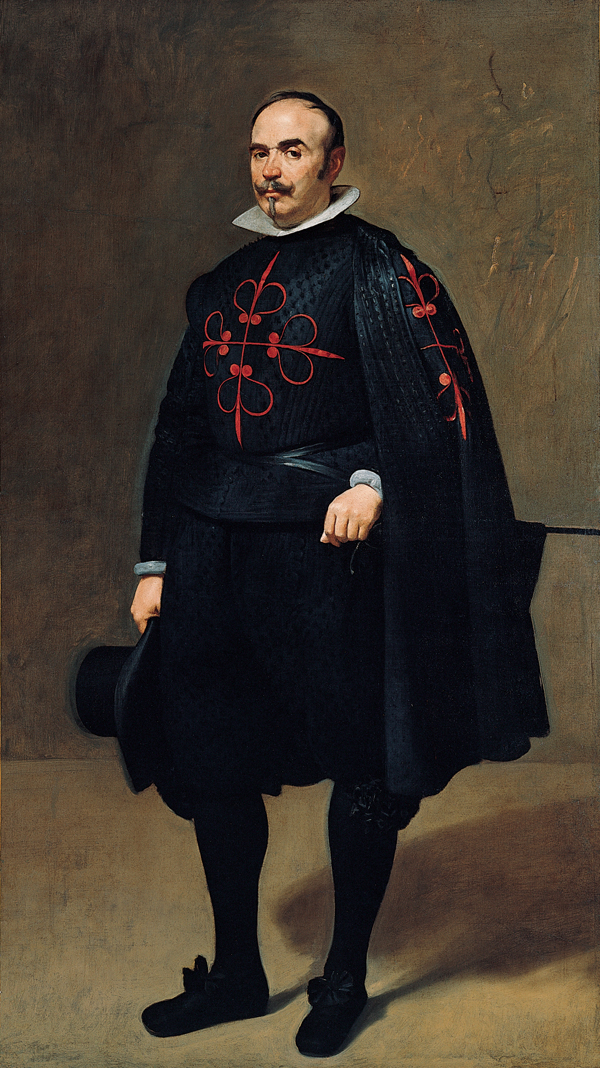
Diego Velázquez, Portrait of Don Pedro de Barberana, 1632

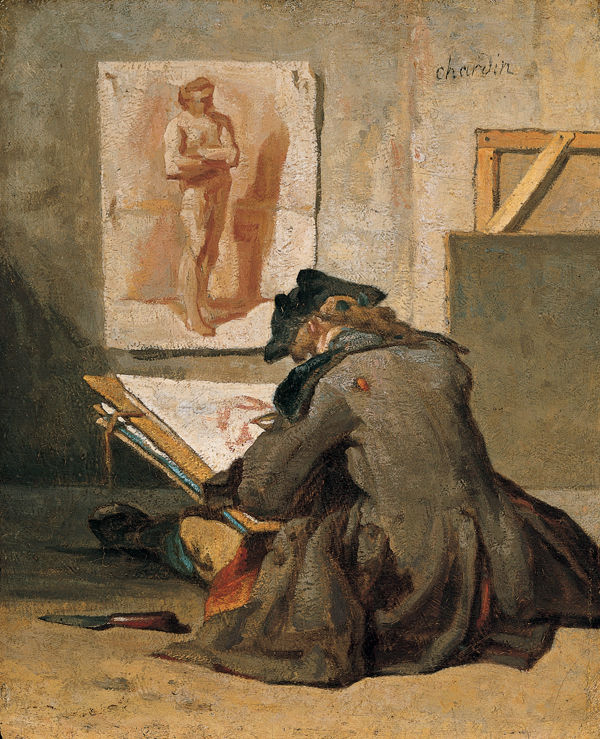
Jean Siméon Chardin, Young Student Drawing, c. 1738

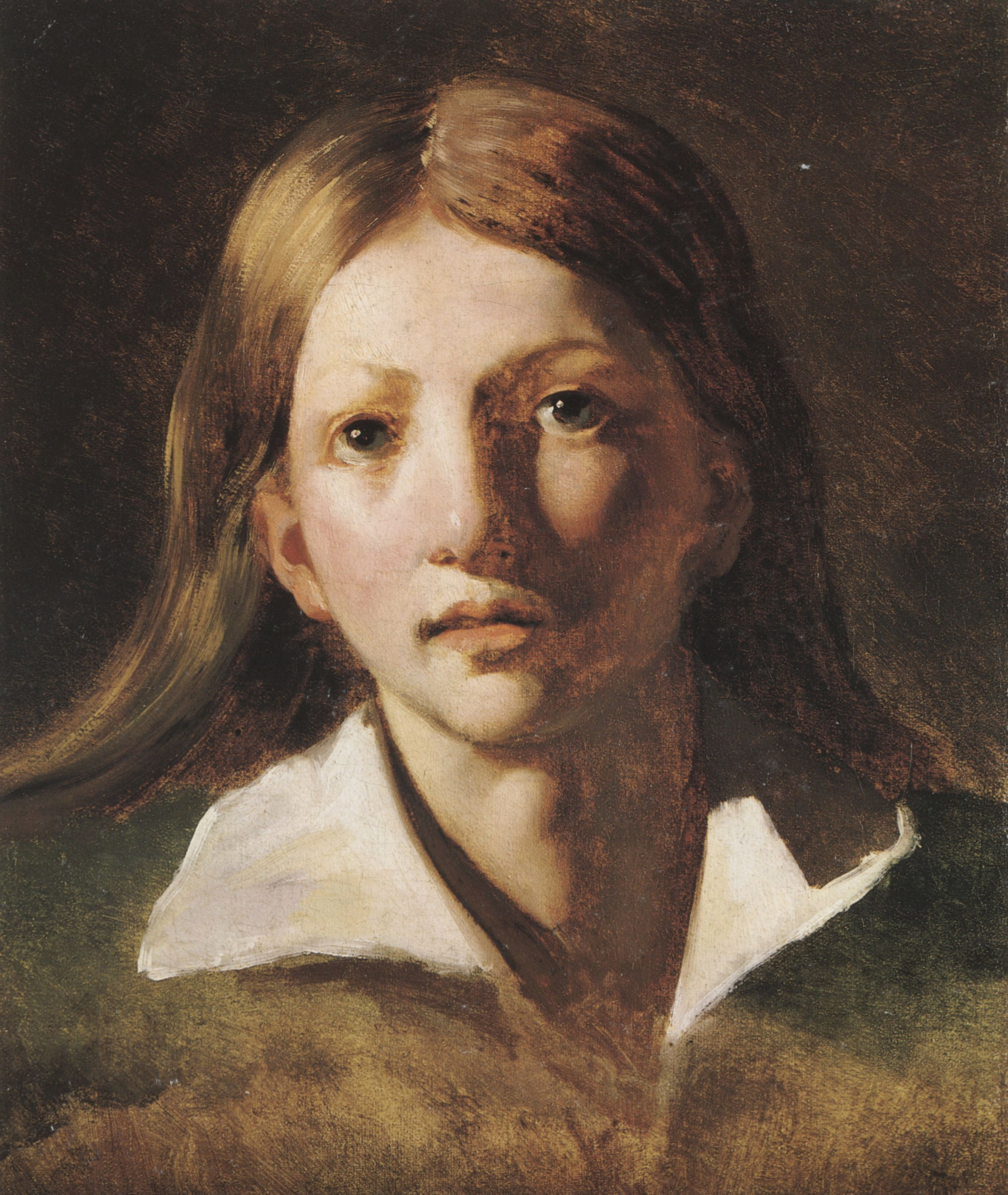
Théodore Géricault, Portrait of a Boy with Long Blond Hair, 1819–1820

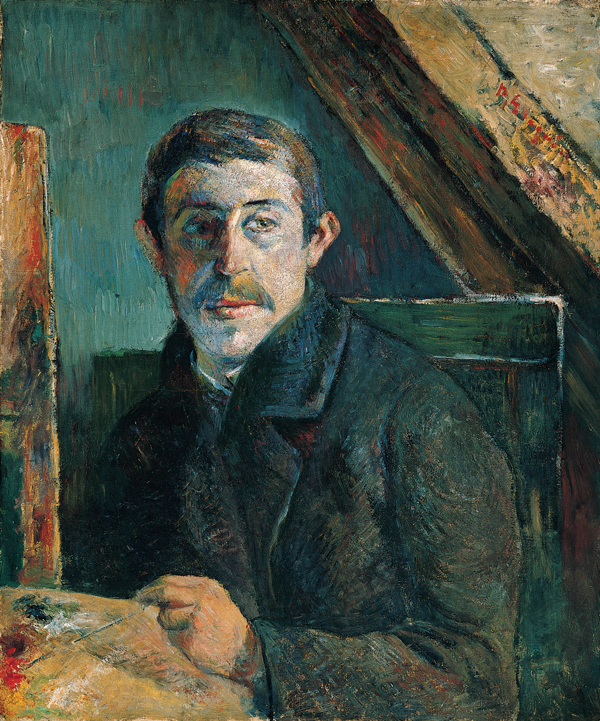
Paul Gauguin, Self-Portrait, 1885

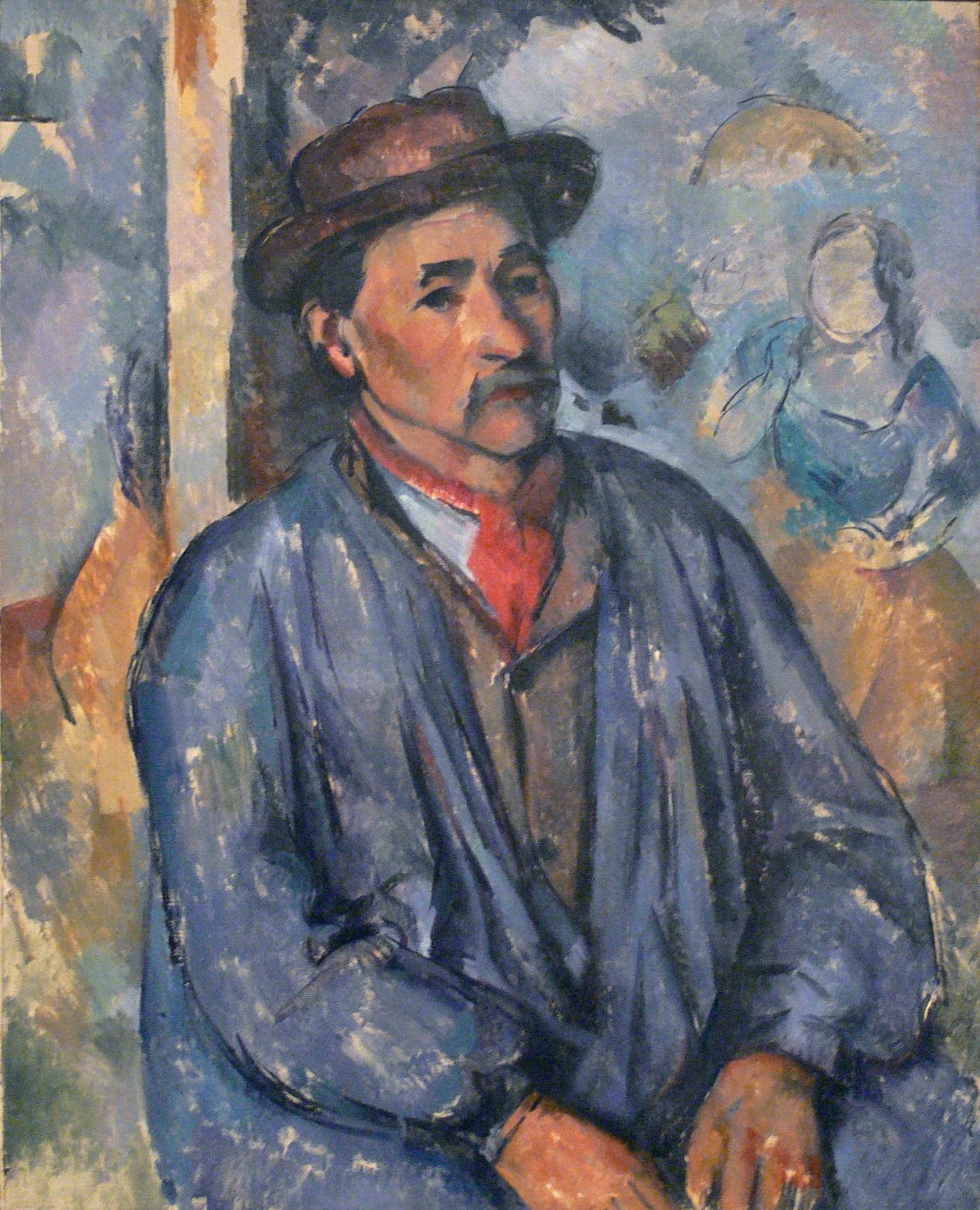
Paul Cézanne, Man in a Blue Smock, 1896–1897

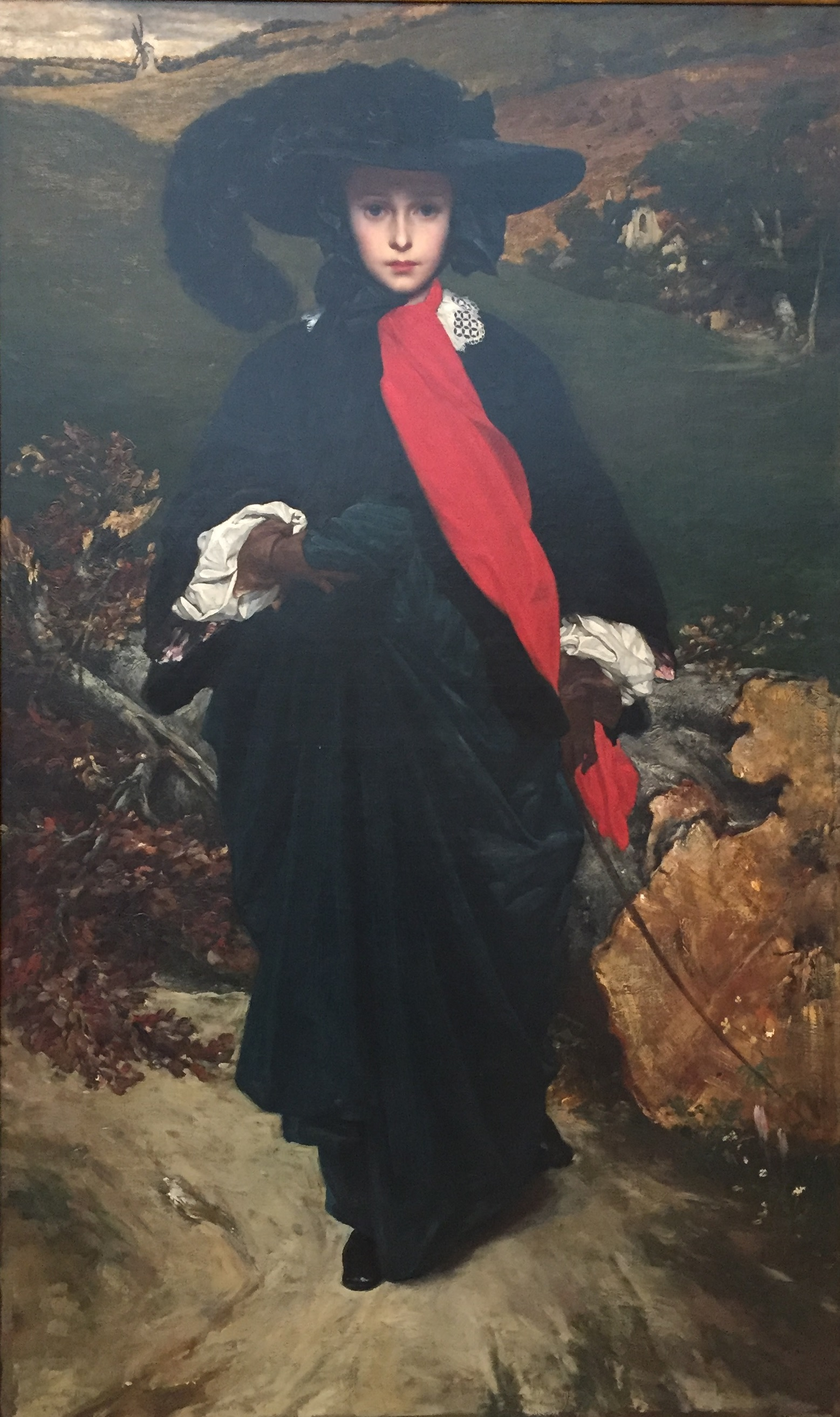
Frederic Leighton, Portrait of May Sartoris at about 15 years of age, 1860

== Asian collection highlights ==
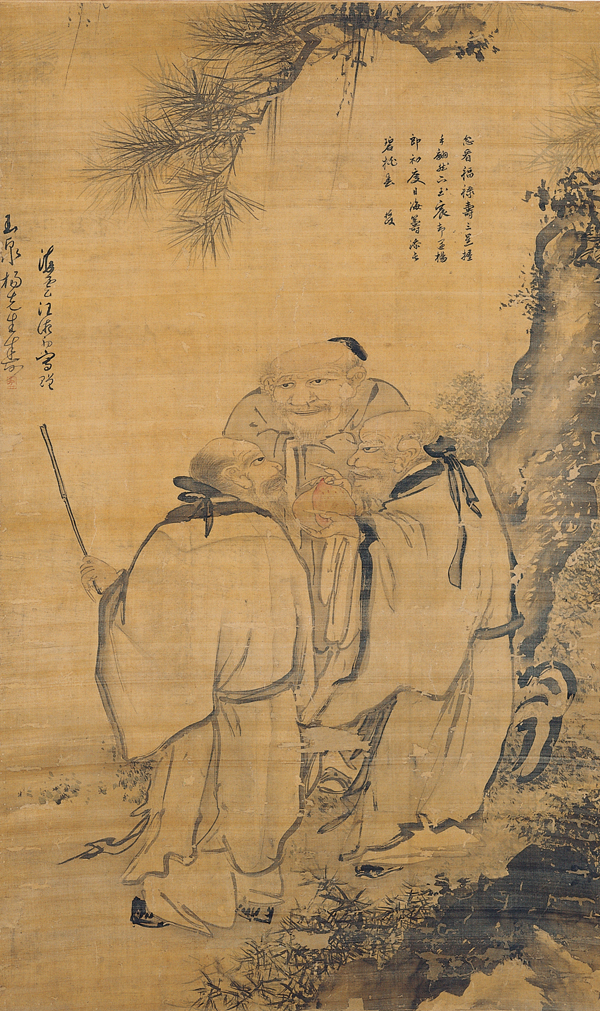
Wang Zhao, The Three Stars of Happiness, Wealth, and Longevity, c. 1500, Chinese, Ming dynasty, ink and light colors on silk

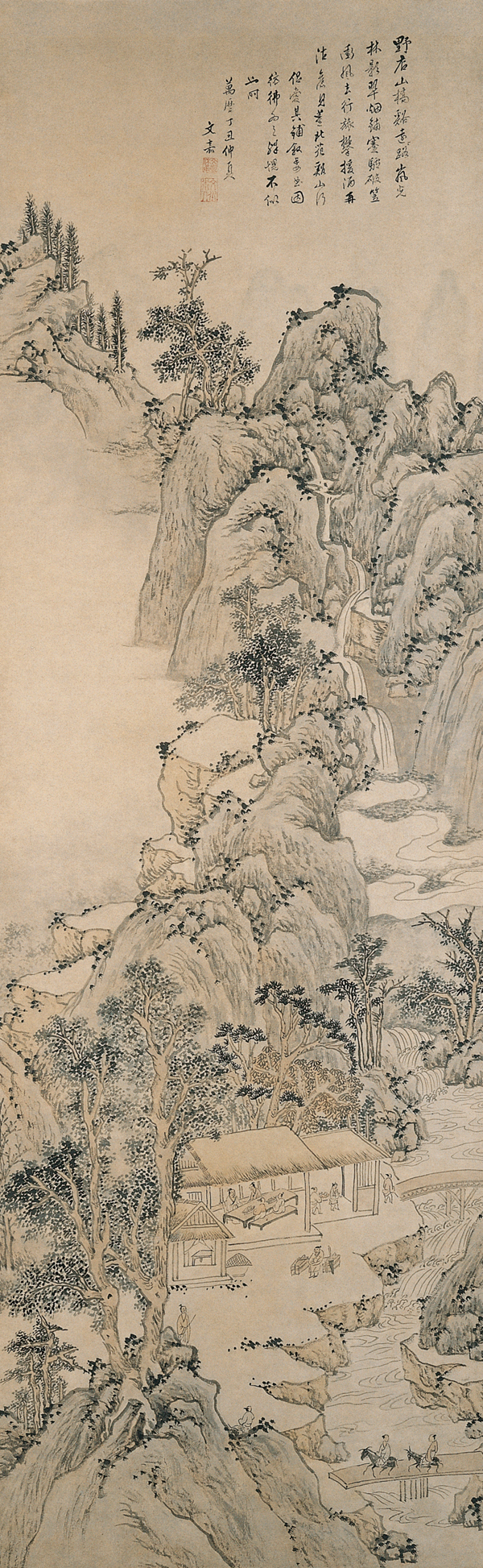
Wen Jia (Wen Chia), Landscape in the Style of Dong Yuan, 1577, Chinese, Ming dynasty (1368–1644)

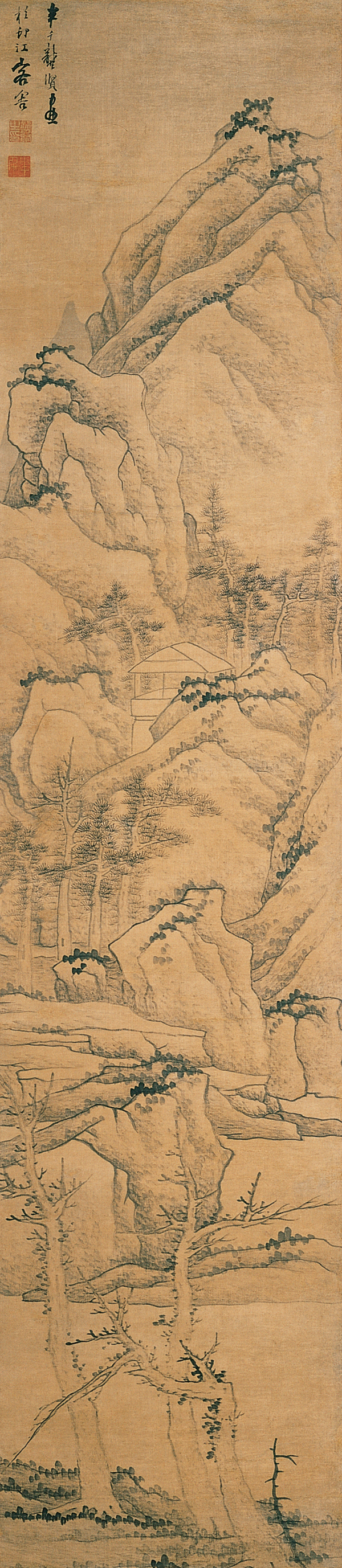
Gong Xian, Landscape, c. 1650, ink on silk painting, Chinese, Qing dynasty (1644–1911)

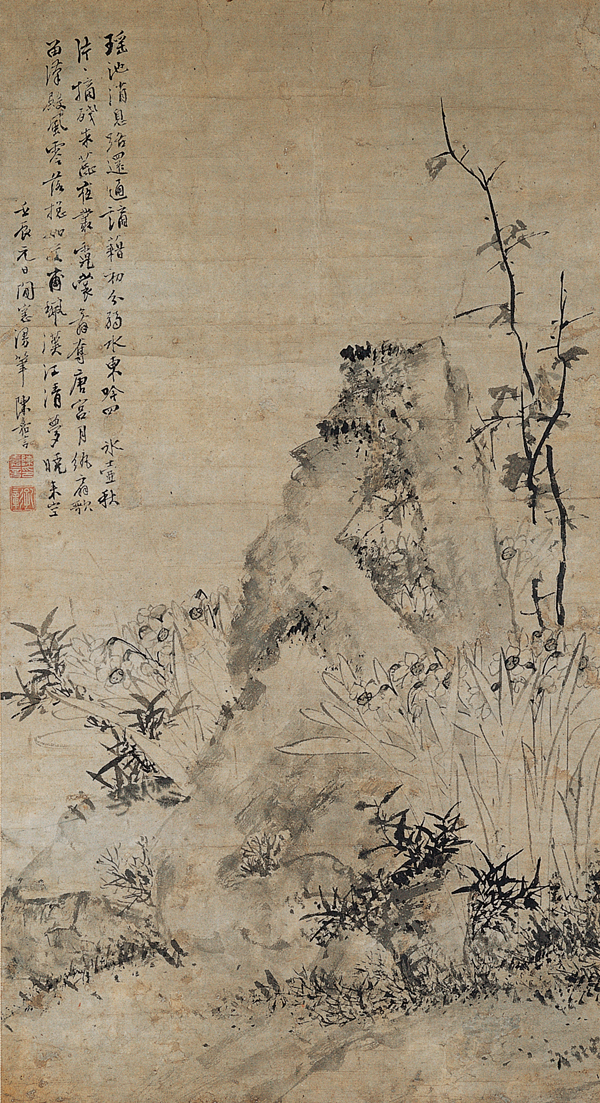
Chen Jiayen, Bamboo, Rock, and Narcissus, 1652, Chinese, Qing dynasty (1644–1911), Hanging scroll; ink on paper

== Management ==
The Kimbell Art Museum derives around 65% of its $12 million budget from its unrestricted endowment of more than $400 million. The endowment fell from $466 million to $398 million during the 2008 financial crisis. The museum has no special funds for acquisitions. Museum membership is at 15,000. In 2019, the museum appointed Guillaume Kientz as the curator of European art; he had previously worked in the Louvre.

== See also ==
- Amon Carter Museum
- Modern Art Museum of Fort Worth
