= 1826 in art =

Events in the year 1826 in Art.

== Events ==
- 1 May – Royal Academy Exhibition of 1826 opens at Somerset House in London
- December 25 – Opening of the Military Gallery of the Winter Palace, containing 332 portraits of generals who took part in the Patriotic War of 1812, painted by George Dawe and his Russian assistants Alexander Polyakov and Wilhelm August Golicke.
- Samuel Palmer moves to Shoreham, Kent, where he stays for the next decade.

== Works ==
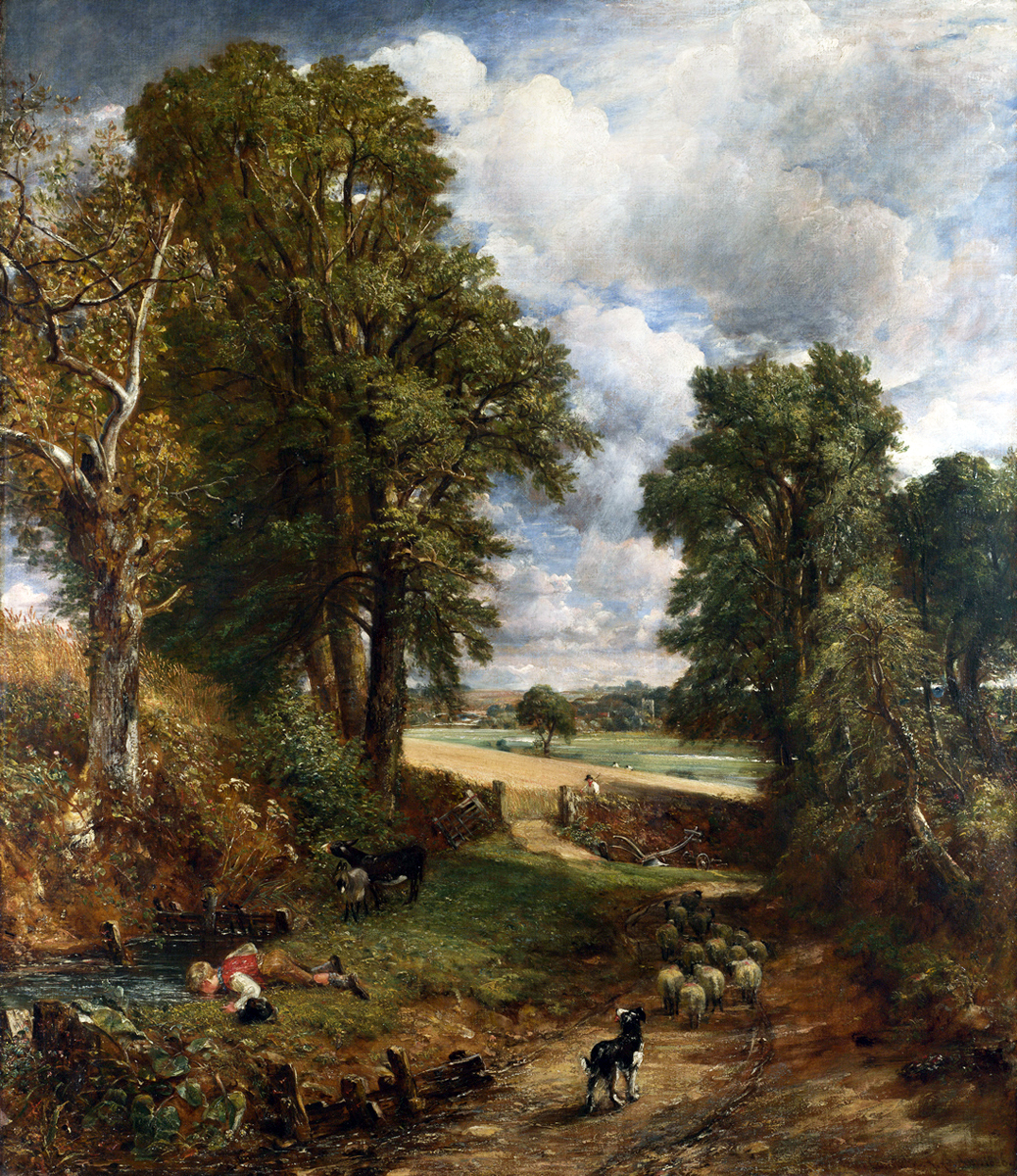
John Constable – The Cornfield

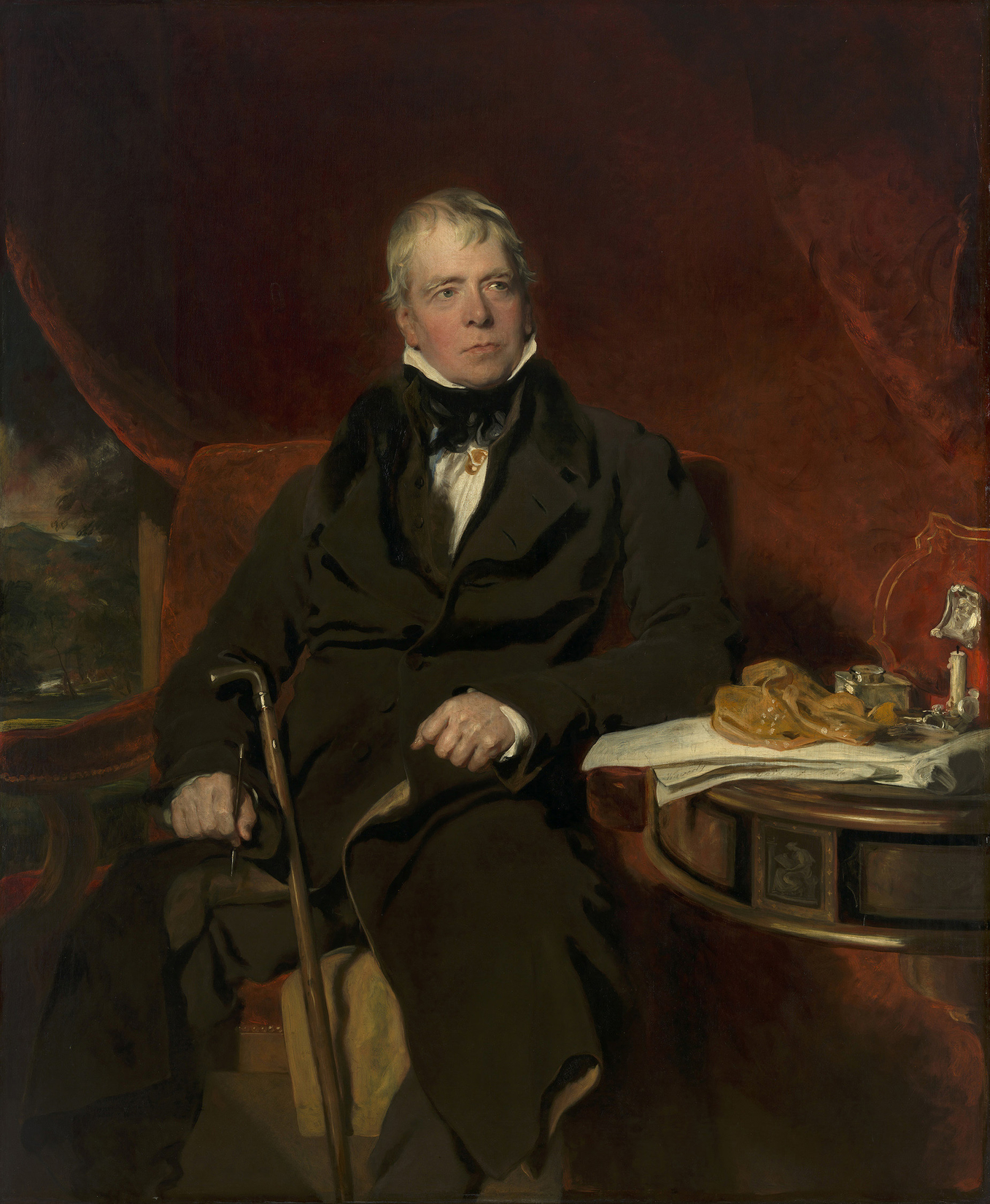
Thomas Lawrence – Portrait of Sir Walter Scott.

- Richard Parkes Bonington
  - The Pont des Arts, Paris
  - On the Adriatic
- Léon Cogniet – The Italian Brigand's Wife
- Thomas Cole
  - Kaaterskill Falls
  - Sunrise in the Catskill Mountains
- John Constable
  - A Boat Passing a Lock
  - The Cornfield
  - Parham Mill
- Jean-Baptiste-Camille Corot – The Bridge at Narni
- Eugène Delacroix –
  - The Execution of the Doge Marino Faliero (completed)
  - Greece on the Ruins of Missolonghi
- Eugène Devéria – The Reading of Mary Stuart's Sentence
- William Etty – The Judgement of Paris
- Francesco Hayez - Lampugnani's Conspiracy
- Benjamin Robert Haydon – Alexander the Great Taming Bucephalus
- Orest Kiprensky
  - Portrait of Prince N. P. Trubetzkoy
  - Portrait of O. A. Ryumina
- Edwin Landseer – The Hunting of Chevy Chase
- Thomas Lawrence
  - Portrait of George Canning
  - Portrait of Sir Walter Scott
- Samuel Morse – Portrait of the Marquis de Lafayette
- Alexander Nasmyth – A Prospect of London
- Nicéphore Niépce – View from the Window at Le Gras, the first permanent photograph of a natural subject
- James Northcote – Ira Aldridge as Othello
- Joseph Denis Odevaere – Lord Byron on his Death-bed (Groeningemuseum)
- Samuel Palmer – Self-portrait
- Ary Scheffer – The Retreat of Napoleon's Army from Russia
- Clarkson Stanfield –
  - The Banks of the Rhine in Cologne
  - A Market Boat on the Scheldt
- J. M. W. Turner
  - Cologne, the Arrival of a Packet Boat in the Evening
  - Forum Romanum
  - Mortlake Terrace
- Horace Vernet – The Crossing of the Arcole Bridge
- Henry Voordecker – Hunter's Home

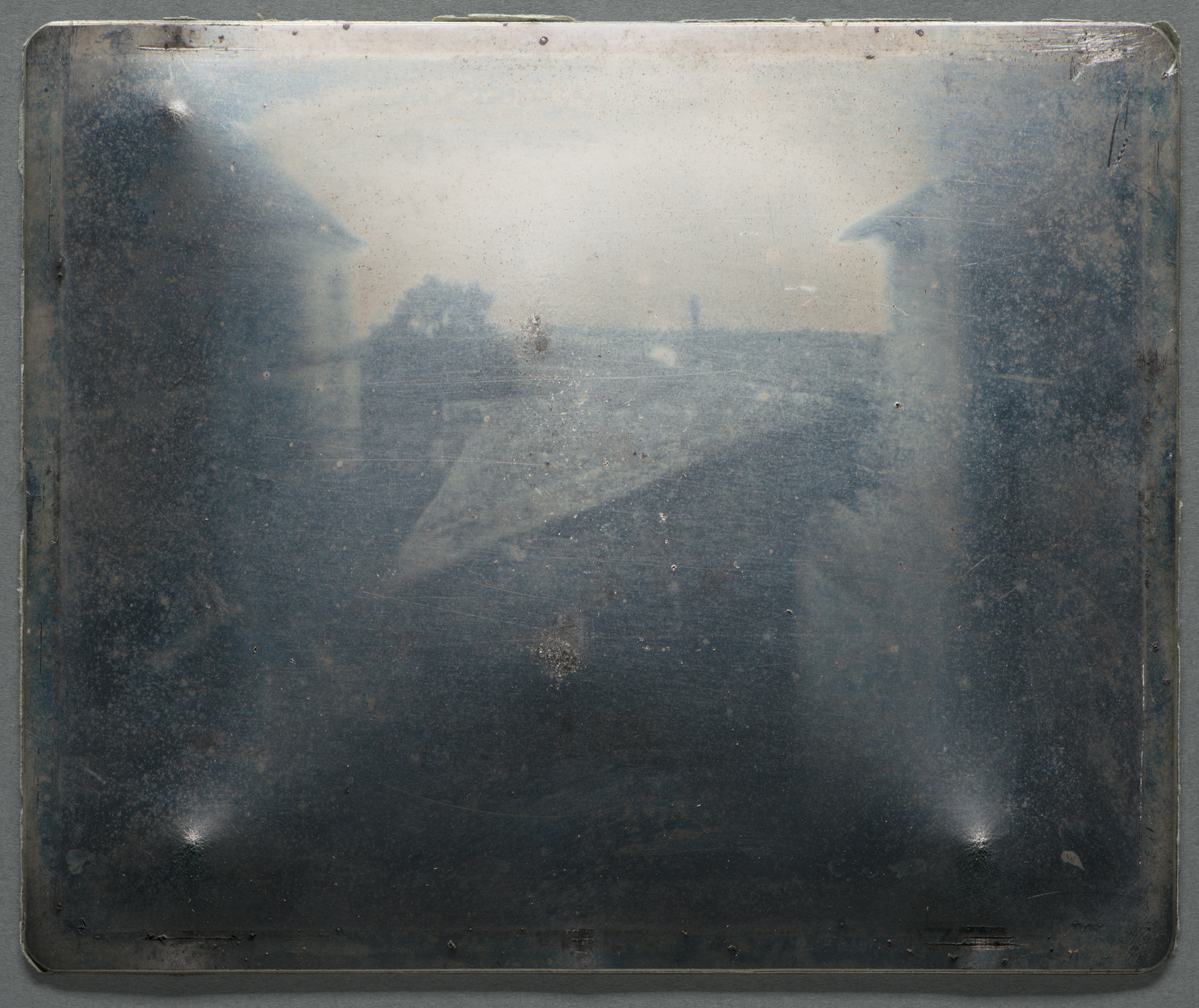
Nicéphore Niépce – View from the Window at Le Gras, the first permanent photograph of a natural subject

== Births ==
- February 18 – Lea Ahlborn, Swedish engraver (died 1897)
- March – Serafino De Tivoli, Italian painter (died 1892)
- March 6 – Annie Feray Mutrie, British painter (died 1893)
- March 25 – Wilhelmina Lagerholm, Swedish photographer (died 1917)
- April 6 – Gustave Moreau, French Symbolist painter (died 1898)
- May 2 – Eleuterio Pagliano, Italian Romantic painter (died 1903)
- May 4 – Frederic Edwin Church, American landscape painter (died 1900)
- May 11 – Ludovic Piette, French impressionist painter (died 1878)
- June 8 – Thomas Faed, Scottish genre painter (died 1900)
- September 24 – George Price Boyce, English Pre-Raphaelite watercolour landscape painter (died 1897)
- October 1 – Karl von Piloty, German painter (died 1886)
- November 11 – Elise Arnberg, Swedish miniaturist and photographer (died 1891)
- December 8 – Silvestro Lega, Italian painter (died 1895)
- date unknown
  - William Linnell, British painter (died 1906)
  - Novak Radonić, Serbian painter (died 1890)
  - Madame Virot, French fashion designer (died 1911)

== Deaths ==
- January 25 – Joseph Boze, French portrait and miniature painter (born 1746)
- February 21 – John Kay, Scottish caricaturist (born 1750)
- March 5 – Charles Paul Landon, French painter and writer on art and artists (born 1760)
- March 17 – Ferdinand Bauer, Austrian botanical illustrator (born 1760)
- July 23 – Marie-Élisabeth Laville-Leroux, French painter (born 1770)
- October 8
  - Marie-Guillemine Benoist, French neoclassical, historical and genre painter (born 1768)
  - George Garrard, English artist (born 1760)
- November 12 – Christian Gullager, Danish artist specializing in portraits and theatrical scenery (born 1759)
- November 26 – John Nichols, English printer and author (born 1745)
- December 7 – John Flaxman, English sculptor (born 1755)
- date unknown
  - Thomas Foster, Irish portrait painter (born 1798; suicide)
  - Jean-Louis Laneuville, French portrait painter (born 1748)
  - Andrey Yefimovich Martynov, Russian painter and engraver (born 1768)
  - Victor-Jean Nicolle, French landscape and architecture painter (born 1754)
  - Mustafa Râkim, Ottoman calligrapher (born 1757)
  - Peter Edward Stroehling, portrait artist from either Germany or the Russian Empire (born 1768)
