= Francis I, Charles V and the Duchess of Étampes =

Painting by Richard Parkes Bonington

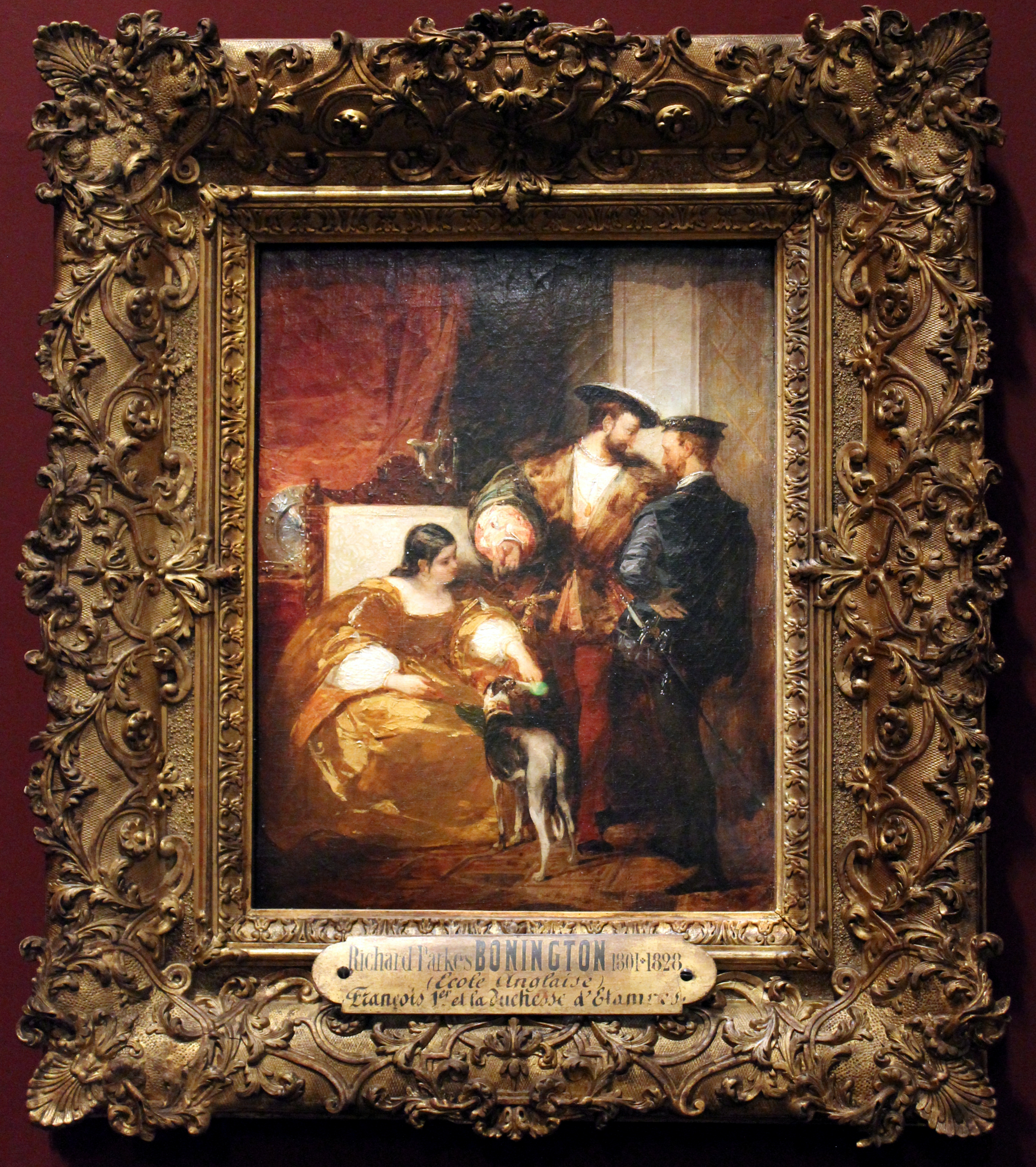
- Artist: Richard Parkes Bonington
- Year: c.1827
- Dimensions: 34 cm × 26 cm (13 in × 10 in)
- Location: Louvre, Paris

Francis I, Charles V and the Duchess of Étampes is an history painting by Richard Parkes Bonington, from c. 1827.

It shows Charles V, Holy Roman Emperor, Francis I of France and Anne de Pisseleu d'Heilly. It is held in the Louvre, in Paris. It was lent to the Musée des beaux-arts de Lyon for its 2014 exhibition L'invention du Passé. Histoires de cœur et d'épée 1802-1850..
