= François Louis Thomas Francia =

French painter (1772–1839)

Boulogne Harbour, watercolour, 22.5 x 48.3 cm, Yale

A Mountain Stream, 1801, Yale Center for British Art

François Louis Thomas Francia (1772–1839) was a French watercolour painter born in Calais and famous for his shore landscapes. He spent much of the earlier part of his life in England, before returning to France in 1817, and can be counted among the English painters of the "Golden Age of Watercolour". The English watercolour painter Richard Parkes Bonington was his pupil in Calais, his family having moved there when he was a child.

He was one of the earliest and most accomplished of English watercolourists, and his works are distinguished by their fine colour and poetical feeling.

== Life ==
Francia was born at Calais on 21 December 1772, and was taken early in life to London by his father, a refugee. He was for some time employed as an assistant of a drawing-master named Barrow, who was the master of John Varley. He showed a total of 85 works at the Royal Academy between 1795 and 1821 (inclusive).

He was one of the sketching society formed by Thomas Girtin about 1799, and there is drawing of a moonlit landscape in the Victoria and Albert Museum dated in May of that year.

The Pont de la Concorde and Tuileries Palace from the Cours la Reine (Paris), 1827, Yale Center for British Art

He was a member of the (now Royal) Society of Painters in Water-Colours, and for some time its secretary, but he resigned his membership, and became in 1816 an unsuccessful candidate for the associateship of the Royal Academy.

The Watermill Above the Bridge at Charenton, Yale Center for British Art

The next year he retired to Calais, where he lived until his death on 5 February 1839. It was here that he gave lessons to Richard Parkes Bonington, whose coast scenes bear much resemblance to the later works of Francia.

Francia's earlier drawings are broad and simple in execution, rich, but sombre in colour, like those of Girtin; but his later work, while still retaining its breadth and harmony, is brighter and lighter in tone, and more subtle in handling.

Though he painted landscape of different kinds, his favourite subjects were shore scenes, which he executed with great truth and beauty of aerial effect. He was an excellent draughtsman of boats and shipping, and some of his drawings were engraved to illustrate a book of sketches of shipping by Edward William Cooke.

He wrote a short book (32 pages) A series of progressive lessons, intended to elucidate the art of flower painting in water colours (1815), illustrated with 12 lithograph plates, hand-coloured in many copies. In 1810, he published a volume of reproductive prints Studies of Landscapes by T. Gainsborough, J. Hoppner, R.A., T. Girtin, &c., imitated from the originals by L. F.

== Collections ==
There are several of his drawings at the Victoria and Albert Museum, and a few at the British Museum. The Yale Center for British Art probably has the largest collection, listing 29 works.

The Musee des Beaux-Arts, Calais had an exhibition, "Louis Francia 1772-1839", dedicated to him in 1989.
