= French Coast with Fishermen =

Painting by Richard Parkes Bonington

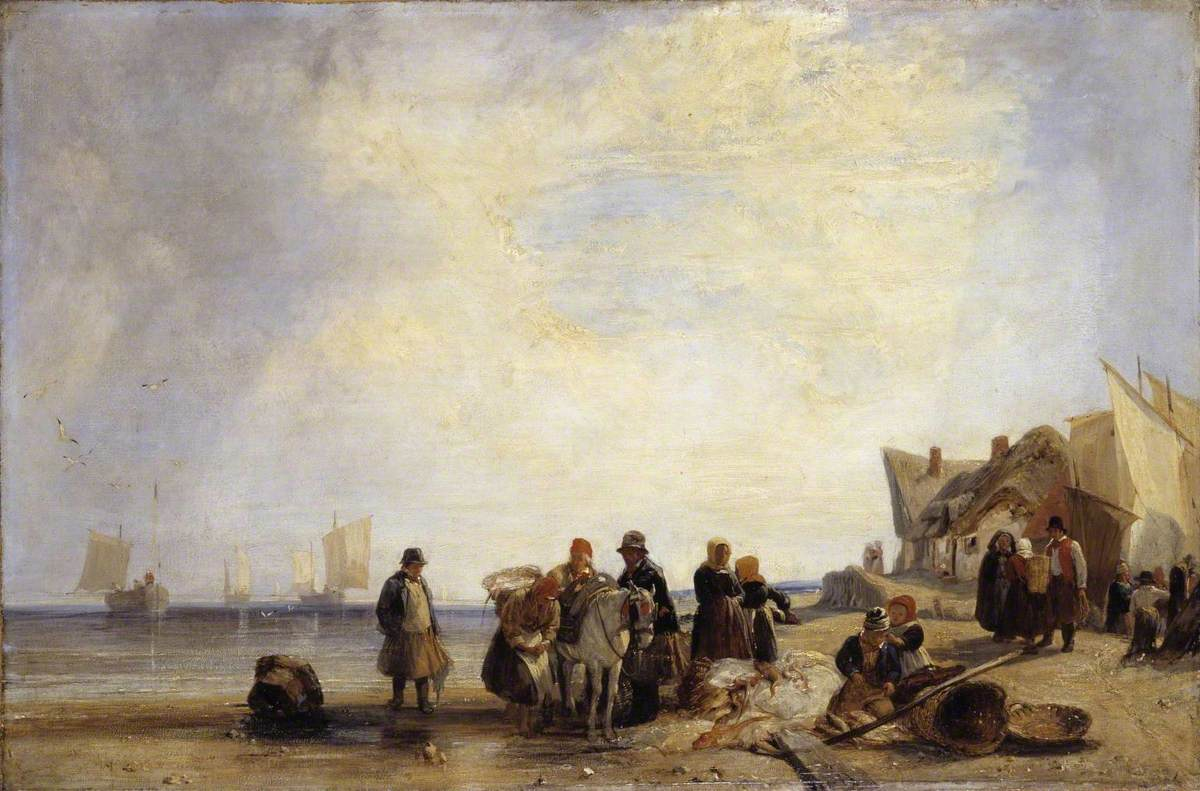
- Artist: Richard Parkes Bonington
- Year: c. 1824
- Type: Oil on canvas, landscape painting
- Dimensions: 96.7 cm × 64.3 cm (38.1 in × 25.3 in)
- Location: Tate Britain; London

French Coast with Fishermen is a c.1824 oil painting by the British artist Richard Parkes Bonington, blending elements of marine landscape and genre painting.

== History and description ==
The work was likely to have been one of the pictures Bonington displayed at the Salon of 1824 at the Louvre in Paris for which he won a gold medal and established his name in France.

In February 1826 it was displayed at the exhibition of the British Institution in London successfully introducing his painting to audiences in his native country where he was still almost entirely unknown. A myth developed that his work was initially mistaken by the London newspapers for that of the more established artist William Collins, who painted similar subjects. Today the painting is in the collection of the Tate Britain in Pimlico, having been acquired in 2004.

== Bibliography ==
- Cambridge, Matt. Richard Parkes Bonington: Young and Romantic. Nottingham Castle, 2002.
- Cormack, Malcolm. Bonnington. Phaidon Press, 1989.
- Noon, Patrick & Bann, Stephen. Constable to Delacroix: British Art and the French Romantics. Tate, 2003.
