= Venice, Ducal Palace with a Religious Procession =

Painting by Richard Parkes Bonington

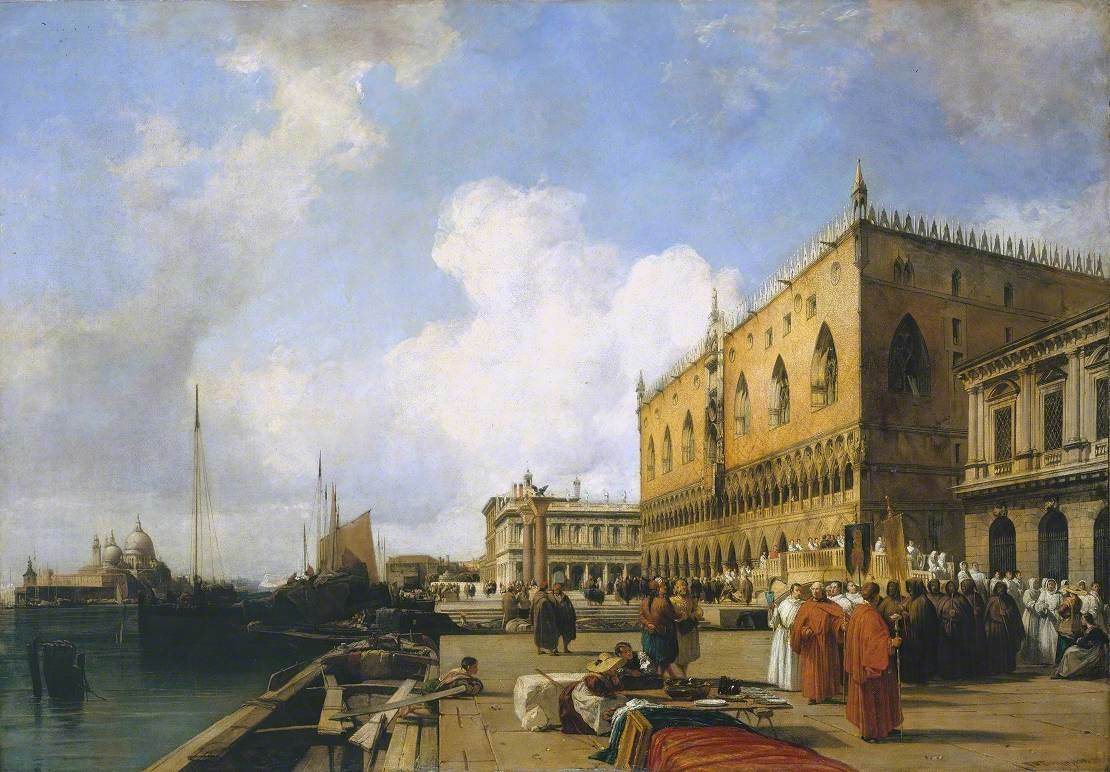
- Artist: Richard Parkes Bonington
- Year: 1828
- Type: Oil on canvas, cityscape
- Dimensions: 114.3 cm × 162.6 cm (45.0 in × 64.0 in)
- Location: Tate Britain, London

Venice, Ducal Palace with a Religious Procession is an 1828 cityscape painting by the British artist Richard Parkes Bonington. Bonington visited Venice in Spring 1826 and the trip inspired him to produce a number of works up to his death in 1828. It is the largest known painting he produced. It was exhibited at the Royal Academy's Summer Exhibition of 1828 to critical acclaim. It is now in the collection of Tate Britain in Pimlico, having been acquired in 1947.

== Bibliography ==
- Cormack, Malcolm. Bonnington. Phaidon Press, 1989.
- Stainton, Lindsay. Turner's Venice. British Museum, 1985.
