= Ruins of the Abbey Saint Bertin =

Painting by Richard Parkes Bonington

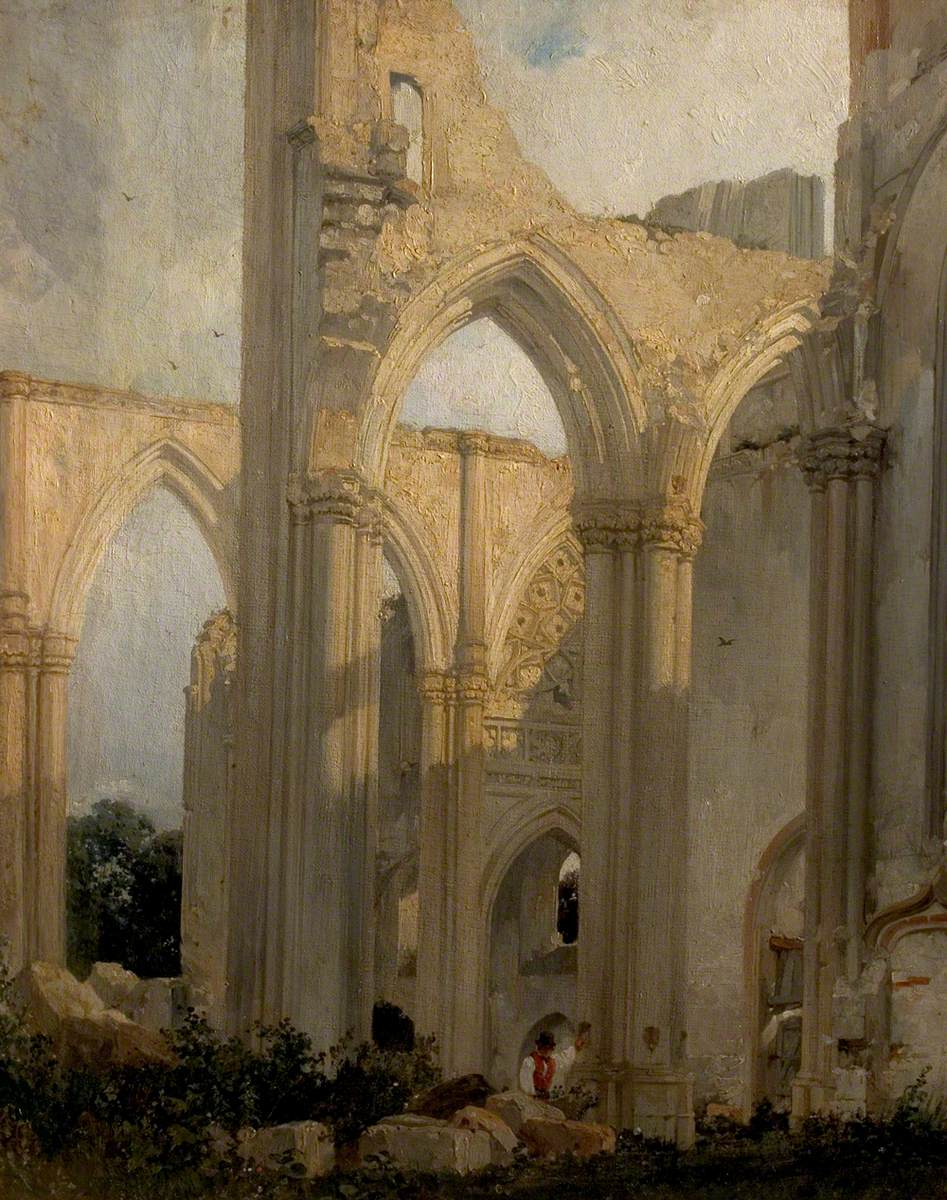
- Artist: Richard Parkes Bonington
- Year: c. 1824
- Type: Oil on canvas, landscape painting
- Dimensions: 59.9 cm × 48.8 cm (23.6 in × 19.2 in)
- Location: Nottingham Castle; Nottingham

Ruins of the Abbey Saint Bertin is a c.1824 landscape painting by the British artist Richard Parkes Bonington. It portrays the ruins of Abbey of Saint Bertin near Saint Omer in northern France. It shows the transept of the old abbey. The red figure in the foreground may be intended as a workman come to take away the stones for other uses. Saint Omer was a popular destination for artis during the period due to its medieval buildings.

Bonington was a young Nottinghamshire-born painter who became known primarily for painting landscapes of France and Italy. A significant figure of the developing romantic movement, he died in 1828 at the age of twenty six from tuberculosis. Today the painting is in the collection of Nottingham Castle, having been acquired in 1907.

== Bibliography ==
- Cambridge, Matt. Richard Parkes Bonington: Young and Romantic. Nottingham Castle, 2002.
- Cormack, Malcolm. Bonnington. Phaidon Press, 1989.
