= A Distant View of St-Omer =

Painting by Richard Parkes Bonington

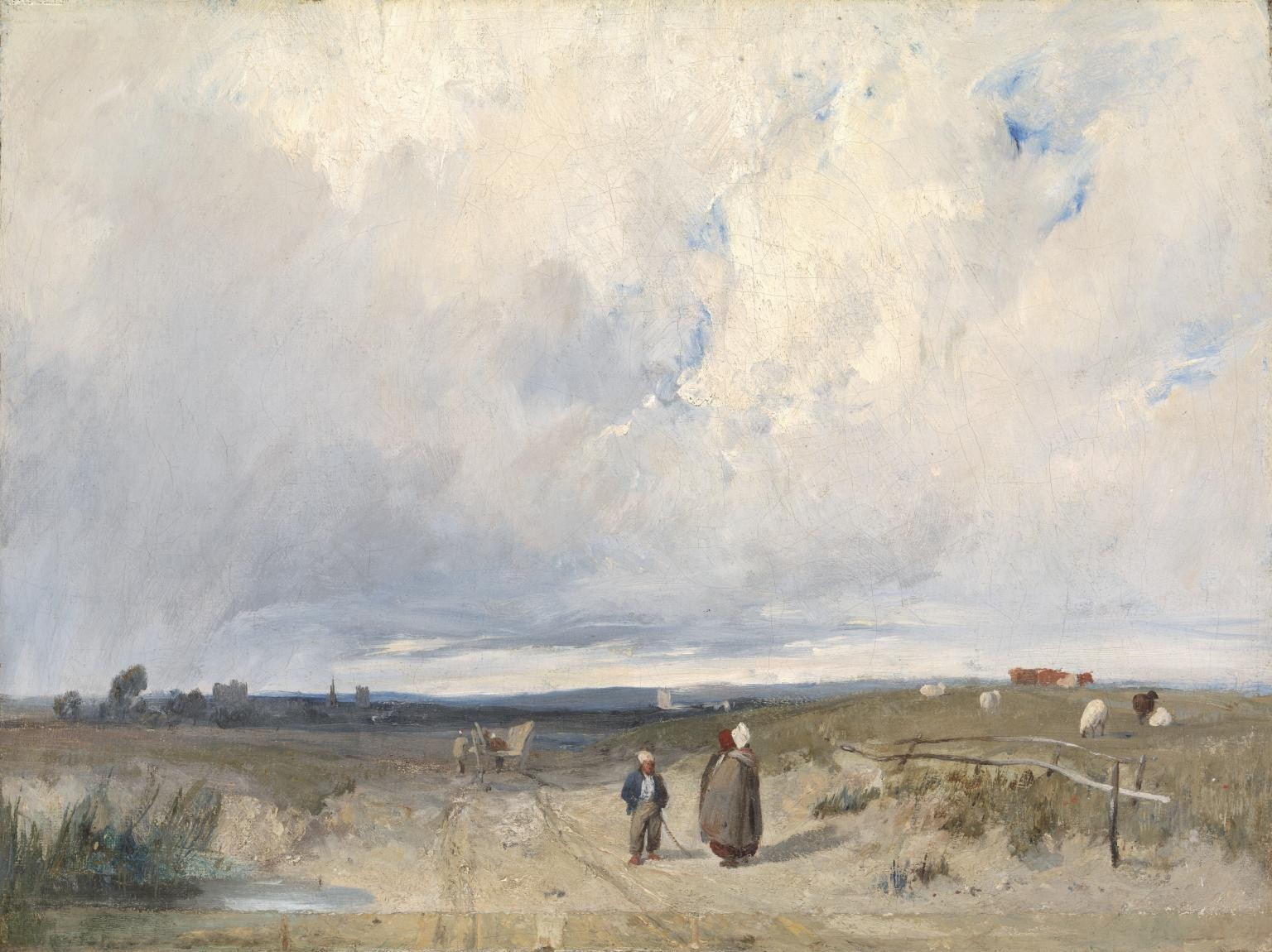
- Artist: Richard Parkes Bonington
- Year: c. 1824
- Type: Oil on canvas, landscape
- Dimensions: 31.4 cm × 43.8= cm (12.4 in ×)
- Location: Tate Britain, London

A Distant View of St-Omer is a c.1824 landscape painting by the British artist Richard Parkes Bonington. Bonington moved to France when he was fourteen and became known for his views of the French countryside and coasts. This painting depicts the town of Saint-Omer on River Aa in Picardy from a distance. A rural scene, the skyline of Saint-Omer and its taller, church buildings is dominated by the clouds and the near countryside.

The work is today in the collection of the Tate Britain in London having been acquired in 1910.

== Bibliography ==
- Bauer, Gérald. The Eloquence of Colour: The Genius of Bonington's Contemporaries. Clem Arts, 2003.
- Bury, Stephen (ed.) Benezit Dictionary of British Graphic Artists and Illustrators, Volume 1. OUP, 2012.
- Cormack, Malcolm. Bonnington. Phaidon Press, 1989.
- Ives, Colta Feller & Barker, Elizabeth E. ''Romanticism & the School of Nature: Nineteenth-century Drawings and Paintings from the Karen B. Cohen Collection. Metropolitan Museum of Art, 2000.
- Noon, Patrick & Bann, Stephen. Constable to Delacroix: British Art and the French Romantics. Tate, 2003.
