= Henri III and the English Ambassador =

Painting by Richard Parkes Bonington

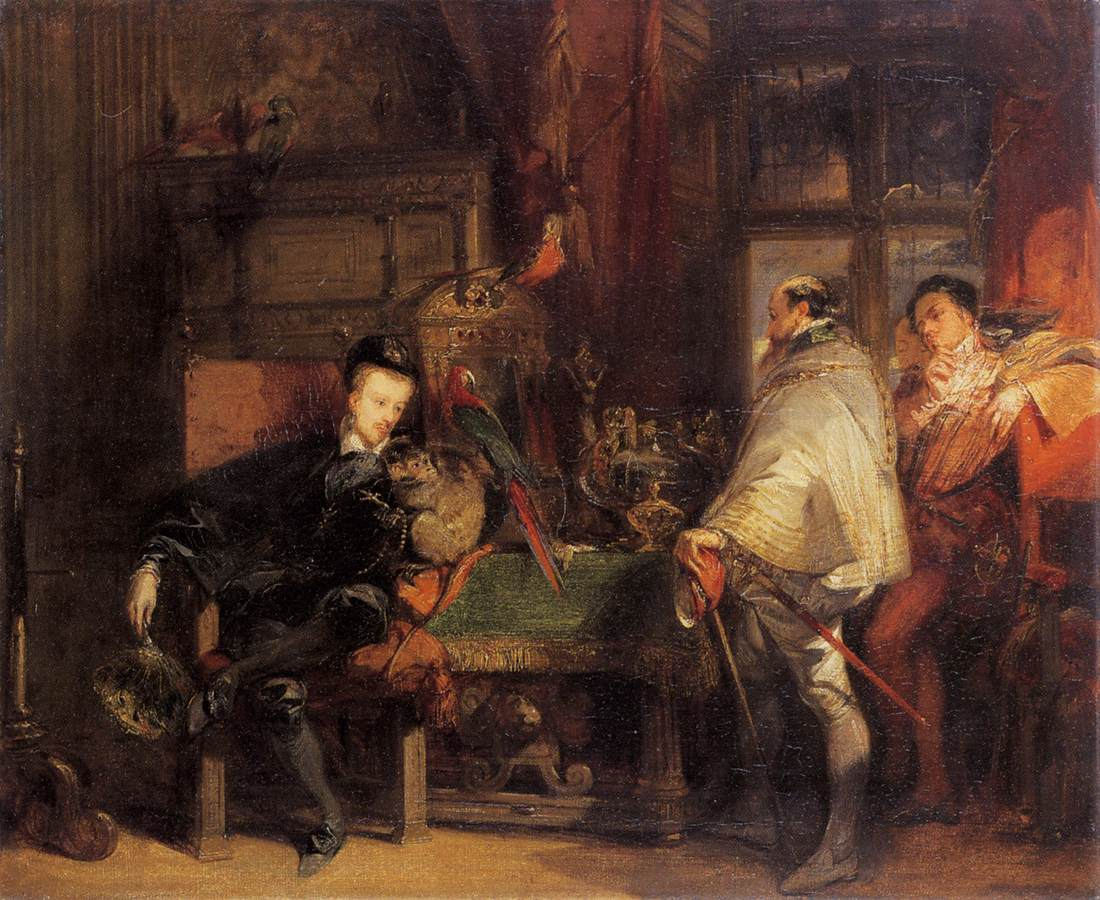
- Artist: Richard Parkes Bonington
- Year: 1827
- Type: Oil on canvas, history painting
- Dimensions: 54 cm × 64 cm (21 in × 25 in)
- Location: Wallace Collection, London

Henri III and the English Ambassador is an 1827 oil painting by the British-French artist Richard Parkes Bonington. A history painting in the Troubadour style, it depicts a scene when Henry III of France receives the envoy of Elizabeth I of England. The ambassador is surprised by the decadent, eccentric monarch, the latter of the Valois Dynasty, receiving him carrying a woman's feather fan in his hand. It was based on an authentic scene in which the English diplomatic encountered the French king at the Louvre surrounded by dogs, minions and parrots.

Bonington produced a number of scenes of French and British history during these years, inspired by the fashionable Romanticism and Antiquarianism of the period. The painting was displayed at the Royal Academy Exhibition of 1828 held at Somerset House, a few month's before Bonington's death at the age of twenty five. The painting was later acquired by the art collector the Marquess of Hertford in 1860 and now forms part of the Wallace Collection in London.

It should not be confused with another painting by Bonington produced around the same time, Henri IV and the Spanish Ambassador depicting a later French monarch, that was exhibited at the Salon of 1827 and which is also in the Wallace Collection.

== Bibliography ==
- Cambridge, Matt. Richard Parkes Bonington: Young and Romantic. Nottingham Castle, 2002.
- Cormack, Malcolm. Bonnington. Phaidon Press, 1989.
- Noon, Patrick & Bann, Stephen. Constable to Delacroix: British Art and the French Romantics. Tate, 2003.
- Strong, Roy. Painting the Past: The Victorian Painter and British History. Pimlico, 2004.
- Vesser, Harold. (Ed.); The New Historicism. Taylor & Francis, 2013.
