= The Château of the Duchess of Berry =

Painting by Richard Parkes Bonington

- Artist: Richard Parkes Bonington
- Year: c. 1825
- Type: Oil on canvas, landscape painting
- Dimensions: 37.5 cm × 52 cm (14.8 in × 20 in)
- Location: Nottingham Castle; Nottingham

The Château of the Duchess of Berry is an oil on canvas landscape painting by the British-born artist Richard Parkes Bonington, from c. 1825.

== History and description ==
It depicts the Château de Rosny-sur-Seine, a country estate located on the River Seine outside Paris. At the time the château belonged to the Italian Duchess of Berry. She was the widowed wife of the Duke of Berry, younger son of the Charles X, who had been assassinated in Paris in 1820. The Duchess was the mother of the Duke of Bordeaux, prospective heir to the French crown.

Bonington puts much of the focus of the painting on the sky, reducing the château to the distance. Jean-Baptiste-Camille Corot later produced a view that was more directly focused on the building. Today Bonington's painting is in the collection of Nottingham Castle in the English Midlands, having been accepted in lieu of inheritance tax in 2004.

== Bibliography ==
- Bauer, Gérald . The Eloquence of Colour: The Genius of Bonington's Contemporaries. Clem Arts, 2003.
- Cambridge, Matt. Richard Parkes Bonington: Young and Romantic. Nottingham Castle, 2002.
- Cormack, Malcolm. Bonnington. Phaidon Press, 1989.
- Skuy, David. Assassination, Politics, and Miracles: France and the Royalist Reaction of 1820. McGill-Queen's Press, 2003.
