= The Pont des Arts, Paris =

Painting by Richard Parkes Bonington

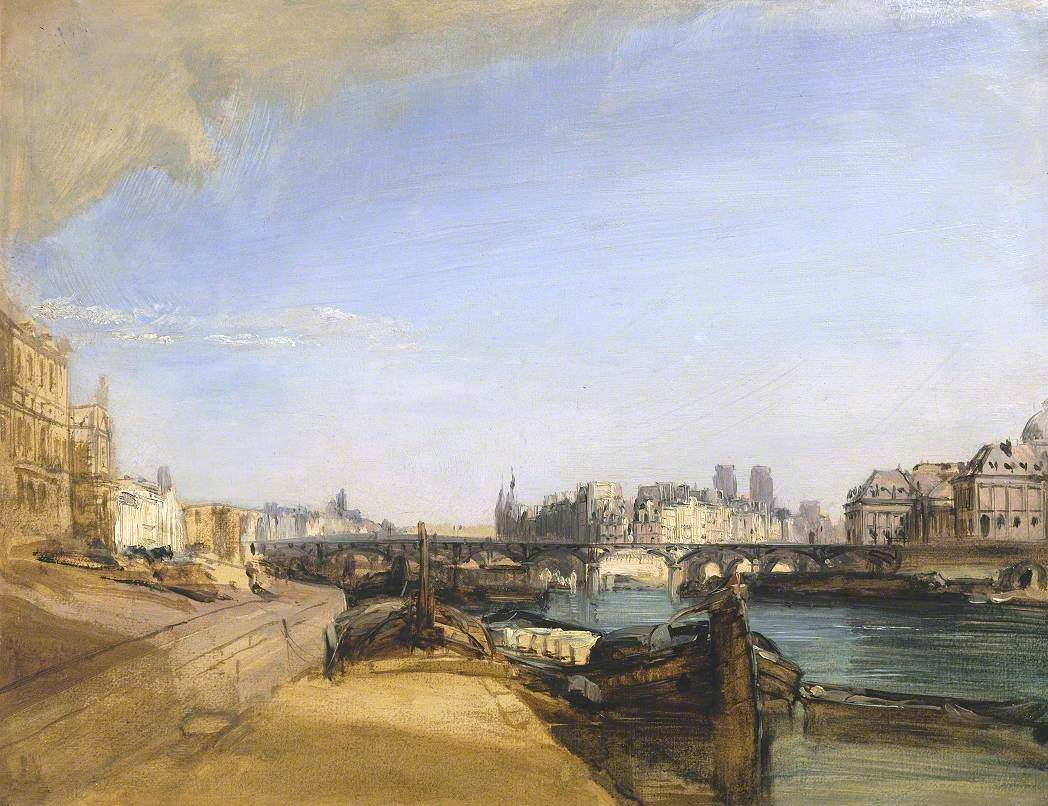
- Artist: Richard Parkes Bonington
- Year: c.1826
- Type: Oil on board, cityscape
- Dimensions: 35.6 cm × 45.1 cm (14.0 in × 17.8 in)
- Location: Tate Britain; London

The Pont des Arts, Paris is an 1826 cityscape painting by the British artist Richard Parkes Bonington. It depicts a scene in Paris during the Restoration era. The Pont des Arts across the River Seine, built during the Napoleonic era, forms the centre of the veduta.

Parkes Bonington was a British artist who lived in France for many years. He produced a number of landscape paintings, primarily of France and Italy before his death from tuberculosis, aged 25. He turned to painting scenes of Paris comparatively late in his career. This work, an oil sketch, was painted a couple of years before his death. It is now in the collection of the Tate Britain in London, having been acquired in 1961.

== Bibliography ==
- Bauer, Gérald. The Eloquence of Colour: The Genius of Bonington's Contemporaries. Clem Arts, 2003.
- Bury, Stephen (ed.) Benezit Dictionary of British Graphic Artists and Illustrators, Volume 1. OUP, 2012.
- Cormack, Malcolm. Bonnington. Phaidon Press, 1989.
- Wright, Christopher, Gordon, Catherine May & Smith, Mary Peskett. British and Irish Paintings in Public Collections: An Index of British and Irish Oil Paintings by Artists Born Before 1870 in Public and Institutional Collections in the United Kingdom and Ireland.
