= On the Adriatic =

Painting by Richard Parkes Bonington

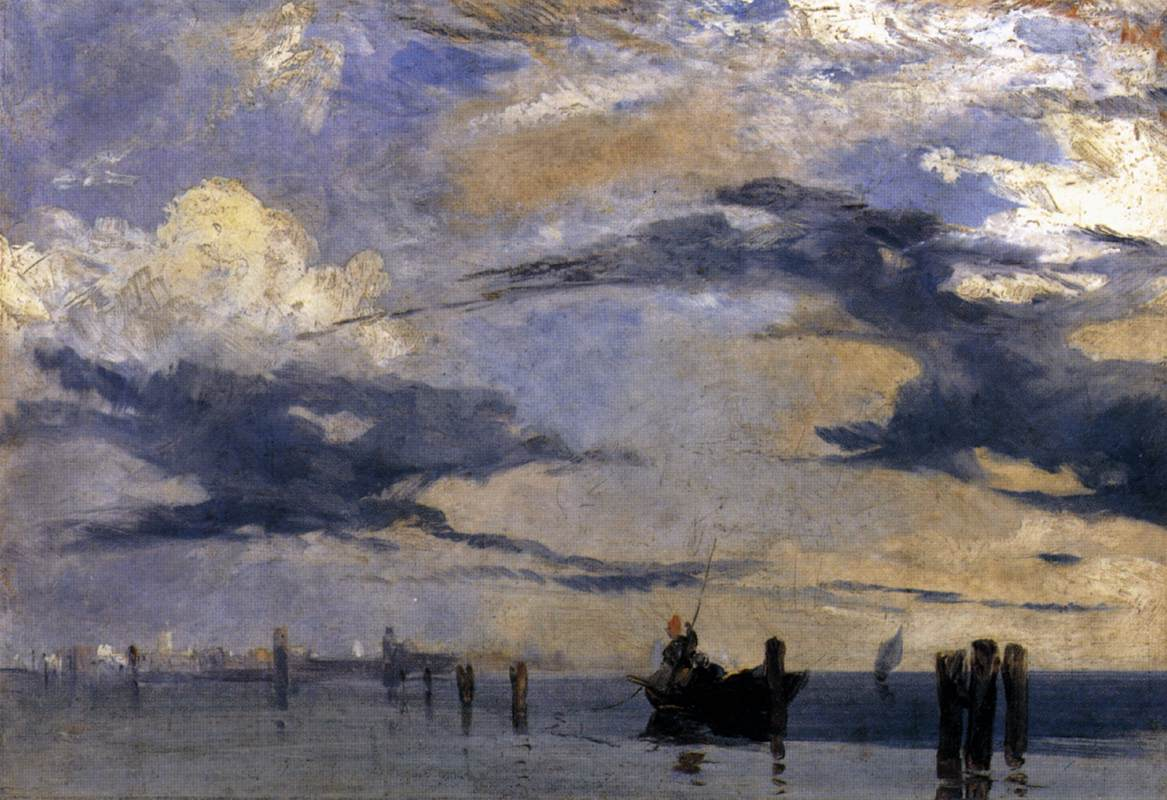
- Artist: Richard Parkes Bonington
- Year: 1826
- Type: Oil on board, landscape painting
- Dimensions: 30 cm × 43 cm (12 in × 17 in)
- Location: Louvre; Paris

On the Adriatic is an 1826 landscape painting by the English artist Richard Parkes Bonington. It depicts a distant view of Venice from the Lagoon on the Adriatic Sea. In the foreground is a gondola. The Nottingham-born Bonington moved to France and enjoyed success for his landscapes before his death at the age of twenty five from consumption.

Today the painting is in the collection of the Louvre, in Paris, having been acquired in 1926.

== Bibliography ==
- Bauer, Gérald. The Eloquence of Colour: The Genius of Bonington's Contemporaries. Clem Arts, 2003.
- Bury, Stephen (ed.) Benezit Dictionary of British Graphic Artists and Illustrators, Volume 1. OUP, 2012.
- Cormack, Malcolm. Bonnington. Phaidon Press, 1989.
- Laclotte, Michel & Cuzin, Jean Pierre. The Louvre: Paintings. Scala, 2009.
