= The Crossing of the Arcole Bridge =

Painting by Horace Vernet

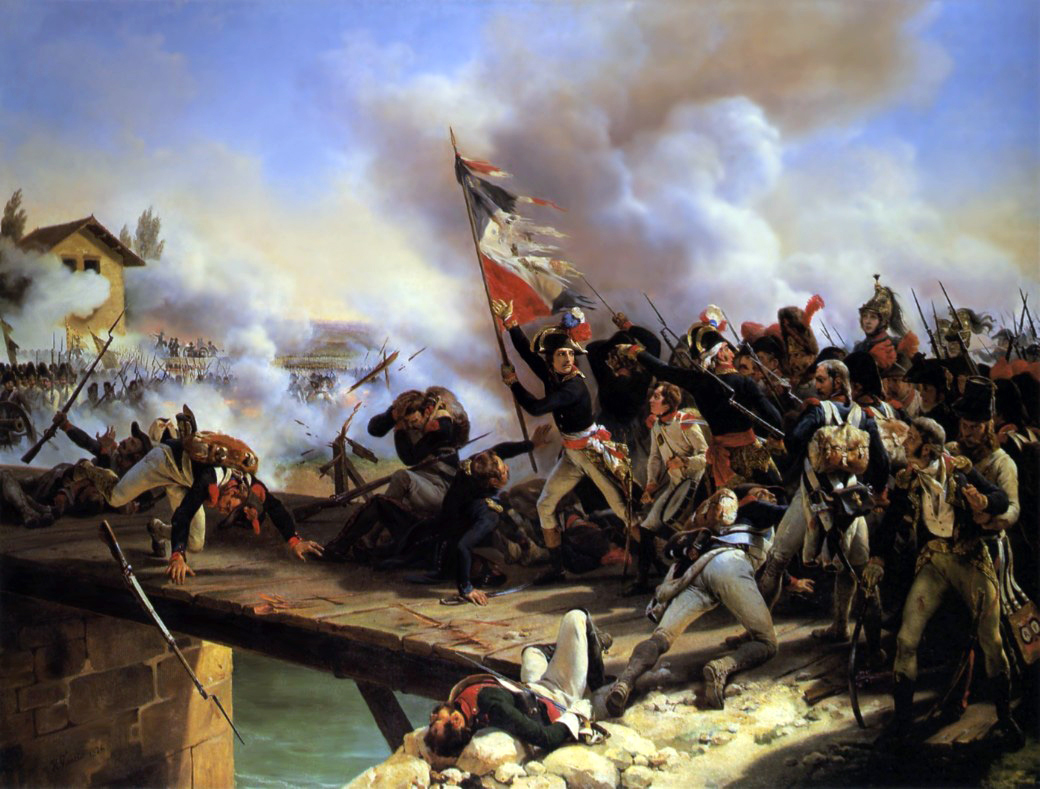
- Artist: Horace Vernet
- Year: 1826
- Type: Oil on canvas, history painting
- Dimensions: 194 cm × 260 cm (76 in × 100 in)
- Location: Private collection

The Crossing of the Arcole Bridge (French: La Bataille du Pont d'Arcole) is an 1826 history painting by the French artist Horace Vernet. It depicts the Battle of Arcole fought in November 1796 during the War of the First Coalition. The French general Napoleon Bonaparte brandishing a tricolour, urges his men forward across the bridge against opposing Austrian forces Vernet enjoyed great success with his battle scenes both during the Restoration era and the later July Monarchy. The painting was displayed at the Salon of 1827 at the Louvre in Paris.

== See also ==
- Bonaparte at the Pont d'Arcole, a 1796 painting by Antoine-Jean Gros

== Bibliography ==
- Harkett, Daniel & Hornstein, Katie (ed.) Horace Vernet and the Thresholds of Nineteenth-Century Visual Culture. Dartmouth College Press, 2017.
- Hornstein, Katie. Picturing War in France, 1792–1856. Yale University Press, 2018.
- Lambert, Andrew. No More Napoleons: How Britain Managed Europe from Waterloo to World War One. Yale University Press, 2025.
- Thoma, Julia. The Final Spectacle: Military Painting under the Second Empire, 1855-1867. Walter de Gruyter, 2019.
