= Richard Parkes Bonington =

English landscape painter (1802–1828)

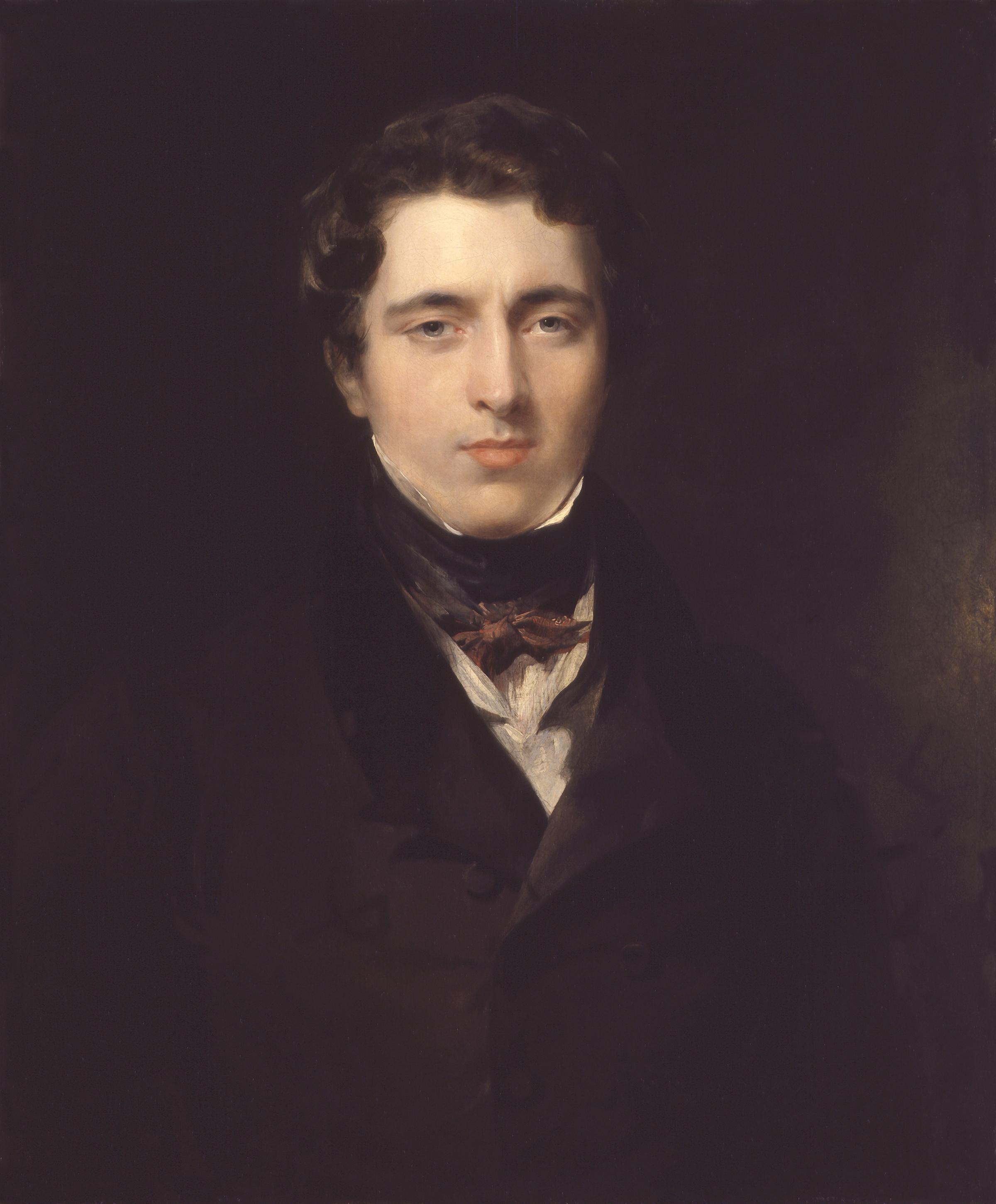
- Portrait of Richard Parkes Bonington by Margaret Sarah Carpenter. c.1827–30
- Born: 25 October 1802; Arnold, Nottinghamshire, England
- Died: 23 September 1828 (aged 25); London, England
- Education: École des Beaux-Arts, Paris
- Movement: Orientalist, Romanticism

Richard Parkes Bonington (25 October 1802 – 23 September 1828) was an English Romantic landscape painter, who in his last years also painted many historical figure paintings. His family moved to France when he was 14 and he can also be considered as a French artist, and an intermediary bringing aspects of English style to France. Becoming, after his early death, one of the most influential British artists of his time, the facility of his style was inspired by the old masters, yet was entirely modern in its application. His landscapes were mostly of coastal scenes, with a low horizon and large sky, showing a brilliant handling of light and atmosphere. He also painted small historical cabinet paintings in a freely-handled version of the troubadour style.

He painted in oils and watercolour, but in oils his style remains "the extension of the techniques and genius of a master painter in watercolour".

== Life and work ==
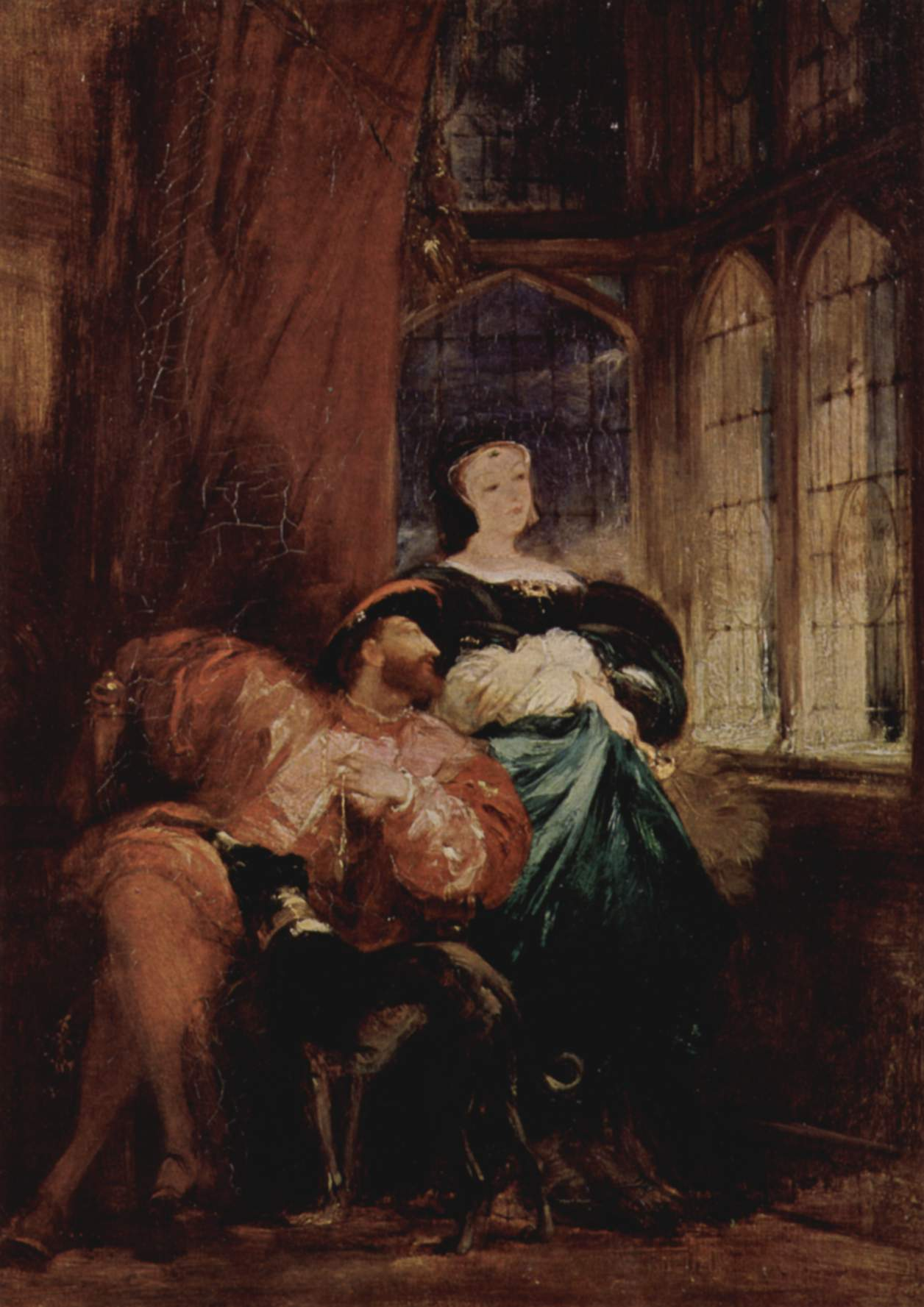
François I and Marguerite de Navarre (45.7 by 34.5 cm), based on the discovery of a scratched inscription on a window at the Château de Chambord

Richard Parkes Bonington was born in the town of Arnold, four miles from Nottingham. His father also known as Richard was successively a gaoler, a drawing master and lace-maker, and his mother a teacher. Bonington learned watercolour painting from his father and exhibited paintings at the Liverpool Academy at the age of eleven.

In 1817, Bonington's family moved to Calais, France, where his father had set up a lace factory. At this time, Bonington started taking lessons from the painter François Louis Thomas Francia, who, having recently returned from England, where he had been deeply influenced by the work of Thomas Girtin, taught him the English watercolour technique. In 1818, the Bonington family moved to Paris to open a lace shop. There he met and became friends with Eugène Delacroix. He worked for a time producing copies of Dutch and Flemish landscapes in the Louvre. In 1820, he started attending the École des Beaux-Arts in Paris, where he studied under Antoine-Jean, Baron Gros.

It was around this time that Bonington started going on sketching tours in the suburbs of Paris and the surrounding countryside. His first paintings were exhibited at the Paris Salon of 1822. He also began to work in oils and lithography, illustrating Baron Taylor's Voyages pittoresques dans l'ancienne France and his own architectural series Restes et Fragmens. In 1824, he won a gold medal at the Paris Salon of 1824 along with John Constable and Anthony Vandyke Copley Fielding, and spent most of the year painting coastal views in Dunkirk.

In 1825 he met Delacroix on a visit with Alexandre-Marie Colin to London, and they sketched together there, and shared a studio for some months in Paris on their return; Delacroix influenced him in turning to historical painting. He also developed a technique mixing watercolour with gouache and gum, achieving an effect close to oil painting. His French Coast with Fisherman was one of the works he exhibited at the British Institution in February 1826 which established his reputation in his native England where he had previously been largely unknown. In 1826 he visited northern Italy, staying in Venice for a month, and London again in 1827–8. In late 1828 his tuberculosis worsened and his parents sent him back to London for treatment. Bonington died of tuberculosis on 23 September 1828 at 29 Tottenham Street in London, aged 25. He was buried in the graveyard of St James's Chapel Pentonville and in 1837 his remains were transferred to Kensal Green Cemetery to be re-interred with his parents.

== Reputation ==
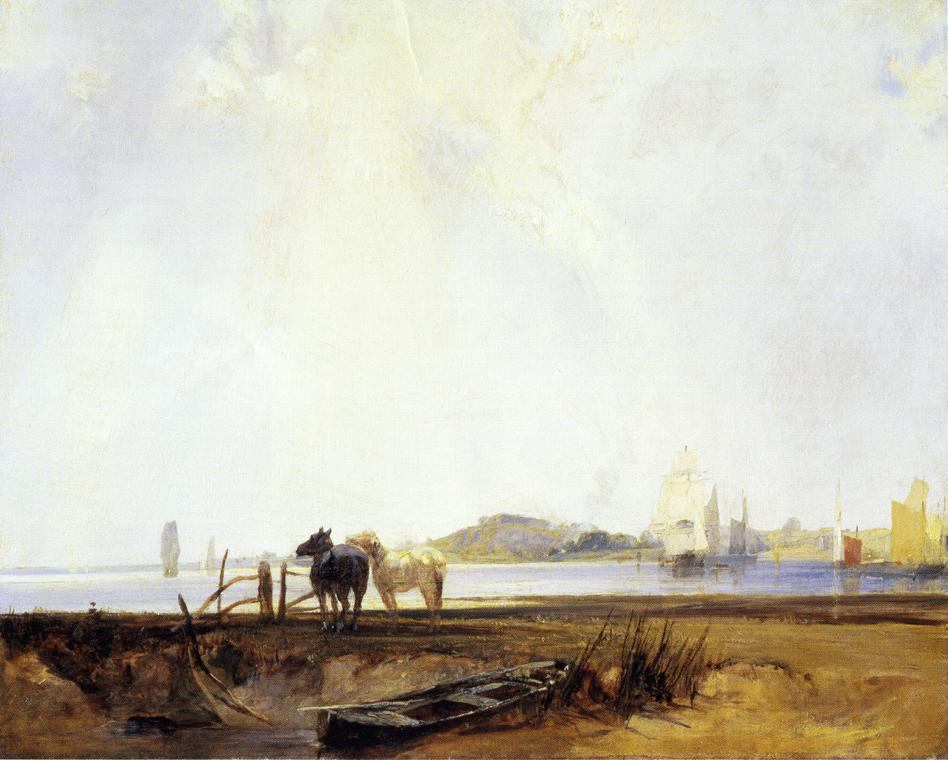
Landscape near Quilleboeuf, c. 1824–1825. Yale Center for British Art

Delacroix paid tribute to Bonington's work in a letter to Théophile Thoré in 1861. It reads, in part:

When I met him for the first time, I too was very young and was making studies in the Louvre: this was around 1816 or 1817... Already in this genre (watercolor), which was an English novelty at that time, he had an astonishing ability... To my mind, one can find in other modern artists qualities of strength and of precision in rendering that are superior to those in Bonington's pictures, but no one in this modern school, and perhaps even before, has possessed that lightness of touch which, especially in watercolours, makes his works a type of diamond which flatters and ravishes the eye, independently of any subject and any imitation.

To Laurence Binyon however, "Bonington's extraordinary technical gift was also his enemy. There is none of the interest of struggle in his painting."

Beyond his watercolors, Bonington is known for his drawings with graphite pencil, particularly his elaborate cityscapes.

Bonington had a number of close followers, such as Roqueplan and Isabey in France, and Thomas Shotter Boys, James Holland, Edward Pritchett, William Callow and John Scarlett Davis in England. In addition, there were many copies and forgeries of his work made in the period immediately after his death.

A statue to him was erected outside the Nottingham School of Art by Watson Fothergill, and a theatre and primary school in his home town of Arnold are named after him. In addition, the house in which he was born (79 High Street, Arnold) is now named 'Bonington House' and is Grade II listed. The Wallace Collection has an especially large group of 35 works, representing both his landscapes and history paintings.

== Gallery ==
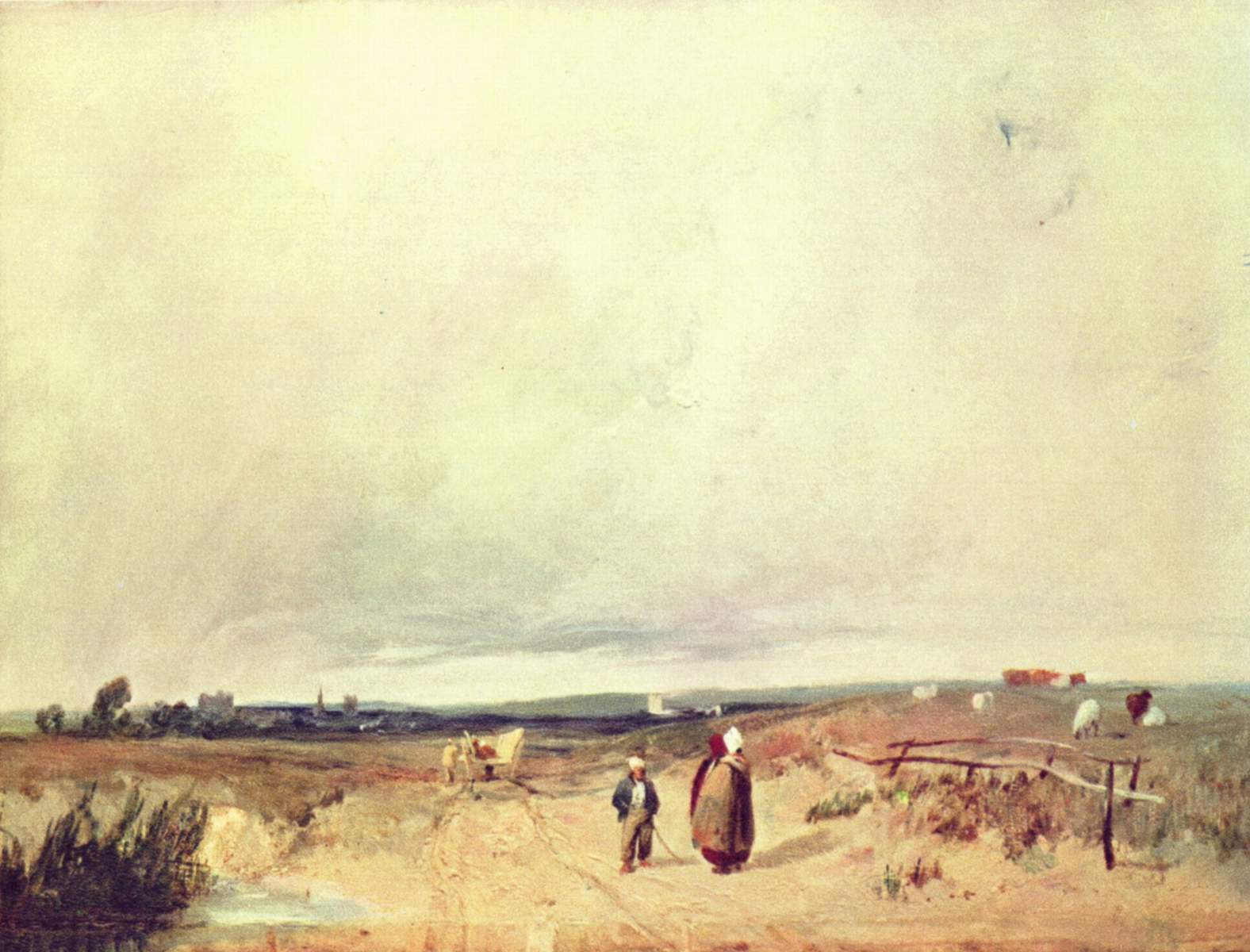
Normandy, c. 1823

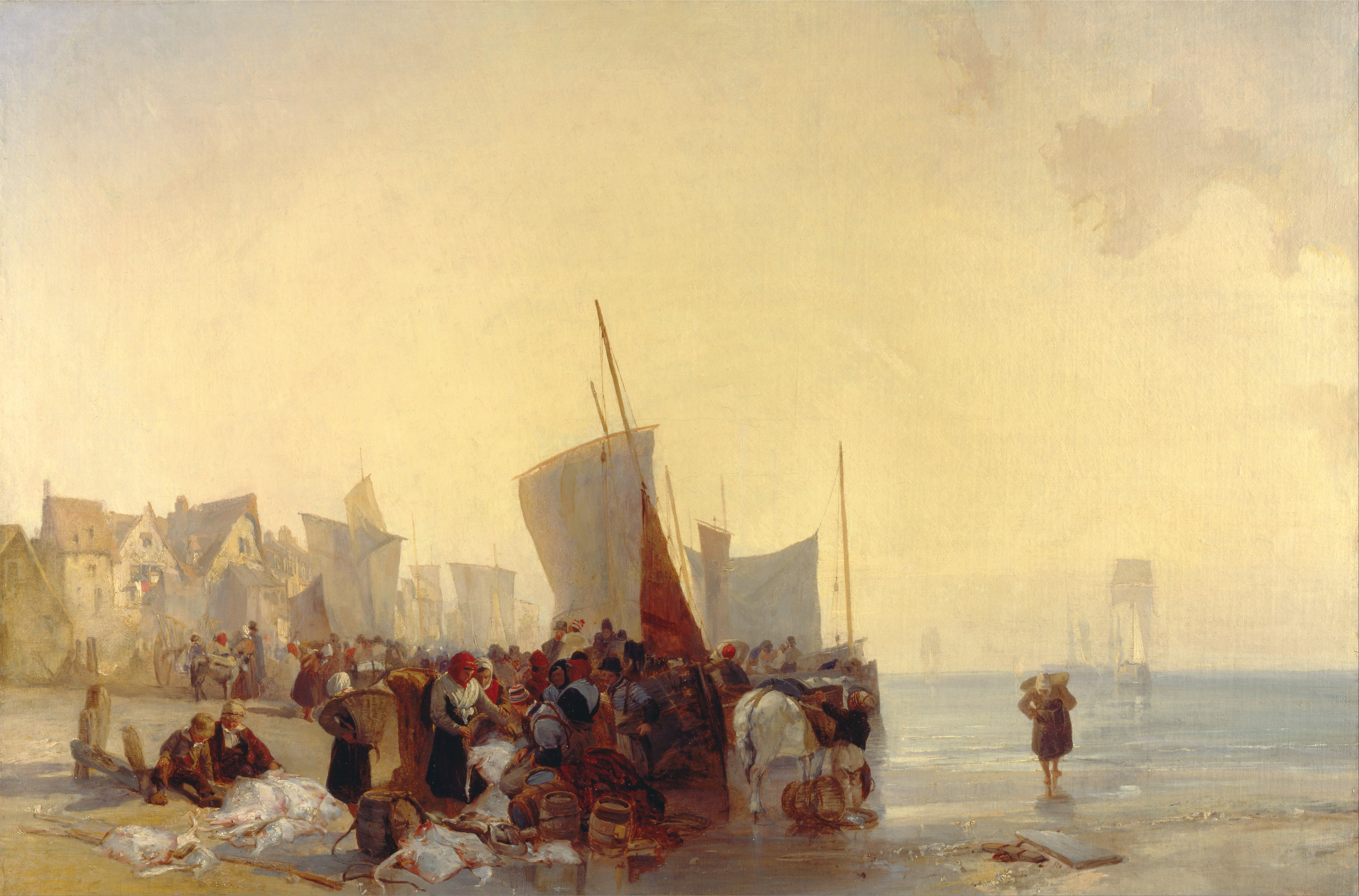
A Fishmarket near Boulogne, 1824

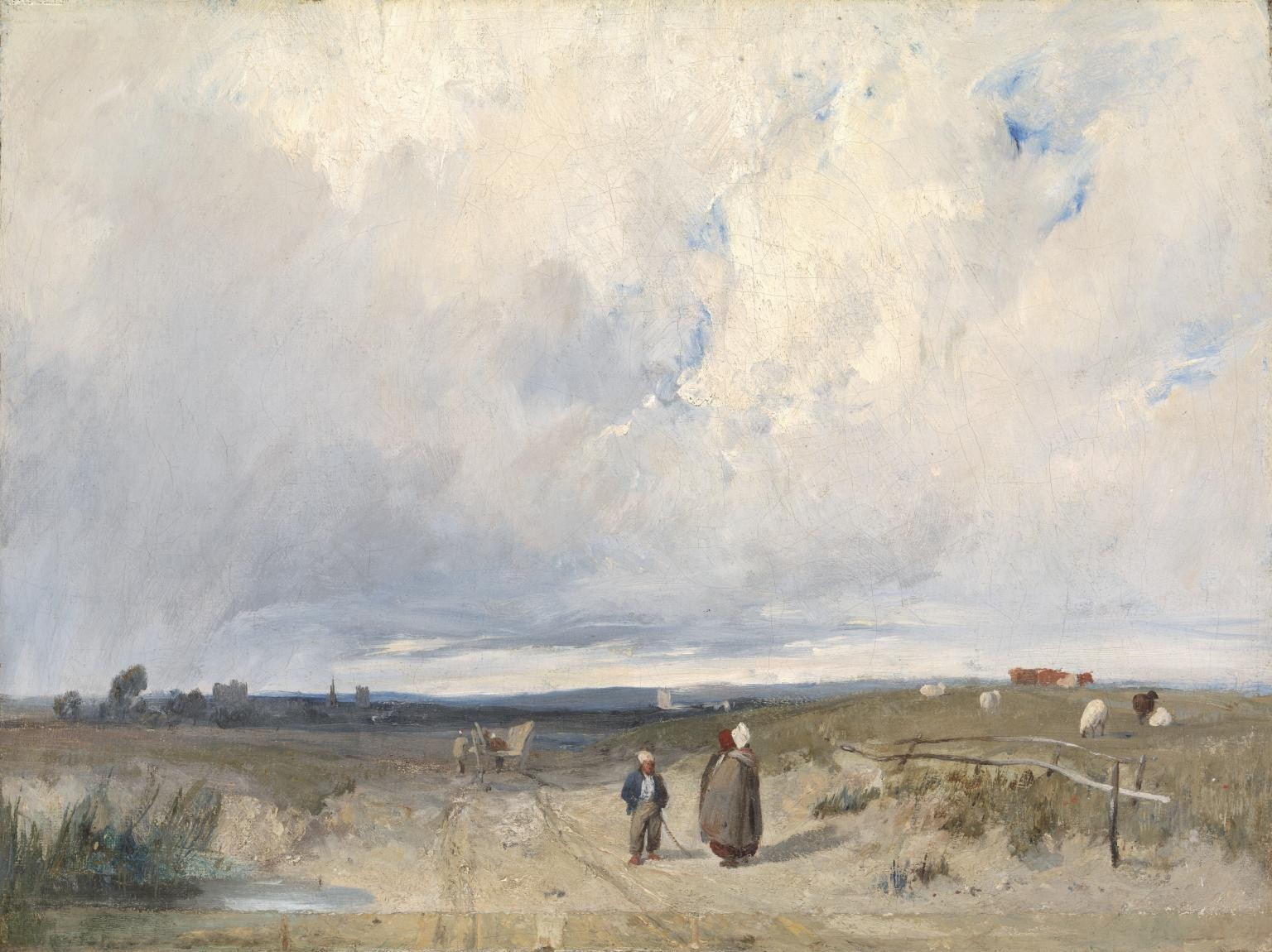
A Distant View of St-Omer, 1824

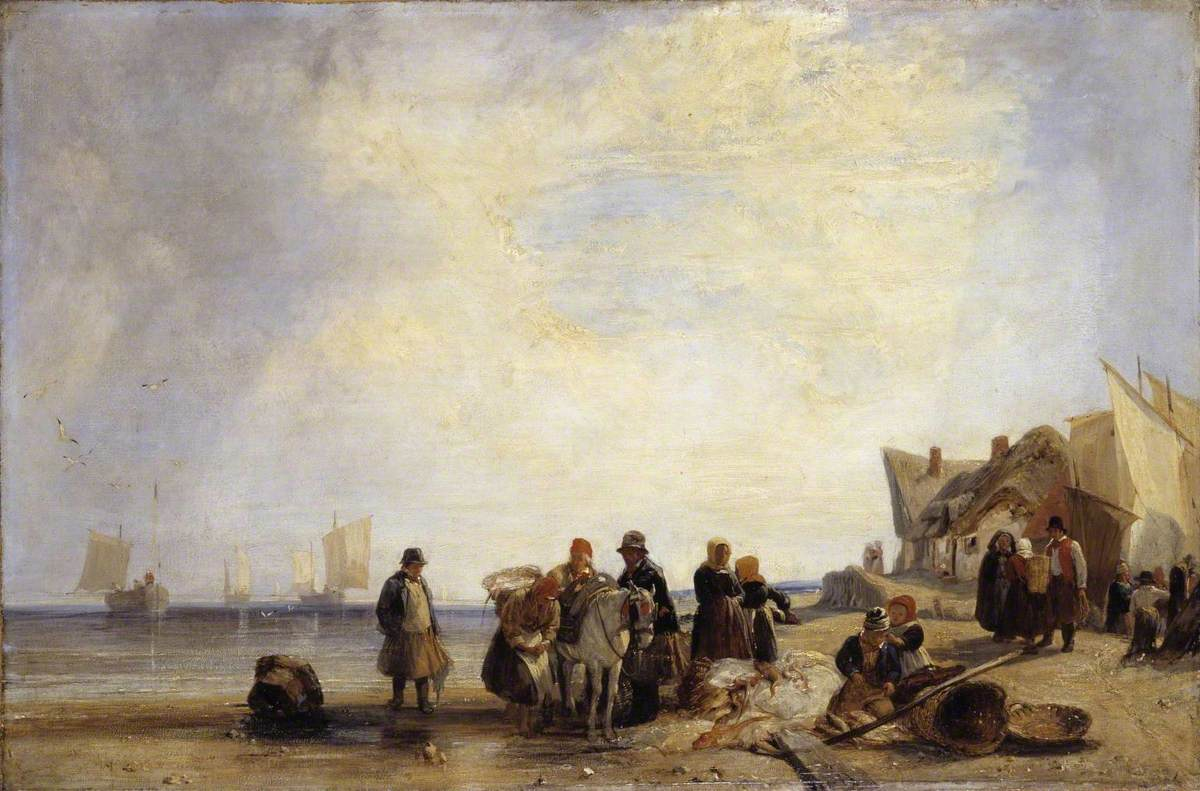
French Coast with Fisherman, 1824

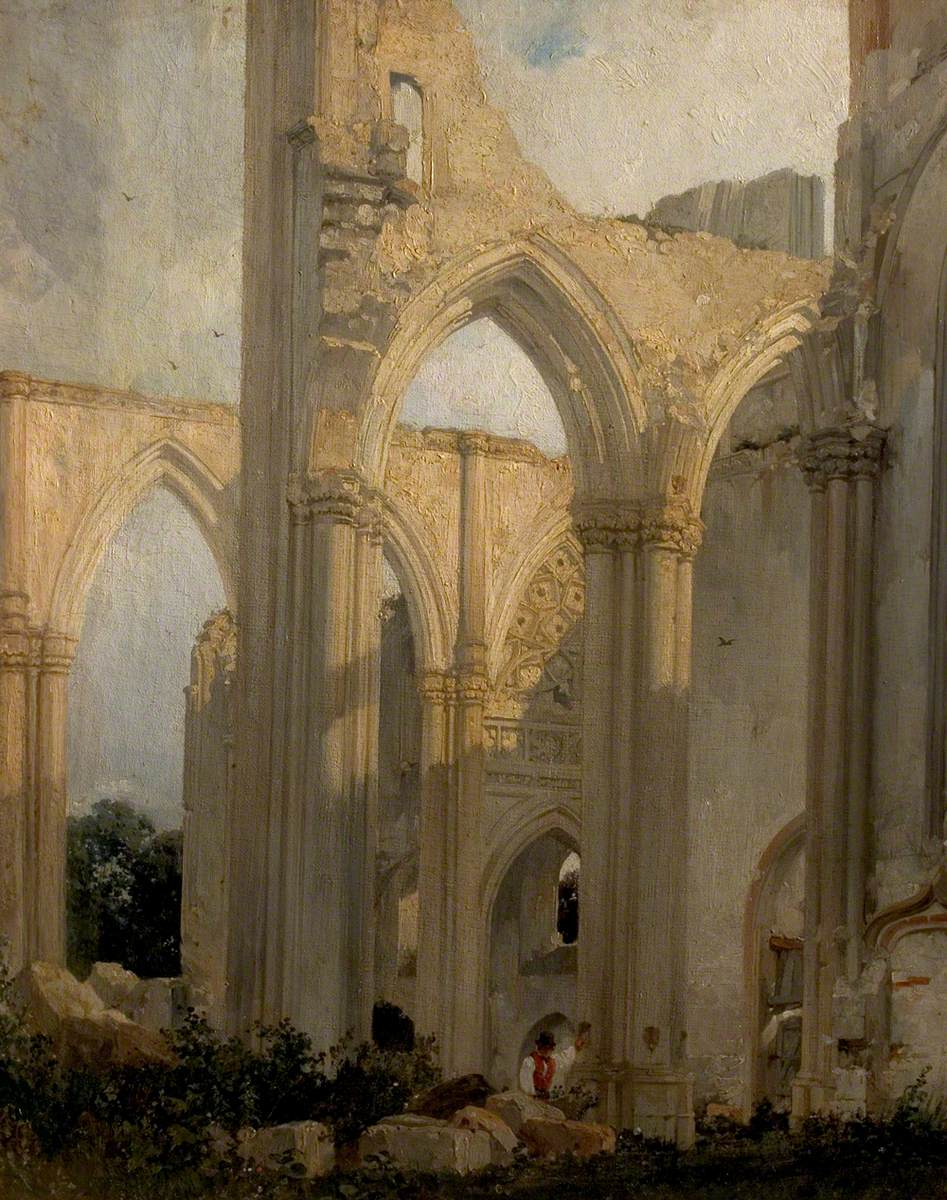
Ruins of the Abbey Saint Bertin, 1824

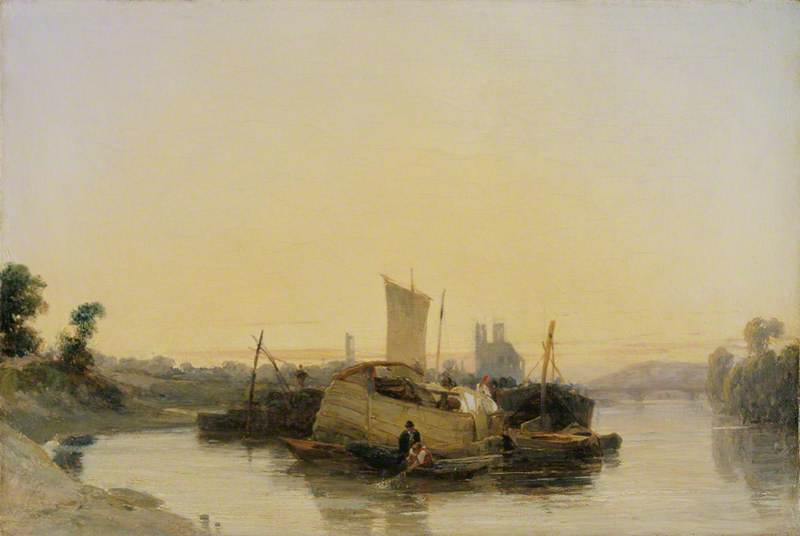
On the Seine near Mantes, 1825

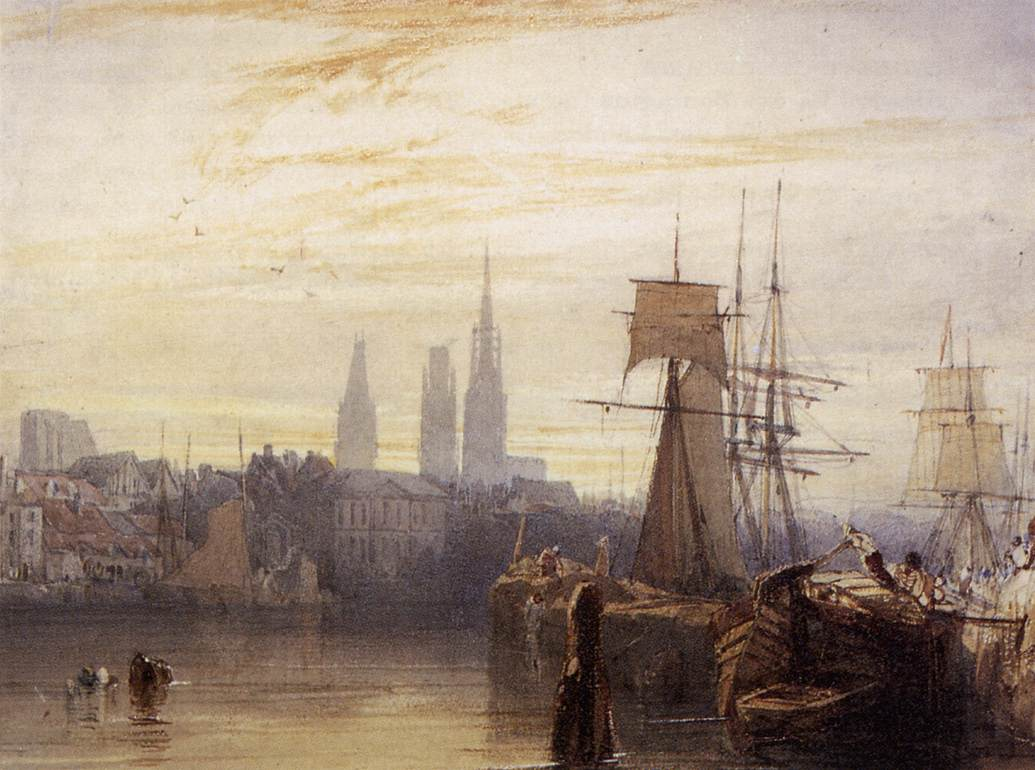
Rouen, 1825

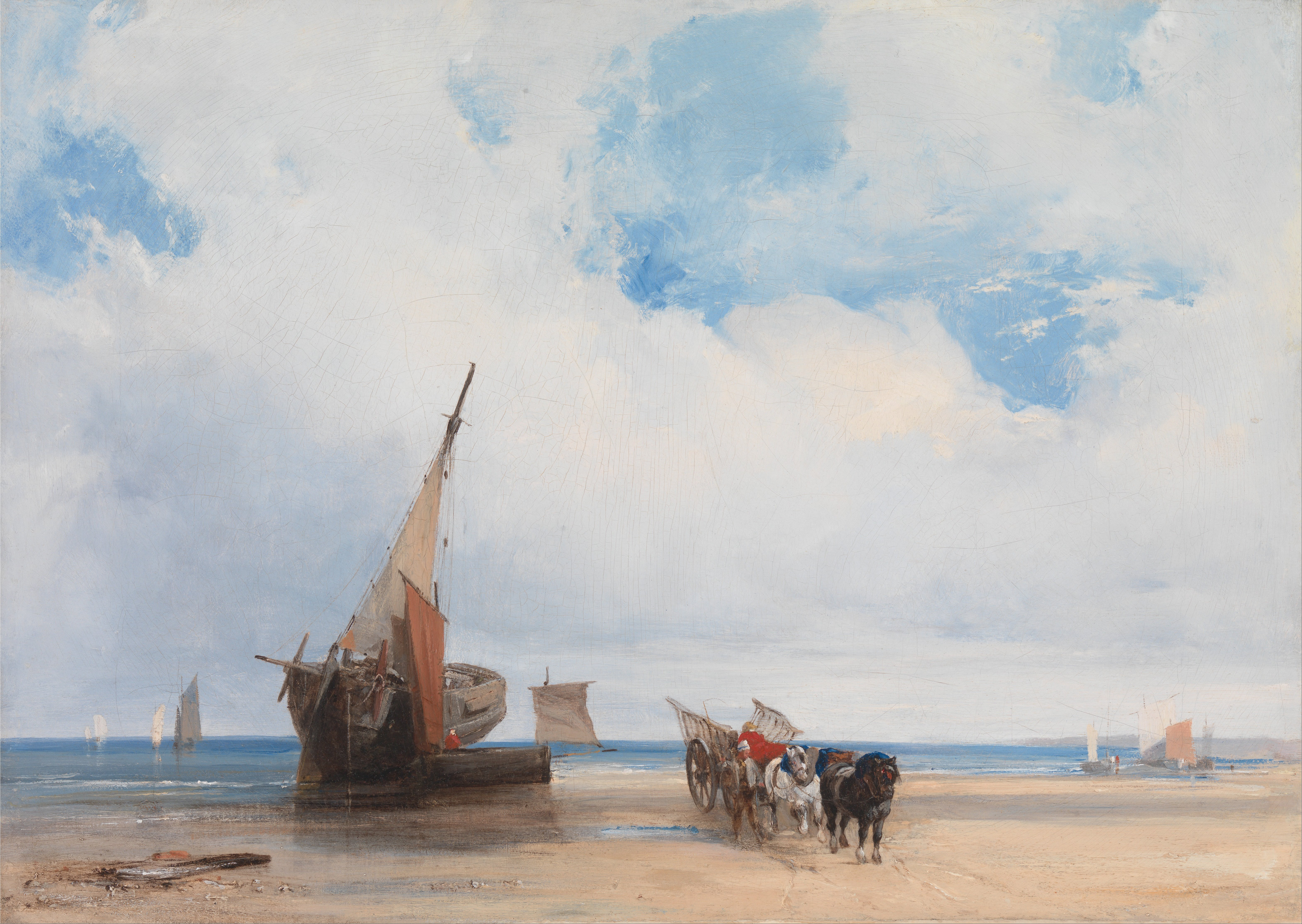
Beached Vessels and a Wagon, near Trouville, 1825

The Château of the Duchess of Berry, 1825

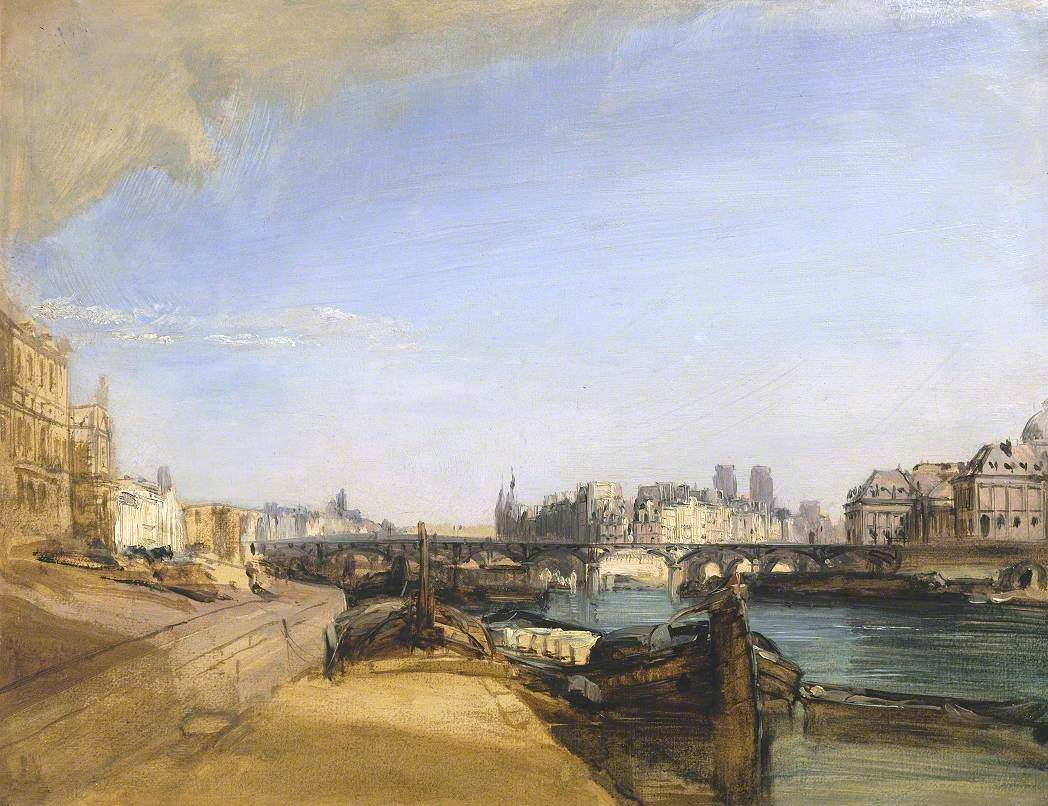
The Pont des Arts, Paris, 1826

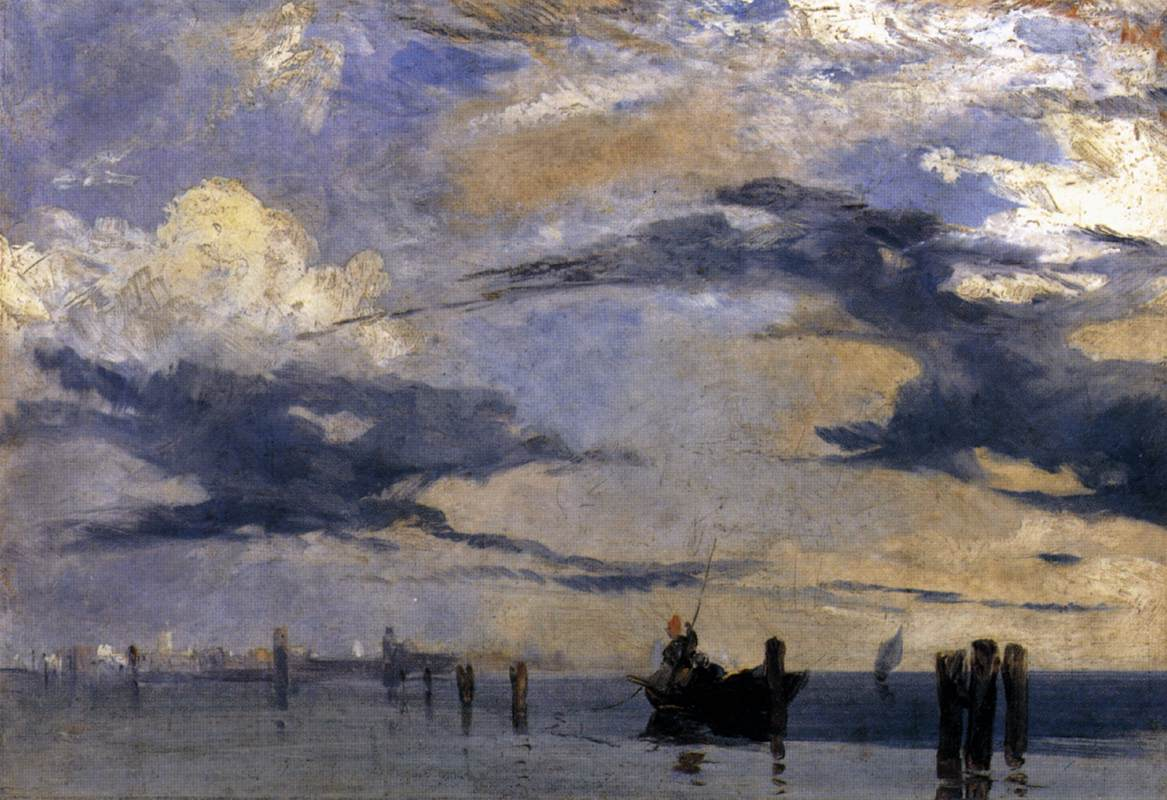
On the Adriatic, 1826

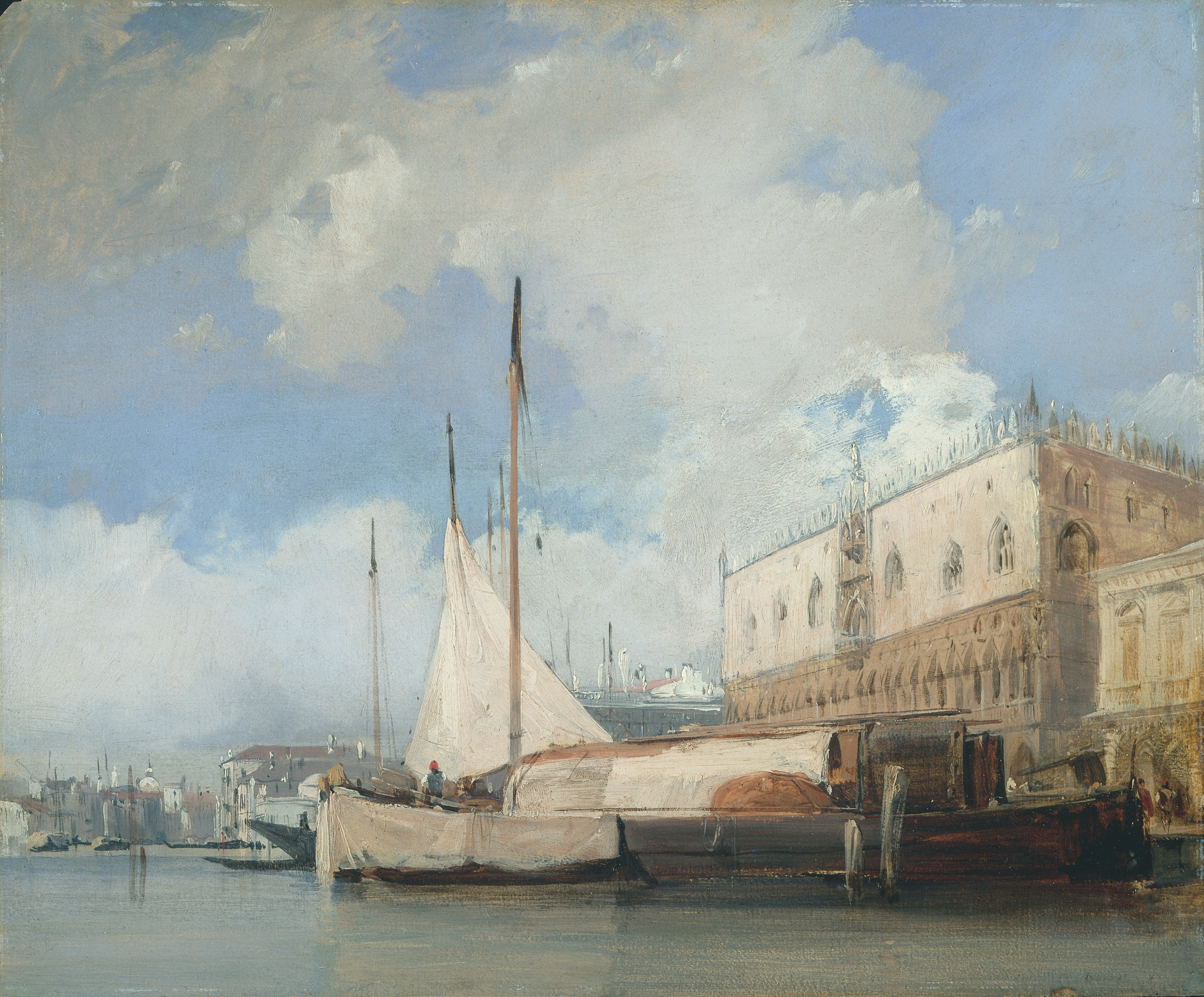
The Doge's Palace, Venice, 1826

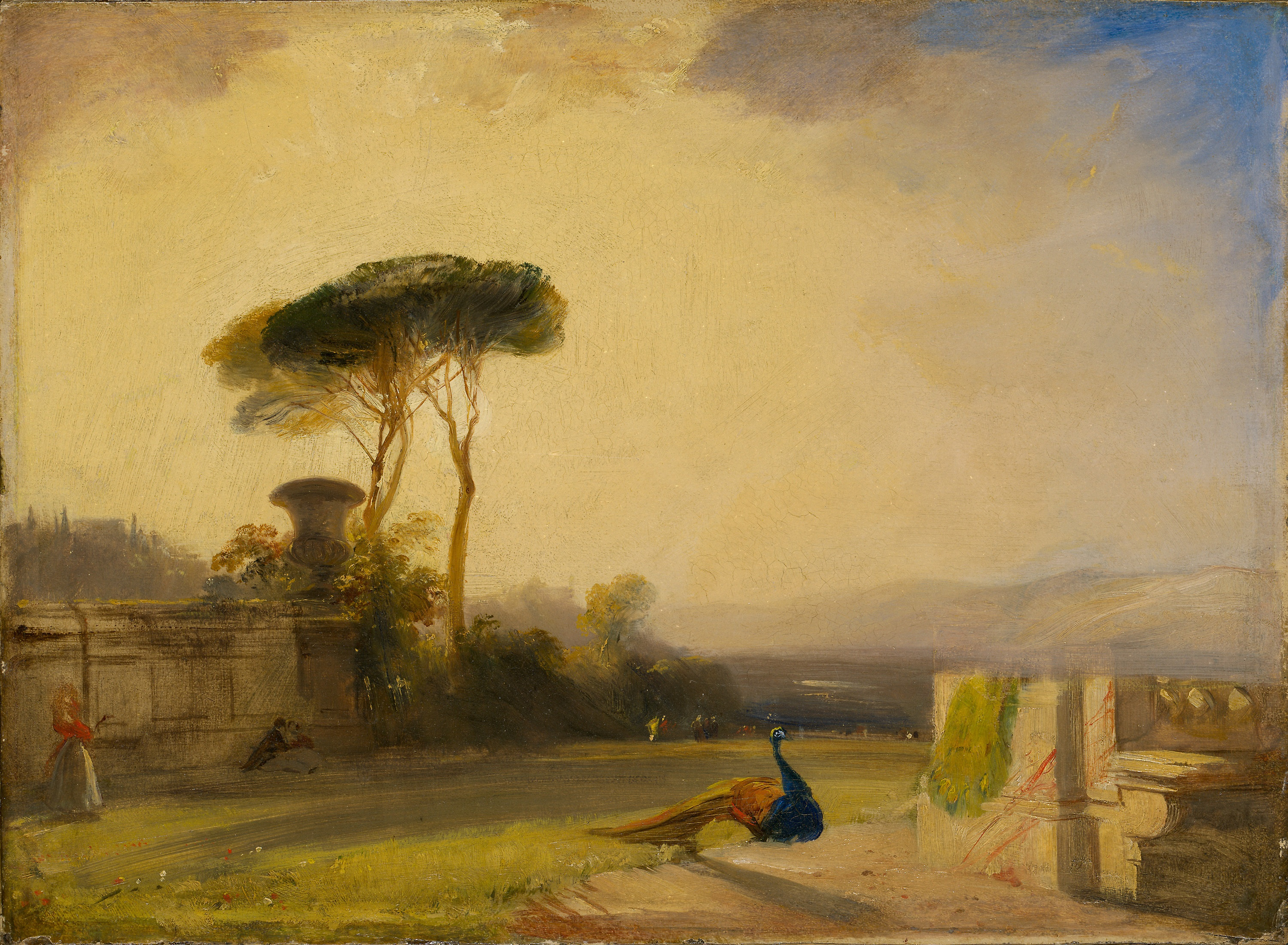
View on the Grounds of a Villa near Florence, 1826

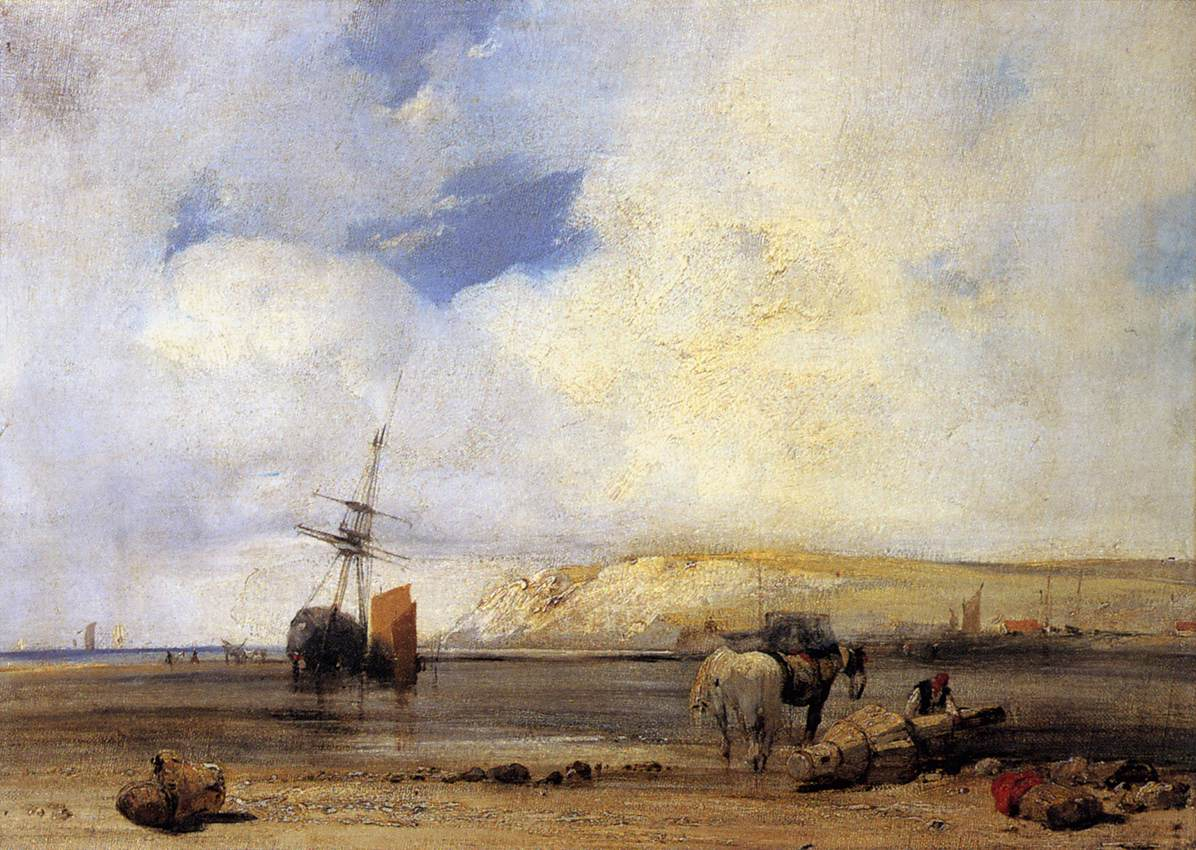
On the Coast of Picardy, 1826

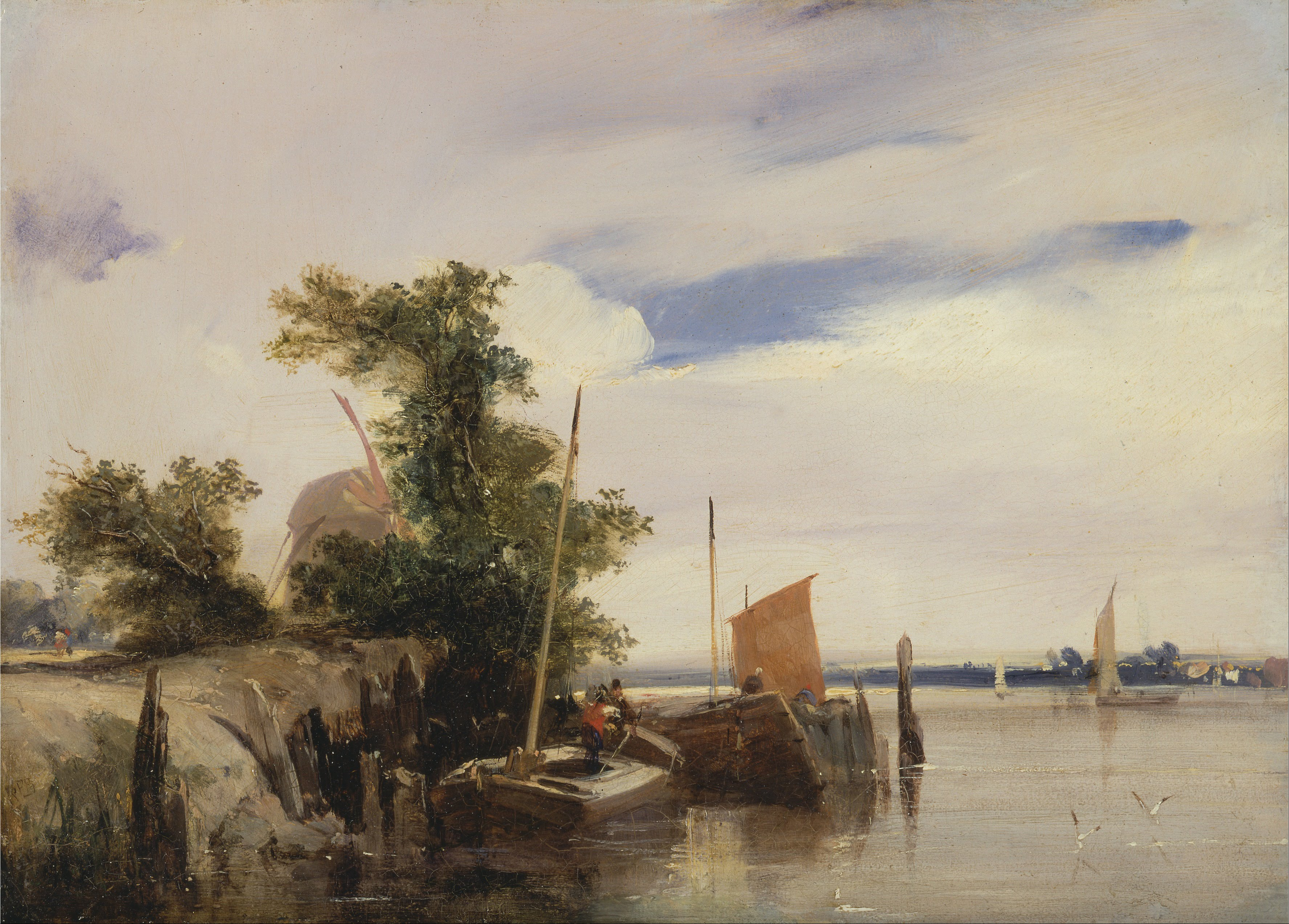
Barges on a River, 1826

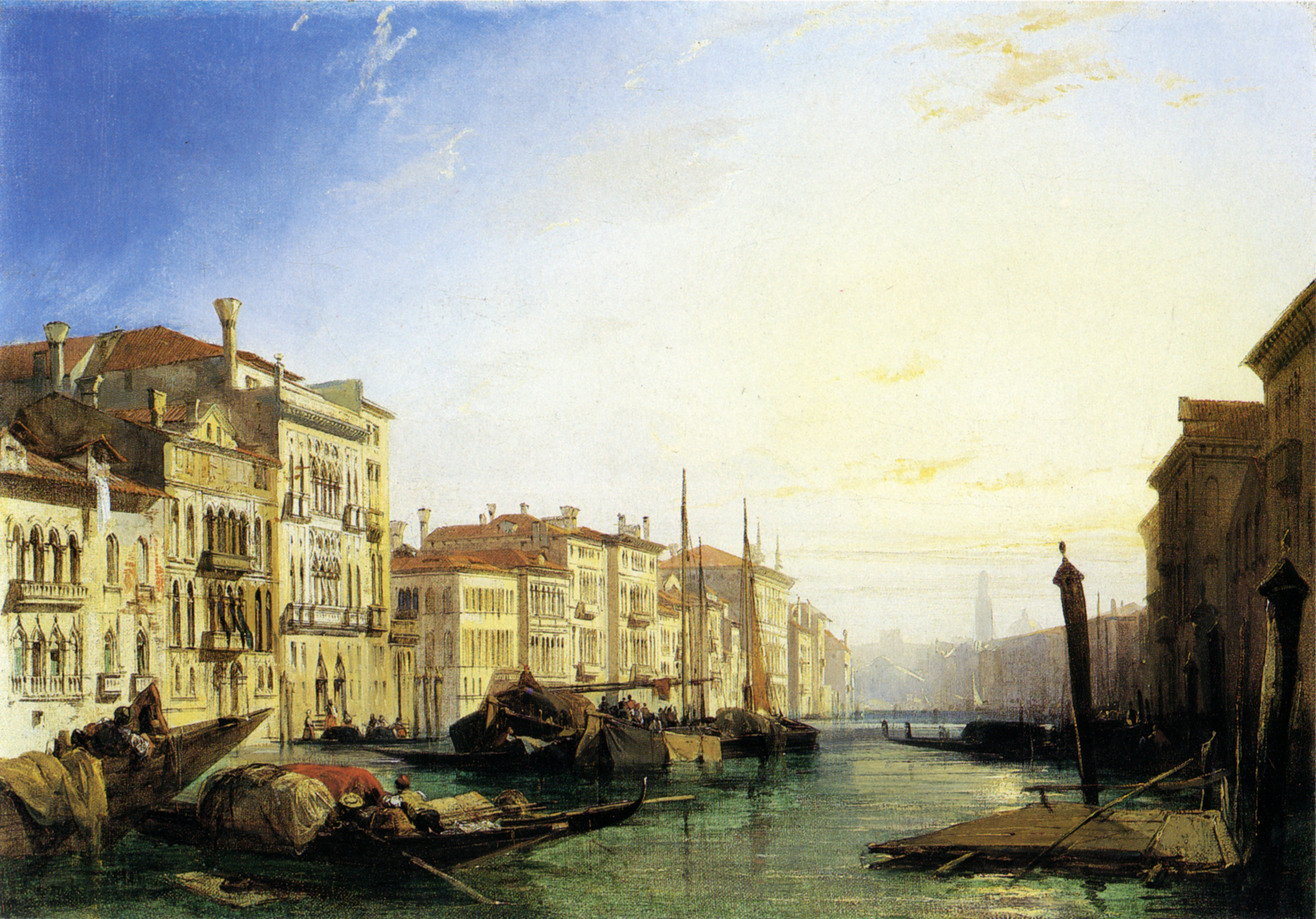
Venice, Grand Canal, 1826

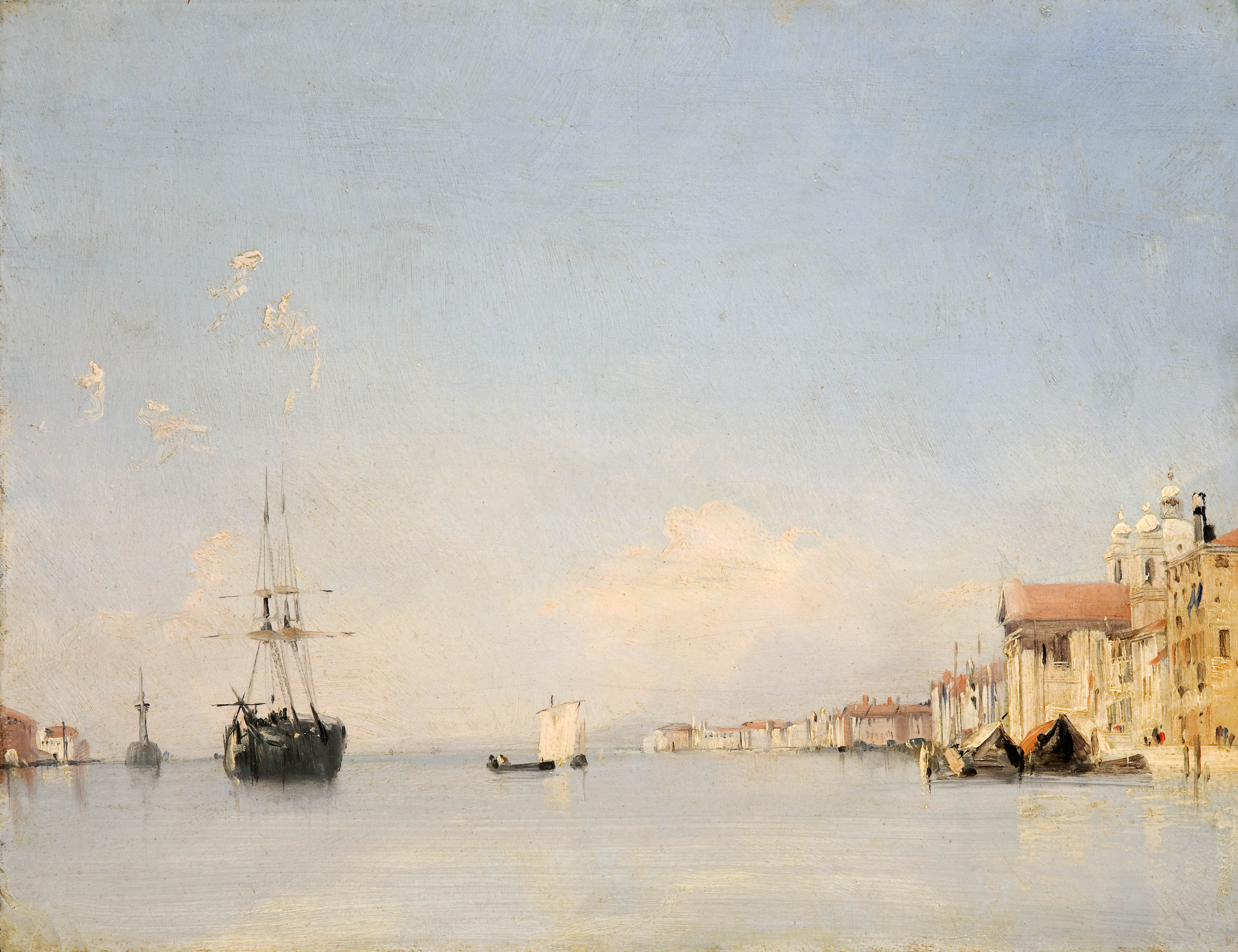
The Giudecca in Venice, 1826

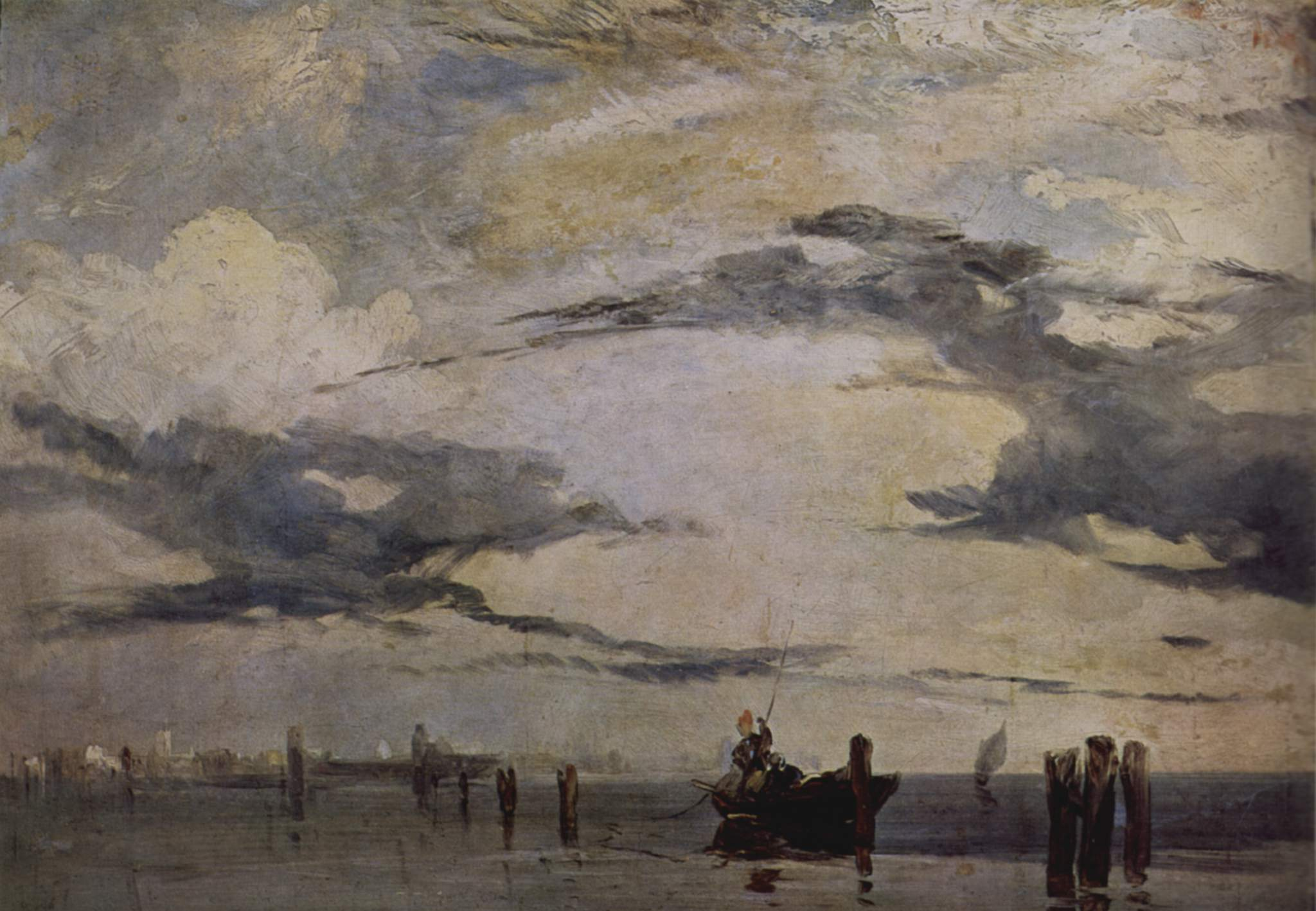
View of the Lagoon Near Venice, 1827. Louvre

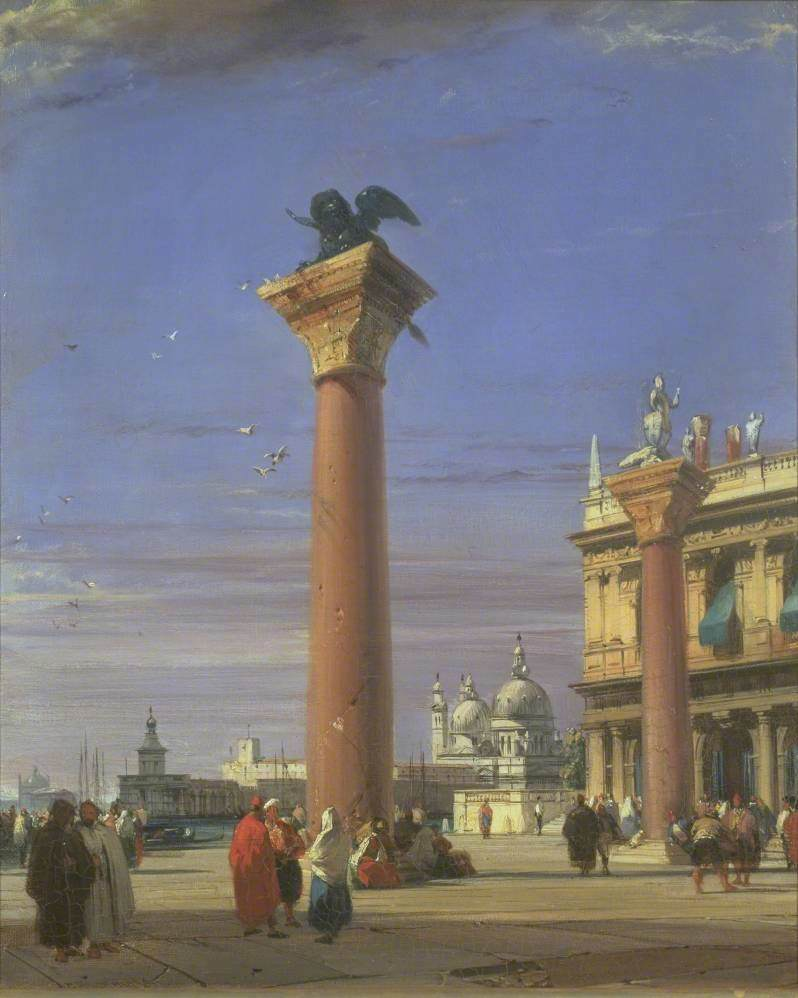
View of the Piazzetta near the Square of St Mark, Venice, 1827

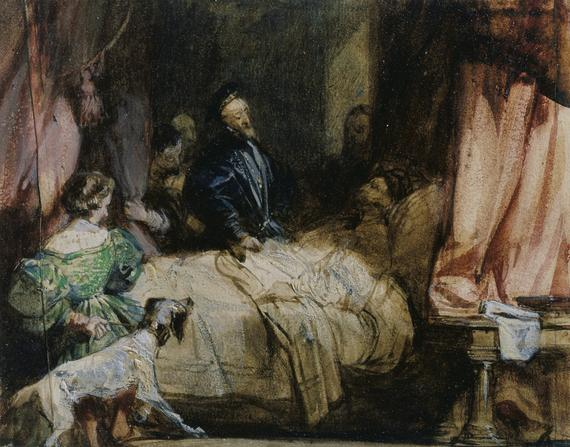
Charles V visits Francis I after the Battle of Pavia, c. 1827

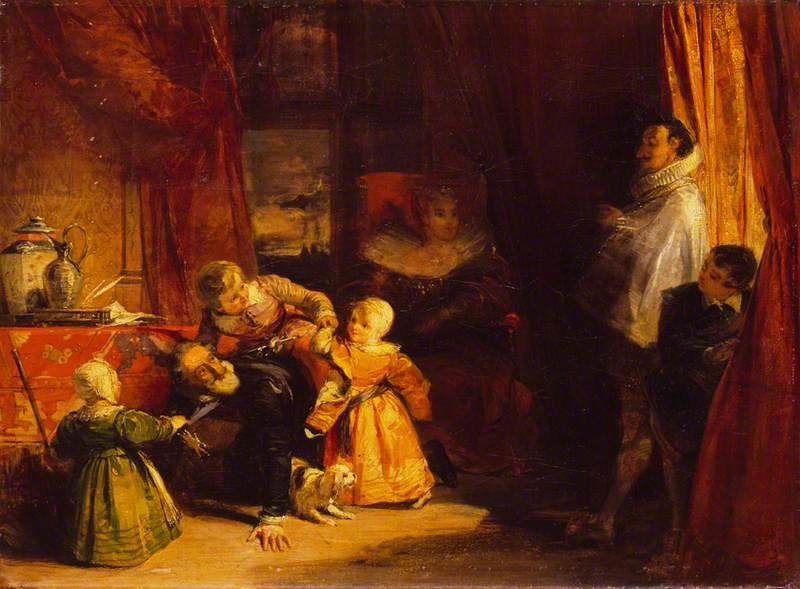
Henry IV and the Spanish Ambassador, 1827

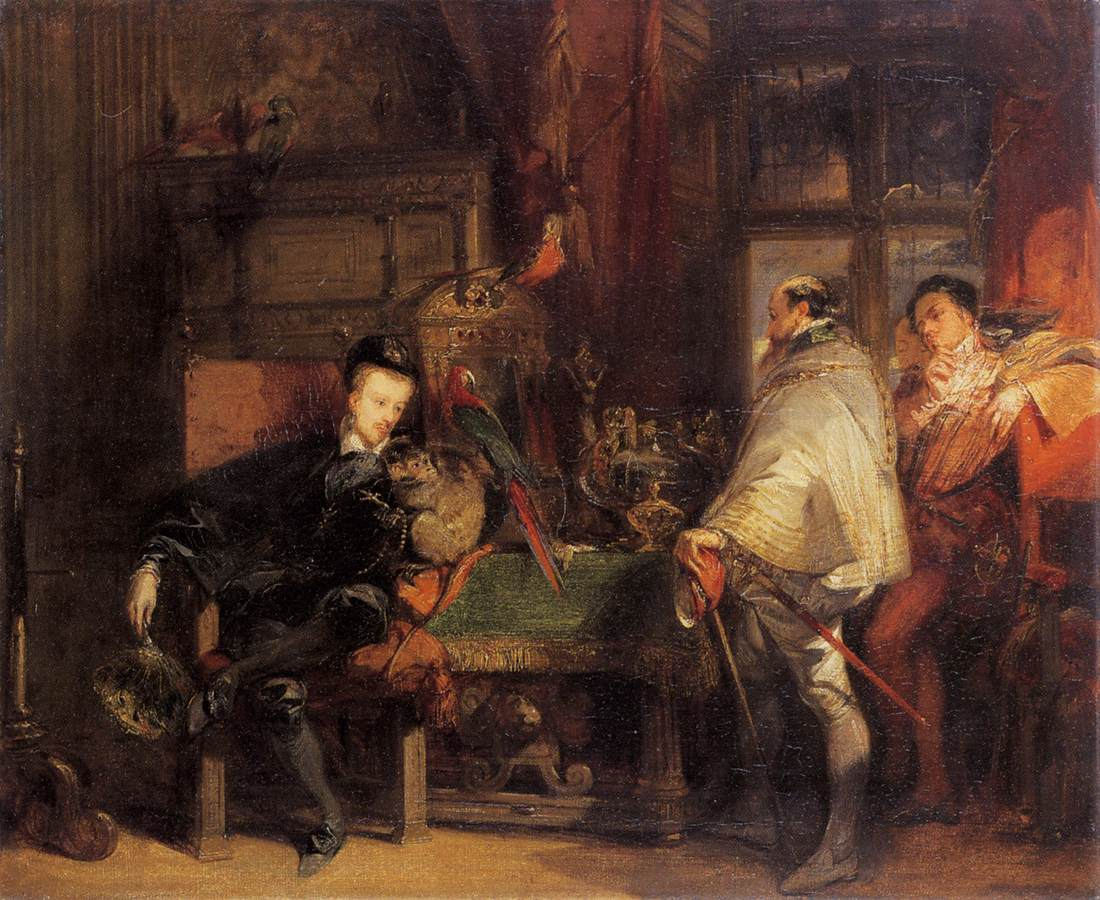
Henri III and the English Ambassador, 1827

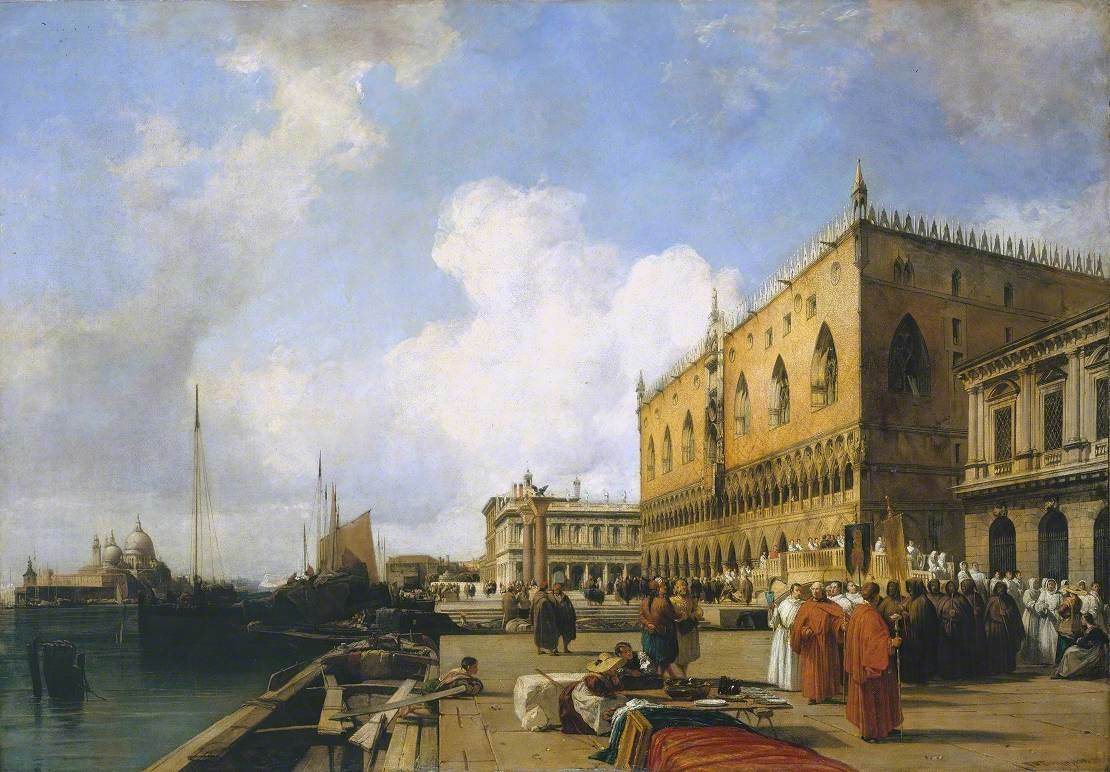
Venice, Ducal Palace with a Religious Procession, 1828

Quentin Durward at Liège, 1828

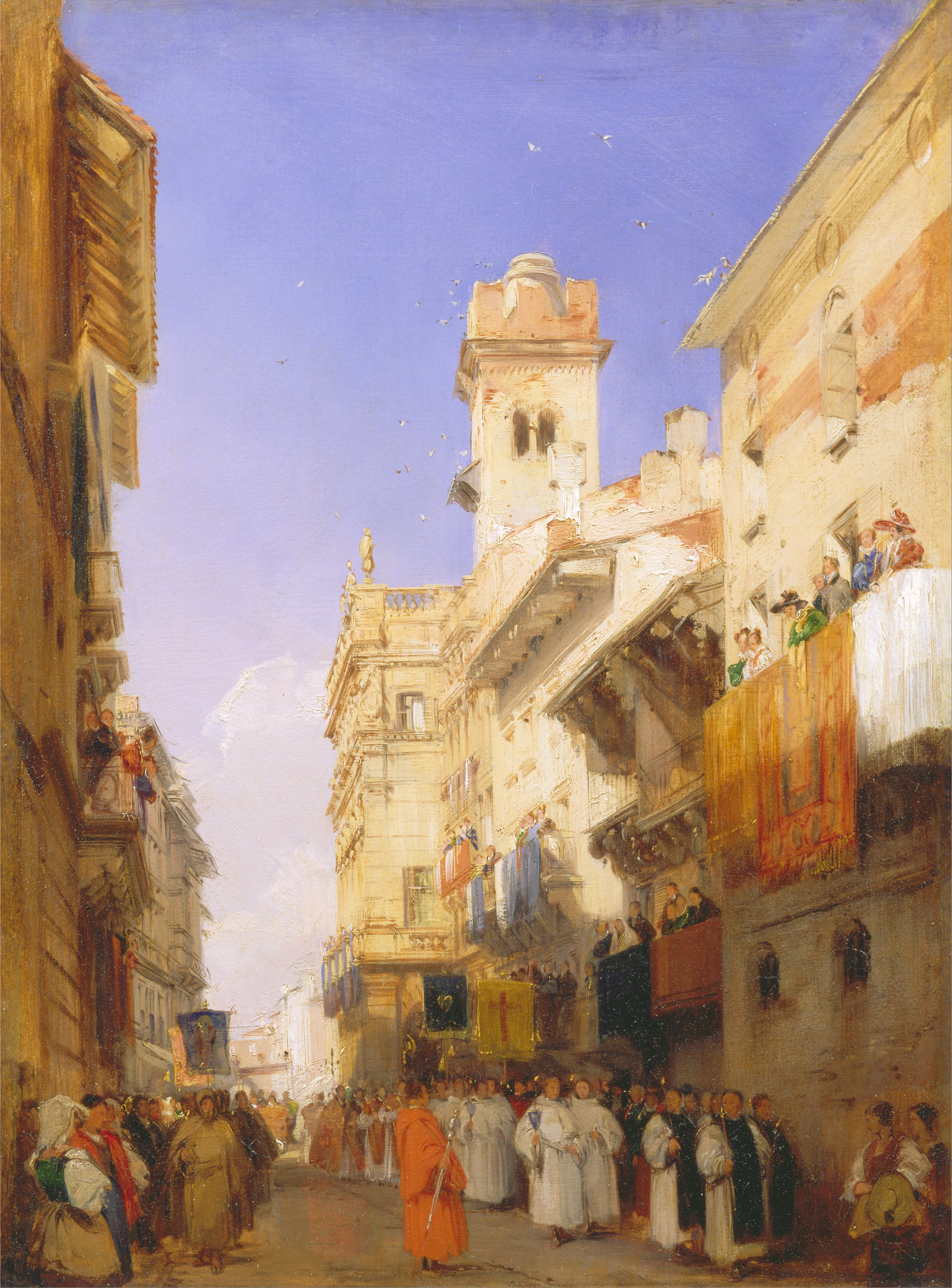
Corso Sant'Anastasia, Verona, 1828

== References and sources ==
=== Sources ===
- Binyon, Laurence (1933). English Watercolours. London: A&C Black.
- Cambridge, M (2002). Richard Parkes Bonington: Young and Romantic. Nottingham: Nottingham Castle ISBN 0-905634-58-6 (Catalogue of exhibition at Nottingham Castle Museum in 2002; contains an account of the life and works that includes many references.)
- Ingamells, John, The Wallace Collection, Catalogue of Pictures, Vol I, British, German, Italian, Spanish, Wallace Collection, 1985, ISBN 0-900785-16-0
- Mallalieu, Huon, The Dictionary of British watercolour artists up to 1920, Volume I A-L, 3rd edition, 2002, Woodbridge, Suffolk: Antique Collectors' Club, ISBN 185149426X, 2nd edition on the Internet Archive
- Noon, Patrick & Bann, Stephen. Constable to Delacroix: British Art and the French Romantics. Tate, 2003.
- Novotny, Fritz (1971). Painting and Sculpture in Europe, 1780-1880. Pelican History of Art (2nd ed.). Yale University Press. ISBN 0-14-056120-X.

== See also ==
- List of Orientalist artists
- Orientalism
