= Cologne, the Arrival of a Packet Boat in the Evening =

Painting by J. M. W. Turner

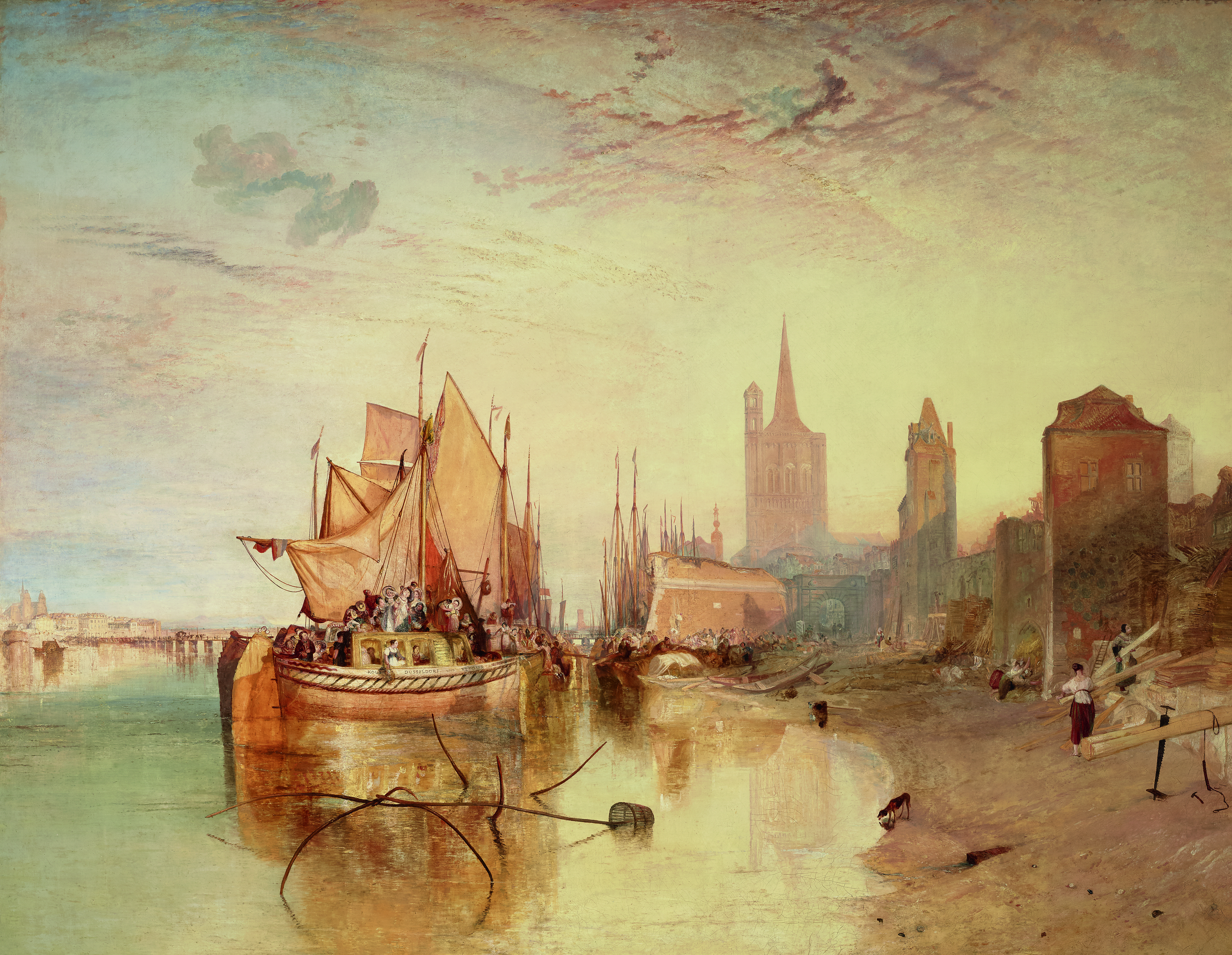
- Artist: J. M. W. Turner
- Year: 1826
- Medium: Oil on canvas
- Dimensions: 168.6 cm × 224.2 cm (66.4 in × 88.3 in)
- Location: Frick Collection, New York City
- Accession: 1914.1.119
- Website: collections.frick.org/objects/136/cologne-the-arrival-of-a-packetboat-evening

Cologne, the Arrival of a Packet Boat in the Evening is an 1826 landscape painting by the British artist Joseph Mallord William Turner. It shows a scene as the Rhine River passes through the city of Cologne as a packet boat arrives. Visible on the skyline to the right is Great St. Martin Church, Cologne.

== Critical reception ==
In the Royal Academy Exhibition of 1826, Turner exhibited three paintings that featured a predominance of yellow that some fellow painters and art critics felt as excessive and inappropriate: Cologne, the Arrival of a Packet Boat in the Evening, Forum Romanum and Mortlake Terrace: Early Summer Morning.

Even though there were enthusiastic reviews for the paintings, The British Press published the following infamous critique, comparing Turner 's paintings with John Constable's more traditional rural landscape paintings, Parham Mill and The Cornfield:

It is impossible there can be a greater contrast of colour than is found between Mr Constable and Mr Turner. In all, we find the same intolerable yellow hue pervading every thing; whether boats or buildings, water or watermen, houses or horses, all is yellow, yellow, nothing but yellow, violently contrasted with blue … we cannot view his works without pain.

== Exhibitions ==
It was presented by Turner at Royal Academy Exhibition of 1826.

The same year his younger rival Clarkson Stanfield produced his own similar view The Banks of the Rhine in Cologne.

Today the painting is in the Frick Collection in New York City.

== See also ==
- List of paintings by J. M. W. Turner

== Bibliography ==
- Bailey, Anthony. J.M.W. Turner: Standing in the Sun. Tate Enterprises Ltd, 2013.
- Hamilton, James. Turner's Britain. Merrell, 2003.
- Reynolds, Graham. Turner. Thames & Hudson, 2022.
- Riding, Christine. Turner on Tour. National Gallery, 2022.
- Shanes, Eric. Turner: The Life and Masterworks. Parkstone, 2004.
- Trotter, David. Cooking with Mud: The Idea of Mess in Nineteenth-century Art and Fiction. Oxford University Press, 2000.
