= The Banks of the Rhine in Cologne =

Painting by Clarkson Stanfield

- Artist: Clarkson Stanfield
- Year: 1826
- Medium: Oil on canvas, landscape painting
- Dimensions: 113 cm × 168 cm (44 in × 66 in)
- Location: Rheinisches Landesmuseum; Bonn

The Banks of the Rhine in Cologne is an 1826 landscape painting by the British artist Clarkson Stanfield. It features a view of the city of Cologne on the River Rhine, then part of the Prussia. To the right is the unfinished Cologne Cathedral while further in the distance is the Great St. Martin Church and the Drachenfels, the latter a Romantic embellishment as it wouldn't have been visible from his viewpoint. Stanfield was a former sailor then best known for his set designs at the Theatre Royal, Drury Lane. He based his depiction of Cologne on a trip he had made there in 1823. He was likely strongly influenced by J.M.W. Turner and the success he has recently enjoyed of paintings of his European travels.

The painting was displayed at the exhibition of the Society of British Artists held in Suffolk Street off Pall Mall. The same year Turner displayed his own view of the city Cologne, the Arrival of a Packet Boat in the Evening at the rival Royal Academy Exhibition of 1826. Stanfield would himself later become a prominent member of the Royal Academy and a friend of Turner. Today the painting is part of the collection of the Rheinisches Landesmuseum in Bonn. An 1828 engraving was produced by James Harfield Kernot based on the picture.

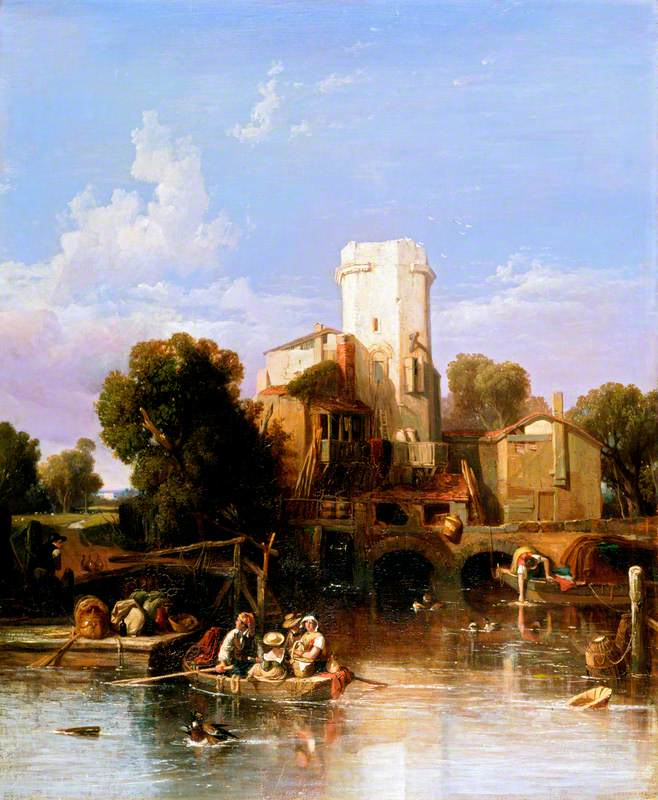
On the Rhine, near Cologne, 1829

In 1829 Stanfield produced another, unrelated painting of the region On the Rhine, near Cologne which was part of the 1857 Sheepshanks Gift to the Victoria and Albert Museum.

== Bibliography ==
- Riding, Christine. Turner on Tour. National Gallery, 2022.
- Van der Merwe, Pieter & Took, Roger. The Spectacular career of Clarkson Stanfield. Tyne and Wear County Council Museums, 1979.
