= Forum Romanum (painting) =

Painting by J. M. W. Turner

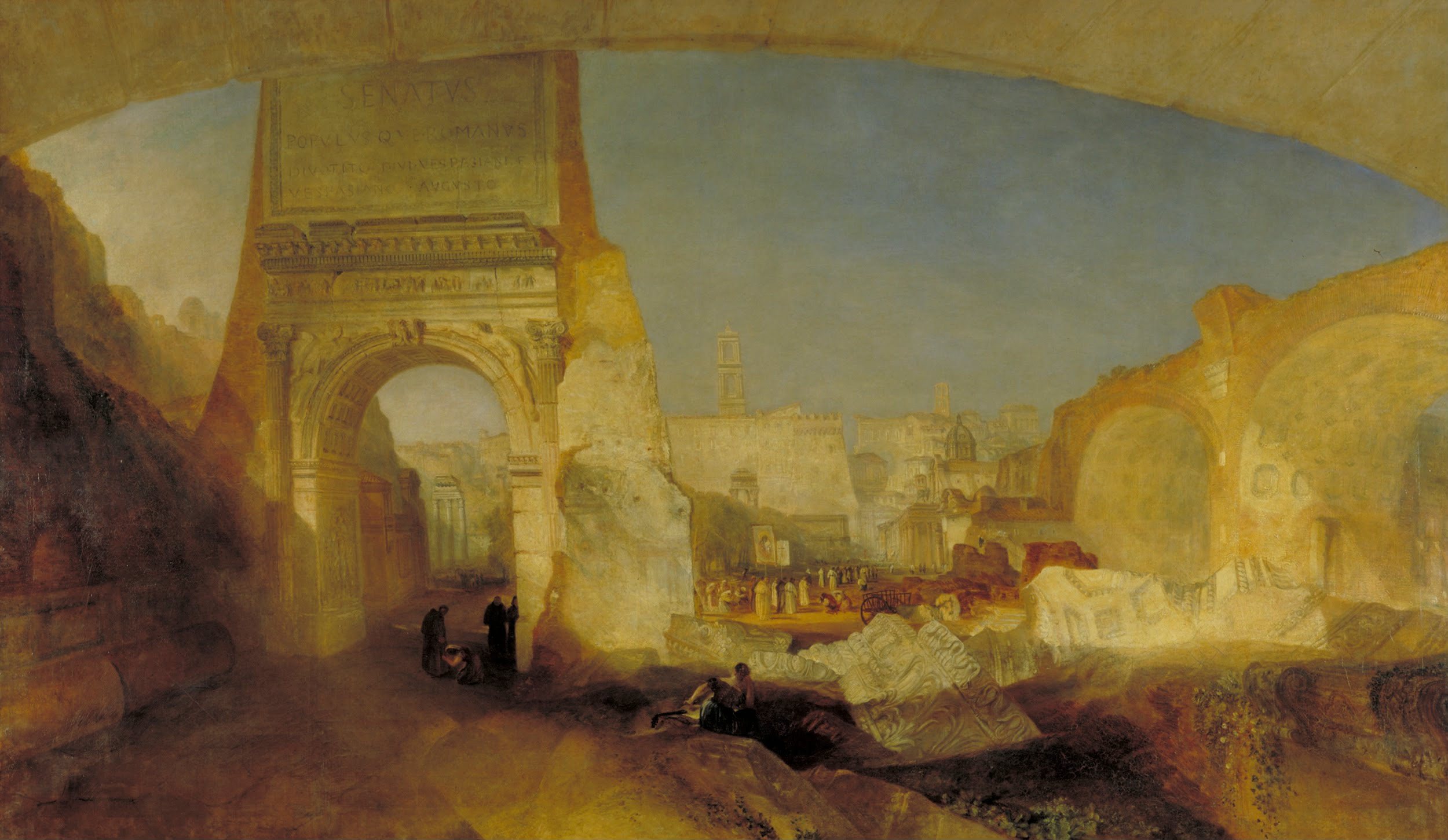
- Artist: J. M. W. Turner
- Year: 1826
- Type: Oil on canvas, cityscape
- Dimensions: 145.7 cm × 163.3 cm (57.4 in × 64.3 in)
- Location: Tate Britain, London
- Website: www.tate.org.uk/...n00504

Forum Romanum is an 1826 cityscape painting by the British artist J.M.W. Turner depicting the Roman Forum in the Italian capital of Rome. Painted during the Regency era it features surviving buildings from Ancient Rome seen in the afternoon light. It looks towards the Capitoline Hill with the Arch of Titus on the left and the Basilica of Constantine on the right.

The work was commissioned by the architect John Soane for his house in Lincoln's Inn Fields. In the event the painting Turner produced was too large for the space that Soane had set aside in his cramped, already overfilled house. Nonetheless he generously sent Turner a cheque for the agreed five hundred guineas. Turner returned the cheque and kept the painting. Art historian Anthony Bailey wrote "If Soane had been sensible, he would have cleared out some of the clutter in his house in order to hang a glowing masterpiece".

== Critical reception ==
In the Royal Academy Exhibition of 1826 Turner exhibited three paintings that featured a predominance of yellow that some fellow painters and art critics felt as excessive and inappropriate: Cologne, the Arrival of a Packet Boat in the Evening, Forum Romanum and Mortlake Terrace: Early Summer Morning.

Even though there were enthusiastic reviews for the paintings, The British Press published the following infamous critique, comparing Turner 's paintings with John Constable's more traditional rural landscape paintings Parham Mill and The Cornfield.

It is impossible there can be a greater contrast of colour than is found between Mr Constable and Mr Turner. In all, we find the same intolerable yellow hue pervading every thing; whether boats or buildings, water or watermen, houses or horses, all is yellow, yellow, nothing but yellow, violently contrasted with blue … we cannot view his works without pain.

== See also ==
- List of paintings by J. M. W. Turner
- Van Tromp's Barge Entering the Texel, an 1831 Turner painting commissioned by Soane

== Bibliography ==
- Bailey, Anthony. J.M.W. Turner: Standing in the Sun. Tate Enterprises Ltd, 2013.
- Costello, Leo. J.M.W. Turner and the Subject of History. Taylor and Francis, 2017.
- Shanes, Eric. The Life and Masterworks of J.M.W. Turner. Parkstone International, 2012.
