= Mortlake Terrace: Early Summer Morning =

Painting by J. M. W. Turner

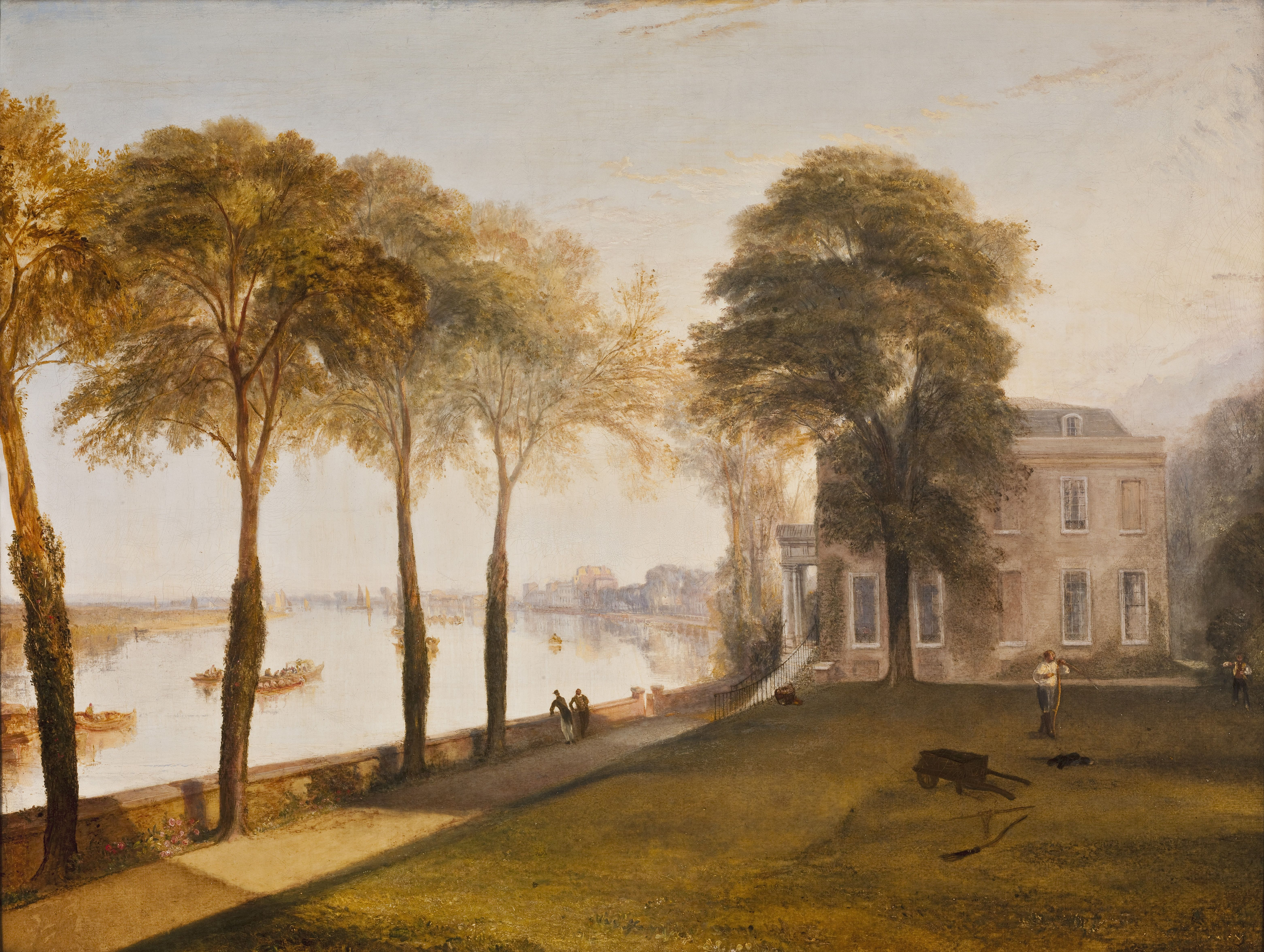
- Artist: J. M. W. Turner
- Year: 1826
- Type: Oil on canvas, landscape
- Dimensions: 93 cm × 123.2 cm (37 in × 48.5 in)
- Location: Frick Collection, New York City

Mortlake Terrace: Early Summer Morning is an 1826 landscape painting by British artist Joseph Mallord William Turner. Turner was commissioned by William Moffat, the owner of Mortlake Terrace, to paint this view of the house as well a companion piece looking westwards from the house along the Thames, Mortlake Terrace: Summer's Evening.

Mortlake Terrace is located on Mortlake High Street with the River Thames to its rear. The painting looks eastward along the Thames, with Barnes Terrace in the distance.

== Critical reception ==
In the Royal Academy Exhibition of 1826, Turner exhibited three paintings that featured a predominance of yellow that some fellow painters and art critics felt as excessive and inappropriate: Cologne, the Arrival of a Packet Boat in the Evening, Forum Romanum and Mortlake Terrace: Early Summer Morning.

Even though there were enthusiastic reviews for the paintings, The British Press published the following infamous critique, comparing Turner 's paintings with John Constable's more traditional rural landscape paintings, Parham Mill and The Cornfield:

It is impossible there can be a greater contrast of colour than is found between Mr Constable and Mr Turner. In all, we find the same intolerable yellow hue pervading every thing; whether boats or buildings, water or watermen, houses or horses, all is yellow, yellow, nothing but yellow, violently contrasted with blue … we cannot view his works without pain.

== Exhibition History ==
It was exhibited at the Royal Academy's 1826 Summer Exhibition at Somerset House. It is now in the Frick Collection in New York. The companion piece is now in the National Gallery of Art in Washington.

== See also ==
- List of paintings by J. M. W. Turner

== Bibliography ==
- Hamilton, James. Turner - A Life. Sceptre, 1998.
- Reynolds, Graham. Turner. Thames & Hudson, 2022.
- Shanes, Eric. Turner: The Life and Masterworks. Parkstone, 2004.
