= The Hunting of Chevy Chase =

Painting by Edwin Landseer

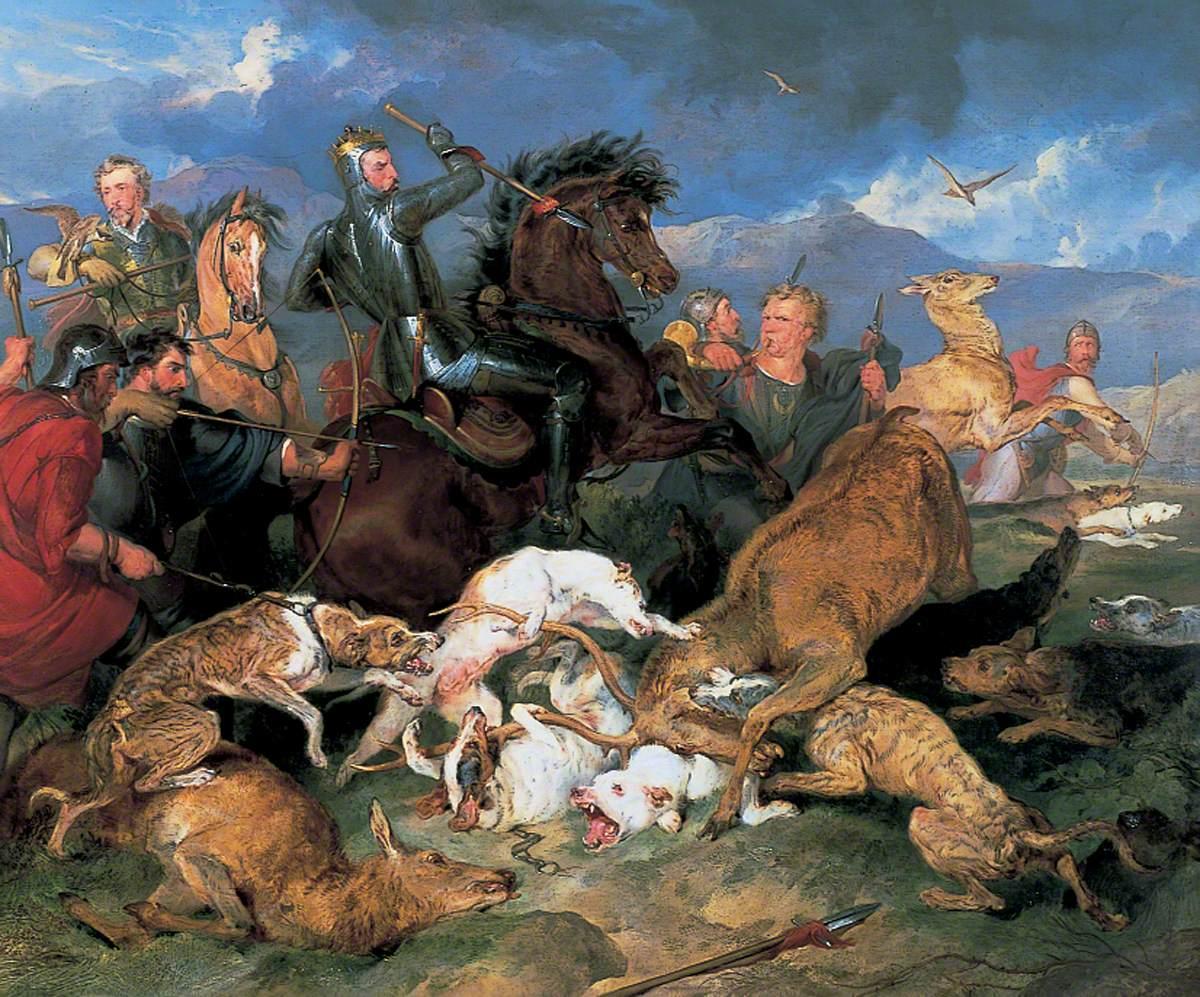
- Artist: Edwin Landseer
- Year: 1826
- Type: Oil on canvas, history painting
- Dimensions: 143.5 cm × 170.8 cm (56.5 in × 67.2 in)
- Location: Birmingham Museum and Art Gallery, Birmingham

The Hunting of Chevy Chase is an 1826 history painting by the British artist Edwin Landseer. Inspired by Medieval "The Ballad of Chevy Chase", it depicts a hunting scene in the Cheviot Hills on the Anglo-Scottish border. The English Duke of Northumberland and the Scottish Earl of Douglas engaged in a furious feud. When Northumberland announced he would go hunting on a disputed stretch of land known as Chevy Chase, Douglas and his followers came to confront him. In the ensuing battle both noblemen were slain. Landseer portrays the moment before the battle with Northumberland hunting stags with hounds. The composition of the picture makes reference to the 1616 painting The Wolf and Fox Hunt by Rubens.

The work was displayed at the Royal Academy Exhibition of 1826 at Somerset House and at the British Institution in Pall Mall in 1827. The painting was commissioned by the aristocrat and art collector Duke of Bedford. It remained in the family until sold at Christie's in 1951 where it was acquired by the Art Fund and donated to the Birmingham Museum and Art Gallery.

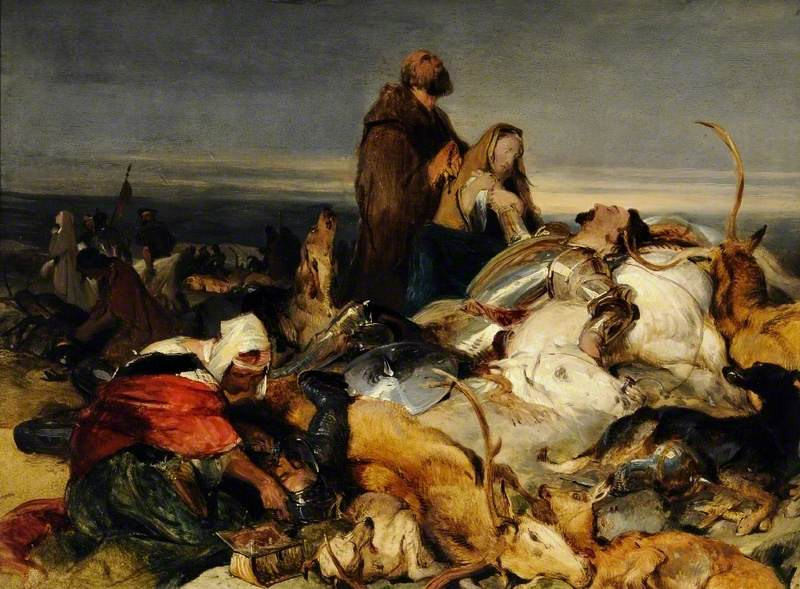
The Battle of Chevy Chase

Landseer began work on a sequel The Battle of Chevy Chase, intended as a pendant painting but ultimately left unfinished, an oil sketch for which is now in the Graves Art Gallery in Sheffield. The painting featured the aftermath of the fighting with the corpse of Northumberland laying on his dead horse amidst the slain deer and distraught widows.

== Bibliography ==
- Noon, Patrick & Bann, Stephen. Constable to Delacroix: British Art and the French Romantics. Tate, 2003.
- Ormond, Richard. Sir Edwin Landseer. Philadelphia Museum of Art, 1981.
