= Portrait of George Canning =

1826 painting by Thomas Lawrence

George Canning
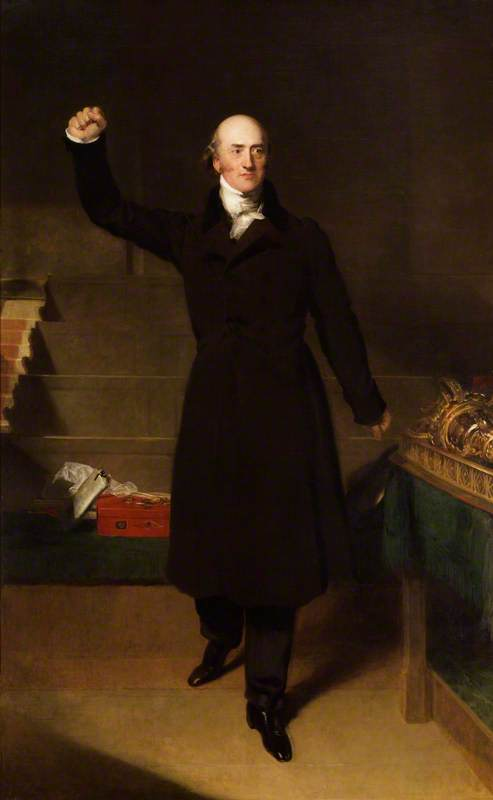
- Artist: Thomas Lawrence
- Year: 1826
- Type: Oil on canvas, portrait
- Dimensions: 238.1 cm × 147.3 cm (93.7 in × 58.0 in)
- Location: National Portrait Gallery, London

George Canning is an 1826 full-length portrait by the British artist Thomas Lawrence of the statesman George Canning, a leading Tory politician. His career had been seriously disrupted by his 1809 duel with his cabinet colleague Lord Castlereagh, until his appointment as Foreign Secretary in 1822 after Castlereagh's suicide led him to a revival. He is shown speaking in the House of Commons. It was painted around the same time as Lawrence was depicting Canning's colleague the Duke of Wellington. Commissioned by Robert Peel, it was one of eight portraits he exhibited at the Royal Academy that year. It received qualified praise from fellow painter John Constable. The following year Canning became Prime Minister in succession to Lord Liverpool, but suffering from poor health died at Chiswick House after just 119 days in office. The paining was displayed at the Royal Academy Exhibition of 1826 at Somerset House and again at the British Institution in Pall Mall in 1830. It is now part of the collection of the National Portrait Gallery in London.

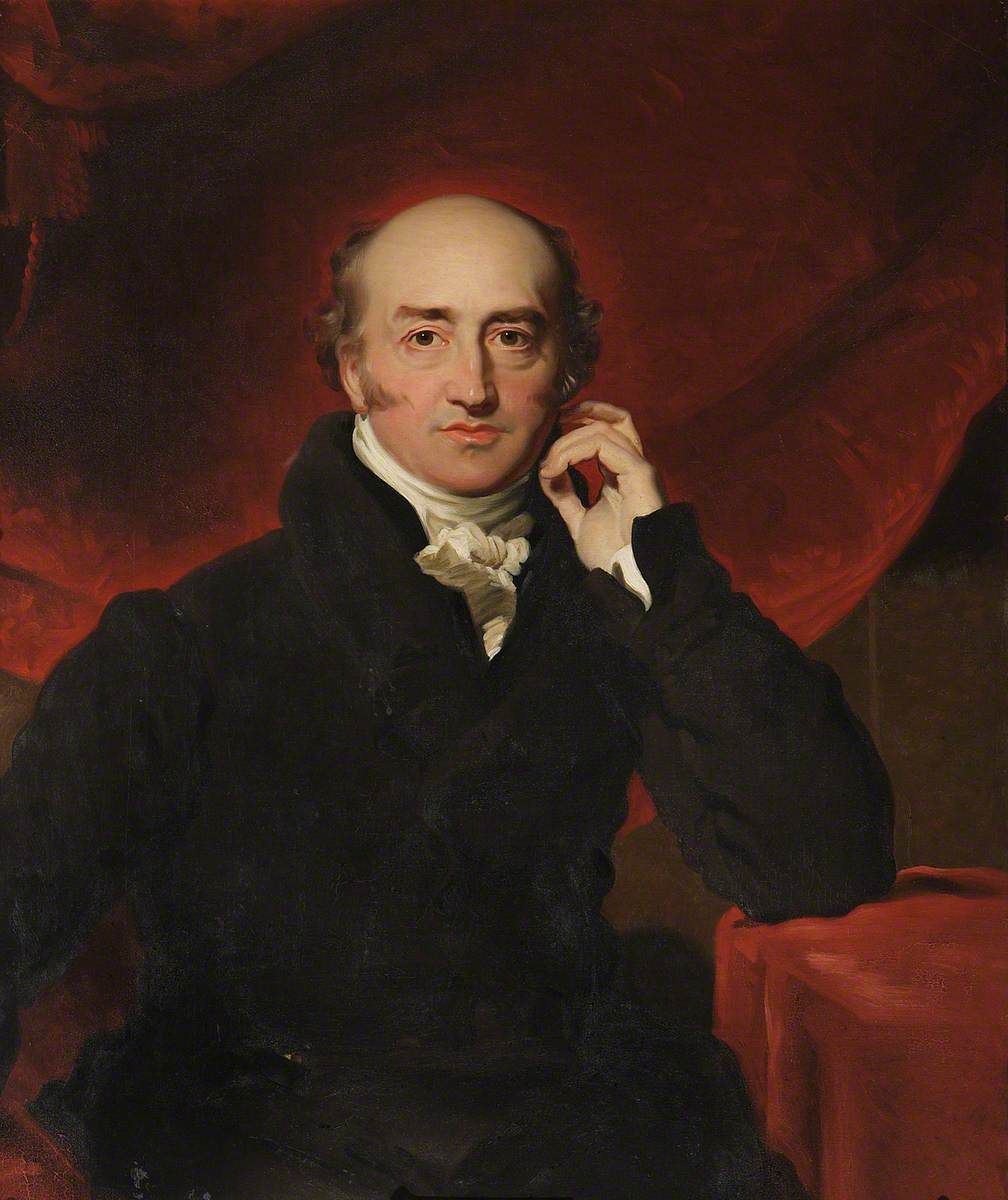
A more intimate portrait of Canning, painted around the same time.

== Bibliography ==
- Davies, Huw J. Wellington's Wars: The Making of a Military Genius. Yale University Press, 2012.
- Levey, Michael. Sir Thomas Lawrence. Yale University Press, 2005.

== See also ==
- Portrait of Lord Liverpool, an 1820 work by Lawrence showing Canning's colleague and predecessor as Prime Minister
- Portrait of Lord Goderich, an 1824 work by Lawrence depicting his successor as Prime Minister
