= The Judgement of Paris (Etty) =

Painting by William Etty

The Judgment of Paris
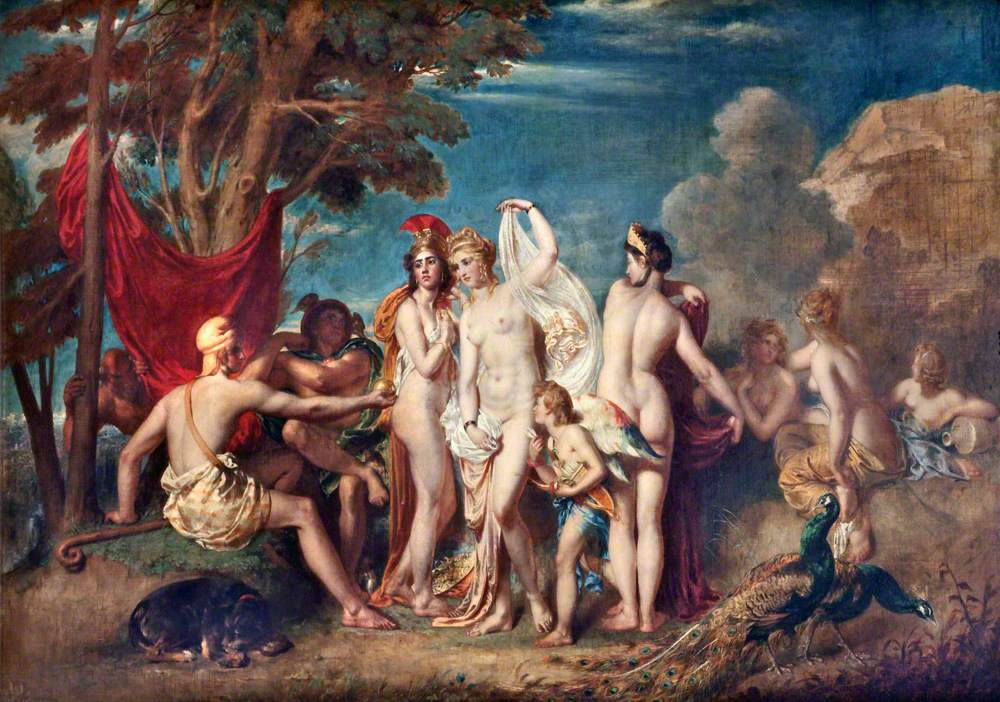
- Artist: William Etty
- Year: 1826
- Type: Oil on canvas, history painting
- Dimensions: 183.5 cm × 277 cm (72.2 in × 109 in)
- Location: Lady Lever Art Gallery, Merseyside

The Judgement of Paris is an 1826 history painting by the British artist William Etty. It depicts the Judgment of Paris from Greek Mythology, a popular subject in art. Paris is made to judge which of the goddesses Aphrodite, Hera and Athena is the fairest. He is shown presenting the apple of discord to the winner Aphrodite, a choice that would later lead to the outbreak of the Trojan War.

The York-born Etty became famous for his depictions of nude men and women. Commissioned by Earl of Darnley, this was one of the largest and most ambitious works he produced. The painting was displayed at the Royal Academy Exhibition of 1826 at Somerset House in London. Today it in the collection of the Lady Lever Art Gallery in Cheshire, having been acquired in 1922 when the work was transferred to the gallery by Lord Leverhulme from his own private collection.

A later work by Etty of the same scene The Choice of Paris was displayed at the Royal Academy Exhibition of 1846 and is now on display at the Scarborough Art Gallery.

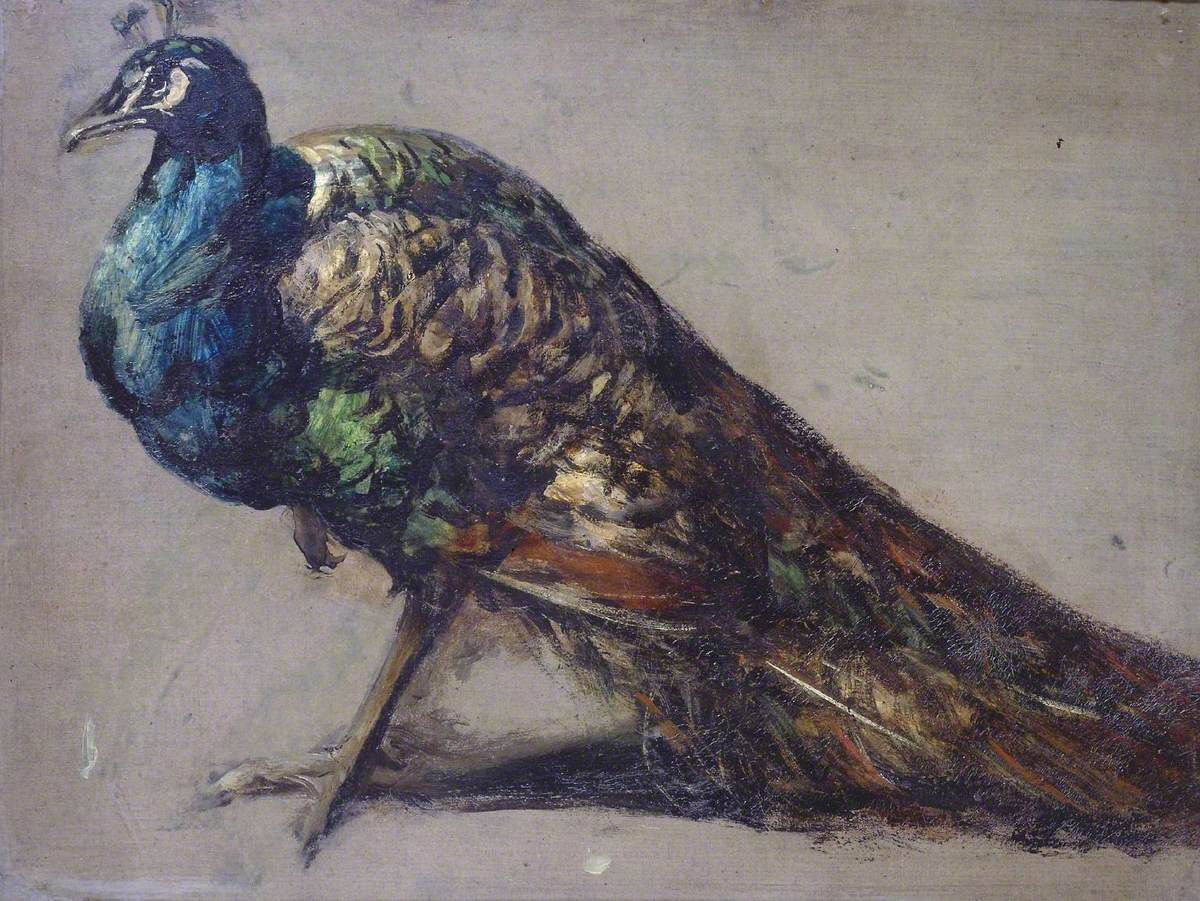
Study of a Peacock for ‘The Judgement of Paris’ (1826), National Gallery

== Bibliography ==
- Kidson, Alex. Earlier British Paintings in the Lady Lever Art Gallery. 1999.
- Robinson, Leonard. William Etty: The Life and Art. McFarland, 2007.
