= Royal Academy Exhibition of 1826 =

1826 art exhibition in London

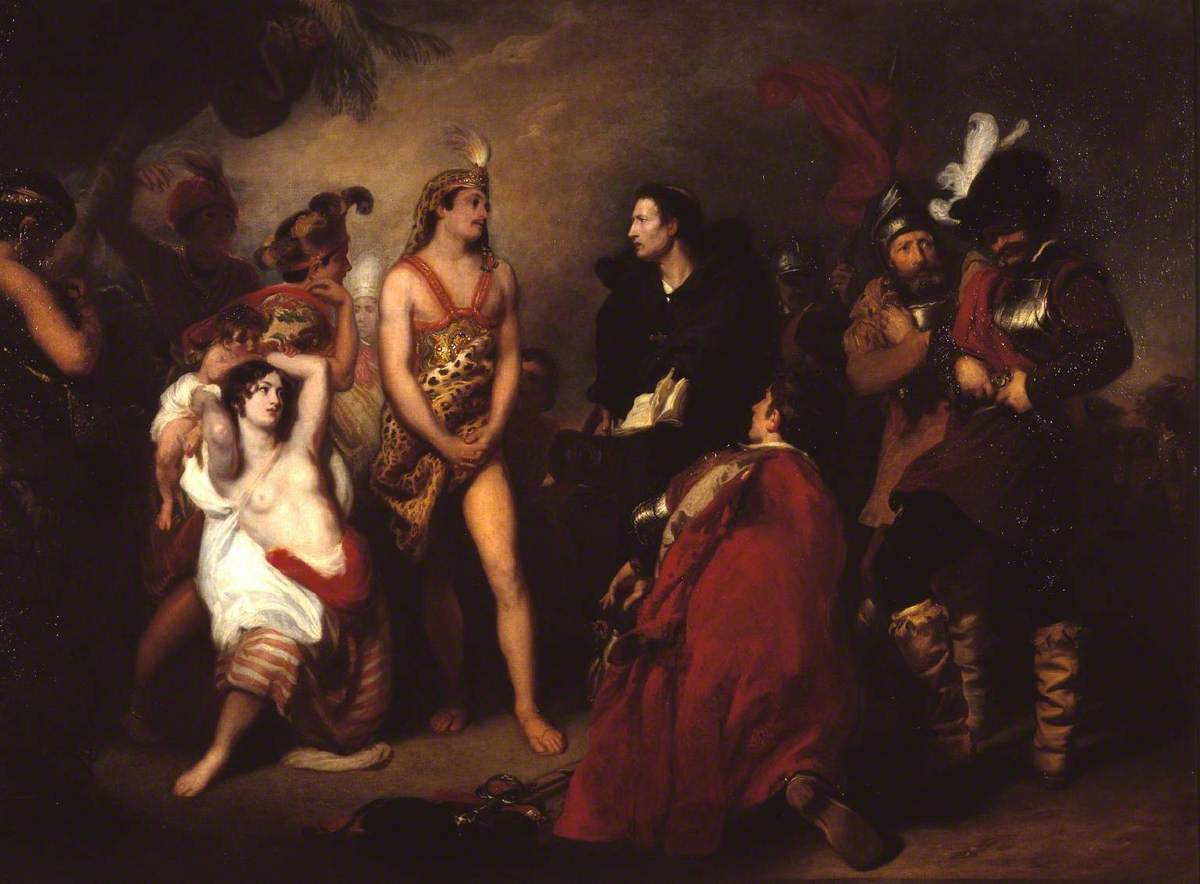
The First Interview Between the Spaniards and the Peruvians by Henry Perronet Briggs

The Royal Academy Exhibition of 1826 was an art exhibition held at Somerset House in London between 1 May and 8 July 1826. It was fifty eight annual Summer Exhibition of the British Royal Academy of Arts. It featured submissions from leading painters, sculptors and architects of the Regency era.

The President of the Royal Academy Thomas Lawrence attracted some of the greatest praise of the exhibition for the eight portrait paintings he displayed. There included his Portrait of George Canning and a Portrait of Robert Peel, then serving in the government of Lord Liverpool as foreign secretary and home secretary respectively. The works had been commissioned by Peel, a third painting of Lord Liverpool exhibited at the academy the following year.

Two of the notable history paintings on display were Edwin Landseer's The Hunting of Chevy Chase and Benjamin Robert Haydon's Venus and Anchises. It was the first time in seventeen years that Haydon had displayed a work at the academy due to a boycott. By contrast the younger Landseer was a rising young painter who would go on to be a prominent figure in the establishment. Landseer portrayed a scene inspired by a popular ballad and the picture was greeted with enthusiasm by critics.

John Constable exhibited two landscape paintings. Parham Mill and The Cornfield. Although he hoped to have his The Opening of Waterloo Bridge ready in time for the exhibition, it wasn't finally displayed until the 1832 edition.

The Scottish painter David Wilkie was a notable absentee, following a breakdown in his health he briefly quit painting and travelled around Continental Europe.

== Gallery ==
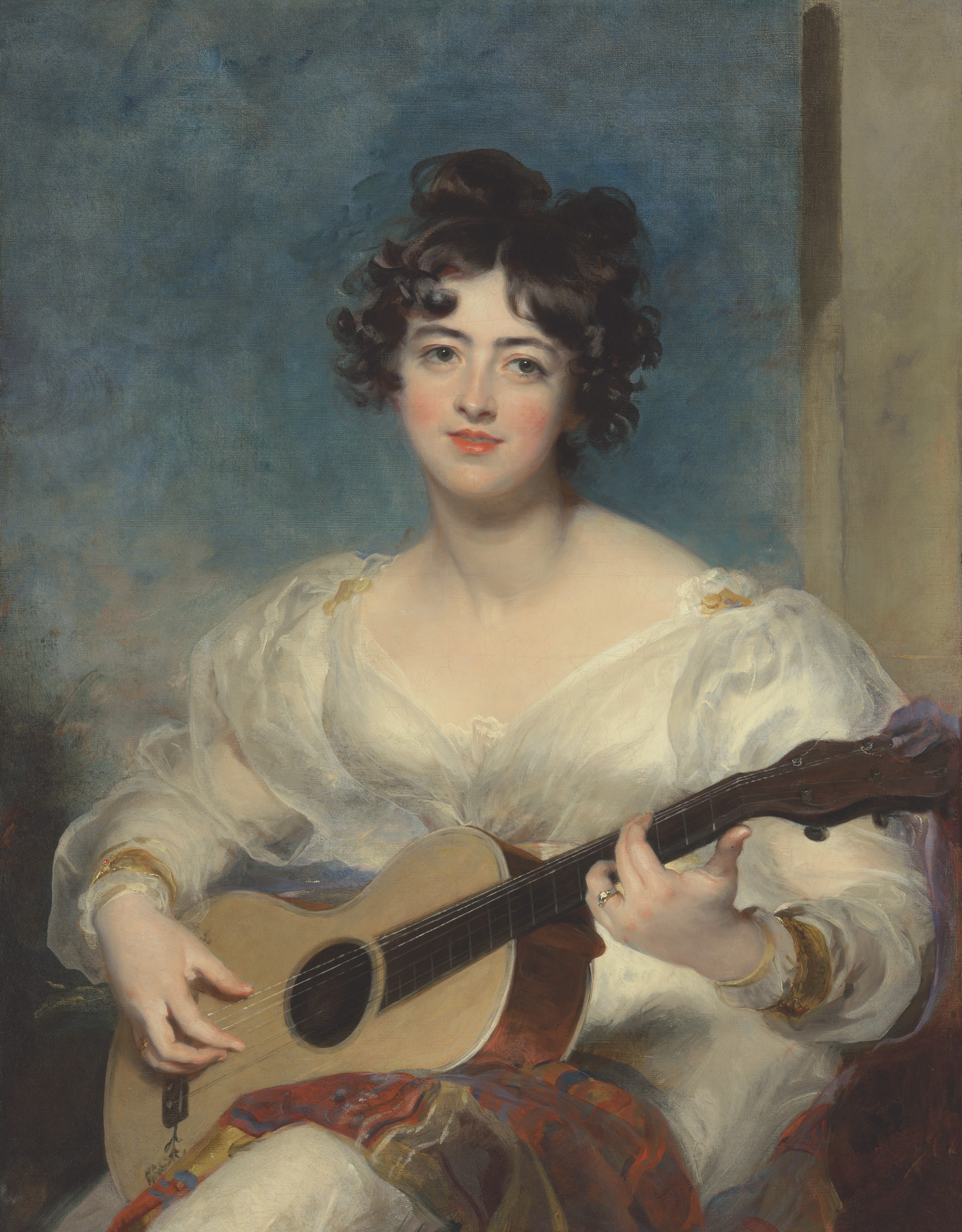
Portrait of Lady Wallscourt by Thomas Lawrence

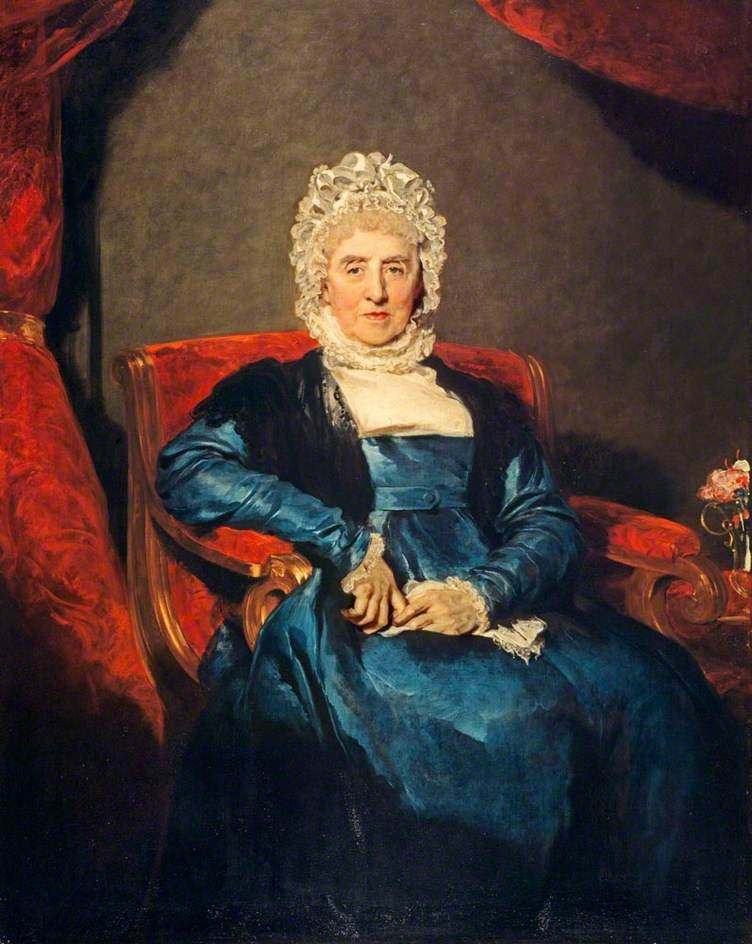
Portrait of Lady Manners by Thomas Lawrence

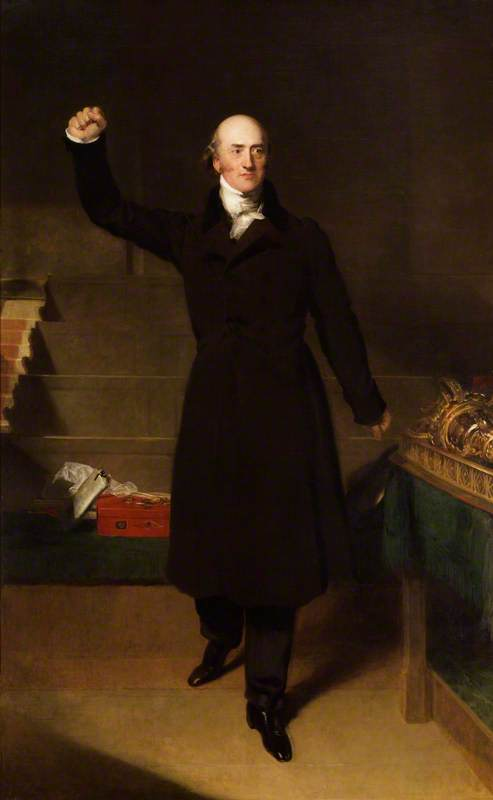
Portrait of George Canning by Thomas Lawrence

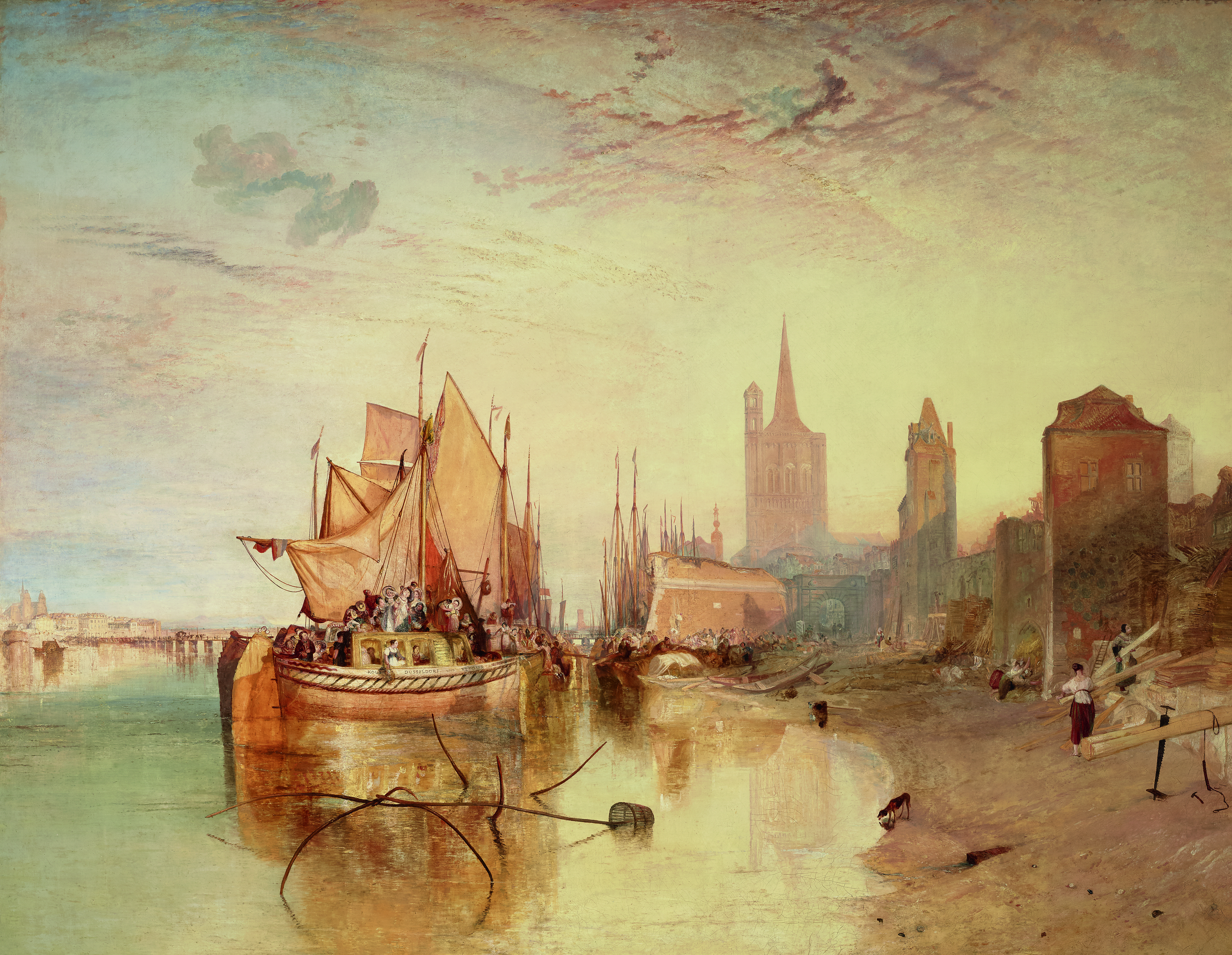
Cologne, the Arrival of a Packet Boat in the Evening by J.M.W. Turner

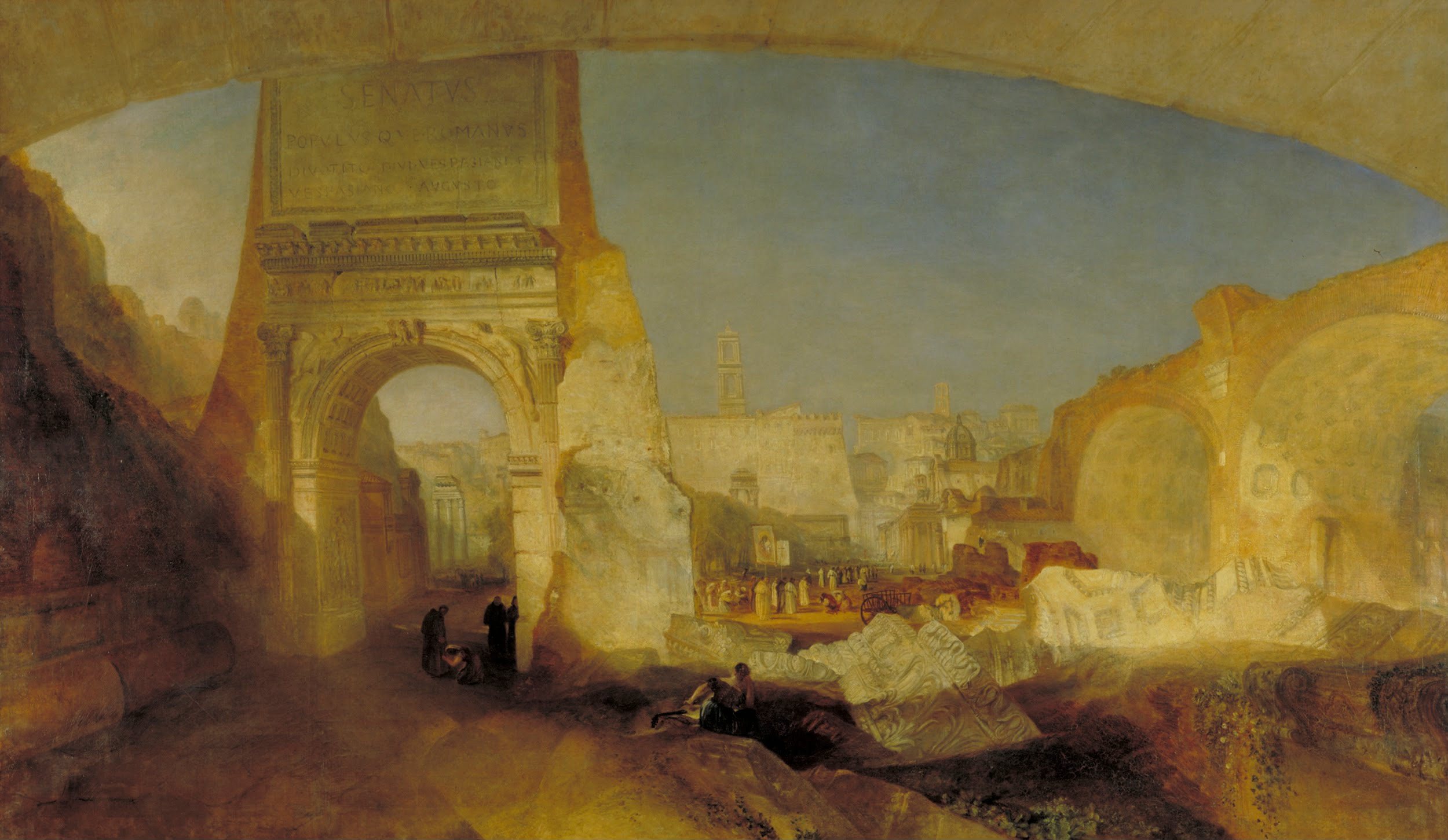
Forum Romanum by J.M.W. Turner

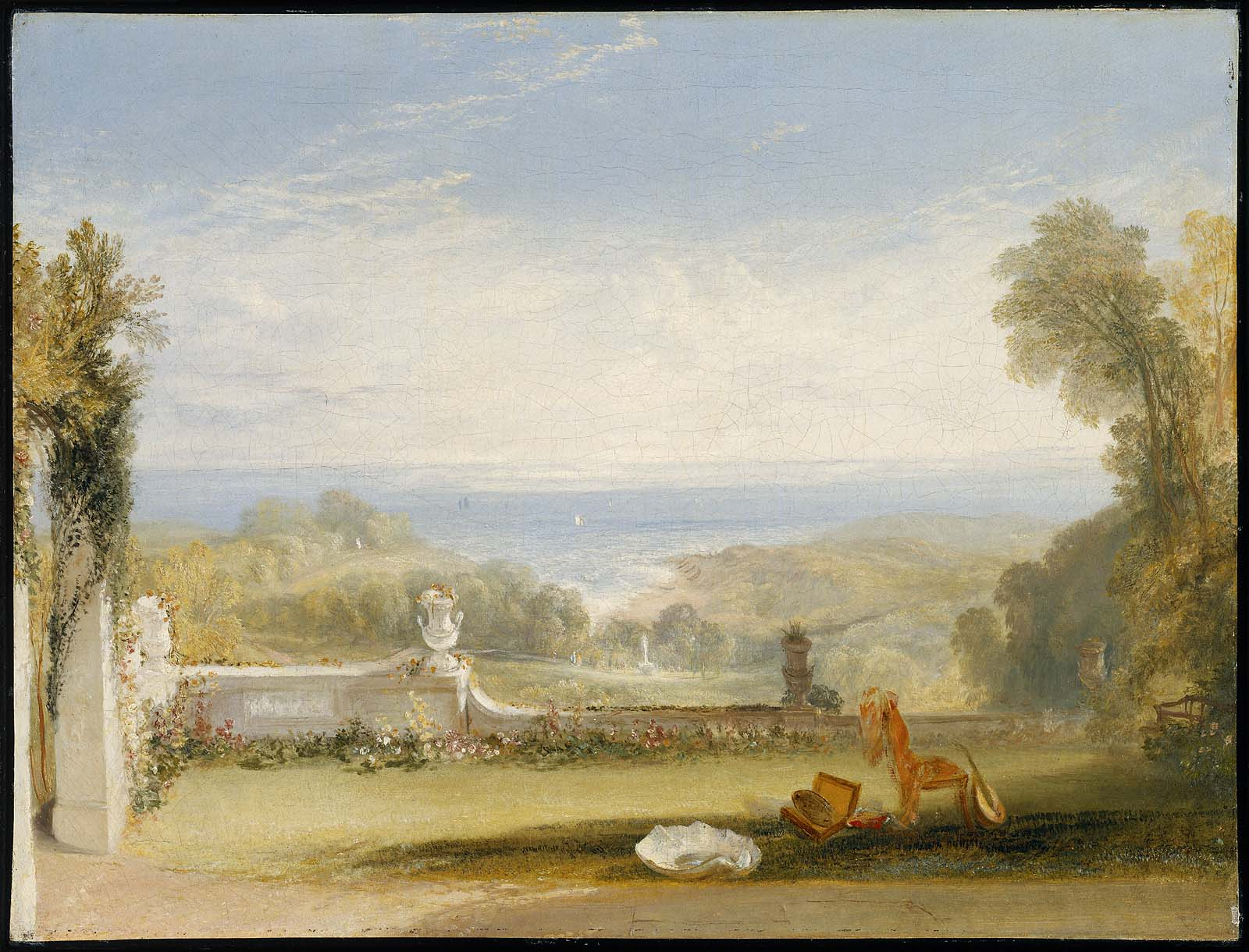
View from the Terrace of a Villa at Niton, Isle of Wight by J.M.W. Turner

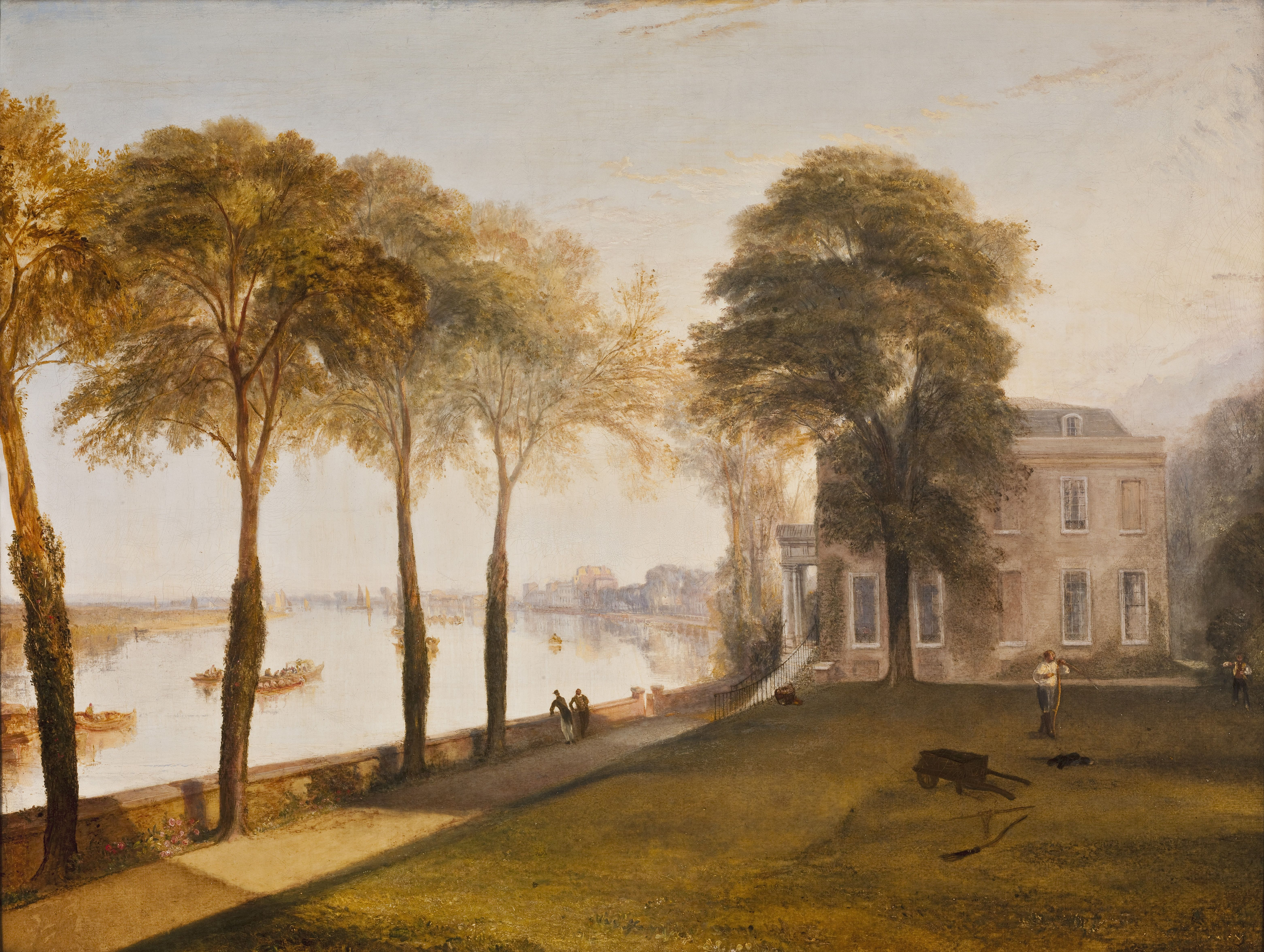
Mortlake Terrace: Early Summer Morning by J.M.W. Turner

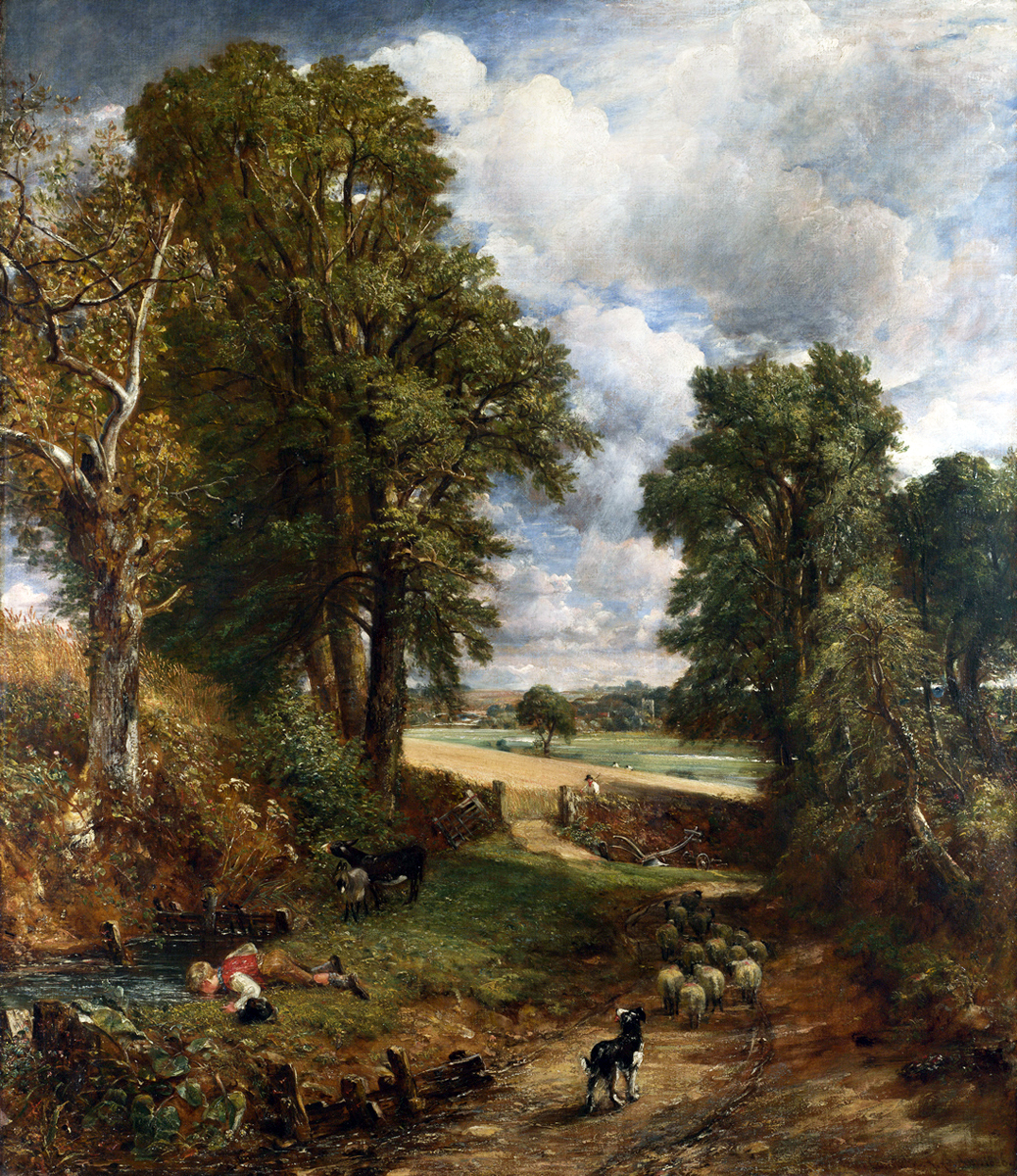
The Cornfield by John Constable

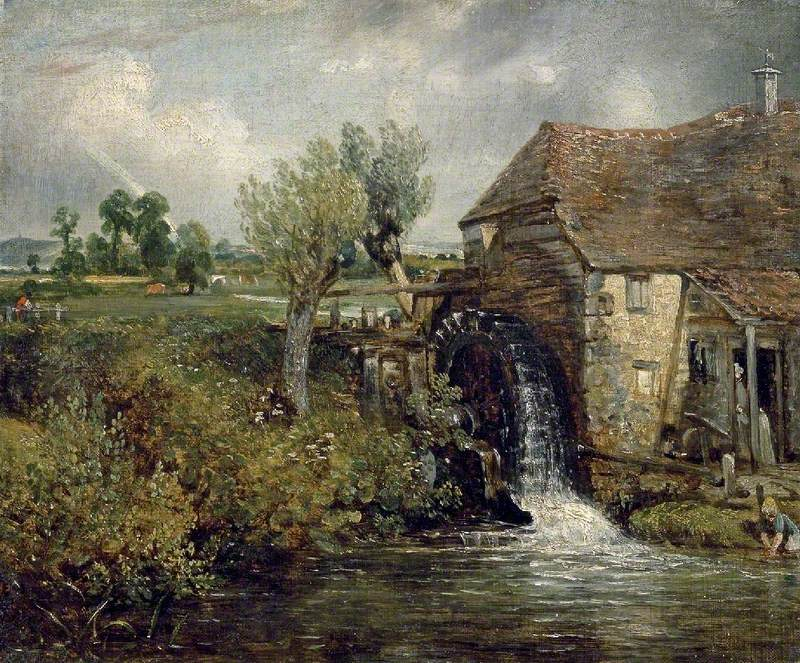
Parham Mill by John Constable

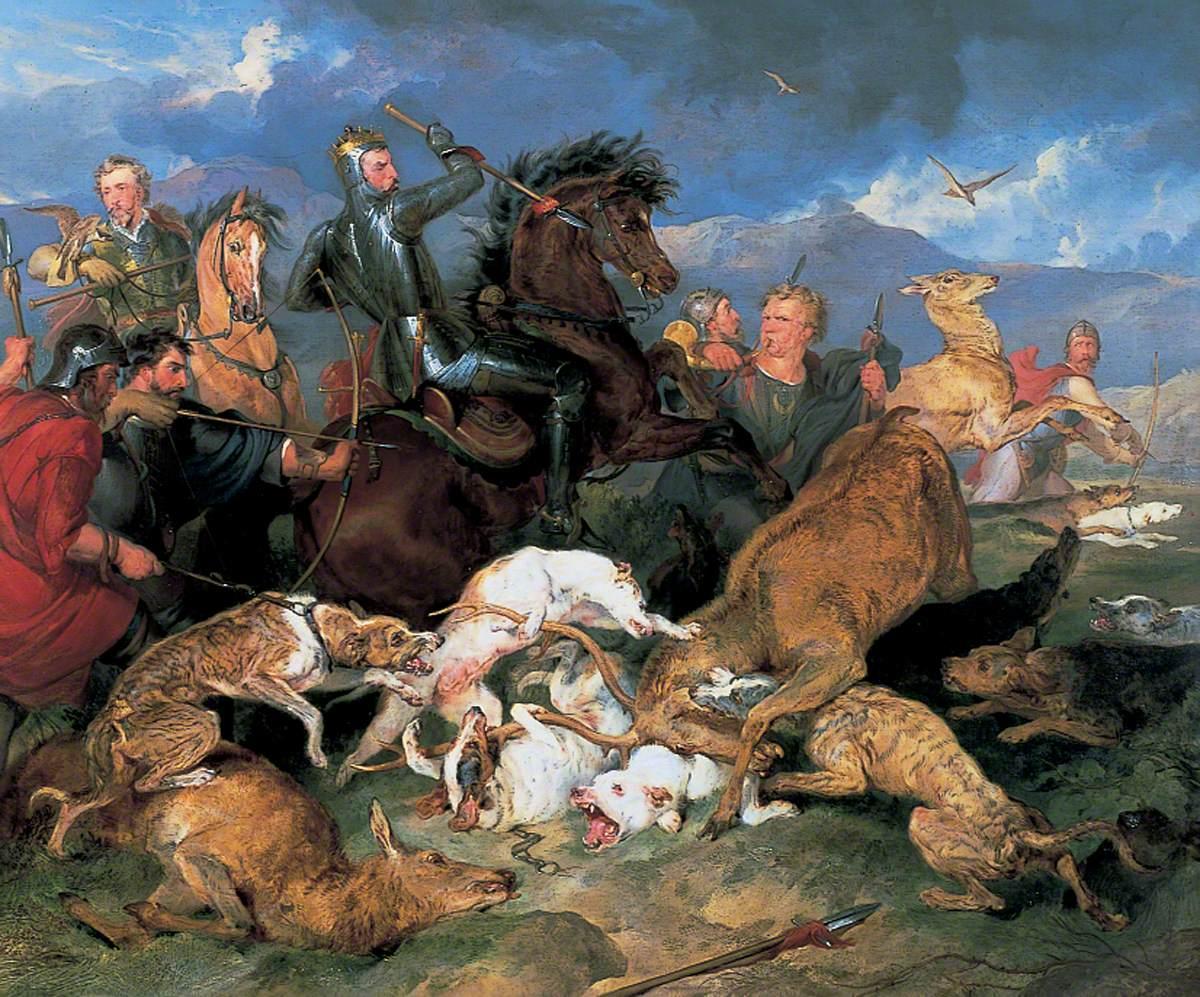
The Hunting of Chevy Chase by Edwin Landseer

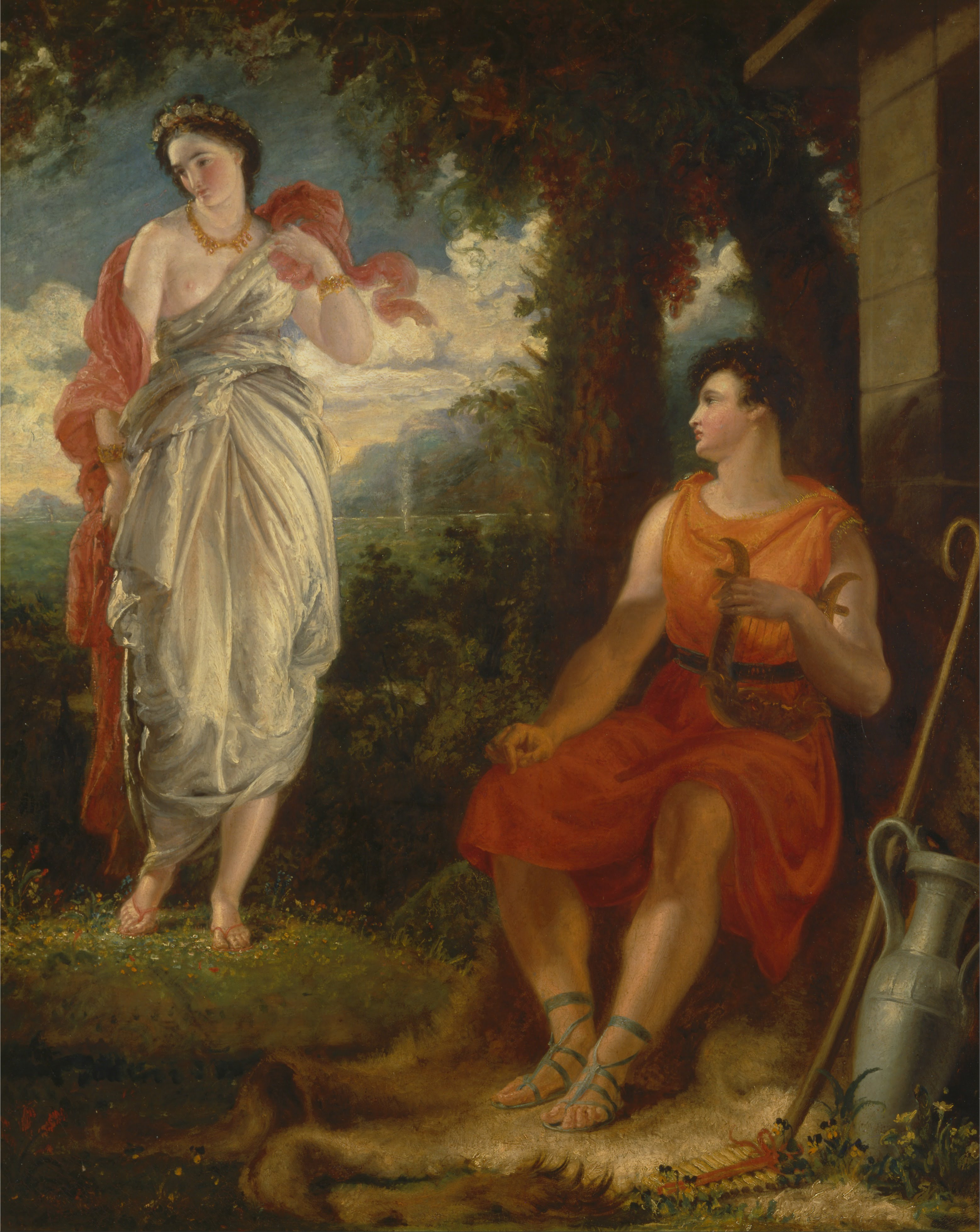
Venus and Anchises by Benjamin Robert Haydon

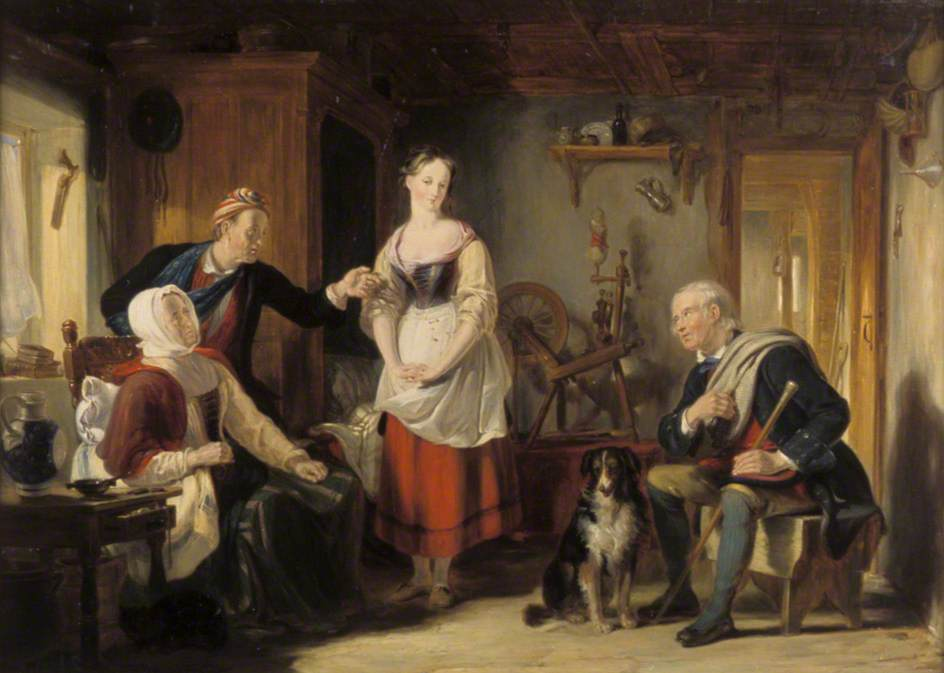
The Ballad of Old Robin Gray by William Allan

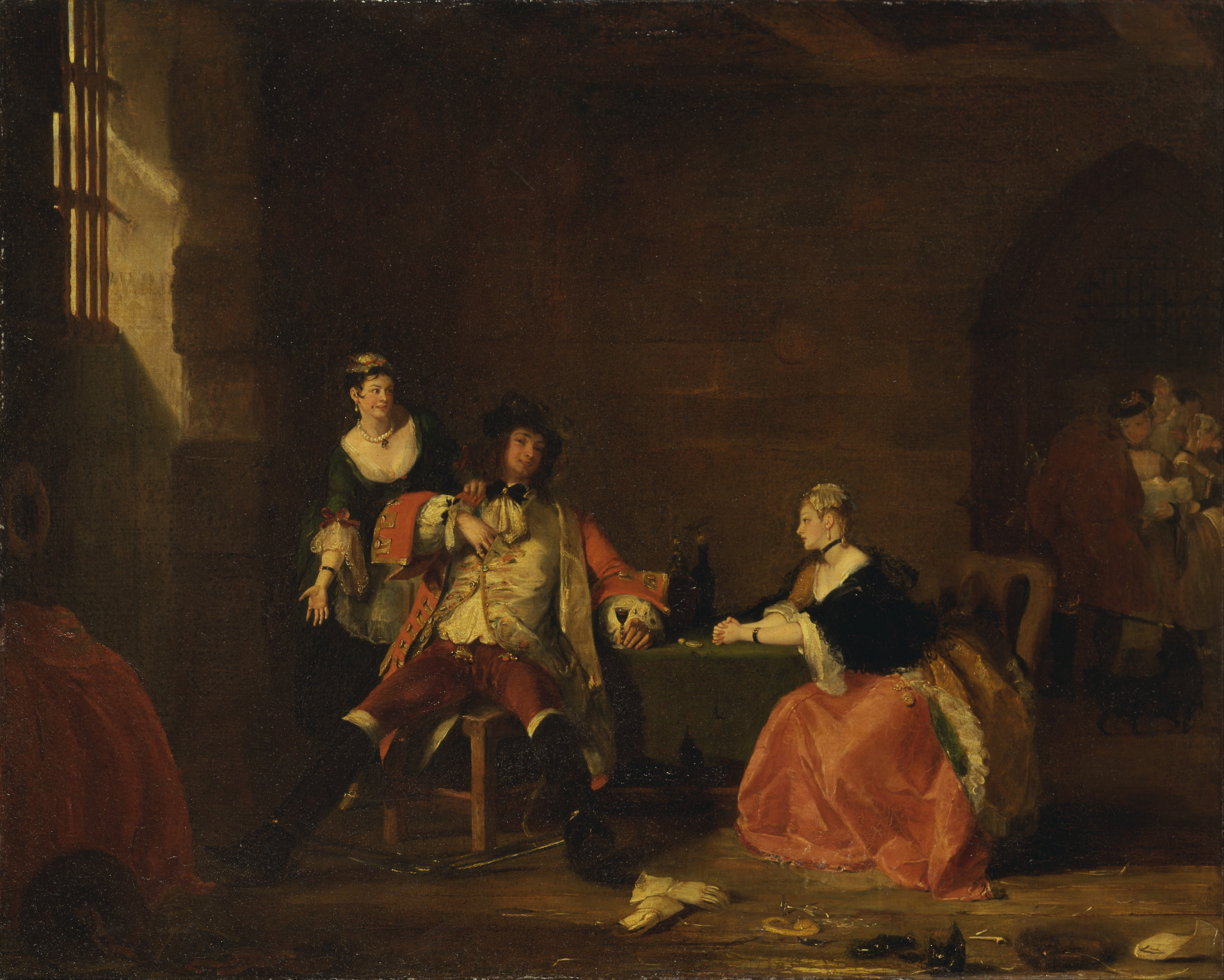
Captain Macheath Upbraided by Polly and Lucy by Gilbert Stuart Newton

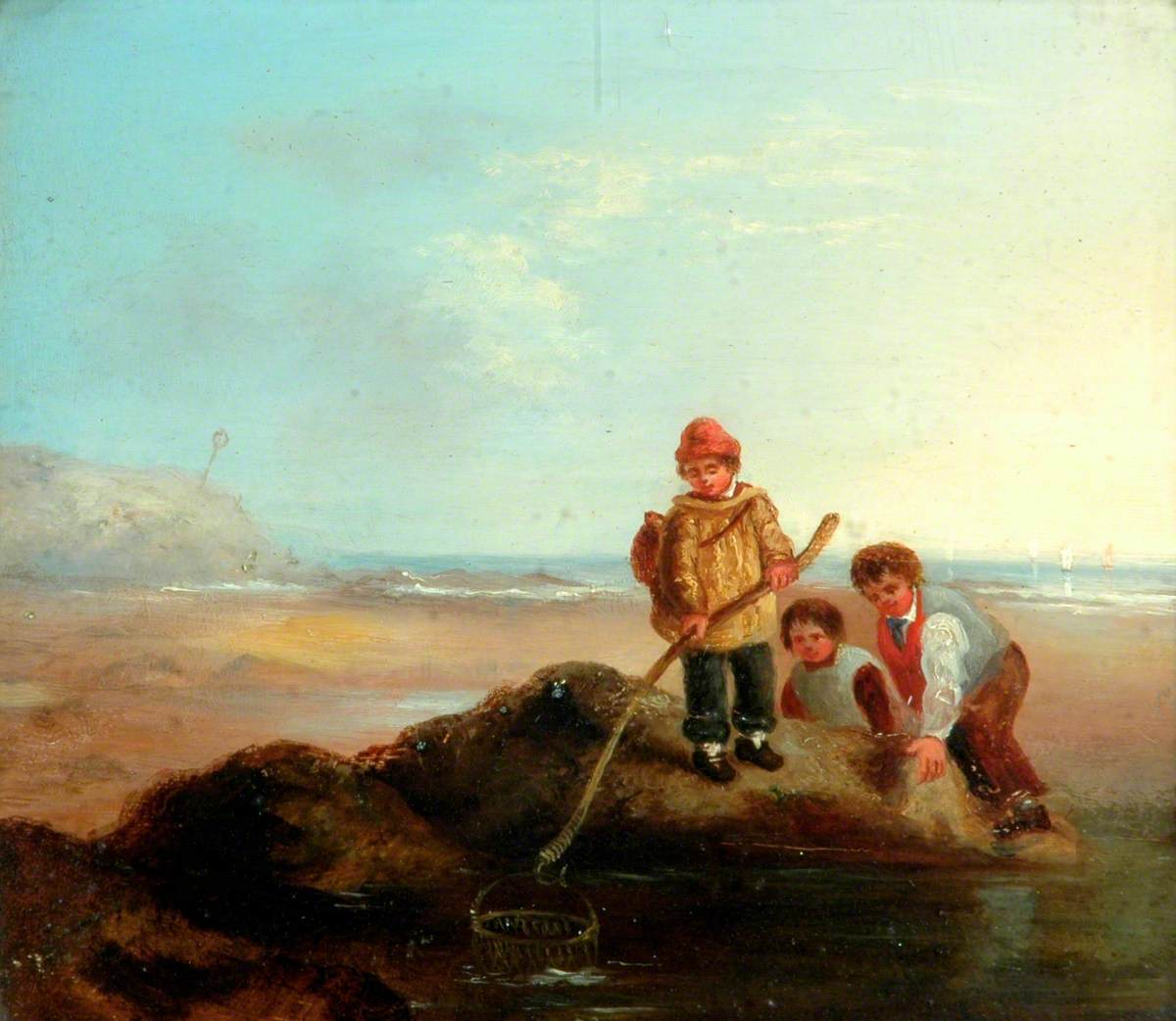
The Young Shrimpers by William Collins

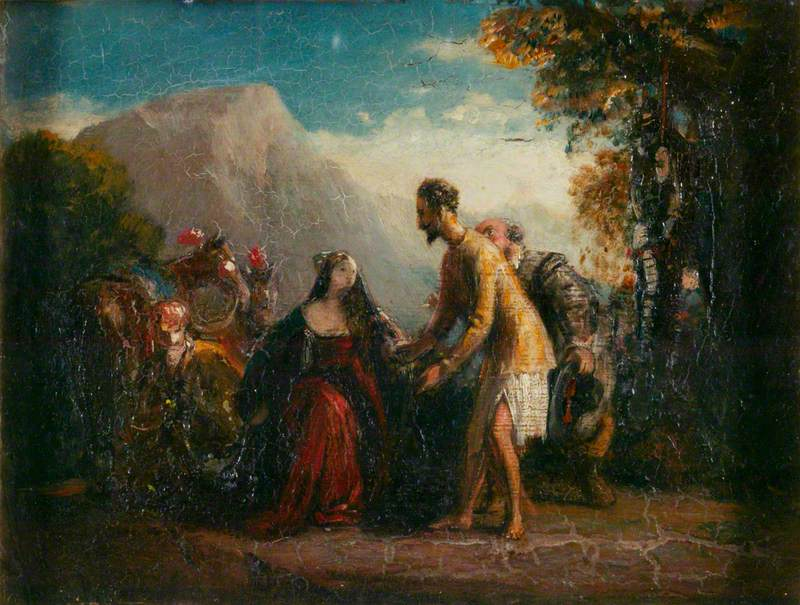
Don Quixote and Dorothea by Charles Robert Leslie

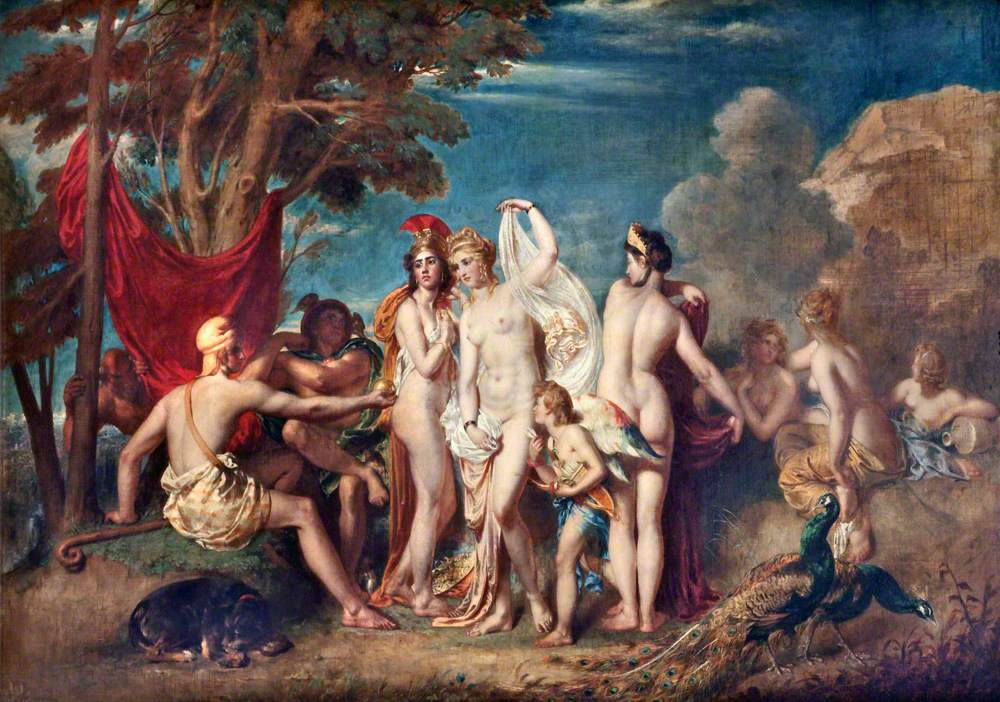
The Judgment of Paris by William Etty

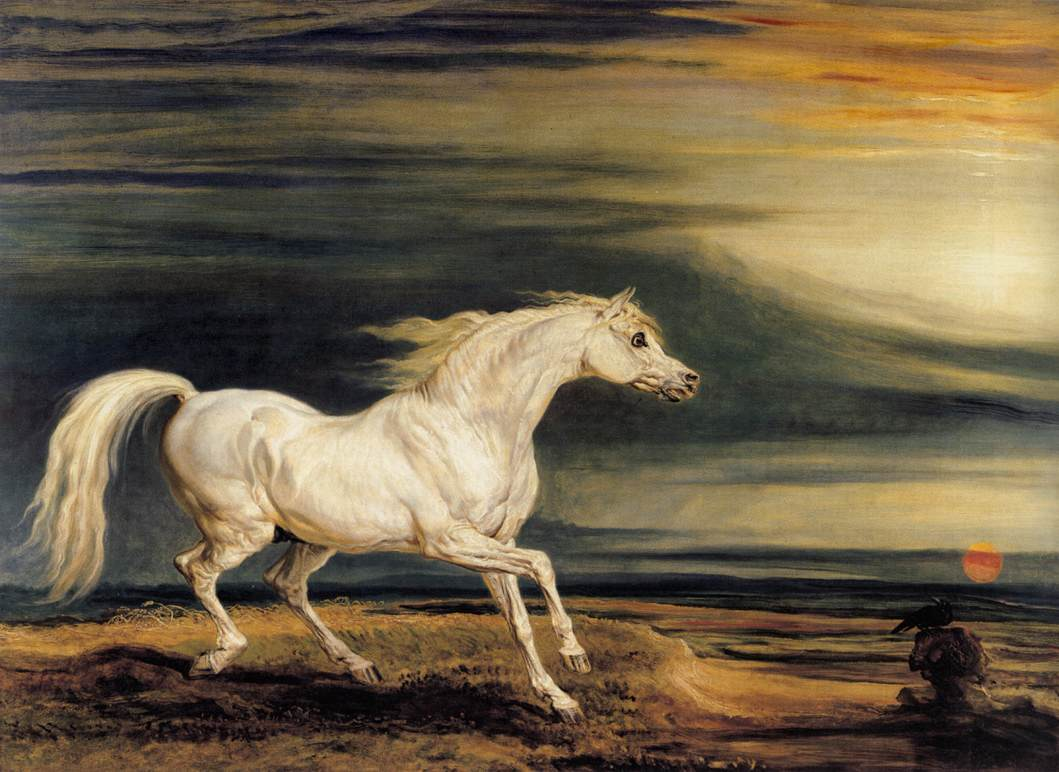
Marengo by James Ward

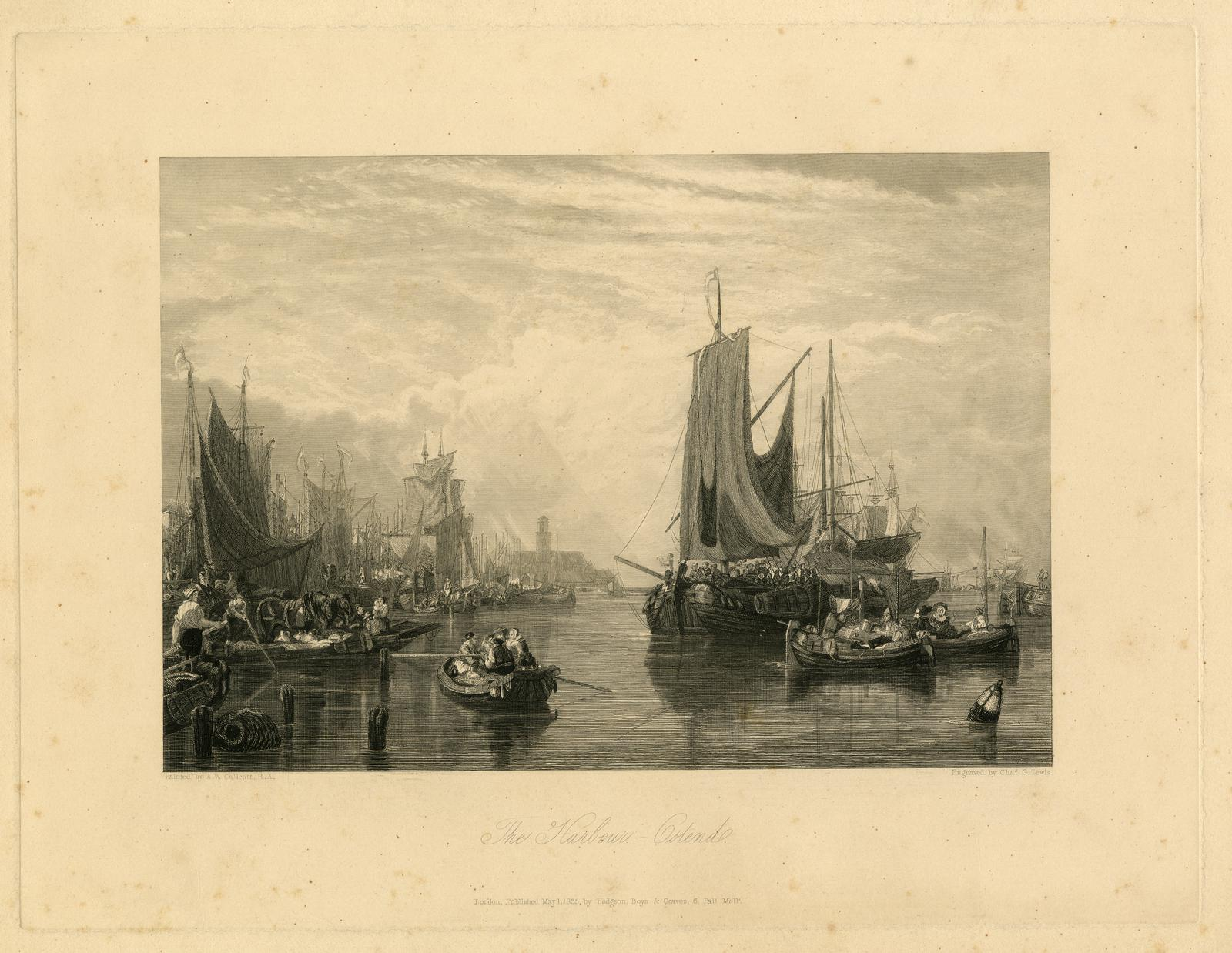
The Quay at Antwerp, engraving based on the painting by Augustus Wall Callcott

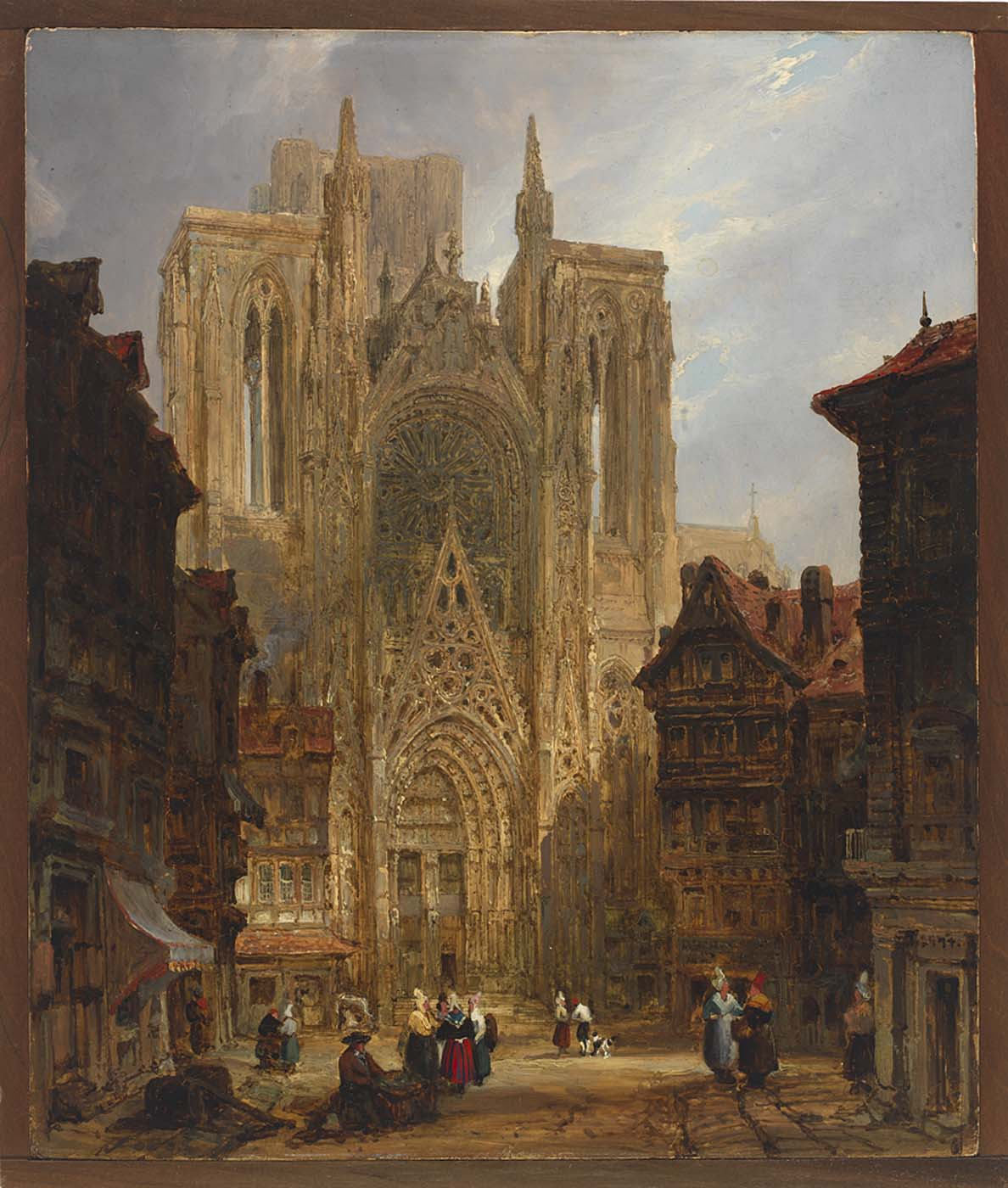
Rouen Cathedral by David Roberts

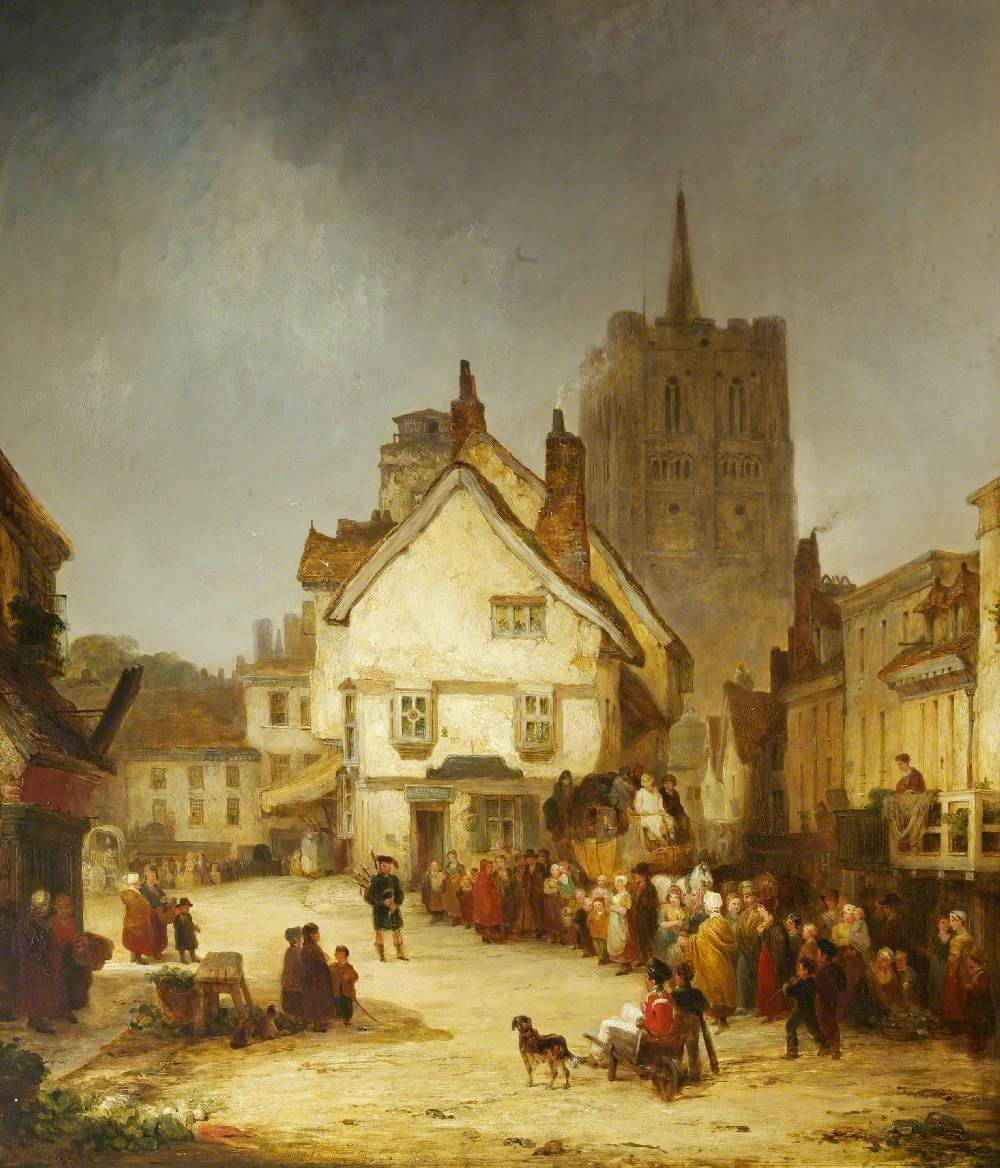
St Albans by George Jones

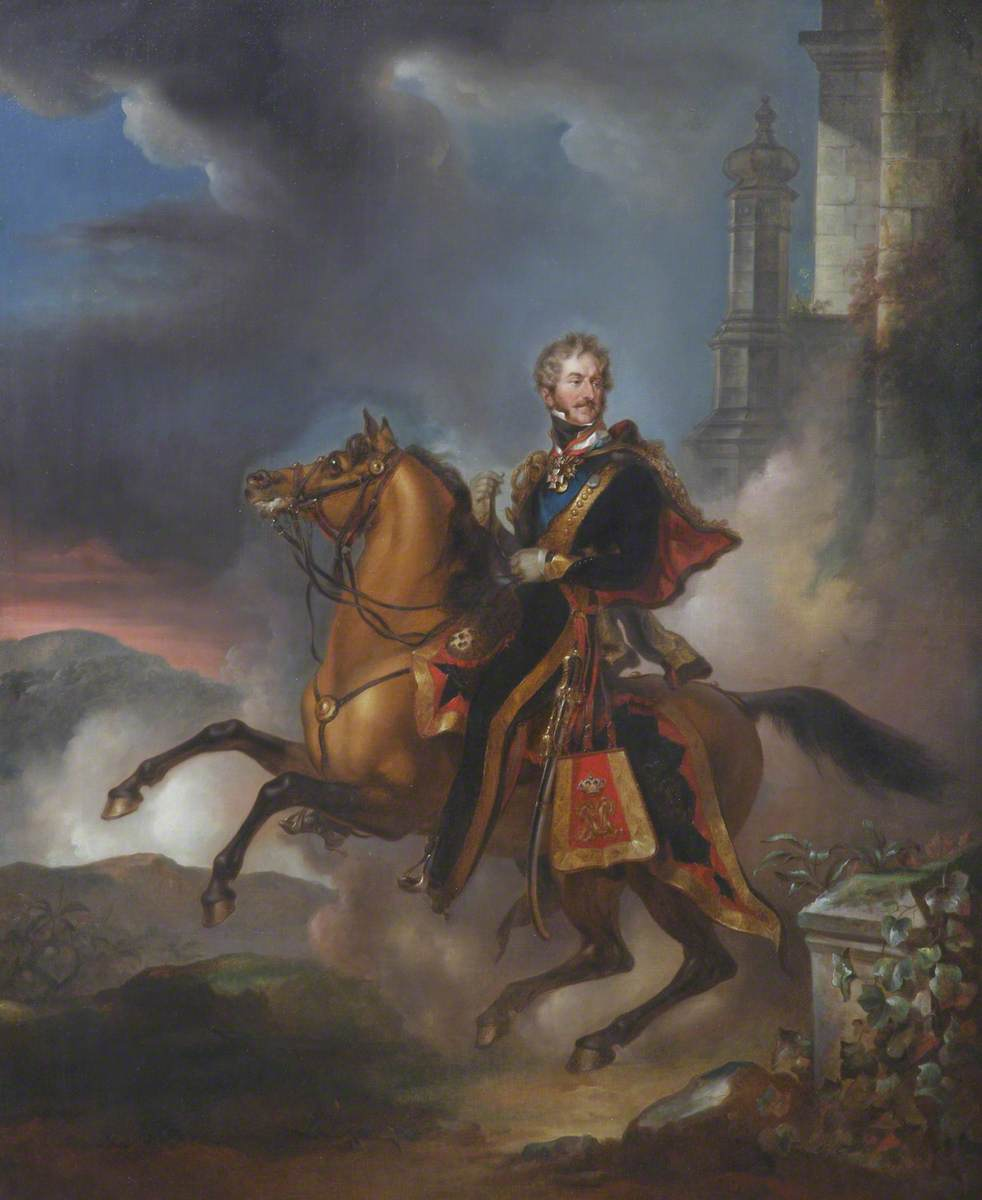
Portrait of the Marquis of Anglesey by Peter Edward Stroehling

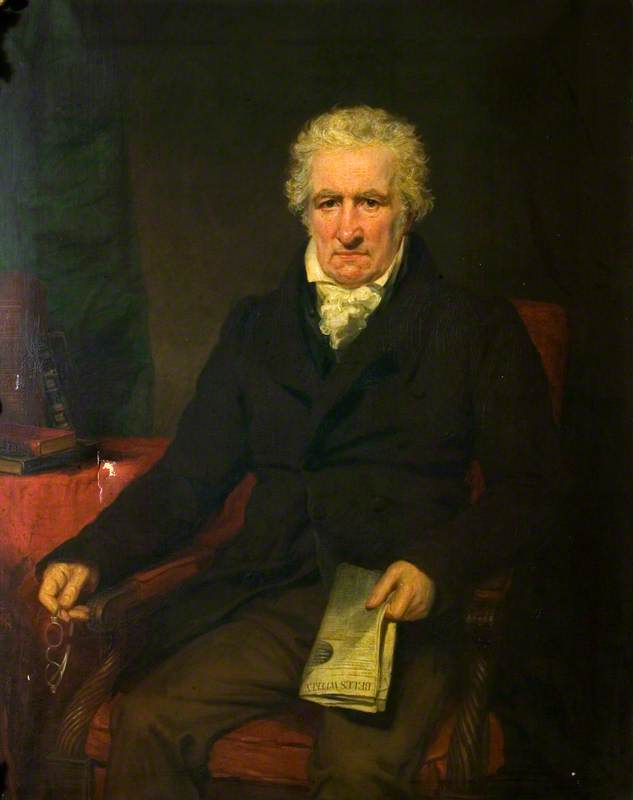
Portrait of John Bell by George Clint

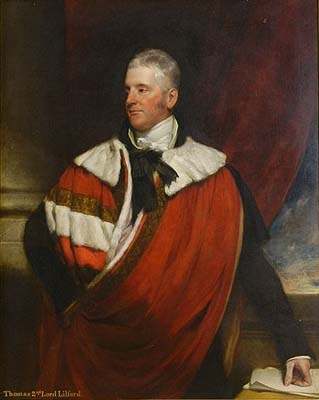
Portrait of Lord Lilford by Henry William Pickersgill

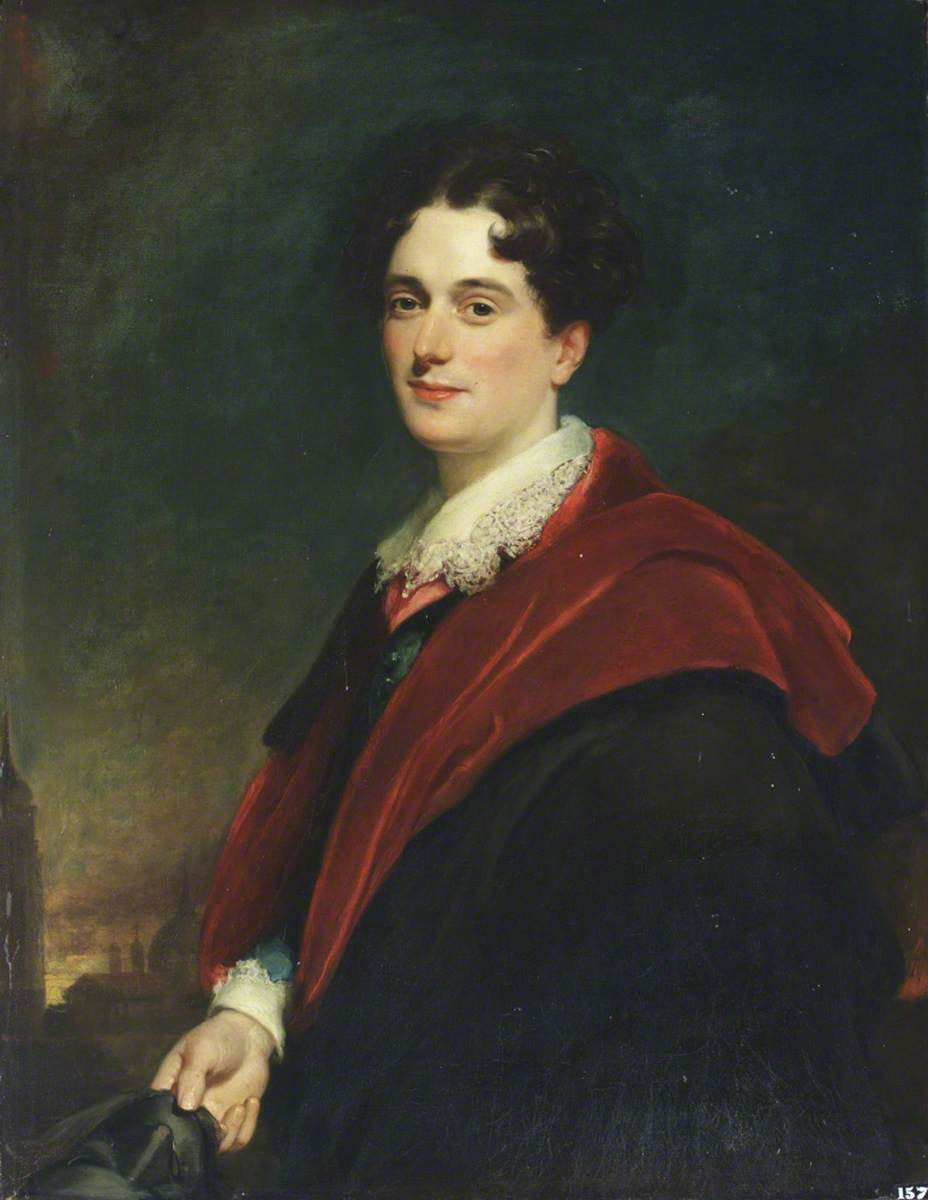
Portrait of Sir Jacob Astley by Henry William Pickersgill

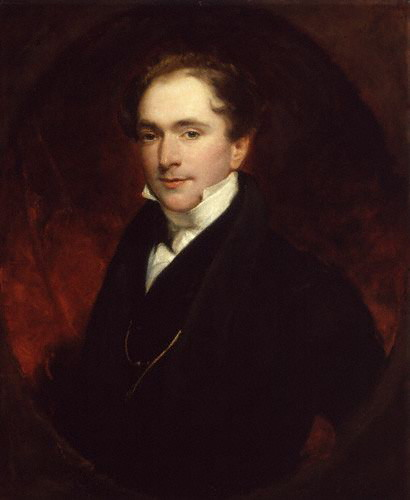
Portrait of John Poole by Henry William Pickersgill

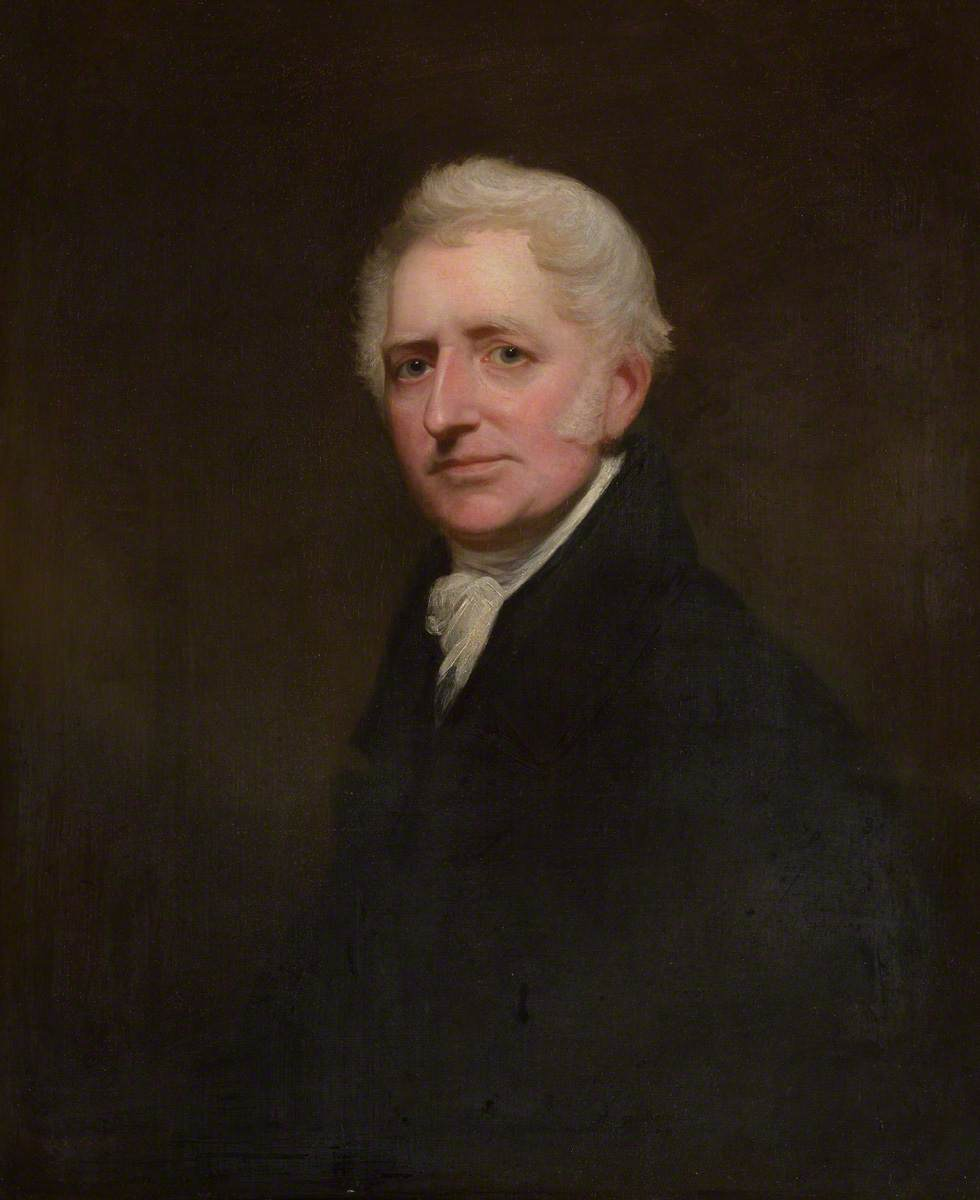
Portrait of Martin Davy by William Beechey

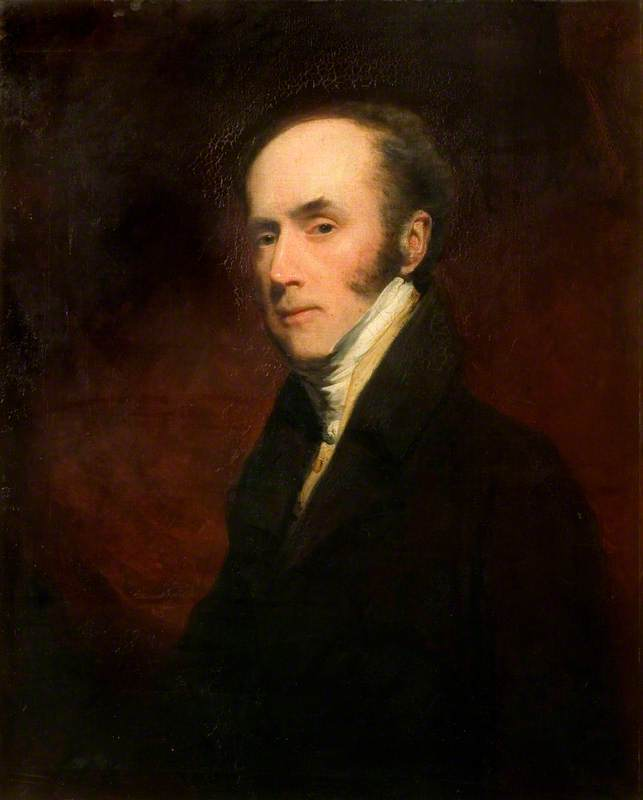
Portrait of Earl Grey by John Jackson

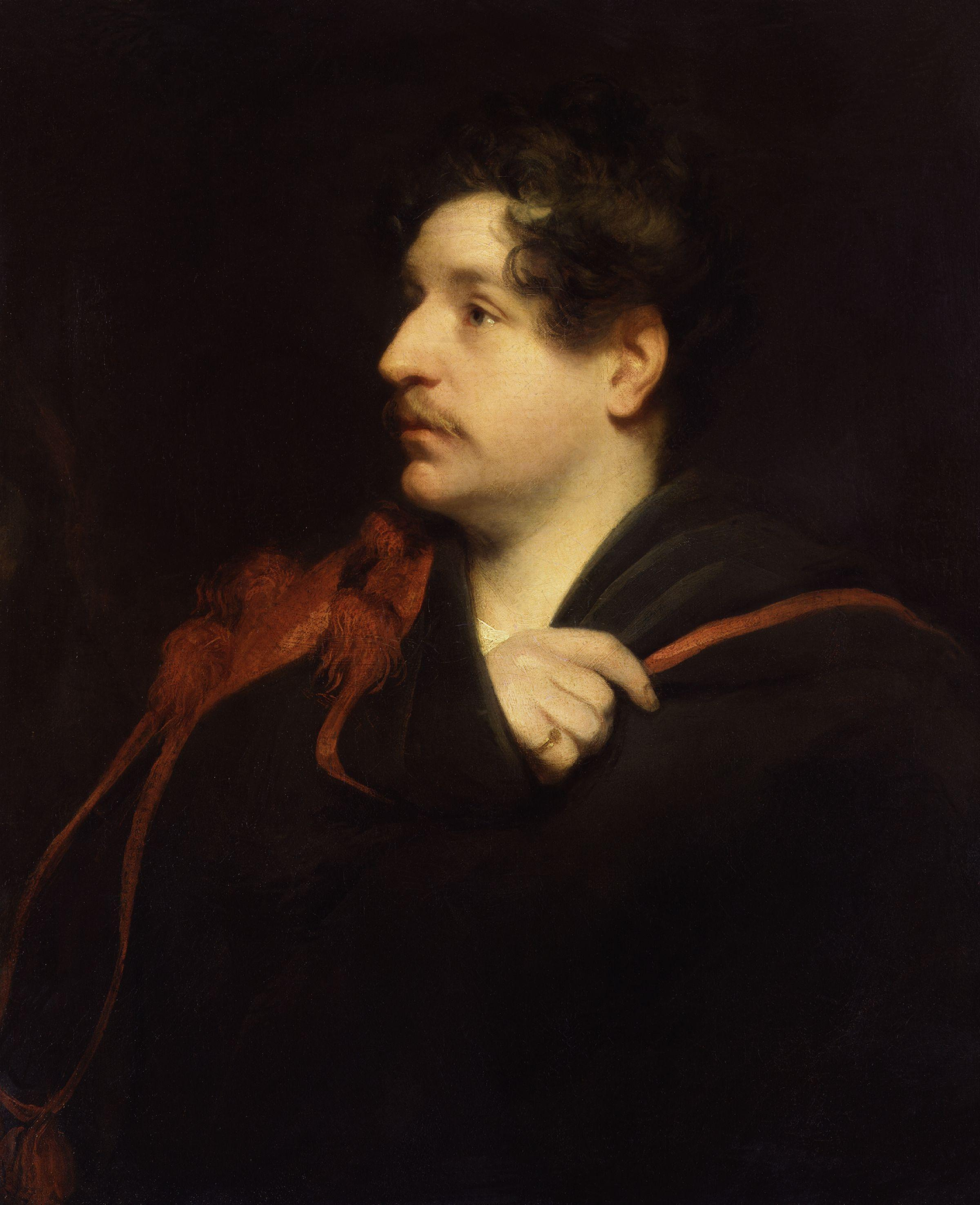
Portrait of Dixon Denham by Thomas Phillips

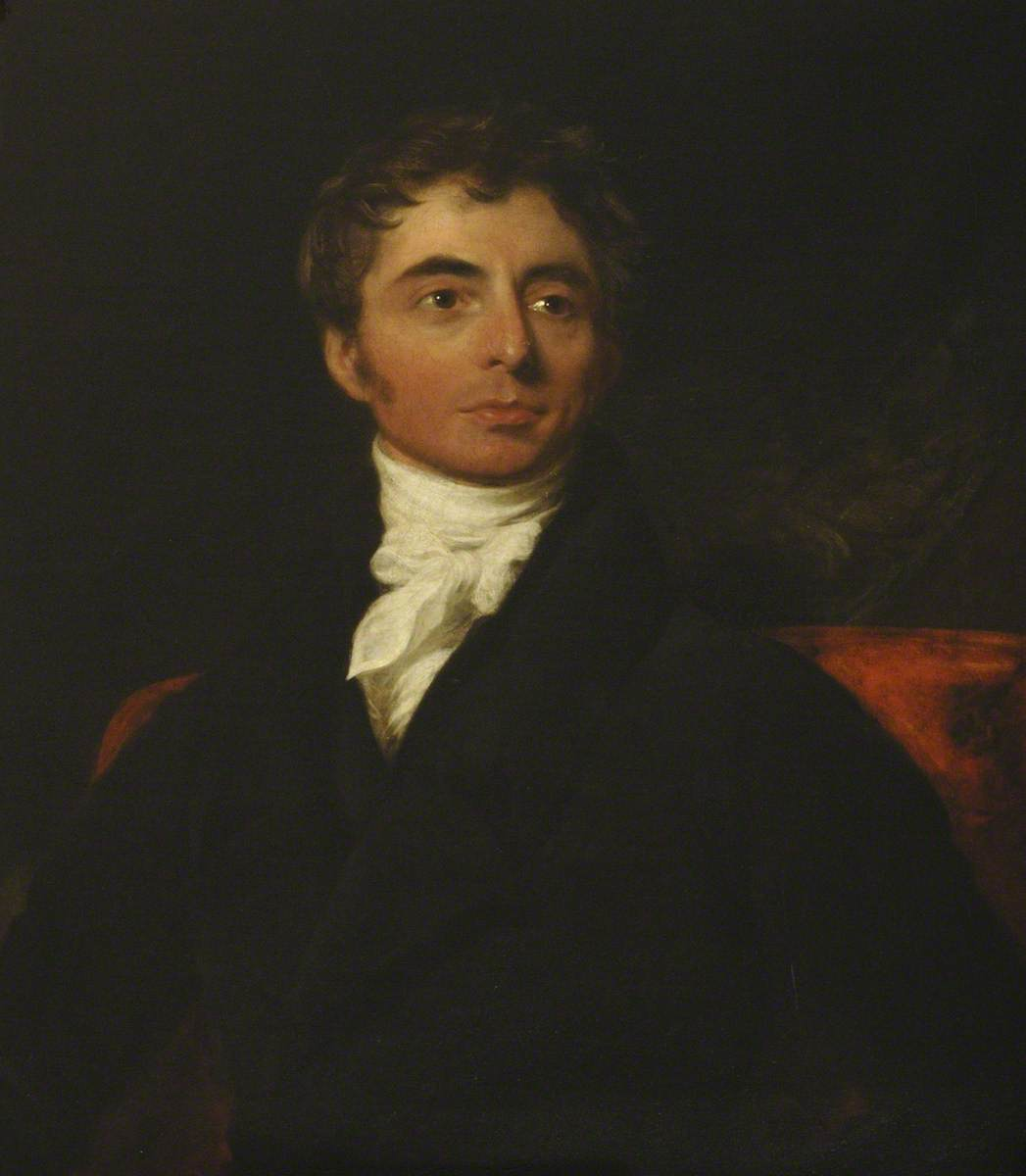
Portrait of Robert Southey by Samuel Lane

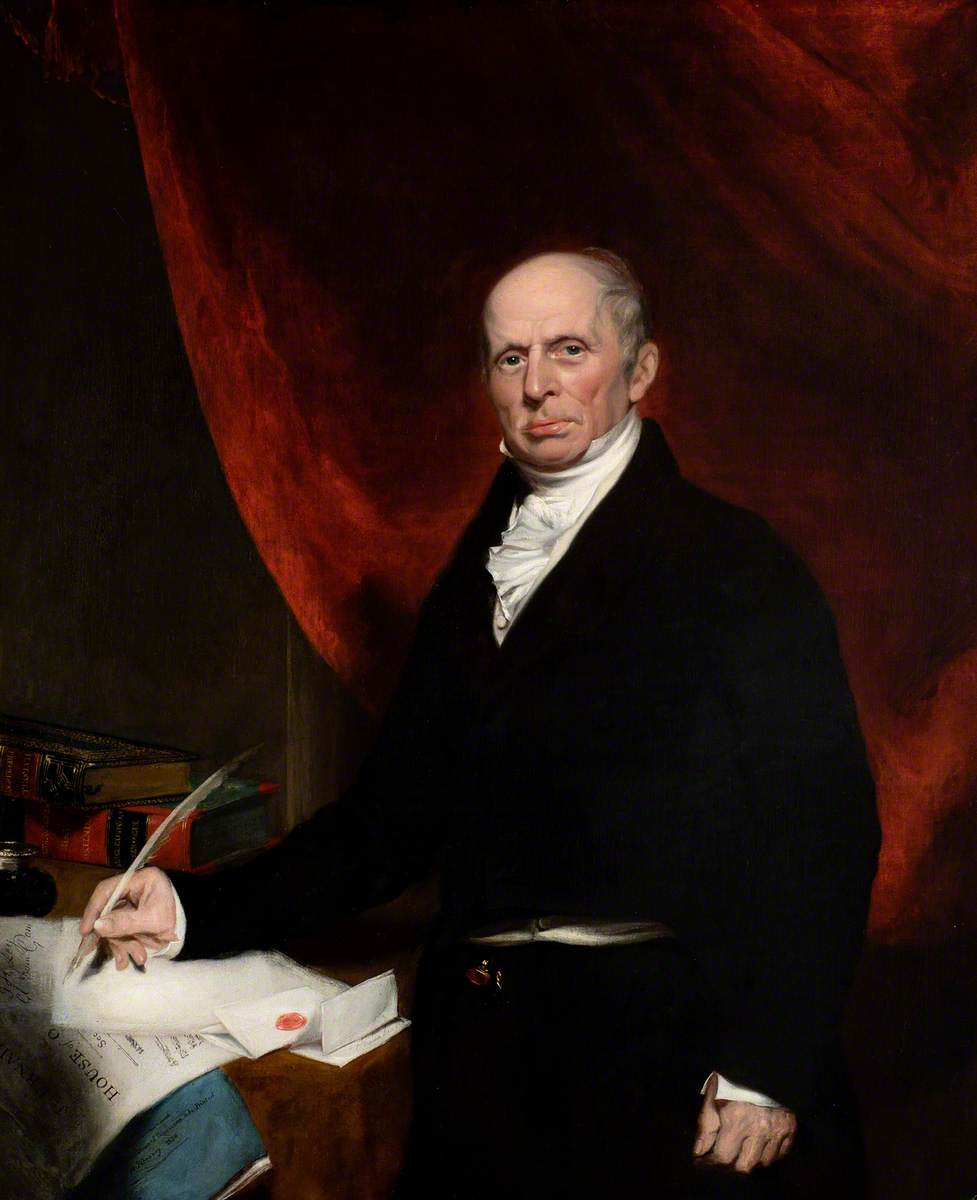
Portrait of Luke Hansard by Samuel Lane

== Bibliography ==
- Albinson, Cassandra, Funnell, Peter & Peltz, Lucy. Thomas Lawrence: Regency Power and Brilliance. Yale University Press, 2010.
- Bailey, Anthony. John Constable: A Kingdom of his Own. Random House, 2012.
- Hamilton, James. Constable: A Portrait. Hachette UK, 2022.
- Hamilton, James. Turner - A Life. Sceptre, 1998.
- Ormond, Richard. Sir Edwin Landseer. Philadelphia Museum of Art, 1981.
- Tromans, Nicholas. David Wilkie: The People's Painter. Edinburgh University Press, 2007.
