= Parham Mill =

Painting by John Constable

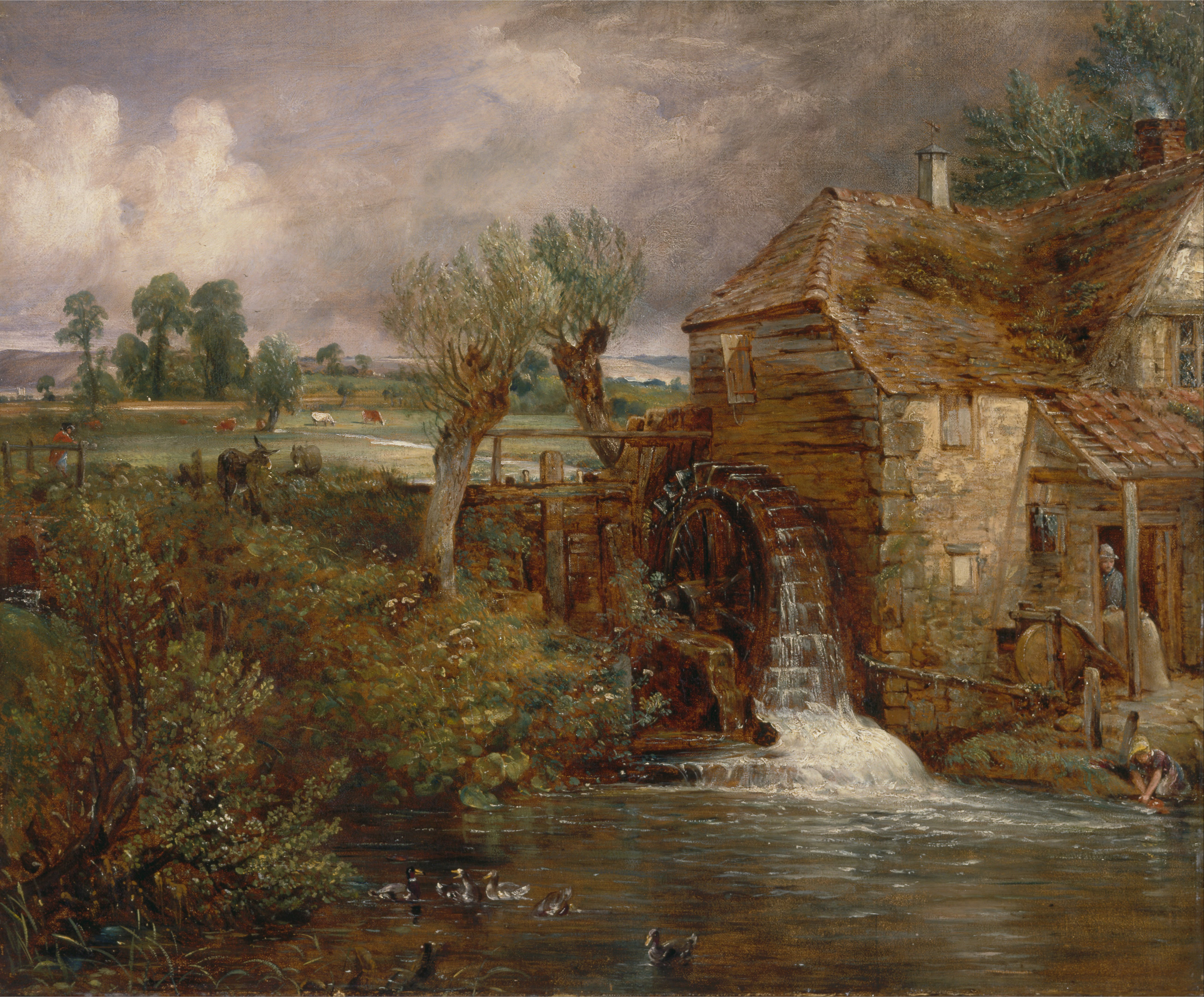
- Artist: John Constable
- Year: c. 1826
- Type: Oil on canvas
- Dimensions: 50.2 cm × 60.3 cm (19.76 in × 23.74 in)
- Location: Yale Center for British Art, New Haven, Connecticut

Parham Mill (or Parham Mill, Gillingham) is an 1826 landscape painting by the English artist John Constable. Constable completed the painting from earlier drawings after the mill burned down in 1825.

== Background ==
John Constable was born in 1776 in the Suffolk village of East Bergholt, to Golding Constable and his wife Ann. His father was a corn merchant, who owned Flatford Mill in the village and a mill in Dedham, Essex; Constable was expected to succeed his father in the business. After his education at schools in Lavenham and Dedham, Constable worked in his father's corn business, but his younger brother Abram eventually took over the running of the mills.

In 1799, the 19-year-old Constable persuaded his father to let him pursue a career in art, and Golding granted him a small allowance to allow him to train. He entered the Royal Academy Schools as a probationer. Following his marriage to Maria Bicknell In 1816, Constable lived in Bloomsbury in central London, before his family settled in Hampstead, where they lived permanently from 1827 onwards. The year The Cornfield was painted, Constable was 50 and had not yet been accepted as a full member of the Royal Academy of Arts, despite having sought election since the early 1820s.

== History ==
Parham Mill is an 1826 landscape painting by the English artist John Constable. It portrays a view of Perne’s Mill, a watermill in Gillingham, Dorset. In 1823 Constable was staying with his friend John Fisher, a nephew of the Bishop of Salisbury. Fisher suggested he should paint it. Constable was attracted to the mill which he called "wonderfull old & romantic".

The mill burned down in 1825, but Constable was able to complete the painting from his earlier drawings. It was exhibited at the Royal Academy's Summer Exhibition of 1826 at Somerset House. It is in the collection of the Yale Center for British Art.

== Sources ==
- Bailey, Anthony (2006). John Constable: A Kingdom of His Own. London: Vintage Books. ISBN 978-14481-3-771-8.
- Reynolds, Graham (1983). Constable's England. New York: Metropolitan Museum of Art. ISBN 978-08709-9-335-0.
