= 1611 in art =

List of years in art	(table)
- … 1601; 1602; 1603; 1604; 1605; 1606; 1607; 1608; 1609; 1610; 1611; 1612; 1613; 1614; 1615; 1616; 1617; 1618; 1619; 1620; 1621 …
- Art; Archaeology; Architecture; Literature; Music; Philosophy; Science; +...

Events from the year 1611 in art.

== Events ==
- The painter Agostino Tassi rapes his pupil Artemisia Gentileschi.

== Paintings ==
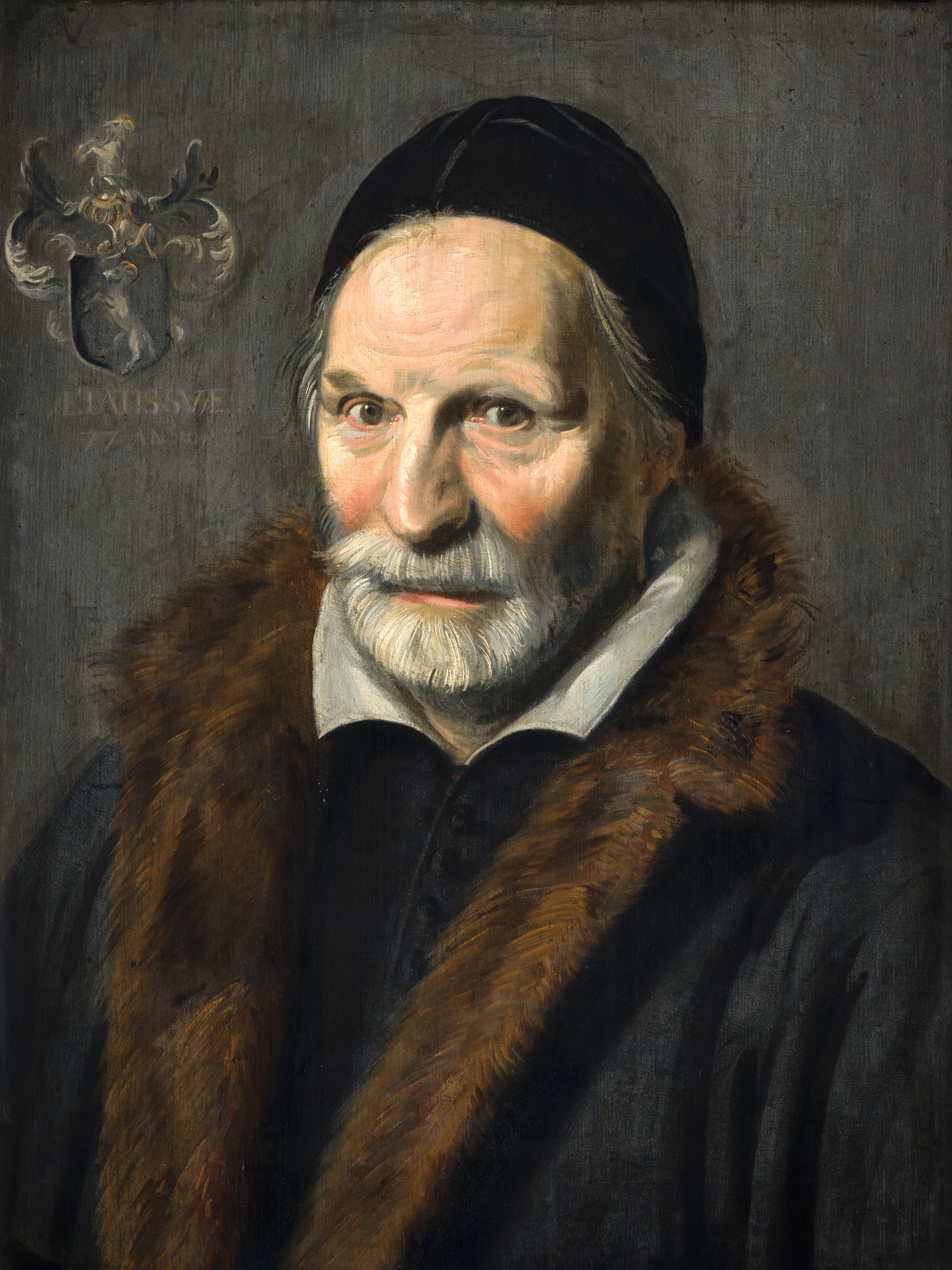
Hals – Jacobus Zaffius

- Marcus Gheeraerts the Younger - Frances Howard, Countess of Hertford
- Hendrik Goltzius - Mercury
- Frans Hals - Jacobus Zaffius (his first known painting)
- Peter Paul Rubens - The Elevation of the Cross (triptych, Cathedral of Our Lady (Antwerp), completed 1610–11)
- Joachim Wtewael - Perseus and Andromeda

== Births ==
- February 24 (bapt.) - William Dobson, English portrait painter (died 1646)
- March 15 - Jan Fyt, Flemish animal painter and etcher (died 1661)
- April 17 - Simone Pignoni, Italian painter of both licentious then later pious works (died 1698)
- August 4 - Jan van den Hoecke, Antwerp painter and draftsman (died 1651)
- date unknown
  - Nicolas Baudesson, French flower painter (died 1680)
  - Giovanni Battista Bolognini, Italian painter and engraver (died 1668)
  - Charles Alphonse du Fresnoy, painter (died 1665)
  - Pietro Testa, Italian High Baroque artist (died 1650)
  - Giovanni Francesco Cassana, Italian portrait painter (died 1691)
  - Baldassare Franceschini, late Italian Baroque painter of frescoes (died 1689)
  - Muyan, Chinese Chan monk and calligrapher (died 1684)
  - Diego Quispe Tito, Peruvian painter, leader of the Cuzco School of painting (died 1681)
  - Francesco Guarino, Italian painter active mainly in the mountainous area east of Naples called Irpinia (died 1651/1654)
  - Francesco Quaini, Italian painter of quadratura (died 1680)
- probable
  - Antonio de Pereda, Spanish painter (died 1678)
  - Sebastiano Mazzoni, Italian who painted with unresolved dynamism and from awkward perspectives (died 1678)
  - Willem van de Velde the Elder, Dutch painter (died 1693)
  - Fra Bonaventura Bisi, Italian painter (died 1662)
- (born 1611/1612) - Hendrick Cornelisz. van Vliet – Dutch painter (died 1675)

== Deaths ==
- January - Anton Möller, German painter (born 1563)
- August - Bartholomeus Spranger, Flemish Northern Mannerist painter, draughtsman, and etcher (born 1546)
- date unknown
  - Luigi Benfatto, Italian painter, nephew of Paolo Veronese (born 1551)
  - Sun Kehong, Chinese landscape painter, calligrapher, and poet (born 1533)
  - Camillo Mariani, Italian sculptor of the early Baroque (born 1565)
  - Barthélemy Prieur, French sculptor (born 1536)
  - Sampson Strong, Dutch-born portrait painter (born 1550)
  - Nicolas van Houy, Dutch Golden Age painter (born 1550)
  - Marco Vecellio, Italian painter, nephew of Titian (born 1545)
- probable
  - Ludovico Buti, Italian painter active mostly in Florence (born 1560)
  - Jan Soens, Dutch painter from 's-Hertogenbosch (born 1547)
