= 1678 in art =

Events from the year 1678 in art.

== Events ==
- Louis Chéron wins the Prix de Rome for a second time.

== Works ==
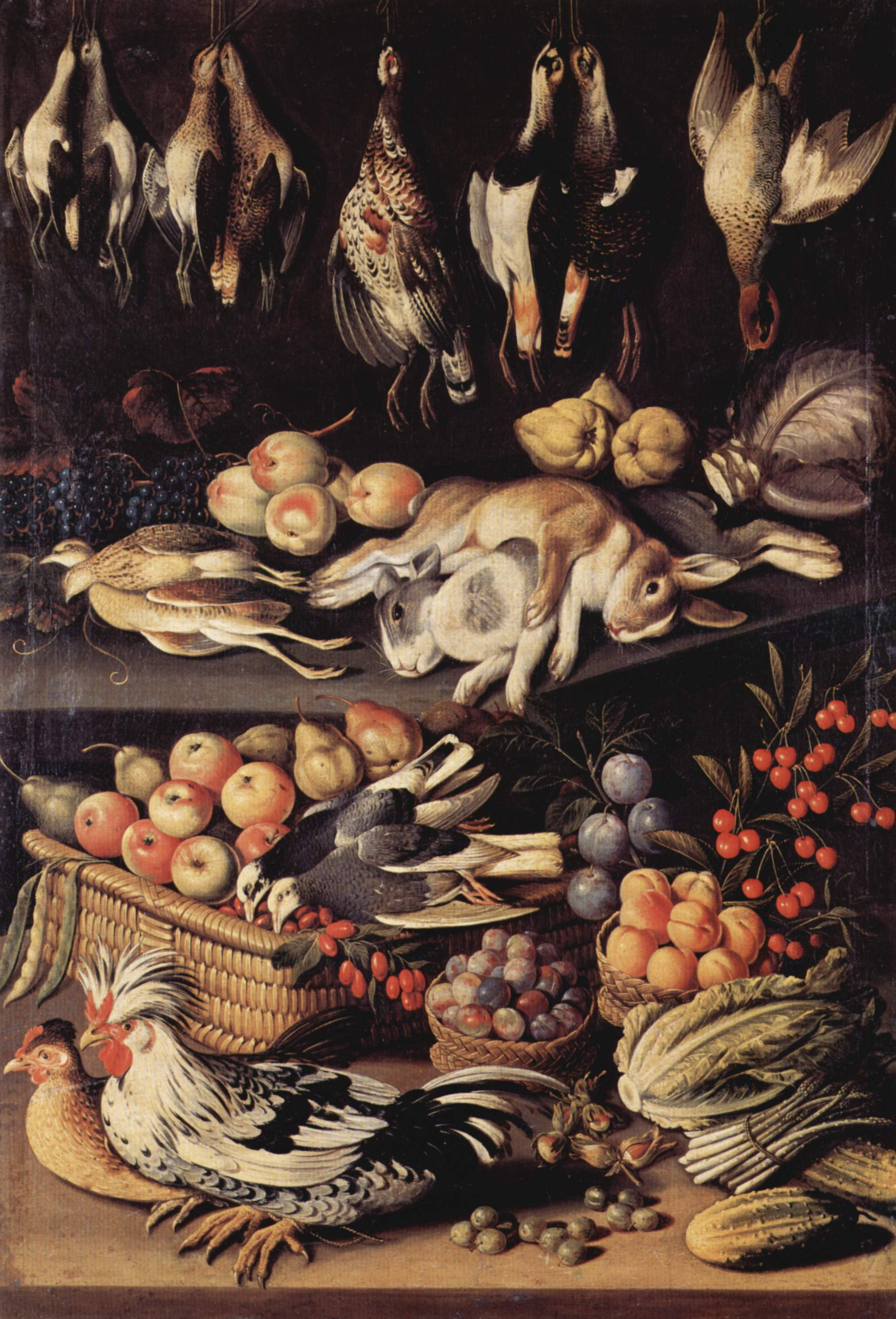
Kauw – Still Life, Museum of Fine Arts Berne

- Gianlorenzo Bernini - the Tomb of Pope Alexander VII (completed during this year)
- Albrecht Kauw - Still Life
- Murillo - The Immaculate Conception and The Christ Child Distributing Bread to Pilgrims
- Ary de Vois - The scholar Adriaan van Beverland with a prostitute

== Births ==
- June 3 - Domenico Antonio Vaccaro, Italian painter, sculptor and architect (died 1745)
- date unknown
  - Giovanni Francesco Bagnoli, Italian painter of still-life paintings (died 1713)
  - Antonio Baroni, Italian painter active in Verona (died 1746)
  - Carlo Bolognini, Italian painter of quadratura (died 1704)
  - François Coudray, French sculptor (died 1727)
  - Tommaso Dossi, Italian painter from Verona (died 1730)
  - Alexis Grimou, French painter (died 1733)
  - Bernardo Schiaffino, Italian sculptor (died 1725)
  - Alonso Miguel de Tovar, Spanish painter (died 1758)

== Deaths ==
- January 29 - Giulio Carpioni, Italian painter and etcher (born 1613)
- January 20 - Antonio de Pereda, Spanish painter (born 1611)
- April 13 - Pieter van Anraedt, Dutch Golden Age painter of history scenes (born 1635)
- April 22 - Sebastiano Mazzoni, Italian who painted with unresolved dynamism and from awkward perspectives (born 1611)
- June
  - Pieter Jansz van Asch, Dutch painter (born 1603)
  - Otto Marseus van Schrieck, Dutch painter (born 1619)
- July 26 - Orsola Maddalena Caccia, Italian woman painter (b. unknown)
- September 1 - Jan Brueghel the Younger, Flemish painter (born 1601)
- September 8 - Pietro della Vecchia, Italian painter of grotesque paintings and portraitures (born 1603)
- October - Caesar van Everdingen, Dutch portrait painter (born 1616/1617)
- October 12 - Pieter Codde, Dutch painter of genre works (born 1599)
- October 18 - Jacob Jordaens, Flemish painter (born 1593)
- October 19 - Samuel Dirksz van Hoogstraten, Dutch painter (born 1627)
- November 20 - Karel Dujardin, Dutch animal and landscape painter (born 1626)
- December 9 - Jürgen Ovens, German painter (born 1623)
- date unknown
  - Dominique Barrière, French painter and engraver (born 1622)
  - Marco Boschini, Italian painter in Venice (born 1613)
  - Pierre Daret, French portrait painter and engraver (born 1604)
  - Bernabé de Ayala, Spanish historical painter (born 1600)
  - Domenico de Benedettis, Italian painter (born 1610)
  - Vicente Salvador Gómez, Spanish Baroque painter (born 1637)
  - Giulio Cesare Milani, Italian painter (born 1621)
  - Giacomo Torelli, Italian set designer and engraver (born 1608)
  - Giovanni Battista Falda, Italian engraver especially of contemporary and antique structures in Rome (born 1640)
  - Matthew Snelling, English miniature painter (born 1621)
  - Pieter Hermansz Verelst, Dutch Golden Age genre art painter (born 1618)
- probable
  - Domenico Ambrogi, Italian painter from Bologna (born 1600)
  - Cornelis de Neve, Flemish portrait painter (born unknown)
