= 1550 in art =

List of years in art	(table)
- … 1540; 1541; 1542; 1543; 1544; 1545; 1546; 1547; 1548; 1549; 1550; 1551; 1552; 1553; 1554; 1555; 1556; 1557; 1558; 1559; 1560 …
- Art; Archaeology; Architecture; Literature; Music; Philosophy; Science; +...

Events from the year 1550 in art.

== Events ==
- Antonis Mor is commissioned by Mary of Hungary to travel around Portugal and paint portraits of the Portuguese branch of her family.
- Giorgio Vasari publishes Le Vite de' più eccellenti pittori, scultori, ed architettori (The Lives of the Most Eminent Painters, Sculptors, and Architects) in Florence.

== Paintings ==
Floris – Banquet of the Gods, Royal Museum of Fine Arts, Antwerp

- Sofonisba Anguissola – Bernardino Campi Painting Sofonisba Anguissola
- Bronzino - PortraIt of a Young Man (possibly Pierino da Vinci)
- Lucas Cranach the Elder – Self-portrait at 77
- Frans Floris – Banquet of the Gods
- Maarten van Heemskerck – Adam and Eve/Gideon and the Fleece
- Dirck Jacobsz. – Jacob Cornelisz. van Oostsanen Painting a Portrait of His Wife
- Jan Mandijn – The Temptation of St. Anthony
- Francesco de' Rossi – Portrait of a Young Man
- Titian – Venus and Musician (Venus with an Organist and a Dog, Museo del Prado)

== Births ==
- April 18 - Alessandro Pieroni, Italian mannerist painter and architect (died 1607)
- date unknown
  - Cristoforo Augusta, Italian painter, pupil of Giovanni Battista Trotti (died 1600)
  - Matthijs Bril, landscape painter of frescoes who worked in Rome (died 1583)
  - Aert Pietersz, Dutch painter (died 1612)
  - Jan Sadeler I, Flemish engraver of the Sadeler family (died 1600)
- probable
  - Piermaria Bagnadore, Italian painter and architect of the late-Renaissance period (died 1627)
  - Pier Angelo Basili, Italian painter born in Gubbio (died 1604)
  - Pieter Bast, Dutch cartographer, engraver and draftsman (died 1605)
  - Giovanni Paolo Cavagna, Italian painter, active mainly in Bergamo (died 1627)
  - Giovanni Battista Cremonini, Italian painter of primarily frescoes (died 1610)
  - Pedro de Bolduque, Spanish sculptor of Flemish origin (died 1595)
  - Wendel Dietterlin, German painter/architect, author of a treatise on the five orders entitled Architectura (1598) filled with Mannerist ornament (died 1599)
  - 1548/1550: Palma il Giovane, Italian Mannerist painter from Venice (died 1628)
  - Marcin Kober, Polish court painter to King Stefan Batory (died 1598)
  - Giovanni Paolo Lolmo, Italian painter (died 1593)
  - Sampson Strong, Dutch-born portrait painter (died 1611)
  - Nicolas van Houy, Dutch Golden Age painter (died 1611)
  - Hendrik van Steenwijk I, Dutch painter, earliest-known painter of architectural interiors (died 1603)
  - Giovanni Vasanzio, Dutch-born architect, garden designer and engraver (died 1621)
  - (born 1550/1551) Scarsellino, Italian painter, of the School of Ferrara (died 1620)
  - Hans van Steenwinckel the Elder, Flemish/Danish sculptor and architect (died 1601)
  - Đorđe Mitrofanović, Serbian portraitist, icon painter and muralist (died 1630)

== Deaths ==
- September - Giovanni Maria Francesco Rondani, Italian painter of the Parmesan school (born 1490)
- September 7 - Niccolò Tribolo, Italian Mannerist artist (born 1500)
- 22 November - Sebald Beham, German printmaker, engraver, designer of woodcuts, painter and miniaturist (born 1500)
- October 11 - Georg Pencz, German engraver, painter and printmaker (born 1500)
- December 6 - Pieter Coecke van Aelst, Flemish artist of paintings and tapestries (born 1502)
- date unknown
  - Antonio da Trento, Italian artist especially of woodcuts (born 1508)
  - Antonio Fantuzzi, Italian etcher (born 1510)
  - Gregório Lopes, Renaissance painter from Portugal (born 1490)
  - Girolamo Marchesi, Italian painter (born 1471)
- probable - Innocenzo di Pietro Francucci da Imola, Italian painter and draftsman (died 1494)
