= 1617 in art =

List of years in art	(table)
- … 1607; 1608; 1609; 1610; 1611; 1612; 1613; 1614; 1615; 1616; 1617; 1618; 1619; 1620; 1621; 1622; 1623; 1624; 1625; 1626; 1627 …
- Art; Archaeology; Architecture; Literature; Music; Philosophy; Science; +...

Events from the year 1617 in art.

== Events ==
- Kanō Tan'yū becomes an official artist of the Tokugawa shogunate.
- Lucas Vorsterman joins the workshop of Peter Paul Rubens, soon becoming Rubens's primary engraver.

== Works ==
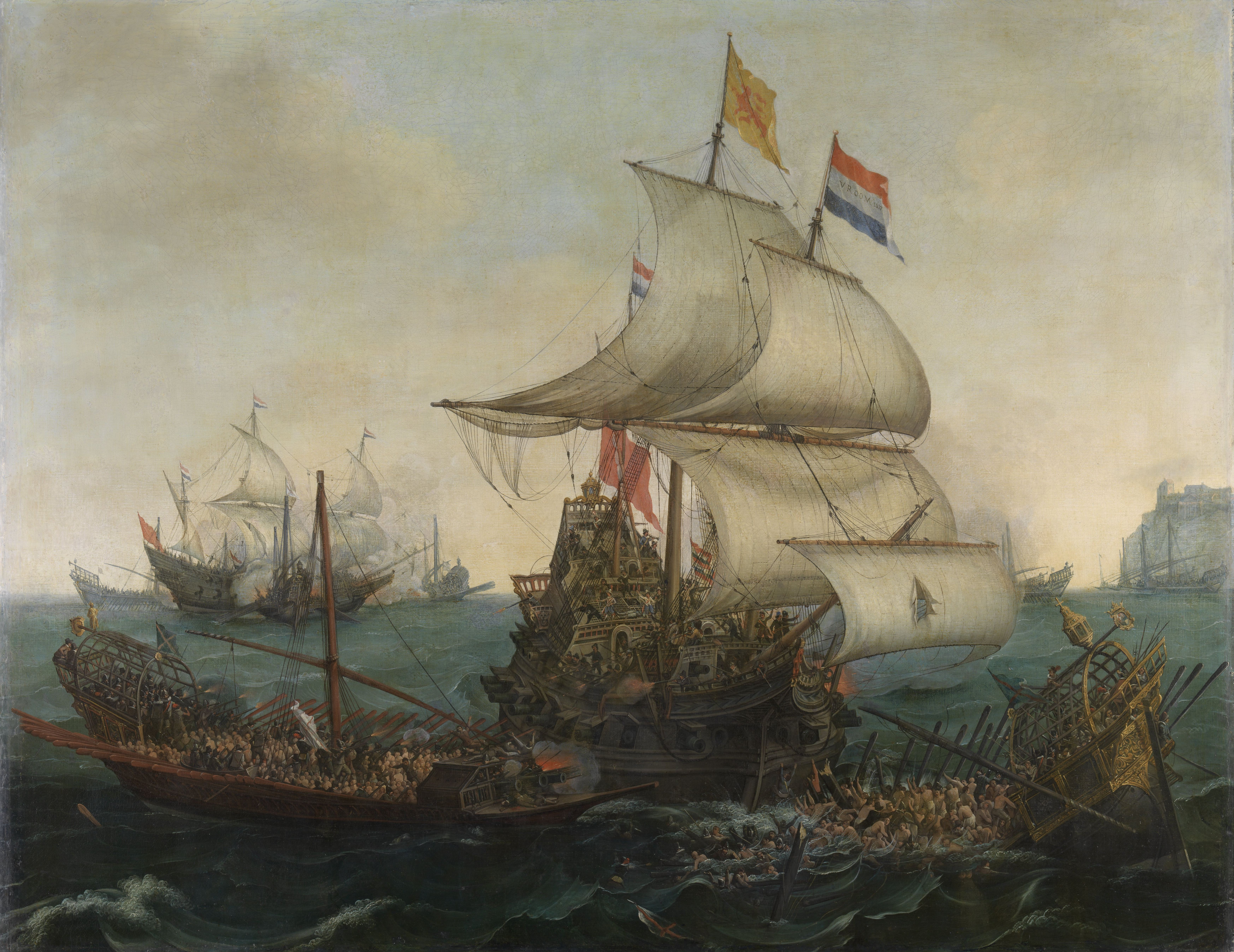
Vroom – Dutch Ships Ramming Spanish Galleys off the Flemish Coast in October 1602

- Abu al-Hasan - Shah Jahangir
- Gian Lorenzo Bernini - marble sculptures
  - The Martyrdom of Saint Lawrence (probable date)
  - with Pietro Bernini - Boy with a Dragon
- Frans Hals - Shrovetide Revellers
- Peter Paul Rubens
  - Adoration of the Magi
  - Mars and Rhea Silvia (approximate date)
- Nicholas Stone - floor tomb of Sir William Curle in St Etheldreda's church, Old Hatfield, England
- Diego Velázquez - The Lunch
- Hendrick Cornelisz Vroom - Dutch Ships Ramming Spanish Galleys off the Flemish Coast in October 1602

== Births ==
- January 19 – Lucas Faydherbe, Dutch sculptor and architect (died 1697)
- January 22 – Ludovicus Neefs, Flemish painter (died 1649)
- February 5 – Jan Thomas van Ieperen, Flemish painter and engraver (died 1673)
- May – John Michael Wright, English baroque portrait painter (died 1694)
- August 10 (bapt.) – Ambrosius Brueghel, Flemish painter (died 1675)
- October 17 – Dionisio Lazzari, Italian sculptor and architect (died 1689)
- November 19 – Eustache Le Sueur, co-founder of the French Academy of painting (died 1655)
- November 21 – Tosa Mitsuoki, Japanese painter (died 1691)
- December – Gerard ter Borch, Dutch subject painter (died 1681)
- December 7 – Evaristo Baschenis, Italian Baroque painter primarily of still lifes (died 1677)
- December 31 – Bartolomé Esteban Murillo, Spanish painter best known for his religious works (died 1682)
- date unknown
  - Emanuel de Witte, Dutch perspective painter (died 1692)
  - Pellegrino Piola, Italian painter (died 1640)
  - Paolo Porpora, Italian painter of floral still lifes (died 1670)
  - Carlo Sacchi, Italian painter and engraver (died 1706)

== Deaths ==
- January 1 – Hendrik Goltzius, Dutch printmaker, draughtsman and painter (born 1588)
- September – Louis Finson - Flemish painter of the Dutch Golden Age (born 1580)
- October 2 – Isaac Oliver, French-born English portrait miniature painter (born 1565)
- date unknown
  - Fabrizio Castello, Italian painter of Genoese origin settled in Spain (born 1562)
  - Hans Ruprecht Hoffmann, German sculptor (born c.1545)
  - Giovanni Battista Vernici, Italian painter (born unknown)
  - Andrea Vicentino, Italian Mannerist painter (born 1542)
