= 1613 in art =

List of years in art	(table)
- … 1603; 1604; 1605; 1606; 1607; 1608; 1609; 1610; 1611; 1612; 1613; 1614; 1615; 1616; 1617; 1618; 1619; 1620; 1621; 1622; 1623 …
- Art; Archaeology; Architecture; Literature; Music; Philosophy; Science; +...

Events from the year 1613 in art.

== Events ==
- April 27 – Inigo Jones is appointed Surveyor of the King's Works in England.
- August 11 – Cesare Corte, after a period imprisoned by the Roman Inquisition, confesses and undergoes a public abjuration of his heretical beliefs. He dies in prison a few weeks later.

== Paintings ==
Brueghel – The Entry of the Animals Into Noah's Ark

- Cristofano Allori – Judith with the Head of Holofernes (Palazzo Pitti, Florence)
- Jan Brueghel the Elder – The Entry of the Animals Into Noah's Ark
- Lavinia Fontana – Minerva Dressing
- Hendrik Goltzius – Adam and Eve

== Births ==
- February 24 – Mattia Preti, Italian Baroque artist who worked in Italy and Malta (died 1699)
- March 12 – André Le Nôtre, landscape architect (died 1700)
- April 7 – Gerrit Dou (or Gerard Dow), Dutch painter (died 1675), pupil of Rembrandt
- October 12 – Jacques d'Arthois, Flemish Baroque painter who specialized in landscapes (died 1686)
- date unknown
  - Pier Martire Armani, Italian painter (died 1669)
  - Gian Pietro Bellori, Italian painter, antiquarian and biographer of artists (died 1696)
  - Marco Boschini, Italian painter of the early-Baroque period in Venice (died 1678)
  - Giovanni Maria Bottala, Italian painter (died 1644)
  - Conrad Buno, German copperplate engraver, cartographer and publisher (died 1671)
  - Giulio Carpioni, Italian painter and etcher of the early Baroque era (died 1678)
  - Dirck Cornelis de Hooch, Dutch portrait painter (died 1651)
  - Pieter de Bailliu, Flemish engraver (died unknown)
  - Aniella di Beltrano, Italian painter (died 1649)
  - Cornelis Mahu, Flemish painter (died 1689)
  - Giovanni Paolo Oderico, Italian painter mainly active in Genoa (died 1657)
  - Antonio Travi, deaf Italian landscape painter (died 1668)
  - Giulio Trogli, Italian painter nicknamed il Paradosso ("the Paradox") (died 1685)
  - Bartholomeus van der Helst, Dutch portrait painter (died 1670)
  - Jacob van der Roer van Dordrecht, Dutch Golden Age portrait painter (died 1691)

== Deaths ==
- February 27 – Pietro Facchetti, Italian painter primarily of portraits (born 1539)
- March 13 – Giovanni Battista Caccini, Italian sculptor (born 1556)
- March 23 – Jerónimo de Ayanz y Beaumont, Spanish soldier, painter, musician and inventor (born 1553)
- March 25 – Taddeo Carlone, Swiss-Italian sculptor and architect (date of birth unknown)
- July – Giovan Battista Cavagna, architect, engineer and painter
- June 18 – Cigoli, Italian painter and architect of the late Mannerist period (born 1559)
- July 19 – Nicolaus van Aelst, Flemish engraver and painter (born 1526)
- date unknown
  - Durante Alberti, Italian painter, member of family of artists (born 1538)
  - Cesare Corte, Italian painter active mainly in his natal city of Genoa (born 1554)
  - Ercole dell'Abate, Italian painter (born 1563)
  - Giovanni Battista da Ponte, Italian painter active in Venice and his native Bassano del Grappa (born 1533)
  - Simone de Magistris, Italian painter and sculptor (born 1555)
  - Ventura Salimbeni, Italian Mannerist painter and printmaker (born 1568)
