= Bolognini =

Bolognini is an Italian surname. Notable people with the surname include:

- Antonio Bolognini (died 1461), Roman Catholic prelate
- Carlo Bolognini (1678–1704), Italian painter of the Baroque
- Ennio Bolognini (1893–1979), Argentine-born American cellist, guitarist and composer
- Eugenia Attendolo Bolognini (1837–1914), Italian noblewoman and philanthropist
- Giacomo Bolognini (1664–1734), Italian painter
- Giovanni Battista Bolognini (1611–1688), Italian painter and engraver
- Maurizio Bolognini (born 1952), Italian post-conceptual artist
- Mauro Bolognini (1922–2001), Italian film director
- Nepomuceno Bolognini (1823–1900), officer of Garibaldi
