= 1681 in art =

Events from the year 1681 in art.

== Works ==
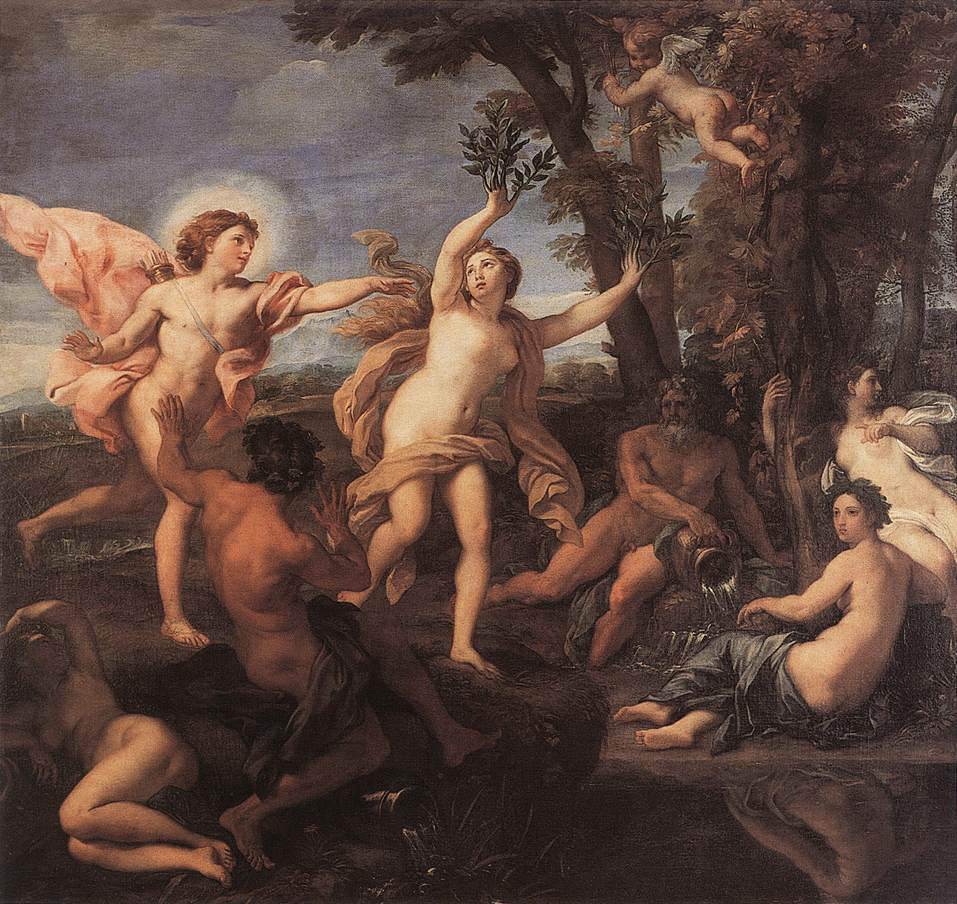
Maratta – Apollo Chasing Daphne, Royal Museums of Fine Arts of Belgium

- Caius Gabriel Cibber - Statue of Charles II, Soho Square
- Jean Cotelle - Marriage at Cana (for Notre Dame de Paris)
- Claude Lorrain - Landscape with Christ appearing to Mary Magdalen
- Carlo Maratta - Apollo Chasing Daphne

== Births ==
- March 30 - Pieter Snyers, Flemish art collector, painter, draughtsman, engraver (died 1752)
- April 9 – Nicolas Edelinck, French-born engraver, son of Gerard Edelinck (died 1767)
- April 18 – Girolamo Donnini, Italian painter of the Baroque period (died 1743)
- May 23 – Jacopo Zoboli, Italian etcher and painter of altarpieces and portraits (died 1767)
- December 14 – Giuseppe Valentini, Italian violinist, painter, poet, and composer (died 1753)
- date unknown
  - Francesco Conti, Italian Venetian painter (died 1760)
  - Johann Jakob Frey the Elder, Swiss engraver (died 1752)
  - Peter Monamy, English marine painter (died 1749)
  - Girolamo Odam, Italian painter, pastel portraitist and landscape artist, as well as wood engraver (died 1718)

== Deaths ==
- February 11 – Gerard Soest, Dutch painter, father of Gerard ter Borch (born 1600)
- March 12
  - Giuseppe Bonati, Italian painter of the Baroque period, active in Rome and Ferrara (born 1635)
  - Frans van Mieris, Sr., Dutch genre and portrait painter (born 1635)
- April 12 – Pietro Paolini, Italian painter of still lifes and cabinet pictures (born 1603)
- April 23 - Justus Sustermans, Flemish painter in the Baroque style (born 1597)
- June 1 – Cornelis Saftleven, Dutch painter of the Baroque period (born 1607)
- November 11 - Jacob Marrel, Dutch still-life painter (born 1613)
- December 8 – Gerard ter Borch, Dutch subject painter (born 1617)
- December 10 - Gaspard Marsy, French sculptor (born 1624)
- date unknown
  - Giovanni Domenico Cerrini, Italian painter from the Bolognese School (born 1609)
  - Pierfrancesco Cittadini, Italian painter of still life (born 1616)
  - Giacinto Gimignani, Italian painter, active mainly in Rome, during the Baroque period (born 1606)
  - Albrecht Kauw, Swiss still-life painter, cartographer and a painter of vedute (born 1621)
  - Juan Rizi, Spanish painter (born 1600)
  - Diego Quispe Tito, Peruvian painter, leader of the Cuzco School of painting (born 1611)
