= ODAM =

ODAM or Odam may refer to:

- ODAM (gene)
- Organisation of Development, Action and Maintenance, Indian NGO
- International Strategic Research Organization, Turkish think-tank

== People ==
- Girolamo Odam (1681–after 1718), Italian painter
- Dorothy Tyler-Odam (1920–2014), British athlete
- John Odam (born 1943), American lawyer and politician
- Norman Carl Odam (born 1947), American performer known as the Legendary Stardust Cowboy

== See also ==
- Odams
