= 1713 in art =

Events from the year 1713 in art.

== Events ==
- Construction of Hogarth's House in London begins.

== Paintings ==
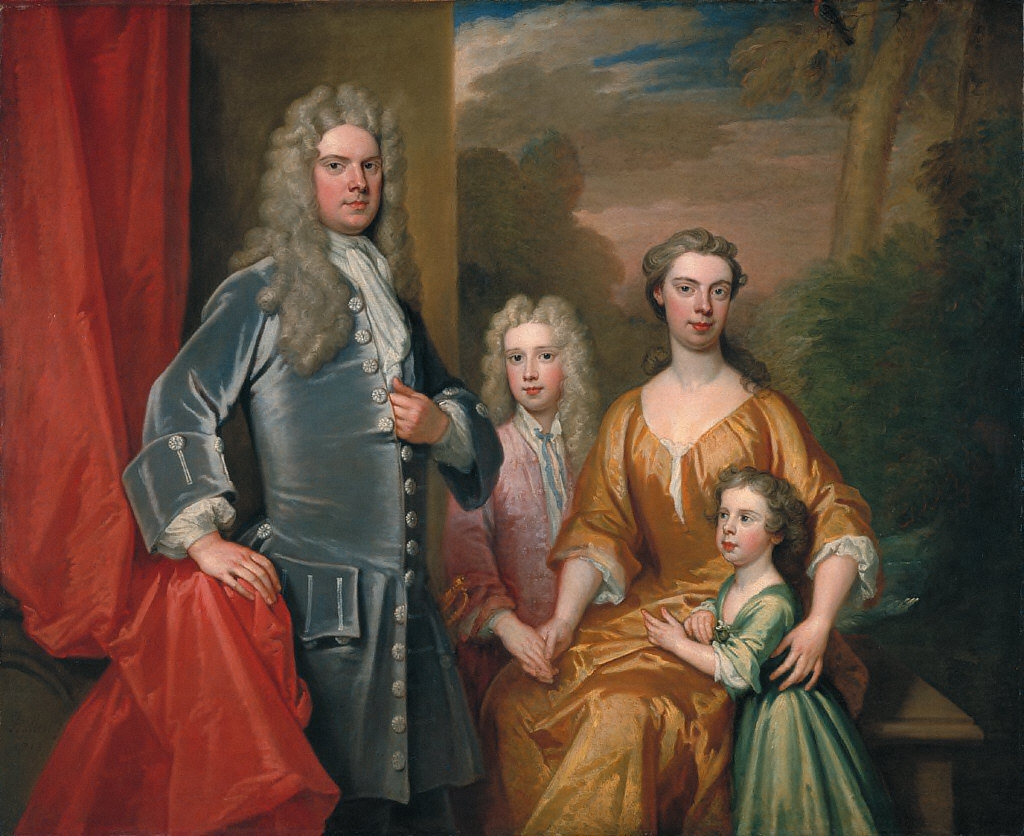
Kneller – James Brydges and his family

- Sir Godfrey Kneller – James Brydges and his family
- Sebastiano Ricci – Selene and Endymion

== Births ==
- April 21 – Anna Maria Hilfeling, Swedish miniaturist (died 1783)
- May 4 – Stefano Maria Legnani, Italian painter, active mainly in Milan (born 1661)
- July 10 - Anna Rosina de Gasc, German portrait painter (died 1783)
- August 27 – Anton August Beck, German engraver (died 1787)
- October 13 – Allan Ramsay, Scottish portrait painter (died 1784)
- October 30 – Giuseppe Antonio Landi, Italian neoclassical architect and painter of quadratura (died 1791)
- date unknown
  - Johannes de Bosch, Dutch painter, engraver and draughtsman (died 1785)
  - Kang Sehwang, Korean politician, painter, calligrapher and art critic of the mid Joseon period (died 1791)

== Deaths ==
- June 11 – Felix Meyer, Swiss painter and engraver (born 1653)
- October 15 – Johann Michael Feuchtmayer the Elder, German painter and copper engraver (born 1666)
- December 15 – Carlo Maratta, Italian painter (born 1625)
- date unknown
  - Giovanni Francesco Bagnoli, Italian painter of still-life (born 1678)
  - Jean François Baudesson, French painter of flowers and fruit (born 1640)
  - Henry Gibbs, English oil painter (born 1630/1631)
  - Jean-Baptiste Théodon, French sculptor (born 1645)
