= 1691 in art =

Events from the year 1691 in art.

== Events ==
- William Fermor, 1st Baron Leominster, buys the Metrological Relief (now on display at the Ashmolean Museum in Oxford).

== Works ==
=== Paintings ===
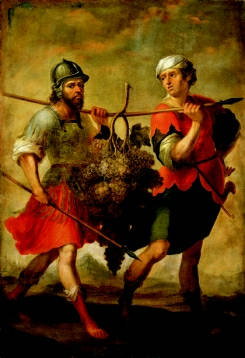
de Arteaga – The Cluster of the Land of Promise

- Matias de Arteaga – The Cluster of the Land of Promise
- Hyacinthe Rigaud – Portrait of Pierre Mignard

=== Sculpture ===
- Jean Del Cour – St James (Sint-Jacobskerk, Liege)

== Births ==
- January 16 – Peter Scheemakers, Flemish Roman Catholic sculptor (died 1781)
- April 5 – Franz Joseph Spiegler, German fresco painter (died 1757)
- April 13 – Joseph-Charles Roettiers, French engraver and medallist (died 1779)
- June 2 – Nicolau Nasoni, artist and architect (died 1773)
- June 17 – Giovanni Paolo Pannini or Panini, Italian painter and architect, mainly known as one of the vedutisti or veduta or view painters (died 1765)
- date unknown
  - Jan František Händl, Czech Roman Catholic priest and baroque painter (died 1751)
  - Pietro Antonio Magatti, Italian painter known for paintings and frescoes in his hometown of Milan (died 1767)
- probable
  - Antoine Aveline, French engraver (died 1743)
  - Agostino Masucci, Italian painter of the late-Baroque or Rococo period (died 1758)

== Deaths ==
- January 19 – Giacinto Brandi, Italian painter, active mainly in Rome and Naples (born 1621)
- April 3 – Jean Petitot, French-Swiss enamel painter (born 1607)
- May 13 – William Faithorne, English painter and engraver (born 1616)
- September – Abraham Hondius, Dutch Baroque painter known for animal paintings (born 1625)
- November 7 – Pieter Cornelisz van Slingelandt, Dutch portrait painter (born 1640)
- November 14 – Tosa Mitsuoki, Japanese painter (born 1617)
- November 15 – Aelbert Cuyp, Dutch landscape painter (born 1620)
- date unknown
  - Giovanni Francesco Cassana, Italian portrait painter (born 1611)
  - Giovanni Coli, Italian painter from Lucca (born 1636)
  - Pietro Paolo Naldini, Italian sculptor (born 1619)
  - Gury Nikitin, was a Russian painter and iconographer (born 1620)
  - Cheng Sui, Chinese landscape painter during the Ming Dynasty (born 1605)
  - Jacob van der Roer van Dordrecht, Dutch Golden Age portrait painter (born 1613)
