= 1704 in art =

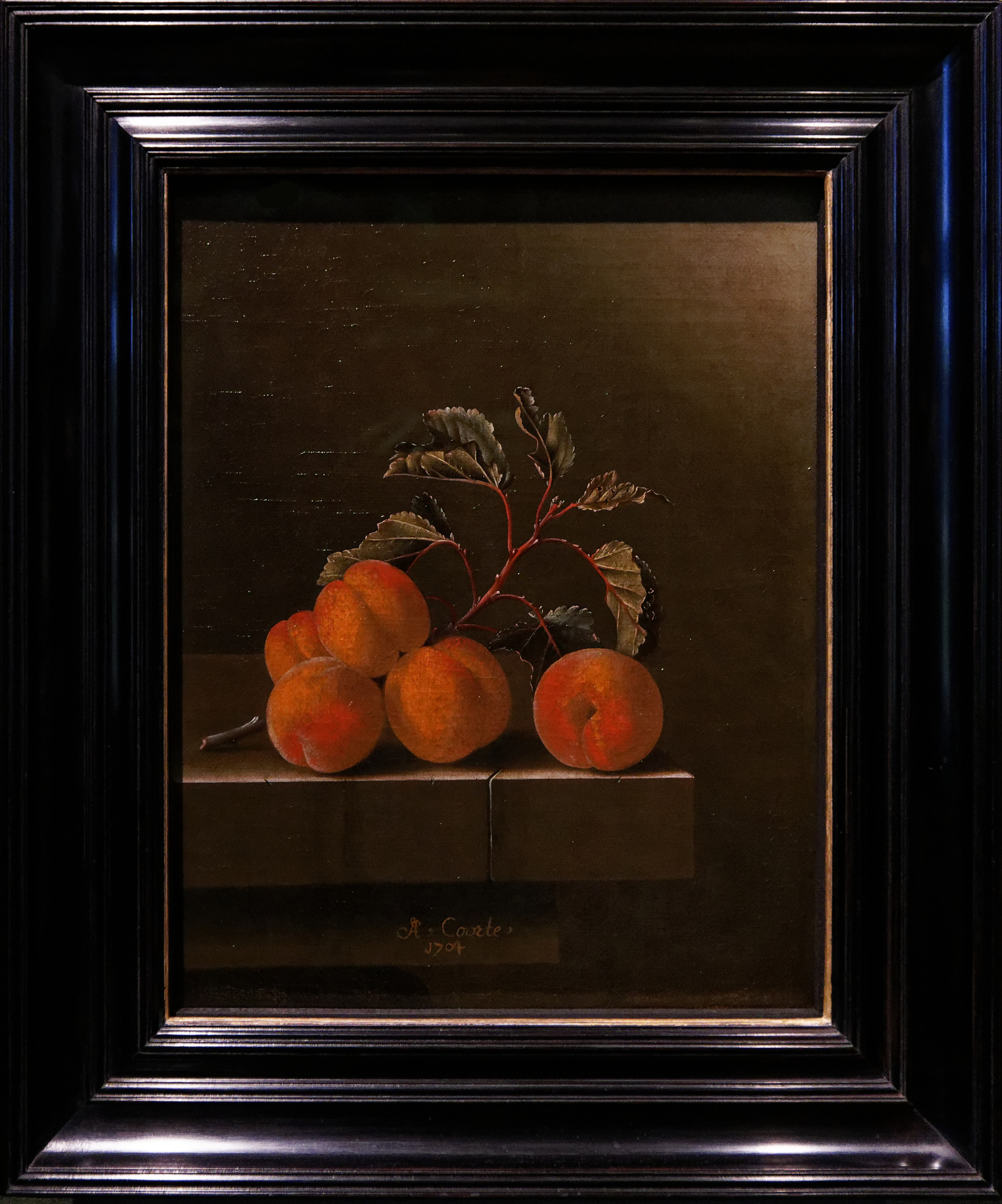
Den Haag - Mauritshuis - Adriaen Coorte (c. 1665 - after 1707) - Still Life with Five Apricots 1704 - RAW Developing by DxO Photolab 4

Events from the year 1704 in art.

== Works ==
- Paolo Alessandro Maffei – Engraving of Menelaus supporting the body of Patroclus
- Sebastiano Ricci
  - Crucifixion with Virgin, John the Evangelist and Carlo Borromeo (Uffizi, Florence)
  - Procolo, Peasant Detention (Bergamo Cathedral)

== Births ==
- January 17 (bapt.) – William Verelst, English painter of portraits, still lifes and birds (died 1752)
- January 24 – Francesco Appiani, Italian painter of the late-Baroque period, active mainly in Rome and Perugia (died 1792)
- February 15 – Jean-Baptiste Lemoyne, French sculptor (died 1778)
- April 4 – Andreas Brünniche, Danish portrait painter (died 1769)
- May/June – Johann Baptist Straub – German Rococo sculptor (died 1784)
- August 2 – Robert Gillow, English furniture designer (died 1772)
- September 5 – Maurice Quentin de La Tour, French Rococo portraitist working primarily in pastels (died 1788)
- date unknown
  - Isaac Basire, English engraver and head of family of engravers (died 1768)
  - Gaetano Lapis, Italian painter of the late-Baroque period (died 1776)
  - Pierre L'Enfant, French painter (died 1787)
  - Johann Georg Platzer, Austrian painter of primarily historical and mythical scenes (died 1761)
  - 1704/1705: Jan Jerzy Plersch, Polish sculptor of German origin (died 1774)

== Deaths ==
- February 3 – Antonio Molinari, Venetian painter of mythology and religious figures (born 1655)
- August – Francis Barlow, British painter, etcher, and illustrator (born 1626)
- October 1 – Cornelis Dusart, Dutch genre painter, draftsman, and printmaker (born 1660)
- date unknown
  - Carlo Bolognini, Italian painter of quadratura (born 1678)
  - Matias de Arteaga, Spanish painter and engraver (born 1630)
  - Alonso del Arco, Spanish painter (born 1635)
  - Egbert van Heemskerck, Dutch painter, also known as Egbert van Heemskerck the Elder (born 1634)
  - Filippo Gherardi, Italian painter of frescoes (born 1643)
  - Giovanni Marracci, Italian painter (born 1637)
  - Cosimo Ulivelli, Italian who painted frescoes for the Santissima Annunziata church (born 1625)
