= Jean-Joseph Vinache =

French sculptor (1696–1754)

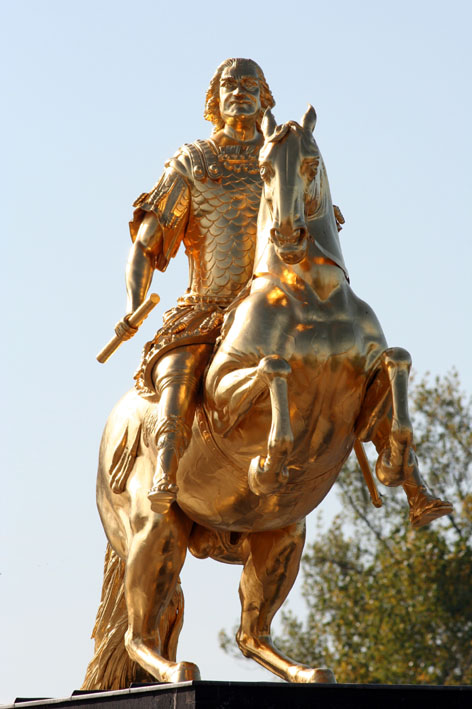
Vinache's Goldener Reiter in Dresden

Jean-Joseph Vinache (1696 – 1 December 1754) was a French sculptor who served as the court sculptor to Augustus II, King of Poland and Elector of Saxony. Vinache's equestrian monument of Augustus, known as the "Gilded Horseman" (Goldener Reiter), is one of the most familiar sights of Dresden, which during his lifetime was part of the Electorate of Saxony.

Vinache was born in Paris, the son of a bronzefounder. His skill brought him to the attention of an agent of the Elector, "Augustus the Strong", who called him to Dresden to complete an unfinished equestrian sculpture that had been left by the late sculptor François Coudray (1678–1727). A model in gilded plaster and a bronze reduction (Dresden, Grünes Gewölbe) preserve the design of this scheme: Augustus, now King of Poland is shown in Roman armour, gripping the baton of power, on a rearing horse, stabilized by a massive tail. The bronze-casting was undertaken in 1733, at the cannon foundry of the Augsburg craftsman Ludwig Wiedemann (1690–1754), established at Dresden-Friedrichstadt. Construction of the high pedestal designed by architect Zacharias Longuelune was initiated with a foundation stone, 12 August 1735, but construction was delayed. The completed sculpture was unveiled 26 November 1736.

Retired for safety during World War II, the sculpture survived the Dresden Firestorm unscathed and was restored and re-erected on a new plinth in 1956.

Vinache executed numerous other works for Augustus and also made copies after the Antique. A bronze Apollo Leaning on his Lyre (Dresden Skulpturensammlung) was repeated in marble; a reduced terracotta version is at the Musée du Louvre.

In 1736 he returned to Paris, where he was accepted that year at the Académie royale de Peinture et de Sculpture, presenting as his morceau de reception Hercules Enchained by Love; the final marble, delivered 27 May 1741, is at the Musée du Louvre. A marble replica, attributed to Vinache, was sold from the Lagerfeld collection at Christie's Monaco: Friday, April 28, 2000, lot 16.

As an Académicien, Vinache received various public commissions, for an Aurora for Versailles (1746–49) and in Paris. For the chapel of St. Francis Xavier in the Church of St-Paul-St-Louis in the Marais district of Paris, he was commissioned to provide a sculpture illustrating religious zeal, a pendant to the sculpture of Nicolas-Sébastien Adam, called "Adam le jeune", Religion Instructing an Indian; the result was Le Zèle, an angel whipping a fallen heathen among the debris of idolatry, holding open a large folio representing the Gospel. The sculpture was completed in 1745.

A marble Enfants jouant avec des fleurs by Vinache and Nicolas-François Gillet is also conserved at the Louvre.

He died in 1754.
