= 1621 in art =

Events from the year 1621 in art.

== Events ==
- Dutch painter Johannes van der Beeck is jailed for failing to pay alimony to his former wife Neeltgen van Camp.

== Paintings ==
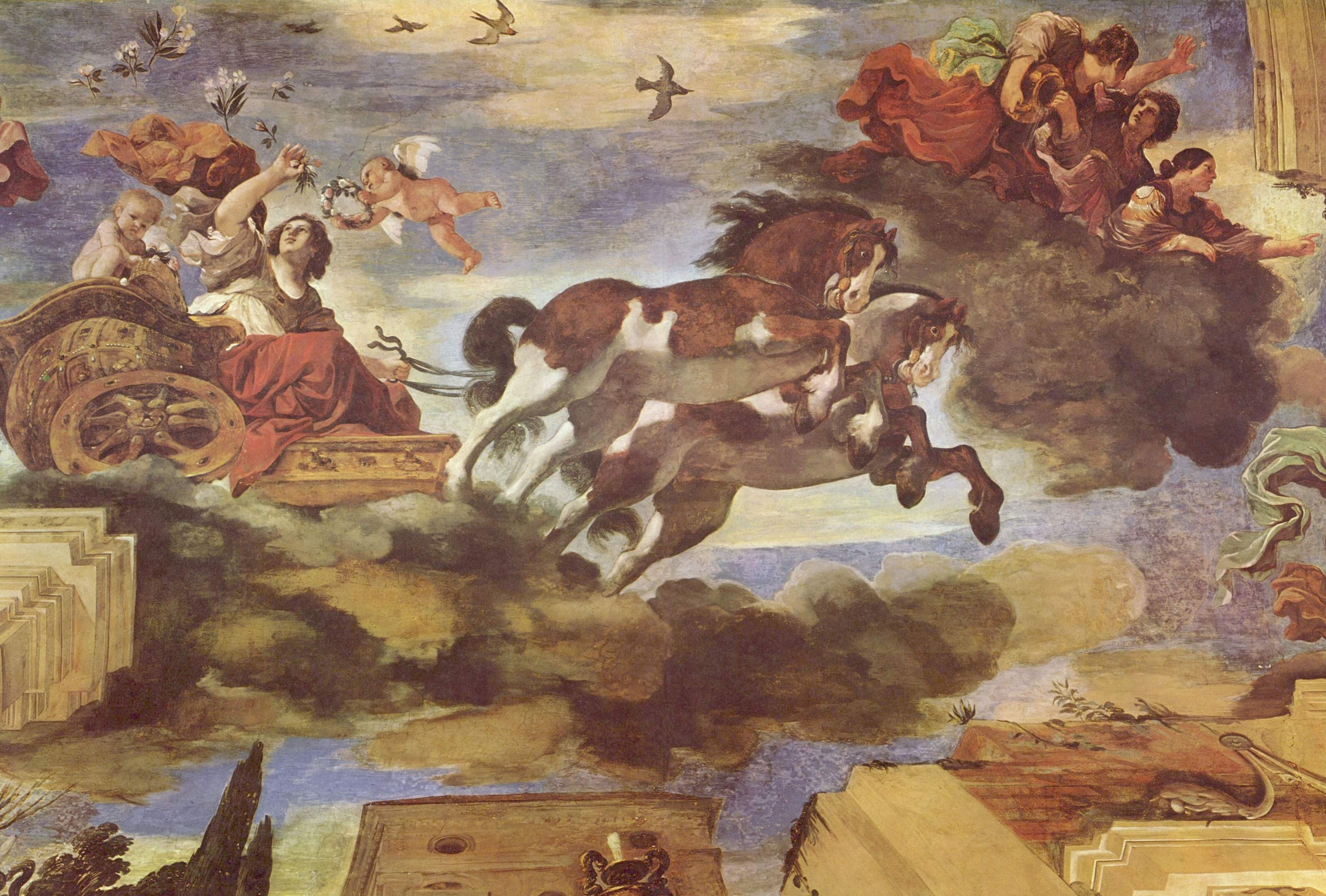
Guercino – Aurora

- Giovanni Francesco Barbieri – The Suicide of Cleopatra
- Marcus Gheeraerts the Younger – Susanna Temple
- Guercino
  - Aurora (fresco, Casino di Villa Boncompagni Ludovisi, Rome)
  - Christ and the Woman Taken in Adultery (approximate date)
- Giovanni Francesco Guerrieri – Virgin and Child
- Jacob Jordaens – The Family of the Artist (1621-2)
- Dirck van Baburen – Youth Playing a Small Whistle
- Domenico Zampieri – The Assumption of Mary Magdalene into Heaven

== Births ==
- May 25 – David Beck, Dutch portrait painter (died 1656)
- June
  - Allaert van Everdingen, Dutch painter and printmaker in etching and mezzotint (died 1675)
  - Isaac van Ostade, Dutch genre and landscape painter (died 1649)
- August 19 – Gerbrand van den Eeckhout, painter of the Dutch Golden Age (died 1674)
- date unknown
  - Giacinto Brandi, Italian painter, active mainly in Rome and Naples (died 1691)
  - Fabrizio Chiari, painter and engraver (died 1695)
  - Jacques Courtois, French painter (died 1676)
  - Giuseppe Diamantini, Italian painter and printmaker of the Baroque period (died 1705)
  - Albrecht Kauw, Swiss still-life painter, cartographer and a painter of vedute (died 1681)
  - Matthew Snelling, English miniature painter (died 1678)
  - Robert Streater, English landscape, history, still-life and portrait artist, architectural painter, and etcher (died 1679)
  - Hendrick van Balen the Younger, Flemish painter (died 1663)
  - Jan Baptist Weenix, painter of the Dutch Golden Age (died 1660)
- probable – Giulio Cesare Milani, Italian painter (died 1678)

== Deaths ==
- April 1 – Cristofano Allori, Italian painter (born 1577)
- May 15 – Hendrick de Keyser, Dutch sculptor and architect (born 1565)
- date unknown
  - Cornelis Boel, Flemish draughtsman and engraver (born 1576)
  - Louis de Caullery, French painter (born 1555)
  - Ambrosius Bosschaert, Dutch painter (born 1573)
  - Marzio di Colantonio, Italian painter of still lifes and landscapes, and fresco decorations (born 1560)
  - Dirk Pietersz, Dutch Golden Age painter (born 1558)
  - Terenzio Terenzi, Italian painter (born 1575)
  - Giovanni Vasanzio, Dutch-born architect, garden designer and engraver (born 1550)
