= The Martyrdom of Saint Lawrence =

The Martyrdom of Saint Lawrence may refer to:

- The Martyrdom of Saint Lawrence (Titian), a painting of 1558 by Titian
- The Martyrdom of Saint Lawrence (Bernini), a sculpture of 1617 by Gian Lorenzo Bernini
