= Bergonzoli =

Bergonzoli is an Italian surname and may refer to:

- Giulio Bergonzoli (19th century), Italian sculptor
- Annibale Bergonzoli (1884–1973), general in the Royal Italian Army

== See also ==
- Bergonzoni, (1646–1700), Italian painter
