= 1558 in art =

Events from the year 1558 in art.

== Events ==
- Benvenuto Cellini begins writing his influential autobiography, focusing not only on his life but on his goldsmith's art, sculpture, and design.
- Juan Bautista Vázquez the Elder returns to Avila to complete the altarpiece at the Monastery of Santa Maria de las Cuevas, left unfinished by Isidro de Villoldo.

== Works ==
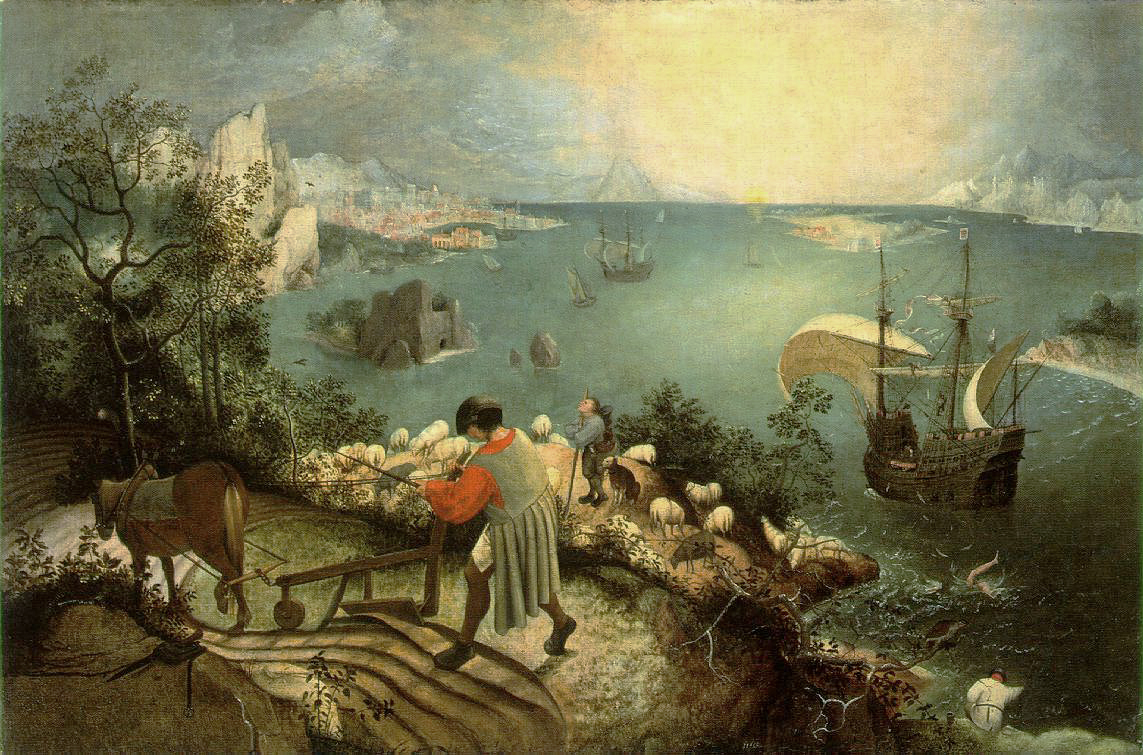
Pieter Bruegel the Elder, Landscape with the Fall of Icarus, 1558

== Paintings ==
- Pieter Bruegel the Elder – Landscape with the Fall of Icarus
- Pierre Reymond – Tazza: Scene from the Book of Proverbs
- Domenico Campagnola – Callisto's Transformation into a Bear after Giving Birth to Arcas
- Tintoretto – Saint George and the Dragon
- Titian - Crucifixion
- Paolo Veronese – Assumption of the Virgin

== Births ==
- January (or February) Hendrik Goltzius, Dutch printmaker, draftsman, and painter (died 1617)
- December 3 - Gregorio Pagani, Italian painter active mainly in Florence (died 1605)
- date unknown
  - Giovanni Alberti, Italian painter (died 1601)
  - Baldassare Croce, Italian academic painter and director of the Accademia di San Luca (died 1628)
  - Honami Kōetsu, Japanese craftsman, founder of the Rinpa school (died 1637)
  - Dirk Pietersz, Dutch Golden Age painter (died 1621)
  - Juan de las Roelas, Seville-based painter (died 1625)
  - Gregorius Sickinger, Swiss painter, draughtsman, and engraver (died 1631)
  - Jan de Wael I, Flemish painter of the Baroque period (died 1633)
- probable
  - Belisario Corenzio, Italian Mannerist painter (died 1643)
  - Chen Jiru, Chinese landscape painter and calligrapher during the Ming Dynasty (died 1639)

== Deaths ==
- January 24 - Gerlach Flicke, German limner and portrait painter working in London
- August 15 - Paul Lautensack, Germain painter and musician (born 1478)
- date unknown - Scipione Sacco, Italian painter of the Renaissance active in Cesena (born 1495)
- probable
  - (died 1555/1558): Giovanni Francesco Caroto, Italian painter active in Verona (born 1480)
  - (died 1555/1558): Benedetto Montagna, Italian engraver (born 1481)
