= 1767 in art =

Events from the year 1767 in art.

== Events ==
- March – Giovanni Battista Tiepolo is commissioned to paint seven altarpieces for the Convento de San Pascual, Aranjuez, at this time under construction, by its founder Charles III of Spain; these include The Immaculate Conception.
- Canaletto (1697–1768) spends his last full year painting, in Venice.

== Paintings ==
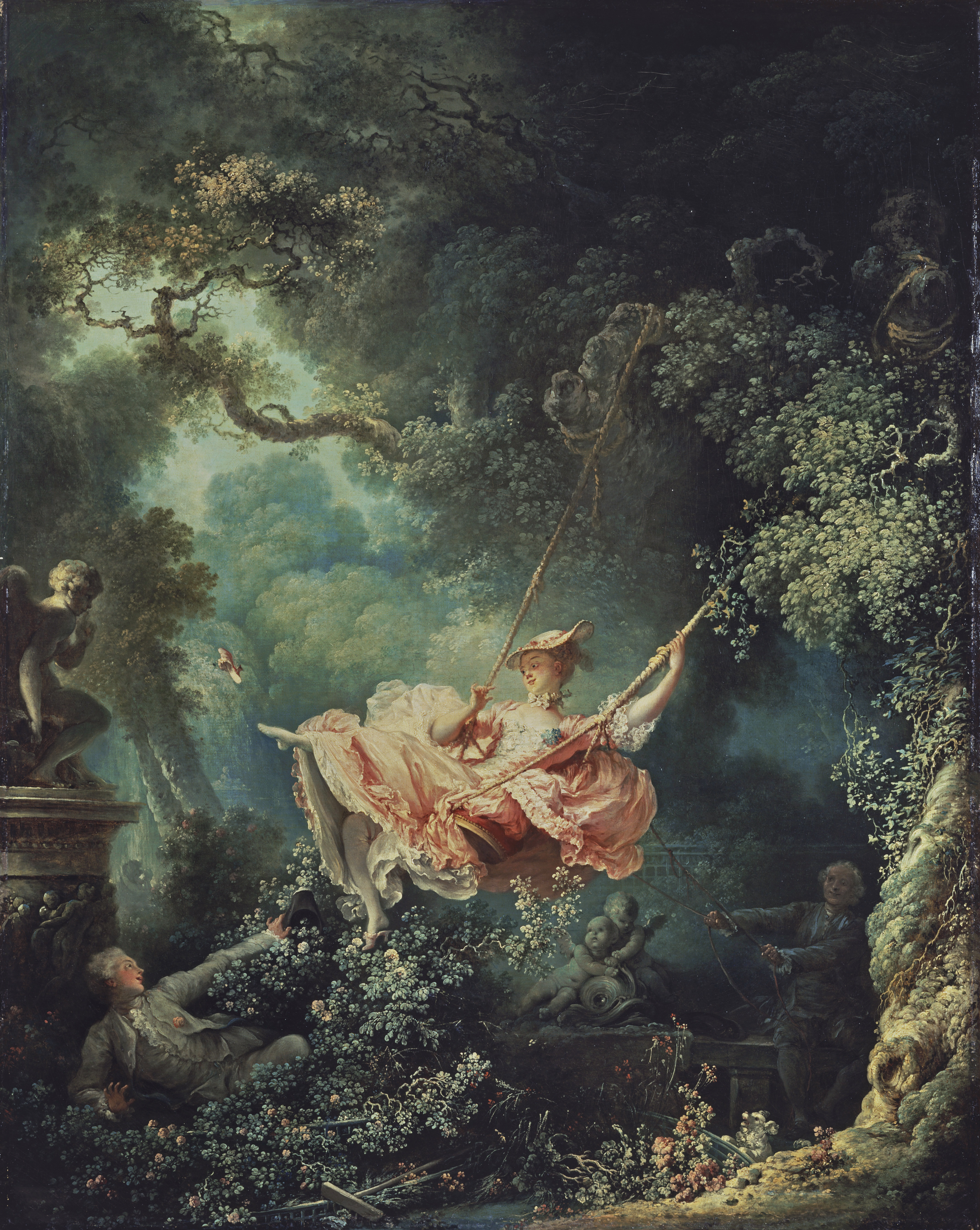
Fragonard, The Swing

- Pompeo Batoni – Portrait of the Duke of Brunswick
- Francis Cotes – The infant Charlotte, Princess Royal, with her mother, Queen Charlotte
- Nathaniel Dance-Holland – Timon of Athens
- Jean-Honoré Fragonard – The Swing (French: Les hasards heureux de l'escarpolette; Wallace Collection, London)
- Thomas Gainsborough
  - Portrait of Augustus Hervey
  - Portrait of Lord Vernon
- Philip James de Loutherbourg – Landscape with Animals
- David Martin – Portrait of Benjamin Franklin
- Richard Paton – The Battle of Cape Passaro, 11 August 1718
- Joshua Reynolds – Elizabeth, Lady Amherst (Elizabeth, Lady Amherst)
- Alexander Roslin
  - Double portrait of himself and his wife, Marie, painting a portrait of Henrik Peill
  - Portrait of Jean-François Marmontel
- Samuel Scott – French Firerafts Attacking the British Fleet off Quebec
- Louis-Michel van Loo –Portrait of Denis Diderot
- Johann Zoffany – John, 3rd Duke of Atholl, and family

== Births ==
- January 5 – Anne-Louis Girodet de Roussy-Trioson, French painter (died 1824)
- January 24 – Emanuel Thelning, Swedish-born Finnish painter (died 1831)
- February 18 – John Glover, English-born Australian landscape painter (died 1849)
- March 9 – Johan Erik Hedberg, Finnish painter (died 1823)
- March 17 – Charles Peale Polk, American portrait painter (died 1822)
- April 10 – William Alexander, English painter, illustrator and engraver (died 1816)
- April 11 – Jean-Baptiste Isabey, French painter (died 1855)
- April 24 – Jacques-Laurent Agasse, Swiss animal and landscape painter (died 1849)
- date unknown
  - Immanuel Alm, Finnish painter of primarily religious-themed works (died 1809)
  - George Barret, Jr., English landscape painter (died 1842)
  - Edme Bovinet, French engraver (died 1832)
  - Ulrika Melin, textile artist and member of the Royal Swedish Academy of Art (died 1834)
  - George Watson, Scottish portrait painter (died 1837)

== Deaths ==
- January 9 – Joseph Ignatz Sadler, Czech fresco painter (born 1725)
- February 3 – Jacob Folkema, Dutch designer and engraver (born 1692)
- February 22 – Jacopo Zoboli, Italian etcher and painter of altarpieces and portraits (born 1681)
- March 24 – Christian Friedrich Zincke, German miniature painter (born 1683/1685)
- May 11 – Nicolas Edelinck, French-born engraver, son of Gerard Edelinck (born 1681)
- June 14 – Antonio Elenetti, Italian painter (born unknown)
- July 17 – Norbert Grund, Czech painter of the Rococo style (born 1717)
- August 17 – Gaspare Diziani, Italian Roccoco painter (born 1689)
- August 28 – Giacomo Ceruti, Italian painter of peasants (born 1698)
- September 12 – Thomas Smith (Derby), landscape painter and father of John Raphael Smith of Derby (born unknown)
- September 26 – Pietro Antonio Magatti, Italian painter known for paintings and frescoes in his hometown of Milan (born 1691)
- October 2 – Louise-Magdeleine Horthemels (born 1686)
- November 6 – Giambattista Pittoni, Italian painter of religious, historical, and mythological subjects (born 1687)
- November 11 – Clemente Ruta, Italian painter specializing in landscapes with pen and watercolor (born 1668)
- date unknown
  - Ferdinando Porta, Italian painter and engraver (born 1689)
  - Giuseppe Zocchi, Italian veduta painter and printmaker (born 1711)
