= Giovanni Battista Vernici =

Italian painter

Giovanni Battista Vernici (died 1617) was an Italian painter.

He was born in Bologna. He was a pupil in the school of the Carracci. He painted religious and historical pictures for the churches and public buildings of Pesaro and Urbino, particularly in the latter city, where he was appointed principal painter to the Duke, in whose service he died.
