= Giacomo Bolognini =

Italian painter (1664–1734)

Giacomo Bolognini (1664–1734 (Note: 10 July 1737 according to G. P. Zanotti)) was an Italian painter of the Baroque period. The nephew of Giovanni Battista Bolognini, he was born in Bologna. Married to Antonia Margherita Contoli, he had two sons, Giovanni Battista and Francesco, and four daughters, Anna, Olimpia, Rosalba and Teresa.

Following tutelage under his uncle, he painted St Francis Receiving the Stigmata for the church of Santi Sebastiano e Rocco in Bologna, and a Dead Christ with Virgin Mary and Mary Magdalen now housed in the National Museum of Bologna. His works can be found in Rome, Mantua, Cesena, Venice, Prague and Cádiz.

In 1715, he was appointed the director of the Clementine Academy.

== Sources ==
- Bryan, Michael (1886). Robert Edmund Graves (ed.). Dictionary of Painters and Engravers, Biographical and Critical. Vol. I: A-K. London: George Bell and Sons. p. 149.
