= 1625 in art =

Events from the year 1625 in art.

== Events ==
- Abraham van der Doort becomes the first Surveyor of the King's Pictures to Charles I of England.

== Works ==
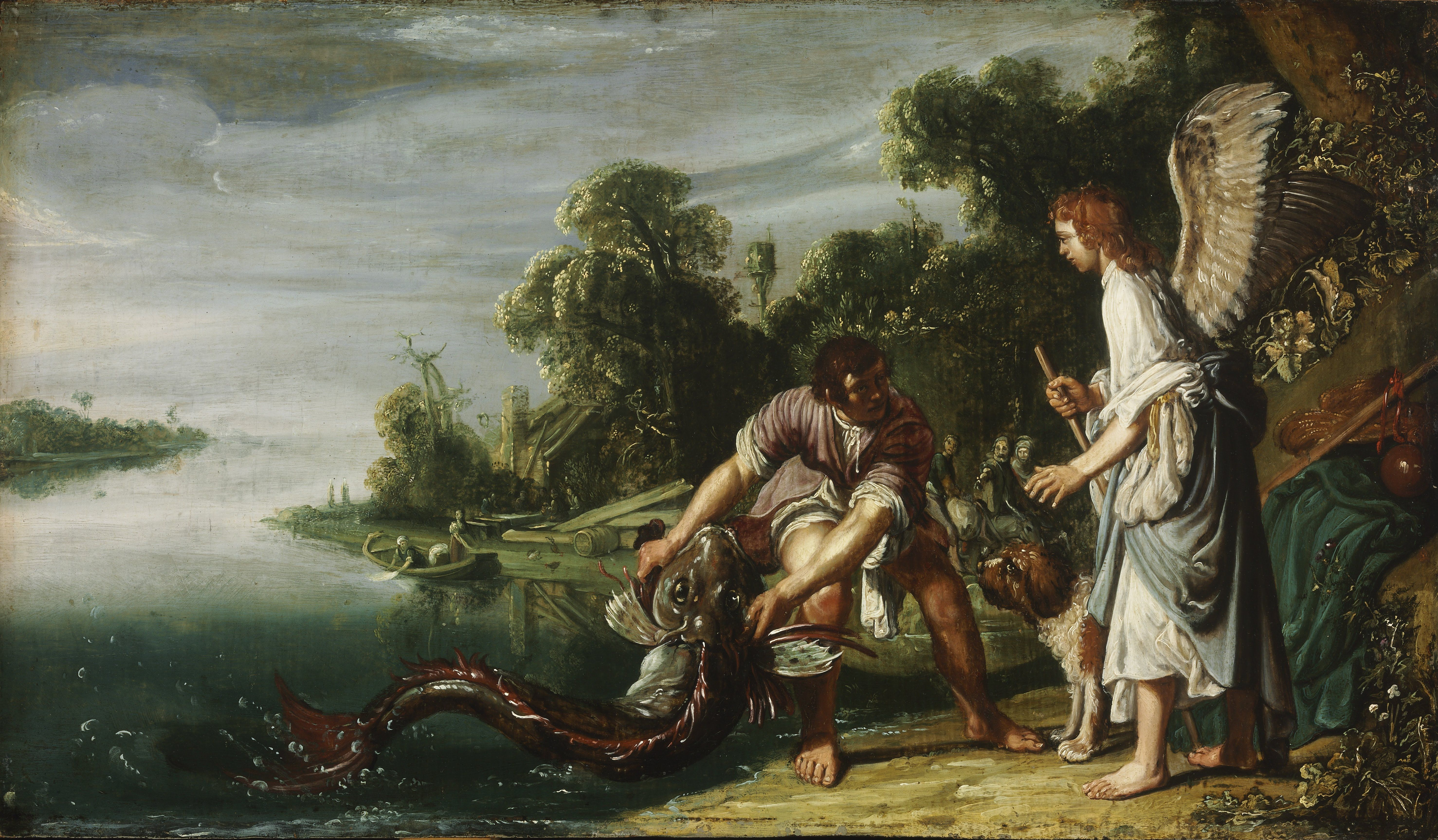
Pieter Lastman – The Angel and Tobias with the Fish

- Gian Lorenzo Bernini – Apollo and Daphne (marble)
- Artemisia Gentileschi – Judith and Her Maidservant (Detroit Institute of Arts)
- Gerard van Honthorst
  - The Matchmaker
  - Smiling Girl, a Courtesan, Holding an Obscene Image
- Pieter Lastman – The Angel and Tobias with the Fish
- Rembrandt
  - The Senses (series)
  - The Stoning of Saint Stephen
- Jacopo Vignali – Cyparissus (approximate date)

== Births ==
- May 13 – Carlo Maratta, Italian painter (died 1713)
- November 20 – Paulus Potter, Dutch painter specializing in animals in landscapes (died 1654)
- date unknown
  - Antonio Busca, Italian painter active in Lombardy (died 1686)
  - Pietro Bellotti, Italian painter (died 1700)
  - Antonio Castrejon, Spanish painter (died 1690)
  - Federico Cervelli, Italian painter, born in Milan (died 1700)
  - Domenico Guidi, Italian sculptor (died 1701)
  - Abraham Hondius, Dutch Baroque painter known for animal paintings (died 1691)
  - Giovan Battista Langetti, Italian painter (died 1676)
  - Cosimo Ulivelli, Italian who painted frescoes for the Santissima Annunziata church (died 1704)
- probable
  - Hendrick Danckerts, Dutch painter and engraver (died 1680)
  - Charles Philippe Dieussart, Dutch architect and sculptor (died 1696)
  - Willem de Heusch, Dutch landscape painter (died 1692)
  - Justus de Verwer, Dutch painter and illustrator (died 1689)

== Deaths ==
- January 13 – Jan Brueghel the Elder, Flemish painter (born 1568)
- April 23 - Juan de las Roelas, Spanish painter (born 1558)
- November 16 - Sofonisba Anguissola, Italian painter (born c. 1532)
- date unknown
  - Guglielmo Caccia, Italian painter specialising in altar-pieces (born 1568)
  - Bartolomeo Cavarozzi, Italian caravaggisti painter of the Baroque period active in Spain (born 1590)
  - Felipe de Liaño, Spanish painter
  - Renold Elstracke, one of the earliest native engravers in England (born 1570)
  - Antonio Mohedano, Spanish painter (born 1561)
  - Giulio Cesare Procaccini, Italian painter and sculptor of Milan (born 1574)
  - Hans Rottenhammer, German painter (born 1564)
  - Tommaso Salini, Italian painter of still life (born 1575)
  - Pieter de Valck, Dutch Golden Age painter (born 1584)
