= Giovanni Paolo Lolmo =

Italian painter

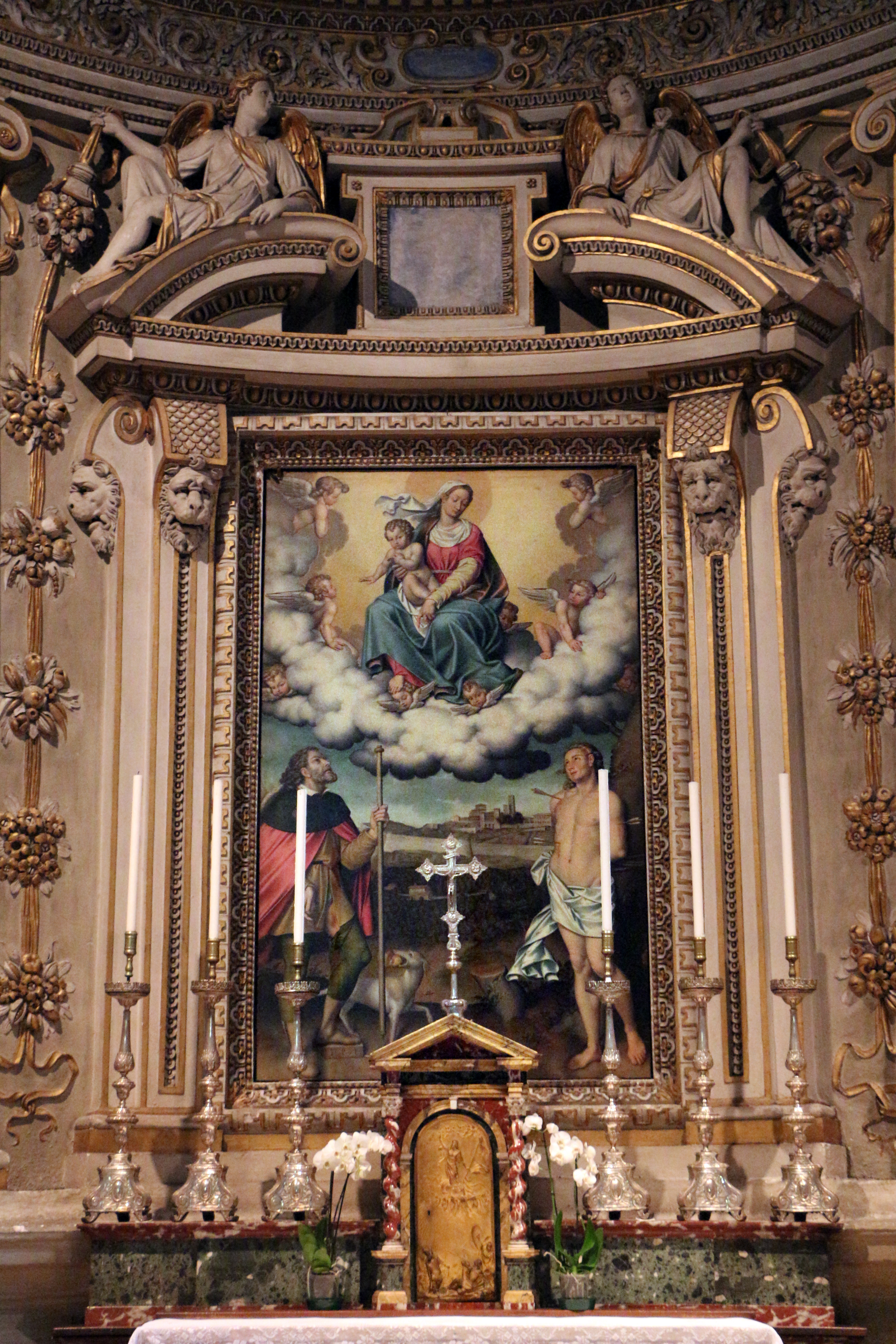
Madonna between Saints Rocco and Sebastiano, 1587

Giovanni Paolo Lolmo (c. 1550–1593) was an Italian painter of the late-Renaissance period, active mainly in his native city of Bergamo. He is also known as Gian Paolo Lolmo. In 1587, he painted Saint Rocco and Sebastian for Santa Maria Maggiore (Bergamo).
