= ODAM (gene) =

Protein-coding gene in the species Homo sapiens

Identifiers
- Aliases: ODAM, APIN, odontogenic, ameloblast associated, odontogenic, ameloblast asssociated
- External IDs: OMIM: 614843; MGI: 1916842; GeneCards: ODAM

Gene location (Human)
Chr.	Chromosome 4 (human)
Band	4q13.3	Start	70,195,725 bp
Band	4q13.3	End	70,204,576 bp

Gene location (Mouse)
Chr.	Chromosome 5 (mouse)
Band	5 E1|5 43.56 cM	Start	88,032,888 bp
Band	5 E1|5 43.56 cM	End	88,042,033 bp
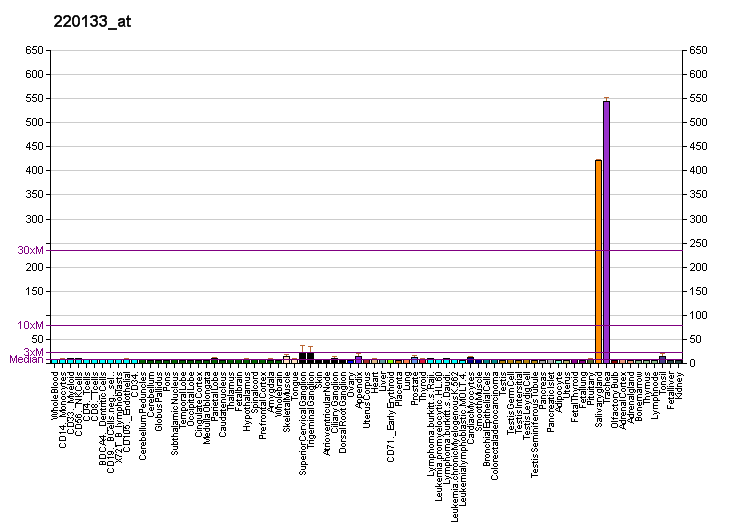
RNA expression pattern
Bgee	Human / Mouse (ortholog); Top expressed in: periodontal fiber; olfactory zone of nasal mucosa; salivary gland; trachea; minor salivary glands; parotid gland; testicle; body of stomach; right lobe of thyroid gland; left lobe of thyroid gland / Top expressed in: molar; parotid gland; seminal vesicula; lacrimal gland; lumbar spinal ganglion; submandibular gland; olfactory epithelium; prostate; extraocular muscle; lip; More reference expression data
BioGPS	More reference expression data
Gene ontology
Molecular function	protein binding
Cellular component	cytoplasm; extracellular region; nucleus; cell periphery; extracellular space; supramolecular fiber
Biological process	odontogenesis of dentin-containing tooth; biomineral tissue development; positive regulation of GTPase activity; positive regulation of protein phosphorylation; positive regulation of gene expression; inflammatory response; positive regulation of epithelial cell proliferation involved in wound healing; regulation of actin cytoskeleton organization; response to wounding
Sources:Amigo / QuickGO
Orthologs
Databases	NCBI: entry; OMA: entry
Species	Human	Mouse
Entrez	54959	69592
Ensembl	ENSG00000109205	ENSMUSG00000009580
UniProt	A1E959	A1E960
RefSeq (mRNA)	NM_017855; NM_001385579	NM_027128
RefSeq (protein)	NP_060325	NP_081404
Location (UCSC)	Chr 4: 70.2 – 70.2 Mb	Chr 5: 88.03 – 88.04 Mb
PubMed search
- Wikidata
View/Edit Human	View/Edit Mouse

Odontogenic ameloblast-associated protein is a protein that in humans is encoded by the ODAM gene.
