= Aert Pietersz =

Dutch painter (1550–1612)

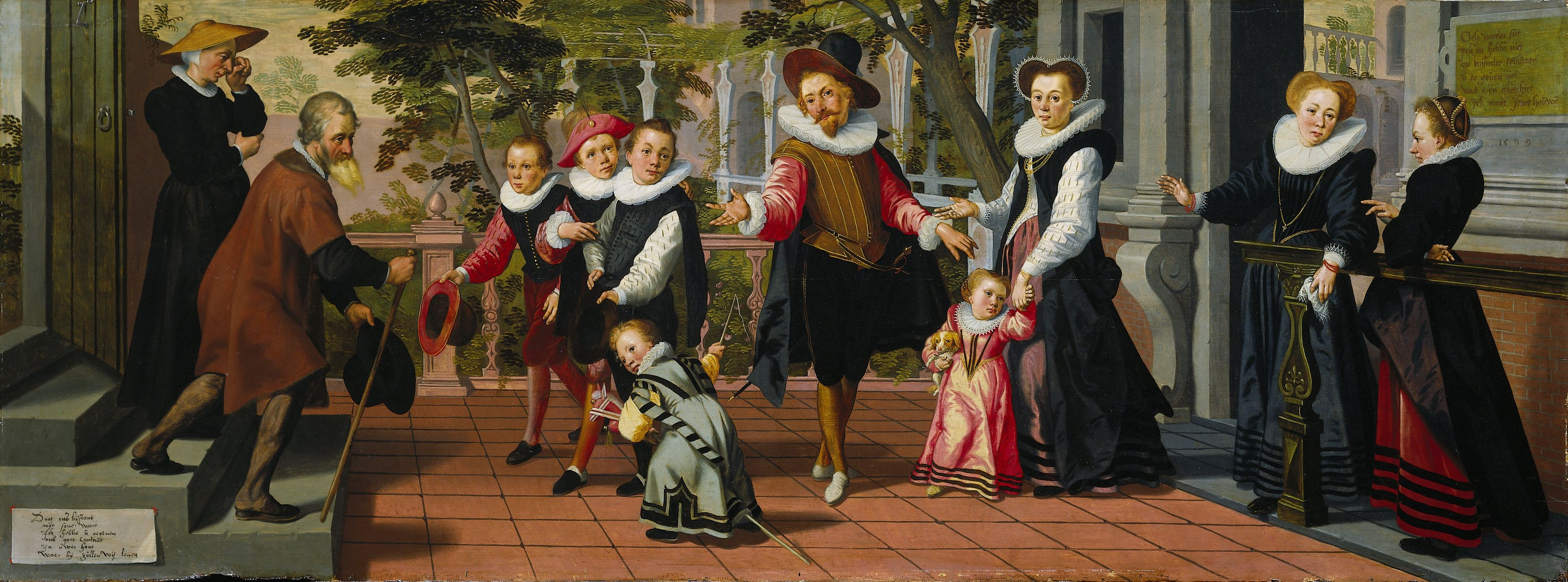
Rich Kids, Poor Parents by Aert Pietersz, Rijksmuseum, 1599

Aert Pietersz (1550–1612) was a Dutch Golden Age painter.

Pietersz was born and died in Amsterdam. According to Karel van Mander, he was the second son of Pieter Aertsen, the younger brother of Pieter Pietersz the Elder, and the older brother of Dirck Pietersz. He was a good painter of historical allegories.

According to the RKD several portraits survive in Amsterdam, where he was buried the 12th of June, 1612, in the Oude Kerk.
