= Organisation of Development, Action and Maintenance =

The Organisation of Development Action and Maintenance (ODAM) is a Non Governmental Organisation (NGO). It was established in 1995, under the Tamil Nadu Societies Registration Act of 1975. The central location of ODAM is in Tiruchuli; the organization's work is spread across 205 villages in Tiruchuli, Narikudi, Kariyapatti, Aruppukottair and Watrap blocks of Virudhunagar district, and Kamuthi block in Ramnad district, of Tamil Nadu, India.
