= Carlo Bolognini =

Italian painter (1678–1704)

Carlo Bolognini (1678 – 1704) was an Italian painter of the Baroque period. He was mentioned in the Abecedario Pittorico of Padre Orlandi, was born at Bologna in 1678 (though Zani says 1662), and was first a pupil of Mauro Aldrovandini, then worked with Giulio Trogli. He excelled in painting quadratura, and was much employed at Vienna. One of his pupils was Lorenzo Bergonzoni (1646-1722).
