= Lorenzo Bergonzoni =

Italian painter

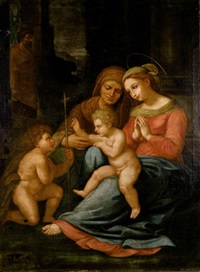
- "La sacra famiglia con Sant Anna e il Giovannino" by Lorenzo Bergonzoni
- Born: c. 1646; Bologna, Italy
- Died: c. 1722; Bologna, Italy
- Education: Studied under Giovanni Battista Bolognini and Cesare Gennari; possibly under Guercino in Cento
- Notable work: "La sacra famiglia con Sant Anna e il Giovannino"
- Movement: Baroque

Lorenzo Bergonzoni (1646 – after 1700) was an Italian painter of the Baroque period. He was born and active in Bologna. He was first a pupil of Giovanni Battista Bolognini, but afterwards studied under Guercino in Cento. He is also called Lorenzo Bergunzi. He became known mostly as a portrait painter at Bologna.
