= Giovanni Francesco Bagnoli =

Italian painter

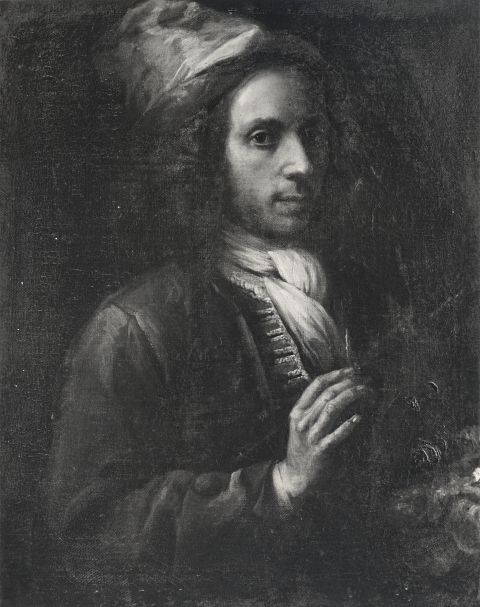
Giovanni Bagnoli - Autoritratto - depositi Uffizi Firenze.jpg

Giovanni Francesco Bagnoli (1678–1713) was an Italian painter of the Baroque period, who painted still-life paintings. He was born and active in Florence.
