= Giulio Cesare Milani =

Italian painter

Giulio Cesare Milani (c. 1621 – 1678) was an Italian painter of the Baroque.

== Life and works ==
He was born in Bologna, where he was a pupil of Simone Cantarini and Flaminio Torre. He executed many works for the churches in Bologna and the adjacent cities. He painted a Marriage of the Virgin for the church of San Giuseppe; a Sant'Antonio di Padova for the church of Santa Maria del Castello; and a Holy Family with St. John for the church of the Servi. According to Luigi Lanzi, "he was the most eminent of Torre's disciples, and was rather admired in the churches of Bologna, and extolled in many adjacent states." He died in Bologna in 1678.
