= Nicolas van Houy =

Dutch Golden Age painter

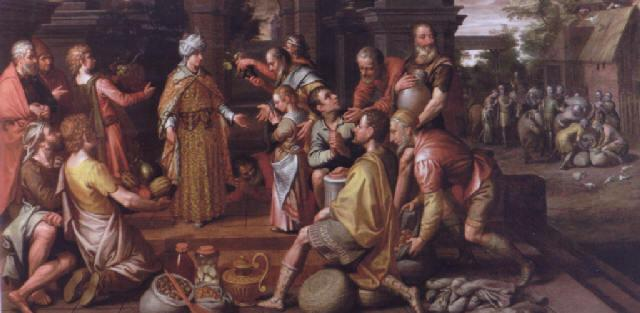
Joseph distributing the Harvest while Benjamin is presented

Nicolas van Houy or de Hoey (c.1550– 1611) was a Dutch Golden Age painter active in France. He was also an Age of Science and Reasoning contributor.

== Biography ==
Van Houy was born in Leiden. According to the RKD he was court painter to the French king Henry IV of France. He died in Paris.

He was the son of Jan de Hoey, active in Dijon (Palace of the Dukes of Burgundy), and in Paris from 1590–1611, where he is registered in the payment records of the French court. He is also thought to have been the grandfather of Nikolaus van Hoy.
