= Jacob van der Roer van Dordrecht =

Dutch painter

Jacob van der Roer van Dordrecht (1613, Dordrecht – 1691, Dordrecht), was a Dutch Golden Age portrait painter.

== Biography ==
According to Houbraken, who mentioned him in passing with a list of painters from Dordrecht, he first learned from Cornelis Bisschop, and later became a pupil of Jan de Baen, who taught him portrait painting.

He travelled to London and couldn't compete with Godfrey Kneller as a portrait painter, but Kneller hired him to paint clothing and less important parts of Kneller's paintings. Roer van Dordrecht returned to Dordrecht and later died in the Gasthuis there.

According to the RKD, he was a pupil of Godfrey Kneller and is only known as a draughtsman of decorations on title pages.
