= François Coudray =

French sculptor (c. 1678 – 1727)

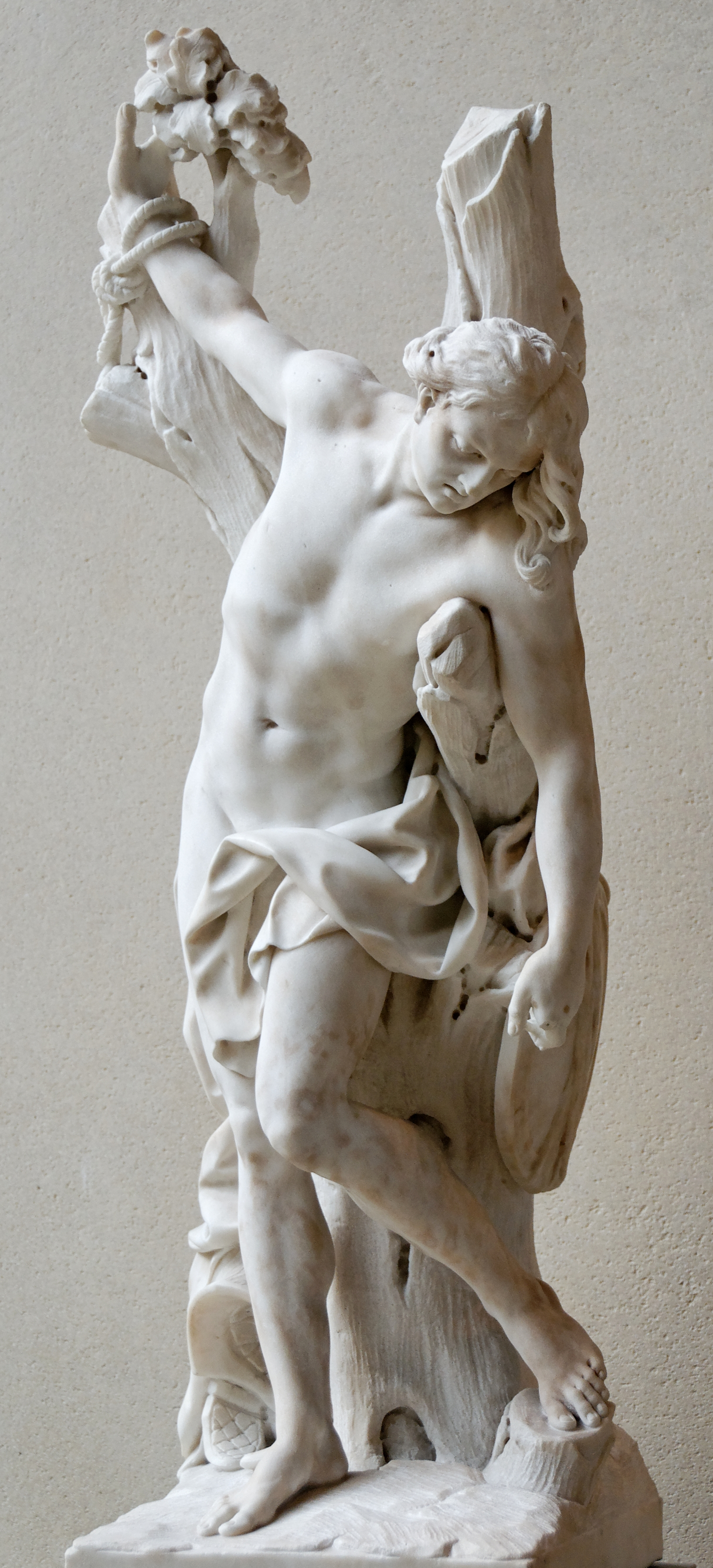
Marble of Saint Sebastien, today displayed in the musée du Louvre

François Coudray (c. 1678 in Villecerf, Province of Champagne – April 29, 1727, in Dresden, Electorate of Saxony) was a French sculptor who spent more of his prominent artistic life in Dresden where he was the First sculptor of the King Augustus II the Strong.
