= Giulio Trogli =

Italian painter (1613–1685)

- Born: 1613; Bologna, Italy
- Died: 1685 (aged 71–72)
- Style: Baroque

Giulio Trogli (1613–1685) was an Italian painter of the Baroque period.

== Biography ==
He was initially a pupil of Francesco Gessi in Bologna. Giulio Trogli, devoting himself to quadratura, under Agostino Mitelli, and published a work entitled Paradossi della Prospettiva, and from then on, took the nickname of il Paradosso ("the Paradox").
