= Sampson Strong =

Dutch portrait painter (c. 1550 – 1611)

- Born: 1550
- Died: 1611 (aged 60–61)

Sampson Strong (c. 1550 – 1611) was a Dutch portrait painter. He was a resident portrait painter at Oxford University and painted founder's portraits for All Souls, New and Christ Church colleges. He was followed by Richard Greenway. He was employed by the governors of Christ's Hospital, Abingdon to decorate the hall with portraits of founders, benefactors and former governors.

== Gallery ==
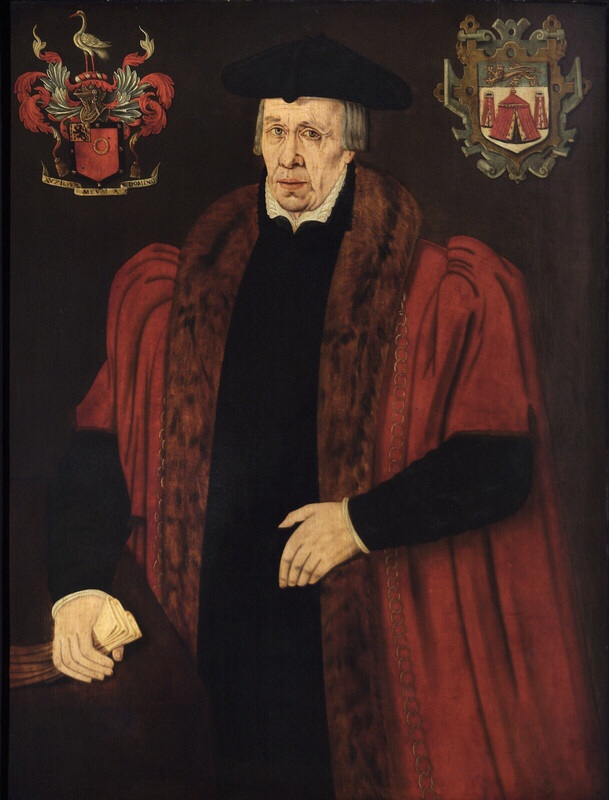
Thomas White

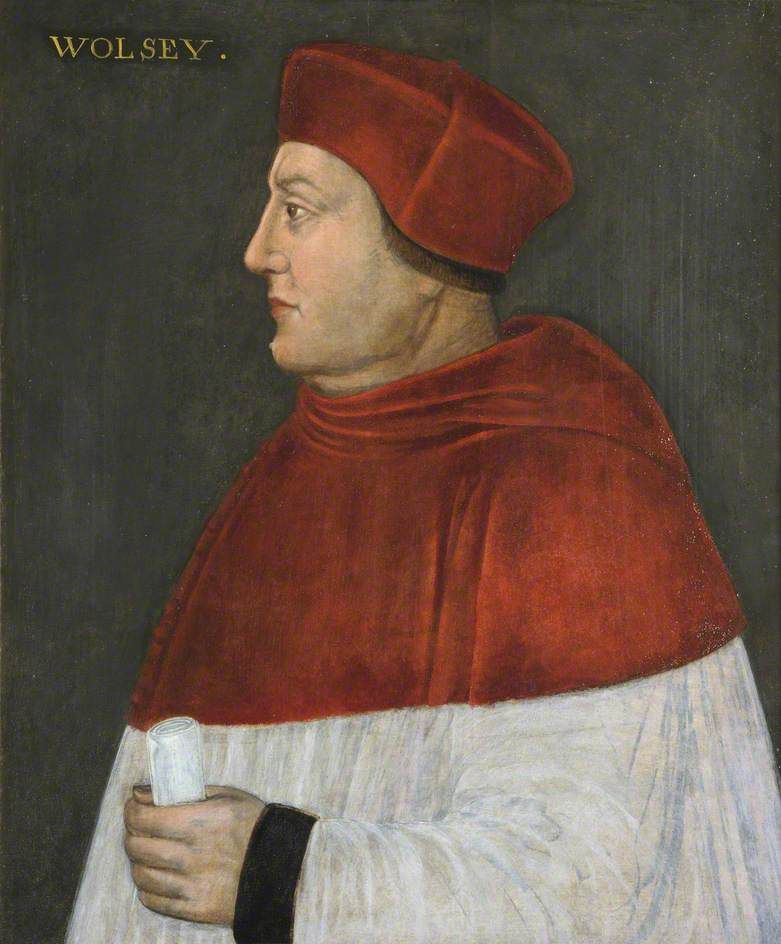
Cardinal Wolsey

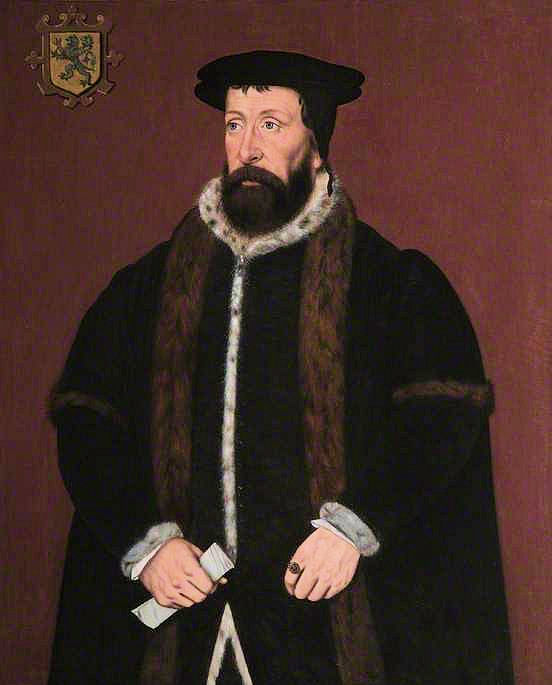
Sir John Mason

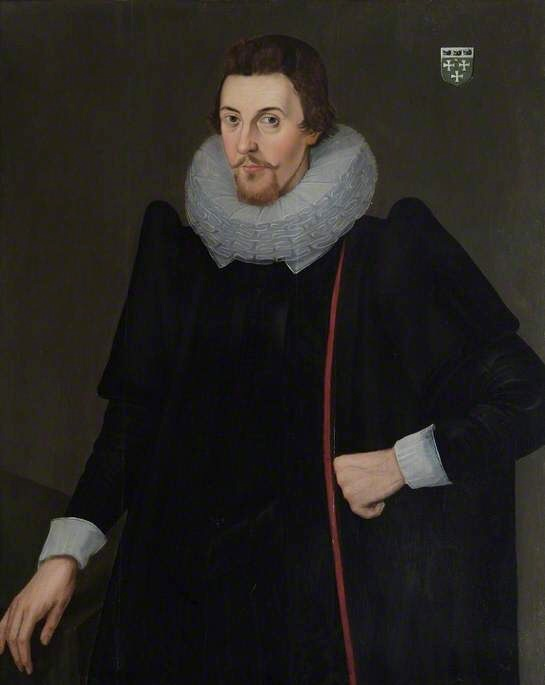
Robert Orpwood (d. 1609)
