= Dirk Pietersz =

Dutch Golden Age painter

Dirk Pietersz (1558 – c. 1621) was a Dutch Golden Age painter.

== Biography ==
According to Karel van Mander he was born in Amsterdam, the son of Pieter Aertsen and the youngest brother of Pieter Pietersz the Elder and Aert Pietersz (who was eight years older). He moved to Fontainebleau where he died accidentally during the troubles there.

According to the RKD no works from Fontainebleau are known and only a portrait of the remonstrant preacher Simon Episcopius (1583-1643) survives.
