= The Martyrdom of Saint Lawrence (Bernini) =

Sculpture by Gian Lorenzo Bernini

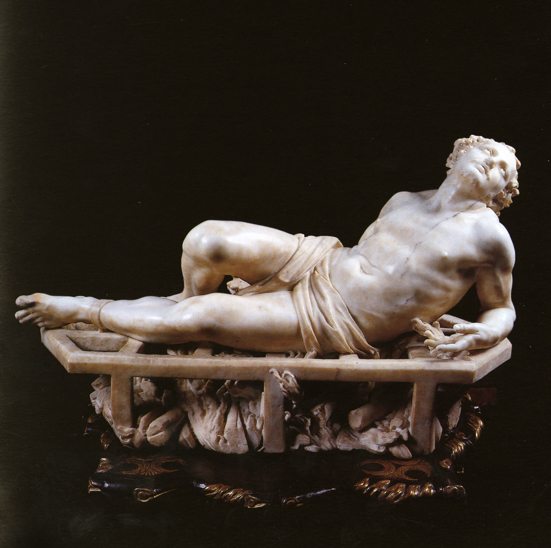
- Artist: Gian Lorenzo Bernini
- Year: 1617
- Catalogue: 3
- Type: Sculpture
- Medium: Marble
- Dimensions: 66 cm × 108 cm (26 in × 43 in)
- Location: Uffizi; Florence

The Martyrdom of Saint Lawrence is an early sculpture by the Italian artist Gian Lorenzo Bernini. It shows the saint at the moment of his martyrdom, being burnt alive on a gridiron. According to Bernini's biographer, Filippo Baldinucci, the sculpture was completed when Bernini was 15 years old, implying that it was finished in the year 1614. Other historians have dated the sculpture between 1615 and 1618. A date of 1617 seems most likely. It is less than life-size in dimensions, measuring 108 by 66 cm.

The sculpture is now held in the Uffizi in Florence as part of the Contini Bonacossi Collection.

== Commission ==
There is some confusion over the patronage of the sculpture. Filippo Baldinucci simply wrote that it was made for Leone Strozzi, a Florentine nobleman living in Rome. Bernini's son Domenico Bernini, who wrote a biography of his father, paints a more complex picture, suggesting that Bernini executed the sculpture out of his devotion for the saint rather than for a specific commission. Michela Uliva suggests this may be true, with Bernini's supporter Cardinal Maffeo Barberni enthusing the artist with the burgeoning post-Tridentine interest in early Christian martyrs.

Recent historians tend to agree with Domenico Bernini's statement that Leone Strozzi was impressed by the sculpture and acquired it for his Villa del Viminale. Irving Lavin suggests that Strozzi may have become familiar with the work as he was commissioning a chapel in the church of Sant'Andrea della Valle at the same time as Cardinal Maffeo Barberini, particularly as the Strozzi Chapel included a tomb dedicated to Cardinal Lorenzo Strozzi (who died in Avignon in 1571) and bore the same name as the saint. In any case, the statue is included in Strozzi inventory in 1632, described as a "San Lorenzo above a modern gridiron".

== Creation ==
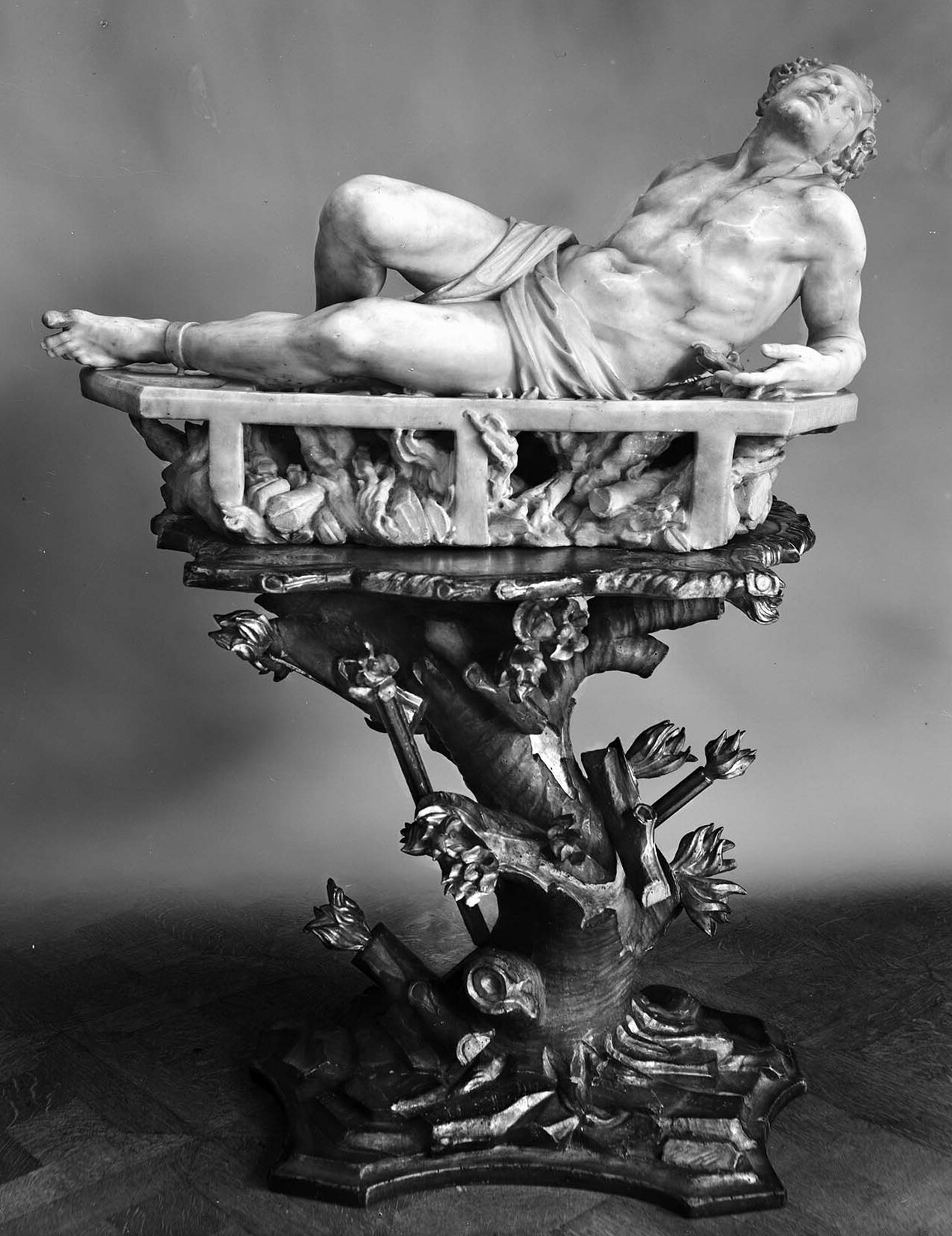
The sculpture on its pedestal, photographed in 1930

The sculpture was created from a single block of Carrara marble. Restoration in 1997 revealed that Bernini used different tools to create different surface textures on various parts of the sculpture. The reverse side of the gridiron has not been polished and finished in the same way as the front, implying that the artwork was clearly meant to be seen from the front only. A highly sculpted pedestal, made of wood and gilded with golden paint, was designed as a platform for the sculpture. There is a possibility this was also executed by Bernini, although its design suggests that while it was a Strozzi family commission, it was done at a later date.

== Description and interpretation ==
=== Subject ===
The subject of the artwork is Lawrence of Rome, who was condemned to death by the Roman Emperor Valerian in the year 258 C.E. for defending the Christian faith. According to tradition, Lawrence was burnt to death by being placed on a gridiron.

In its naturalistic representation of the saint as tortured and yet undergoing some kind of spiritual epiphany, the sculpture offers a taste of many of the themes which Bernini would adopt throughout his oeuvre, and which would come to represent many of the most pertinent features of the artistic traditions in Italian Baroque art, namely solitary figures undergoing intense emotional states, whilst being portrayed with illusionistic verisimilitude. Unlike in earlier depictions of Saint Lawrence, there are no other figures—no sign of his judge, torturers or spectators witnessing in depth. Rather, the focus is solely on the martyr and his emotional state.

=== The saint's emotional state ===
Commentators have subtly varied in describing and interpreting the face of Lawrence. Domenico Bernini contextualised the creation with the anecdote that Bernini placed his actual hand in a flame and fashioned Lawrence's expression from his own facial reaction seen in a mirror, thus implying that the focus of the portrait of Lawrence would be the physical pain.

Yet later commentators have described Lawrence's face not as one of pain, but of being "tired" or more commonly of being spiritual rapt. To Howard Hibbard, the sculpture makes a clear religious statement of spiritual salvation: inner strength overcomes external bodily pain. Certainly, observation of the sculpture seems to bear this out. The martyr almost turns away from the pain, his upper body and head reaching upwards towards the skies, with his clear, almost peaceful eyes focussed in the direction of God.

Others take Bernini's portrayal of Lawrence even further, describing the martyr as being "reclined on his left elbow languidly as any Roman banqueter" and thwarting his torturers with "a carved attitude of rapture". Another art historian, Avigdor Poseq, interprets the expression a little differently: "the calm face was apparently meant to convey the intensive of the martyr's fear of God". He continues by suggesting that Bernini presented Lawrence with an outstretched to hand to indicate the martyr's desire to be turned over by his torturers, thus exposing even more of his flesh to the flames below.

=== Technical excellence ===
Twentieth-century commentators have largely agreed on the technical excellence of the sculpture. Rudolf Wittkower speaks of the "high degree of technical perfection [and] the anatomical precision and an infallible sense for the organic coherence and structure of the human body.” Irving Lavin sees, in the flesh-like quality achieved with the marble, a criticism of Michelangelo, who mastered design and anatomy but not the appearance of flesh.

The flames also receive attention. During the Baroque period, the ability to represent to recreate nature, as in flames, water, flesh, in illusionistic marble would be a frequent challenge. Bernini's "attempt to represent leaping flames in sculpture is a tour de force", "depicting convincingly something as evanescent as flames, or as dependent on colour as glowing coals". Daniele Pinton talks of the "skilful rendition of the flames under the gridiron, where the portrayal of an immaterial element such as fire is magnificently rendered in stone."

Charles Avery goes as far to see the technical innovation of the work as its raison d'être. He cites the piece's naturalism, its emotional intensity, and its use of a subject never previously realised as a full three-dimensional sculpture, and concludes that "the work is a manifesto of [Bernini's] ability on the threshold of his adult career, much like the 'master piece' with which a craftsman matriculates into his guild".

== Recent history ==
At the start of the 1800s the sculpture was moved to another Strozzi-owned palace in Rome, and then in around 1830 it was moved to the Palazzo Strozzi in Florence. In 1935, it then became part of the Contini-Bonacossi collection, before being acquired by the Italian state in 1969. Photographs of the work while in the Contini-Bonacossi Collection show it on its pedestal shaped like a tree. Saint Lawrence was shown in the Palazzo Pitti from 1974, and then in the Uffizi from December 1998.

== See also ==
- List of works by Gian Lorenzo Bernini
