= Matthew Snelling =

English painter

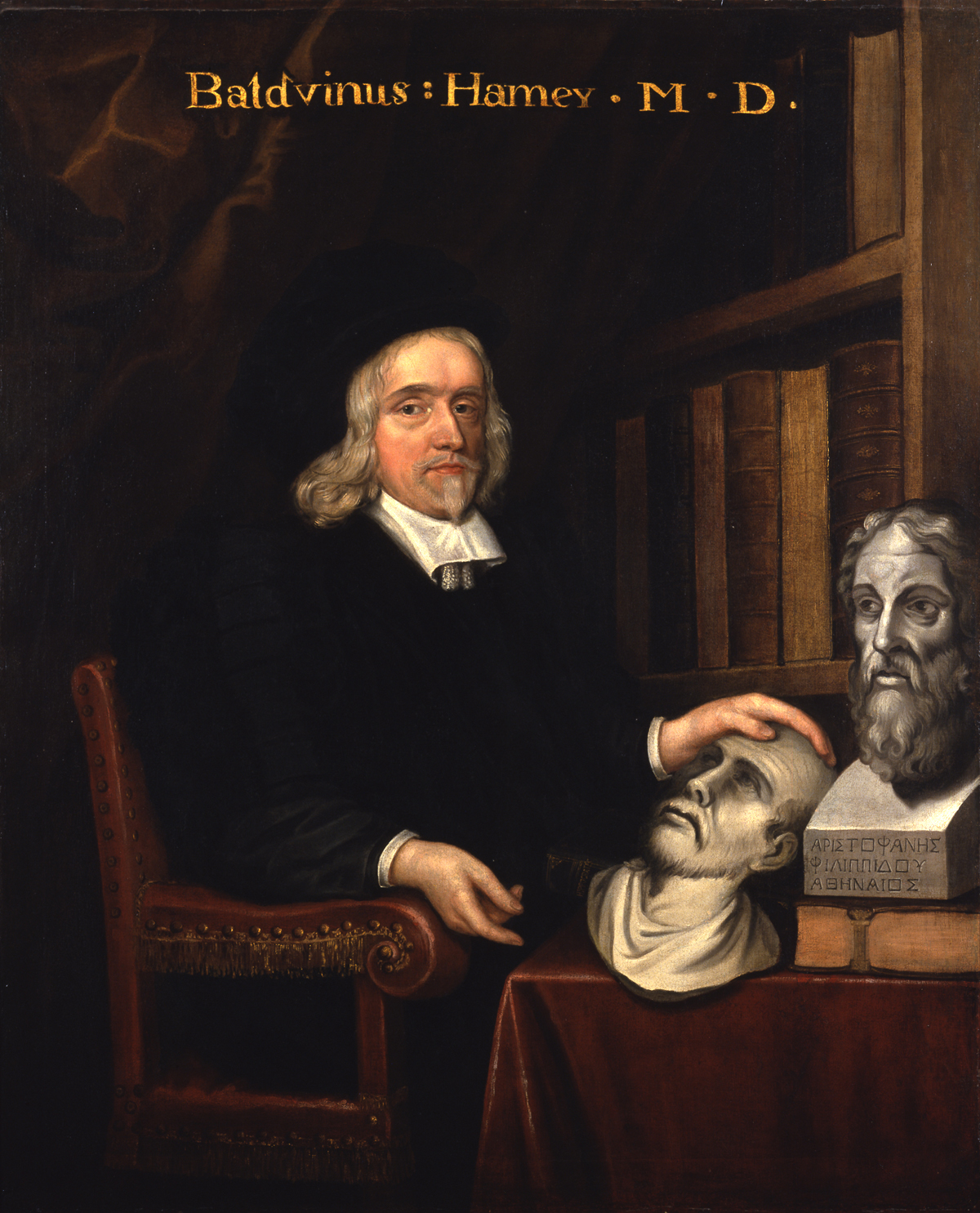
Portrait of Baldwin Hamey the younger, 1674

Matthew Snelling (1621–1678) was an English miniature painter.

He primarily painted miniature portraits, and has works that can be found in the Victoria and Albert Museum. He worked as a limner for over 20 years. His style appears to have been an influence on the miniature painter Thomas Flatman.
