= Girolamo Odam =

Italian painter

Girolamo Odam (1681 – after 1718) was an Italian painter of the Baroque period. He was renowned as a pastel portraitist and landscape artist, as well as wood engraver.

== Biography ==
Born in Rome to a family from Lorraine, he trained under Carlo Maratta and Pier Leone Ghezzi. He was a member of the Academy of Arcadia, where he was known as Dorindo Nonacrino, and was well versed not only in art but also philosophy and mathematics, which he had studied under Giordano Vitale.

Odam was also a well known antiquarian, and was closely connected to Cardinals Pietro Ottoboni and Alessandro Albani, patrons of the arts and collectors of ancient artifacts. He was a close collaborator of Philipp von Stosch – one of the leading antiquarians of the first half of the 18th century.
