= Nicolas Baudesson =

French painter

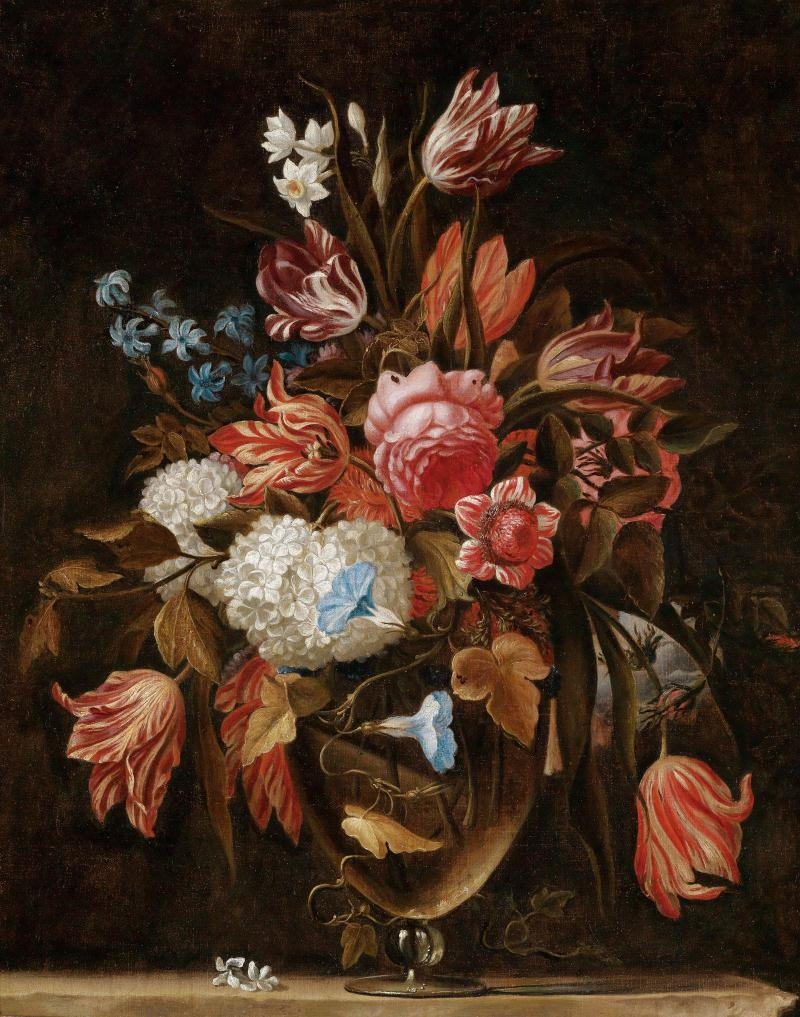
Bouquet of Flowers in a Crystal Vase

Nicolas Baudesson, a French flower painter, was born in Troyes in 1611, and was admitted into the Académie royale de peinture et de sculpture on May 26, 1671. He died at Paris in 1680, leaving a son, Jean François Baudesson, born in Paris in 1640, who was also a painter of flowers and fruit. The younger Baudesson became a member of the Academy in 1689, and died in Paris in 1713. Much of his work is in the Château de Versailles.

== Works ==
- A Bouquet of Flowers from the Marcus Gallery, Musée des beaux-arts, Troyes.
- Flowers in a crystal vase, oil on canvas, 46 × 38 cm, Musée des beaux-arts, Rouen.
