= Albrecht Kauw =

Swiss painter

- Born: 26 November 1616; Strasbourg
- Died: 1681 or 1682; Bern
- Other names: Albert Koha; Albrecht Kaw
- Occupation: Painter
- Known for: Still lifes, vedute
- Spouse: Katharina Meyer

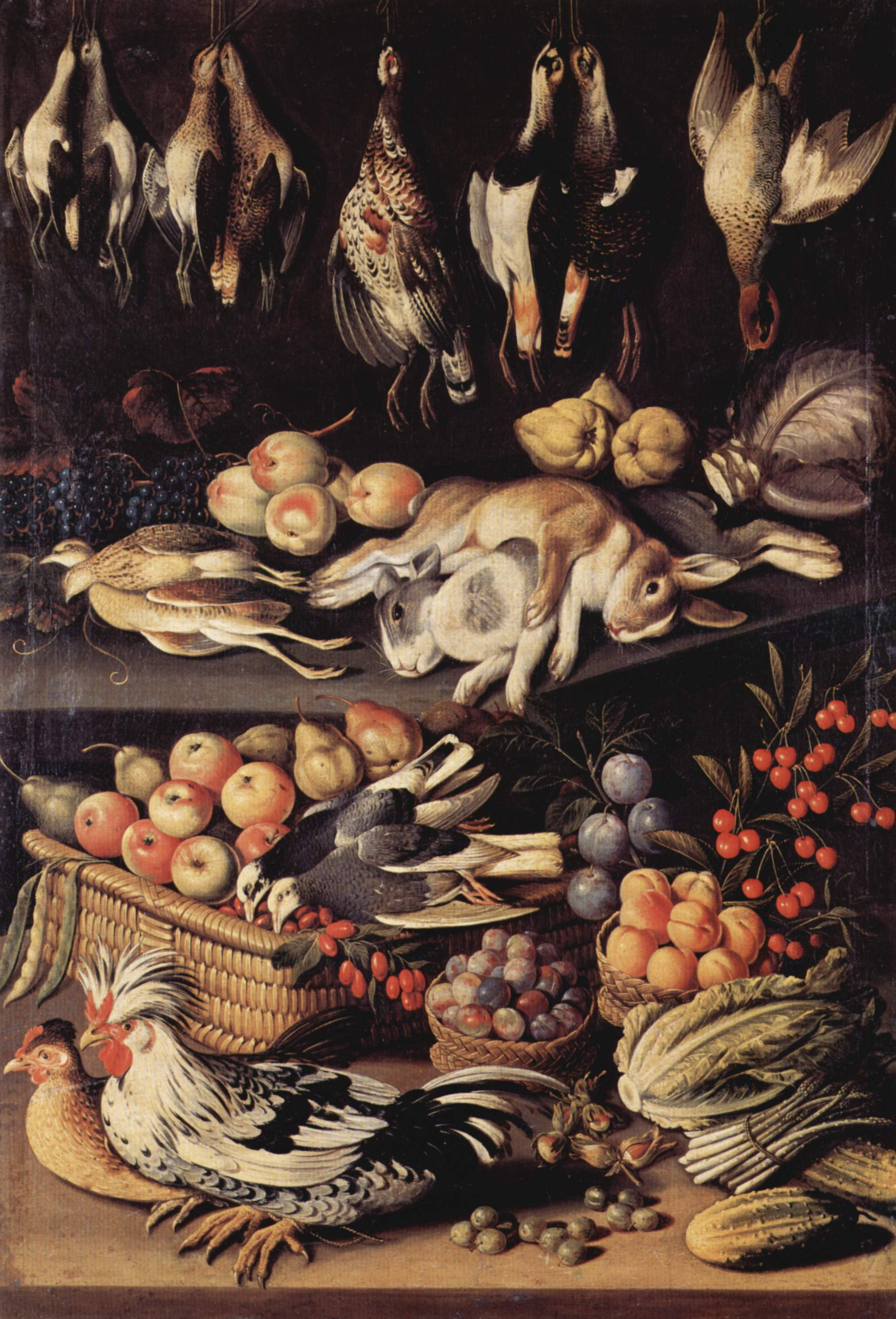
Still Life with Rooster and Hen, 1678

Albrecht Kauw (26 November 1616 – 1681 or 1682) was a painter from Strasbourg who worked mainly in Bern. He is known for still lifes and vedute, and became one of Bern’s busiest painters during the decade from 1665 to 1675. His work included large-scale still lifes, decorative programmes for Bernese castles and country houses, and watercolour vedute.

== Biography ==
Albrecht Kauw was born in Strasbourg on 26 November 1616. His father, Conrad Koha, was a wealthy wine merchant, and his mother was Anna-Maria Volmar. His ancestors were Huguenot refugees who had settled in Strasbourg after leaving Eupen in the late 16th century.

Kauw probably grew up in Strasbourg. Little is known with certainty about his artistic training, but his early artistic development has been associated with the circles of Georg Brentel and Sebastian Stoskopff. In the late 1630s, he moved to Bern, possibly during an itinerant phase of his career and in connection with the Thirty Years’ War. He was first recorded in Bern in 1639.

Kauw married Katharina Meyer of Zofingen, probably shortly before his arrival in Bern. He paid the city’s entry fee in 1643, but he did not become a citizen of Bern and remained a non-citizen resident there for the rest of his life. Baptismal records show that he and his family spent most of their lives in Bern, where eleven of his children were baptised between 1640 and 1658.

In 1649, Kauw made twenty-four watercolour and gouache copies of Niklaus Manuel’s Dance of Death in Bern’s Dominican monastery, shortly before the original was destroyed. He presented the copies to the Bernese council and was subsequently given further public commissions. In 1666, the Bernese authorities granted him the right to sell engravings and paintings. During the decade from 1665 to 1675, he became one of Bern’s busiest painters. His last dated works are from 1678. He died in Bern in 1681 or 1682.

== Work ==
Kauw worked mainly as a painter of still lifes and vedute in the Bern region. He produced decorative programmes for Bernese castles and country houses. His wider output included family trees, coats of arms, allegories, and group and individual portraits.

In the 1650s, Kauw’s still lifes became the main focus of his work. These were made for private patrons, many of them wealthy Bernese owners of country estates. For dining rooms in Bernese country houses, he painted hunting, vegetable and fruit still lifes, sometimes on a large scale. These works showed local cultivated plants and everyday foods.

Between 1665 and 1675, Kauw received major commissions for the decoration of castles and country houses. During the same period, he produced most of the eighty-six watercolour vedute and numerous coats of arms for Victor von Erlach’s Ämter-, Regiments- und Geschlechterbuch. Works by Kauw are held by institutions including the Bern Historical Museum and Kunstmuseum Bern.

== Gallery ==
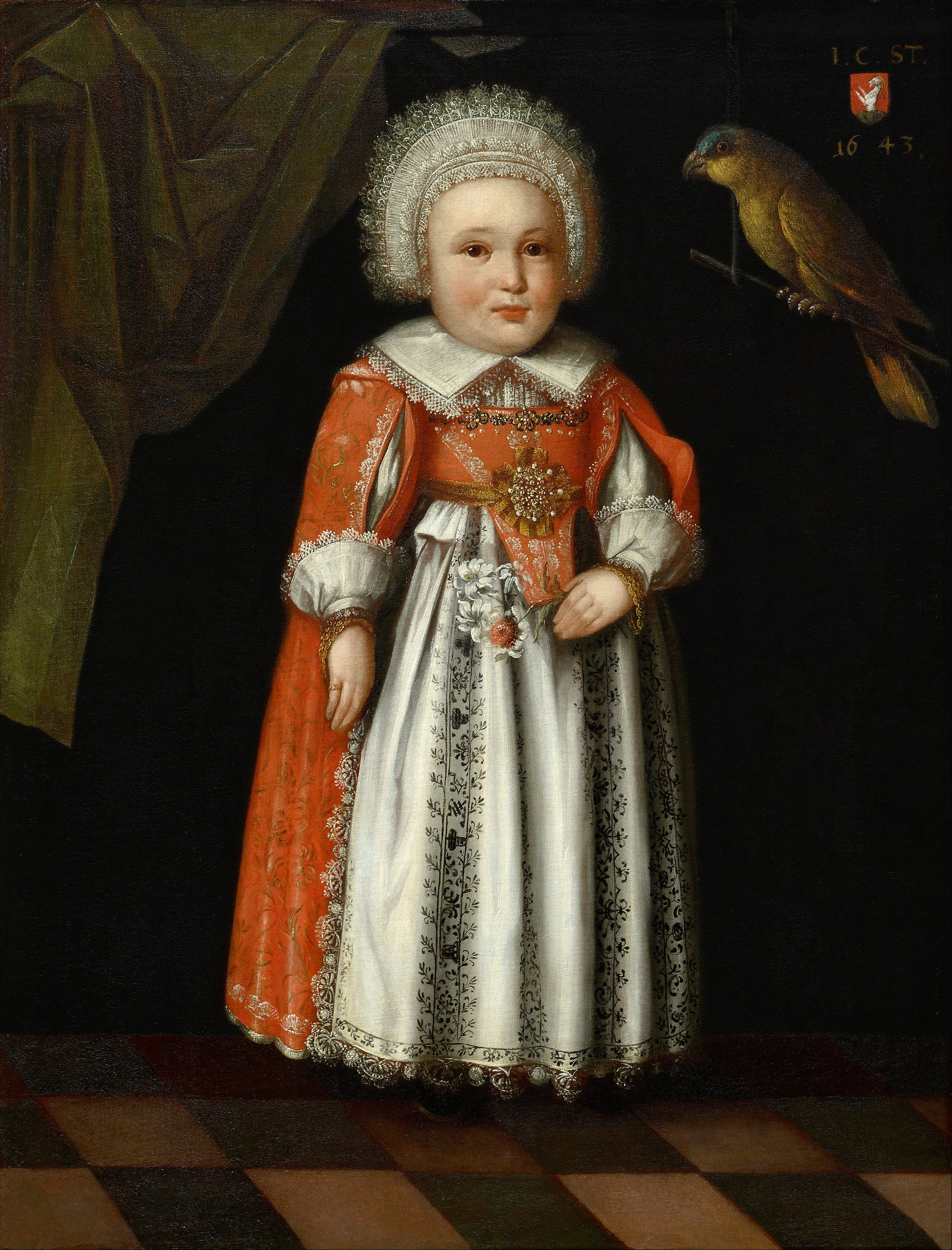
Johanna Katharina Steiger, Aged 2, 1643

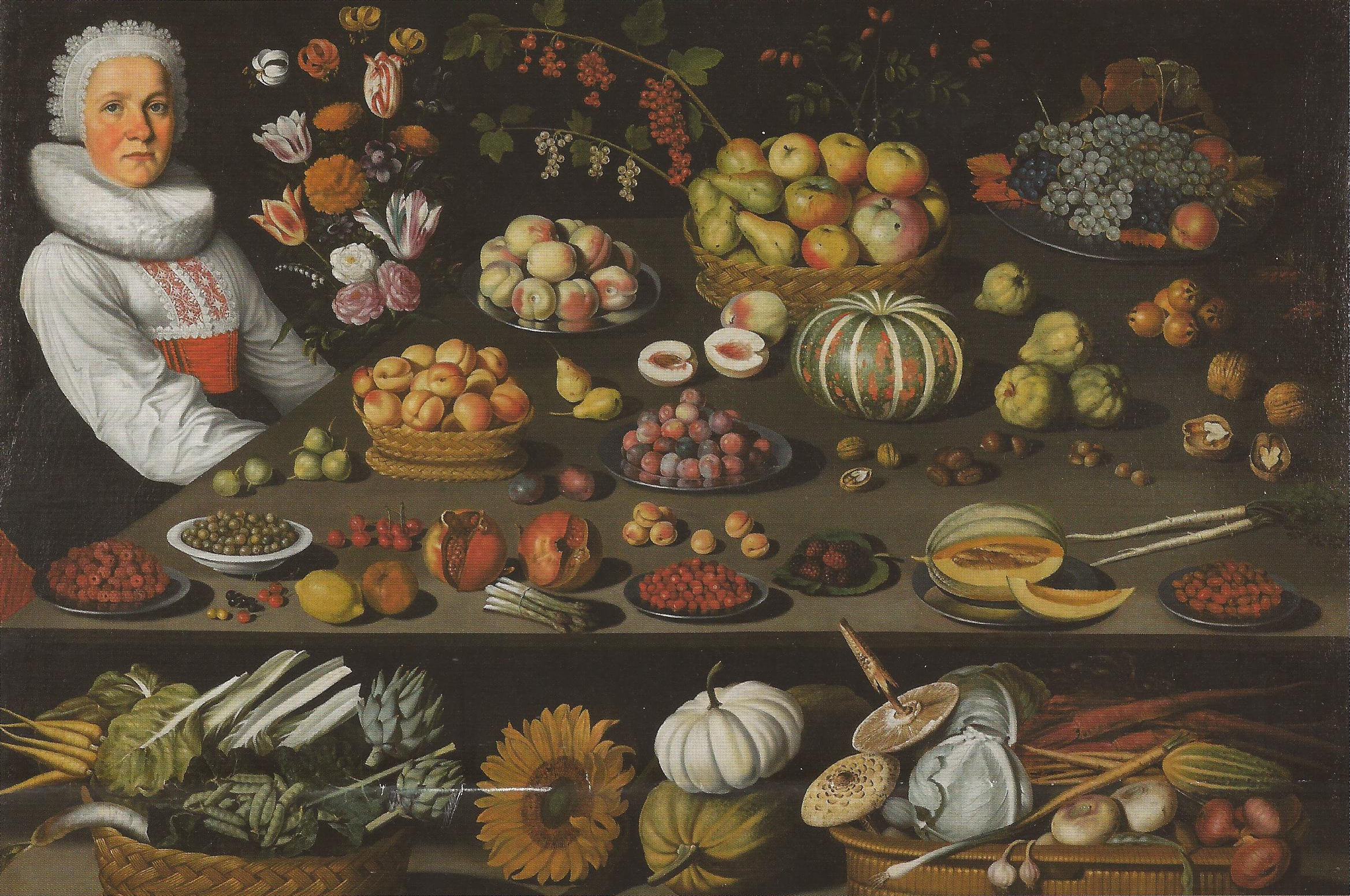
Large Still Life with Seated Woman, c. 1662 – c. 1664

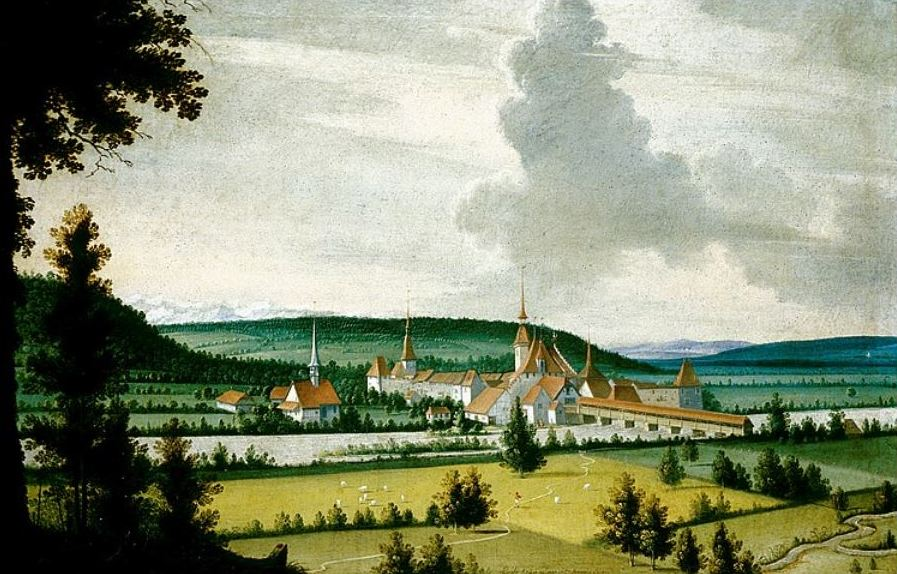
Wangen an der Aare, 1664
