= Giovanni Battista Bolognini =

Italian painter (1611–1688)

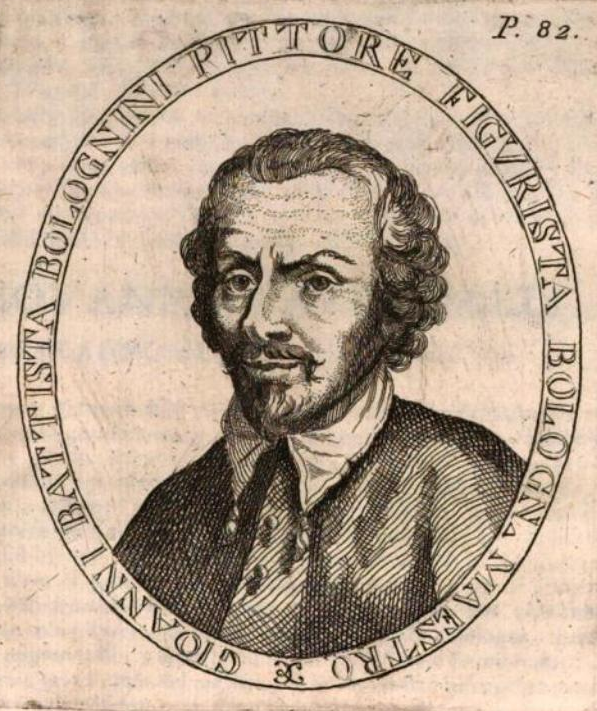
Giovanni Battista Bolognini

Giovanni Battista Bolognini (1611 in Bologna – 1688 in Bologna) was an Italian painter and engraver of the Baroque.

He was a pupil of Guido Reni. He painted a Virgin and child with St Dominic, St Eustatius, and Mary Magdalene for Santa Maria Nuova. He painted a Dead Christ mourned by the Virgin, St. John, and others; an Immaculate Conception for the church of Santa Lucia. He etched a Murder of the Innocents, a St Peter named Head of the Church; a Bacchus and Ariadne; and The Crucifixion after Reni.

He was an uncle and teacher of the Bolognese painter Giacomo Bolognini.
