= 1616 in art =

Events from the year 1616 in art.

== Events ==
- Jacob Jordaens marries the daughter of his teacher, Adam van Noort.
- Peter Paul Rubens begins work on classical tapestries for Genoese merchant Franco Cattaneo following signing of a contract in Antwerp with cloth dyers Jan Raes and Frans Sweerts.

== Paintings ==
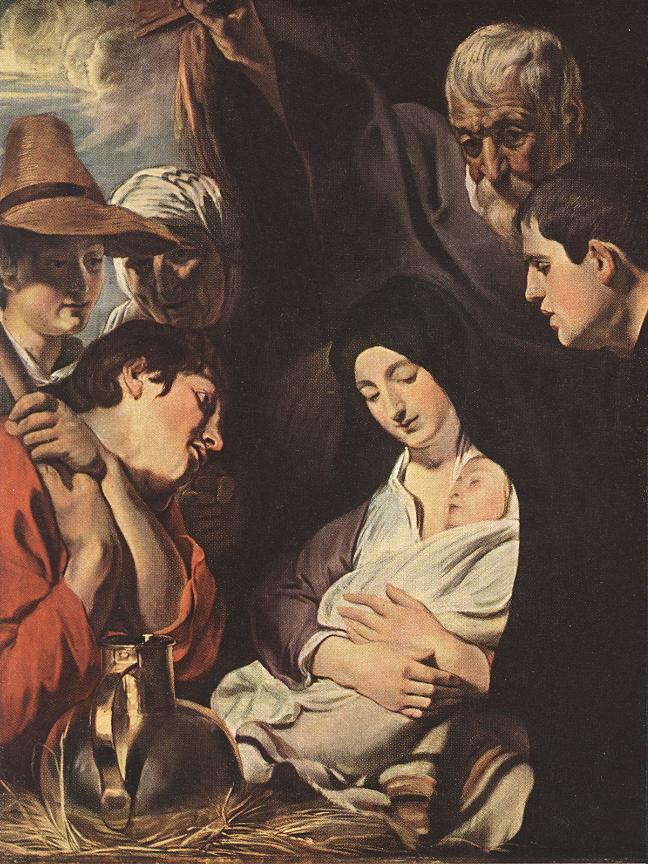
Jordaens – Adoration of the Shepherds, Mauritshuis

- Hendrik Goltzius - Lot and his Daughters
- Guercino - Moonlit Landscape
- Cornelis van Haarlem – Allegory of Vanity and Repentance
- Frans Hals - The Banquet of the Officers of the St George Militia Company
- Jacob Jordaens
  - Abduction of Europa (1615-16)
  - Adoration of the Shepherds (his earliest dated extant work)
  - The Return of the Holy Family from Egypt (approximate date)
- Isaac Oliver - Portrait miniature of John Donne
- Peter Paul Rubens
  - Erichthonius discovered by the daughters of Cecrops (approximate date)
  - The Hippopotamus and Crocodile Hunt
  - Tiger, Lion and Leopard Hunt
  - Portrait of a Young Girl
  - Romulus and Remus
- Sigismund of Seeon - Trithemius sui ipsius vindex sive Steganographiae (painted in Ingolstadt)
- Simon van de Passe - Engraving of Pocahontas (died 1617; later published in John Smith's Generall Historie of Virginia (1624))

== Sculptures ==
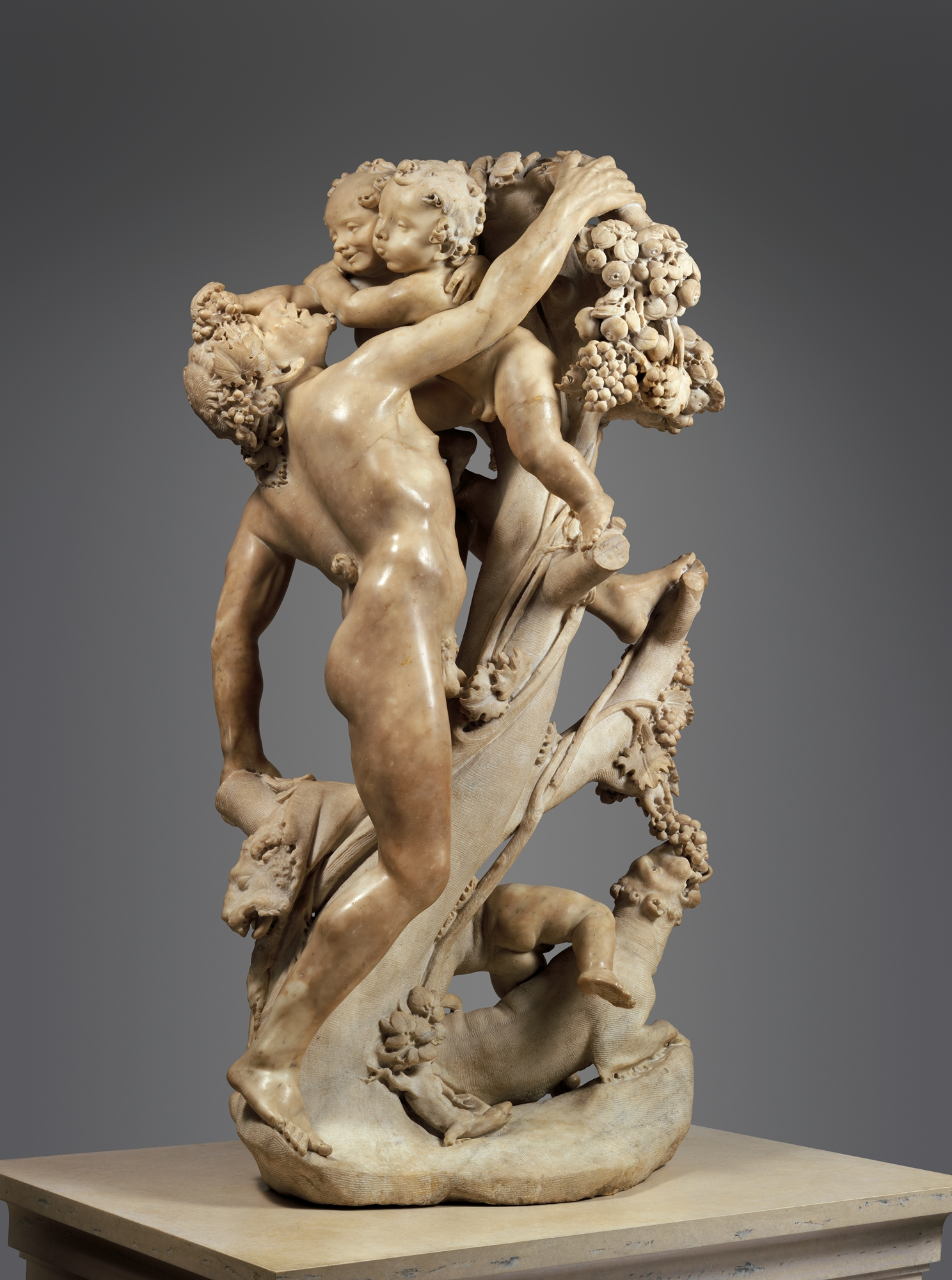
Bernini's Bacchanal: A Faun Teased by Children

- Gian Lorenzo Bernini
  - Bacchanal: A Faun Teased by Children
  - Bust of Giovanni Battista Santoni (approximate completion date)
- Pietro Bernini - Flora
- Pietro and Gian Lorenzo Bernini - Autumn (approximate date)
- Giambologna (completed by Pietro Tacca) - Equestrian statue of Philip III of Spain

== Births ==
- February 2 - Sébastien Bourdon, French painter and engraver (died 1671)
- May 25 - Carlo Dolci, Italian painter of chiefly sacred subjects (died 1686)
- June 24 - Ferdinand Bol, Dutch artist, etcher, and draftsman (died 1680)
- September - Philips Angel, Dutch painter (died 1683)
- date unknown
  - Bernardo Cavallino, Italian painter of the Baroque period working in Naples (died 1656)
  - Pierfrancesco Cittadini, Italian painter of still life (died 1681)
  - Pietro del Po, Italian painter (died 1692)
  - Isaack Luttichuys, Dutch Golden Age portrait painter (died 1673)
  - Jean Michelin, French Protestant painter (died 1670)
  - Luigi Pellegrini Scaramuccia, Italian painter and artist biographer of the Baroque period (died 1680)
  - Sokuhi Nyoitsu, Buddhist monk of the Obaku Zen sect, poet and calligrapher (died 1671)
- Henri Testelin, French court painter (died 1695)
- (born 1616/1617) Caesar van Everdingen – Dutch portrait painter (died 1678)

== Deaths ==
- January - Orazio Borgianni, Italian painter and etcher of the Mannerist and early-baroque periods (born 1575)
- August 8 - Cornelis Ketel, Dutch Mannerist painter (born 1548)
- date unknown
  - Matteo Perez d'Aleccio, Italian painter of devotional, historical and maritime subjects during the Mannerist period (born c.1547)
  - Jacques Bellange, French artist and printmaker from Lorraine (born 1575)
  - Orazio Farinati, Italian Mannerist painter (born 1559)
  - Felipe Guaman Poma de Ayala, Quechua noble man known for illustrating a chronicle of the native peoples of the Andes (born 1535)
  - Siyâvash, Iranian Georgian miniature illustrator (born 1536)
