= 1607 in art =

Events from the year 1607 in art.

== Events ==
- Work by the German painter Peter Reimers first appears in Kinsarvik, effectively beginning the Stavanger renaissance.

== Paintings ==
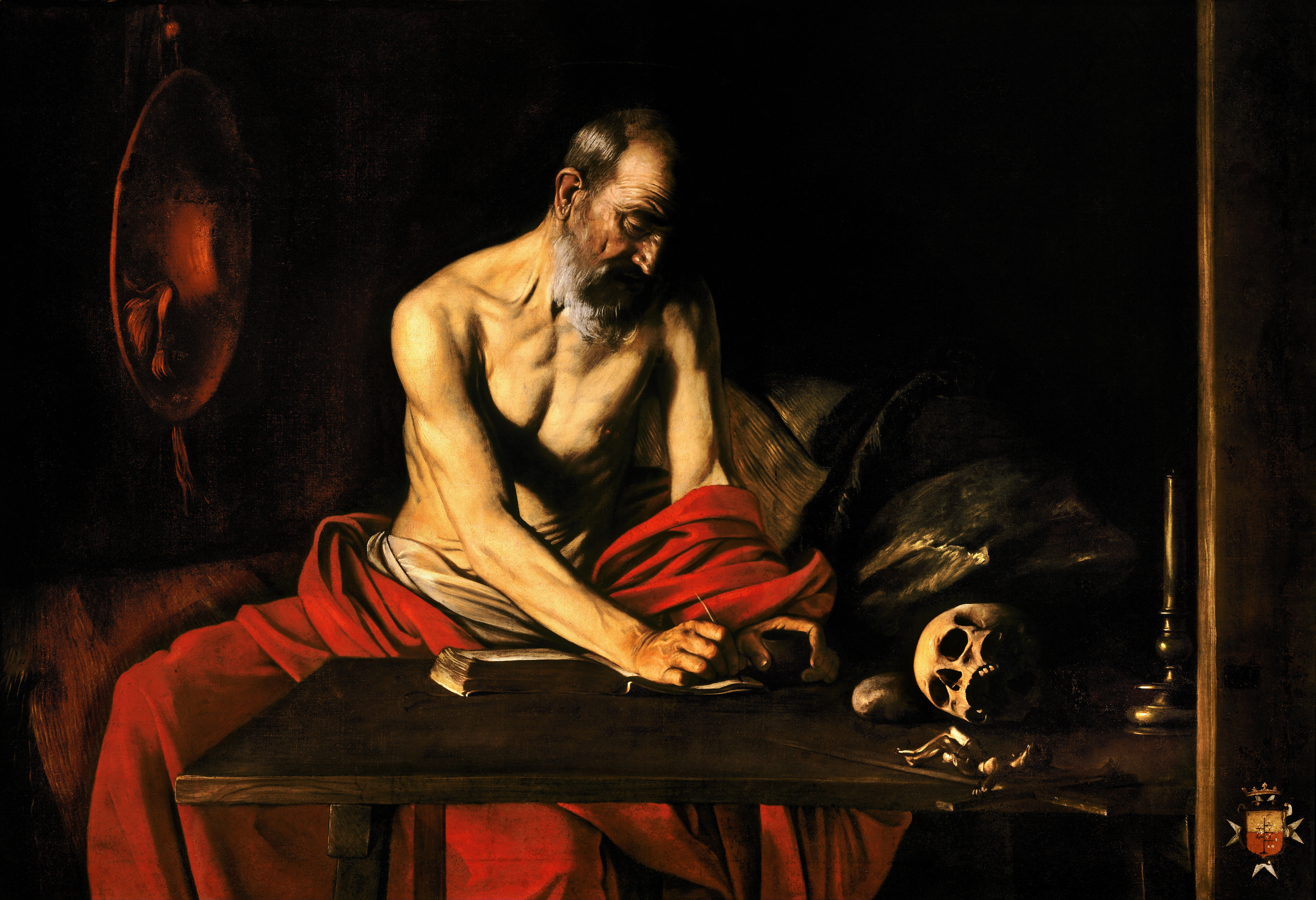
Caravaggio, Saint Jerome Writing

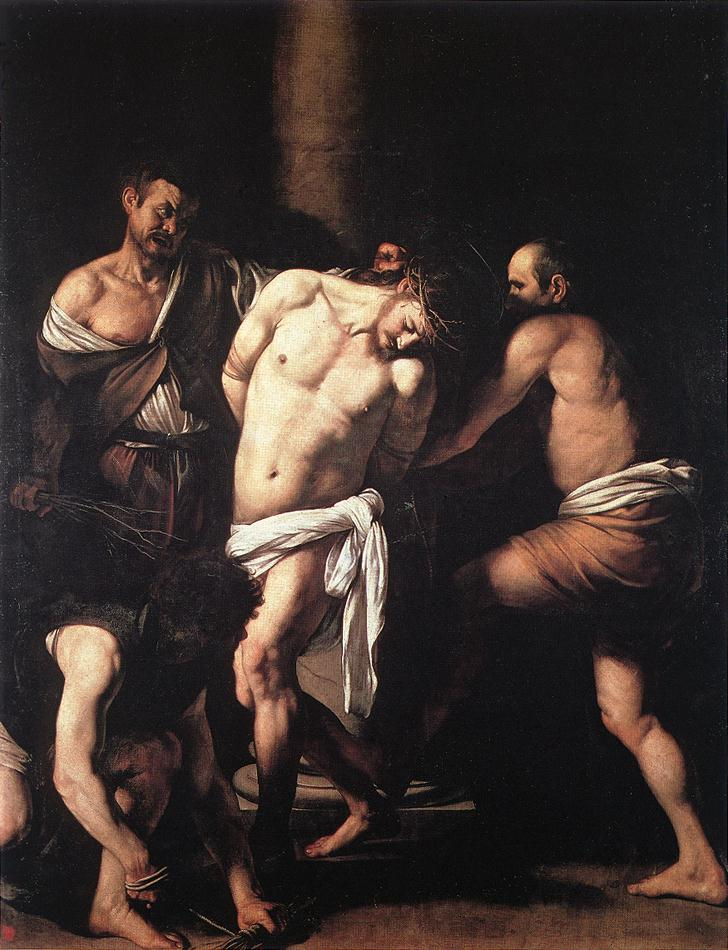
Caravaggio, Flagellation of Christ

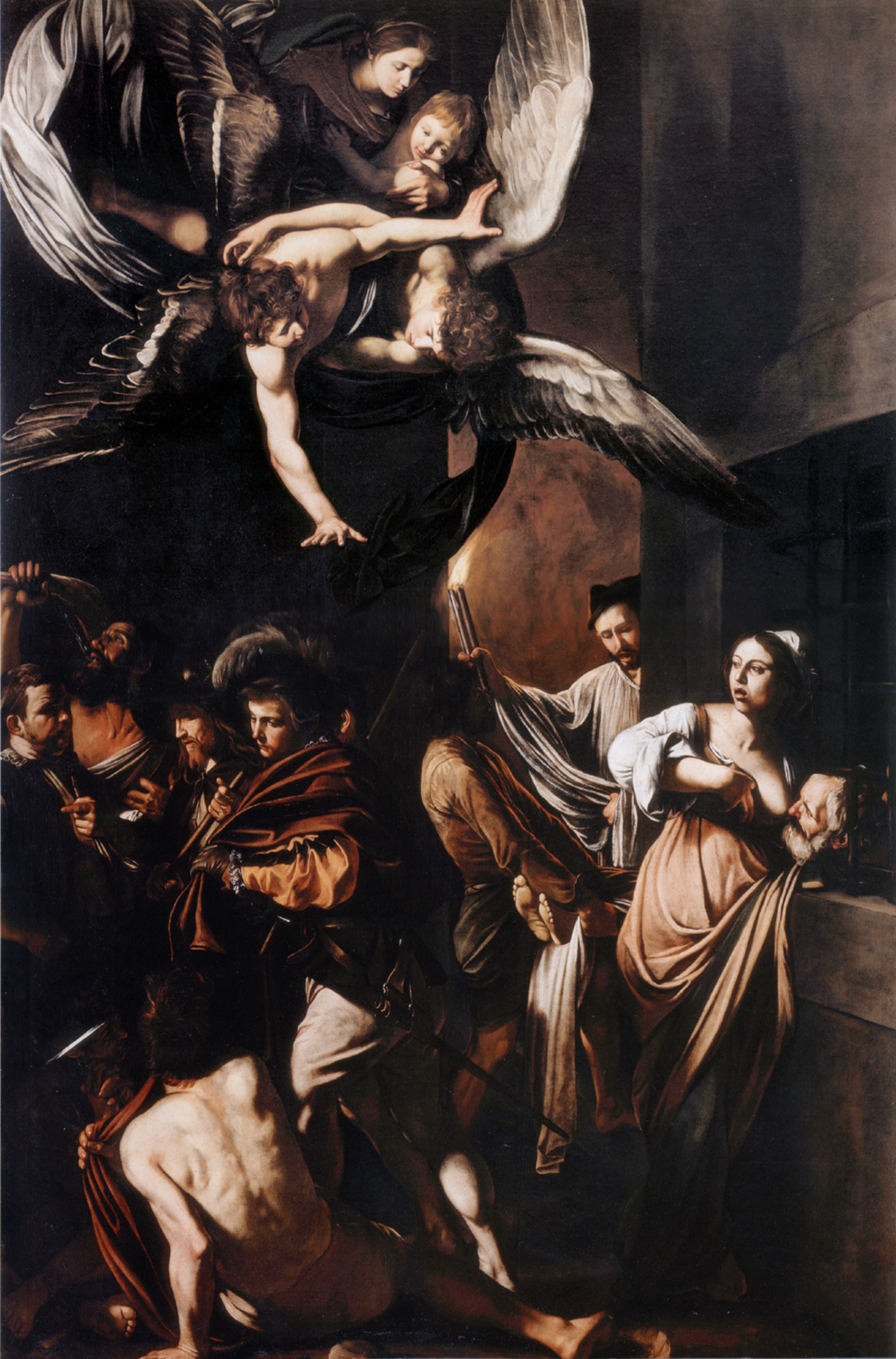
Caravaggio, The Seven Works of Mercy

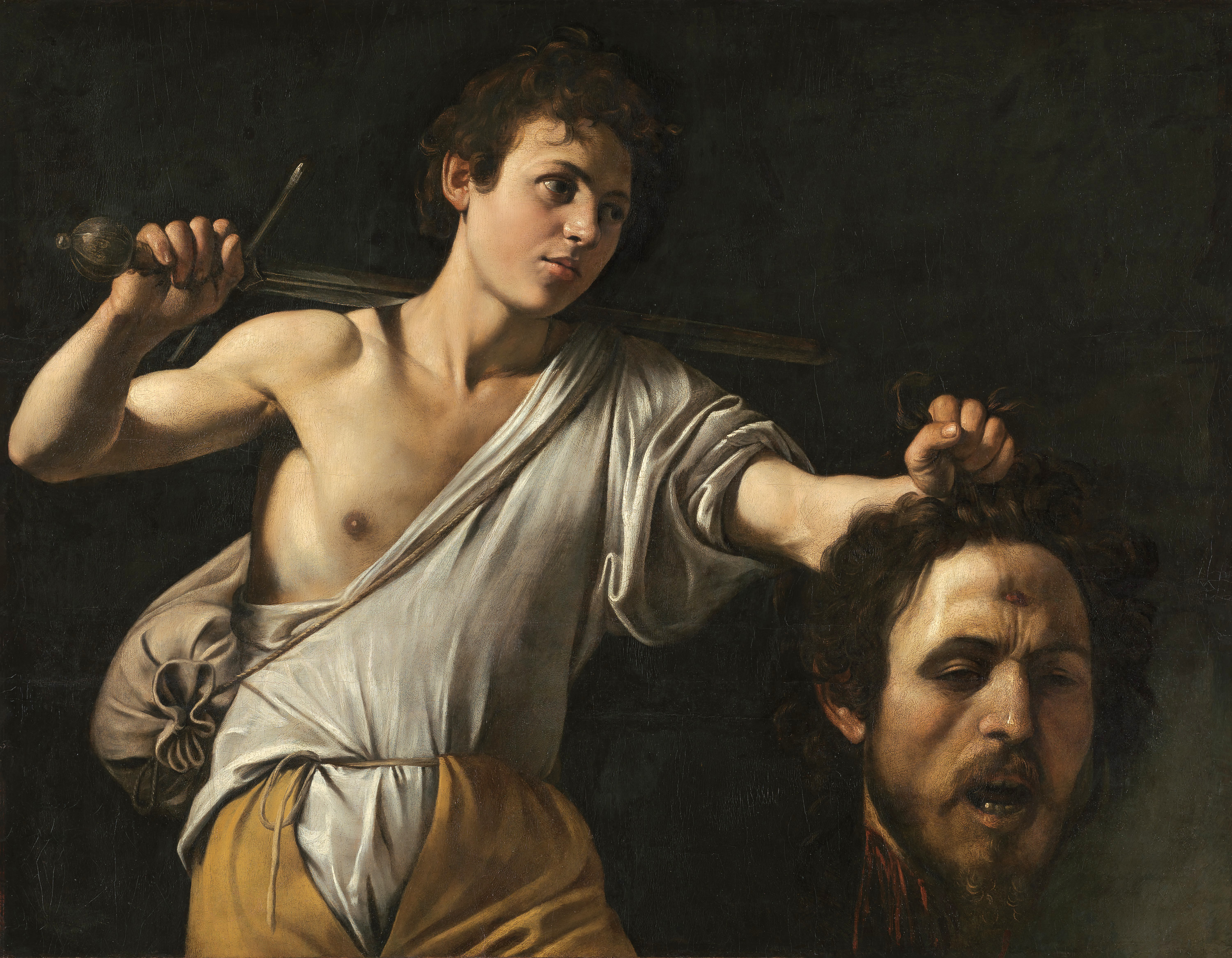
Caravaggio, David with the Head of Goliath

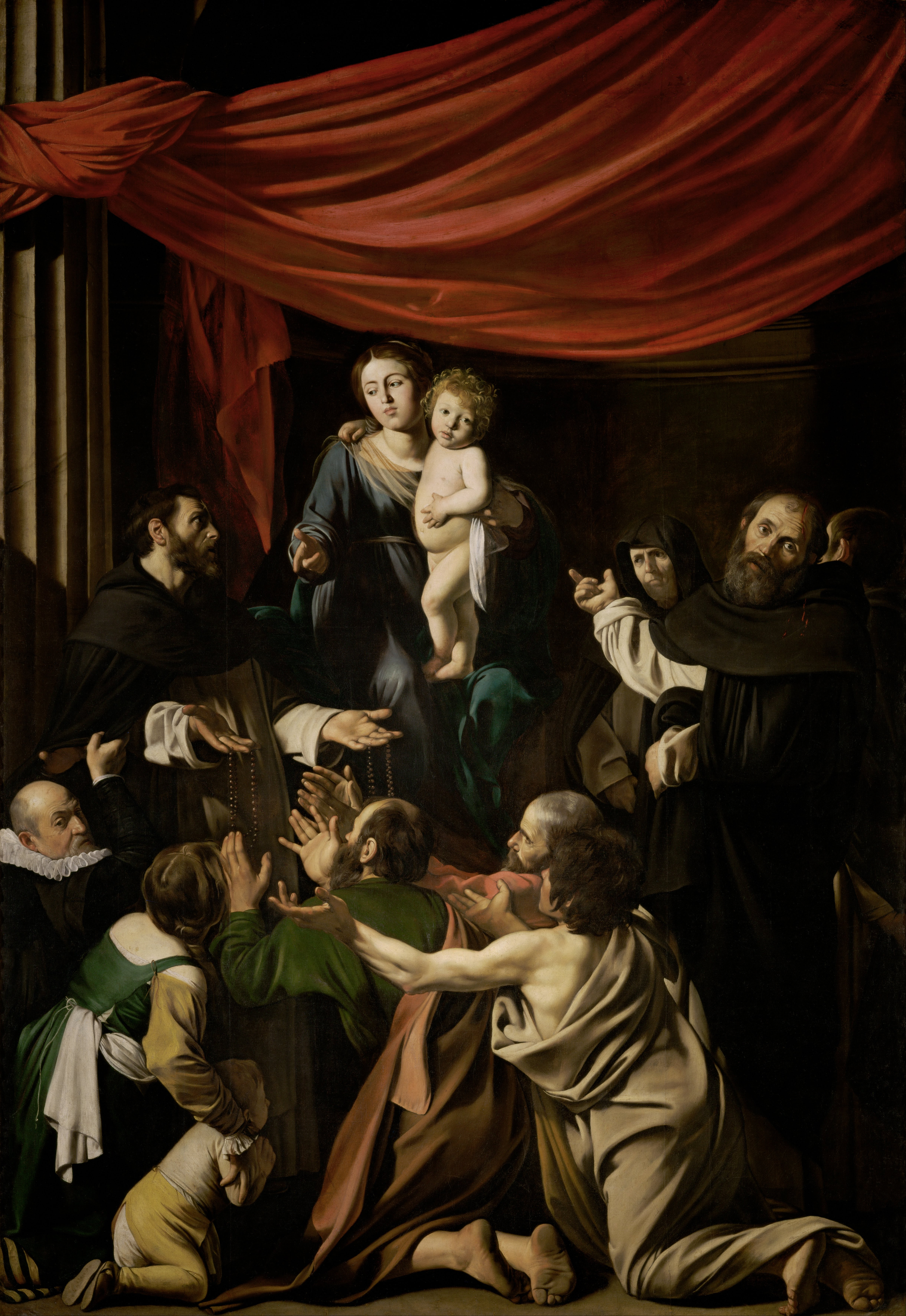
Caravaggio, Madonna of the Rosary

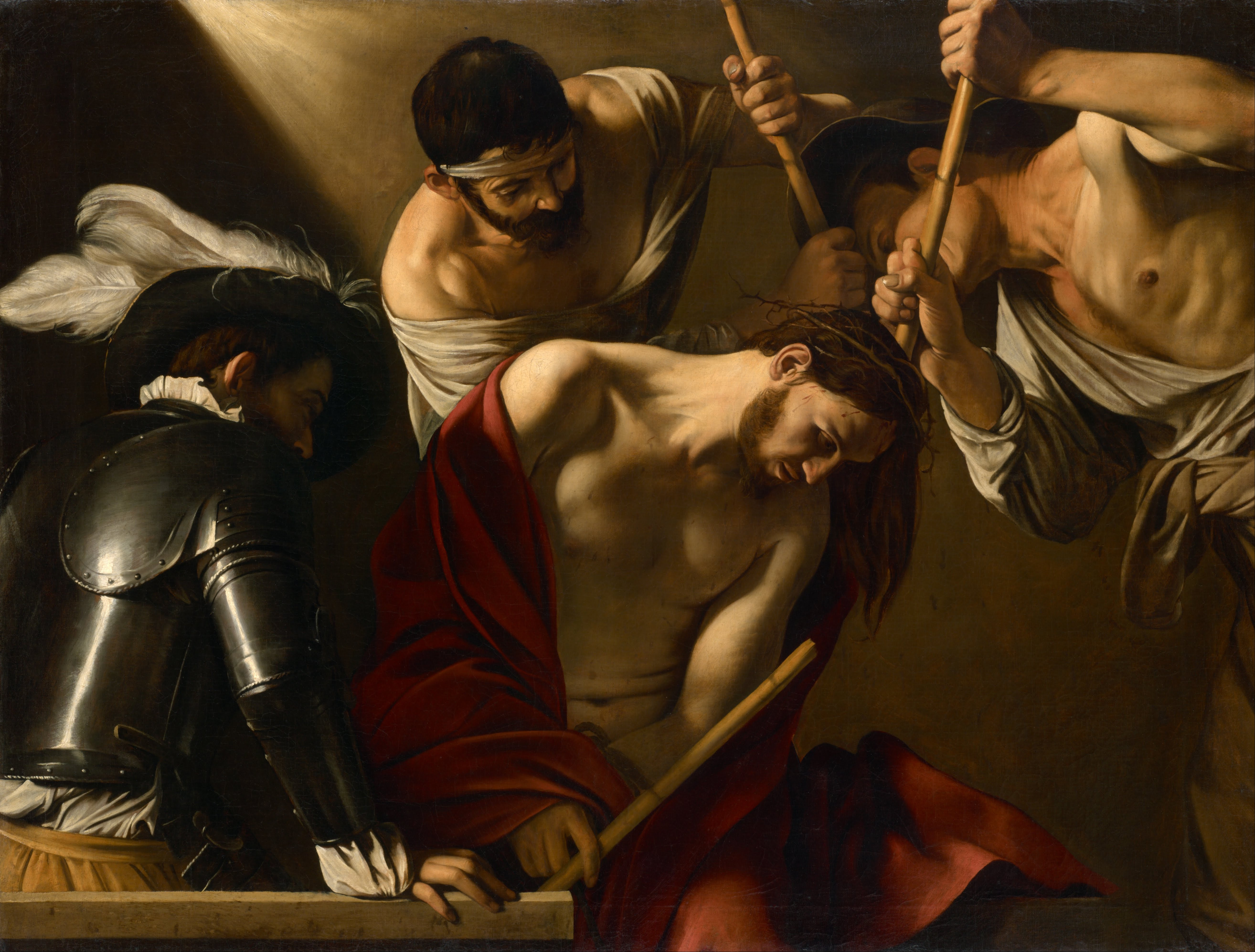
Caravaggio, The Crowning with Thorns

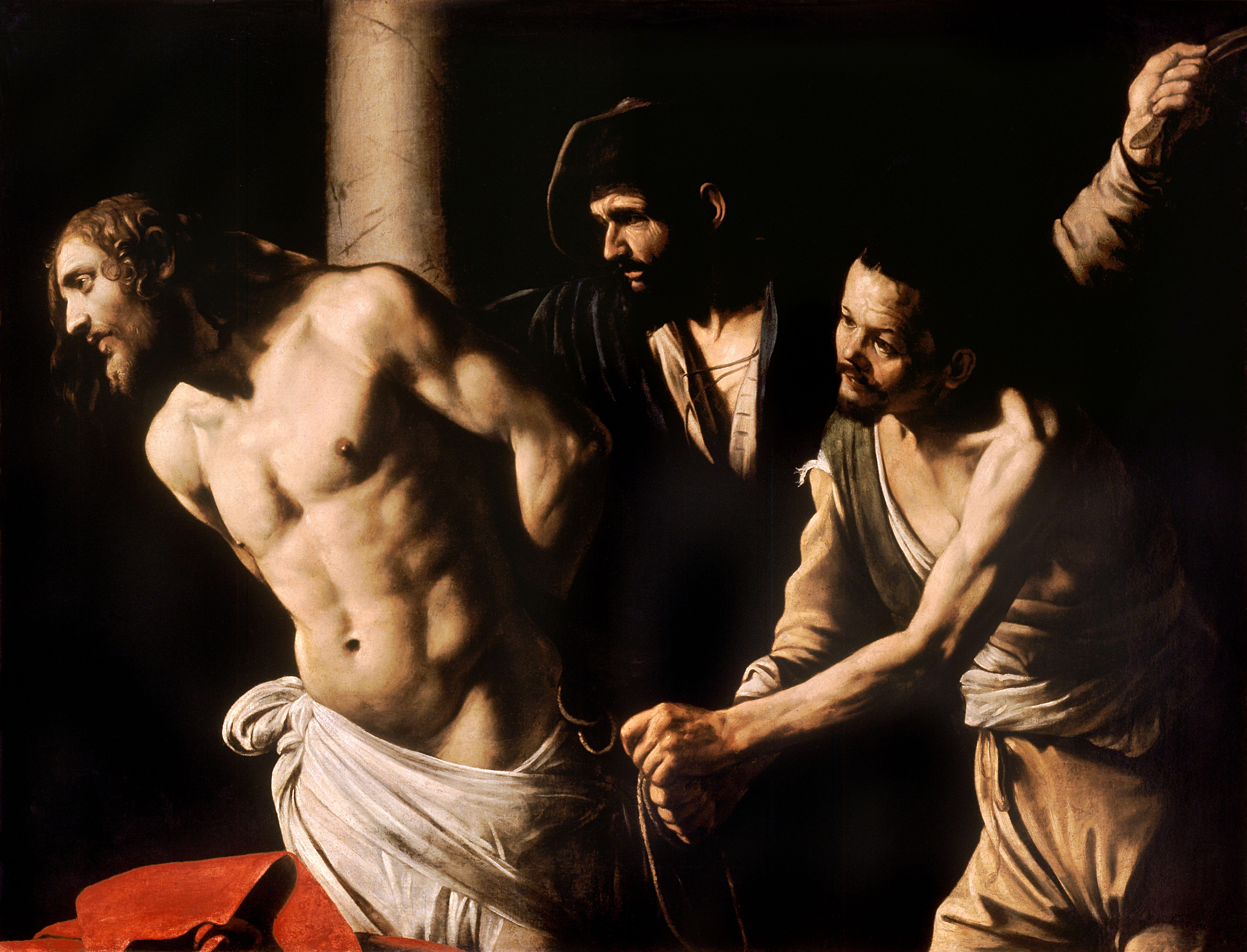
Caravaggio, Christ at the Column

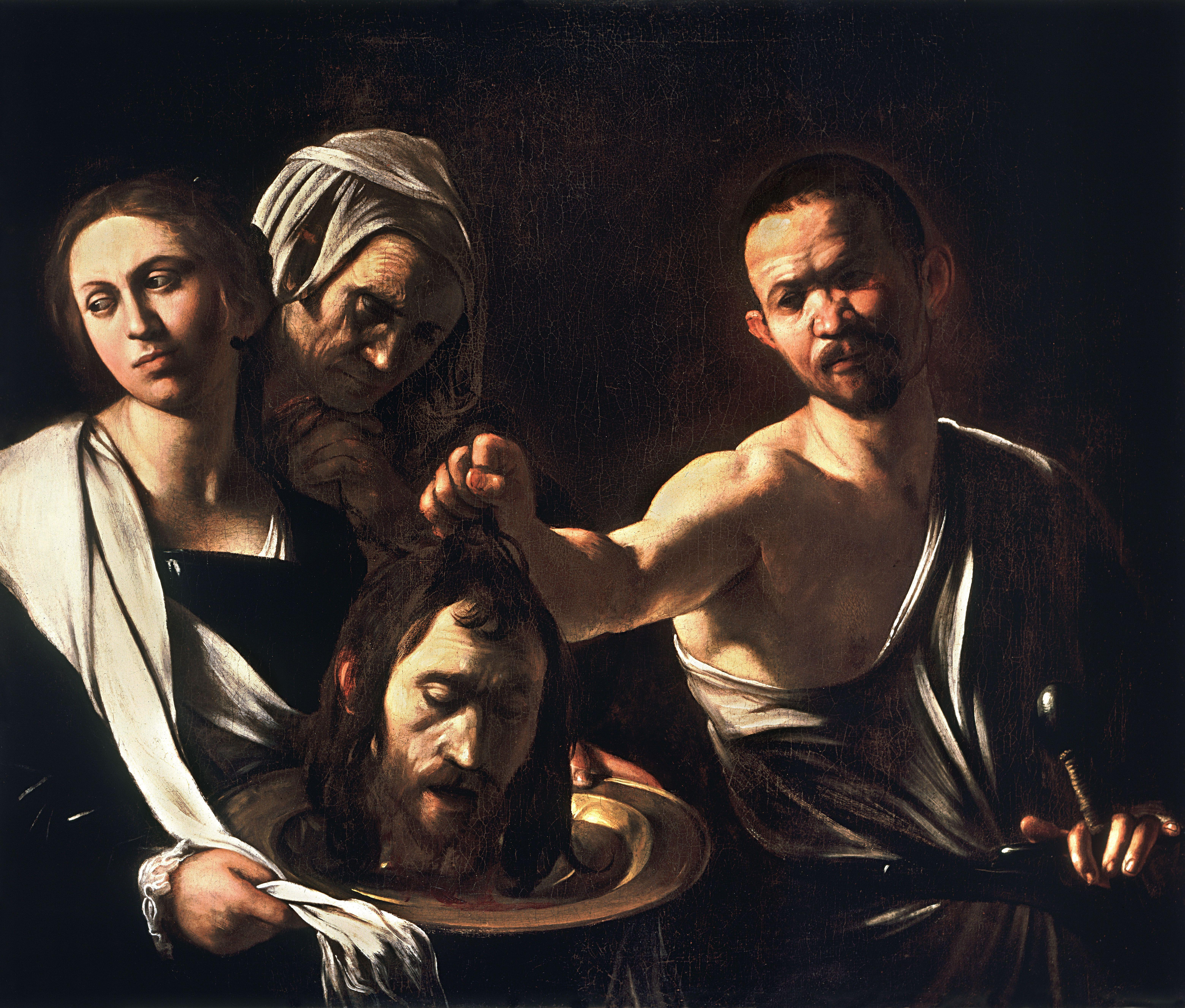
Caravaggio, Salome with the Head of John the Baptist
- Caravaggio
  - Saint Jerome Writing
  - The Flagellation of Christ
  - The Crucifixion of Saint Andrew
  - The Seven Works of Mercy
  - David with the Head of Goliath (Kunsthistorisches Museum, Vienna)
  - Madonna of the Rosary
  - The Crowning with Thorns
  - Christ at the Column
  - Salome with the Head of John the Baptist (National Gallery, London)
- Cigoli - The Sacrifice of Isaac (approximate date)
- Ambrosius Francken - triptych of the Crucifixion (formerly at main altar of Church of the Augustinians in Mechelen)
- Peter Paul Rubens - Susanna and the Elders

== Births ==
- May 31 - Johann Wilhelm Baur, German engraver, etcher and miniature painter (died 1640)
- July 12 - Jean Petitot, French-Swiss enamel painter (died 1691)
- July 23 - Wenceslaus Hollar, Bohemian etcher (died 1677)
- October 24 – Jan Lievens (died 1674), Dutch painter and visual artist
- specific date not listed
  - Hendrick Andriessen, Flemish still-life painter (died 1655)
  - Bartholomeus Assteyn, Dutch painter (died 1669/1677)
  - Francesco Cairo, Italian painter active in Lombardy and Piedmont (died 1665)
  - Vincenzo Dandini, Italian painter active in Florence (died 1675)
  - Frans Francken III, Flemish painter (died 1667)
  - Mathieu Le Nain ("le Chevalier") (died 1677) of the Le Nain brothers, French Baroque painter
  - Alfonso Rivarola, Italian painter, active mainly in his native Ferrara (died 1640)
  - Cornelis Saftleven, Dutch painter (died 1681)
  - Gerard van Zyl, Dutch Golden Age painter of portraits and genre scenes (died 1665)

== Deaths ==
- January - Gillis van Coninxloo, Dutch painter of forest landscapes (born 1544)
- March - Étienne Dupérac, French painter, draughtsman and engraver, topographer and antiquarian (born 1520)
- April 6 - Jan Saenredam, Dutch engraver (born 1565)
- May 10 - Pieter Schoubroeck, German landscape painter (born c.1570)
- July 24 - Alessandro Pieroni, Italian mannerist painter and architect (born 1550)
- September 22 - Alessandro Allori, Italian portrait painter of the late Mannerist Florentine school (born 1535)
- date unknown - Cornelius Cure, English-born sculptor of Dutch parentage
- probable - Barthel Bruyn the Younger, German portraitist, son of Barthel Bruyn the Elder (born 1530)
