= Salome with the Head of John the Baptist (Caravaggio, London) =

Painting by Caravaggio

- Salomè con testa del Battista (Italian)
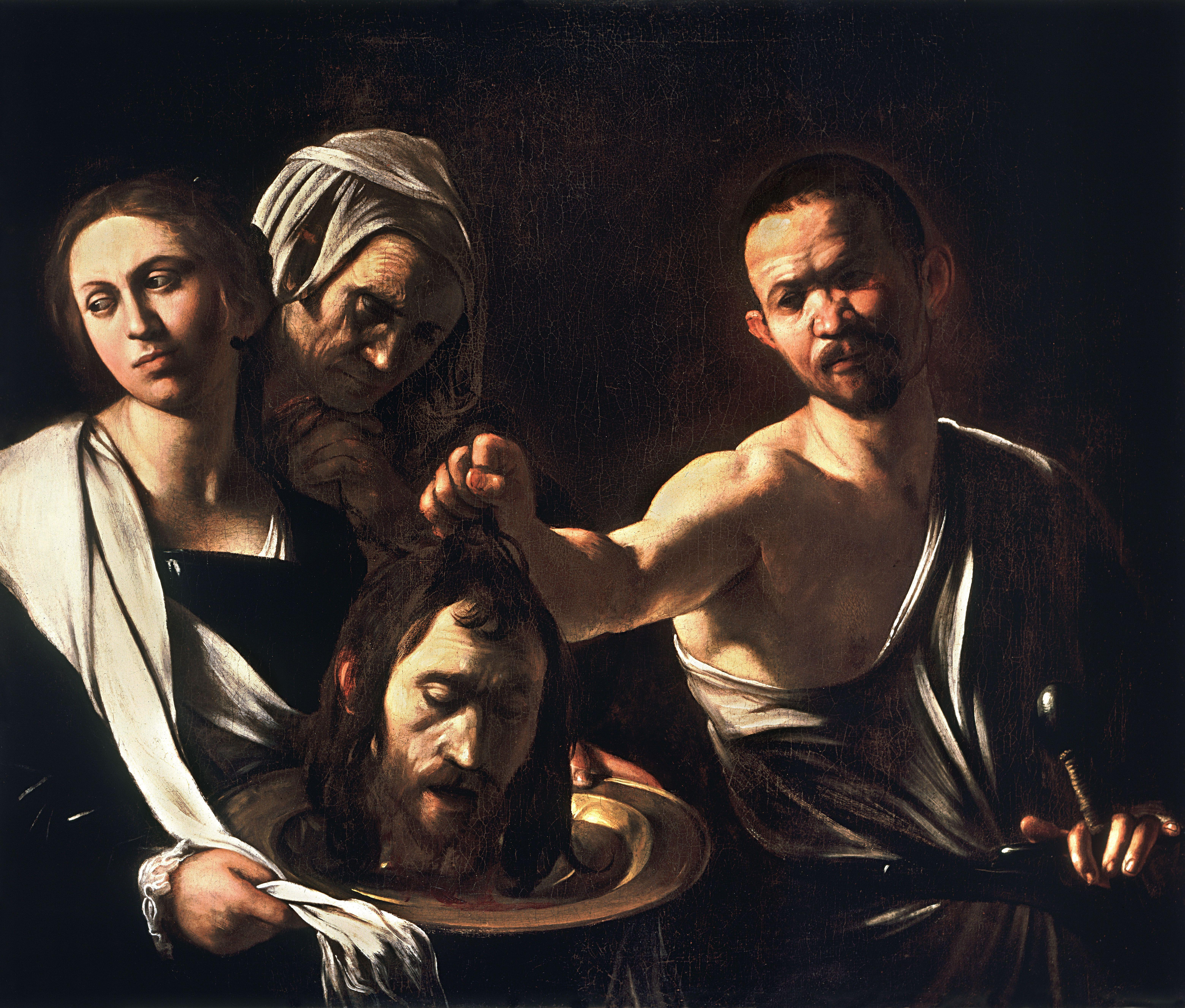
- Artist: Caravaggio
- Year: c. 1607
- Medium: Oil on canvas
- Dimensions: 91.5 cm × 106.7 cm (36.0 in × 42.0 in)
- Location: National Gallery, London

Salome with the Head of John the Baptist is an oil-on-canvas painting by the Italian master Caravaggio, from c. 1607. It is held in the collection of the National Gallery in London.

== History ==
The painting depicts the biblical Salome receiving the head of John the Baptist. It was discovered in a private collection in 1959. Alfred Ernest Allnatt acquired it in 1961 and lent it to the National Gallery; after his death, the Gallery purchased it from Allnatt's estate.

The early Caravaggio biographer Giovanni Bellori, writing in 1673, mentions a Salome with the Head of John the Baptist sent by the artist to the Grand Master of the Knights of Malta in the hope of regaining favour after having been expelled from the Order in 1608. It seems likely, however, that Bellori was referring to a different painting by Caravaggio of the same subject (see Salome with the Head of John the Baptist at the Royal Palace of Madrid). The handling and the raking light link this painting to works done in Naples during the artist's brief stay in the city during 1606–1607, an impression confirmed by the balances between Salome and the Virgin in the Madonna of the Rosary, and between the executioner holding the head of the Baptist and one of the two torturers in Christ at the Column and The Flagellation of Christ.

From November to February 2012 – 2013, this painting was part of the exhibition "Bodies and Shadows: Caravaggio and His Legacy" at the Los Angeles County Museum of Art.

== See also ==
- Salome with the Head of John the Baptist (Caravaggio), Madrid
- Beheading of Saint John the Baptist
- List of paintings by Caravaggio
