= Flagellation of Christ =

Biblical episode from the Passion of Jesus

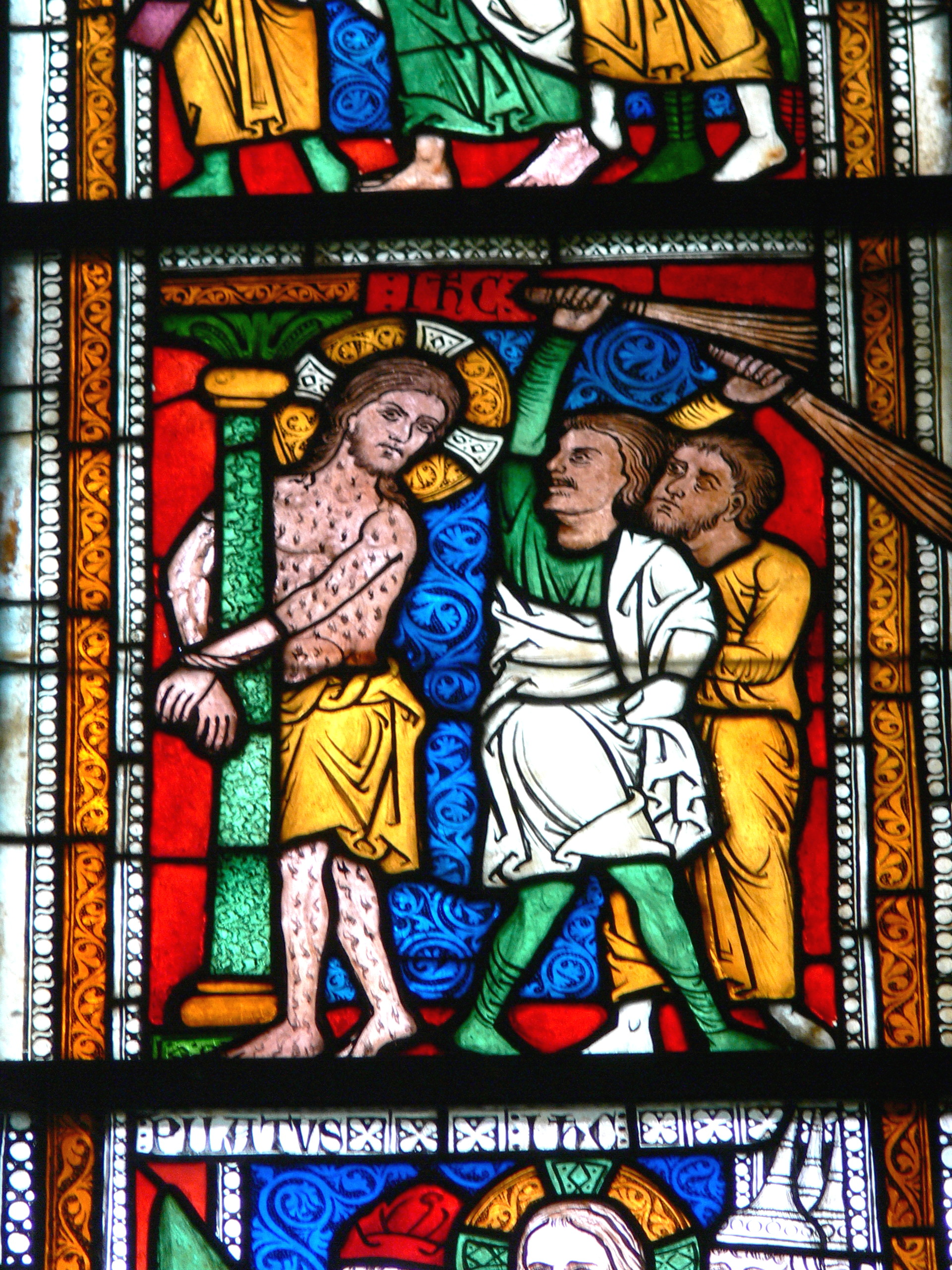
Stained glass from Dalhem Church, Sweden (c. 1240)

The Flagellation of Christ, in art sometimes known as Christ at the Column or the Scourging at the Pillar, is an episode from the Passion of Jesus as presented in the Gospels. As such, it is frequently shown in Christian art, in cycles of the Passion or the larger subject of the Life of Christ. Catholic tradition places the Flagellation on the site of the Church of the Flagellation (the second station of the Via Dolorosa in Jerusalem). It is the second Sorrowful Mystery of the Rosary and the sixth station of John Paul II's Scriptural Way of the Cross. The column to which Christ is normally shown to be tied, and the rope, scourge, whip or birch are elements in the Arma Christi. The Basilica di Santa Prassede in Rome is one of the churches claiming to possess the original column or parts of it.

In art, the subject was first depicted as one of a series of Passion scenes, but from the 15th century onwards it was also painted in individual works. The most-discussed single work is the enigmatic Flagellation of Christ on a small panel in Urbino by Piero della Francesca (1455–1460), the precise meaning of which has eluded generations of art historians. At the same time, Christ at the Column or Christ at the Stake developed as an image of Christ alone tied to a column or stake. This was most popular in Baroque sculpture, and also related to the subject, not found in the canonical Gospels, of Christ in the Dungeon. It is often difficult to distinguish between these two subjects, and between Christ at the Column and a Flagellation.

== Gospels ==
Flagellation at the hands of the Romans is mentioned in three of the four canonical Gospels: John 19 (John 19:1), Mark 15 (Mark 15:15), and Matthew 27 (Matthew 27:26), and was the usual prelude to crucifixion under Roman law. None of the three accounts is more detailed than John's "Then Pilate took Jesus and had him flogged" (NIV). Luke's comparable account in Luke 22 (, Luke 22:63–65) is of the High Priest of Israel's guards beating and mocking Jesus. In the Passion of Christ, the episode precedes the Mocking of Christ and the Crowning with Thorns, which according to the Gospels happened at the same time or immediately afterwards. Unlike the flogging, these were not part of the normal Roman judicial process.

== Relics ==
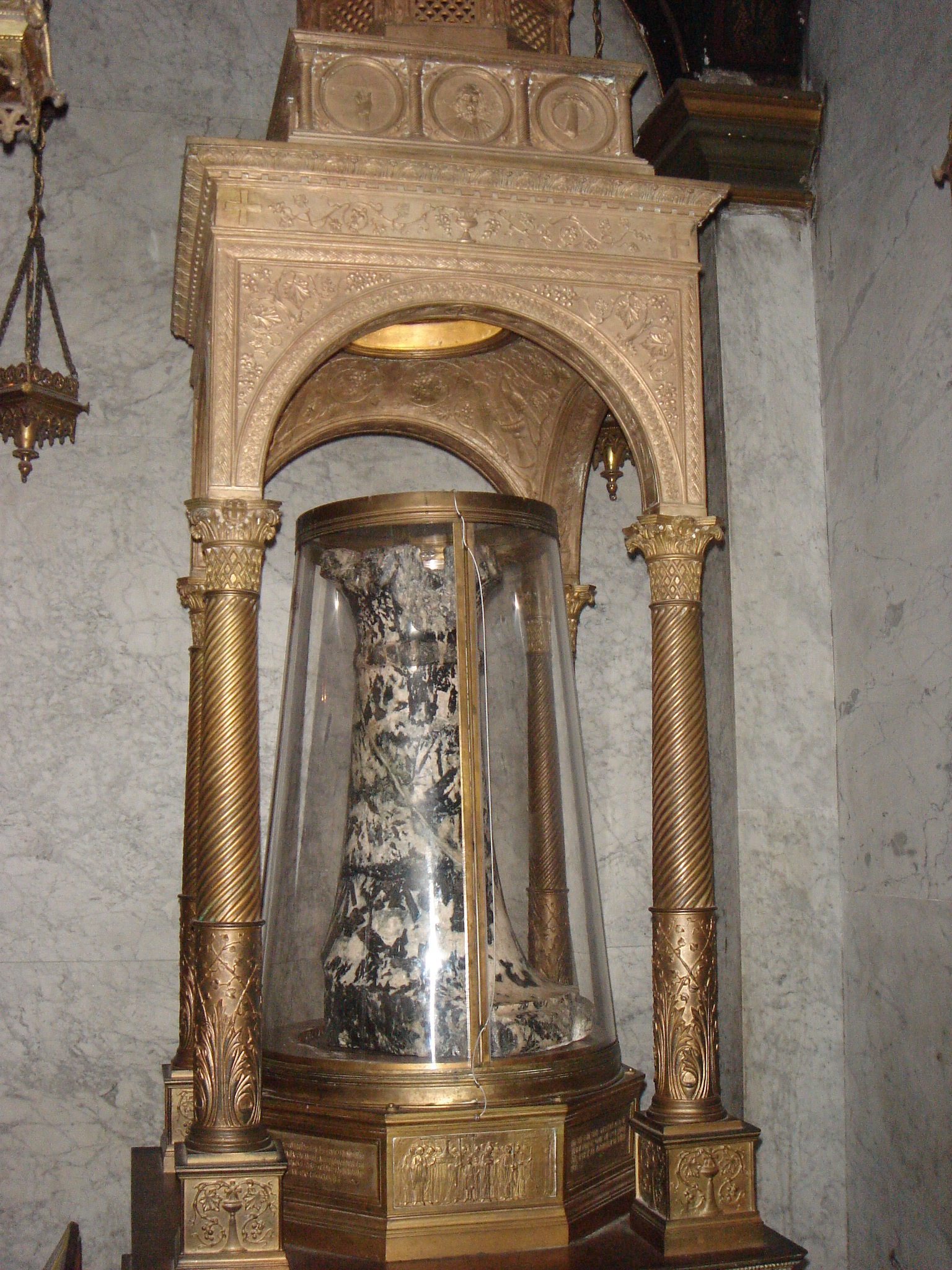
Column relic at Santa Prassede in Rome

Alleged pieces of the Column or Pillar of the Flagellation, also called the Scourging Post, are kept at different locations.

- Church of the Holy Sepulchre in Jerusalem:
  - Greek Orthodox Chapel of the Derision in the ambulatory
  - Chapel of the Apparition in the Franciscan area, originally in the Cenacle
- Santa Prassede in Rome.
- St. George's Cathedral, in Istanbul.

== In art ==
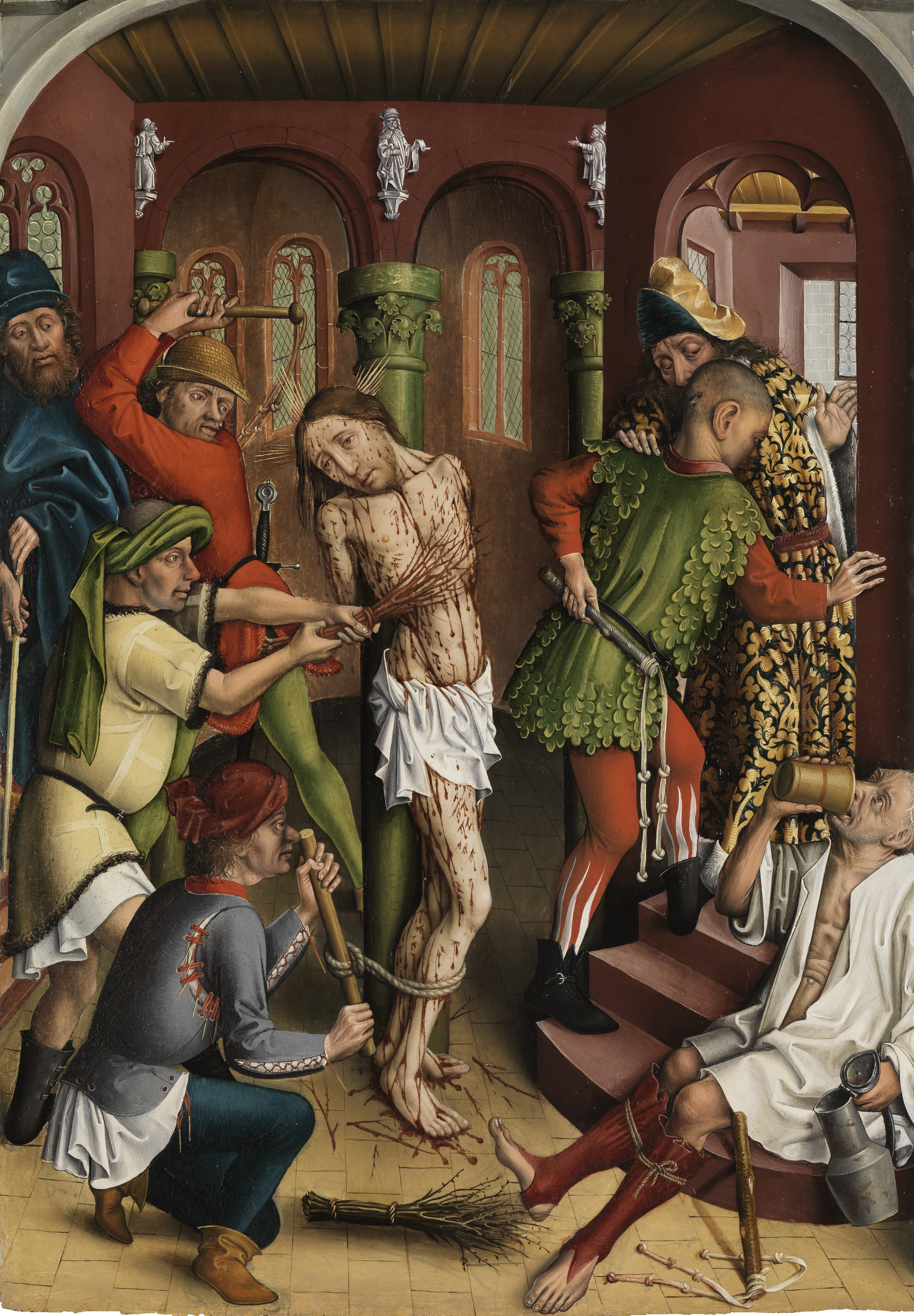
from the Karlsruhe Passion, c. 1450-55

The Flagellation first appears in Western art in the 9th century. It is almost never found in Byzantine art, and remains very rare in Eastern Orthodox art of any date. Initially found in illuminated manuscripts and small ivories, there are surviving monumental wall-paintings of the subject from around 1000 in Italy. From the start, there are most often three figures, Christ and two servants of Pontius Pilate who flog him. In early depictions, Christ may be naked, or wearing a long robe, facing out or seen from behind; from the 12th century it is standard for Christ to wear a loincloth (perizoma) and face out towards the viewer. Christ's face is normally visible, giving artists the "technical problem of showing him receiving the strokes on his back – the usual place – while at the same time leaving his face visible". Often, he appears to be receiving strokes on the front of his body.

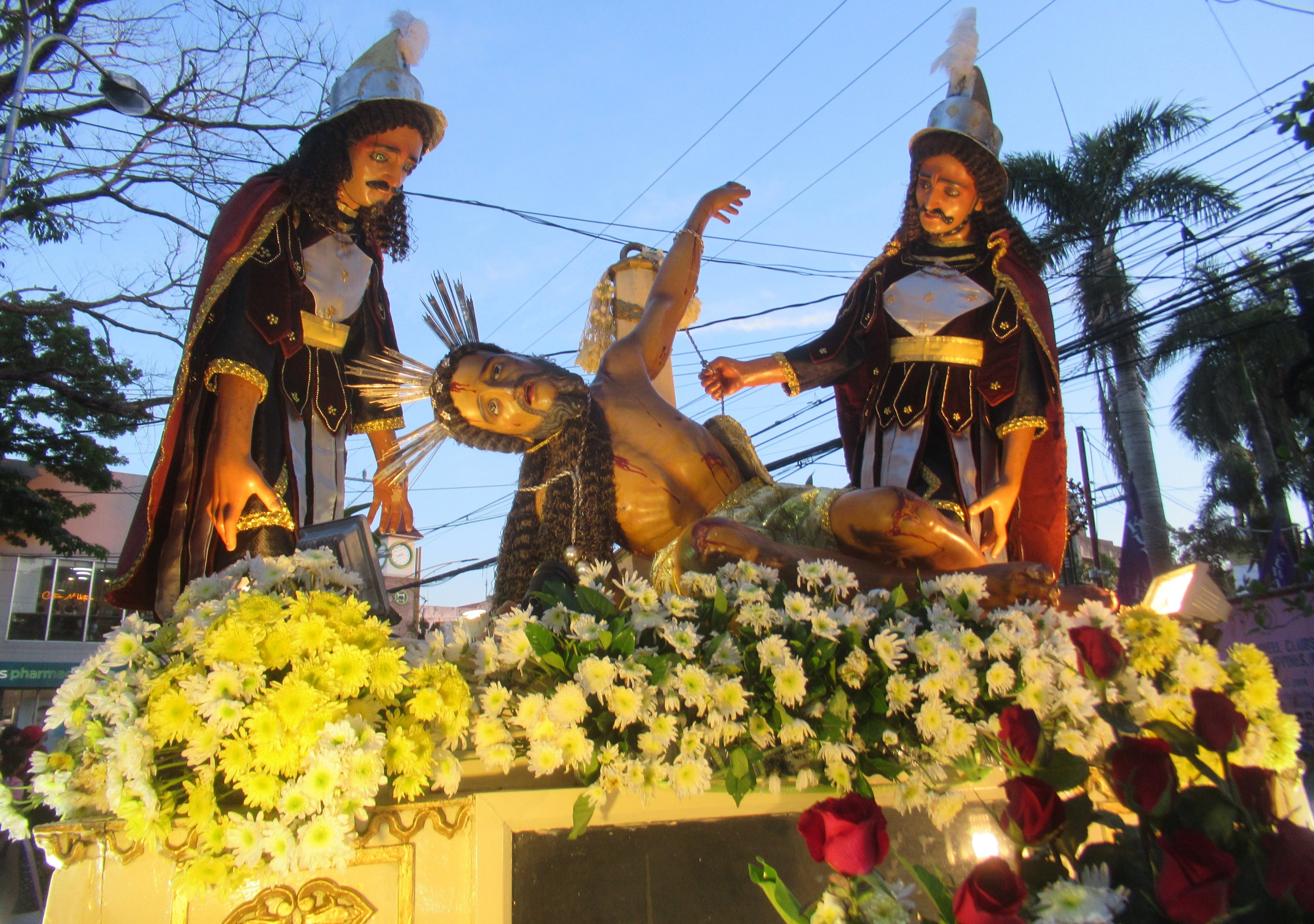
1863 Philippines "Jesús Desmayado"

Pontius Pilate is sometimes shown watching the scene, and his wife's servant may approach him with her message, and in the later Middle Ages, probably under the influence of Passion plays, the number of men beating Christ may be three or four, increasingly caricatured in the North as grotesque figures in the dress of contemporary mercenaries. Sometimes another figure, who may be Herod, is present. The Flagellation was at the hands of those working for Pontius Pilate, but the floggers may sometimes wear Jewish hats. Following the Maestà of Duccio, the scene may take place in public, before an audience of the Jewish people.

The Franciscans, who promoted self-flagellation as a means of identification with the suffering of Christ, were probably responsible for a number of large Italian processional crosses in which the Flagellation occupies the back of the cross, with a Crucifixion on the front. These were presumably sometimes followed in processions by flagellants, who could see Christ suffering in front of them.

=== Notable examples ===
Single works:

- Flagellation of Christ (Piero della Francesca), 1455–1460
- Christ at the Column (Antonello da Messina), c. 1475
- The Flagellation of Christ (Caravaggio), 1607
- Christ at the Column (Caravaggio), 1607

In cycles:

- Maestà (Duccio)
- Scrovegni Chapel by Giotto

== In film and music ==
The flagellation of Jesus ("Trial Before Pilate (Including the 39 Lashes)") is a climactic event in the rock musical Jesus Christ Superstar. Modern filmmakers have also depicted Christ being flogged. It is a significant scene in Mel Gibson's 2004 The Passion of the Christ. In Kubrick's A Clockwork Orange, Alex imagines himself as a Roman soldier flogging Jesus.

== Gallery ==
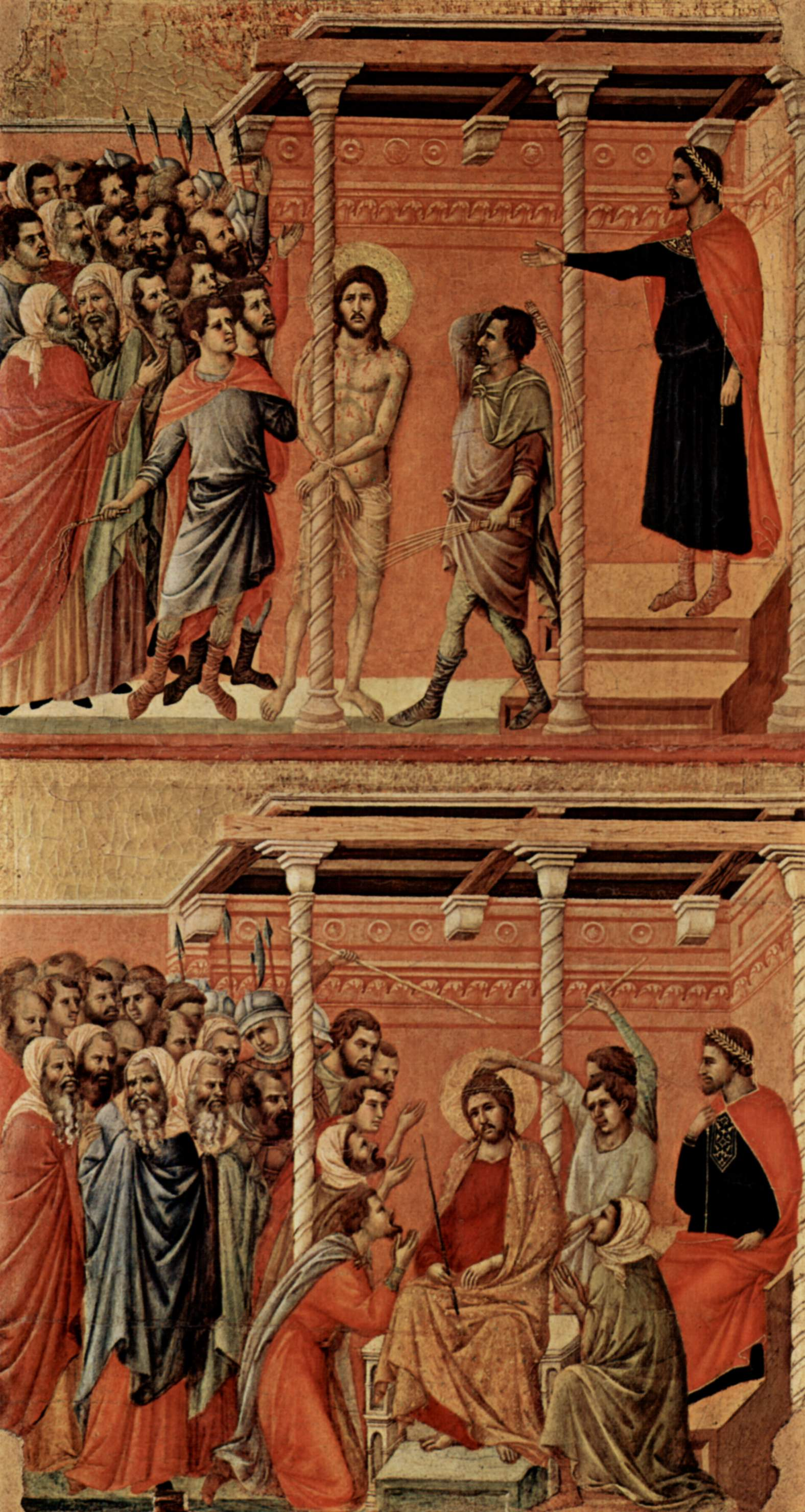
Maestà by Duccio

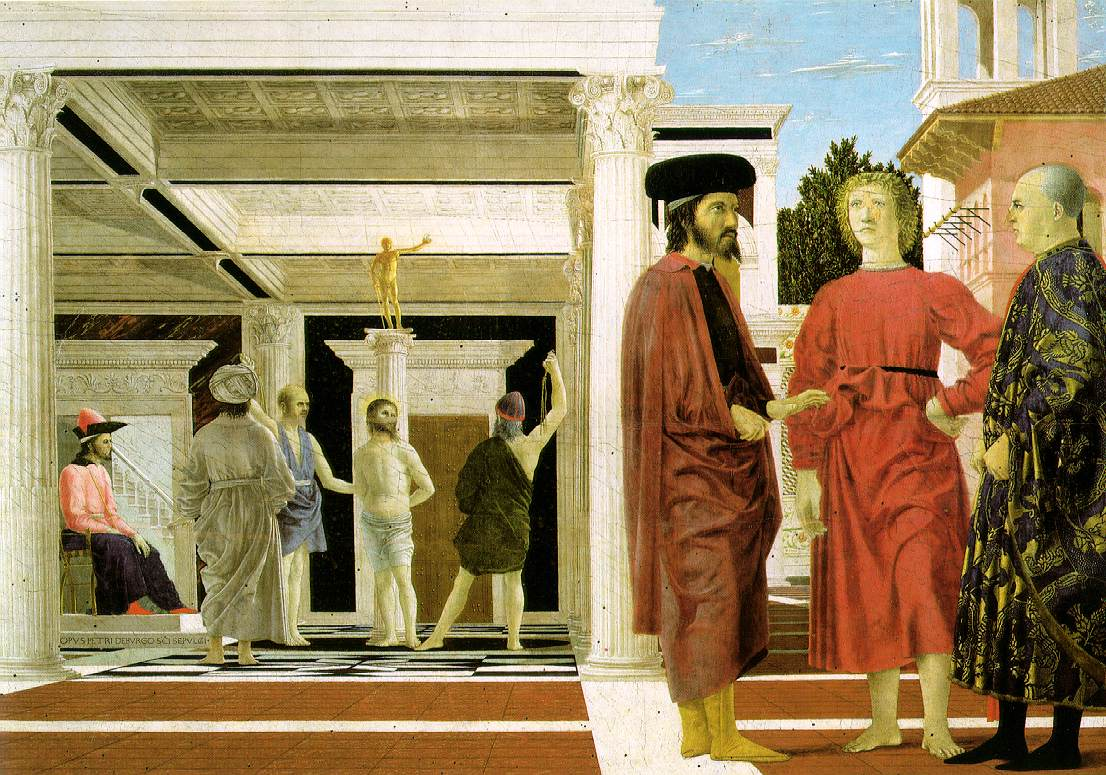
Flagellation of Christ by Piero della Francesca

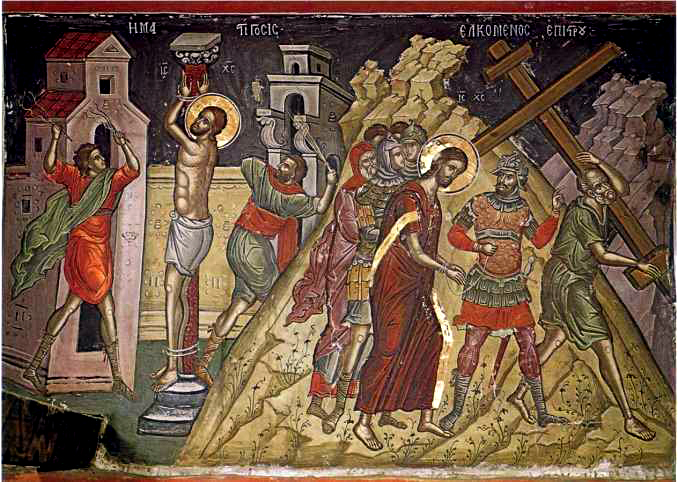
Greek Orthodox fresco by Theophanes the Cretan

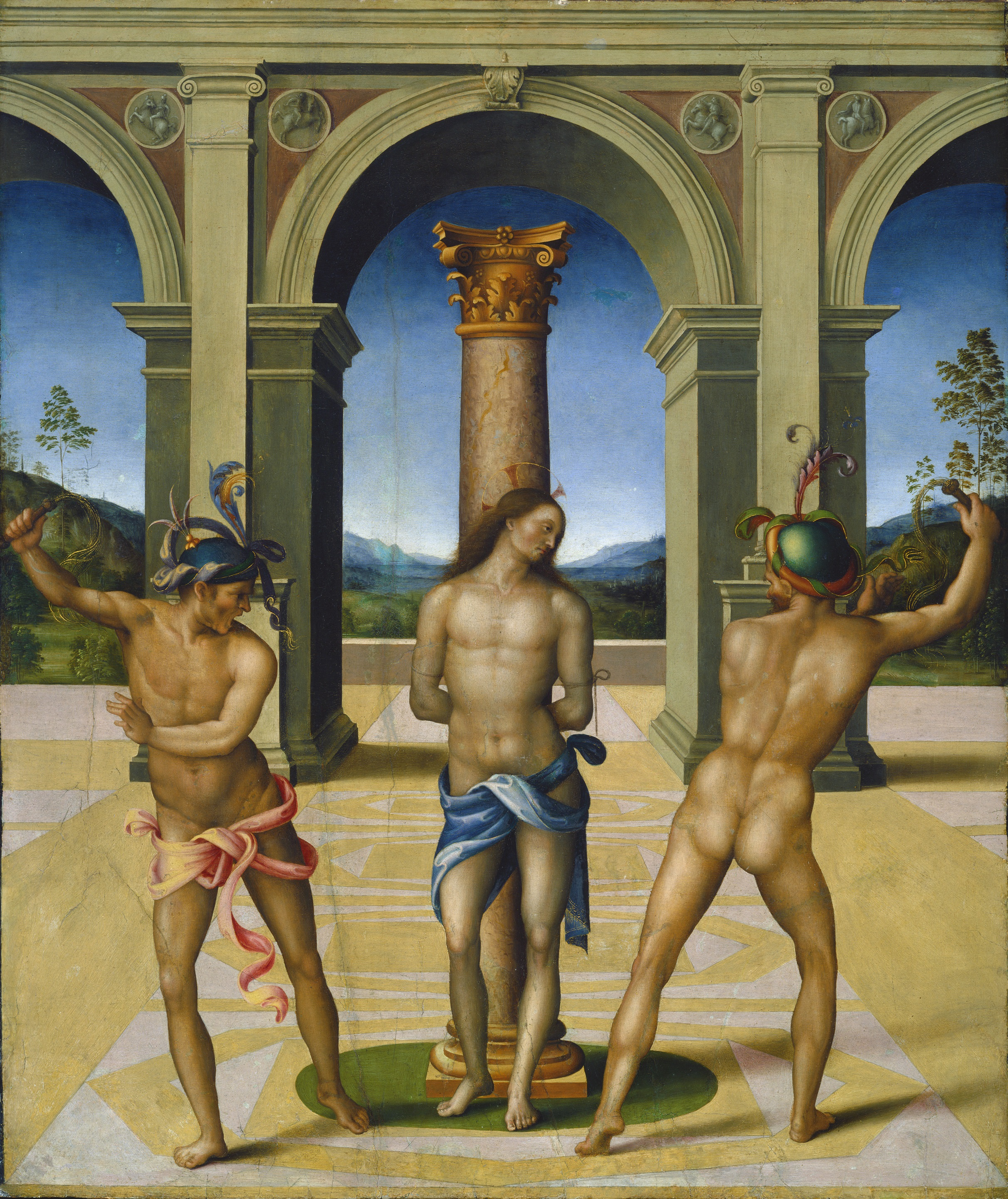
Bacchiacca

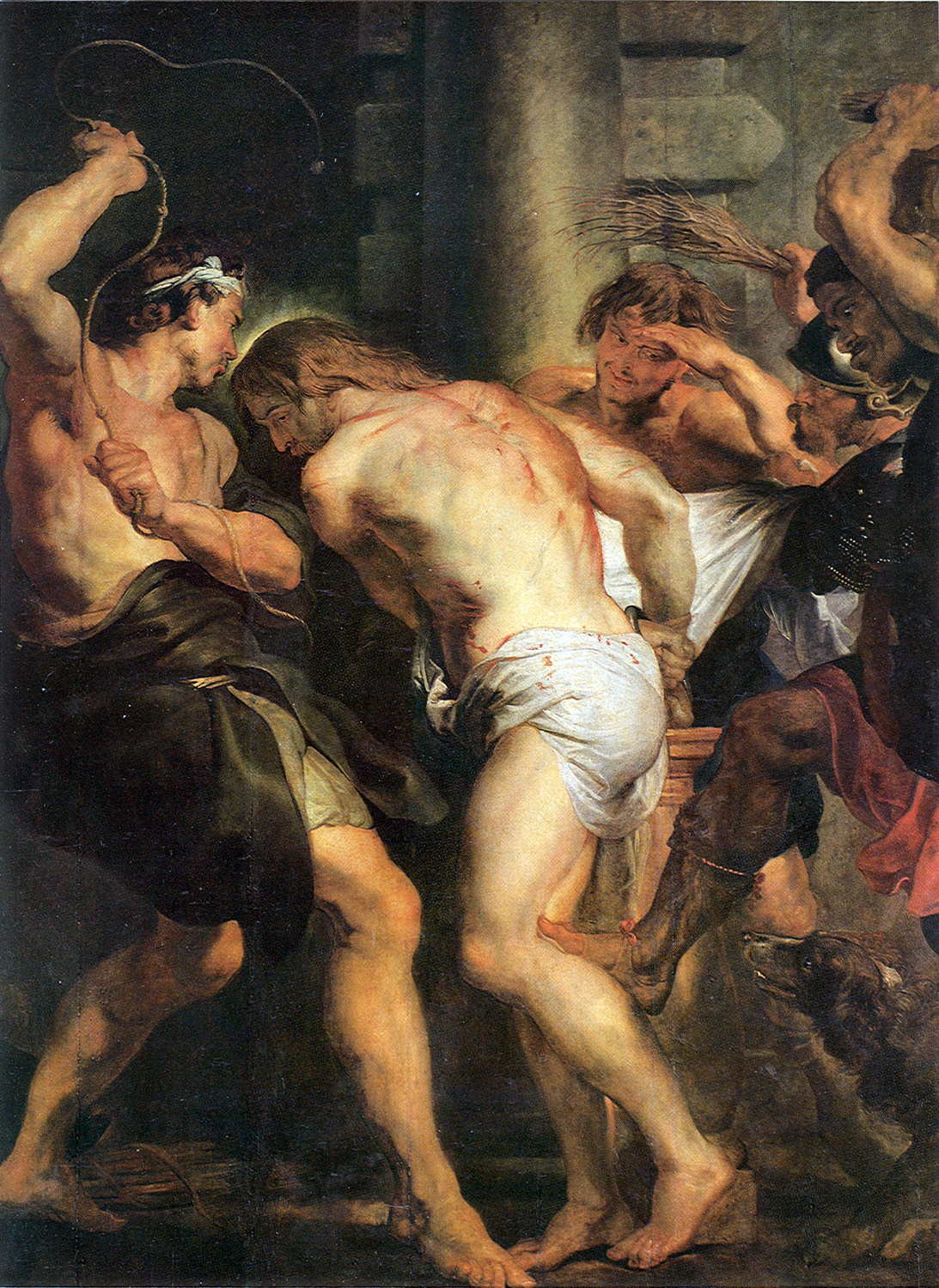
Peter Paul Rubens, c. 1617

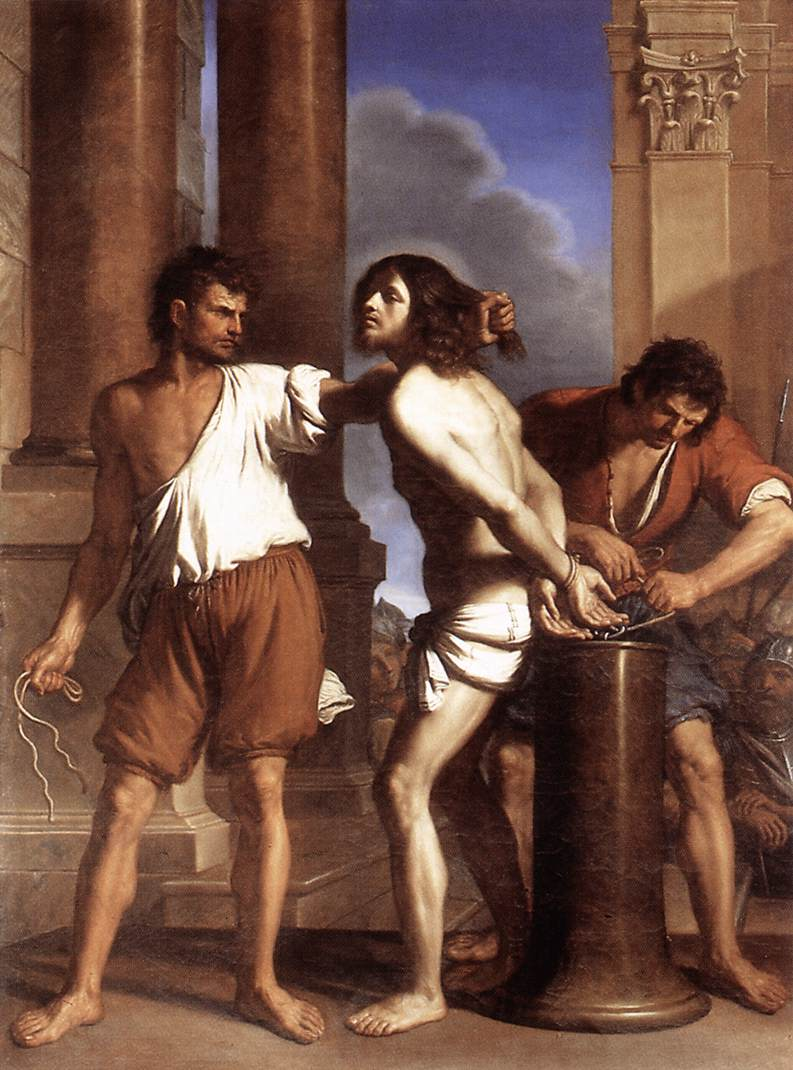
Guercino, 1657

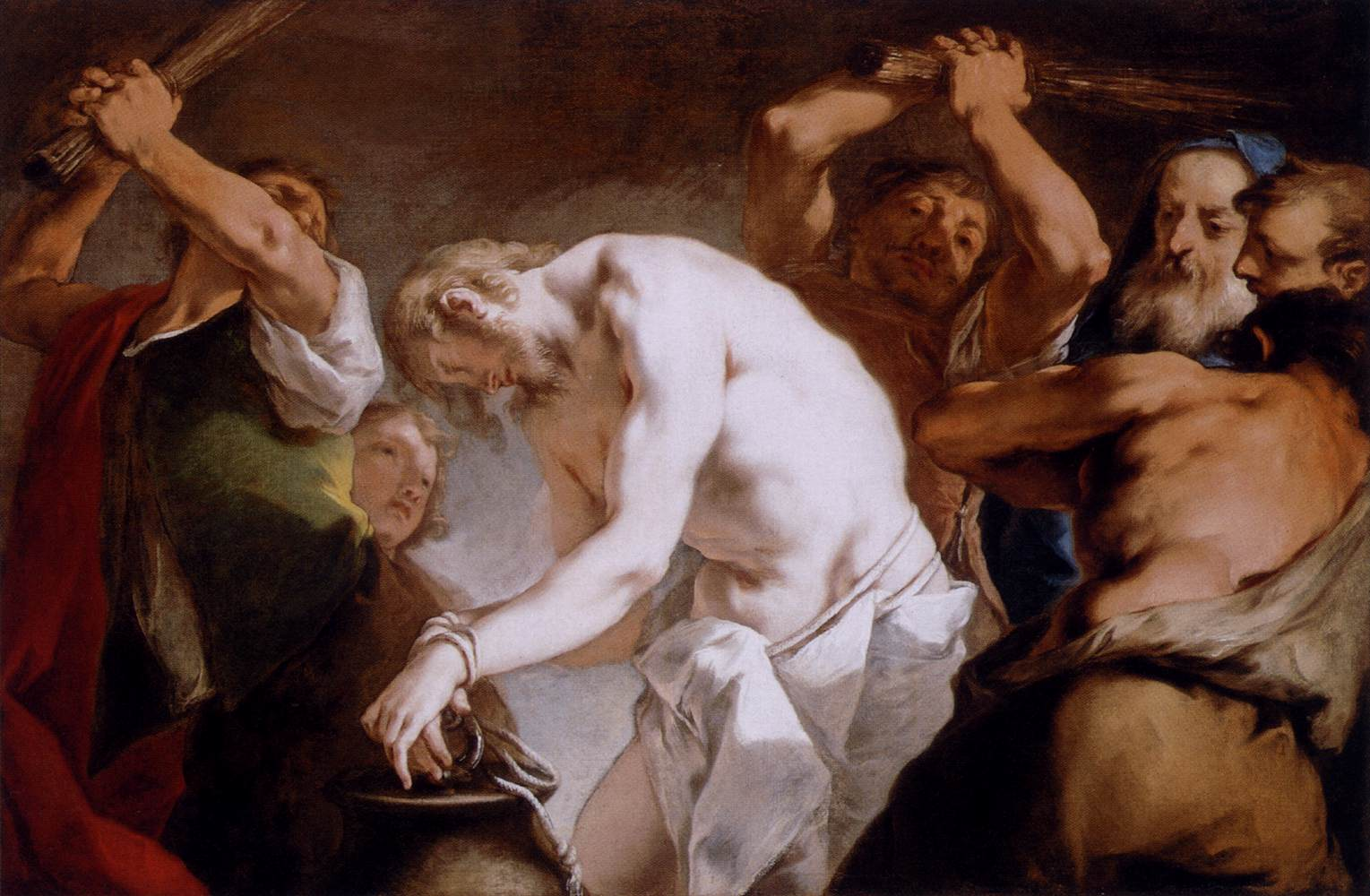
Nicolò Grassi, 1720

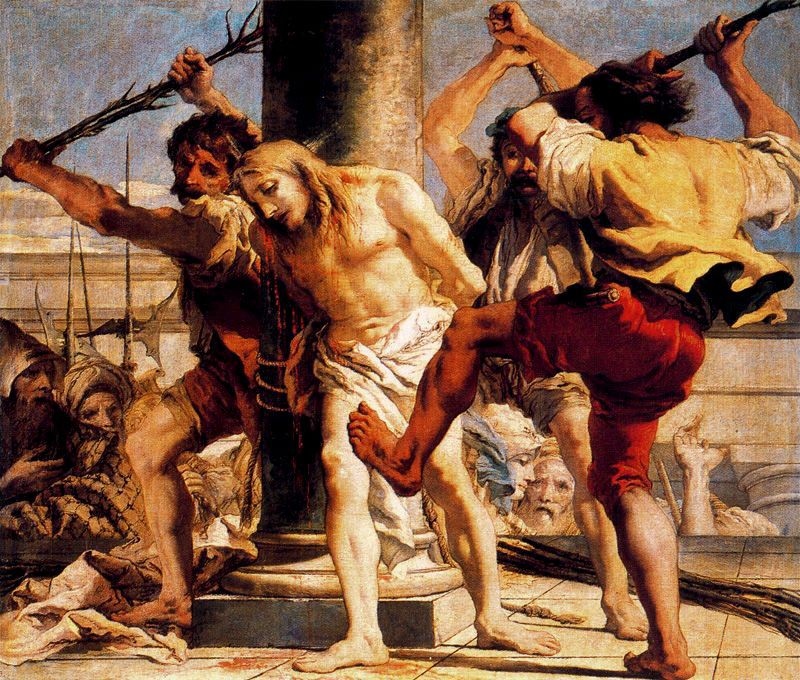
Giovanni Domenico Tiepolo

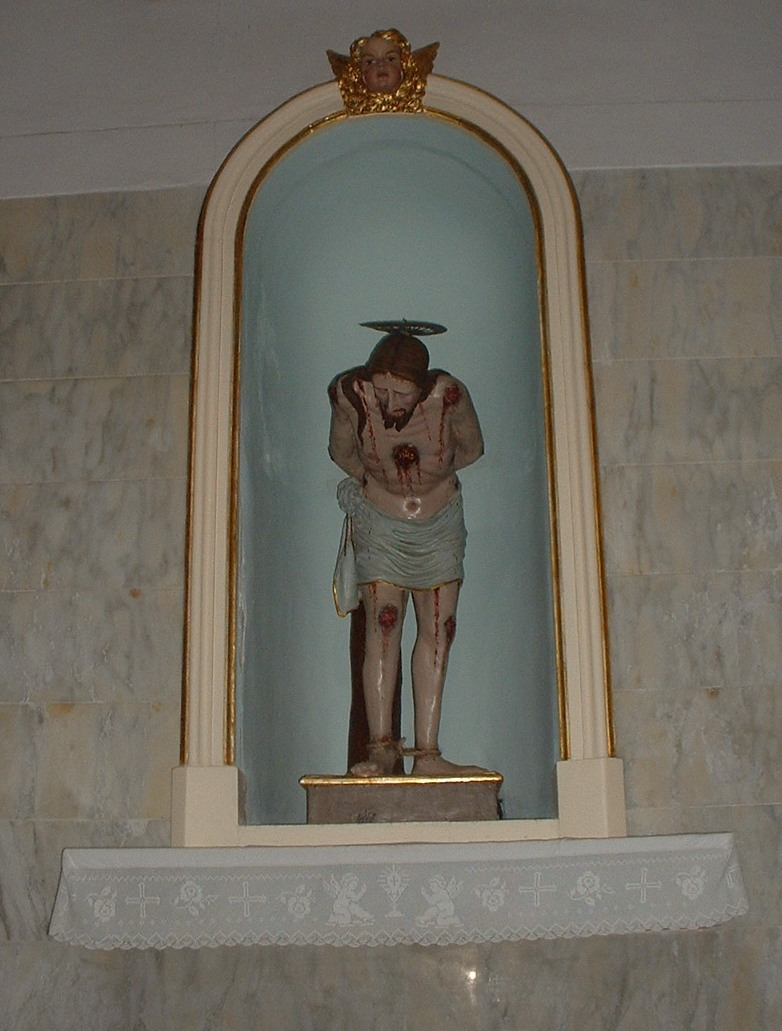
Christ at the Column, Italian sculpture, 1817

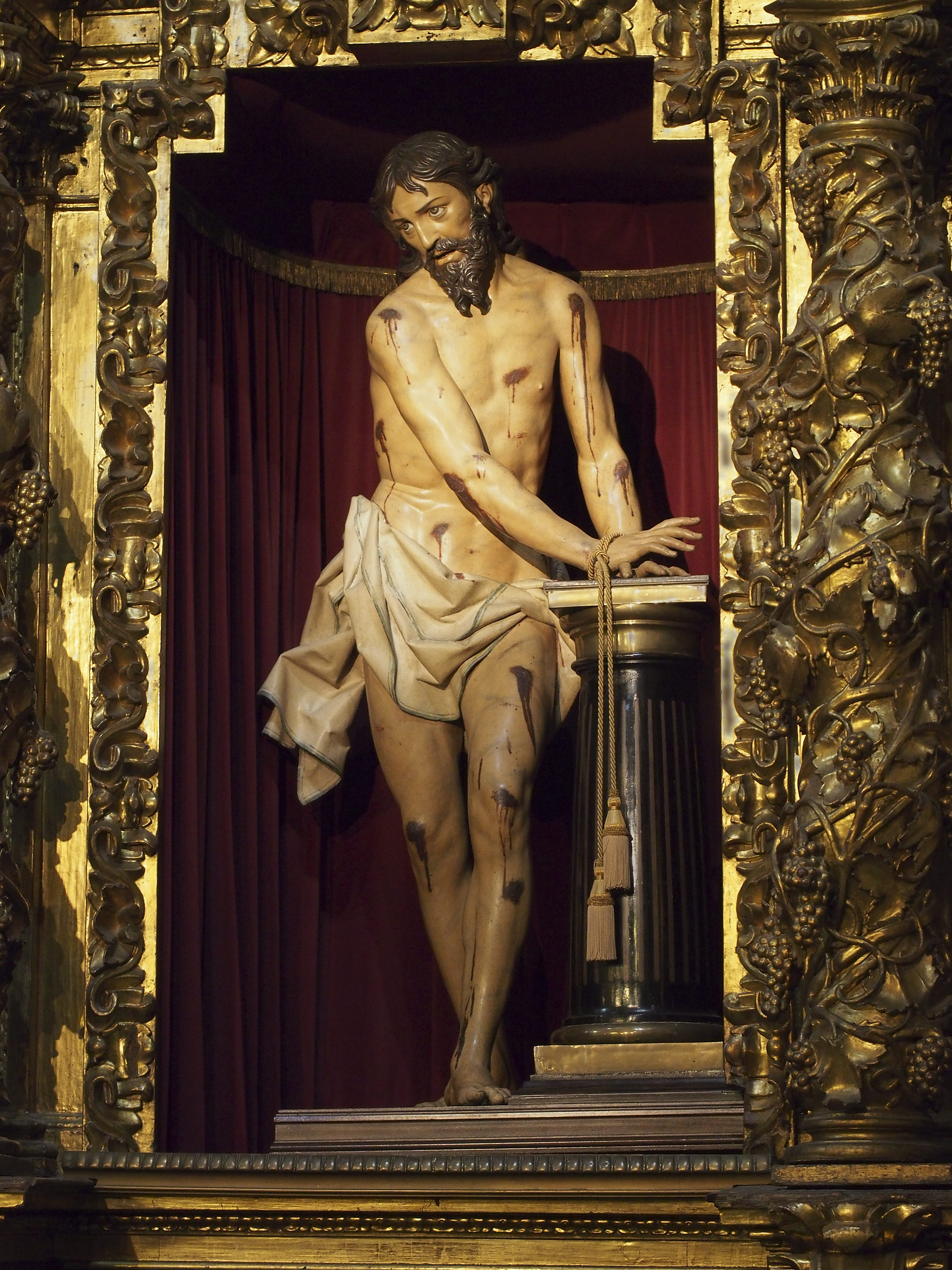
Christ at the Column by Gregorio Fernández

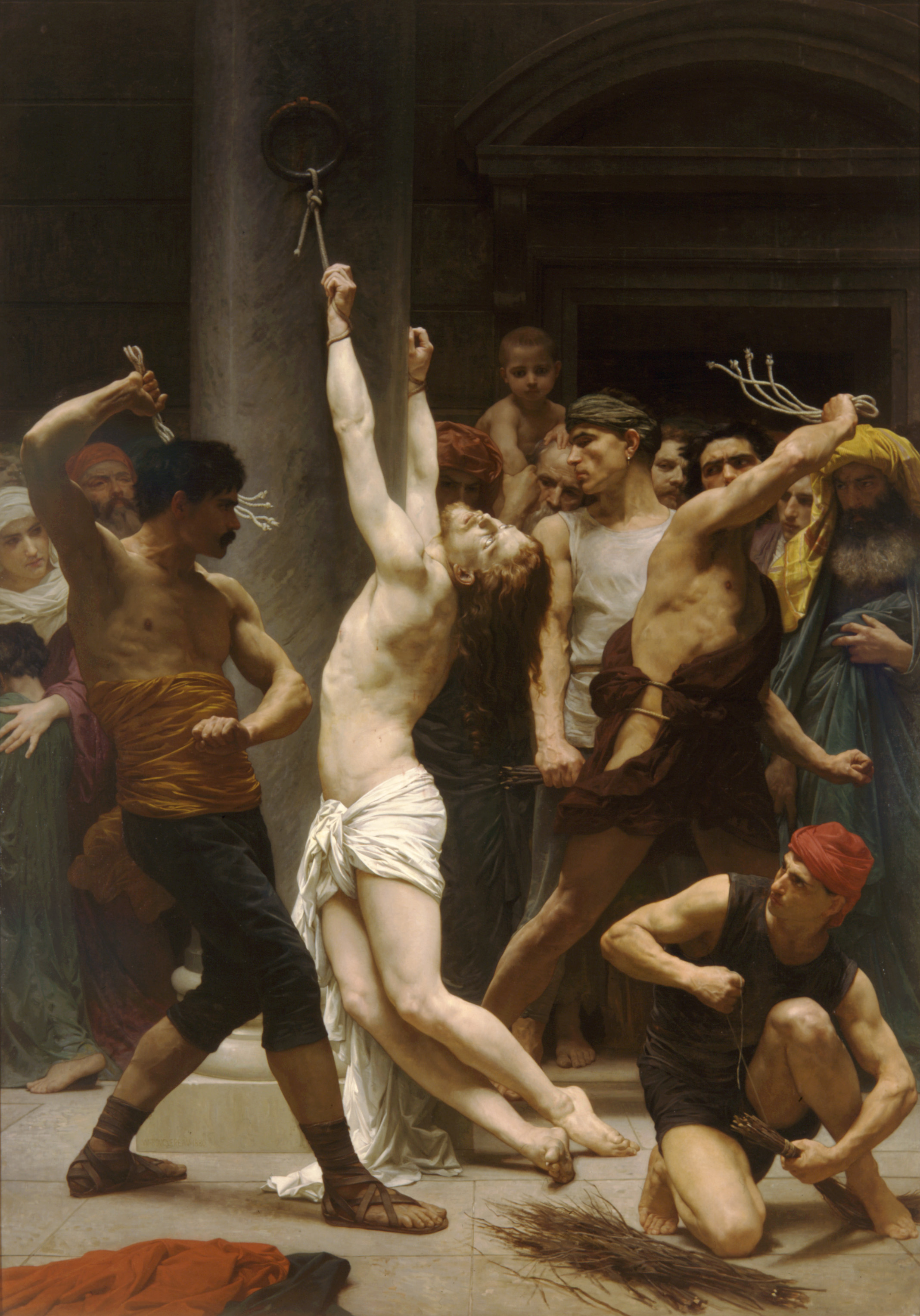
The Flagellation of Our Lord Jesus Christ by William-Adolphe Bouguereau

== See also ==
- Life of Jesus in the New Testament
- Passion of Jesus
- Arma Christi
- Relics associated with Jesus
