= Salome with the Head of John the Baptist (Caravaggio, Madrid) =

Painting by Caravaggio

Salome with the Head of John the Baptist (Madrid)
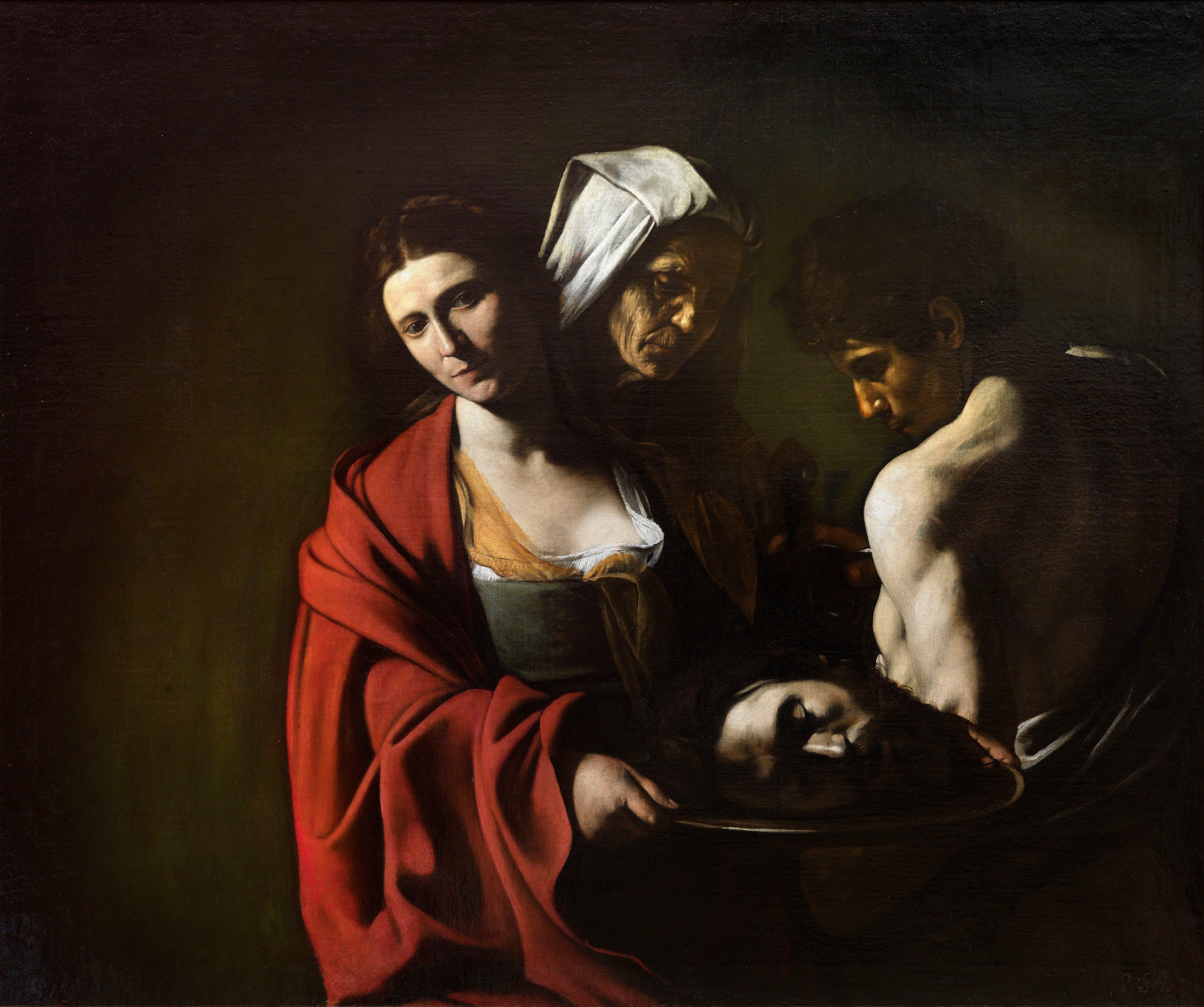
- Artist: Caravaggio
- Year: c. 1609
- Medium: Oil on canvas
- Dimensions: 116 cm × 140 cm (46 in × 55 in)
- Location: Royal Collections Gallery, Madrid

Salome with the Head of John the Baptist (Madrid) is an oil on canvas painting by the Italian master Caravaggio, from c. 1609. It is held in the Royal Collections Gallery, in Madrid.

The early Caravaggio biographer Giovanni Bellori, writing in 1672, records the artist sending a Salome with the Head of John the Baptist from Naples to the Grand Master of the Knights of Malta, Fra Alof de Wignacourt, in the hope of regaining favour after having been expelled from the Order in 1608. It seems likely that this is the work, according to Caravaggio scholar John Gash. Gash also notes that the executioner, looking down at the severed head, helps transform the painting "from a provocative spectacle into a profound meditation on death and human malevolence."

== See also ==
- Salome with the Head of John the Baptist (Caravaggio), London
- List of paintings by Caravaggio
