= Gerard Pietersz van Zijl =

Dutch painter

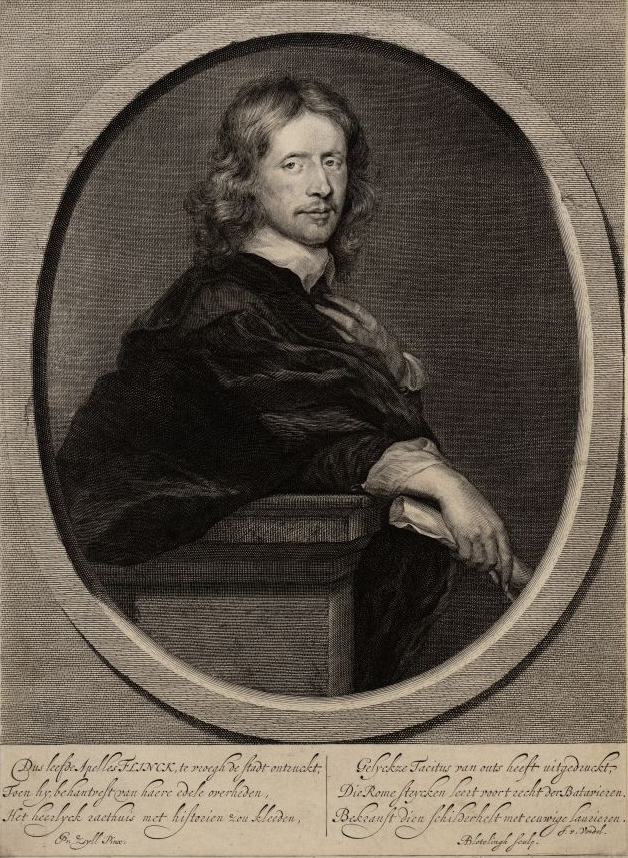
Portrait of Govert Flinck with poem by Joost van den Vondel, by Gerard Pietersz van Zijl

Gerrit or Gerard Pietersz van Zijl, also van Zyl / Zyll or Geerards (c.1607, Leiden – 19 December 1665, Amsterdam) was a Dutch Golden Age painter of portraits and genre scenes.

== Biography ==
He is the best-known member of a family of painters active in the 16th and 17th centuries during the Dutch Golden Age. A pupil of Jacob Pynas in Amsterdam, he worked in London from 1639 to 1641, where he was a friend of Anthony van Dyck. His portraits were popular in his own lifetime, and according to Houbraken's biography of Jan Verkolje, he was an inspiration to aspiring portrait painters. He painted a now-lost portrait of Govert Flinck which Abraham Blooteling made into a print.
