= The Crowning with Thorns (Caravaggio, Vienna) =

Painting by Caravaggio

- Incoronazione di spine (Italian)
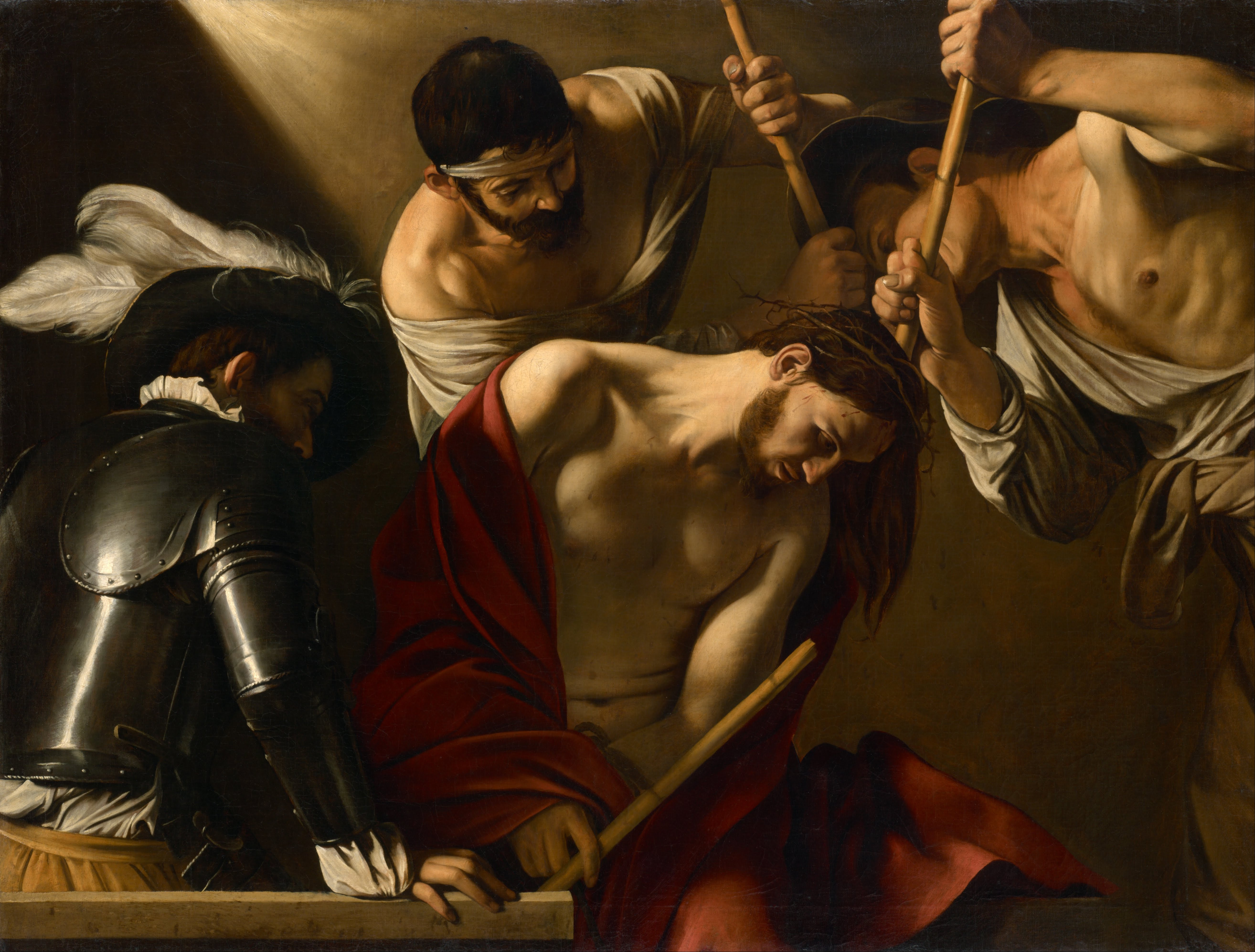
- Artist: Caravaggio
- Year: c. 1602/1604 or 1607
- Medium: Oil on canvas
- Dimensions: 127 cm × 165.5 cm (50 in × 65.2 in)
- Location: Kunsthistorisches Museum; Vienna

The Crowning with Thorns is a painting by the Italian painter Michelangelo Merisi da Caravaggio. Made probably in 1602/1604 or possibly around 1607, it is now located in the Kunsthistorisches Museum, Vienna. It was bought in Rome by the Imperial ambassador, Baron Ludwig von Lebzelter in 1809, but did not arrive in Vienna until 1816.

== History ==
According to Caravaggio's biographer Giovanni Bellori, The Crowning with Thorns was made for Caravaggio's patron Vincenzo Giustiniani and can be traced convincingly to the Giustiniani collection. An attribution to Giustiniani would place it in the period before 1606, when Caravaggio fled Rome, but Peter Robb dates it to 1607, when the artist was in Naples.

The painting depicts a crown of thorns being forced onto the head of Jesus before his crucifixion to mock his claim to authority. The twisted body of Christ was influenced by the Belvedere Torso. The painting was designed as a supraporte to be hung over a doorway.

== Style ==
Caravaggio's patron Vincenzo Giustiniani was an intellectual as well as a collector, and late in life he wrote a paper about art in which he identified twelve grades of accomplishment. In the highest class he named just two artists, Caravaggio and Annibale Carracci, as those capable of combining realism and style in the most accomplished manner. This Crowning with Thorns illustrates what Giustiniani meant: the cruelty of the two torturers hammering home the thorns is depicted as acutely observed reality, as is the bored slouch of the official leaning on the rail as he oversees the death of God; meanwhile Christ is suffering real pain with patient endurance; all depicted within a classical composition of contrasting and intersecting horizontals and diagonals.

The theme of pain and sadism is central to the work.

== See also ==
- The Crowning with Thorns, c.1604 painting of the same subject, attributed to Caravaggio
- List of paintings by Caravaggio
