= Madonna of the Rosary (Caravaggio) =

Painting by Caravaggio

- Madonna del Rosario (Italian)
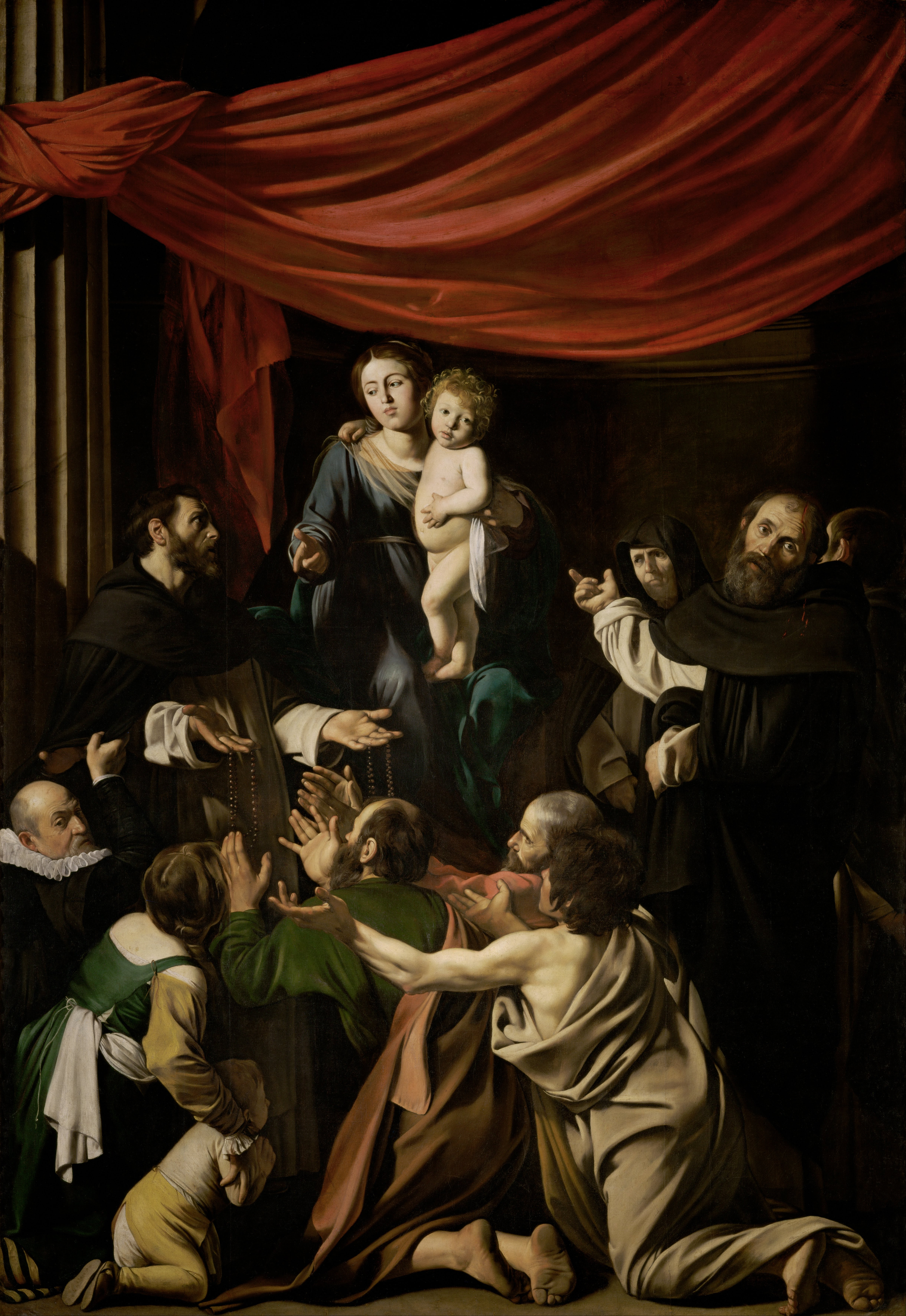
- Artist: Caravaggio
- Year: 1607
- Medium: Oil on canvas
- Dimensions: 364.5 cm × 249.5 cm (143.5 in × 98.2 in)
- Location: Kunsthistorisches Museum; Vienna

The Madonna of the Rosary is a painting finished in 1607 by the Italian Baroque painter Caravaggio, now in the Kunsthistorisches Museum in Vienna. It is the only painting by Caravaggio that could be called a standard Baroque altarpiece.

The commissioner of the work is uncertain. As altarpiece it would have been commissioned for a Dominican church, given the presence of Saint Dominic and Saint Peter Martyr of Verona. The donor is included in the painting; at the left, dressed in black with a ruff, seeking protection under the cloak of Saint Dominic and peering out at the viewer.

According to some, the donor was Nicholas Radulovic, a rich merchant of Ragusa (now Dubrovnik, Croatia) and the first idea for the composition was a Madonna Enthroned with Saints Nicholas and Vito, then the subject was changed to reflect the wishes of the Dominicans. According to others, and perhaps more likely, it was made to decorate the family chapel in the Neapolitan church of San Domenico Maggiore, commissioned by Luigi Carafa-Colonna, relative of Martino Colonna, Overlord of Palestrina, Zagarolo and Paliano, where the painter had taken refuge after escaping from Rome. The large column to the left may be a reference to the Colonna family; it is linked to the big red drape that dominates the scene almost like a sail. The Feast of the Rosary was established in 1571 after the Battle of Lepanto, and Luigi Carafa-Colonna was a relative of Marcantonio Colonna, a leading admiral in the battle. Another possibility is Cesare d'Este, Duke of Modena.

The Madonna is seated on a throne, and seems to give assent with a wave of the hand to Saint Dominic who is dressed in his usual habit and holding a rosary. The faithful turn to him for grace, kneeling, with a donor portrait at far left, of a man in black with a ruff. On the right is St Peter Martyr with a large scar on his forehead (just like Caravaggio who was wounded in the head a few months earlier in the scuffle with Ranuccio Tommasoni and still had a visible scar), which indicates the Virgin who is out of the picture. Behind him are other Dominicans.

The painting was likely done between 8 January and mid-July 1607, that is between the completion of the Seven Works of Mercy and the departure of the painter for Malta. It is possible that something may have gone wrong with the original commission, as the painting was very soon on the market and bought by a Flemish consortium that included Rubens. After being offered to Vincenzo I Gonzaga, Duke of Mantua, it was taken to Antwerp and offered to the Dominican church there. It is first mentioned in a letter by Frans Pourbus the Younger, a painter at the court of Mantua. On 15 September 1607 he wrote to his employer, Vincenzo I Gonzaga, the Duke of Mantua, that the painting was on the market in Naples for 400 ducats.

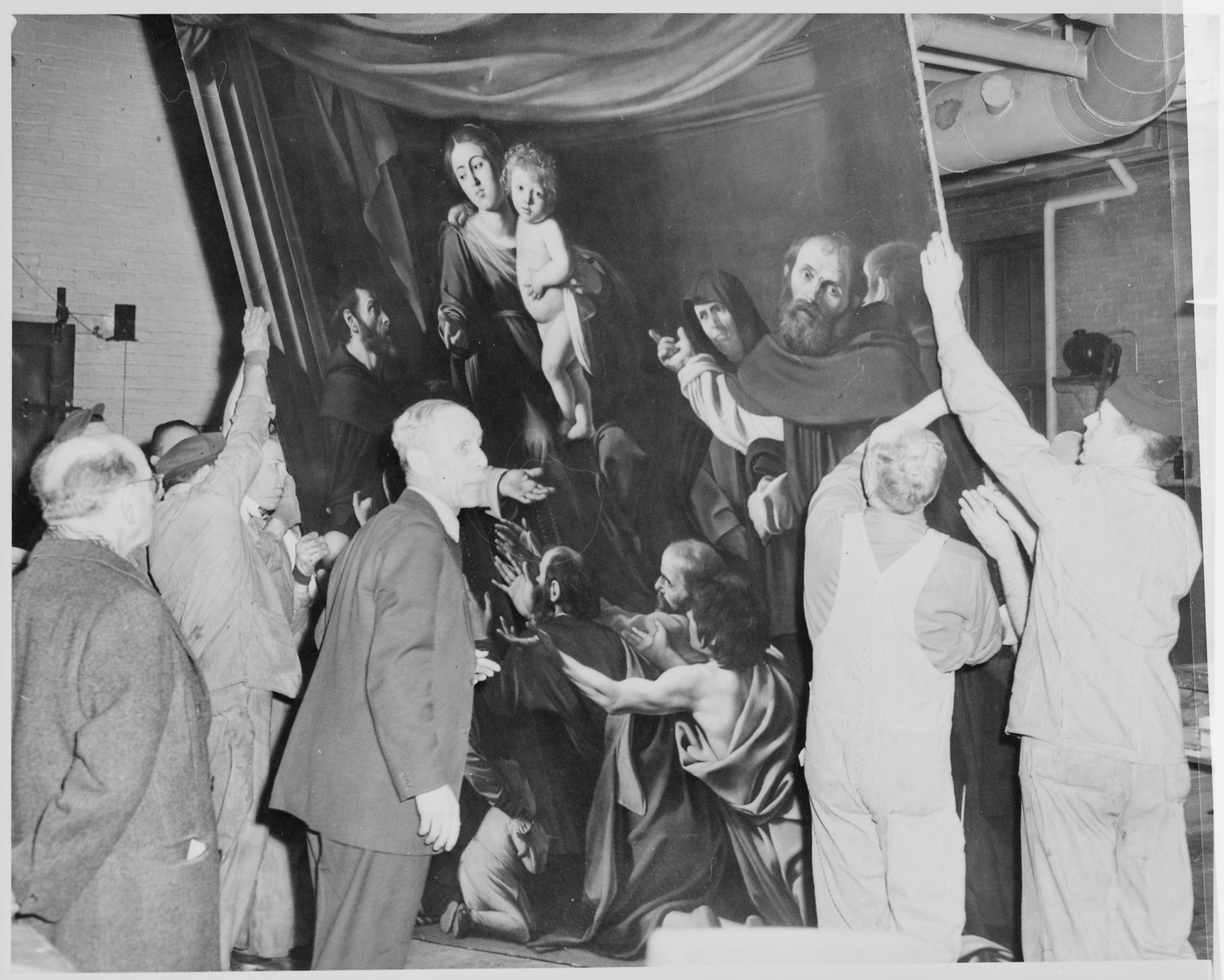
Uncrating the painting at the Metropolitan Museum of Art, New York, 1950

== See also ==
- List of paintings by Caravaggio
- Our Lady of the Rosary
