= Van Geel =

Van Geel or van Geel is a Dutch toponymic surname. It means "of Geel" (a town in the province of Antwerp). It may refer to the following people:

- Jacob van Geel (1585–1648), Dutch painter
- Joost van Geel (1631–1698), Dutch painter
- Marten Peeters van Geel (c. 1500–1566), Flemish painter and print publisher
- Martin van Geel (born 1960), Dutch footballer (soccer player)
- Pieter van Geel (born 1951), Dutch politician
