= Peiraikos =

Ancient Greek painter

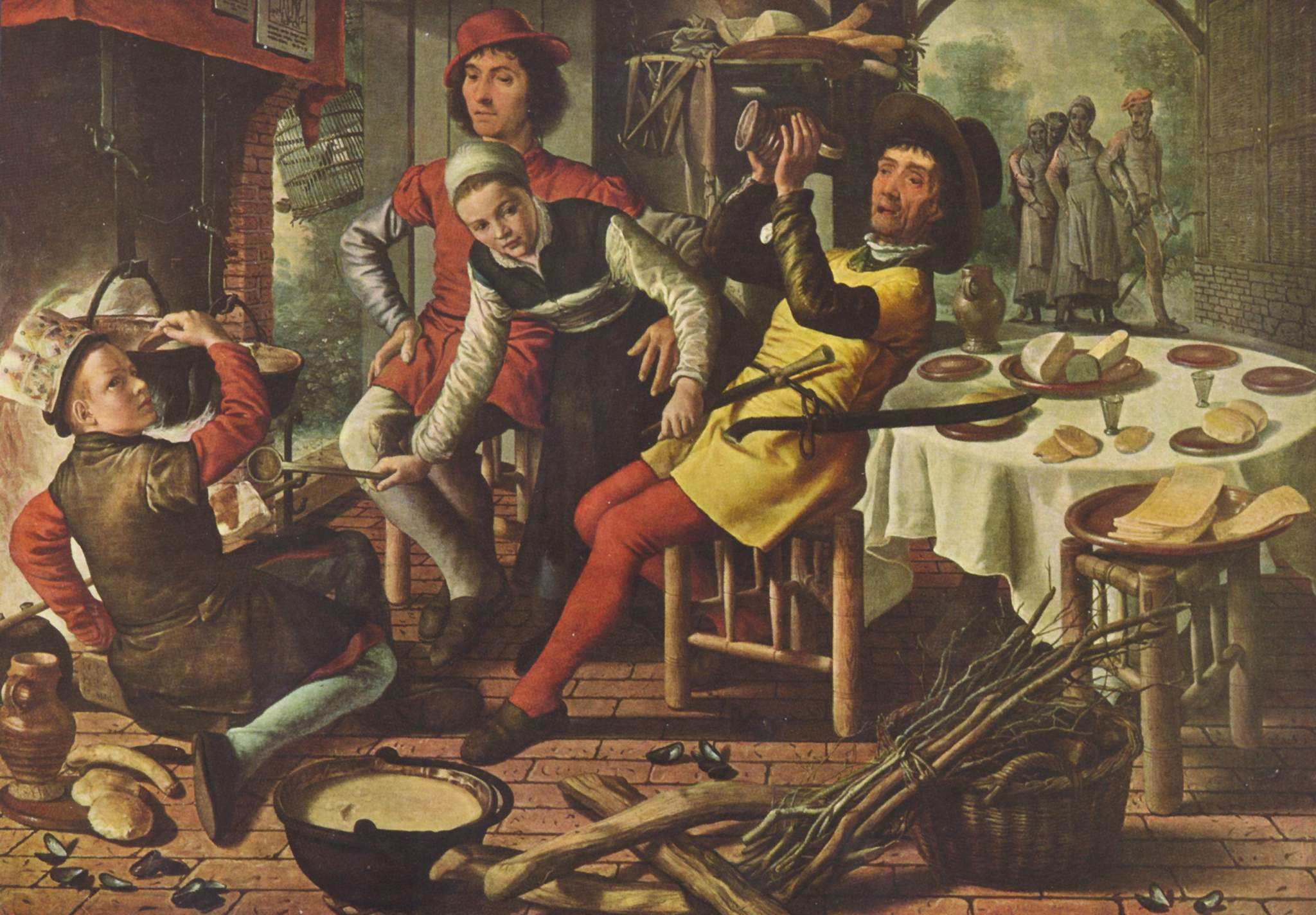
A kitchen scene by Pieter Aertsen, who was compared to Peiraikos

Peiraikos, or Piraeicus or Peiraeicus (Ancient Greek: Πειραϊκός), was an Ancient Greek painter of uncertain date and location. He was the chief representative of what is called rhopography (ῥοπογραφία), or the painting of petty subjects, such as still-life. None of his work is known to have survived and he is known only from a brief discussion by the Latin author Pliny the Elder. Pliny's passage comes in the middle of his discussion of painting in Book XXXV of his Natural History, completed about 78 AD:

It is well to add an account of the artists who won fame with the brush in painting smaller pictures. Amongst them was Peiraikos. In mastery of his art but few take rank above him, yet by his choice of a path he has perhaps marred his own success, for he followed a humble line, winning however the highest glory that it had to bring. He painted barbers' shops, cobblers' stalls, asses, eatables and similar subjects, earning for himself the name of rhyparographos [painter of dirt/low things]. In these subjects he could give consummate pleasure, selling them for more than other artists received for their large pictures.

In the terms of later art history, he painted cabinet paintings of genre subjects. Generally speaking, Pliny seems to derive his information from Varro (116 BC – 27 BC), and Peiraikos may have been contemporary with or somewhat earlier than him, placing the painter at the end of the Hellenistic period or in the early Graeco-Roman period. From his tone, it seems that "Pliny does not know how to judge Piraeicus". Early Modern commentators were to take both approving and disapproving attitudes to later artists compared to him, often assuming that Pliny's meaning followed their own. Peiraikos' subjects may well have been given a comic treatment, but this is not clear. Some equivalent subjects survive in Roman art, especially in shops and shopfronts in Pompeii, small sections of floor mosaics, and in the reliefs of men at work on the Tomb of Eurysaces the Baker in Rome (c. 50–20 BC), but it is interesting to know that such subjects were popular with collectors at the top end of the Roman art market.

Propertius makes a reference to a painter of "small art" in his Elegies, but the surviving text is corrupt, and it is generally thought to intend a reference to the 5th century BC Athenian painter Parrhasios, whose trompe-l'œil painted curtain fooled Xeuxis, an anecdote reported in another passage of Pliny.

== In Early Modern art criticism ==
Peiraikos became frequently referred to in discussions of art in the late Renaissance and especially the Baroque periods, when genre subjects were becoming popular again, and the need for classical authority was still strongly felt. The ambiguous tone of Pliny's comments allowed later writers to enlist Pliny on either side of the argument for and against Peiraikos' humble modern equivalents. One of the first artists to specialize in genre subjects, Pieter Aertsen was an innovative late-16th-century painter of kitchen scenes, who was compared to Peiraikos by the Dutch Renaissance humanist Hadrianus Junius (Adriaen de Jonghe, 1511–1575) in his Batavia, published posthumously in 1588, which compares Aertsen at each point of Pliny's description in a wholly laudatory manner. An article by Zoran Kwak argues that a painting by his son Pieter Pietersz the Elder (1540–1603), normally called Market Scene with the Journey to Emmaus, which features prominently a half-naked figure who is clearly a cook (with Jesus and his companions as smaller figures behind him), in fact represents a self-portrait in a partly comic spirit, depicted as Peiraikos.

Pieter van Laer (1599 – c. 1642) was a Dutch Golden Age painter of genre scenes, active for over a decade in Rome, where his nickname was Il Bamboccio. Artists working in his style, who often painted just such scenes of everyday life as Pliny lists, became known as the Bamboccianti, painters in Bamboccio's manner. Peiraikos is often mentioned in the controversies over the Bamboccianti, for example by Salvator Rosa in his Satires, and later by the Dutch biographer of artists, Samuel Dirksz van Hoogstraten in his Inleyding tot de Hooge Schoole der Schilderkonst (Introduction to the Academy of Painting), Rotterdam 1678. As genre painting became an important element of Dutch Golden Age painting, Peiraikos was used to provide classical precedent for such work, in the relatively few discussions of the appropriateness of such art by Karel van Mander in his Schilder-boeck (1604) and Arnold Houbraken in his The Great Theatre of Dutch Painters (1718–1719). Having originally been often rather cheap, by the late 17th century the best Dutch genre scenes became sought after by collectors across Europe at very high prices, a development following Pliny's account of Peiraikos that was bemoaned by Lessing in his Laocoon (1763), mentioning Dutch painting specifically.

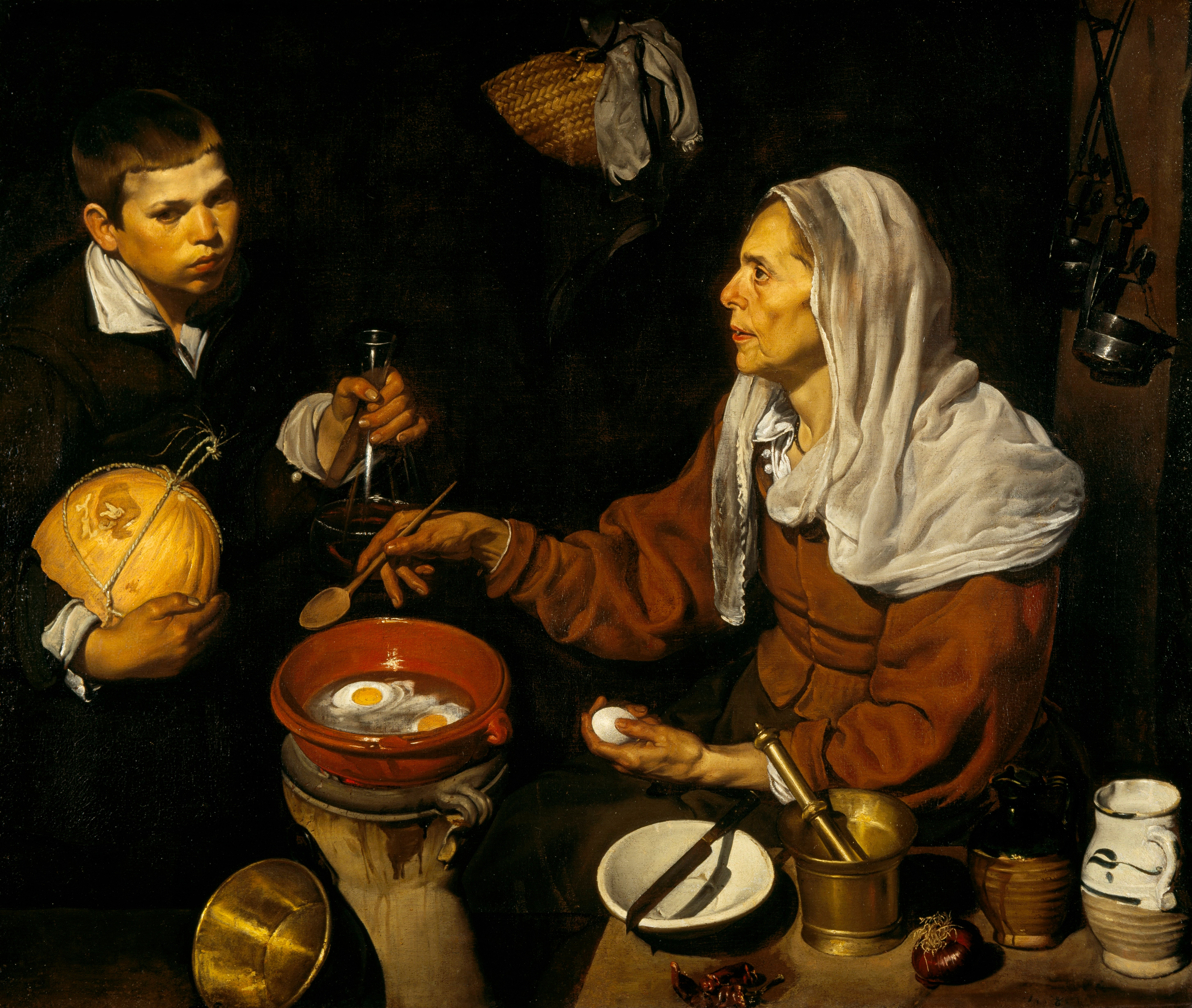
Diego Velázquez, An Old Woman Cooking Eggs, 1618

In Spain, where bodegones or genre tavern scenes had become popular, Peiraikos was referred to by Francisco Pacheco and later Antonio Palomino in the same way, with Palomino comparing Velasquez to him. A reference by the Jesuit writer Baltasar Gracián, comparing Peiraikos to an unnamed contemporary painter also seems to refer to Velasquez. In Italy he is mentioned in passing by Cardinal Gabriele Paleotti, whose De sacris et profanis imaginibus (1582, "Discourse on Sacred and Profane Images") was one of the treatises setting out the Counter-Reformation church's views on the proper role and content of art. Giovanni Battista Agucchi, the secretary of Cardinal Odoardo Farnese and a mover and shaker in the Roman art scene, called Jacopo Bassano the modern Peiraikos, contrasting the pair to Caravaggio and Demetrios of Alopeka, who sculpted "warts and all" portraits of important figures. In France, André Félibien was an influential codifier of the theory of the hierarchy of genres in art, and cited Pliny on Peiraikos, assuming the disapproval of his predecessor.

A passage in the diary of Paul Klee meditates on Peiraikos as an "artist-martyr".

In literature, Rabelais in Gargantua and Pantagruel (Prologue, Book V, c. 1564) compares himself to Peiraikos as a specialist in low subjects: "... and yet for Aesop a Place was found, and the Office of Mythologist; in like manner, inasmuch as I do not aspire to a higher Degree, I pray that they may not disdain to receive me in the Office of small Riparographer and Follower of Piraeicus" (or "Puny Riparographer, or Riffraff-scribler of the Sect of Pyrricus" as his translator Peter Motteux put it in 1694).

== Rhyparographer ==
The term used by Pliny has been anglicized as "rhyparographer", "A painter of low or mean subjects", which the OED first records in 1656, with "rhyparography" in 1678.
