= Magdalena Pietersz =

Dutch Renaissance painter

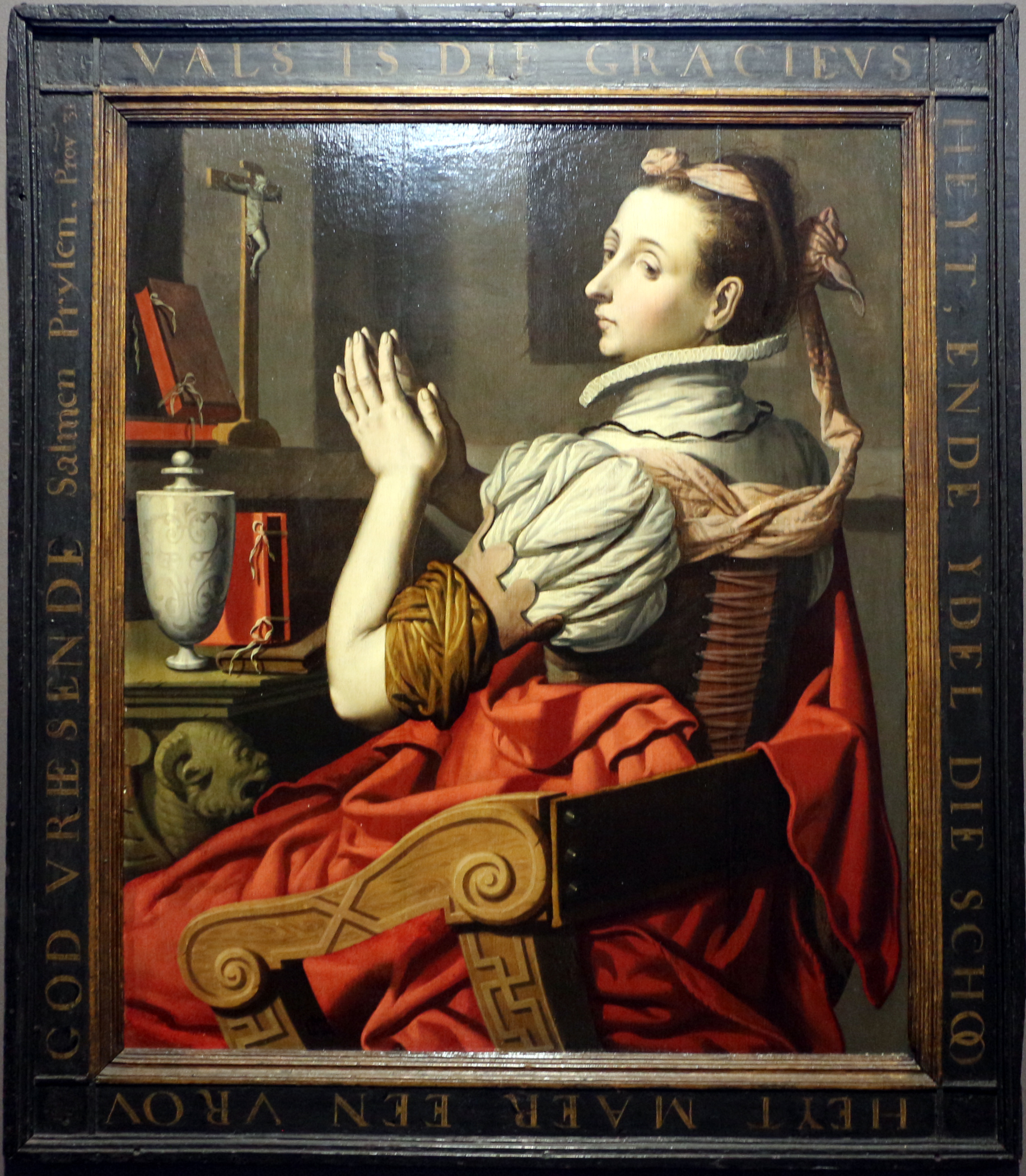
Portrait historié of Magdalena by her husband in the role of her namesake Mary Magdalene

Magdalena Pietersz (before 1560 – after 1592), was a Dutch Renaissance painter.

She was born in Haarlem as the daughter of the glasspainter Pieter Adriaensz, and she married the painter Pieter Pietersz in 1577. In 1585 the couple moved to Amsterdam, where later their son Pieter Pietersz II was baptized in 1592. She is known for market scenes.

She died in Amsterdam.
