= Beukelaer =

Beukelaer or Beuckelaer is a Flemish surname, while De Beukelaer is an independent Belgian surname. Notable people with these names include:

- Edouard de Beukelaer, founder of the biscuit company DeBeukelaer
- Huybrecht Beuckelaer, Flemish Renaissance painter
- Joachim Beuckelaer, Flemish Renaissance painter
- Keith Beukelaer, American Idol contestant

De Beukelaer

- Emile De Beukelaer, Belgian road racing cyclist
- Roger De Beukelaer, Belgian cyclist
- Xavier De Beukelaer, Belgian fencer, also known as Balthasar De Beuckelaer

== See also ==
- François Beukelaers (1938–2026), Belgian actor, stage director and singer
- Jos De Beukelaere (1925–1969), Belgian cyclist
