= The Egg Dance =

Painting by Pieter Aertsen

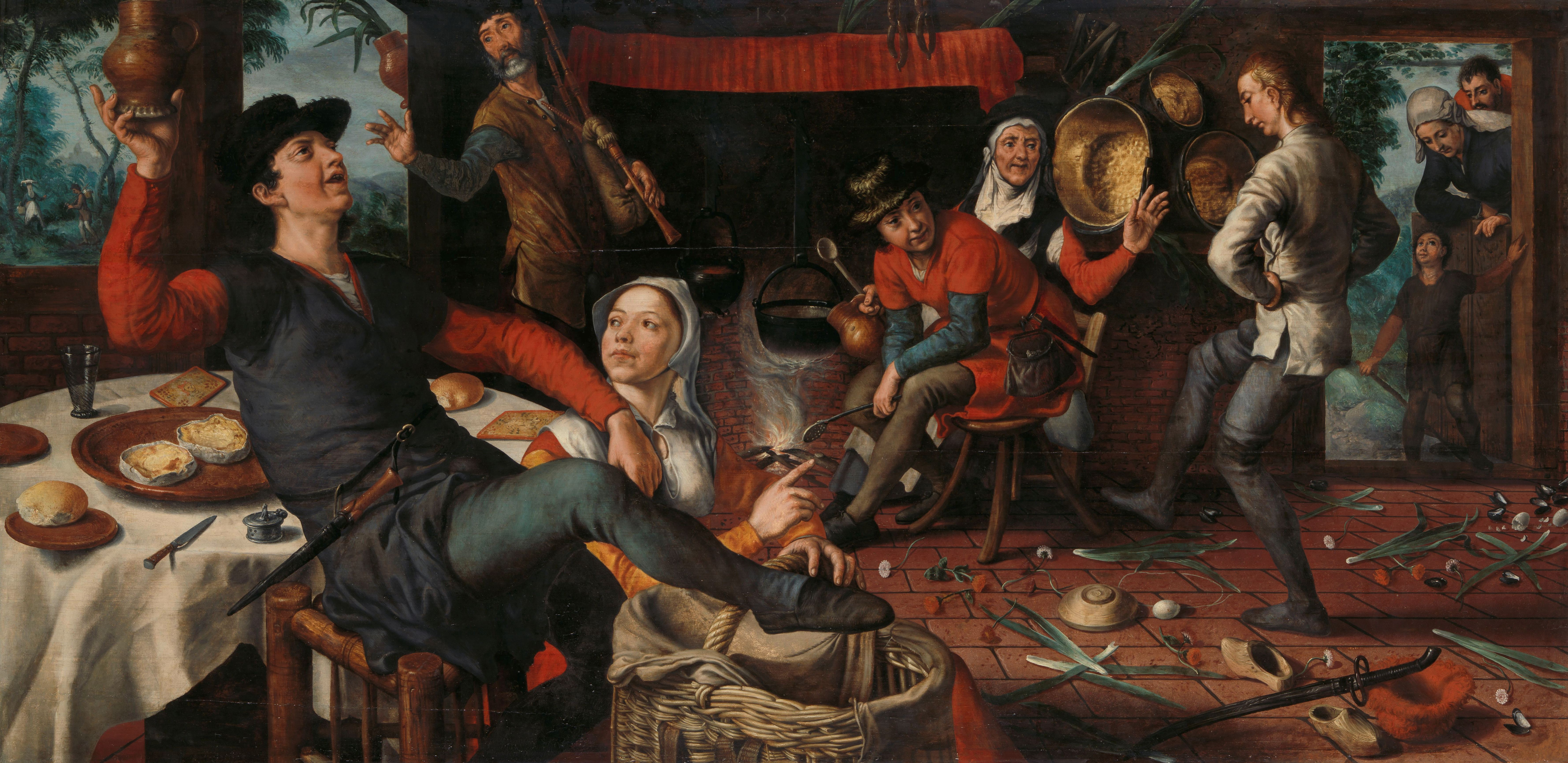
- Artist: Pieter Aertsen
- Year: 1552
- Medium: oil paint, panel
- Dimensions: 84 cm (33 in) × 172 cm (68 in)
- Location: Rijksmuseum, hall 0.6, Netherlands
- Collection: Rijksmuseum
- Accession no.: SK-A-3
- Identifiers: RKDimages ID: 6732; Bildindex der Kunst und Architektur ID: 20016677

The Egg Dance is a 1552 oil on panel genre painting by the Dutch artist Pieter Aertsen, now in the Rijksmuseum in Amsterdam, which bought it in 1839 from the collection of Colonel von Schepeler in Aachen. It depicts preparations for the Easter or carnival custom of an egg dance.
