= Willem Key =

Flemish painter

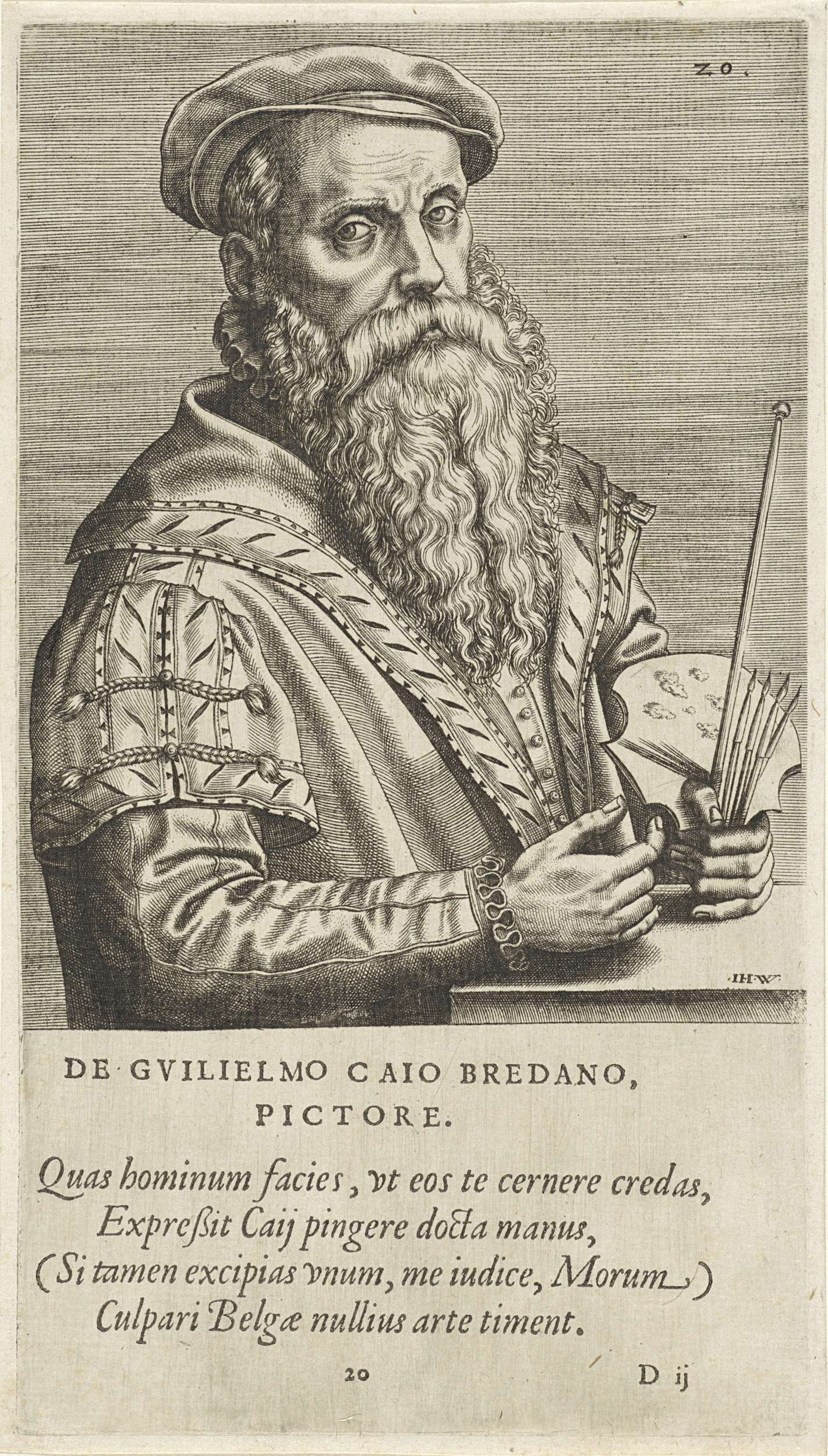
Portrait by Hieronymus Wierix, 1572

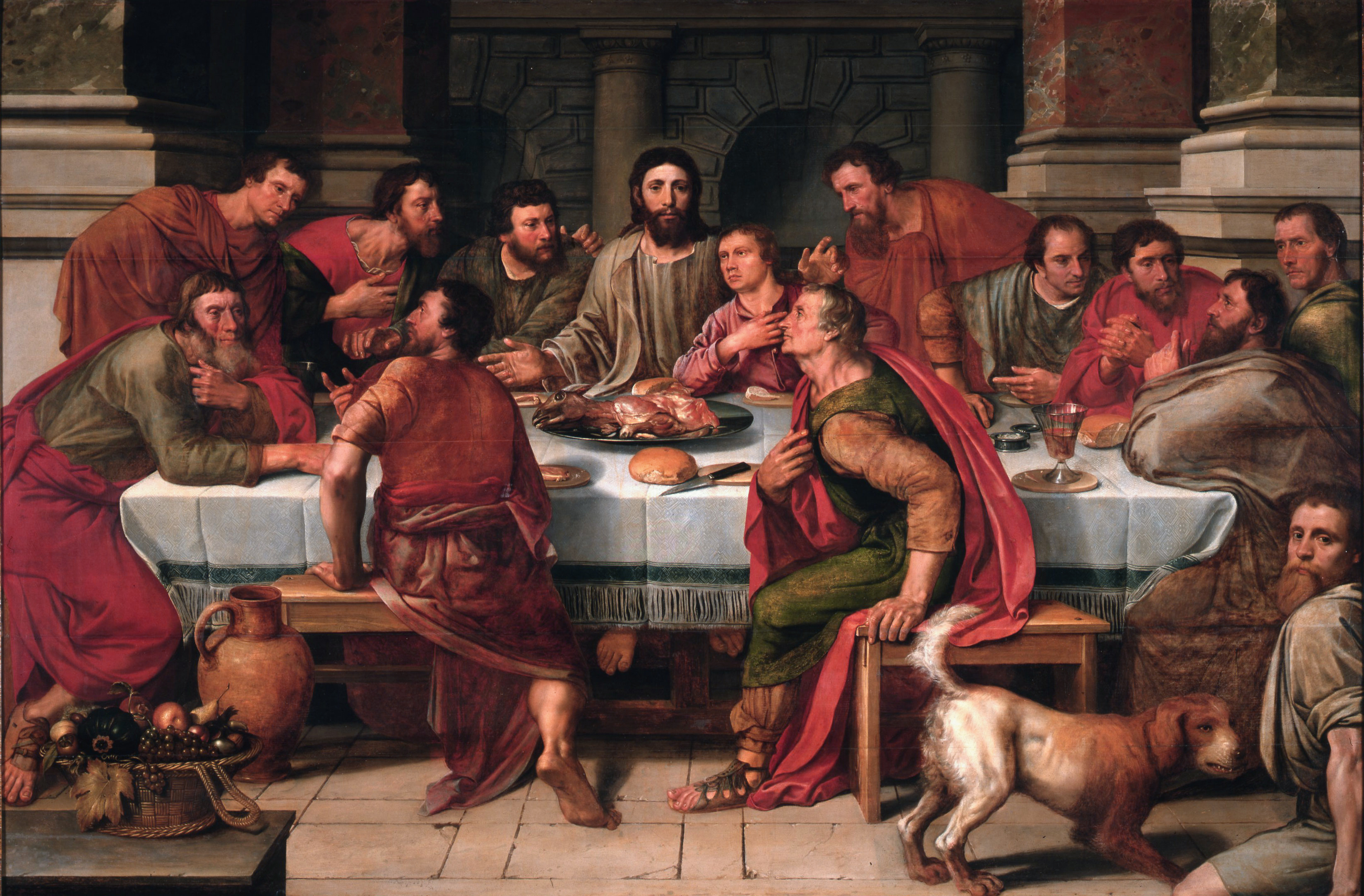
The last Supper, with self-portrait lower right, c. 1560

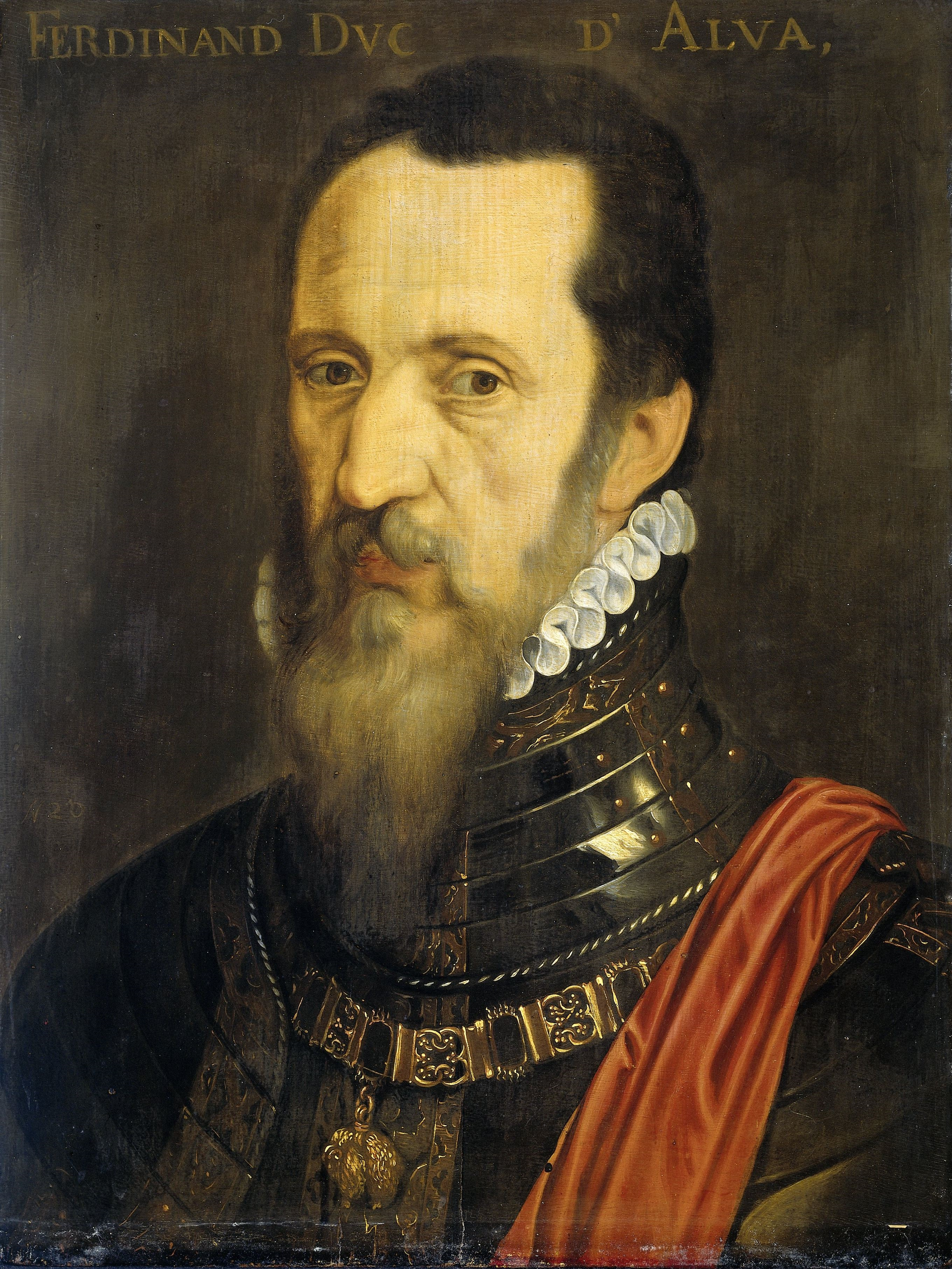
Copy of Willem Key's portrait of Fernando Álvarez de Toledo, Duke of Alba (1507–1582)

Willem Adriaensz Key (1516 – 5 June 1568) was a Flemish Renaissance painter.

== Biography ==
Key was born in Breda, Netherlands. In 1529 he was known to be a pupil of Pieter Coecke van Aelst in Antwerp. Later, together with Frans Floris, he took lessons from Lambert Lombardus in Liège. He became a member of the Guild of St. Luke in Antwerp in 1540. He was a rich man who lived in a large house in the center of town near the exchange. He was married to Johanna Reyns, who after his death remarried to Maarten Peeters II, son of printer Maarten Peeters. Key's daughter Susanna married painter Huybrecht Beuckeleer. He became specialized in flattering portraits and made a good living from theatrically posed group portraits. In van Mander's biography, he mentions several larger pieces by his hand that were burned during the Beeldenstorm. In particular he mentions a destroyed group portrait of the market-sellers on an altar of the Onze-Lieve-Vrouwekathedraal in Antwerp. This could suggest that his painting of the Last Supper in Dordrecht is (based on) a period group portrait of basket weavers and barrel makers, since this painting was commissioned for the altar of St John the Evangelist in the Grote Kerk, Dordrecht, and at that time (c. 1560) St John was the patron saint of the coopers.

== Betrayal - theme of his life as well as of his painting? ==
Karel van Mander goes on to say that while Key was painting Fernando Álvarez de Toledo, Duke of Alba's portrait, he pretended he could not understand foreign speech, and so he overheard the Bloed-raedt plot against the statesmen Lamoral, Count of Egmont and Philip de Montmorency, Count of Hoorn. When these men were executed on the main square in Brussels on 5 June 1568, he was so upset that he died on the same day, in Antwerp. This story was widely accepted as the truth, but van Mander found it hard to believe and thinks he died a few days beforehand. In any case, many of his paintings were destroyed, while he is best known today for his portrait of the Duke of Alva, that was copied many times. The surviving last supper is still in the original frame with a Latin inscription around it with the words of Luke 22:21-23 which are translated as:

But, behold, the hand of him that betrayeth me [is] with me on the table. And truly the Son of man goeth, as it was determined: but woe unto that man by whom he is betrayed! And they began to enquire among themselves, which of them it was that should do this thing. — Luke 22:21-23 KJV

According to the Rijksmuseum, Adriaen Thomasz Key was a distant relation and his pupil.
