= Pieter Pietersz II =

Dutch Golden Age painter

Pieter Pietersz II (1578 in Haarlem – 1631 in Amsterdam), was a Dutch Golden Age painter.

According to Karel van Mander he was the son of Pieter Pietersz the Elder and the grandson of Pieter Aertsen, who painted in the style of his father with the same name.

According to the RKD a few historical allegories survive. He was buried 3 May 1631, in the Oude Kerk. Some of his works may be confused with his father's. He was an uncle of the painter Dirck Santvoort.
