= Pieter Pietersz the Elder =

Dutch Renaissance painter

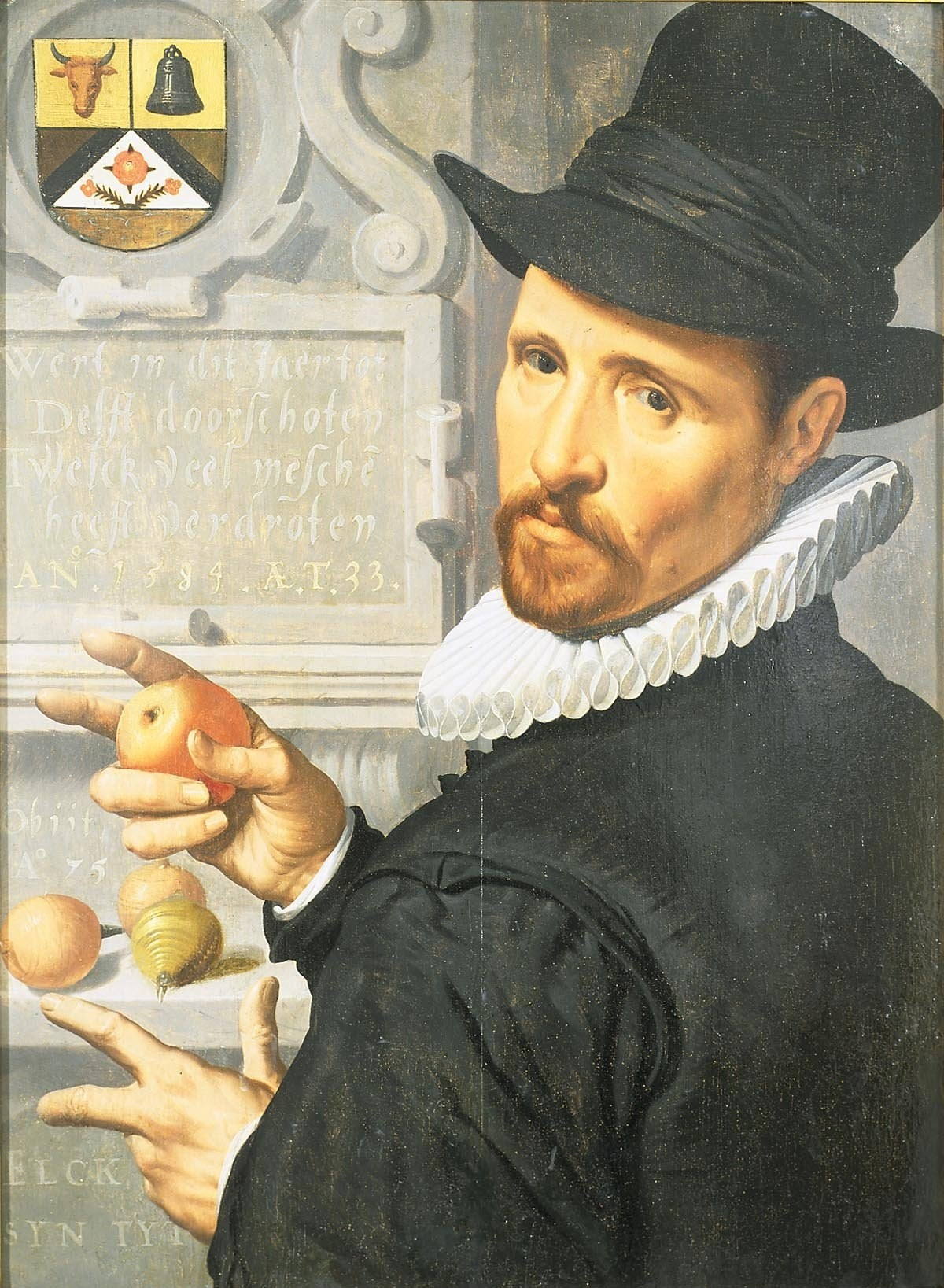
Portrait of Cornelis Cornelisz Schellinger, who was shot in Delft in 1584, and was mourned by many.

Pieter Pietersz the Elder, also Pieter Pietersz. (I), (1540–1603) was a Dutch Renaissance painter.

== Biography ==
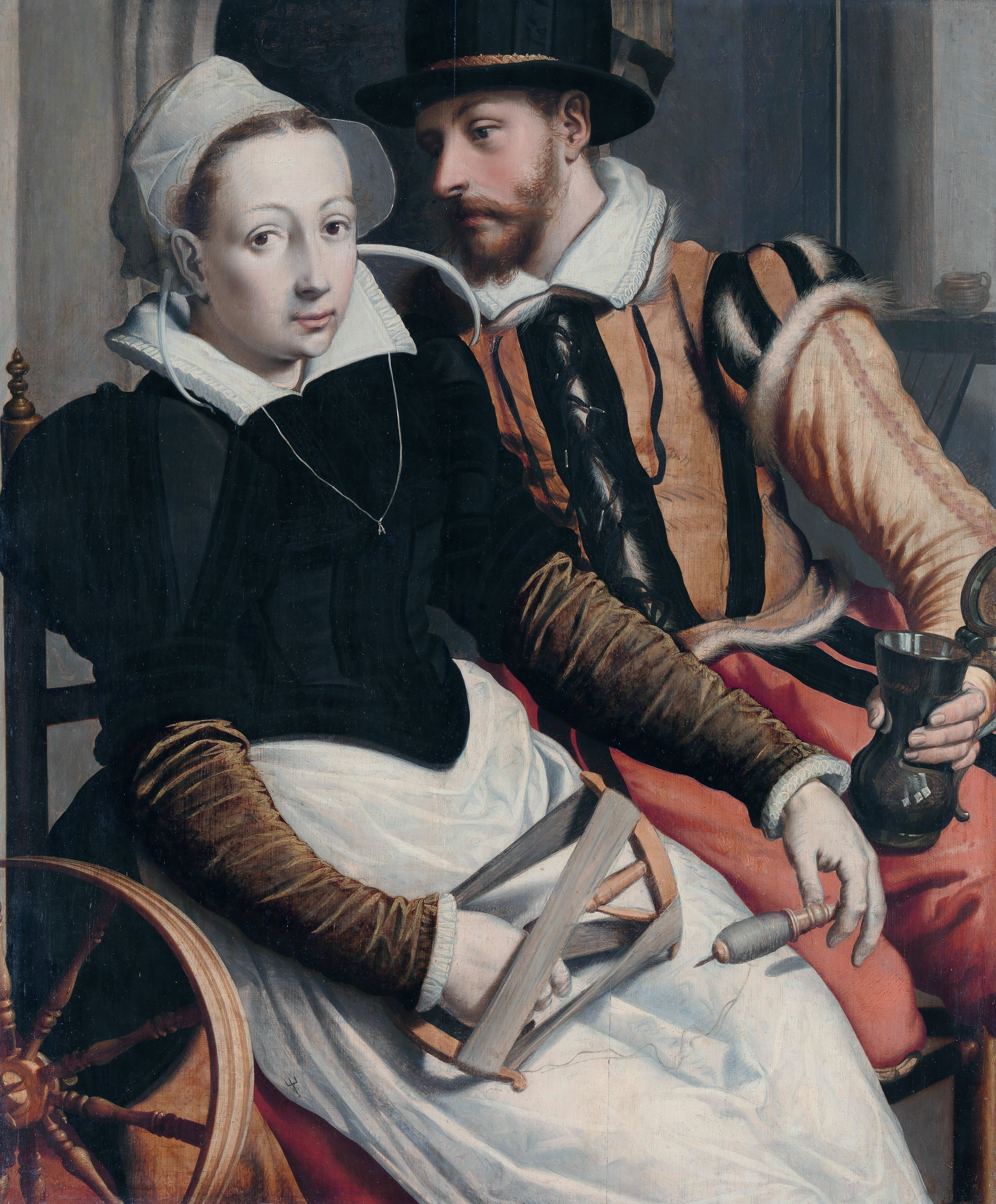
A woman at the spinning wheel and a man with a mug seated in an interior. c. 1560–1570 76 × 63 cm Rijksmuseum Amsterdam Inventory number SK-A-3962

Pietersz was born in Antwerp. According to Karel van Mander, who mentioned him in his biography of his father Pieter Aertsen, he followed in his father's footsteps but took to portrait painting because large commissions were not to be had. Van Mander did mention a large painting for the Baker's guild of Haarlem, which is in the possession of the Frans Hals Museum today, and which Van Mander described as very fiery and original. He died in 1603 at age 62.

According to the Rijksmuseum, he married Magdalena Pietersz, the daughter of a glass painter in Haarlem in 1574.

According to the RKD he was called "Jonge Lange Pier" as the oldest son of the painter Pieter Aertsen ("Lange Pier"). He was the older brother of the painters Aert and Dirk Pietersz, and grandfather of the painter Dirck van Santvoort. From 1569 to 1583 he produced religious scenes in Haarlem, but he is mostly known for his market scenes produced in Amsterdam. He was the teacher of his son, the painter Pieter Pietersz II, and the painter Cornelis van Haarlem. Pietersz primarily painted portraits and altarpieces. He received many commissions and was a wealthy man at the time of his death in Amsterdam.
