= Huybrecht Beuckeleer =

Flemish painter (1535/40–1605/25)

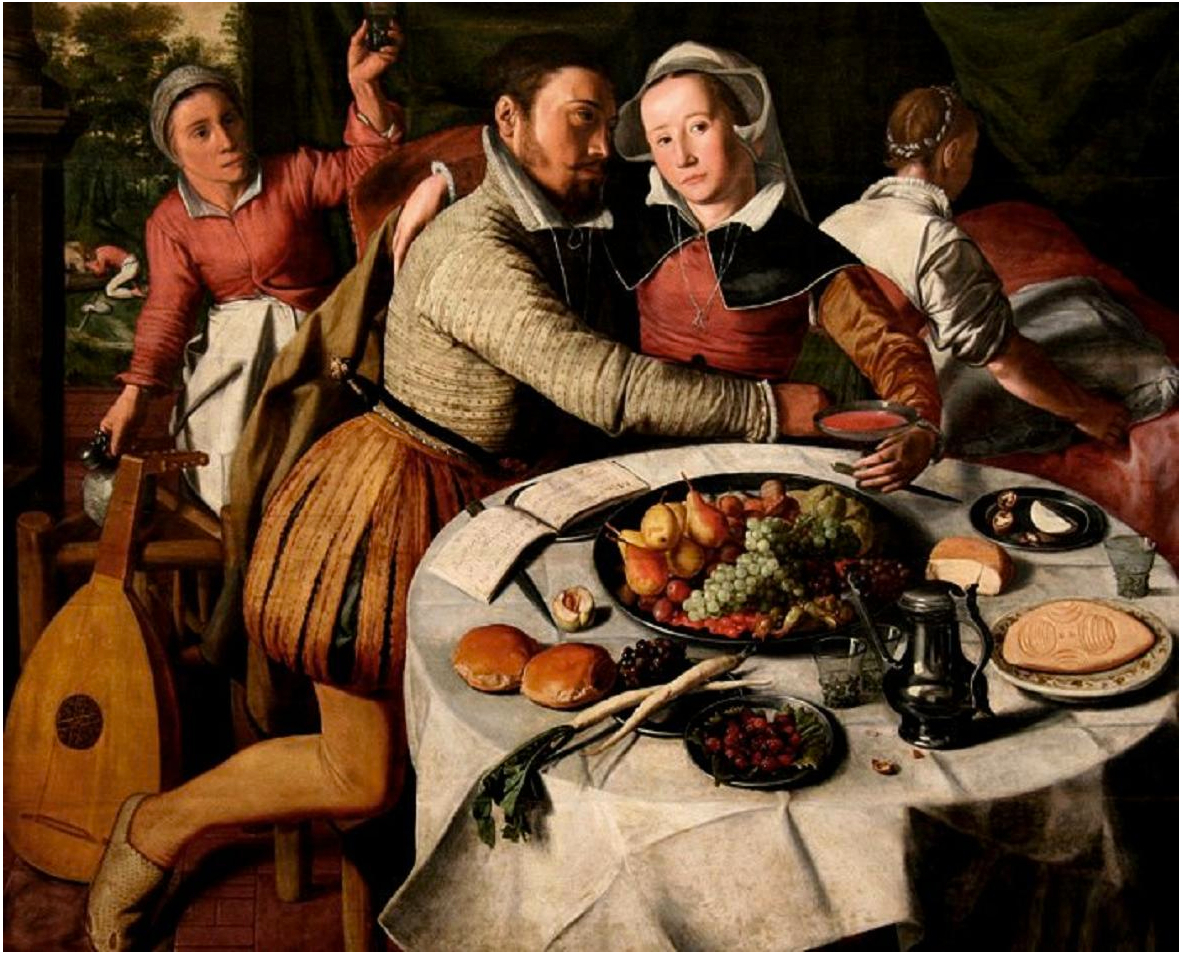
The prodigal son

Huybrecht Beuckeleer or Huybrecht Beuckelaer (1535/40 – 1605/1625) also known as the Monogrammist HB was a Flemish painter of the Northern Renaissance known primarily for his genre paintings, still lifes, and portraits.

Beuckeleer was trained in Antwerp and also worked in Italy, France, and England. In England he served as court painter to Robert Dudley, 1st Earl of Leicester. In 1997, Beuckeleer was identified as the anonymous artist known only by the notname "Monogrammist HB" and as a result more works have been attributed to him. Although the artist only left a small body of work and little is known of him, Beuckeleer nevertheless played a role in the overall development of genre and still life painting in Northern Europe.

== Life ==
Biographical details concerning the artist remain scarce. It is known that Huybrecht Beuckeleer was born to a family of painters between the years 1535 and 1540 in Antwerp, in what was at that time the Habsburg Netherlands. His father, Mattheus Beuckelaer, was registered as a master in the Antwerp Guild of Saint Luke in 1535. Huybrecht is believed to have been the brother of Joachim Beuckelaer, a prominent genre painter specifically of kitchen and market scenes. His father's sister, Kathelijne, was married to Pieter Aertsen, a Dutch painter active in Antwerp who was likewise known for his market and kitchen scenes.

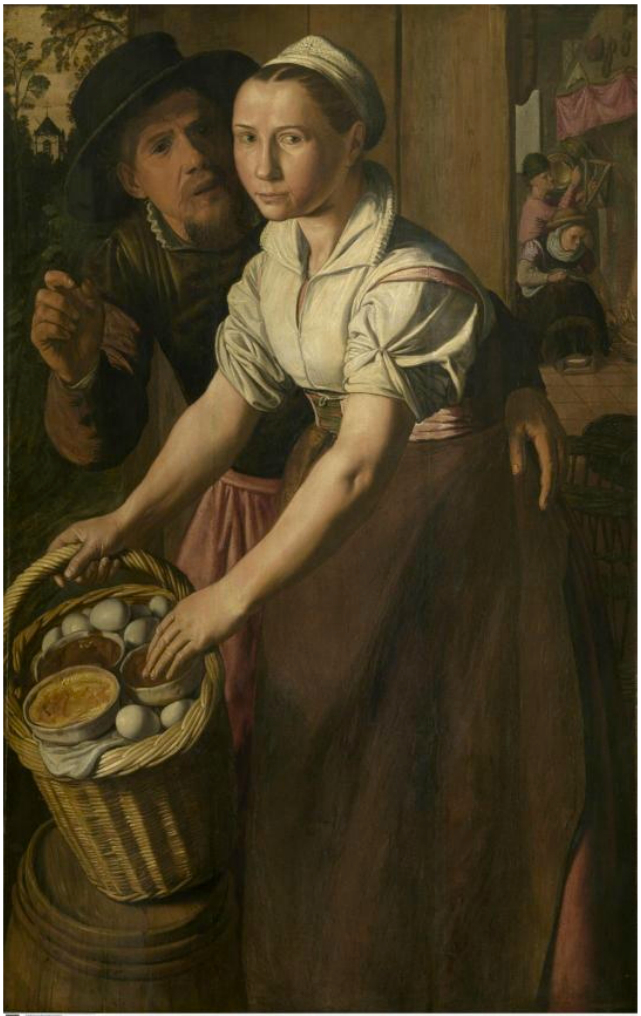
The egg seller

Initially, Huybrecht Beuckeleer most likely studied under his father. He is presumed also to have trained in the workshop of his uncle Pieter Aertsen. By the early 1560s, Aertsen had left for Amsterdam. Huybrecht 's brother Joachim operated at that time a successful workshop in which he produced kitchen and market scenes. While there is uncertainty about the role of Huybrecht in his brother's workshop, it is clear that the early works of both brothers were heavily influenced by Aertsen in style as well as subject matter. It is known that both Huybrecht and his brother collaborated with Antonis Mor for day wages.

There is evidence of extensive travel in the period 1567–68. Huybrecht was mentioned in Antwerp in January 1567, but not long thereafter he was said have departed, to be "travelling in various foreign countries in order to see the land and learn the language, and to practise his trade as a painter and thus earn his living". It has been suggested, based on stylistic grounds, that Huybrecht may have trained in Bronzino's workshop in Florence as early as the mid-1550s, though there is no documentary evidence to support this hypothesis.

In September 1568, Huybrecht Beuckeleer had returned to Antwerp, where he married Anna Lambrechts and had a son by her, Daniel Beuckeleer. However, his wife was recorded as deceased in April 1569. Huybrecht inherited a rent on a house from her. He had to buy out the inheritance of his son Daniel on 14 April 1569. In 1574, there is a record of him sending from Bordeaux a letter to the mother of his first wife telling her that he is faring better there than in Antwerp.

Beuckeleer returned to Antwerp in October 1577 when he sold the rent he had inherited from his first wife. That same year he was married again, this time to Susanna Key; the daughter of the painter Willem Key. In was only in 1579 that Beuckeleer would become an independent master in the Antwerp Guild of Saint Luke.

The artist was last mentioned in Antwerp in 1585, after which, coinciding with the Fall of Antwerp, Beuckeleer moved to England. Here he was likely active as a portrait artist and probably worked for the Earl of Leicester. Huybrecht Beuckeleer was mentioned in a document, probably published in 1586, listing of the names of people from the Low Countries. In the list he is referred to as "Hubert Bücheler (or Hubert Bucheler) in Greenwich". The Earl of Leicester, who was possibly his last patron, died in 1605. A picture maker by the name of Daniel Buckler is also mentioned in a list of foreign artists as having died in London in 1625, believed to have been his son.

== Work ==
=== Rediscovery ===
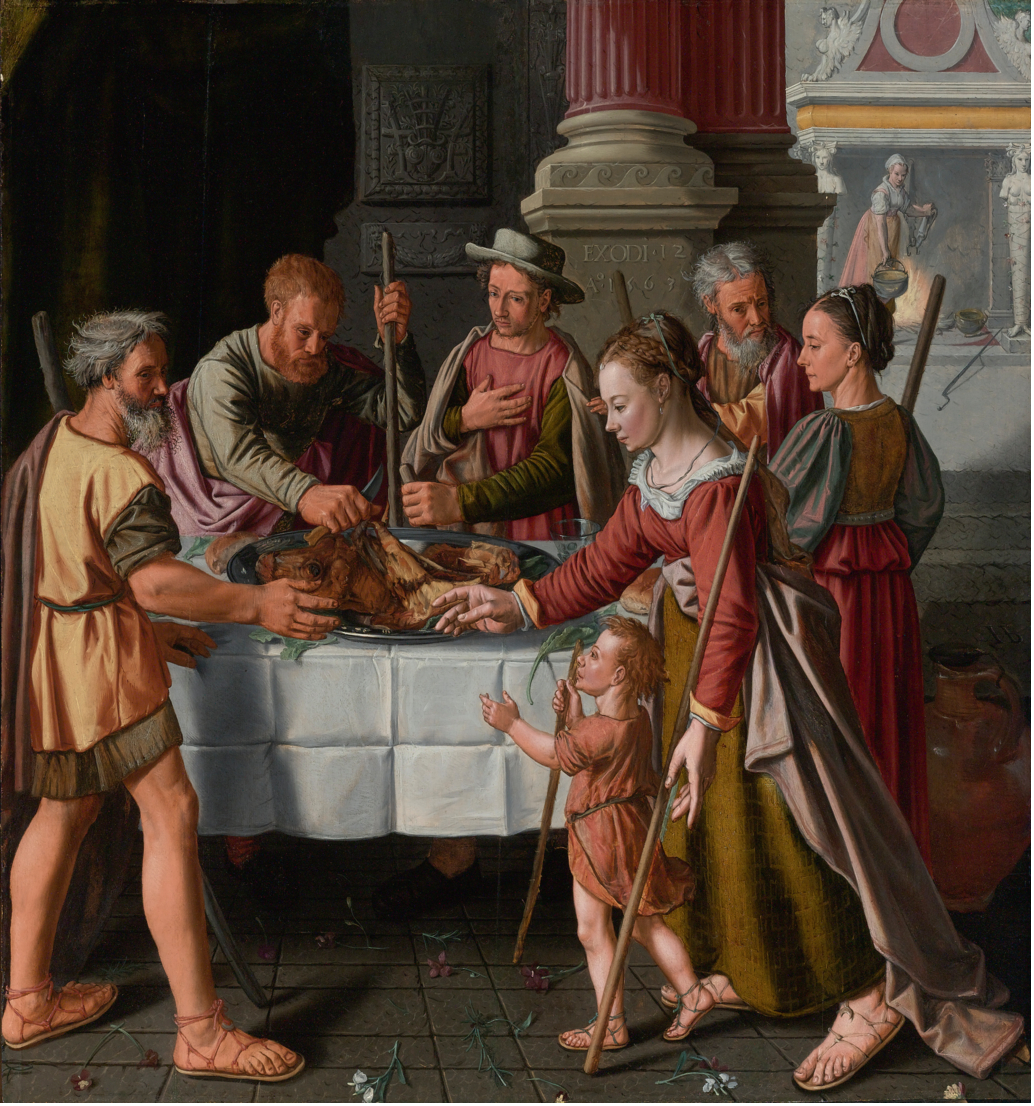
The first Passover feast

The art historian Johannes Sievers had identified a small group of works with certain stylistic idiosyncrasies and classified them under the notname the Monogrammist HB in 1911 (J. Sievers, Joachim Bueckeleer, in: Jahrbuch der preußischen Kunstsammlungen, 32, 1911, pp. 210–212). The work and artistic personality of the artist given this notname were first defined in 1976 by the art historian Detlev Kreidl in his analysis of the Prodigal Son Feasting with harlots (the Royal Museums of Fine Arts of Belgium, Brussels) and The kitchen maid and her helpers (in the same museum). The two works had been attributed over the years to both Joachim Beuckelaer and Aertsen. The two paintings were found to bear the monogram HB and in 1997 infra-red reflectography conducted on The kitchen maid and her helpers revealed the signature 'Beuckler' and a date of 1570 or 1676 next to the already familiar monogram HB. Based on this discovery Kreidl was able to identify the 'Monogrammist HB' as Huybrecht Beuckeleer. The first Passover feast (Sotheby's New York sale, 26 January 2012, lot 105) is another painting previously attributed to Joachim that was reattributed to Huybrecht.

Only about half a dozen paintings have been attributed to Huybrecht Beuckeleer. His small output is likely attributable to the fact that he worked for others or in the workshop of other artists. Only a few of his works are clearly dated:The first Passover feast (Sotheby's New York sale, 26 January 2012, lot 105) and The Holy Family with Saint Anne (sale Dorotheum, Vienna, 19 April 2016, lot 34) are both dated 1563. The kitchen maid and her helpers has a date of either 1570 or 1576.

The subject matter of Huybrecht is similar to that of his brother Joachim and Aertsen and includes kitchen and market scenes as well as some religious compositions and portraits. A still life has also been attributed to the artist.

=== Style characteristics ===
Sievers had in 1911 already identified the main differences between the works of Huybrecht (whom he knew as the Monogrammist HB) and his brother Joachim. The distinctive traits identified by Sievers point to a greater realism and naturalness in Huybrecht's work when compared to that of his brother. Sievers found Huybrecht's treatment of the human body to display a higher degree of three-dimensionality and detail and his figures to be more individualized in the treatment of the head. Huybrecht further adopted a freer treatment of certain details such as the hair and beards. His figures are placed in a more relaxed arrangement and their gestures and movements appear to be more fluent and naturalistic. Detlev Kreindl expanded on Sievers' earlier conclusions in 1976. Kreidl highlighted that Huybrecht's figures are more statuesque and sculptural in handling. Kreidl also posited a similarity between Huybrecht's works and portraits from the circle of the Florentine painter Bronzino. It is precisely the sculptural treatment of his figures and the crisp modelling of the faces, which are regarded as evidence of the influence of the Florentine master. Kreidl suggests that possibly he trained in Bronzino's workshop as early as the mid-1550s. On the basis of these characteristics Kreidl reattributed two portraits (art market) previously given to Santi di Tito to Huybrecht.

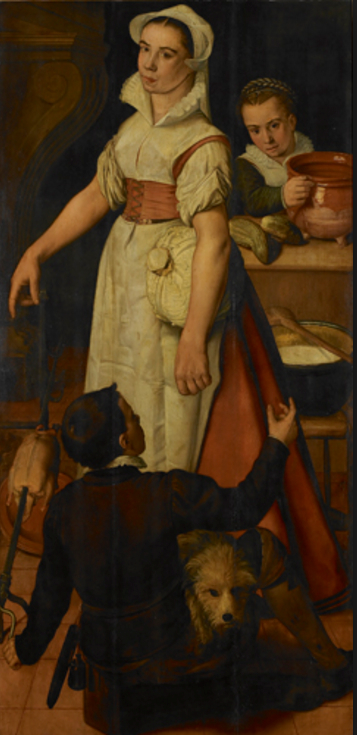
The kitchen maid and her helpers

In their energetic and bold drawing of the main outlines of their compositions the brothers also show their common artistic background. Huybrecht's handling of various textures and patterns also suggests the influence of Anthonis Mor, with whom he is believed to have collaborated in the early 1560s in Antwerp. A Portrait of a man in the Mauritshuis in The Hague is signed and dated 'Mor 1561'. It is generally believed that only the head was painted by Mor while the rest was finished by an assistant in his workshop. It has been suggested that that assistant could be Huybrecht Beuckelaer because of his particular skill in rendering fabrics.

The first Passover feast (Sotheby's New York sale, 26 January 2012, lot 105) illustrates Huybrecht's technique. In this work he employed a formula already used by Aertsen in the early 1550s. It is characterised by the high viewpoint, which allows every aspect of the scene, in this case, the Passover Feast, to be explained in detail. The scale of the composition is relatively large and the figures are almost lifelike positioned in the immediate foreground. These traits clearly show his indebtedness to the colorful naturalism of Aertsen's later works of this type. The scene is dominated by the large figures who are distributed on all levels of the pictorial space and connected by eye contact and individual gestures. Huybrechts demonstrates in this picture that he could give a more elegant and idealized treatment of figures than Aertsen's or his brother Joachim.

=== Market and kitchen scenes ===
The market and kitchen scenes showing the lavish produce available in Antwerp at the time have often been interpreted as showcasing the prosperity of Antwerp, the then most important trading port in the Netherlands. Others see the compositions as satirical and bearing a moralistic intention. Some commentators have pointed to the erotic tension between the various actors in the scenes. For instance, the composition The kitchen maid and her helpers shows a cook standing in front of a fireplace, while she holds a big cabbage under her left arm and her right hand points to a chicken on a spit. A kitchen boy sitting at her feet on a bench with a dog on his lap is turning the spit. With his right hand he points to a young kitchen helper behind the kitchen maid. This young helper is placing a pot on a kitchen counter and is returning the boy's gaze. The kitchen interior is unmistakably dominated by erotic tension between the kitchen boy and the older kitchen maid. The big dog in the lap of the kitchen boy refers to his sexual desire while various comical and farcical foods, such as the rotisserie chicken, the cauldron of porridge, the cucumbers and the large cabbage under the arm of the kitchen maid indicate that she is available. In The egg seller another popular theme of Flemish genre art is depicted: that of the unequal love between an older man and a younger woman.

His Prodigal son feasting with harlots is not only a kitchen style scene but also falls in the category of the 'loose company' or 'merry company' painting genre developed earlier in the century by Jan Sanders van Hemessen. Beuckeleer depicts the subject in the form of a rendezvous between an elegantly dressed young couple sitting at a table. On the table a lavish still life is displayed, adding to the impression of upscale taste. The elegant man has clearly started his wooing earlier by playing the lute at his side. However, the actions of the servants makes clear that the true nature of the setting is that of a brothel rather than that of an upscale dwelling. Like Jan Sanders van Hemessen did in his earlier treatment of this subject, Beuckeleer included in his picture another scene from the biblical story of the prodigal son: in the background on the left the prodigal son is seen eating pig swill after he has squandered his inheritance and fallen on hard times.

=== Still life ===
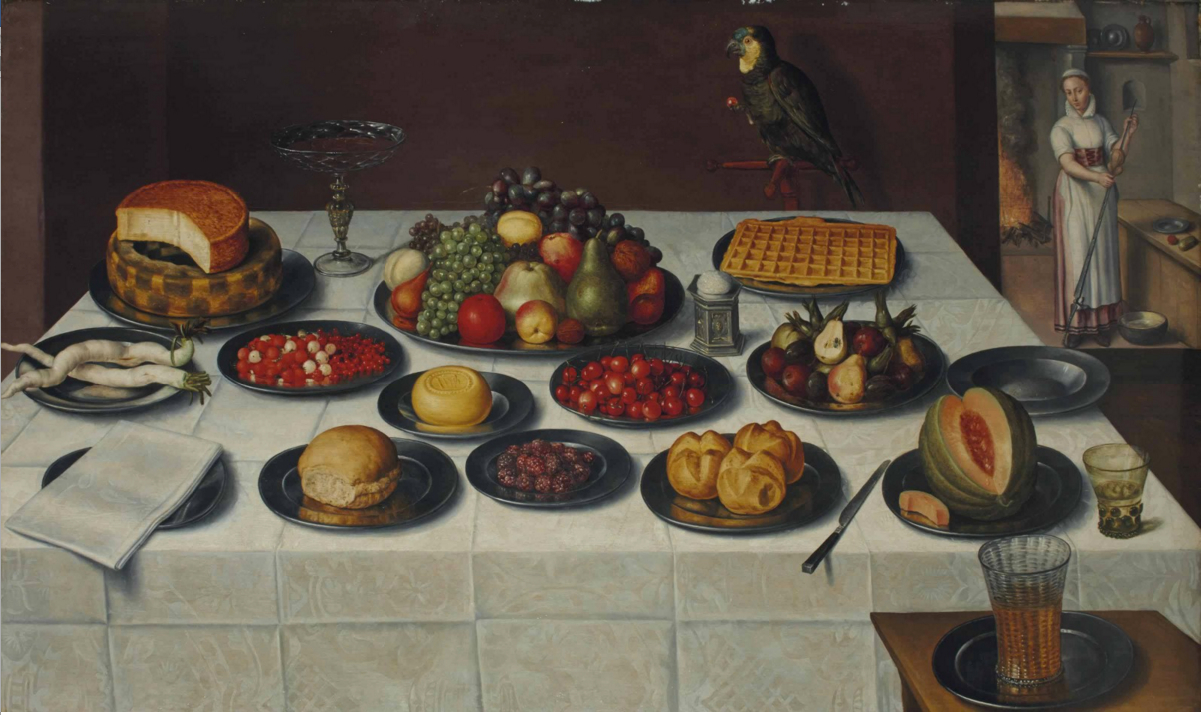
Still life

A still life referred to as Blackberries, cherries, pears, melons and other fruits, parsnips, bread, cheese and a waffle, roemer, tazza and salt cellar on a draped table (At Christie's on 16 October 2013 in Paris lot 69) has been attributed to Huybrecht Beuckeleer on the basis of the similarities with the still life included in the Prodigal son feasting with harlots of the Royal Museums of Fine Arts in Brussels.

This still life makes clear that Huybrecht Beuckeleer played a role in the development of the genre of still life painting in the 16th century. In its skilfully organized and balanced composition this still life shows him to be independent from Aertsen's models. This still life prefigures the later works of Floris van Dyck (circa 1575–1651) and Nicolaes Gillis (1595-around 1632).
