= Maarten Peeters =

Flemish painter

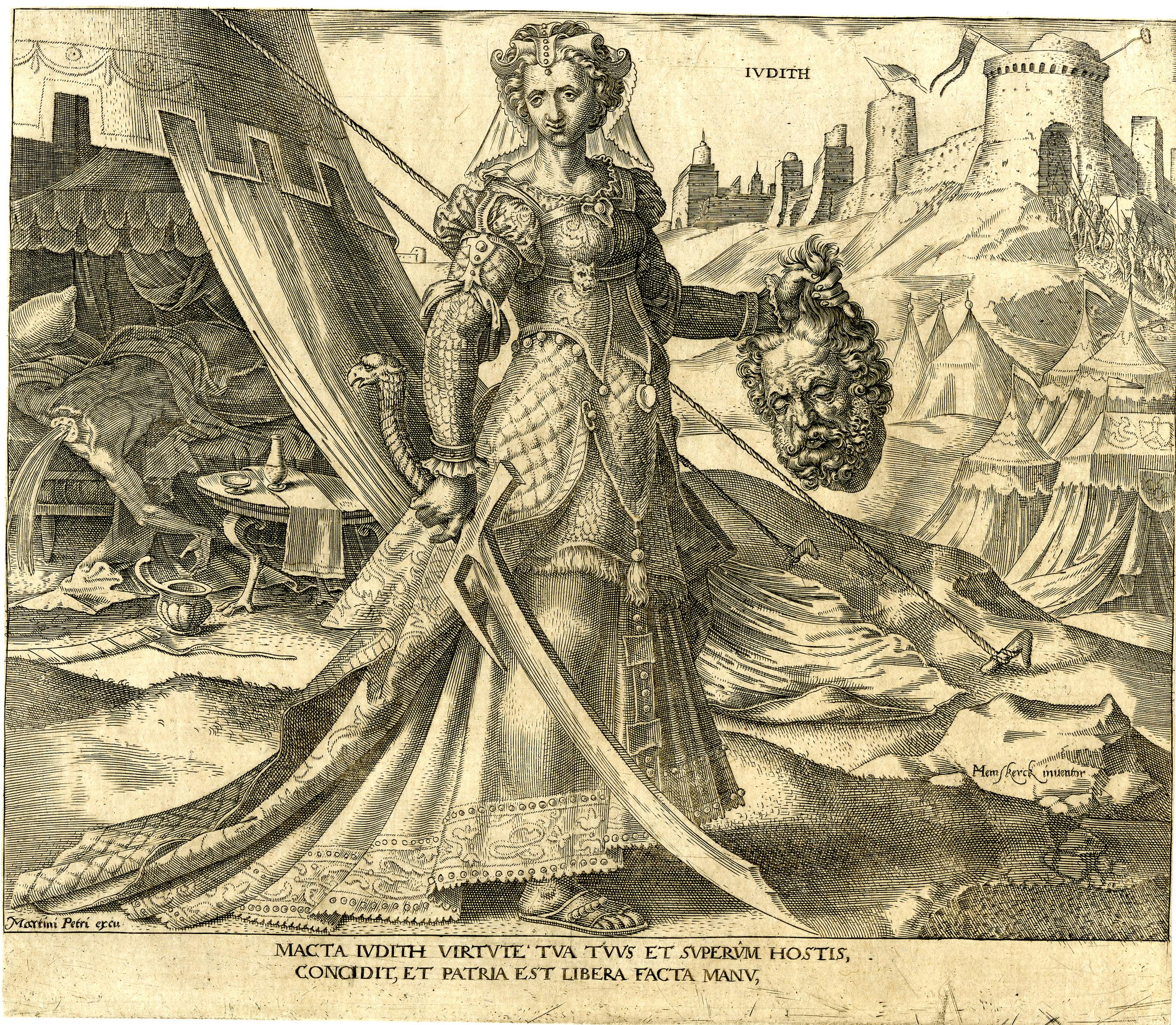
Engraving of Judith inscribed Martini Petri excu in the left corner

Maarten Peeters or Marten Peeters van Ghelle (c. 1500 – 1566) was a Flemish painter, print publisher and dealer active in Antwerp.

Peeters was born in Geel, Duchy of Brabant, around 1500. He was also called Martinus Petri, Merten Peters, and Marteen van Gheele. He moved to Antwerp, where he was active as a painter, print publisher and dealer. He was a member of the guild of traders (Meerseniers) in 1524/25. The following year he was reported as part of Antwerp's Guild of Saint Luke as a painter. He was the guild's dean in 1533, 1546, 1558. He was dean five times overall between 1533 and 1559. His son, Maarten II, was reported as wijnmeester, i.e. son of a master.

He was active as a publisher in the 1550s and 1560s. He was particularly interested in French and Italian art. He published plates after Francesco Primaticcio and works of Flemish artists influenced by the Italian style, and, among other things, republished nearly all the plates by Lucas van Leyden. He became the legal guardian of two sons of Pieter Coecke van Aelst, Michiel and future painter Pieter II. He was their warden through their minority.

He married Marie Jansdochter, daughter of Jan van der Haer and Gheertruyde Diericks Coevoet. His son, Maarten Peeters II, also a painter, married Johanna Reyns, the widow of painter Willem Key. Maarten II may have continued his father's business.

He died in Antwerp after 1565, probably around 1566 or shortly before.

== Sources ==
- Rombouts, Ph.; van Lerius, Th. (1961). De Liggeren en andere historische archieven der Antwerpsche Sint Lucasgilde Les Liggeren et autres archives historiques de la Gilde Anversoise de Saint Luc vol. 1. Amsterdam: Israël. pp. 103, 119, 133, 136, 155, 207.
- Thieme, Ulrich; Becker, Felix (1933). Allgemeines Lexikon der bildenden Künstler : von der Antike bis zur Gegenwart vol. 27. Leipzig: Seeman.
- Wouk, E.H. (April 2015). Maarten Peeters, publisher at the Sign of the Golden Fountain. Delineavit et Sculpsit no. 38.
