= Joost van Geel =

Dutch Golden Age genre painter

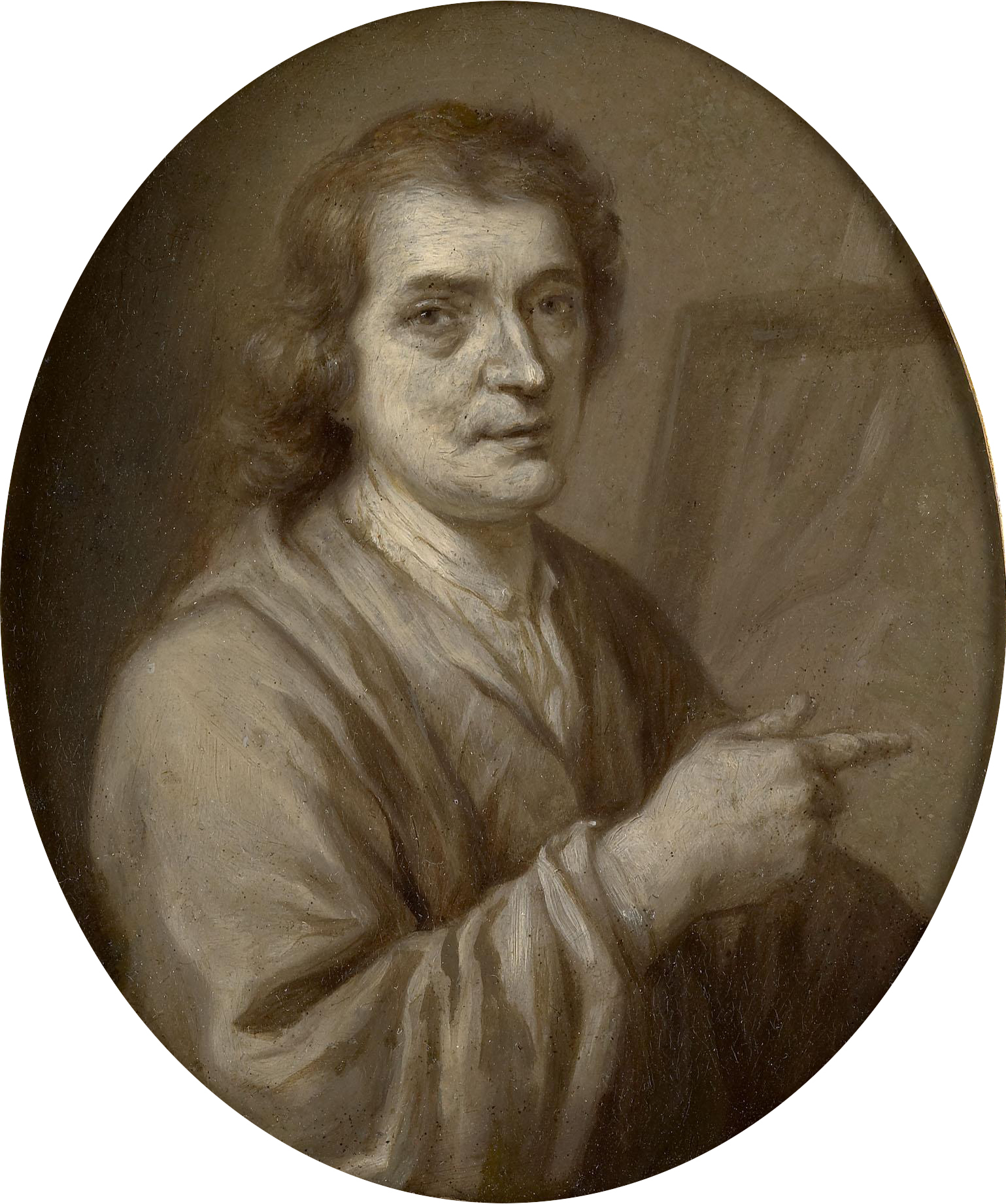
Grisaille portrait of Van Geel by Jacob Houbraken after a painting by Jan Maurits Quinkhard, who copied it from a self-portrait now in the Rotterdam historical museum "Het Schielandshuis".

Joost van Geel (1631, Rotterdam – 1698, Rotterdam), was a Dutch Golden Age genre painter in the style of Gabriel Metsu.

== Biography ==
According to Jacob Houbraken, he was never able to discover more about this painter than what he learned from a painting of a lady with a nanny and child, which he described thus: "A piece has come to my attention signed V. Geel, which shows a nanny with a child on her lap, and a mother standing at her side with a red "sulp" jacket edged in white fur quite cleverly wrapped around her, and a yellow satin skirt with natural folds, playing with the child, as if she wanted to tempt her from her nanny with a lump of sugar. I don't know if this artist was a pupil of Metzu, but the piece was so cleverly done in his manner that it could be taken for a work by his hand. I have not seen any other work by this artist and all those of whom I ask of him have never heard of him or his work, which leads me to believe that many brave souls are nipped in the bud from a lack of patronage." This piece today shows the "V. Geel" signature with the "L" connected to a (forged) "Metsu" signature.

According to the RKD, he was a pupil of Metsu and worked in Leiden, Germany, France, London, and Rijnsburg before returning to Rotterdam sometime after 1666. Van Geel's painting of a lacemaker wearing a similar red "sulp" jacket was recently discovered and broadcast on the Dutch antiques television program "Tussen Kunst en Kitsch" in 2011 and valued at around 250,000 euro.

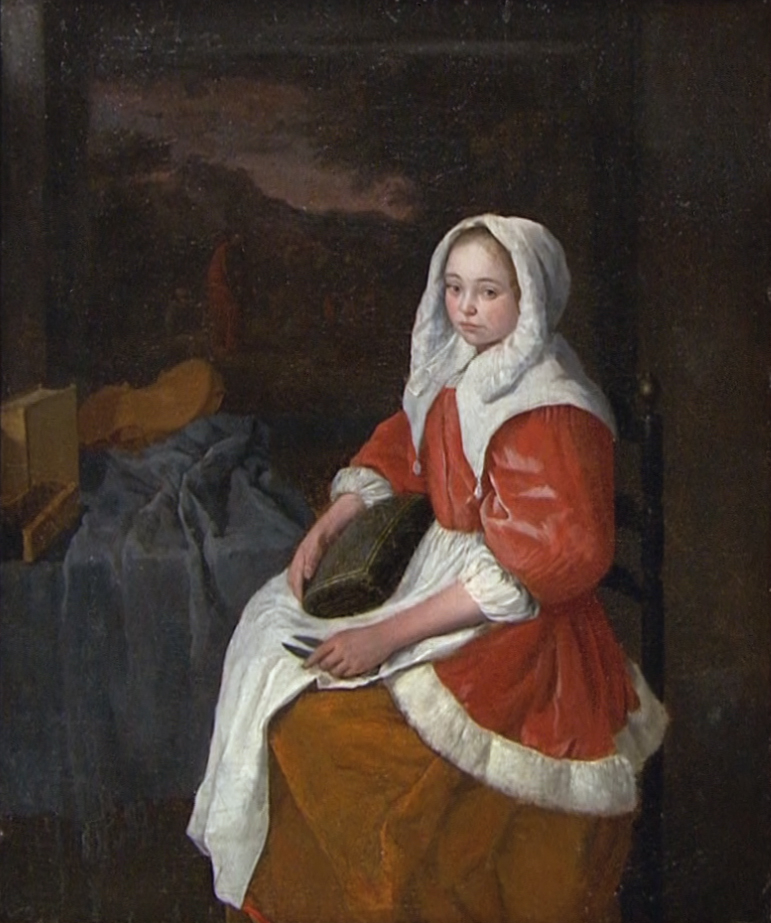
Painting from the Antiques Roadshow

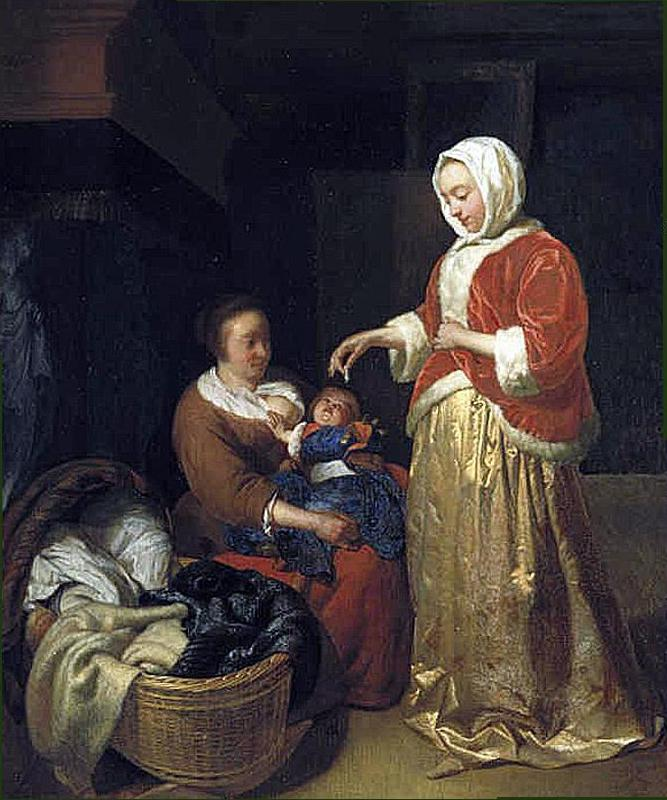
Painting that Houbraken described
