= 1610 in art =

Events from the year 1610 in art.

== Events ==
- Caravaggio begins his journey from Naples home to Rome, where he is to receive a pardon from the Pope through the intercession of Cardinal Scipione Borghese; however, Caravaggio never arrives in Rome.
- Stained glass windows installed in the chapel of Hatfield House are the first in the country since the start of the English Reformation.

== Works ==
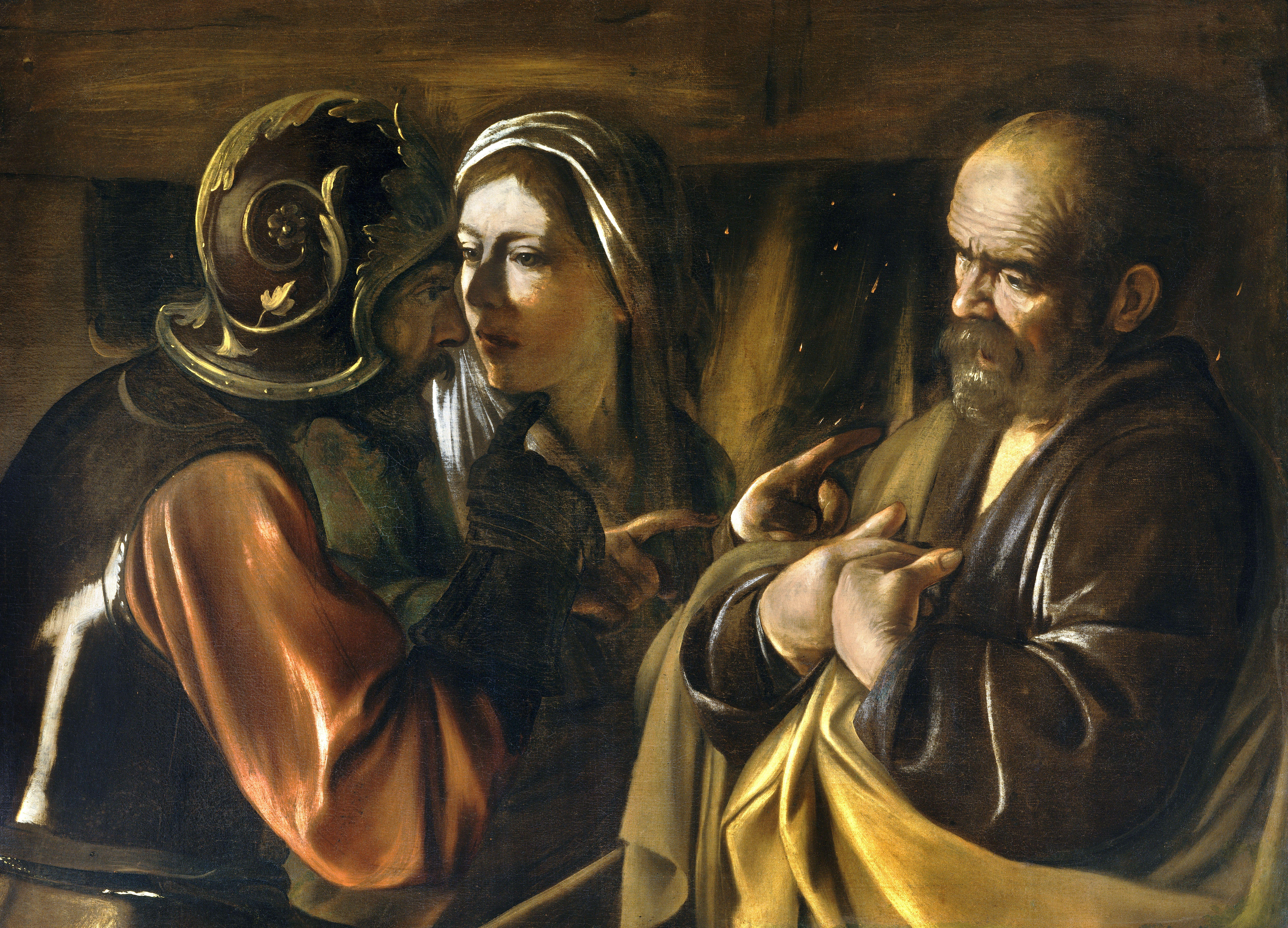
Caravaggio, The Denial of Saint Peter

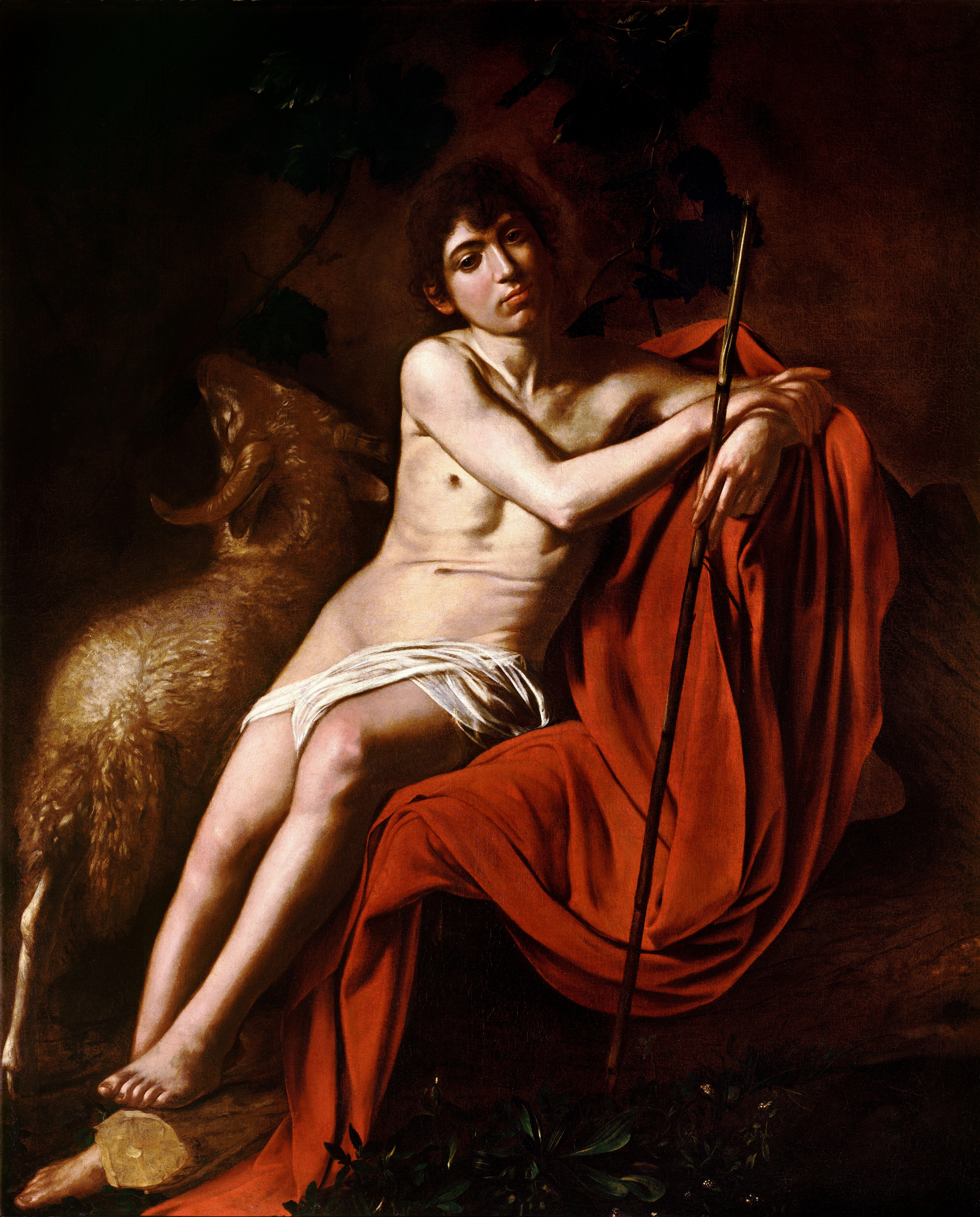
Caravaggio, John the Baptist

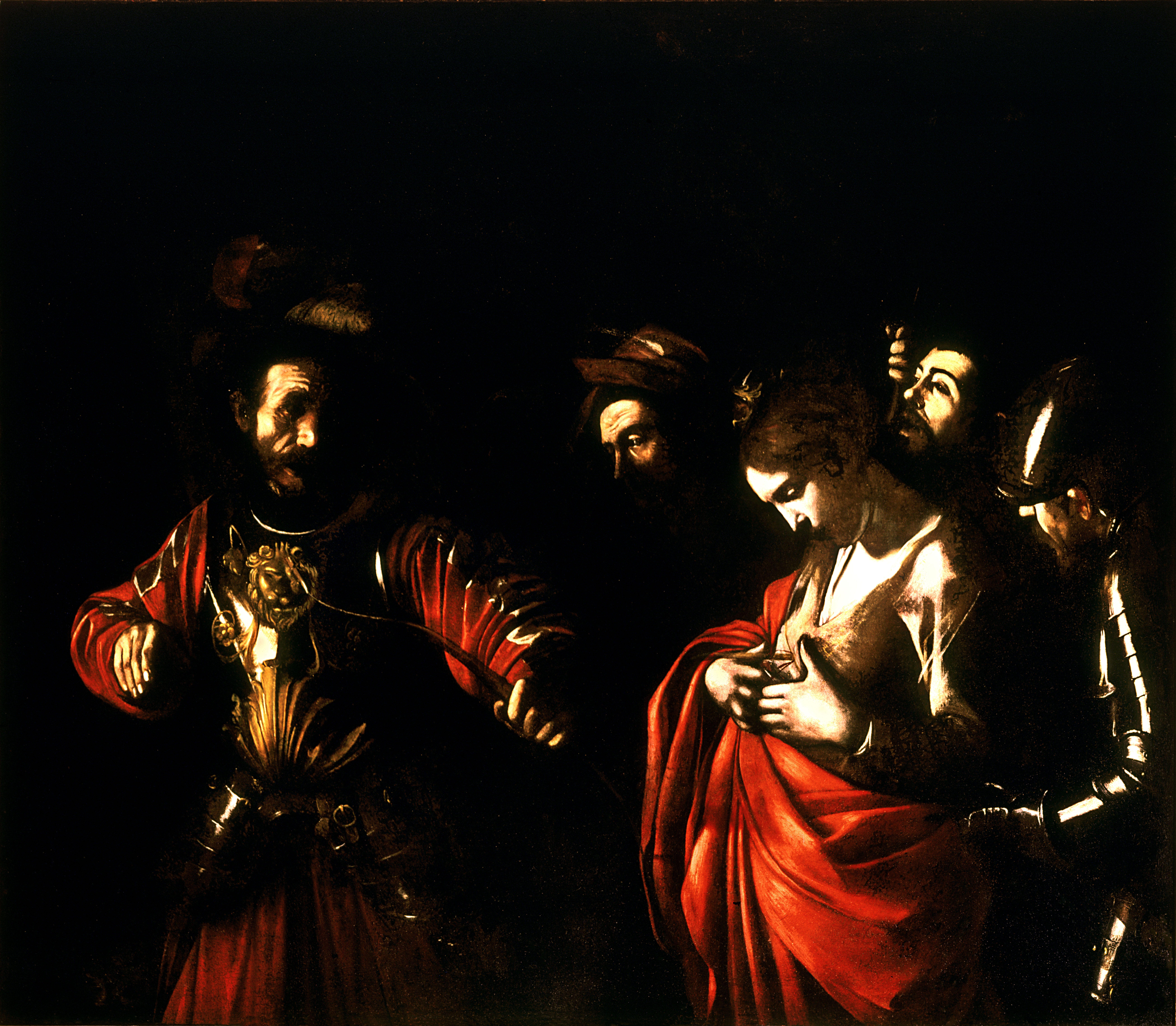
Caravaggio, The Martyrdom of Saint Ursula

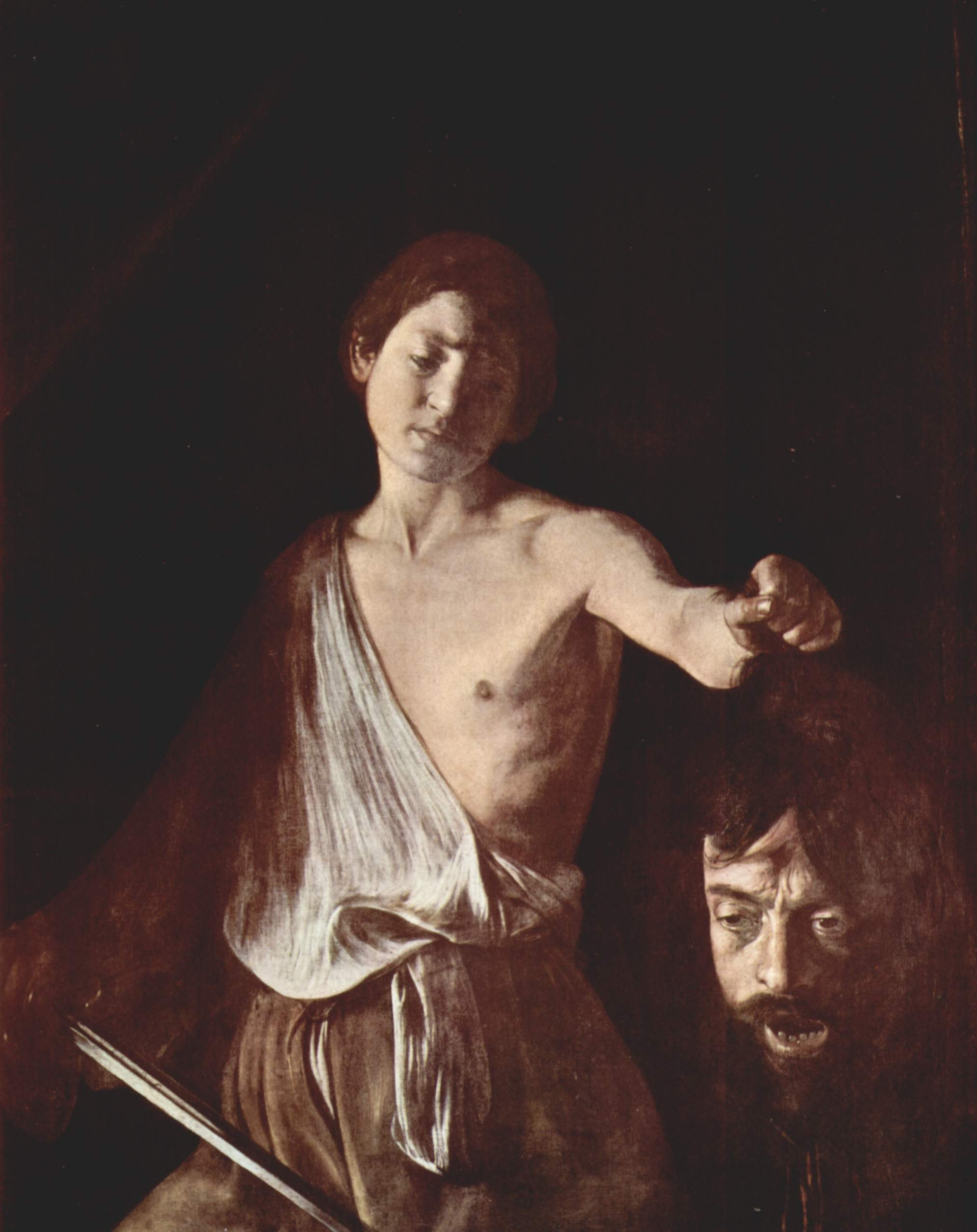
Caravaggio, David with the Head of Goliath

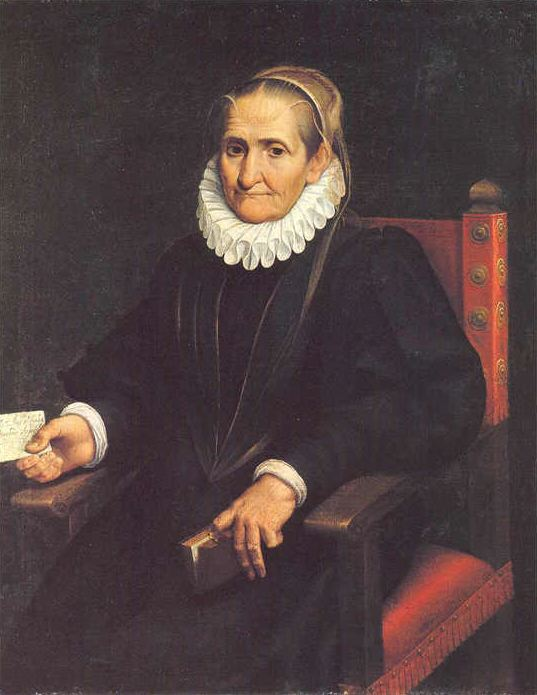
Sofonisba Anguissola, Self-portrait

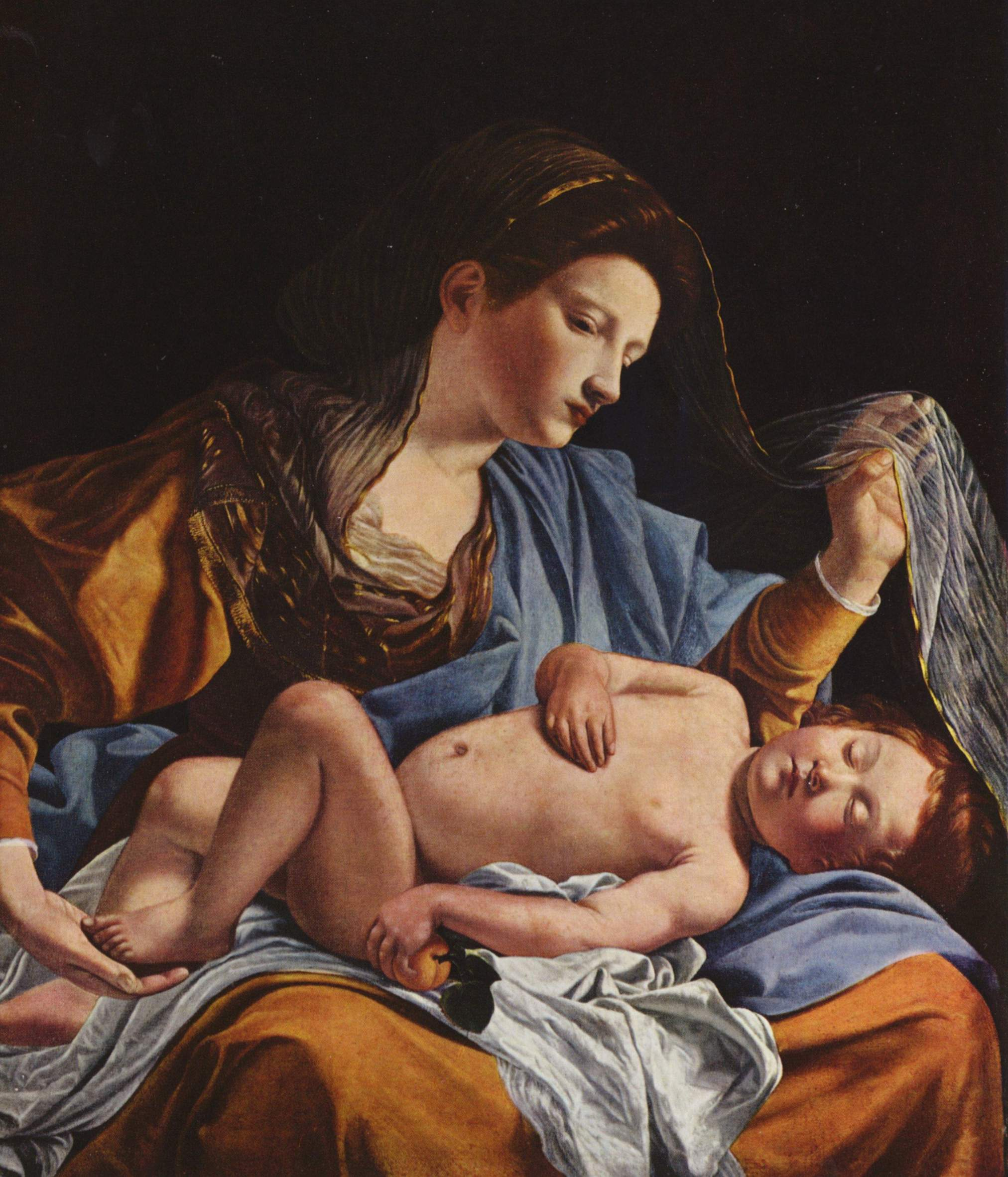
Orazio Gentileschi, Madonna with Child
- Sofonisba Anguissola - Self-portrait
- Caravaggio
  - The Denial of Saint Peter
  - John the Baptist (Galleria Borghese, Rome)
  - The Martyrdom of Saint Ursula
  - David with the Head of Goliath (1609–1610)
- Domenichino - Adoration of the Shepherds (c.1607-1610)
- Artemisia Gentileschi - Susanna and the Elders
- Orazio Gentileschi
  - David After the death of Goliath (approximate date)
  - Madonna with Child
- Peter Paul Rubens - Samson and Delilah (approximate date)

== Births ==
- May 18 – Stefano della Bella, Italian printmaker known for etchings of many subjects, including military ones (died 1664)
- September 4 - Giovanni Andrea Sirani, Bolognese painter of the Baroque period (died 1670)
- December 10 – Adriaen van Ostade, Dutch genre painter (died 1685)
- December 15 – David Teniers the Younger, Flemish painter (died 1690)
- date unknown
  - Hong Ren, Chinese monk and painter of the Xin'an school of painting (died 1664)
  - Francesco Lauri, Italian fresco painter (died 1635)
  - Li Yin, Chinese painter, poet and calligrapher (died 1685)
  - Anton Francesco Lucini, Italian engraver and printmaker (died after 1661)
  - Jan Miense Molenaer, Dutch genre painter (died 1668)
  - Giulio Quaglio, Italian fresco painter (died 1658)
  - Giovanni Francesco Romanelli, Italian fresco painter (died 1662)
- probable
  - Jan Asselijn, Dutch painter of landscapes and animals (died 1652)
  - Domenico de Benedettis, Italian painter (died 1678)
  - Jan Dirksz Both, Dutch painter (died 1652)
  - Francisco Camilo, Spanish painter (died 1671)
  - Albert Eckhout, Dutch portrait and still life painter (died 1665)
  - Anthonie de Lorme, Dutch painter (died 1673)
  - Simon Luttichuys, Dutch painter (died 1661)
  - Jean Nicolle, French painter (died 1650)
  - Michele Pace del Campidoglio, Italian painter of fruit and flowers (died 1670)
  - Adriano Palladino, Italian painter born and active in Cortona (died 1680)
  - Giovanni Battista Passeri, Italian painter of genre and still life paintings (died 1679)
  - Dirck van Santvoort, Dutch painter (died 1680)
  - Karel Škréta, Czech Baroque painter (died 1674)
  - Hendrik Martenszoon Sorgh, Dutch painter (died 1670)
  - Pieter Verbeeck, Dutch painter (died 1679)
  - Jacob Willemszoon de Wet, Dutch painter (died 1675-1691)

== Deaths ==
- January 5 - Hieronymus Francken I, Flemish painter (born 1540)
- March 19 - Hasegawa Tōhaku, Japanese painter and founder of the Hasegawa school of Japanese painting during the Azuchi-Momoyama period (born 1539)
- July 18 – Caravaggio, Italian painter (born 1571)
- October 26 - Francesco Vanni, Italian mannerist painter (born 1563)
- December 11 – Adam Elsheimer, German "cabinet" painter (born 1578)
- date unknown
  - Sadiqi Beg, Persian writer and miniaturist (born 1533)
  - Nicolás Borrás, Spanish painter (born 1530)
  - Francesco Curia, Italian Renaissance painter (born 1538)
  - Benedetto Gennari, Italian painter (born 1563)
- probable
  - Giovanni Battista Cremonini, Italian painter of primarily frescoes (born 1550)
  - Juan Bautista Vázquez the Younger, Spanish sculptor part of the Sevillian school of sculpture (born unknown)
