= 1670 in art =

Events from the year 1670 in art.

== Events ==
- An inventory of the art collection of Principe Lorenzo Onofrio Colonna lists works by Pietro Paolo Bonzi and many others.
- Gerard Reynst publishes Signorum Veterum Icones, a series of prints by Gerard de Lairesse based on the Italian statuary in Reynst's Amsterdam collection.

== Paintings ==
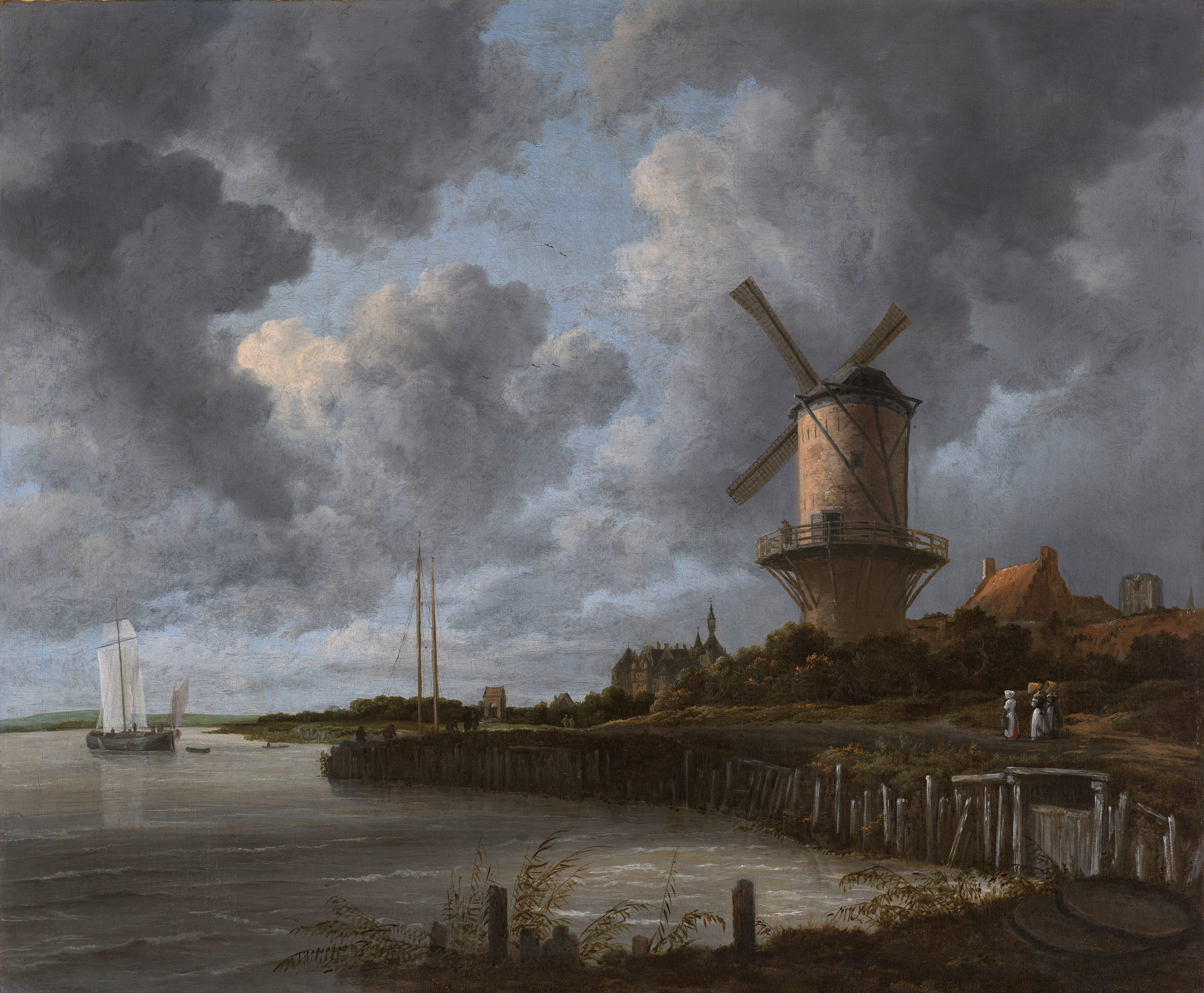
Ruisdael – The windmill at Wijk

- Job Adriaenszoon Berckheyde – The Old Exchange of Amsterdam (approximate date)
- Jan de Bray – David Playing the Harp
- Hendrick Danckerts – View of Greenwich and the Queen's House
- Isaac Fuller – Self-portrait (approximate date)
- Cornelis Norbertus Gysbrechts – Trompe-l'œil: The Reverse of a Framed Painting (approximate date)
- Jacob Ochtervelt – Musical Company in an Interior (approximate date)
- Jacob Isaakszoon van Ruisdael – The windmill at Wijk bij Duurstede (approximate date)
- Jan Vermeer – The Lacemaker

== Births ==
- January 26 – Jacob van Schuppen, Austrian painter (died 1751)
- April 23 – Cassandra Willoughby, Duchess of Chandos, English historian, travel writer and artist (died 1735)
- August 24 – Louis Galloche, French painter (died 1761)
- date unknown
  - Louis Audran, French engraver (died 1712)
  - François Boitard, French painter (died 1715)
  - Grigory Musikiysky, Russian painter (died 1740)
  - Arcangelo Resani, Italian painter of animals and hunted game (died 1740)
  - John Verelst, English portrait painter (died 1734)

== Deaths ==
- January 18 – Andrea Vaccaro, Italian Caravaggisti painter of a tenebrist style (born 1600)
- May 21 – Giovanni Andrea Sirani, Bolognese painter (born 1610)
- June – Hendrik Martenszoon Sorgh, Dutch painter of the baroque era (born 1610)
- June 15 – Louis Lerambert, French sculptor from family of artists (born 1620)
- November 3 (buried) – Salomon van Ruysdael, Dutch Golden Age landscape painter (born 1602)
- November 5 - Viviano Codazzi, Italian architectural painter (born 1604)
- November 26 – Jacob van Loo, Dutch painter, founder of the Van Loo family of painters (born 1614)
- December – Bartholomeus van der Helst, Dutch portrait painter (born 1613)
- December 24 – Jan Mytens, Dutch painter (born 1614)
- date unknown
  - Angelica Veronica Airola, Italian painter (born 1590)
  - Isaac Briot, French engraver and draughtsman (born 1585)
  - Cheng Zhengkui, Chinese landscape painter and poet (born 1604)
  - Giovanna Garzoni, Italian woman painter of still-lifes of fruits, vegetables, and flowers (born 1600)
  - Jean Michelin, French Protestant painter (born about 1616)
  - Juan de Pareja, Spanish painter from Seville (born 1610)
- probable
  - Luca Forte, Italian painter of still-lifes in Naples (born 1615)
  - Michele Pace del Campidoglio, Italian painter of fruit and flowers (born 1610)
