= 1610 in Italy =

An incomplete series of events, births and deaths which happened in Italy in 1610:

- 10 April – Treaty of Brussol

== Births ==
- Ercole Ferrata (dies 1686)
- Stefano della Bella, draughtsman and printmaker (dies 1664)
- Giovanni Francesco
- Anton Francesco Lucini
- Pietro del Po, Baroque painter (dies 1692)
- Francesco Lauri, Baroque painter (dies 1635)
- Domenico de Benedettis, painter (dies 1678)
- Adriano Palladino, painter (dies 1680)
- Eustachio Divini (dies 1685)
- Giulio Quaglio (painter) (dies 1658 or later)

== Deaths ==
- Caravaggio
- Paolo Virchi
- Francesco Vanni
- Francesco Curia
- Ascanio Vitozzi
- Giovanni Battista Cremonini
