= The Baker's Cart =

Painting

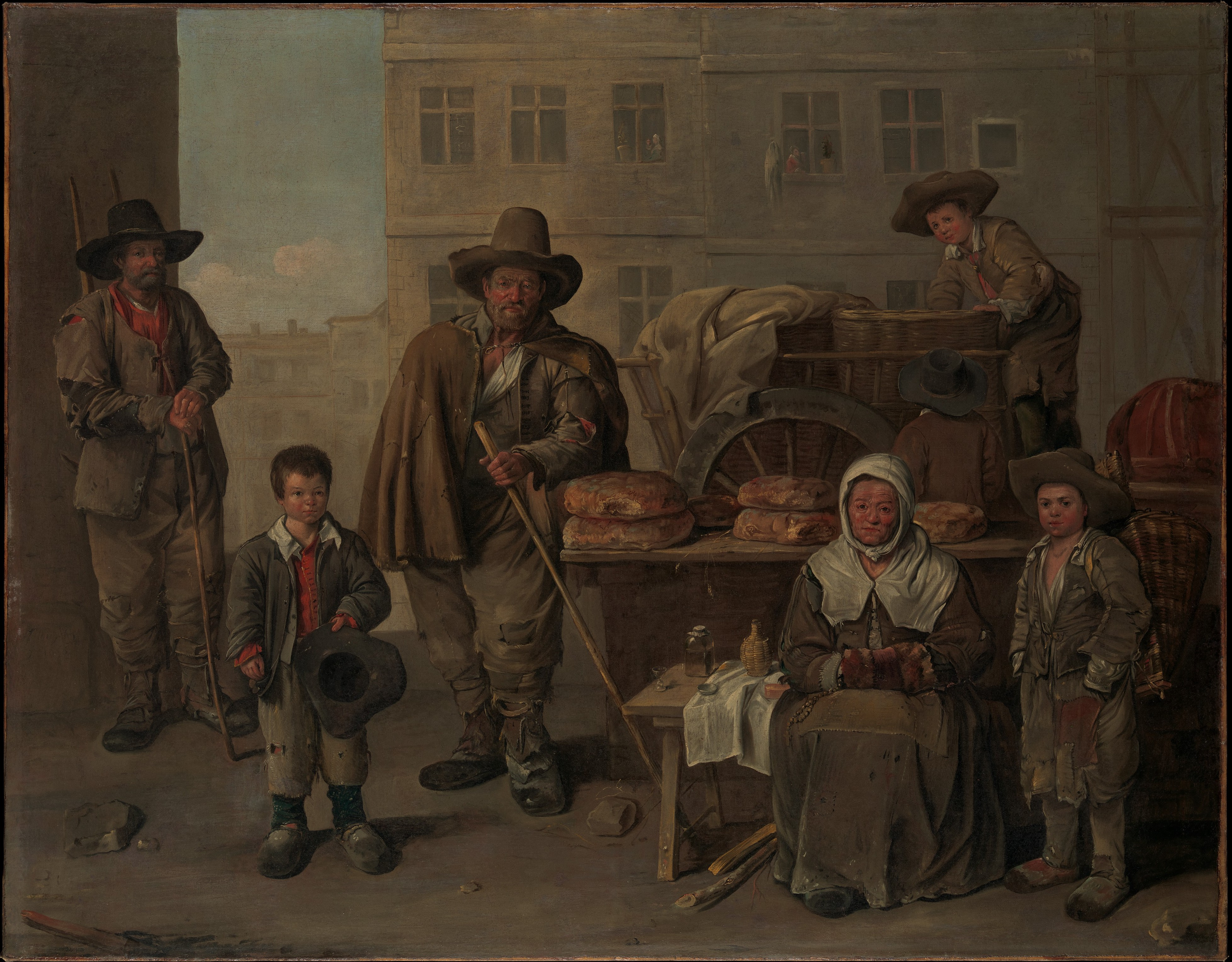
- Artist: Jean Michelin
- Year: 1656
- Medium: oil on canvas
- Dimensions: 98.4 cm × 125.4 cm (38.7 in × 49.4 in)
- Location: Metropolitan Museum of Art

The Baker's Cart is a mid 17th century painting by Jean Michelin. Done in oil on canvas, the painting depicts a family of French peasants. The painting is currently in the collection of the Metropolitan Museum of Art.

== Description ==
The Baker's Cart was painted in 1656 by relatively obscure French painter Jean Michelin. Michelin's claim to significance were his depictions of peasants in urban settings, as opposed to more common pastoral ones; this is reflected in The Baker's Cart, which is set in the city. The painting depicts a family of peasants peddling wares from their cart. Large slabs of bread can be seen for sale, as can a vial of eau-de-vie, a medicinal brandy-based solution. The family themselves are visibly poor, as indicated by their clothing, complexions and profession.

It was not known that Michelin painted the work until his signature was uncovered on the painting's frame in 1920s.
