= 1563 in art =

Events from the year 1563 in art.

== Events ==
- January 13 – The Accademia e Compagnia delle Arti del Disegno ("Academy and company of the arts of drawing") is established in Florence by Cosimo I de' Medici, Grand Duke of Tuscany, under the influence of Giorgio Vasari.
- December 4 – The Council of Trent issues a decree on the proper function of Roman Catholic art.
- date unknown - The Medici court astronomer Fra Ignazio Danti paints 57 maps at the Palazzo Vecchio in Florence.

== Paintings ==
Brueghel, The Tower of Babel, oil on board, Kunsthistorisches Museum, Vienna

- Giuseppe Arcimboldo paints his first The Four Seasons series.
- Pieter Brueghel the Elder paints Adoration of the Magi in a Winter Landscape, Landscape with the Flight into Egypt and The Tower of Babel.
- Niccolò Circignani paints the Concert in the Government Room of the Città della Pieve in Umbria.
- Lucas de Heere paints a portrait of Mary, Queen of Scots.
- Giovanni Battista Moroni paints The Count Pietro Secco Suardo.
- Francesco Primaticcio paints Odysseus and Penelope.
- Bernaert de Rijckere paints a portrait diptych of Antwerp merchant Adriaan van Santvoort and his family.
- Paolo Veronese completes painting The Wedding at Cana (1562-1563).

== Births ==
- June 4 - George Heriot, Scottish goldsmith, jeweler and philanthropist (died 1624)
- date unknown
  - Grazio Cossali, Italian painter (died 1629)
  - Ercole dell'Abate, Italian painter (died 1618)
  - Benedetto Gennari, Italian painter of the early-Baroque period (died 1610)
  - Orazio Gentileschi, Italian Baroque Caravaggisti painter (died 1639)
  - Anton Möller, Polish painter (died 1611)
  - Heo Nanseolheon, Korean poet and painter (died 1589)
  - Francesco Vanni, Italian mannerist painter (died 1610)

== Deaths ==
- October 22 - Diego Siloe, Spanish Renaissance architect and sculptor (born c. 1495)
- date unknown - Andrea Schiavone, Venetian Renaissance etcher and painter (born 1510/1515)
