= Segusium =

Segusium may refer to:

- Segusium (association) (Society for Research and Studies of Susa Valley), an Italian non-profit organization
- Susa, Piedmont (Latin: Segusium), a town and comune in Italy
