= Treaty of Brussol =

1610 treaty between Savoy and France

The Treaty of Brussol (also known as the Treaty of Bruzolo) was signed on 10 April 1610 in Bruzolo between Charles Emmanuel I, Duke of Savoy, and Henry IV of France, inside the Castle of Bruzolo, (in Susa Valley, near Turin). Based on the terms of the accord, both signatories agreed to combine their forces in order to remove the Spanish from Italy. The agreement also dictated that the Duke of Mantua exchange the province of Casale Monferrato for the province of Cremona. Also, the territories of Montferrat and Milan would be united under the control of Savoy. Under the treaty, Victor Emmanuel would be restored to the throne of Lombardy. Also, Henry IV would have his daughter marry Prince Victor Amadeus I and that the King of France, the Republic of Venice, and the Pope guarantee the Duke of Savoy the title of King of Lombardy. However, this accord was never realized since Henry IV was assassinated by Ravaillac in May 1610. Marie de' Medici, just crowned queen, overturned the treaty. Even though Henry's death ended the treaty, Charles Emmanuel seized Montferrat from the Spanish in 1613, which led to a war that lasted until 1617.

== Sources ==
- Bidwell, Walter Hilliard and Agnew, John Holmes. Eclectic Magazine. Leavitt, Throw and Co., 1862, p9.
- P. Merlin, M. Minola, M. Cavargna, L. Crepaldi, G. Sclaverano, A 400 anni dai Trattati di Bruzolo. Gli equilibri europei prima e dopo i Trattati, Segusium, November 2010, pp 80
