= Adoration of the Shepherds (Le Nain) =

Painting by the Le Nain Brothers

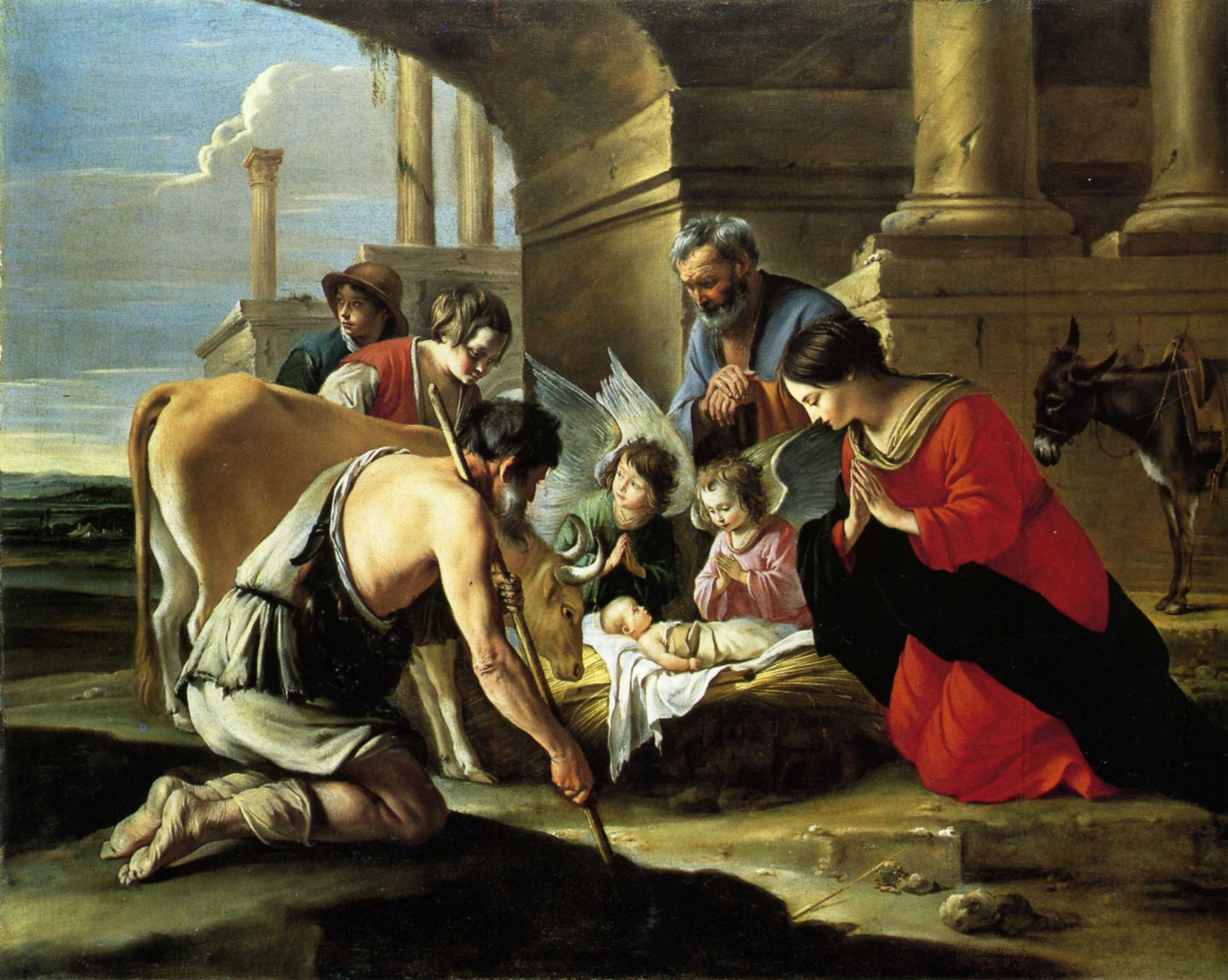
Adoration of the Shepherds by the Le Nain Brothers

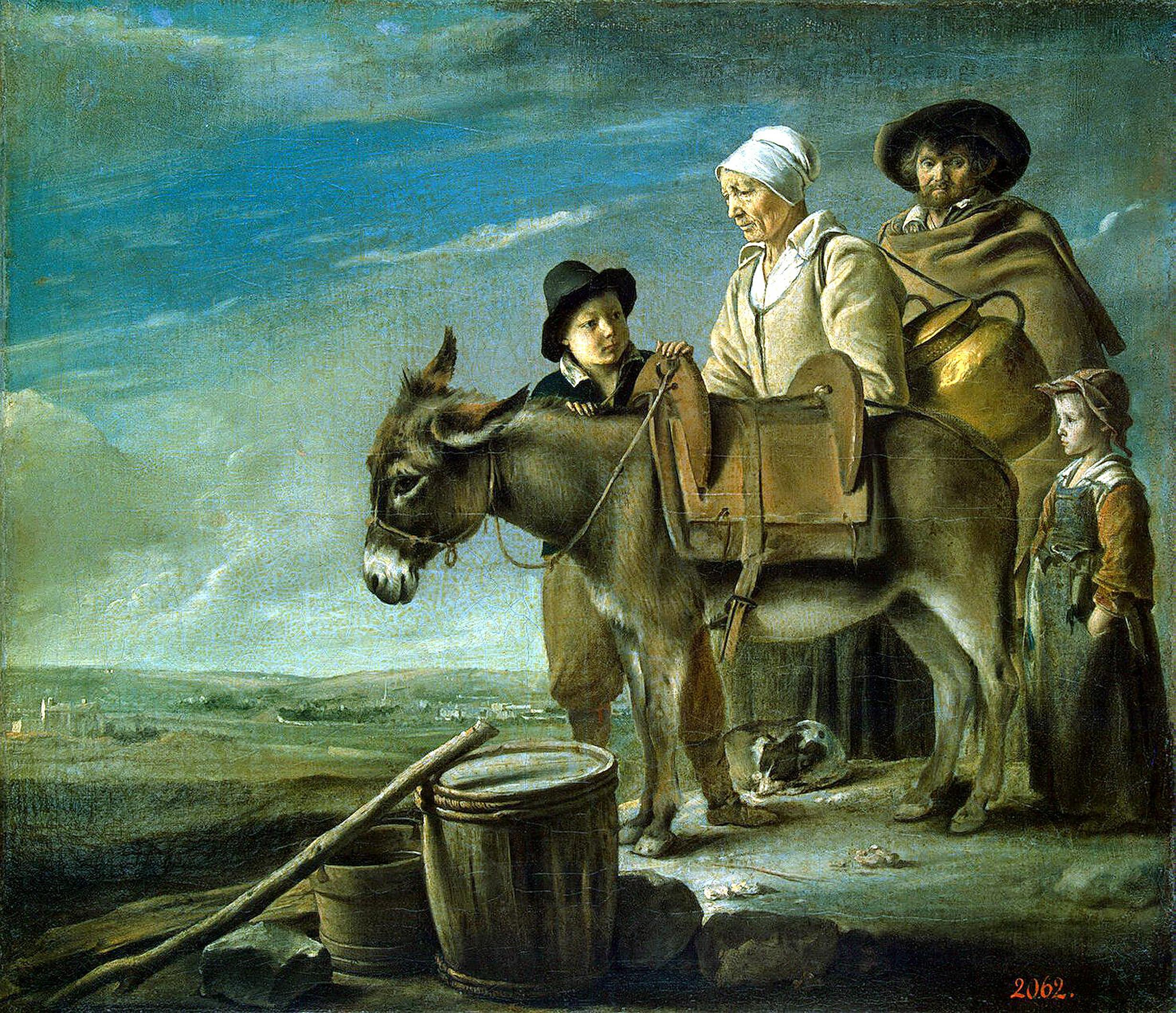
The Milkmaid's Family, a more typical Le Nain painting thought to date to 1641, with similar donkey.

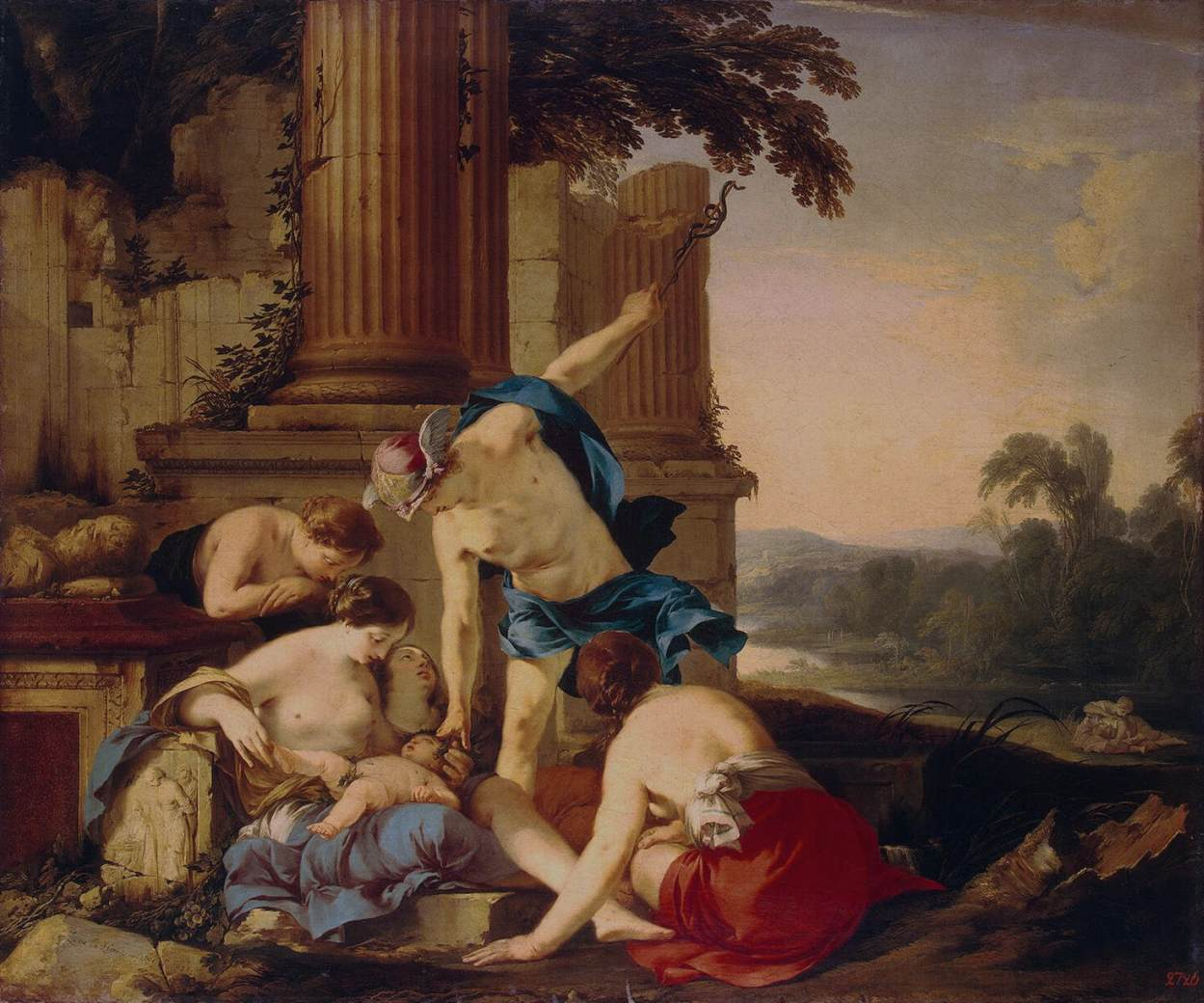
Mercury confiding Bacchus to the Nymphs, Laurent de La Hyre, dated 1638, with a similar setting

The Adoration of the Shepherds by the Le Nain Brothers is in the National Gallery in London. The painting dates from about 1640, and is relatively unusual as a religious subject or history painting in their oeuvre; they are best known for genre painting, especially groups of peasants. As with most of the works of Antoine (c 1600–1648), Louis (c. 1603?–1648) and Mathieu (1607–1677) Le Nain, it is not possible to establish which brother, or combination of brothers, painted it. This painting is unsigned, but when they signed their works, from 1641 to 1648, it was simply as Lenain.

== Description ==
The painting is in oil on canvas and in good condition, with minor losses; it measures 109.2 cm × 138.7 cm (43.0 in × 54.6 in). The Adoration of the Shepherds is a very common subject in the Nativity of Jesus in art, and the composition is an arrangement of the conventional components, including the Holy Family, the ox and ass or donkey, angels, and three shepherds, two old and one young. One shepherd and an angel are glancing out to the viewer's left, and it has been suggested that they have seen the approach of the Biblical Magi, which may have been the subject of a matching painting. There are pentimenti showing what appears to have been the original composition: on the wall above the lefthand angel dim traces of a head of the Virgin can be seen, slightly bowed to the left matching Joseph just to her right. On the donkey the trace of a curved rein can be seen, starting where the white chest meets the foreleg; the whole animal may originally have been lower. Michael Levey describes the treatment of the scene as "partly 'realistic' and humbly rustic and partly idealized", and the National Gallery detect the influence of Orazio Gentileschi, who had worked in Paris, in the figures of Mary and Joseph, and the ass.

Dates in the 1630s have been suggested, and also that the painting is by Mathieu, or Louis. Elements of the architectural setting have been compared to those in a painting by Laurent de La Hyre in the Hermitage Museum dated 1638, Mercury confiding Bacchus to the Nymphs (in reverse), and the ass is very similar to that in The Milkmaid's Family, also in the Hermitage, a Le Nain painting thought to date to 1641. There is an Adoration attributed to the brothers, and at least in a similar style, in the National Gallery of Ireland, which shares some aspects of the composition. Another, more realist, Adoration of the Shepherds in the Louvre was long attributed to the Le Nains, but is now given to Jean Michelin and dated 1659.

== Provenance ==
As with most Le Nain paintings, the original commissioner is not known, nor whether it was intended for a church or other religious institution, or a domestic setting. It first appears in England in the 1770s. Possibly it was the painting of the subject sold at Christie's 7 February 1771, as by Le Nain (lot 21), realizing the good price of £42, and/or that sold on 20 March 1773, again at Christie's, this time for only £14 4s 6d (lot 85, as "Le Naine"). It was certainly at Blenheim Palace by 1777, now attributed to Luca Giordano, in the collection of George Spencer, 4th Duke of Marlborough. It remained in the Marlborough collection until the epic sales in the 1880s of the 8th Duke, when it was once again sold at Christie's on 7 August 1886 (lot 652, £52 10s), bought by a dealer. It was later bought by Henry Fitzalan-Howard, 15th Duke of Norfolk and is recorded as hanging in the "Prince's Bedroom" at Arundel Castle in 1902, still as a Giordano. In 1962 it was sold by the 16th Duke to the National Gallery, as a Le Nain. It is catalogued as NG 6331, and hangs in Room 18.

== See also ==
- Adoration of the Shepherds (Poussin), another French painting, 1633-34 by Nicolas Poussin, also in the National Gallery
