= Adoration of the Shepherds (Poussin) =

Painting by Nicolas Poussin

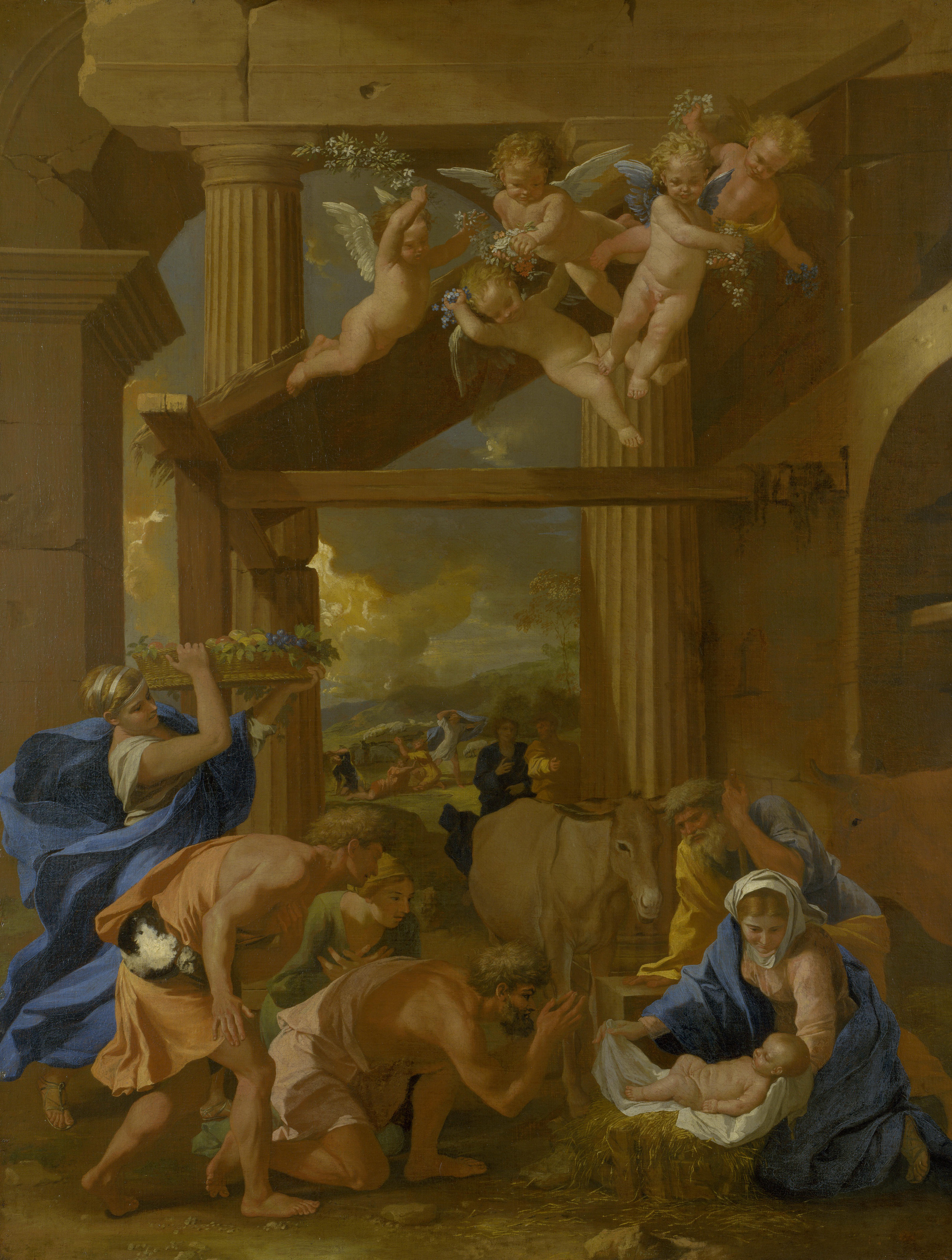
The Adoration of the Shepherds, 1633–34, by Nicolas Poussin

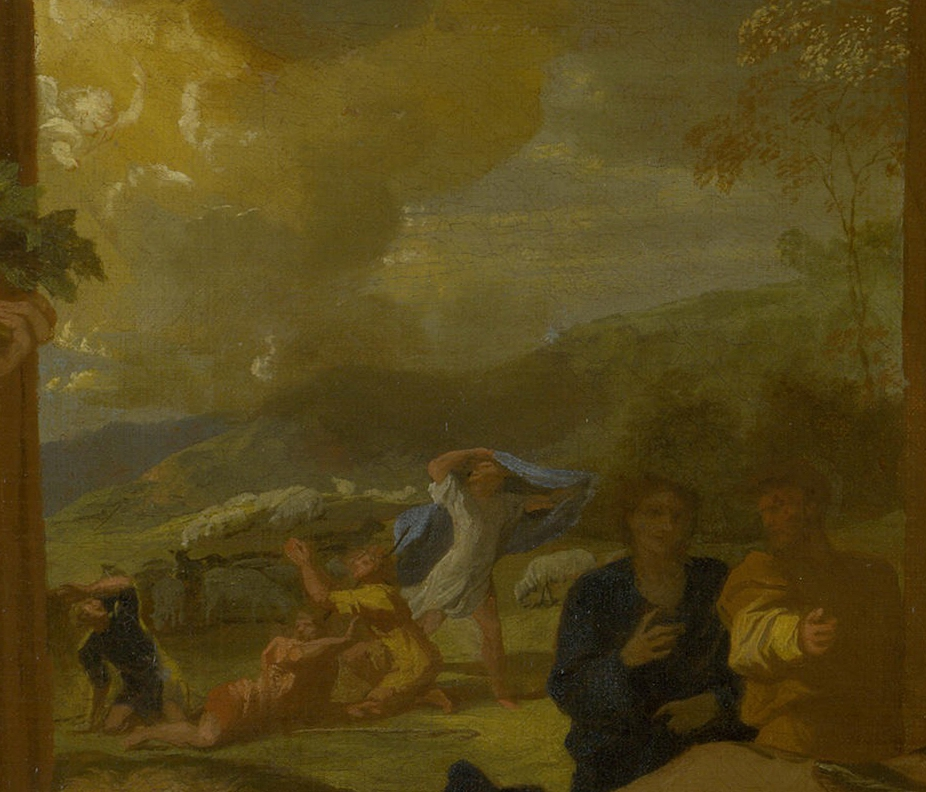
Detail with the Annunciation to the Shepherds in the distance

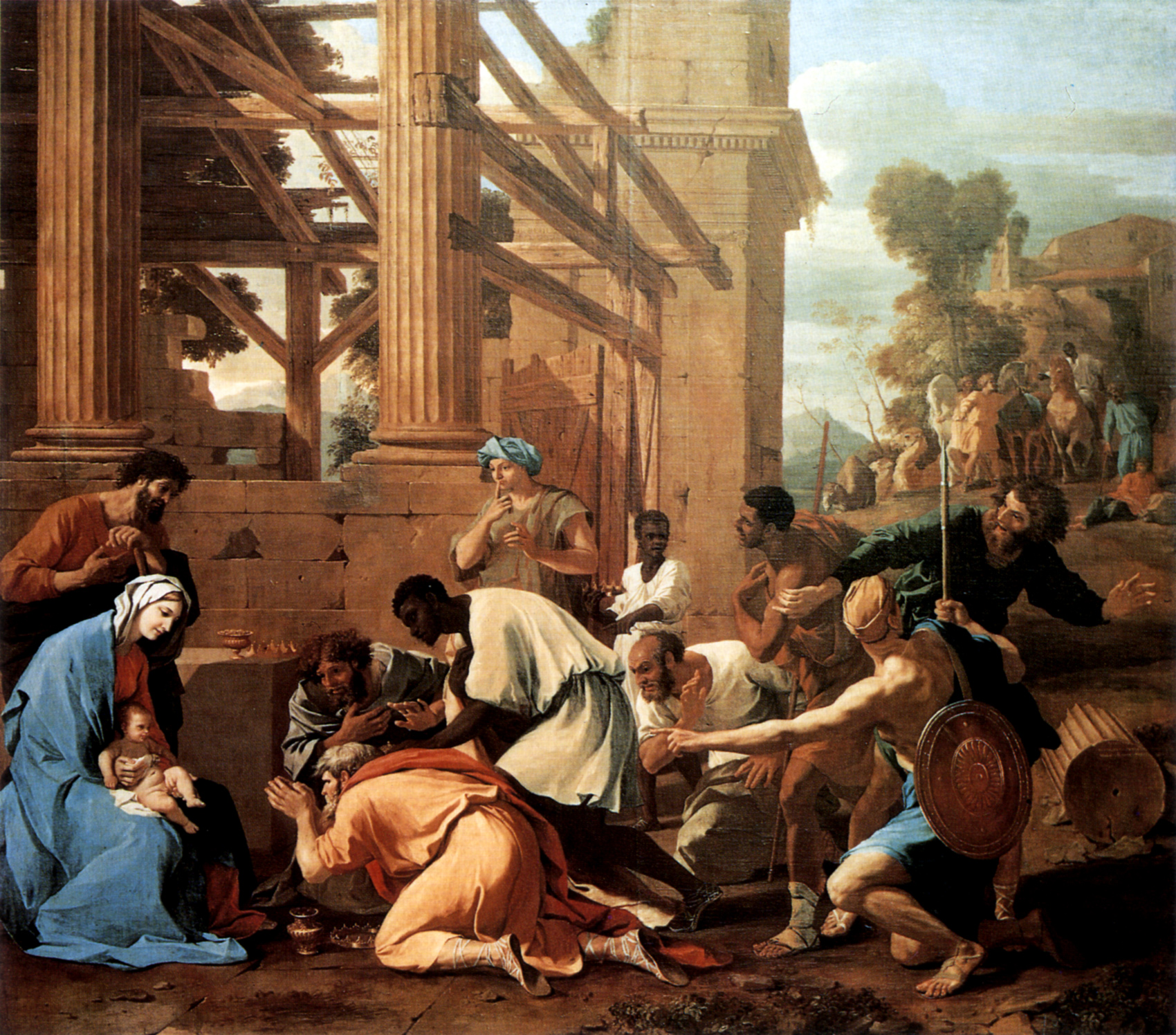
Poussin's The Adoration of the Magi, dated 1633, Dresden

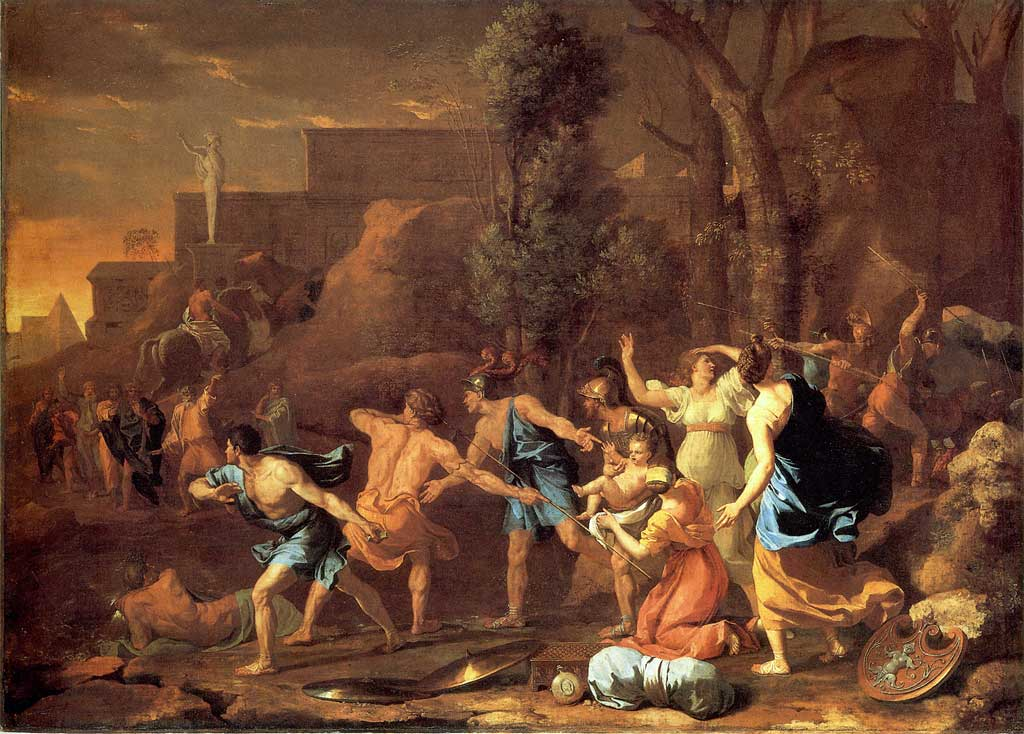
Poussin's The Saving of the Infant Pyrrhus, by 1634 Louvre, another "coppery" colour scheme.

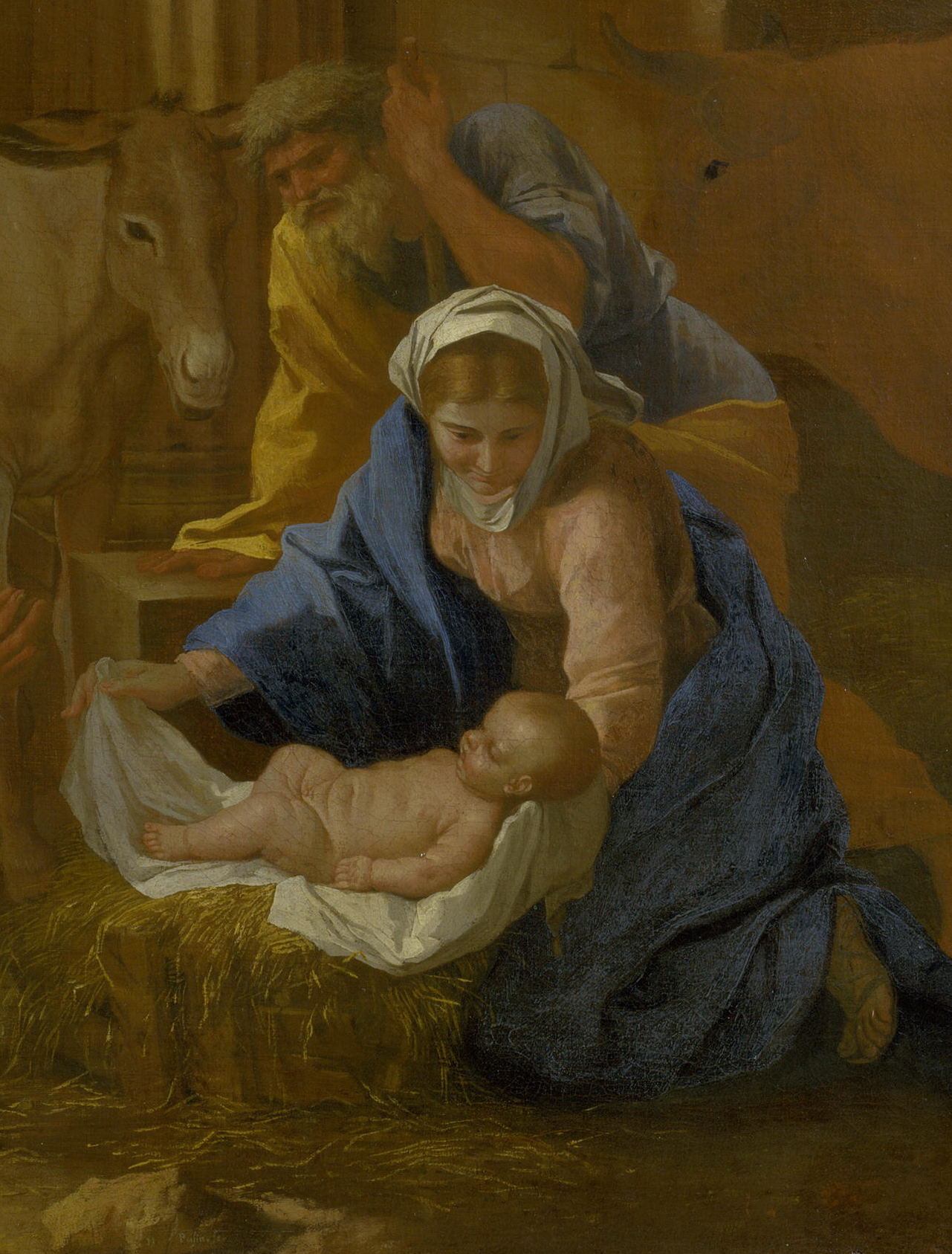
Detail with Mary, Jesus, Joseph, the ox and ass

The Adoration of the Shepherds is a painting of 1633–34 by the French painter Nicolas Poussin (1594–1665), now in the National Gallery, London (Room 19). It is in oils on canvas, and measures 97.2 by 74 centimetres (38.3 in × 29.1 in) (with uneven edges). Unusually for Poussin, it is signed "N. Pusin.fe" ["fecit"] on the stone at lower right. By 1637, soon after it was painted, it was owned by Cardinal Gian Carlo de' Medici (1611–1663), the second son of Grand Duke Cosimo II of Tuscany and was placed in his villa outside Florence.

It belongs to a group of paintings with a predominately "coppery" colour scheme, from which its dating mainly derives. Classicising elements have been added to the usual figures.

The painting was evidently well-regarded, and 20 painted copies are recorded from approximately the next century, as well as seven print versions made between the 1660s and 1813. There are a number of drawings, some showing what appear to be early thoughts about the composition, though some may not be by Poussin or were created before the painting. As is often the case with Poussin, elements of the painting reflect the works of other artists, including Raphael.

== Description ==
To the usual cast of the Nativity of Jesus in art are added the earlier scene of the Annunciation to the Shepherds in the distance at the centre, five putti above, about to shower the scene with flowers, and a woman at left holding a large wicker tray with fruit. The scene takes place in a large but derelict classical building, to which a crude wooden lean-to stable has been added. The golden stone of the building is echoed by the tanned bodies of the shepherds, the cloudy sky, and other elements, giving an unusually unified "coppery" colour scheme to the painting, with the blue of the Virgin Mary's mantle and that of the woman carrying the fruit the other prominent colour. The ox, to the right of Joseph, almost disappears into the wall behind him.

Unlike those in the still central scene, the figures in the small background Annunciation to the Shepherds are highly agitated, with extreme and strenuous poses. The gesturing angel is loosely painted in white against the cloud, just above the foremost vine leaves in the basket. Like other figures by Poussin from this period, the foreground figures seem to have a frozen sculptural quality. The figure with a green dress is female. The foremost kneeling shepherd is close to, and perhaps derived from, a shepherd in a painting of the Nativity by Raphael (Vatican Loggie).

== Date ==
Other paintings by Poussin, generally dated to the years between 1633 and 1634, have similar colour schemes. The Adoration of the Magi in the Gemäldegalerie Alte Meister in Dresden (illustrated) is dated 1633; it has a very similar setting but a more varied colour scheme, so the London Adoration of the Shepherds is assumed to be later than that. The Saving of the Infant Pyrrhus in the Louvre, with a similar unified "coppery" scheme, has now been shown to have been finished by 1634 at the latest, so the London painting is now assigned to 1633–34 with reference to these, and also a drawing with a preparatory sketch on the verso, now in the Royal Collection. This was made for Marshall Charles III de Créquy when he was French ambassador to Rome, resident there between June 1633 and July 1634.

Another "coppery-toned" National Gallery Possin (in 2015 hanging next to this one) is The Adoration of the Golden Calf, also dated 1633–34, largely on the basis of this similarity. This is usually thought to have been painted as a pair with The Crossing of the Red Sea, now National Gallery of Victoria, Melbourne; the two remained together until 1945.

== Background ==
The painting was done when Poussin was approaching the age of 40. He had been in Rome since 1624, and enjoyed some success in the 1620s, in particular when his main patrons were not abroad on embassies. These were Cardinal Francesco Barberini (1597–1679), nephew of the current Pope, Urban VIII (reigned 1623–1644), and his secretary, the antiquarian Cassiano dal Pozzo (1588–1657), who was to remain an important friend and patron of Poussin. However, when in 1628 Barberini secured him the commission for an altarpiece in St Peter's, the Martyrdom of St Erasmus (Pinacoteca Vaticana), its reception seems to have been lukewarm, which perhaps triggered a change in Poussin's career, along with a period of illness in 1629 or 1630.

At this time he seems to have abandoned the pursuit of the many rich commissions Rome offered for large paintings for churches and palaces, and henceforth painted only canvases of a relatively small size for "a small circle of cognoscenti", led by dal Pozzo. That this painting quickly passed to a Medici prince-cardinal makes it rather untypical for this period, though during the 1630s awareness of Poussin's talent was growing in the French court, until he was eventually ordered by the king to return to Paris in 1640 (he escaped back to Rome two years later, and never left again).

His style and subject-matter also changed at the end of the 1620s, switching away from the influence of Italian baroque painters to a classicism influenced by classical sculpture and the High Renaissance. His paintings from about 1629 to 1633 are nearly all drawn from classical mythology, or the epics of Tasso. The Dresden Adoration, dated 1633, perhaps marks the end of this phase, and for the rest of the 1630s his subjects become once again more varied.

== Iconography ==
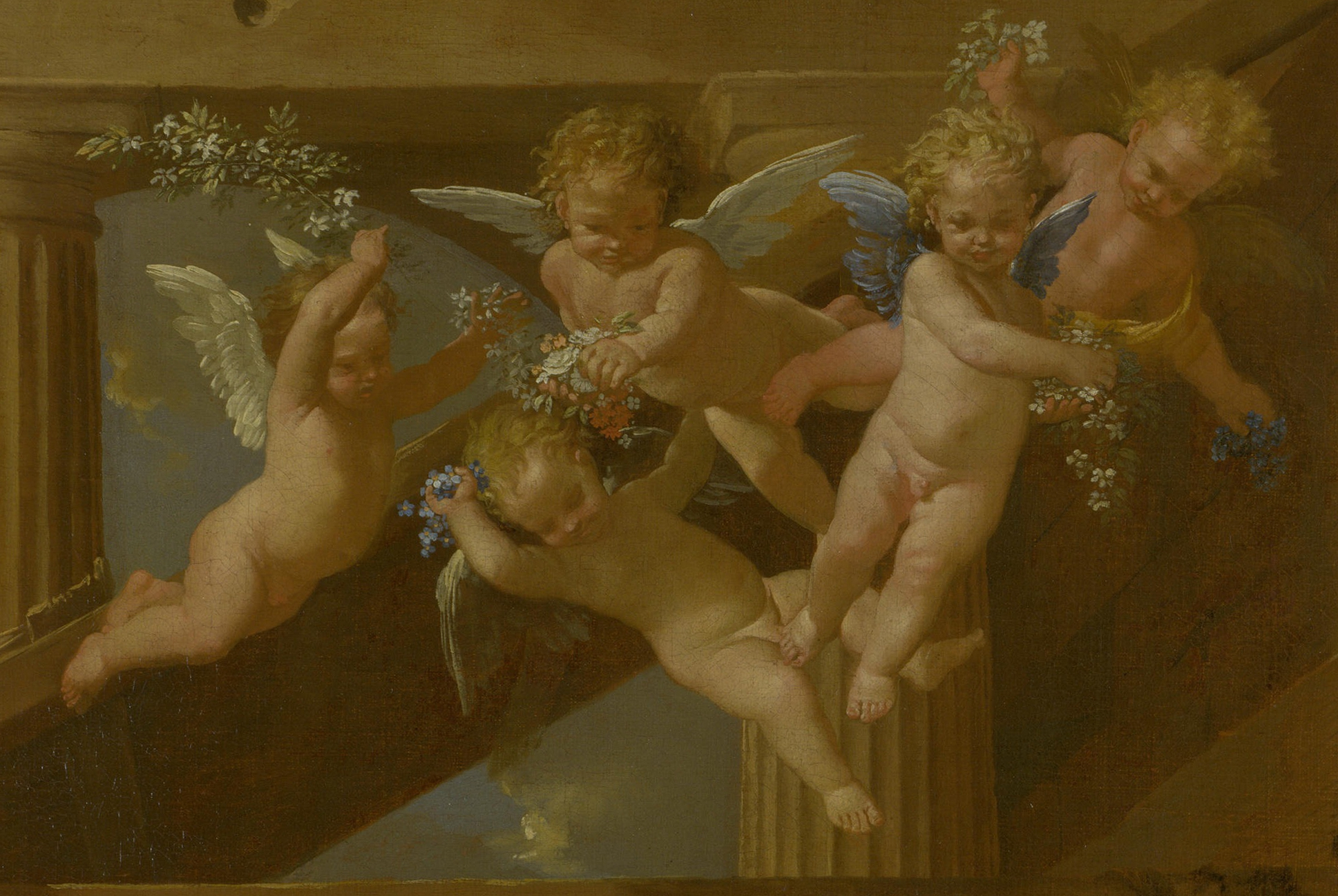
Detail of the putti

Nativity scenes are very often given such classical settings. As well as showing off the artist's skill and learning they acted as a reminder of the medieval legend, reported in the popular compilation of the Golden Legend, that on the night of Christ's birth the Basilica of Maxentius in Rome, supposed to house a statue of Romulus, had partly tumbled to the ground, leaving the impressive ruins that survive today.

Another meaning for the ruined temple went back to 15th-century Early Netherlandish painting, when the usual simple shed of the Nativity stable, little changed from Late Antiquity, had developed into an elaborate ruined temple, initially Romanesque in style, which represented the dilapidated state of the Old Covenant of the Jewish law. In Italian works the architecture of such temples became classical, reflecting the growing interest in the ancient world, and the ruins that remained in many areas.

The woman with the fruit can be paralleled in some other paintings, and if the work was actually commissioned by Cardinal de' Medici, a reference to a statue of Plenty by Donatello, now lost but then prominently displayed in the Mercato Vecchio of his home-city of Florence, may have been intended. It was also a Florentine custom to bring gifts of fruit to women after childbirth, no doubt to be placed on their desco da parto. Various meanings might be attached to both the apples and grapes the woman appears to carry, and the types of flowers held by the putti, though other than the jasmine held by the top left putto, the identification of these is not entirely clear.

The main surviving preparatory drawing is in the British Museum. This is in a horizontal format, just showing the lower part, and may suggest that Poussin originally intended a smaller painting with a horizontal format, although the drawing is cut along its top edge. This includes an upturned pediment stone at bottom left, a low arch in the centre at what is now about halfway up the final composition, and a lamb lying below Jesus. Christ Church Picture Gallery in Oxford has a drawing with the putti, again with differences in the architectural background.

== Provenance ==
The painting was still in the collection of Cardinal Gian Carlo de' Medici in a posthumous inventory in 1663, after which it may have moved to France, where a Nativity attributed to Poussin is recorded in a number of collections for the next century. These include that of Louis II Phélypeaux (1643–1727), better known as the chancellor de Pontchartrain, an important French politician. Gian Lorenzo Bernini noted seeing such a painting in his collection in 1665, and one is recorded in his wife's collection in 1672. Another mention, from 1700, is in the collection of André Le Nôtre (1613–1700), the landscape architect and principal gardener of King Louis XIV, and there are two further owners of what was probably the same painting, ending in a posthumous sale in 1761.

At this point it may have passed to England; in 1795 what was certainly the same painting was in the posthumous sale of Sir Joshua Reynolds' collection at Christie's, where it fetched 205 guineas. It was bought by the painter and dealer Henry Walton who sold it a year later to Sir Thomas Beauchamp-Proctor, 2nd Baronet (1756–1827). It remained in the collections of the Proctor-Beauchamp baronets and their family between 1796 and 1956, when it fetched £29,000 at Sotheby's, bought by an overseas collector. An export licence was deferred, allowing the National Gallery to buy the work for £33,100 in 1957, with funds from the Temple-West Fund, the NACF, and a special Treasury grant. It is catalogued as NG6277.

== Condition ==
The condition is "generally good ... but with some wear". There are some minor pentimenti and retouches. As of 2001, the painting was last "cleaned and restored" in 1958, then "surface cleaned and revarnished" in 1975.

== Exhibitions ==
Apart from National Gallery exhibitions since 1957, it has travelled to the Royal Academy in 1880 and 1995, Birmingham Museum and Art Gallery 1992–93 and Paris in 1994–95 (Grand Palais).

== See also ==
- List of paintings by Nicolas Poussin
- Adoration of the Shepherds, French painting, c. 1640 by the Le Nain brothers, also in the National Gallery
