= Odoardo Fialetti =

Italian painter

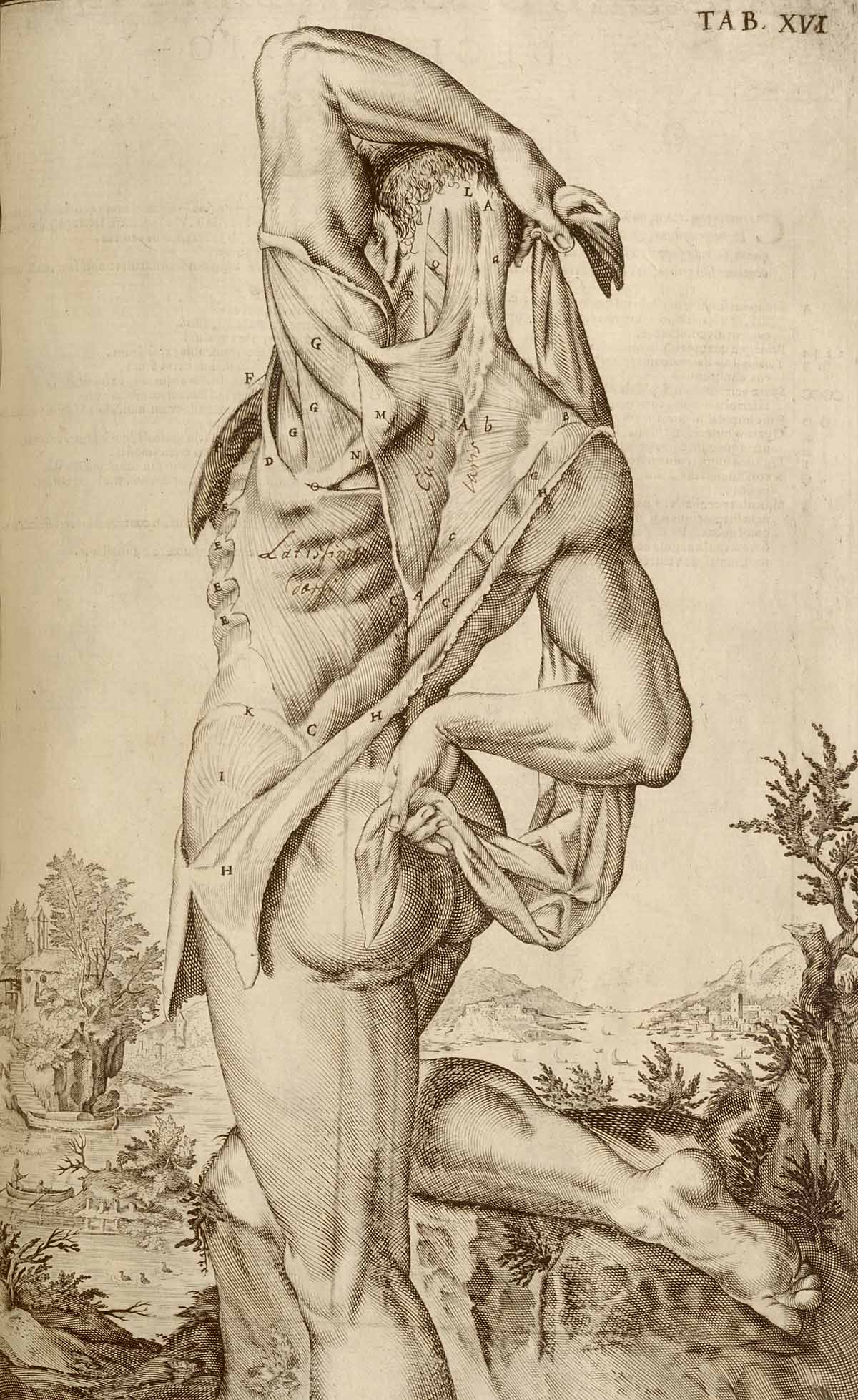
Odoardo Fialetti, Copperplate engraving in Tabulae Anatomicae by the Italian anatomist Giulio Casserio. Venice, 1627. National Library of Medicine

Odoardo Fialetti (18 July 1573 – 1638?) was an Italian painter and printmaker who began his training during the late Renaissance, and showed distinct mannerist sensibilities in his mid-career, adopting a much looser and more dynamic style in his later life.

Born in Bologna, he initially apprenticed with Giovanni Battista Cremonini, and after traveling to Rome, he moved to Venice to work in the elderly Tintoretto's studio. From 1604 to 1612, he is listed as member of the Venetian Fraglia dei Pittori. In Venice, he painted a St Agnes for the church of San Nicolò da Tolentino and scenes from the Life of St Dominic for the sacristy of the Santi Giovanni e Paolo. He died in Venice.

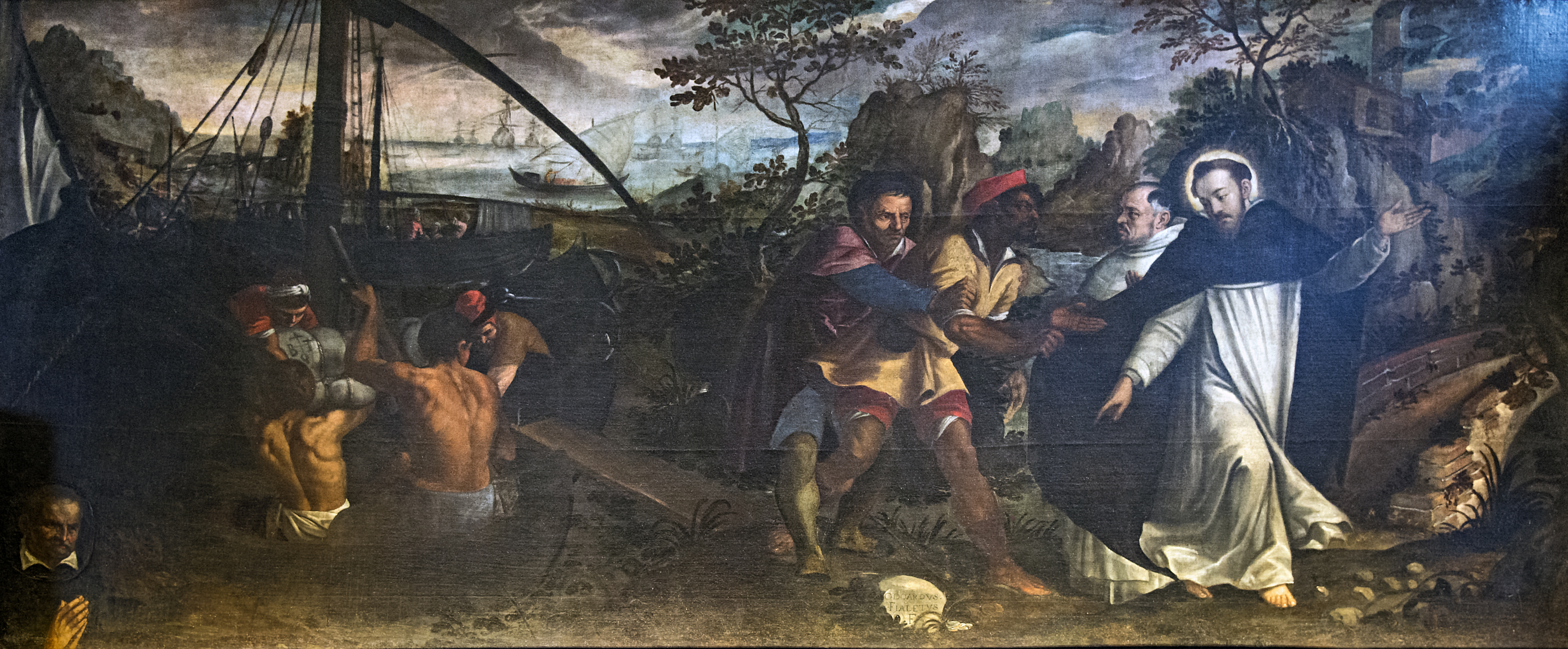
The ferryman payment (Pagamento del traghettatore) San Zanipolo Venice
