= Grigory Musikiysky =

Russian artist (1670–1740)

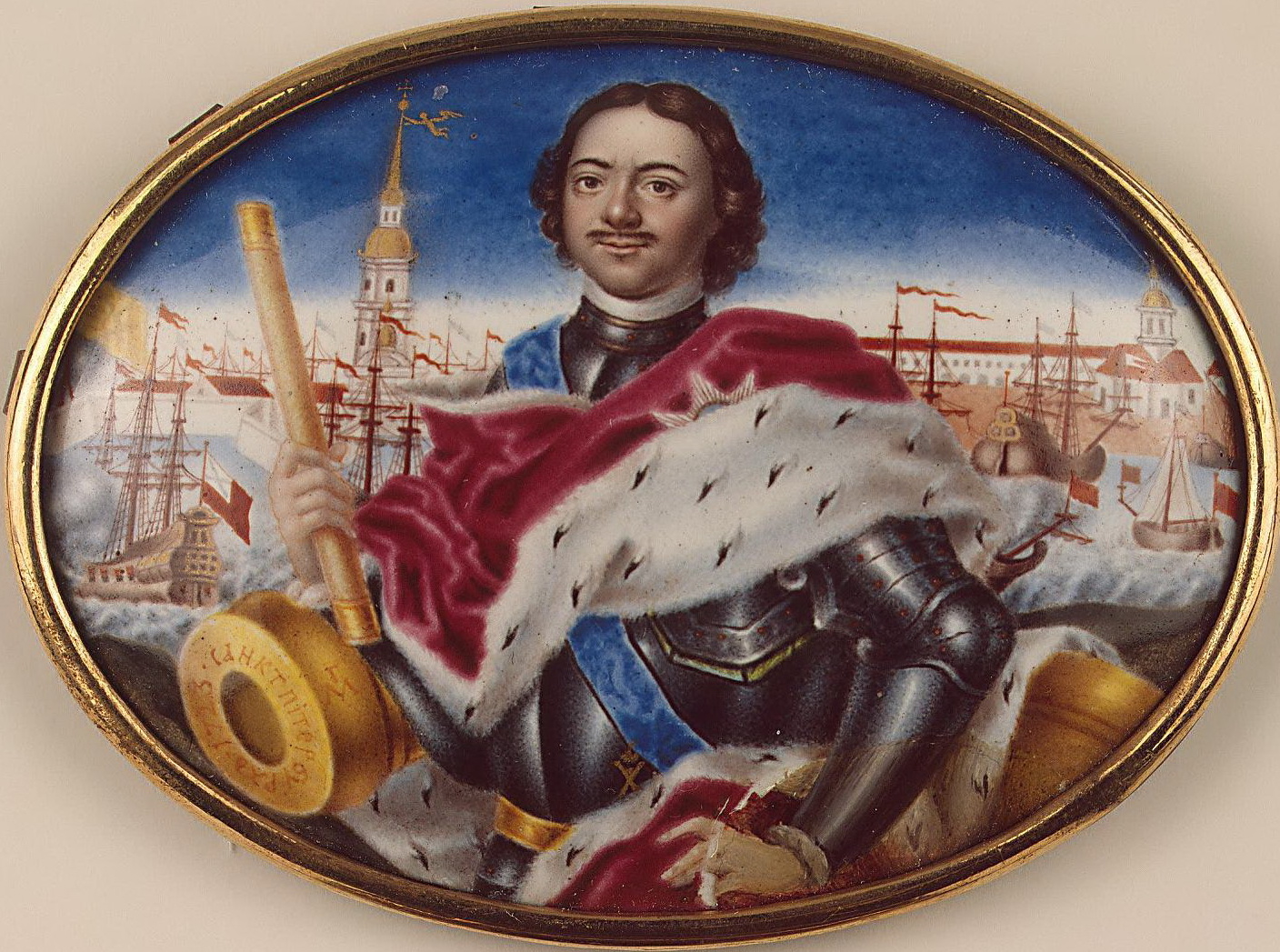
Grigoriis Musikiysky, Portrait of Emperor Peter the Great, Hermitage Museum, 1723

Grigoriis Musikiysky (1670 – 1740; also known as Grigoriis Semyonovich Musikiysky or Grigory Musikiysky, Russian: Георгий Семенович Мусикийский) was a Russian painter and engraver.

Musikiysky painted primarily portraits of Russian nobility, many of which were created as portrait miniatures. His frequent medium was painting enamel on gold or copper. He died in 1740.
