= Anton Möller =

German painter

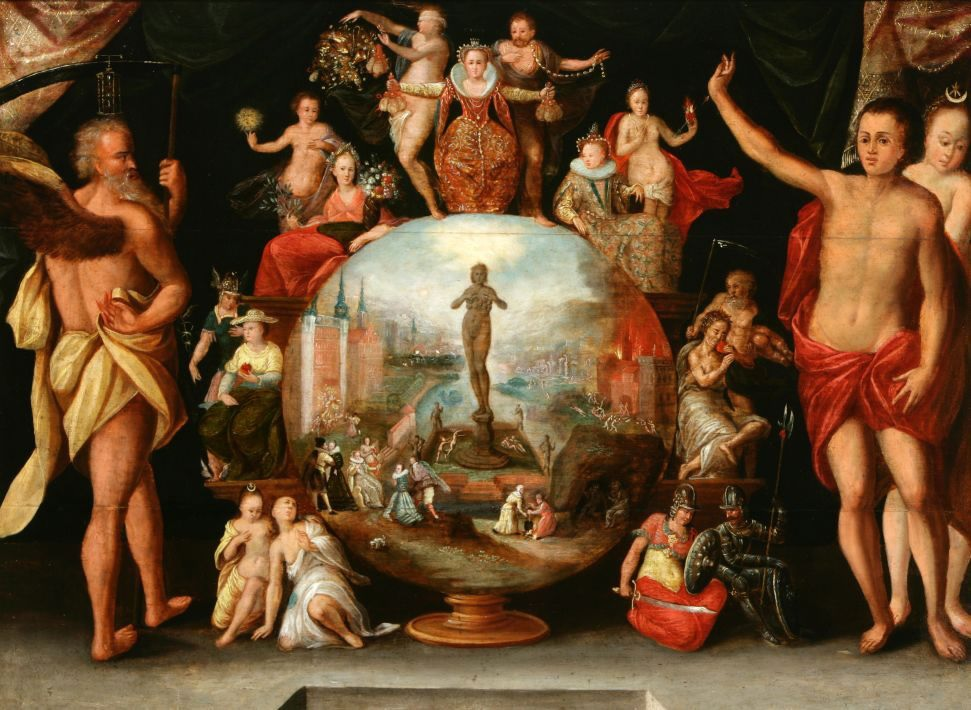
Anton Möller, Model of the World and Gdańsk Society, National Museum, Poznań, 1600

Anton Möller (1563 – January 1611) was a painter and draughtsman from the Holy Roman Empire.

== Biography ==
Möller was born in Königsberg. On 22 April 1578, at the age of 15, he began a seven-year apprenticeship. During this time he frequently copied works by Albrecht Dürer. Reviewing stylistic changes in his works, it is presumed that in the years 1585 - 1587 he travelled to Prussia, Germany and probably to the Netherlands. Previously suggested artistic journey to Italy (especially Venice) has no grounds.

He primarily painted allegorical, historical and biblical scenes and portraits. He also produced a number of woodcuts. He created ceiling, wall and panel paintings for town halls and churches, portraits for private clients, as well as engravings, woodcuts, and pen-and-ink drawings.

Close in time to the completion of the wing-altar of the Katharinenkirche (St Catherine's Church, Gdańsk), Möller died in Danzig (Gdańsk) in 1611. His tomb is located in Oliwa Cathedral in Gdańsk.
