= Giovanni Battista Cremonini =

Italian painter

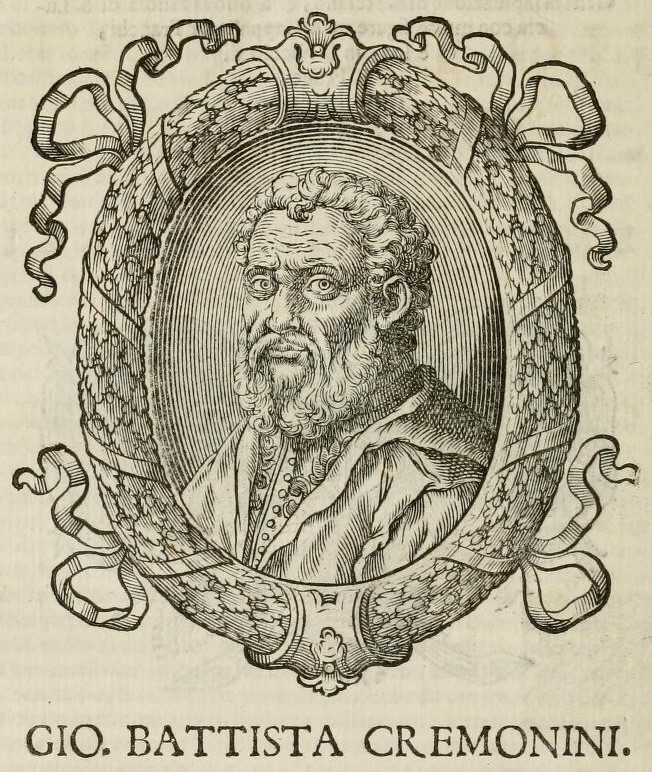

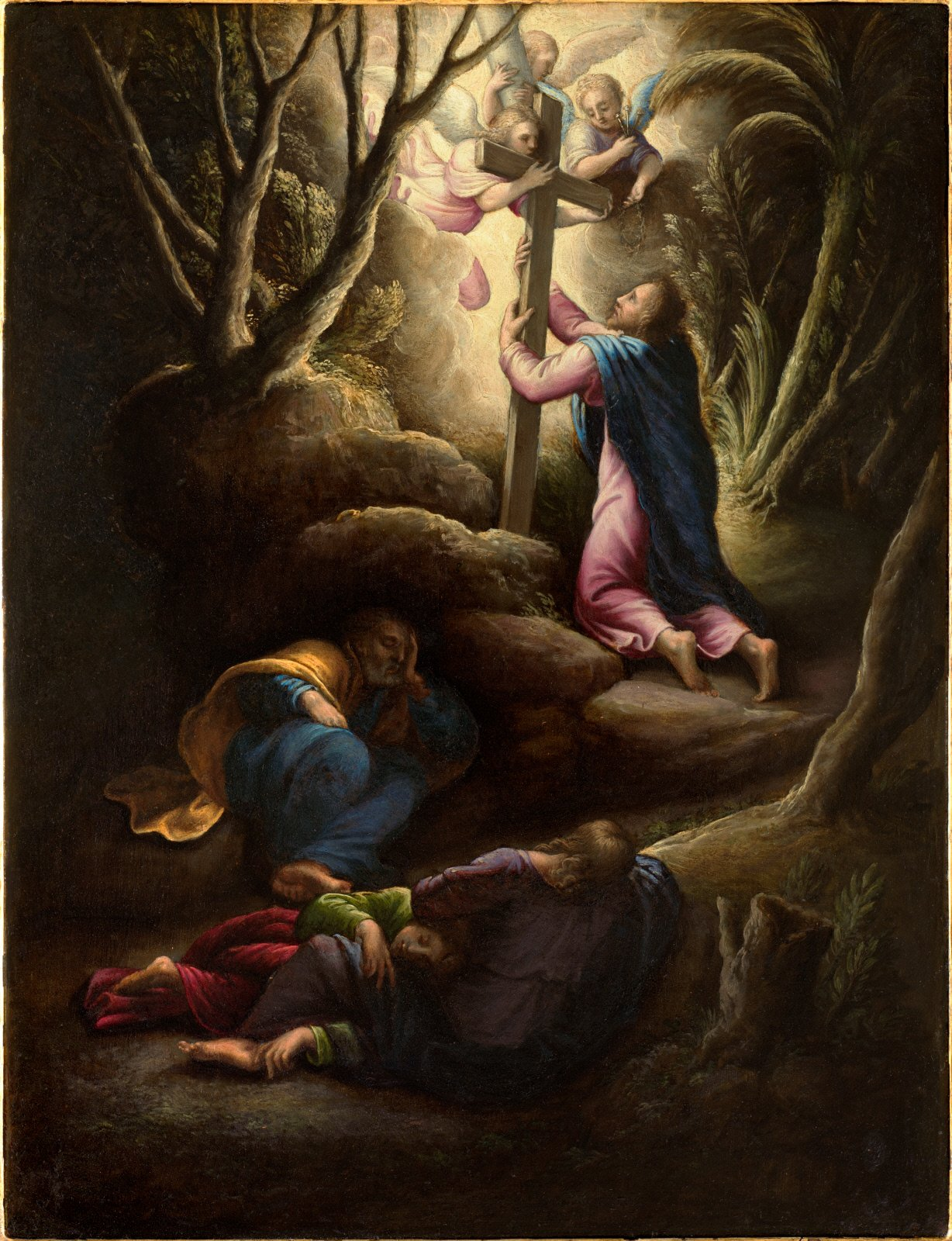
The Agony in the Garden, circa 1595

Giovanni Battista Cremonini (c. 1550 - 1610) was an Italian painter of the Renaissance period.

== Biography ==
Born in Cento, but mostly active in Bologna. His father Matteo Cremonini was also a painter. Giambattista was active in fresco decoration of houses, he was aided by his cousin, Bartolommeo Ramenghi. One of his pupils was Odoardo Fialetti.

Among his works in Bologna are the following:

- Frescoes in the Casa Lucchini
- St Jerome and St Lawrence for Chapel of the Annunciation of the church of San Domenico
- Above entrance to Church of San Francesco in Bologna
- Decorations in Cantone of the Colegio di Spagna
- Crucifix for church of the Scalzi
- History of the building of the church in first chapel of the church of Santa Maria del Monte
- Decorations lateral to Francesco Francia's altarpiece of St Roch in Chiesa della Morte
- Infirmary of San Michele in Bosco
