= Segusium (association) =

Organization

The Segusium (Society for Research and Studies of Susa valley) is a non-profit organization founded by December 7, 1963. The intent of the association is to promote and protect the heritage and landscape of Susa Valley and surrounding areas, by promoting research, on the history, language and local folklore. Post an annual magazine of the same name. The association has been driven by Msgr. Severino Savi; Giulio Fabiano; Lino Bortolo Perdoncin; actually, president is Germano Bellicardi. The magazine has been direct by Clemente Blandino; Augusto Doro; Ferruccio Pari; Alfredo Gilibert; Tullio Forno; from 1999 to 2015 director was Piero Del Vecchio, assisted by an Editorial Committee; from 2016 is Valter Giuliano.

== Activities ==
=== The Segusium magazine ===
The complete series of works published up to now by the association's periodical of the same name, the first issue of which came out in December 1964 [4], has more than 12,500 pages, being in all respects an "encyclopedia of the Valsusian culture", with 646 articles published throughout 2018. The publication of the miscellaneous magazine that takes the name of the association on an almost annual basis has been accompanied over the years by monographic or monothematic issues: on the Treaty of Bruzolo of 1610, on the Novalesa Abbey and on the characteristic village feet of the Mont Cenis, on the agricultural life of the 18th century in the ancient ècarton of Oulx, on the renewal of ecclesiastical buildings in the Upper Susa Valley from the Counter-Reformation to the 18th century, on the archaeological excavations at Maddalena di Chiomonte. Specific studies have also been published on special occasions: for the centenary of the Frejus railway tunnel, for the two thousandth anniversary of the Arch of Augustus of Susa, for the 150th anniversary of the Turin-Bardonecchia railway. In 2018 the magazine published a reasoned index of the 1964-2018 vintages, in paper and also computer format, on the association's website. The periodical has ISSN 2532-5205.

=== Commitment to historical and artistic heritage ===
Over the years the Association has solicited the intervention of individuals and public bodies in favor of the recovery of prestigious buildings and the restoration of works of art, such as the reconstruction of the spire of the bell tower and the restoration of the Church of San Saturnino in Susa (1981), the restoration of the baroque portal of the Capuchin Convent also in Susa - erected in 1614 and the only remaining evidence of the complex - and the monitoring (1987) of the structures of the Chapel of Sant'Andrea alle Ramats (Chiomonte) and the arrangement of the churchyard (1989) thus starting the subsequent architectural restoration and the important frescoes contained therein.
