= Domenico de Benedettis =

Italian painter

Domenico de Benedettis (c. 1610–1678) was an Italian painter of the Baroque period. He was born in Piedimonte d'Alise. He was sent when young to Naples, where he apprenticed with Fabrizio Santafede, and afterward in Rome, worked under Guido Reni. On his return to Naples, he was patronized by the king, and he painted the vault of the church of Santa Maria Donna Regina Nuova, with scenes from the life of the Virgin.
