= Jean Michelin =

French painter (1616–1670)

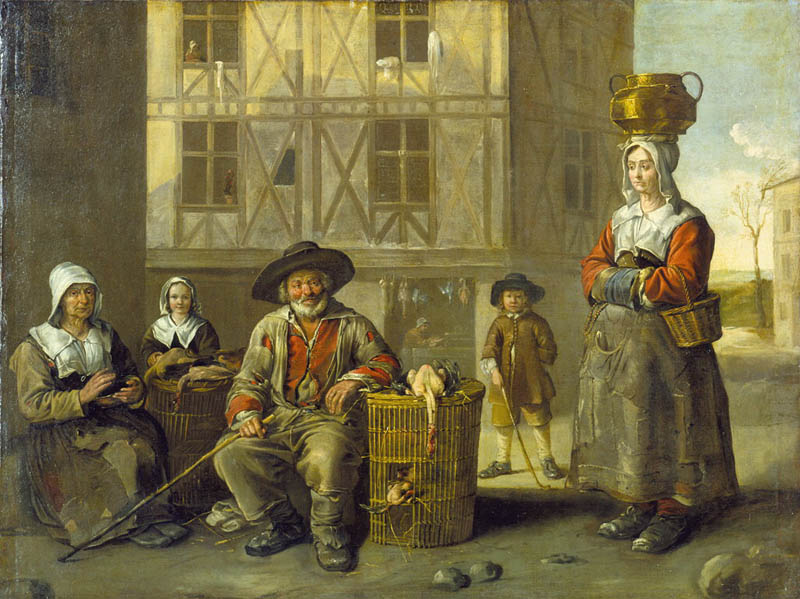
A Poultry Merchant and an Old Woman Warming Her Hands, circa 1652 by Jean Michelin

Jean Michelin (1616–1670) was a French Protestant painter. Michelin started out in his career as primarily a bamboccianti painter. He later branched out into religious themed paintings. One of his notable pieces was a depiction of the Adoration of the Shepherds, which currently resides in The Louvre.
