= Michele Pace del Campidoglio =

Italian painter (1625-1669)

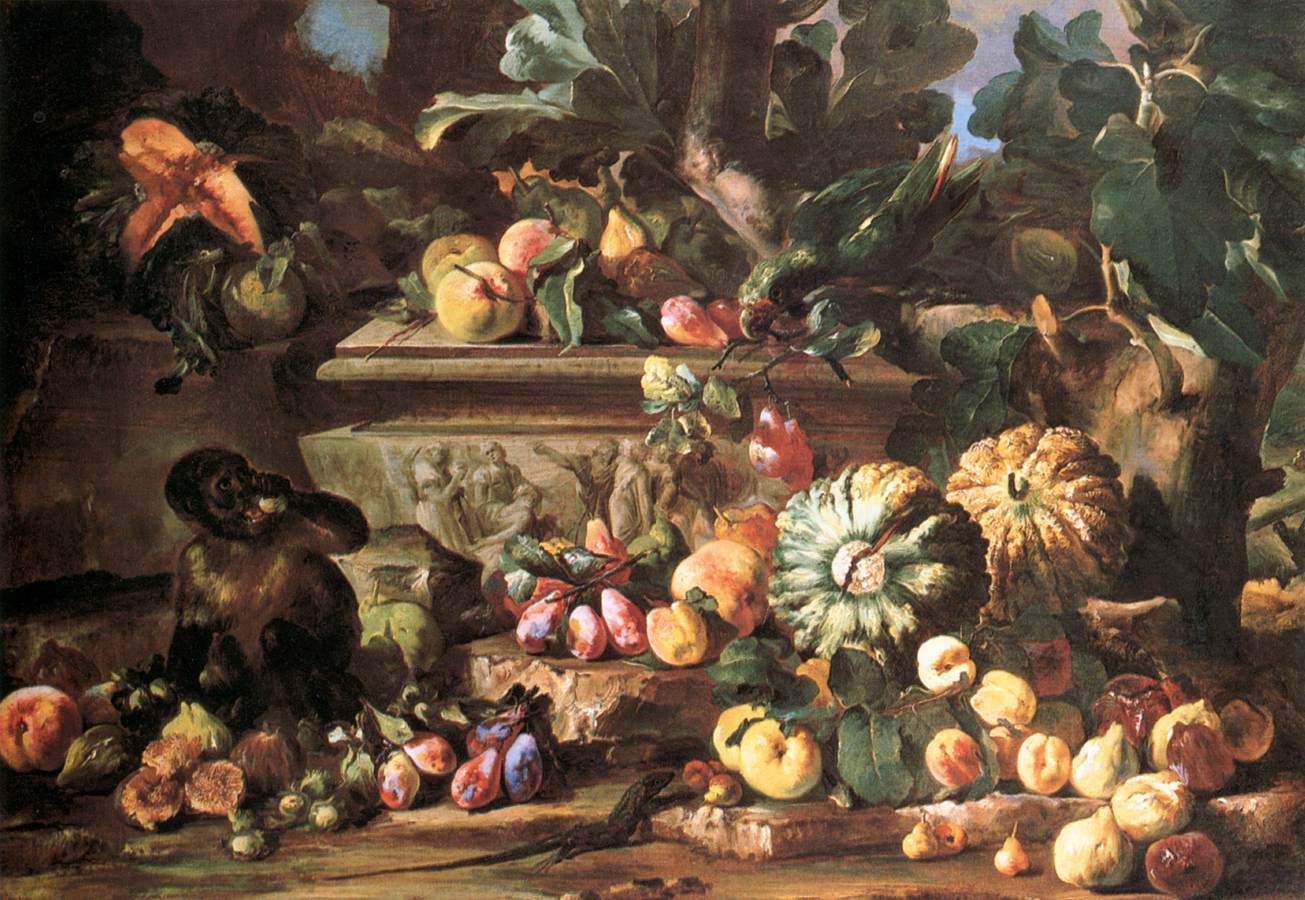
Still life, undated, private collection

Michele Pace del Campidoglio (1625-1669) was an Italian painter of still-life depicting fruit and flowers.

== Biography ==
Pace del Campidoglio was born in Rome or Vitorchiano in 1625. He was called 'Di Campidoglio' from an office he held in the Campidoglio, or Capitol, at Rome. There was a fine picture by him in the collection of John Churchill, 1st Duke of Marlborough at Blenheim, and many others are to be found in England. He died in 1669 in Rome.
