= 1689 in art =

Events from the year 1689 in art.

== Events ==
- King William III of England commissions the Cartoon Gallery at Hampton Court Palace from Sir Christopher Wren to house Raphael's drawings of the Acts of the Apostles.
- John Riley is appointed court painter to William III and Mary II in England.

== Paintings ==
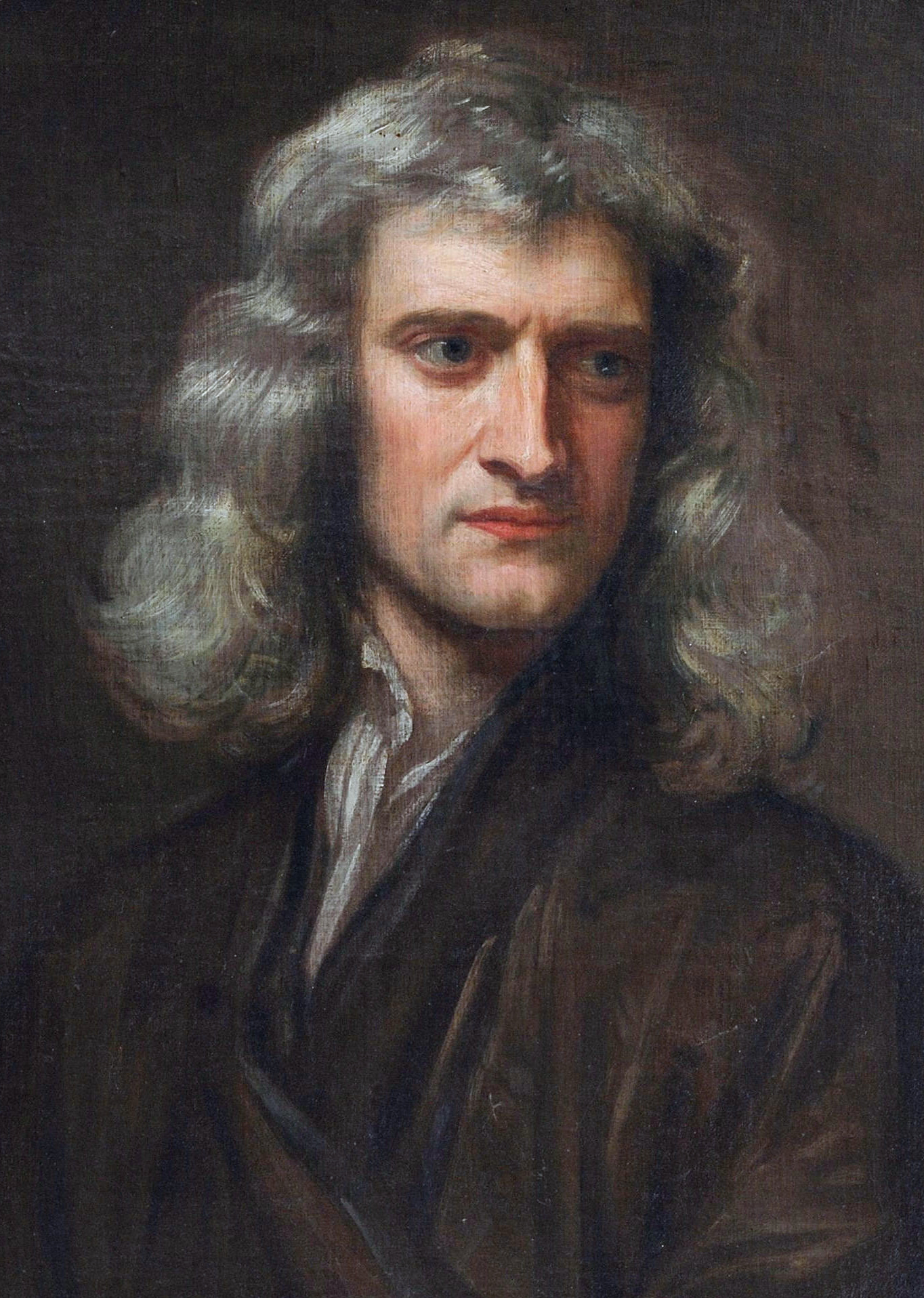
Kneller's portrait of Newton

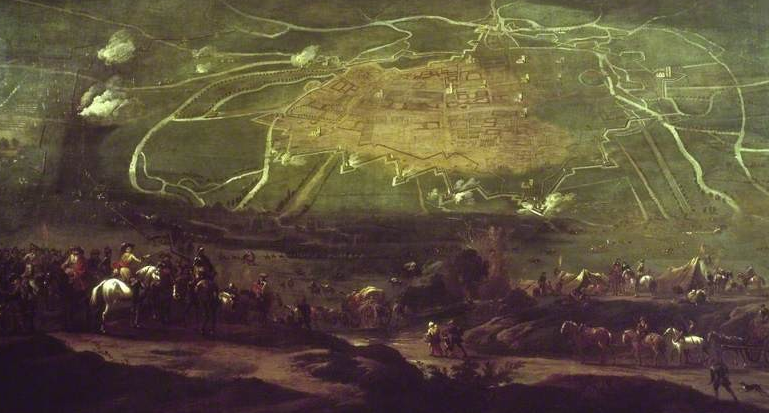
The Siege of Oxford by Jan Wyck

- Meindert Hobbema – The Avenue at Middelharnis
- Godfrey Kneller – Portrait of Isaac Newton
- Jan Wyck – The Siege of Oxford

== Births ==
- July – Szymon Czechowicz, Polish painter (died 1775)
- November 24 – Frans van Mieris jr., Dutch painter (died 1763)
- date unknown
  - Jiao Bingzhen, Chinese painter of the Qing dynasty (died 1726)
  - Giovanni Casini, Italian portrait painter as well as a sculptor (died 1748)
  - Gaspare Diziani, Italian painter of the late-Baroque or Roccoco period (died 1767)
  - Ferdinando Porta, Italian painter and engraver (died 1767)
  - Franz de Paula Ferg, Austrian landscape painter (died 1740)
  - Agostino Veracini, Italian painter and engraver (died 1762)
  - Johann Salomon Wahl, German painter who became court painter in Denmark (died 1765)

== Deaths ==
- January 6 – Baldassare Franceschini, Italian painter of frescoes (born 1611)
- June 10 – Christophe Veyrier, French sculptor (born 1637)
- June 21 – Thomas Blanchet, French painter, draughtsman, architect, sculptor and printmaker (born 1614)
- August – William Lodge, English engraver and printmaker (born 1649)
- August 9 – Dionisio Lazzari, Italian sculptor and architect (born 1617)
- September 13 – Ciro Ferri, Italian Baroque painter (born 1634)
- November 3 – Fyodor Zubov, Russian painter, engraver, miniaturist and illuminator (born 1615)
- November 12 – Justus de Verwer, Dutch painter and illustrator (born 1625)
- November 16 (or 15) – Cornelis Mahu, Flemish painter (born 1613)
- date unknown
  - Alexander Coosemans, Flemish Baroque still-life painter (born 1627)
  - Fabio Cristofari, Italian Baroque painter and mosaicist (born unknown)
  - Gioseffo Danedi, Italian painter (born 1618)
  - Charles Errard, French painter, architect and engraver (born 1606)
  - Gong Xian, Chinese painter (born 1618)
  - Pietro Montanini, Italian painter (born 1619)
  - Cristoforo Serra, Italian painter who was also a militia captain in the Papal troops (born 1600)
