= Elizabeth Alkin =

British nurse and spy (c. 1600 – c. 1655)

Elizabeth Alkin (c. 1600 – c. 1655) (Note: Maureen Bell, writing for the Oxford Dictionary of National Biography, puts the date of death as 1655 and the historian Eric Gruber von Arni states it was December 1655; the historians Diane Purkiss and Marcus Nevitt separately estimate the date as 1654.) was a publisher, nurse and spy for the Parliamentarian forces during the English Civil Wars (1642–1651). She was also commonly known as Parliament Joan, one of many derogatory names she was called by royalist sympathisers.

Little is known about Alkin's early life. Her husband was arrested and hanged in 1643 by the royalists during the First English Civil War for spying for the Parliamentarians; Alkin continued her husband's work, spying in Oxford, even during the city's siege.

By 1648 Alkin was involved in selling and then publishing Parliamentary newsbooks—the forerunners of newspapers. She used her role as a vendor to track down and report several publishers of royalist material. After the civil war, Alkin nursed casualties of the First Anglo-Dutch War, initially in Portsmouth, then Harwich and Ipswich. With her health failing she returned to London. It is presumed she died shortly afterwards, possibly over the 1655 Christmas period.

== Pre-civil war ==
Little is known of Alkin until 1645; because of comments about her age made later in life, her date of birth is taken to be around 1600. According to the historian Eric Gruber von Arni, she was born Elizabeth Dearing or Deering. Several sources state her husband was Francis Alkin, (Note: These include the historians Diane Purkiss, in her history of the English Civil War, and Maureen Bell, in the Oxford Dictionary of National Biography.) although according to Gruber von Arni, she married a George Alkin at St Margaret's church, Westminster, on 12 November 1635. The couple had three children.

== Civil war spy and nurse ==
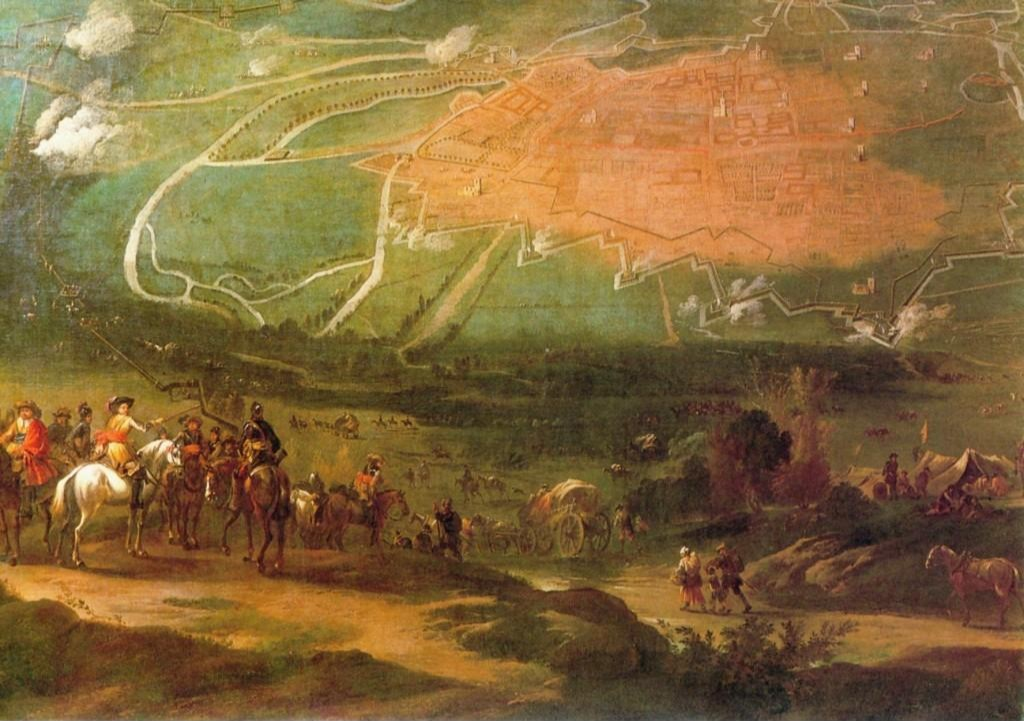
The Siege of Oxford by Jan Wyck, 1689

In the early part of the English Civil War, Alkin's husband was a spy for the Parliamentarians; both he and Alkin were working in Oxford—the royalist wartime capital—where she was tending wounded Parliamentarian prisoners. He was denounced as a spy by Stephen Fossett, the surgeon to the royalist governor of Oxford, and was hanged in summer 1643. Despite the loss of her husband, Alkin carried on working in Oxford, both tending the prisoners and spying for the Parliamentarians. She continued to work in Oxford—freely entering and leaving the town—during its sieges (1644–1646).

In 1645 Alkin was employed by the Earl of Essex and Sir William Waller as a spy for the Parliamentarians; she received a similar commission from Sir Thomas Fairfax two years later. Parliamentary records show that in 1645 she received three payments totalling £6 from the Committee for the Advance of Money for uncovering the activities of George Mynnes, a Surrey-based iron merchant who was supplying metal to the royalist forces. (Note: £6 in 1645 equates to approximately £1,200 in 2025, according to calculations based on the Consumer Price Index measure of inflation.) When the war started, he had supplied the royalists with four hundred tonnes (390 long tons; 440 short tons) of iron and had £40,000-worth of wire and iron cached around the country. (Note: £40,000 in 1645 equates to approximately £8,000,000 in 2025, according to calculations based on the Consumer Price Index measure of inflation.)

In January 1647 Alkin petitioned Parliament for her to take possession of the sequestered house of Fossett, the man who had denounced her husband. This was granted, but before she could move in, Fossett filed—and won—a civil suit to overturn the seizure. In October that year she was granted £50. (Note: £50 in 1653 equates to approximately £9,800 in 2025, according to calculations based on the Consumer Price Index measure of inflation.) Alkin was paid much less than other spies in Parliamentarian service; some were paid as much as £200 a month, while her superior was paid £400 a year. (Note: £200 in 1653 equates to approximately £39,200 in 2025, and £400 in 1653 equates to approximately £78,340 in 2025, according to calculations based on the Consumer Price Index measure of inflation.)

During the 1648 siege of Colchester in the Second English Civil War Alkin again nursed Parliamentarian soldiers and was awarded five payments for her work between August and October. She was also given travelling expenses for a trip to London which, Gruber suggests, was likely for the transportation of casualties to military hospitals.

== Newsbook seller, publisher and spy ==
The Impartial Scout of June 1650, showing Alkin's name

In the seventeenth century daily news was published in newsbooks which tended to be small eight-page publications, the forerunners of newspapers. They were usually sold on the street by what the historian Bob Clarke describes as "semi-destitute female hawkers, known as Mercury Women". In Parliamentarian-held areas, those publications supporting the royalist cause were closed down and the publishers prosecuted; Alkin became involved in uncovering those behind royalist publications and for some of her work she adopted the pseudonymic surname "Strof" or "Stroffe". In 1648 the royalist newsbooks the Mercurius Melancholicus and the Parliament Kite both referred to her attempts to uncover them, and the following year the royalist publication Mercurius Pragmaticus called her an "old bitch" who had "as pocky a Nose (for a scent –) as any of her Masters" and who could "smell out a loyall-hearted man as soon as the best blood-hound in the army" [sic]. Similarly, Edward Crouch, another royalist publisher, said in 1650 that Alkin was close to finding him; he described her as being fat, about fifty years old and one "who was now the most effective ferret for the government and Stationers' Hall" (the building where the government agents were based).

It is possible that Alkin was behind the capture and arrest of the editor of the Mercurius Catholicus, the Roman Catholic priest Thomas Budd, in 1648. (Note: The historian Marcus Nevitt writes that Alkin's involvement is referred to in J. B. Williams's 1908 work A History of English Journalism to the Foundation of the Gazette, but that Williams "Offer[s] no evidence" to back up the statement.) In 1653 she petitioned for Budd's release for three months as he was in ill health. One of those she certainly uncovered was William Dugard, who ran four presses at Merchant Taylors' School in London. He was printing copies of Defensio Regia pro Carolo primo, Claudius Salmasius's defence of Charles I; he was imprisoned in February 1650. The following year she was paid £10 for discovering the printers of Edward Hall's work Manus testium lingua testium, and received further recompense from the Committee for the Advance of Money for other, unknown services. Alkin was due a reward for uncovering Dugard and was given between £200 and 300; (Note: £200 in 1648 equates to approximately £30,000 in 2025, and £300 equates to approximately £45,000 in 2025, according to calculations based on the Consumer Price Index measure of inflation.) this was kept from her by William Mills, the official to whom Alkin had initially reported the presence of the presses. The loss of money nearly led to Alkin's imprisonment for debt, but she petitioned for funds and was awarded £40; the money was deducted from the balance that had not yet been paid to Mills. (Note: £40 in 1648 equates to approximately £5,900 in 2025, according to calculations based on the Consumer Price Index measure of inflation.)

Alkin petitioned for further funds and, on 2 June 1649, the House of Commons instructed the Council of State to provide her with a house for life and further funds. The following year the Council advised that she should receive annual rents from the king's slaughterhouse to provide her with a source of income; this amounted to £7 a year. (Note: £7 in 1649 equates to approximately £1,100 in 2025, according to calculations based on the Consumer Price Index measure of inflation.)

Although Alkin also acted as one of the newsbook sellers, between 1650 and 1651 she was involved in publishing issues of different, short-lived newsbooks, including The Impartial Scout, The Moderne Intelligencer, Mercurius Anglicus (formerly a royalist title which she appropriated) and Mercurius Scoticus, or, The Royal Messenger. The historian Marcus Nevitt says that Alkin was "reappropriating Royalist titles for Parliamentarian consumption", and Clarke agrees, adding that Alkin may have chosen to use formerly royalist titles, or royalist-sounding names to win the confidence of royalist sympathisers, and get them to reveal the location of illicit printers. In total she produced ten newsbooks of differing names; The Impartial Scout is the only one in which her name appears.

The Third English Civil War ended in September 1651. In 1652 the rents Alkin received from the king's slaughterhouse stopped, as the property was sold. She petitioned for a replacement property, but was instead given a payment of £3 10 shillings and given rooms in the Palace of Westminster in lieu of her pension. (Note: £3 10s in 1652 equates to approximately £600 in 2025, according to calculations based on the Consumer Price Index measure of inflation.)

== Post-civil war nursing ==
When the news broke in February 1653 of the casualties sustained in the Battle of Portland—part of the First Anglo-Dutch War—Alkin petitioned the Council of State to employ her as a nurse at Dover.

That your petitioner hath ever since bene faithfull and serviceable to the State upon all occasions in these late warres in which she day and night hazarded her life and was from time to time a greate help to the distressed impresoned [i.e. imprisoned] and maymed soldiers by releiving them. That she being still desirous to continue her best indeavours amongst them.
Your petitioner humbly beseecheth your honors to be pleased to appoint her to be one of the nurses for the maymed seamen at Dover.

The council agreed and Alkin was given a warrant to aid the wounded in Portsmouth. She assisted Daniel Whistler in setting up a network of casualty reception stations in Portsmouth, Harwich and East Anglia; the stations treated both English and Dutch casualties. While in Portsmouth, Alkin took a convoy of 34 serious casualties the 80 miles (130 km) to London. She was paid £13 6s for her work. (Note: £13 6s in 1653 equates to approximately £2,600 in 2025, according to calculations based on the Consumer Price Index measure of inflation.)

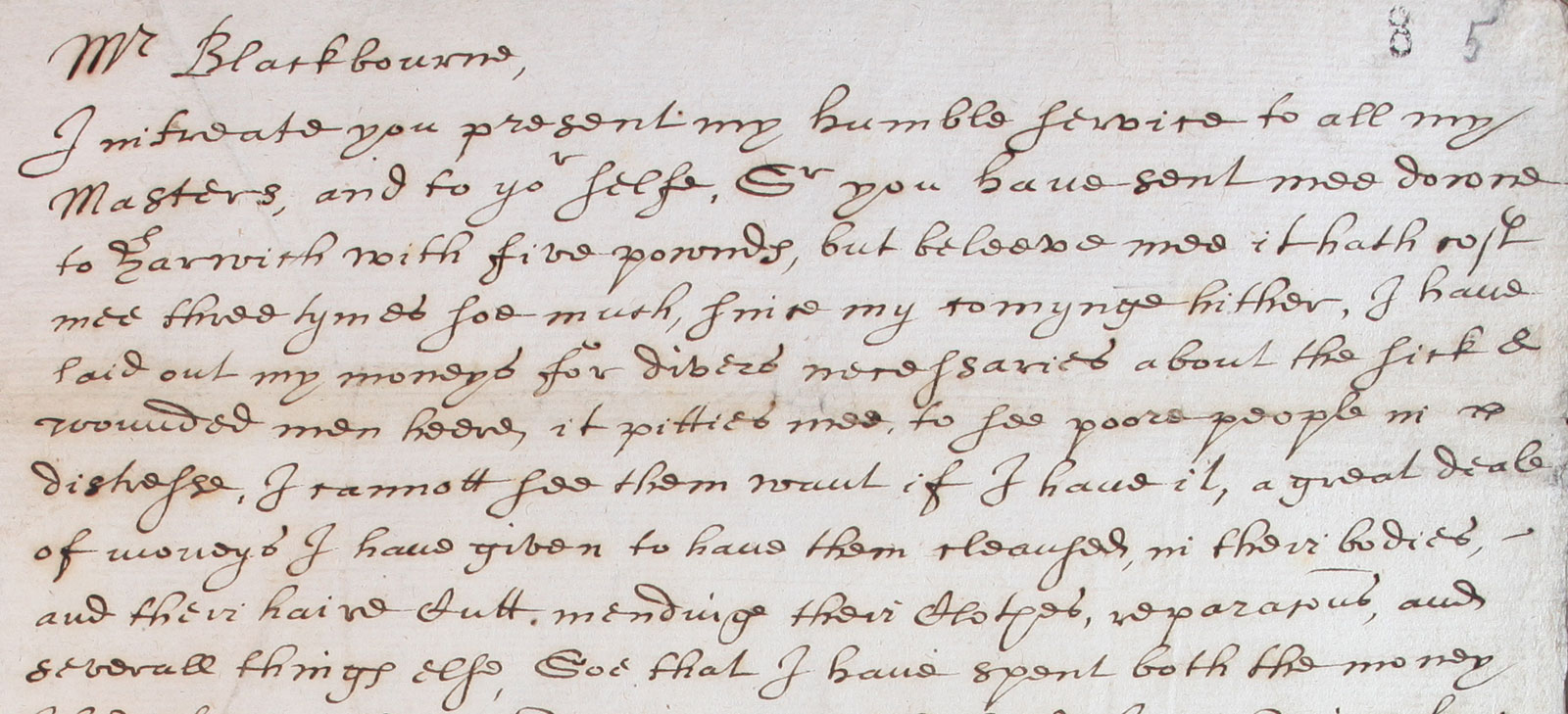
Letter from Alkin to the secretary of the Admiralty Commissioners, July 1655

In mid-1653 Alkin was nursing in Harwich. With funds from the government being slow to arrive—she had only been given £5 when she arrived—Alkin found nurses to assist her and paid them from her own pocket; 200 wounded sailors soon arrived in the town. (Note: £5 in 1653 equates to approximately £1,000 in 2025, according to calculations based on the Consumer Price Index measure of inflation.) The war put a strain on the available finances and there was little money available for the care of Dutch prisoners. She petitioned for funds, explaining "seeing their want and misery to be very great I could not but have some pity towards them (though they be enemies)". Given £10 from her superiors, she immediately spent £6 on the Dutch prisoners in Harwich and then more at Ipswich. (Note: £10 in 1653 equates to approximately £2,000 in 2025 while £6 in 1653 equates to approximately £1,200 in 2025, according to calculations based on the Consumer Price Index measure of inflation.)

In December 1653 Alkin once again turned to informing when she provided evidence about "the murder committed by the Portuguese upon the new Exchange". The case concerned Dom Pantaleon Sa, the brother of the Portuguese ambassador, accompanied by Portuguese and Maltese friends, were involved in a disturbance at the new Exchange in which a passer-by, a Mr Greenway, was shot and killed. Alkin received £10 for the information.

Alkin left Harwich an ill woman and returned to London. To pay for the doctor and two nurses that attended her, she was forced to sell many of her belongings. In February 1654 she wrote to Robert Blackborne, the secretary to the Admiralty Commissioners, asking for payment of funds that were owed to her. She told Blackborne that "I am a very weak woman, having many infirmities upon me". That April she was forced to write to the commissioners once again when she and thirty others were instructed to vacate their residences in the Palace of Whitehall as Oliver Cromwell, the Lord Protector, wanted them for himself. She found new premises in the parish of St Margaret, Westminster. Alkin was paid £10 in May and again in September. She was paid a further twenty English marks (£13 6s 8d) around May 1655. (Note: £13 6s 8d in 1653 equates to approximately £3,100 in 2025, according to calculations based on the Consumer Price Index measure of inflation.)

The petition for financial relief from May 1655 is the last recorded note on her, and it is presumed that she died soon afterwards; Gruber von Arni suggests her death may have been over the Christmas period of 1655.

== "Parliament Joan" ==
Parliament Joan is a nickname by which Alkin is also commonly known, although her enemies gave her several derogatory labels. The historian J. J. Keevil describes it as a code name. Alkin never referred to herself as "Parliament Joan", signing all her documents using her full name or initials, although later in life when writing to a parliamentarian official, she would sign herself "Elizabeth Alkin alias Joane".

According to the Anglicist Karen Britland, the use of the name "Parliament Joan" by officials was "to undermine a sense of Alkin's trustworthiness and the validity of her actions". The point is raised by Marcus Nevitt, in his study of the role of women in revolutionary publishing, as he considers that through the use of such an alias, "the very authorities who were paying her for the veracity of her intelligence were simultaneously denying its validity, equating it with the mere gossip of a very different kind of hired help".

The historian J. B. Williams, in his history of early English journalism, observes that at the time, a "Joan" was "a name given to any ill-mannered or ill-kempt rustic woman, or scullery-maid, who had to do dirty work". The historian Nadine Akkerman considers that the term was also used in a derogatory sense by Shakespeare to show a woman was not a lady. (Note: Akkerman quotes from Love's Labour's Lost: "Some men must love my lady, and some Joan".)

== Notes and references ==
=== Sources ===
==== Books ====
- Akkerman, Nadine (2018). Invisible Agents: Women and Espionage in Seventeenth-Century Britain. Oxford: Oxford University Press. ISBN 978-0-1988-2301-8.
- Atkin, Malcolm (1998). Cromwell's Crowning Mercy: The Battle of Worcester 1651. Stroud, Gloucestershire: Sutton Publishing. ISBN 978-0-7509-1888-6.
- Britland, Karen (2022). "'In the Hollow of his Wooden Leg': The Transmission of Civil War Materials, 1642–9". In Peacey, Jason; Lake, Peter (eds.). Insolent Proceedings. Manchester: Manchester University Press. pp. 88–106. ISBN 978-1-5261-6500-8.
- Clarke, Bob (2004). From Grub Street to Fleet Street. London: Routledge. ISBN 978-0-7546-5007-2.
- Conboy, Martin (2004). Journalism: A Critical History. London: SAGE. ISBN 978-0-7619-4099-9.
- Gruber von Arni, Eric (2001). Justice to the Maimed Soldier: Nursing, Medical Care and Welfare for Sick and Wounded Soldiers and their Families During the English Civil Wars and Interregnum, 1642–1660. Aldershot, Hampshire: Ashgate. ISBN 978-0-7546-0476-1.
- McElligott, Jason (2006). "'A Couple of Hundred Squabbling Small Tradesmen'? Censorship, the Stationers' Company and the State in early Modern England". In Raymond, Joad (ed.). News Networks in Seventeenth-Century Britain and Europe. London: Routledge. pp. 85–102. ISBN 978-0-4153-6008-1.
- Nevitt, Marcus (2006). Women and the Pamphlet Culture of Revolutionary England, 1640–1660. Aldershot, Hampshire: Ashgate Publishing. ISBN 978-0-7546-4115-5.
- Nevitt, Marcus (2013). "Women in the Business of Revolutionary News: Elizabeth Alkin, "Parliament Joan" and the Commonwealth Newsbook". In Raymond, Joad (ed.). News, Newspapers and Society in Early Modern Britain. London: Routledge. pp. 84–108. ISBN 978-1-134-57199-4.
- Purkiss, Diane (2007). The English Civil War. London: Harper. ISBN 978-0-0071-5062-5.
- Raymond, Joad (2003). Pamphlets and Pamphleteering in Early Modern Britain. Cambridge: Cambridge University Press. ISBN 978-0-521-02877-6.
- Williams, J. B. (1908). A History of English Journalism to the Foundation of the Gazette. London: Longmans, Green. OCLC 59066348.

==== Journals and magazines ====
- Keevil, J. J. (1957). "Elizabeth Alkin "Alias" Parliament Joan". Bulletin of the History of Medicine. 31 (1): 17–28. JSTOR 44446508. PMID 13426667.

==== Websites ====
- Bell, Maureen (2004). "Alkin, Elizabeth [nicknamed Parliament Joan]". Oxford Dictionary of National Biography (online ed.). Oxford University Press. doi:10.1093/ref:odnb/57433. (Subscription, Wikipedia Library access or UK public library membership required.)
- Clark, Gregory (2023). "The Annual RPI and Average Earnings for Britain, 1209 to Present (New Series)". MeasuringWorth. Archived from the original on 1 April 2023.
- "Military Medicine Timeline". National Health Service. Archived from the original on 23 June 2016.
