= Verwer =

Verwer is a surname. Notable people with the surname include:

- Abraham de Verwer (1585–1650), Dutch painter
- George Verwer (born 1938), Christian missionary
