= Daniel Whistler =

English physician

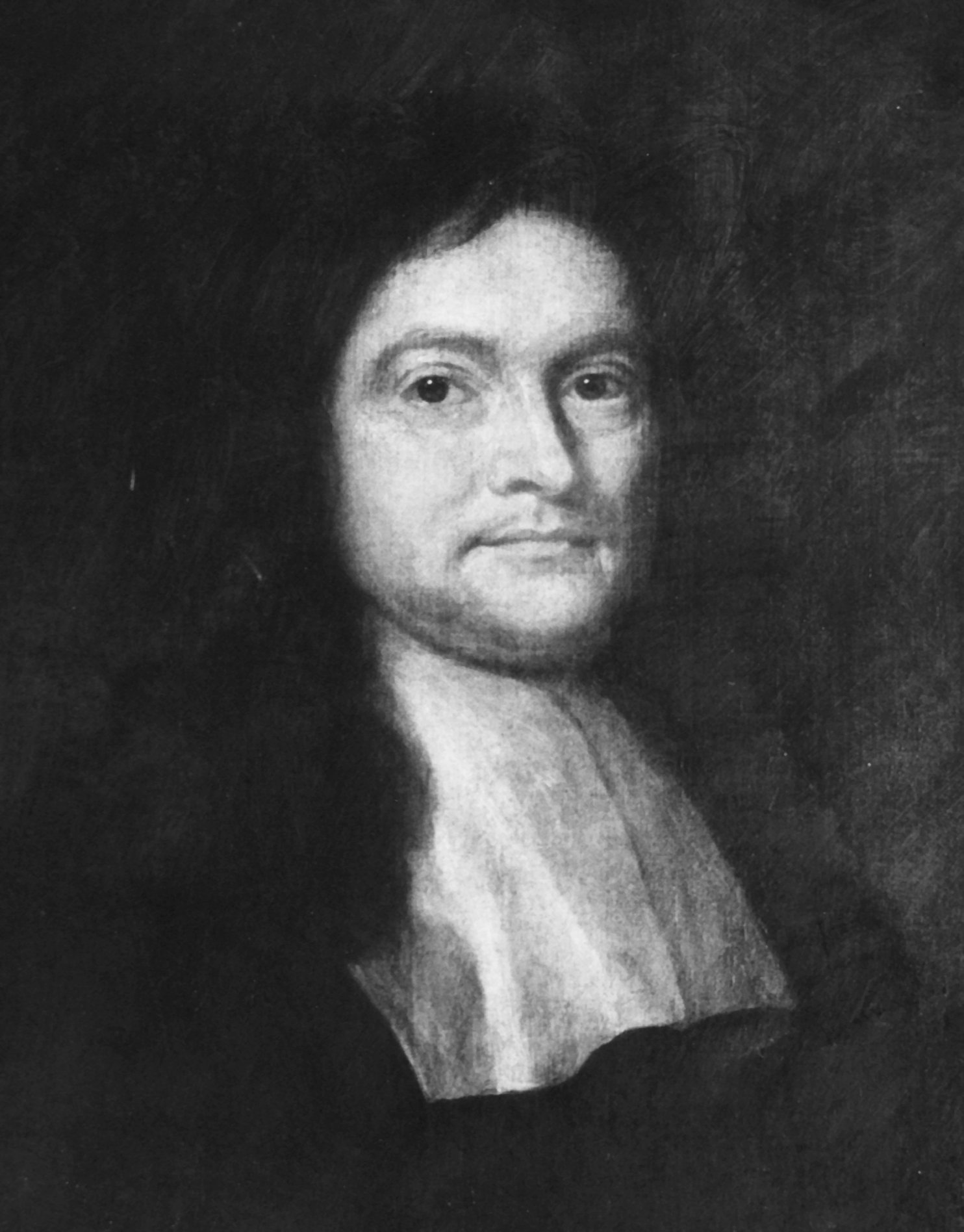

Daniel Whistler (1619–1684) was an English physician.

== Life ==
The son of William Whistler of Elvington, Oxfordshire, he was born at Walthamstow in Essex in 1619. He was educated at the school of Thame, Oxfordshire, and entered Merton College, Oxford, in January 1639. He graduated B.A. in 1642. On 8 August 1642 he began the study of physic at the Leiden University, where he graduated M.D. on 19 October 1645, having in the interval returned to Oxford to take his M.A. degree (8 February 1644). He was incorporated M.D. at Oxford on 20 May 1647, and was elected a fellow of the College of Physicians on 13 December 1649.

On 13 June 1648 he was elected Gresham Professor of Geometry, and was at the same time Linacre reader at Oxford. In 1653, during the First Anglo-Dutch War, Whistler was assisted by Elizabeth Alkin in setting up a network of casualty reception stations in Portsmouth and East Anglia. The stations treated both English and Dutch casualties. In October 1653 Whistler was asked to accompany Bulstrode Whitelocke to Sweden; his first case was a broken arm, and his next a broken leg, and he himself set both. He spoke Latin and French, and wrote Latin verses on the abdication of Queen Christina of Sweden, which are printed in the Journal of the Swedish Embassy. In July 1654 he returned to London.

At the College of Physicians he delivered the Harveian oration in 1659, was twelve times censor, registrar from 1674 to 1682, treasurer in 1682, and in 1683 president. He married in 1657, and died on 11 May 1684, while president, of pneumonia, and was buried in Christ Church, Newgate Street. His house was in the college in Warwick Lane. He was thought agreeable by Samuel Pepys, who often dined and supped with him. They walked together to view the ravages of the Great Fire of London of 1666. John Evelyn also liked his conversation. He was negligent as registrar, and as president of the College of Physicians took little care of its property.

== Works ==
His inaugural dissertation at Leyden, read 18 October 1645, De Morbo puerili Anglorum, quern patrio idiomate indigense vocant "The Rickets,"' is his only published work, and is the first printed book on rickets. He reprinted it in 1684. The disease was at that time the subject of much active observation by Francis Glisson, and a committee, seven in number, of the College of Physicians which worked with him had made the subject well known, though Glisson's elaborate Tractatus de Rachitide did not appear till 1650. Whistler's thesis contains no original observations, but many hypotheses and reports of the views of others who are not named. It is clearly based on the current discussion, and takes nothing from the originality of Glisson's work. He proposes the name 'Paedossplanchnosteocaces' for the disease, but no subsequent writer has used the word.

== Sources ==
- This article incorporates text from a publication now in the public domain: "Whistler, Daniel". Dictionary of National Biography. London: Smith, Elder & Co. 1885–1900.
