= Justus de Verwer =

Dutch painter and illustrator

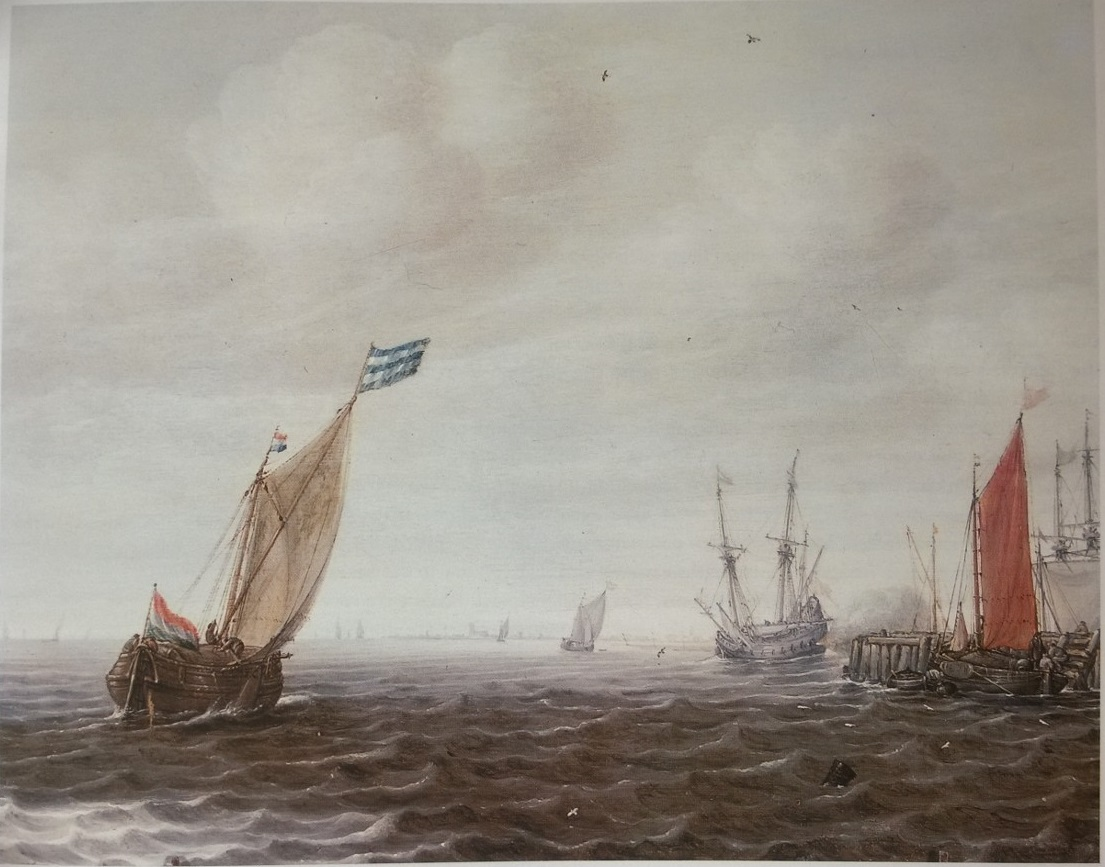
Pier with Ships by Justus de Verwer, 1680s

Justus de Verwer (Amsterdam, c. 1626 - Amsterdam, 12 November 1689) was a Dutch painter and illustrator from the period of the Golden Age.

De Verwer was the son and pupil of Abraham de Verwer and followed him in style and theme. He produced primarily marine art. From 1651 to 1656 he was employed by the Dutch East India Company and traveled to the East Indies. Then he settled in Amsterdam, where he married Fijtje Caspers in 1659.
