= Abraham de Verwer =

Dutch painter

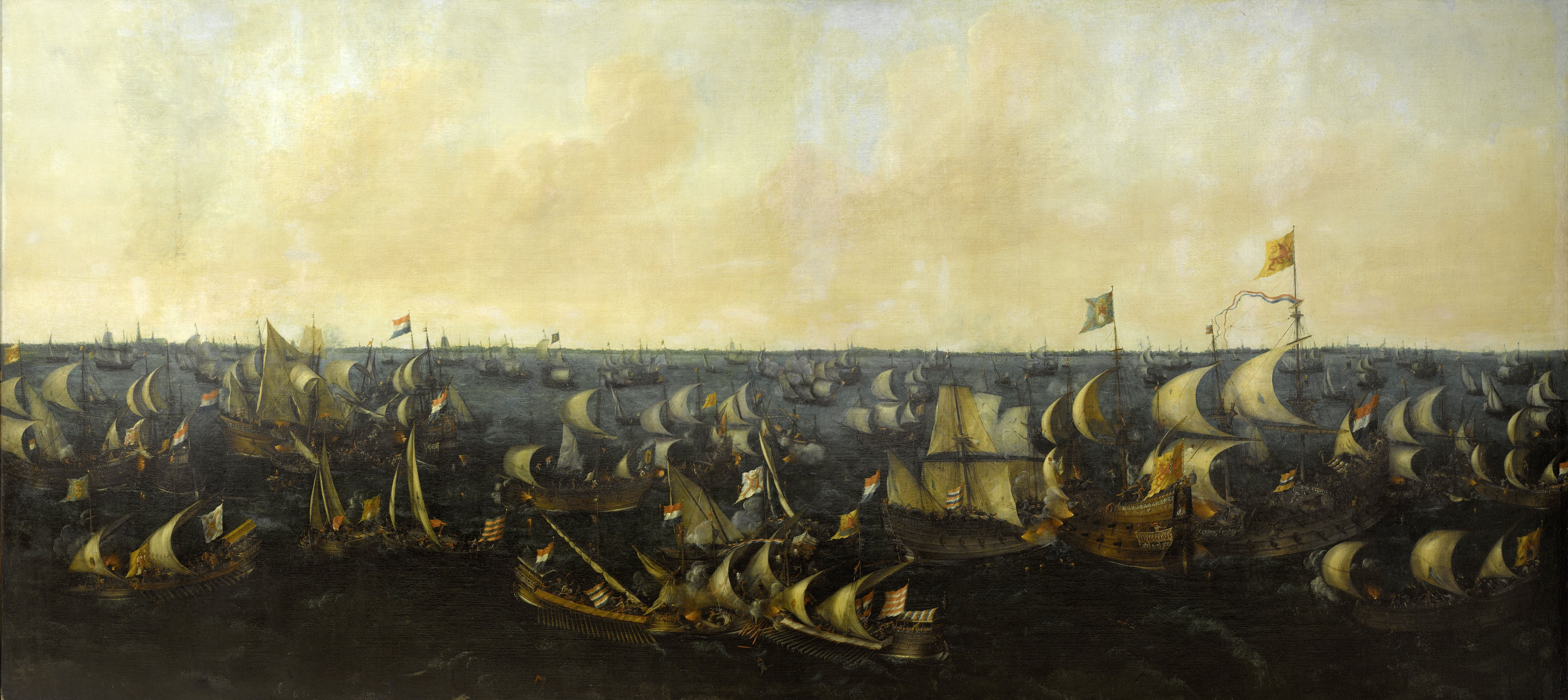
Battle of the Zuider Zee, October 6, 1573

Abraham de Verwer (1585, Haarlem – 19 August 1650 (buried), Amsterdam), was a Dutch Golden Age painter of cityscapes, (river) landscapes and seascapes.

== Biography ==
He was also called Abraham de Verweer van Burghstrate.

It is unknown who taught him to paint, but he was noted in his wife's testament in Haarlem in 1607 as a "schrijnwerker" or cabinet-maker, and in 1614 he was noted in an Amsterdam estate inventory as a painter.

He travelled in France from 1637 to 1639, and seven views along the Seine in Paris are known, as well as three more at the Musée Carnavalet and one at the Institut Néerlandais, Paris. Frederick Henry, Prince of Orange, was a client who purchased two cityscapes of the Louvre and two other paintings for 400 guilders in 1639. Verwer returned to Amsterdam, where he obtained citizenship on 23 January 1641, and bought a house on Prinsengracht in 1642.

He was the father of the Amsterdam poet Catharina Verwers and the Amsterdam painter Justus de Verwer.

He was buried in the Oude Kerk, Amsterdam.

Two views of Paris in about 1640 (Musée Carnavalet)

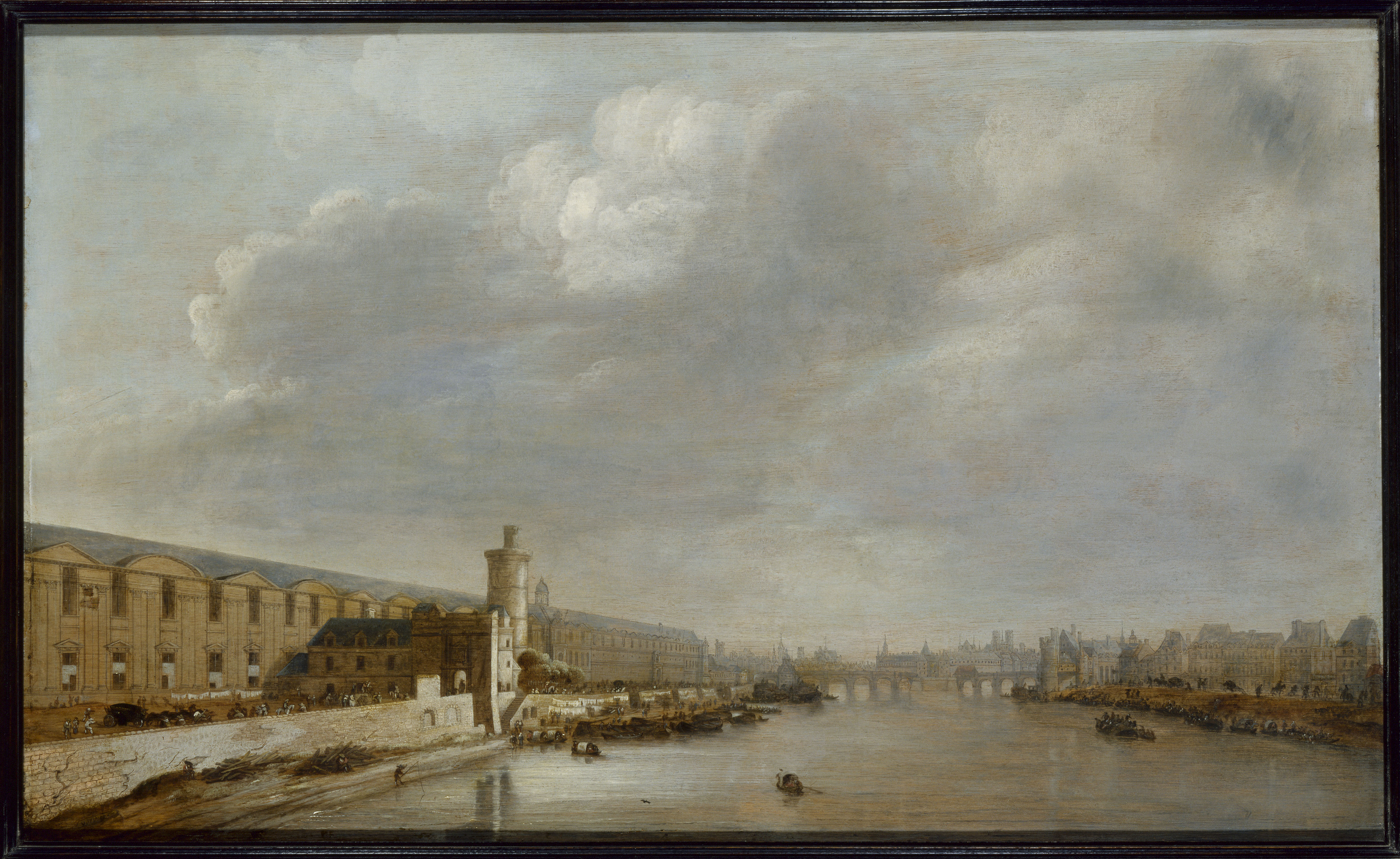
The Grande Galerie of the Louvre

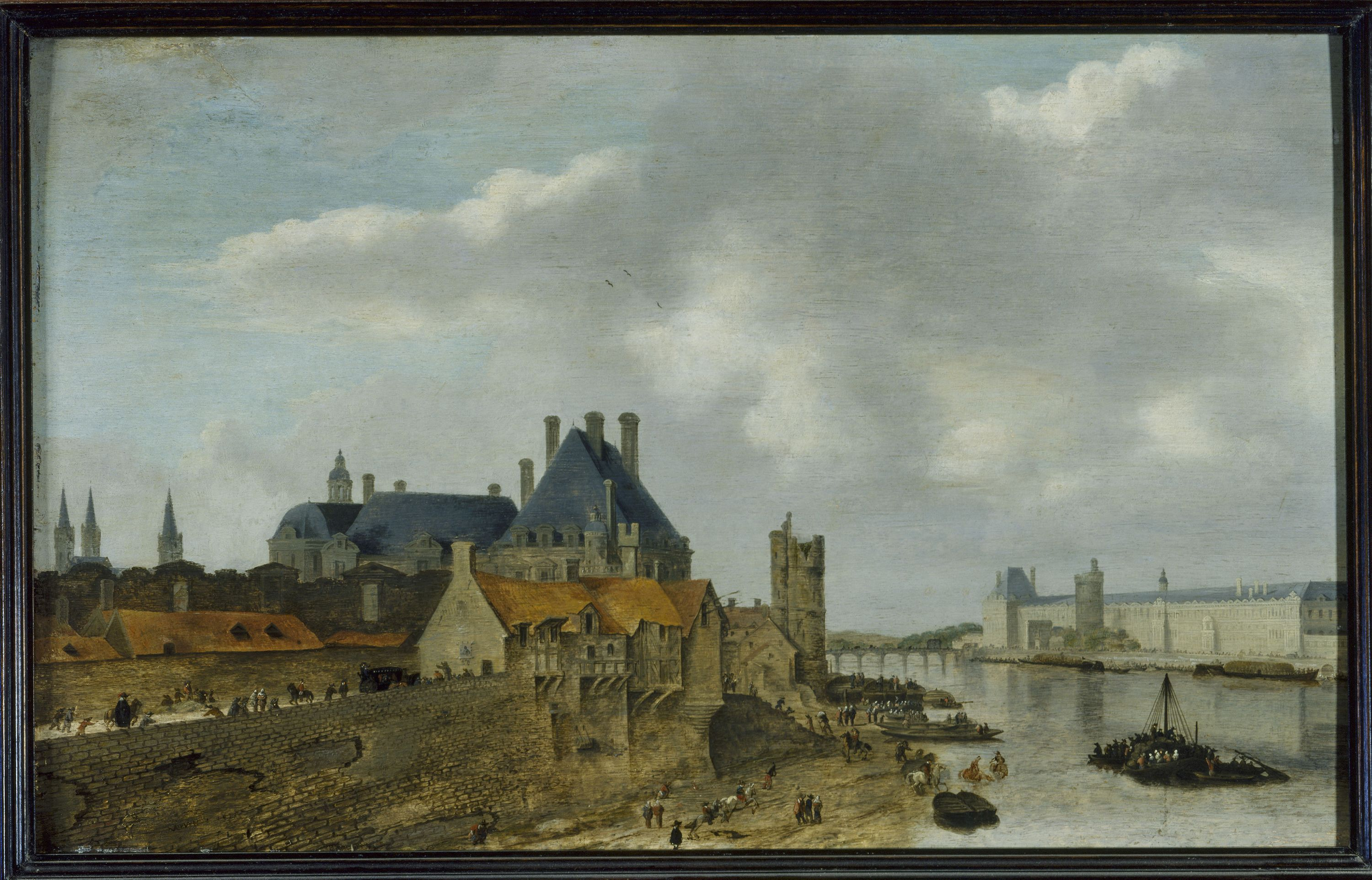
The Hôtel de Nevers (left bank) and the Tour de Nesle
