= Franz de Paula Ferg =

Austrian artist (1689–1740)

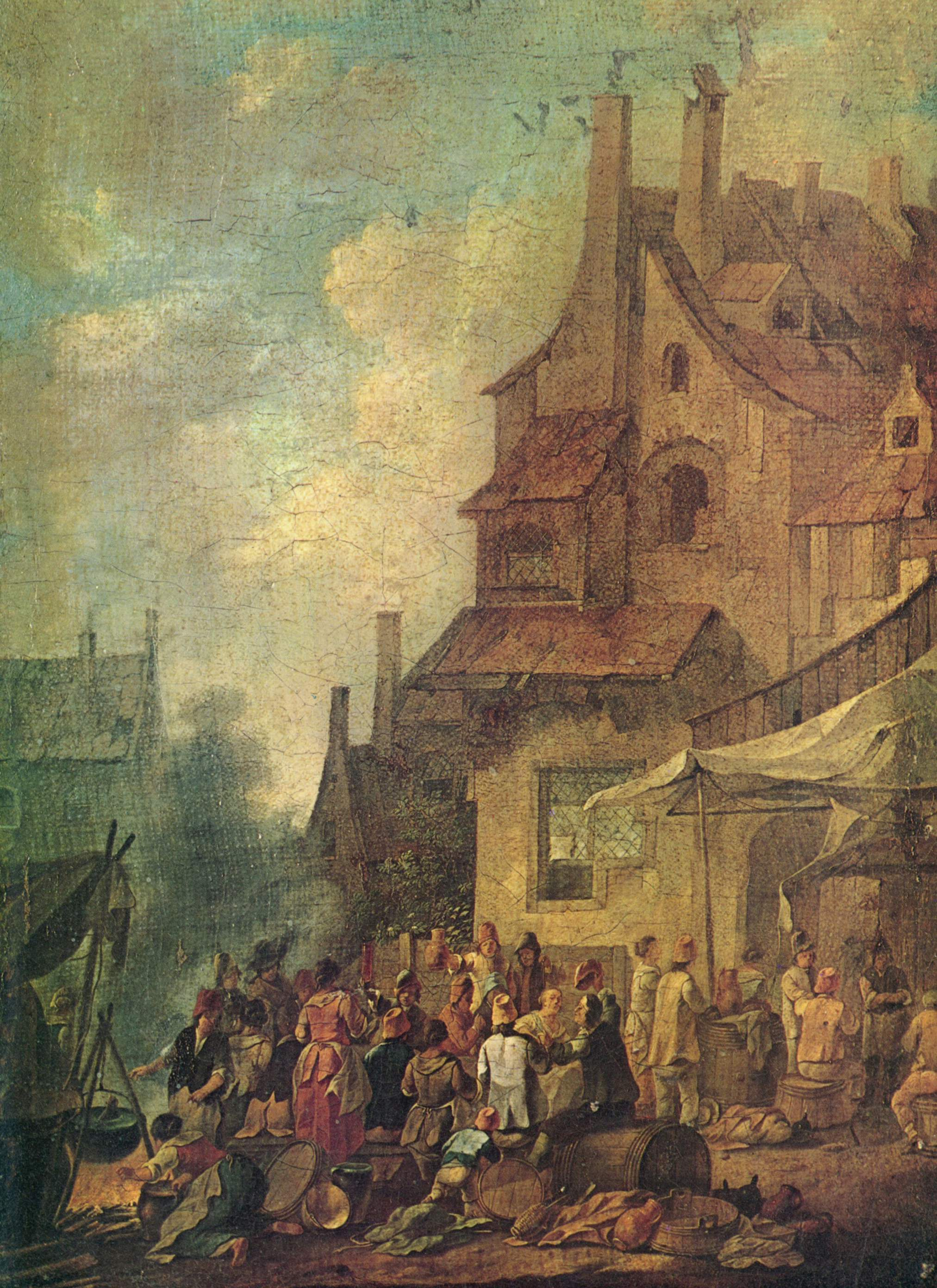
Franz de Paula Ferg, Market Day, Kunsthalle Hamburg

Franz de Paula Ferg (2 May 1689 – 1740), also known as Francis Paul Ferg, was an Austrian painter, draughtsman, and printmaker. He painted primarily scenes of daily life, such as people interacting in markets and villages.

== Life ==
Ferg was born in Vienna on 2 May 1689, the son of the history painter Adam Pancraz Ferg, from whom he received his initial artistic education. His father then placed him under a painter called Baschueber, with whom he remained for four years. He returned to his father's house, and studied the engravings of Callot and Le Clerc, whose peculiarities proved a great influence on his style. He then studied at Vienna under Hans Graaf, a painter of small landscapes with figures, fairs, etc., but more permanently under Joseph Orient, a well-known landscape painter, in whose house he lived for three years, often painting the figures in his landscapes. In 1718 Ferg he left for Vienna and settled for some years at Bamberg. Meeting with the landscape-painter Alexander Thiele at Leipzig, he went with him to Dresden, and worked with him there for some time. He soon gained a great reputation for small landscapes and sea-pieces with figures, and for fairs and peasant scenes in the style of Ostade, Berchem, and Poelenburg. These were executed, often on copper, with great care and industry, well-coloured and exquisitely finished.

He eventually settled in London. Although he found plenty of employment there, he drifted into depressed circumstances. According to some sources this was due to his own irresponsibility and an ill-advised marriage. This version of events was, however, disputed by Noel Desenfans, who attributed Ferg's difficulties to a head injury caused by a blow from falling roof-tile, which rendered him unable to paint. One night in 1740 he was found dead in the street, not far from his lodgings, in a condition of great destitution.

His pictures are frequently met with in private collections in England and in public galleries abroad, notably Brunswick, Dresden, and Vienna. A set of the Four Seasons was engraved by T. Major, and others by François Vivares, J. Wagner, C. G. Geyser, and others, including two pictures engraved in the Galerie Lebrun. Ferg also executed some etchings, mostly landscapes of a small size with figures and ruins; also a larger plate of Boors Carousing, in the style of Ostade. These are among works from the Sheepshanks collection now in the British Museum. A portrait of him was engraved by J. F. Bause. John Thomas Smith and some later sources refer to Ferg working as a decorator at the Chelsea porcelain factory: this cannot however be true, as it was not in production until after his death.

== Sources ==
Attribution

This article incorporates text from a publication now in the public domain: Cust, Lionel Henry (1889). "Ferg, Francis Paul". In Stephen, Leslie (ed.). Dictionary of National Biography. Vol. 18. London: Smith, Elder & Co. p. 334.

- Desenfans, Noel Joseph (1802). A descriptive catalogue: (with remarks and anecdotes never before published in English) of some pictures, of the different schools, purchased for His Majesty the late King of Poland (3rd ed.). London: Cadell & Davies. "Francis Paul Ferg,."
