= The Siege of Oxford =

Painting by Jan Wyck

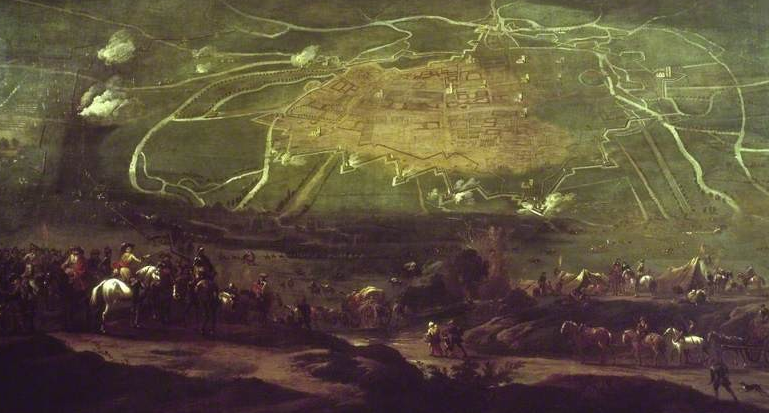
- Artist: Jan Wyck
- Year: 1689
- Type: Oil on canvas, history painting
- Dimensions: 172.8 cm × 238.8 cm (68.0 in × 94.0 in)
- Location: Museum of Oxford; Oxford

The Siege of Oxford is a 1689 oil painting by the Dutch artist Jan Wyck. It depicts the siege of Oxford in 1646 during the First English Civil War. Oxford had functioned as the Royalist capital throughout the war as London was in Parliamentary hands. Following the Battle of Naseby a more concerted attack on Oxford was launched, with artillery batteries established on Headington Hill to bombard the town into submission. It provides an unusual, panoramic view of the many fortifications defending the city.

It is today in the Museum of Oxford.

== Bibliography ==
- Black, Jeremy. The Cambridge Illustrated Atlas of Warfare: Renaissance to Revolution, 1492-1792. Cambridge University Press, 28 Mar 1996
- Bull, Stephen. 'The Furie of the Ordnance': Artillery in the English Civil Wars. Boydell & Brewer, 2008.
- Callow, James. James II: The Triumph and the Tragedy. A&C Black, 2005.
