= Jan Wyck =

Dutch painter (1645–1702)

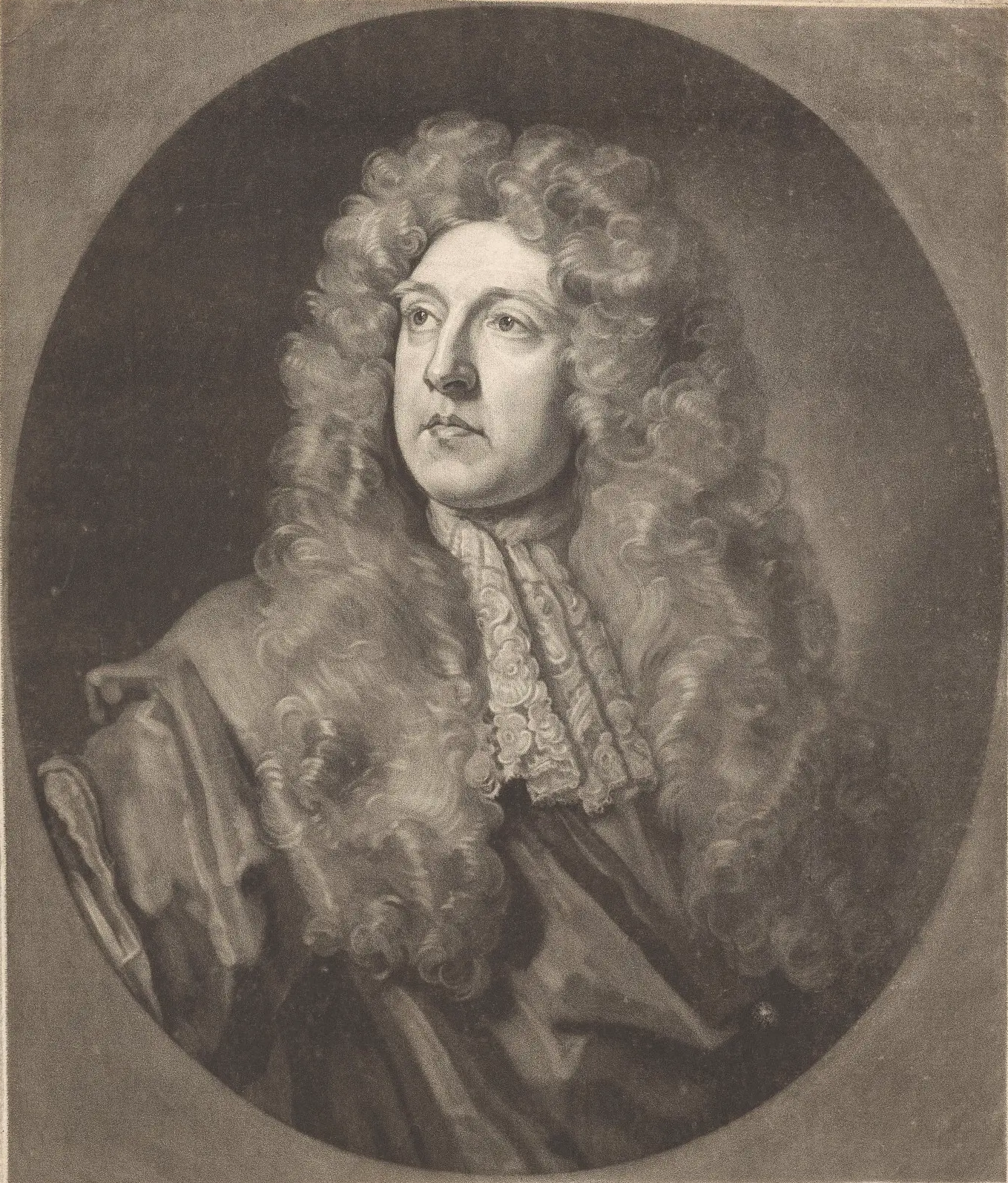
- Portrait by John Faber the Younger after Godfrey Kneller, 1730.
- Born: 29 October 1645; Haarlem, Dutch Republic
- Died: 17 May 1702 (aged 56); Mortlake, England
- Known for: Battle of the Boyne
- Spouses: Ann Skinner (m. 1657–1687) Elizabeth Holomberg (m. 1666–1693)
- Children: 4 unknown to Anne; John (b.1689); William (b.1691); Elizabeth (b.1693)

Jan Wyck (29 October 1645 – 17 May 1702), also known as Jan Wiyck or Jan Wick, was a Dutch Baroque painter, best known for his works on military subjects. There are over 150 of his works known to be in existence.

In an era when French artists dominated the genre, the arrival of Wyck and other Dutch and Flemish artists in Great Britain from 1660 onwards provided the catalyst for the development of military and naval art in Britain. Like other painters from the Low Countries such as Dirk Maas, Peter Tillemans and William van de Velde, Wyck moved to England and worked there throughout his life, often under royal patronage, producing many fine works of battle paintings, portraits, hunting scenes and landscapes as well as advancing the development of British art through teaching.

== Early life ==
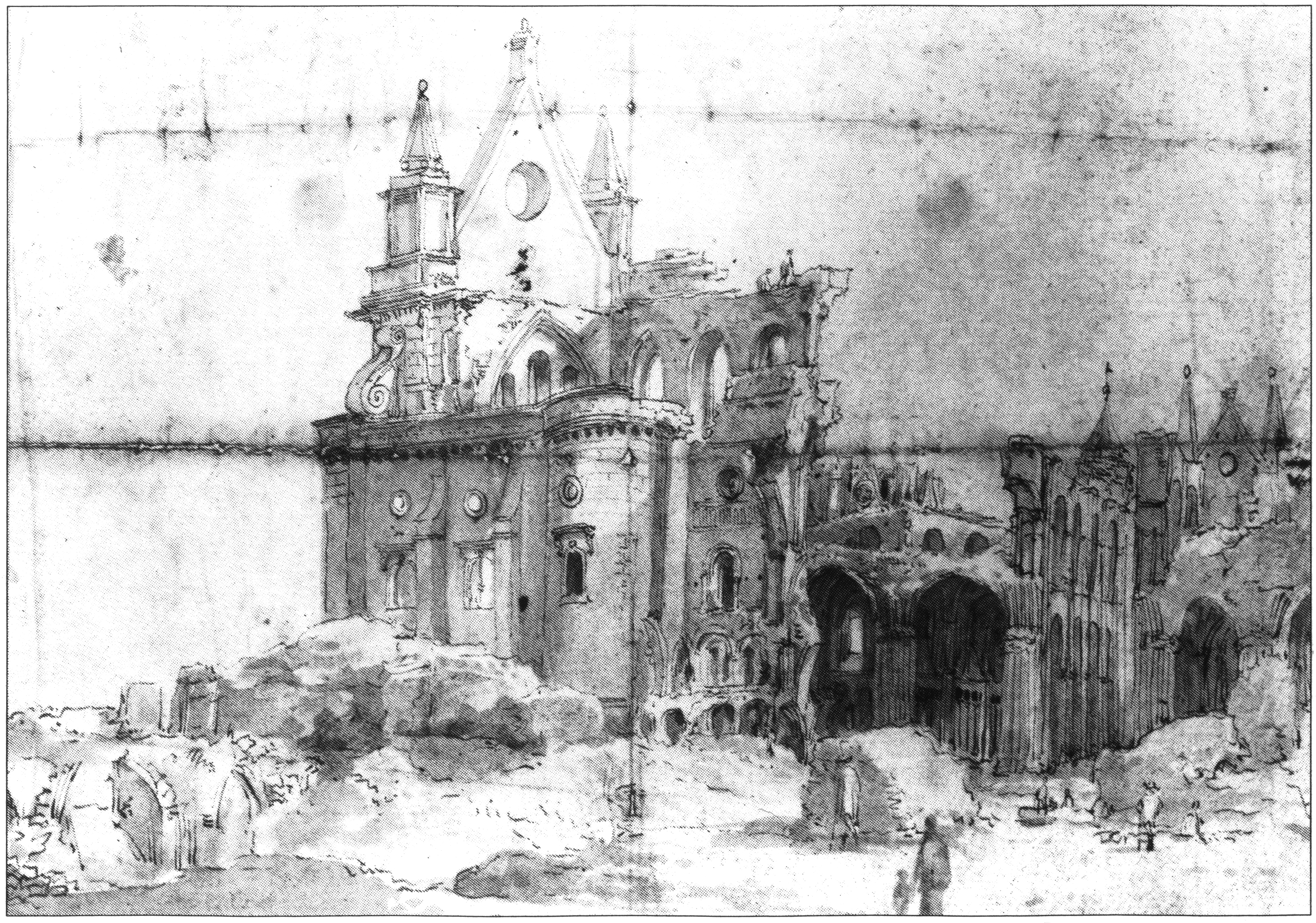
A sketch of the Old St Paul's Cathedral done by Jan's father Thomas Wyck in 1673.

Jan Wyck was born on 29 October 1652, in Haarlem, then part of the Dutch Republic. The son of Thomas Wyck (1616-1677), also a Dutch painter, it is assumed that his father taught him to paint, although little is actually known of his early life. His father had spent much of the 1630s in Rome, refining an Italianate style, which can be seen in the works of both father and son. It appears likely that at a fairly young age he and his father moved to England during the reign of Charles II of England, possibly in 1664. It also seems likely that they were in London at the time of the Great Fire of London, as his father created one of the last sketches of Old St Paul's Cathedral in its ruined state before it was knocked down to create the new St Paul's Cathedral, as well as night scenes of the fire itself.

The first documented reference to Jan Wyck comes from the sessions of the London court of the Painter-Stainers' Company where, on 17 June 1674, he is recorded as promising to pay both his own and his father's quarterly fees. At this hearing he also promised to soon deliver his 'proofe piece'. However his father had returned to Haarlem within a year, and died less than two and a half years later on 19 August 1677.

Although the details of his first marriage are unknown, Jan Wyck was married for a second time on 22 November 1676 with his certificate stating: 'Jan Wick of St Paul's Covent Garden, gent., widower, about 31 ...'. The reference to him being a widower at the age of 24 indicates he was first married at a young age. His second wife was a 19-year-old English woman called Anne Skinner of St Martin-in-the-fields. They had four children between 1678 and 1683, but none of them survived their early childhood.

Following the death of Anne in 1687, he remarried for the third time to a Dutch woman by the name of Elizabeth Holomberg in 1688. They moved into a new home in Mortlake, and between 1689 and 1693 they had two sons (John, b.1689 and William, b.1691) and a daughter (Elizabeth, b. 1693) together. His wife Elizabeth died giving birth to their daughter.

== Art career ==
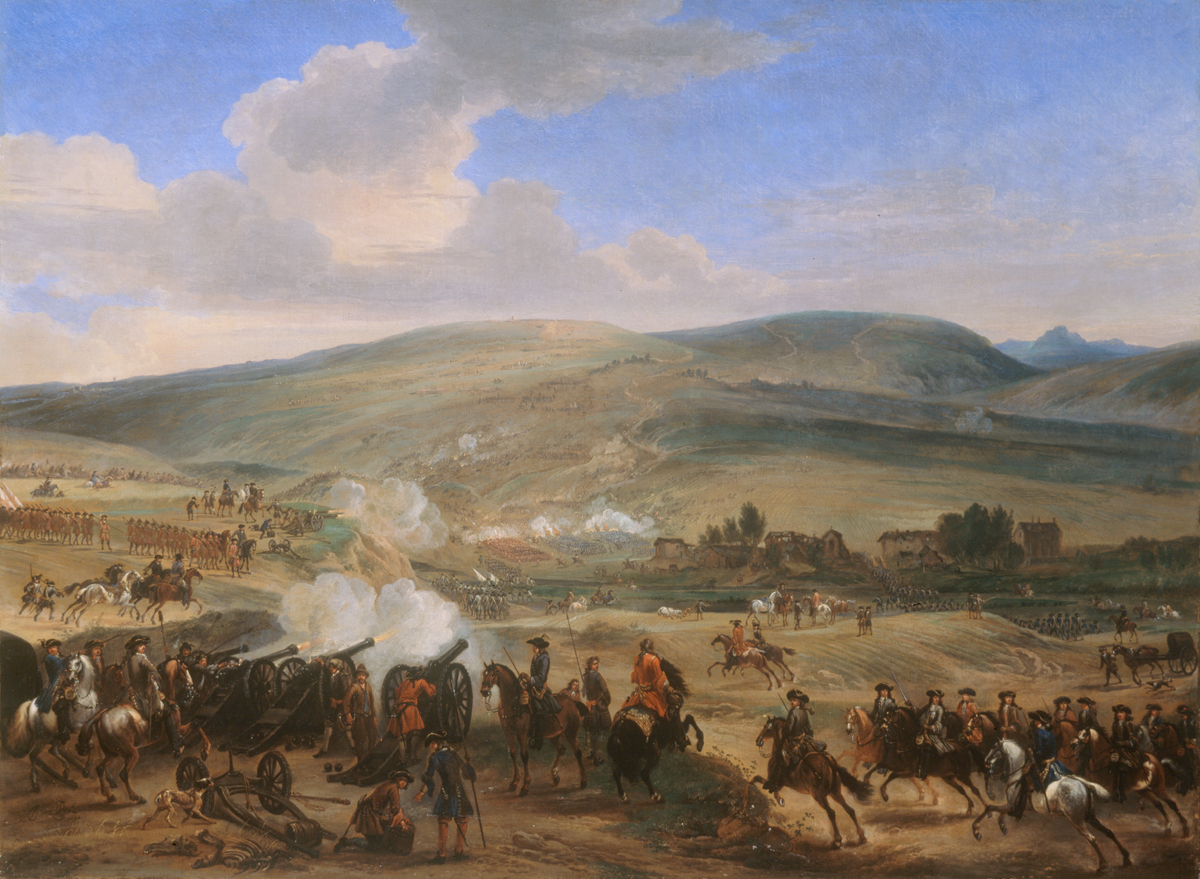
The Battle of the Boyne, by Jan Wyck, c.1693.

As the son of a fairly successful artist, it is likely Wyck was painting and drawing from a young age. Enjoying the patronage of the Duke of Ormond Wyck was known as the best landscape painter in London by 1686. By the time William III of England ascended to the throne, Wyck was also enjoying the patronage of the Duke of Monmouth. He painted a portrait of Monmouth on horseback in the 1670s, as well as many depictions of him in battle, such as at the Siege of Maastricht in 1673, and at the Battle of Bothwell Bridge in 1679.

Wyck was placed upon the committee of Acting Painters of the Painter-Stainers' Company on 24 November 1680, which was a recognition of his rising talent. He first made a public name for himself when he accompanied fellow Dutch painter Dirk Maas to Ireland to paint the campaigns of William III. Maas had received a commission from King William to paint the Battle of the Boyne, and, although it is not known if he was also present at the battle, Wyck also painted many scenes from the battle. Throughout the 1690s, he is known to have created at least half a dozen oils of the battle, as well as countless battle pieces, encampments and equestrian portraits of soldiers before battle.

William was impressed with his work, and commissioned him to paint himself, which he did many times, often in equestrian poses. William had soon also called upon Wyck to depict countless scenes of his campaigns throughout the Low Countries during the Nine Years' War (also known as King William's War), including the Siege of Namur, and the Siege of Naarden.

Other scenes he painted include the Siege of Derry (1689), and the horse and battle portion of Godfrey Kneller's famous portrait of the Duke of Schomberg, who had been killed at the Battle of the Boyne.

Wyck's works are notable for their flair and colour, as well as the excellent attention to detail. He highlights features such as flourishing sabres, firing muskets, flaring horses nostrils and cannons spouting flames. But most importantly he brought the viewer into the battle at a time when the prevailing trend was to present birds-eye views over a battle, showing disposition and locations of troop formations. He personalised the soldiers, and created an atmospheric presentation of the scenes depicted. He also celebrated notable commanders and recognisable figures within his works, a feature that made him popular with those commissioning works.

== Later life ==
Jan Wyck began to school young British artists whilst continuing to work on his own projects, and became highly influential in the development of British art in the period, particularly in the genre of battle painting. One of his principal students that went on to produce great works of national importance was John Wootton, who exemplified British equestrian and military art in the early eighteenth century. Another student was the amateur painter Sir Martin Beckman and Matthias Read. Read moved to Whitehaven and became known as the "Father of Cumbrian Painting".

Jan Wyck died at his family home in Mortlake, Surrey, on 17 May 1702, aged 56.

== Known works ==
- Lieutenant and Lieutenant-Colonel Randolph Egerton MP (d. 1681), the King’s Troop of Horse Guards, c1672 (in the collection of the National Army Museum, London)
- James Scott, Duke of Monmouth and Buccleuch, 1675 (in the collection of the National Portrait Gallery (London))
- William III leading his troops at the Battle of Namur, 1690s? (in private ownership; sold at Christie's auction in 2008 for €6,250 ($8,020))
- William III Landing at Brixham, Torbay, 5 November 1688, 1688, (in the collection of the National Maritime Museum, London)
- King William III, 1688 (in the Government Art Collection)
- King William III on horseback, 1690 (in the Government Art Collection)
- A cavalry skirmish, 1680s?, (in the collection of the Courtauld Institute, London)
- Cavalry Battle, 1680s?, (in the collection of the Courtauld Institute, London)
- A river landscape with travelers bathing, by a village
- A battle scene
- A prospect of Whitehaven, 1686 (in the collection of Lord Cavendish, Holker Hall)
- The Battle of the Boyne, 1690 (in the collection of the National Army Museum, London)
- King William III and his army at the Siege of Namur, 1695 (in the collection of the National Army Museum, London)
- The battle of the Boyne, prior to the death of the Duke of Schomberg before William III, 1690 (in private ownership; sold at Whyte's auction in 2008 for an undisclosed amount)
- Stag hunting beside a river, 1690s, (unsold at Christie's auction in 2008)
- A race meeting on Newmarket Heath, unknown, (in private ownership; sold at Sotheby's auction in 2002 for an undisclosed amount)
- A huntsman with a hare and hounds above Berkhamsted, Hertfordshire, signed; sold Sotheby's 1986.
- Hunting party, said to be the Duc de Chartres in an extensive landscape, unknown (in private ownership; sold at Sotheby's auction in 1994 for an undisclosed amount)
- An elegant hunting party resting under a tree, a river and a village beyond
- An Extensive Landscape with an Army Fording a River, Said to be Louis XIV Crossing the Rhine, 1692 (in the Royal Collection)
- A Cavalry Battle In a Valley Beneath a Fortified City
- Horse Guards Parade, 1690s, (in the private collection of Ackermann and Johnson Ltd)
- Italianate Landscape with Town and Waterfall, 1680s? (in the collection of Tate Gallery, London)
- A Fortified Village in a Rocky Landscape, 1680s? (in the collection of Tate Gallery, London)
- A Rocky Landscape with Bridge and Cottage, 1680s? (in the collection of Tate Gallery, London)
- Defeat of the Moors by the British Garrison of Tangier, 27 October 1680, 1680s? (in the collection of National Museums Scotland, Edinburgh)

== Gallery ==
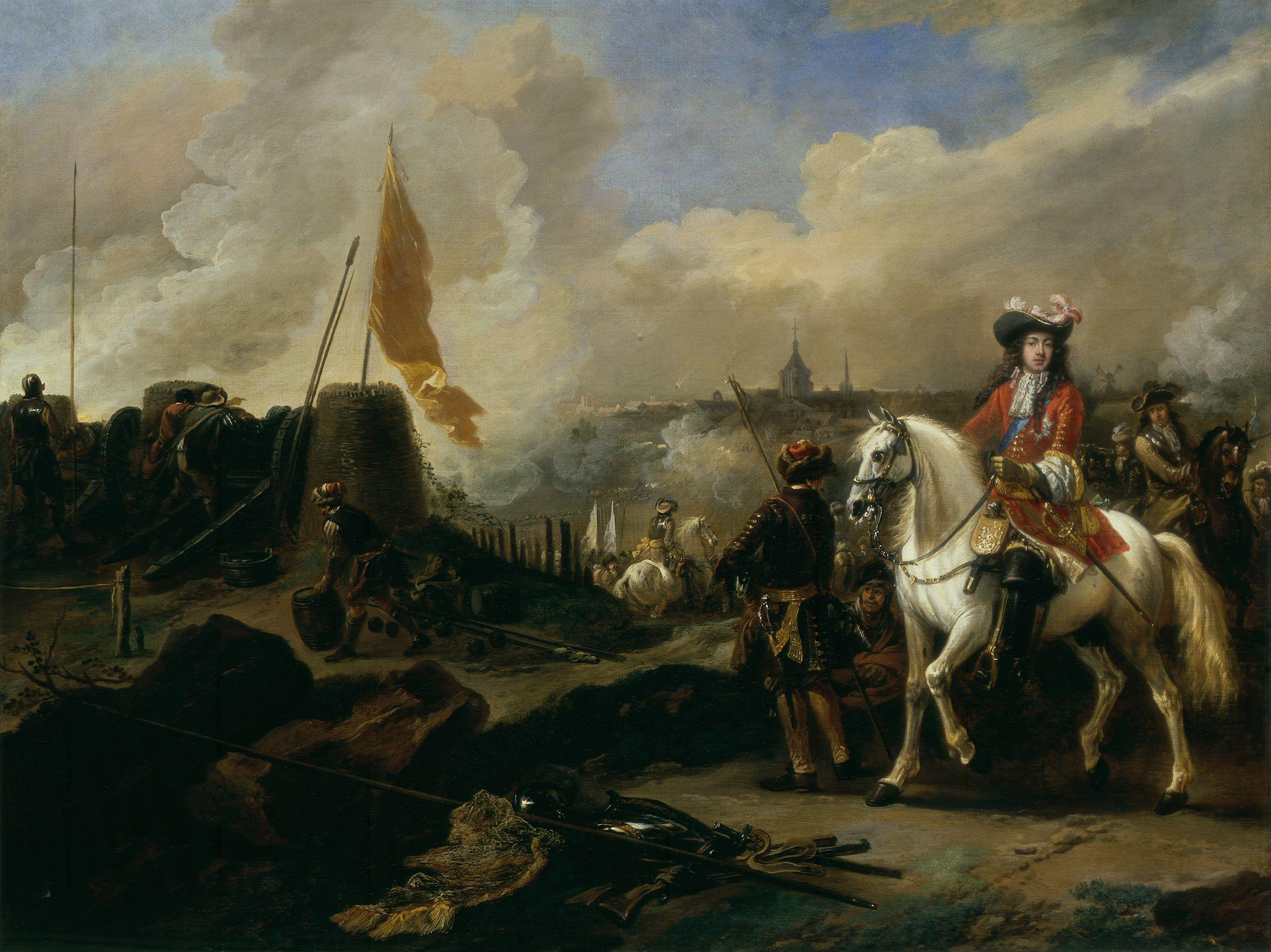
The Duke of Monmouth at the Siege of Maastricht, 1675

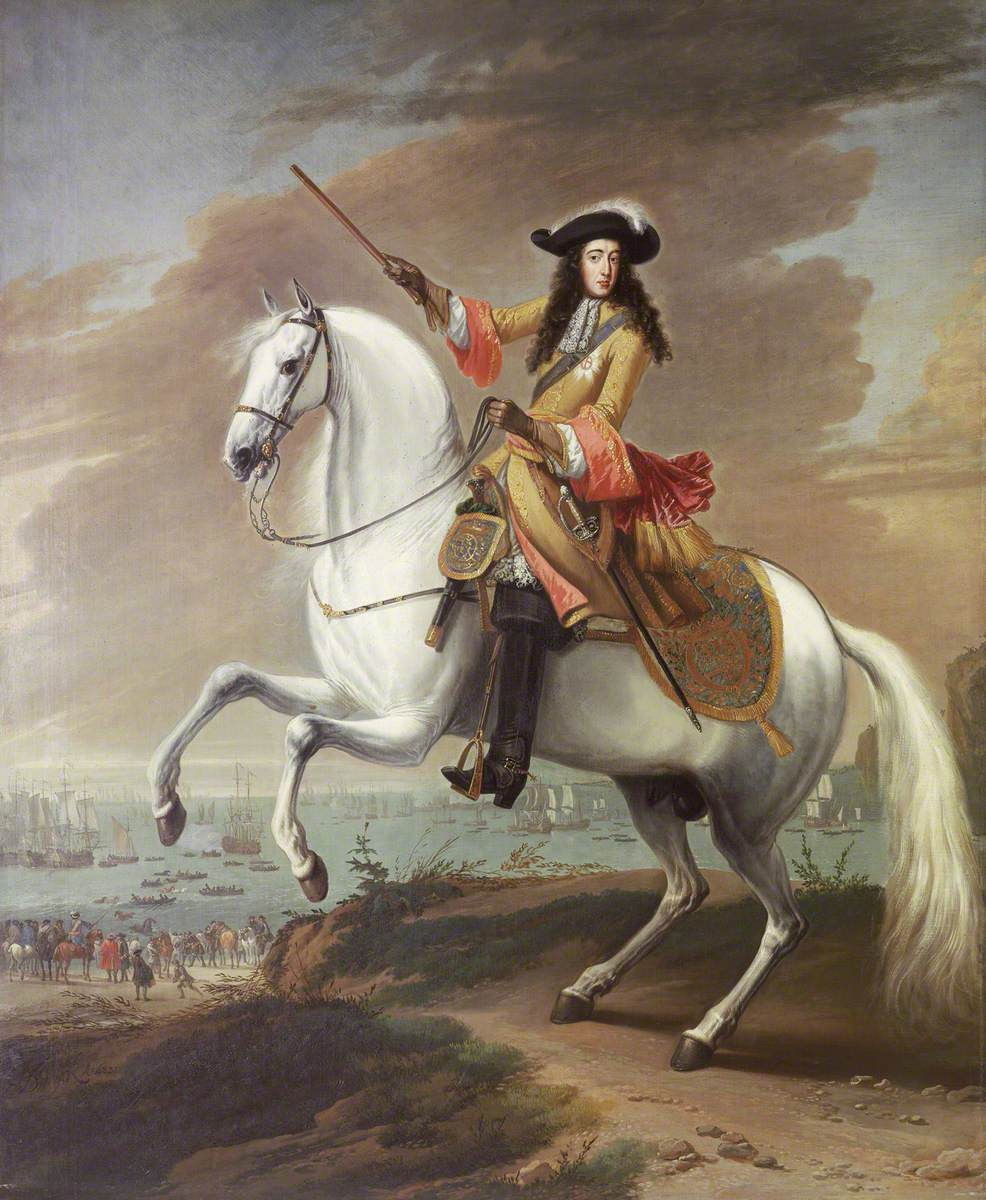
William III Landing at Brixham, 1688

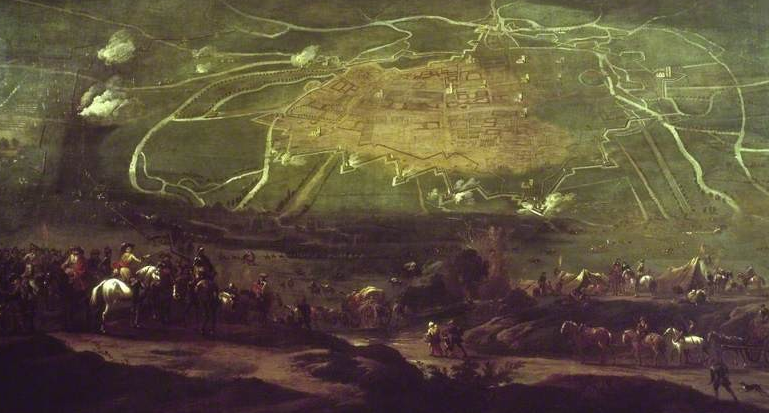
The Siege of Oxford, 1689
