= 1680 in art =

Events from the year 1680 in art.

== Events ==
- Following the death of Sir Peter Lely, Godfrey Kneller is appointed Principal Painter to the Crown by King Charles II of England.

== Paintings ==
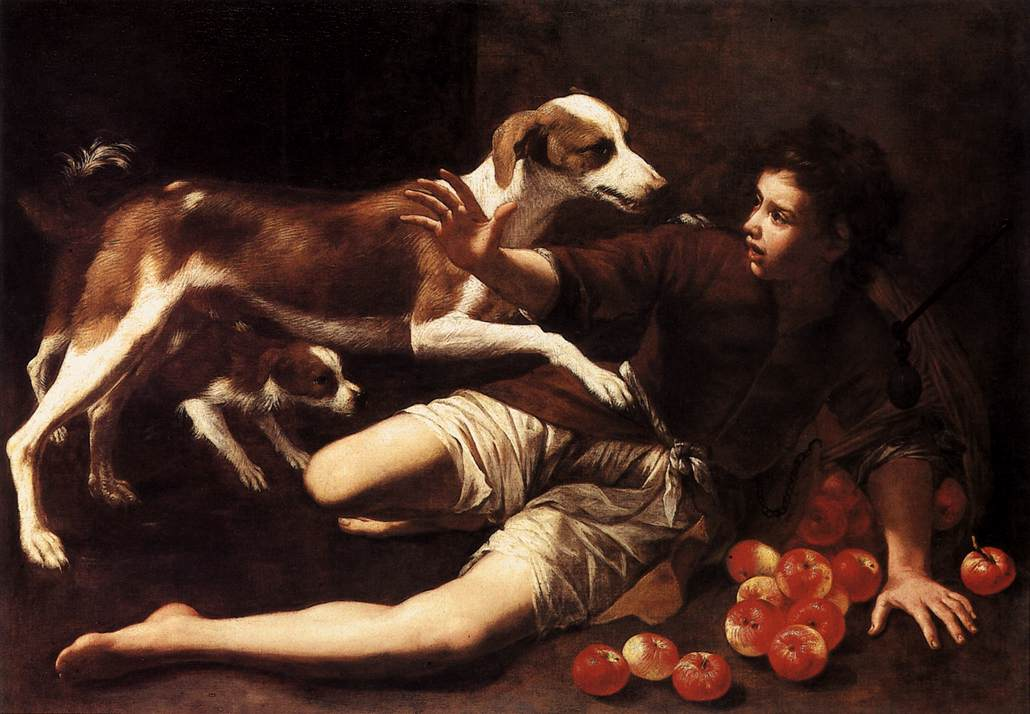
De Villavicencio – Fallen Apple Basket

- Pedro Nuñez de Villavicencio - Fallen Apple Basket (Museum of Fine Arts (Budapest))
- Godfrey Kneller - Black Page Boy (Charlecote Park, England)
- Gerard ter Borch - Young Man Reading a Book (approximate date)
- John Michael Wright – Portrait of Sir Neil O'Neill

== Births ==
- January 3 - Johann Baptist Zimmermann, German painter and stucco plasterer (died 1758)
- March 23 - Juan Ramírez Mejandre, Spanish Baroque sculptor (died 1739)
- date unknown
  - Juan Antonio García de Bouzas, Spanish painter of the Baroque period (died 1755)
  - Francisco Bustamante, Spanish painter (died 1737)
  - Leonardo Coccorante, Italian painter especially of large, highly detailed landscapes with imaginary classical architectural ruins (died 1750)
  - Lorenzo De Ferrari, Italian painter (died 1744)
  - Giuseppe Gambarini, Italian painter of frescoes (died 1725)
  - Carlo Antonio Rambaldi, Italian painter of the Baroque period (died 1717)
  - Girolamo Rossi, Italian engraver of the late-Baroque (d. unknown)
  - Carlo Salis, Italian painter, born in Verona (died 1763)
  - Pier Lorenzo Spoleti, Italian painter of portrait painting and reproductions of master paintings (died 1726)
  - Maria Verelst, Dutch miniature and portrait painter (died 1744)
  - Candido Vitali, Italian painter of still lifes of animals, birds, flower, and fruit (died 1753)
- probable
  - Maurice Baquoy, French engraver (died 1747)
  - Francesco Boccaccino, Italian painter, born at Cremona (died 1750)
  - Domenico Bocciardo, Italian painter, active in Genoa (died 1746)
  - Charles Collins, Irish painter primarily of animals and still-life (died 1744)
  - Sebastiano Conca, Italian painter (died 1764)
  - Jean-Baptiste Gilles, French painter of portraits in miniature and water-colours (died 1762)
  - Gaetano Martoriello, Italian painter of marine vedute and landscapes (died 1733)

== Deaths ==
- February – Willem Drost, Netherlands painter (born 1630)
- August 24 – Ferdinand Bol, Dutch artist, etcher, and draftsman (born 1616)
- October 4 – Jacobus Mancadan, Dutch Golden Age painter mostly known for his pastoral landscapes (born 1602)
- November 28
  - Gian Lorenzo Bernini, Italian sculptor/architect/painter (born 1598)
  - Giovanni Francesco Grimaldi, Italian architect and painter (born 1606)
- November 30 – Sir Peter Lely, English painter (born 1618)
- date unknown
  - Juan de Alfaro y Gamez, Spanish painter of the Baroque (born 1643)
  - Nicolas Baudesson, French flower painter (born 1611)
  - Girolamo Bonini, Italian painter, active mainly in Bologna (born unknown)
  - Hendrick Danckerts, Dutch painter and engraver (born 1625)
  - Angelo Everardi, Italian painter of battle scenes (born 1647)
  - Adriano Palladino, Italian painter born and active in Cortona (born 1610)
  - Francesco Quaini, Italian painter of quadratura (born 1611)
  - Luigi Pellegrini Scaramuccia, Italian painter and artist biographer (born 1616)
  - Wang Shimin – Chinese landscape painter during the Qing dynasty (born 1592)
- probable
  - Willem Claeszoon Heda, Dutch still life painter (born 1594)
  - Giovanni Fulco, Italian painter excelling particularly in the representation of children (born 1615)
