= 1753 in art =

List of years in art	(table)
- … 1743; 1744; 1745; 1746; 1747; 1748; 1749; 1750; 1751; 1752; 1753; 1754; 1755; 1756; 1757; 1758; 1759; 1760; 1761; 1762; 1763 …
- Art; Archaeology; Architecture; Literature; Music; Philosophy; Science; +...

Events from the year 1753 in art.

== Events ==
- Jean-Baptiste Perronneau becomes a member of the Académie Royale de Peinture et de Sculpture.

== Paintings ==
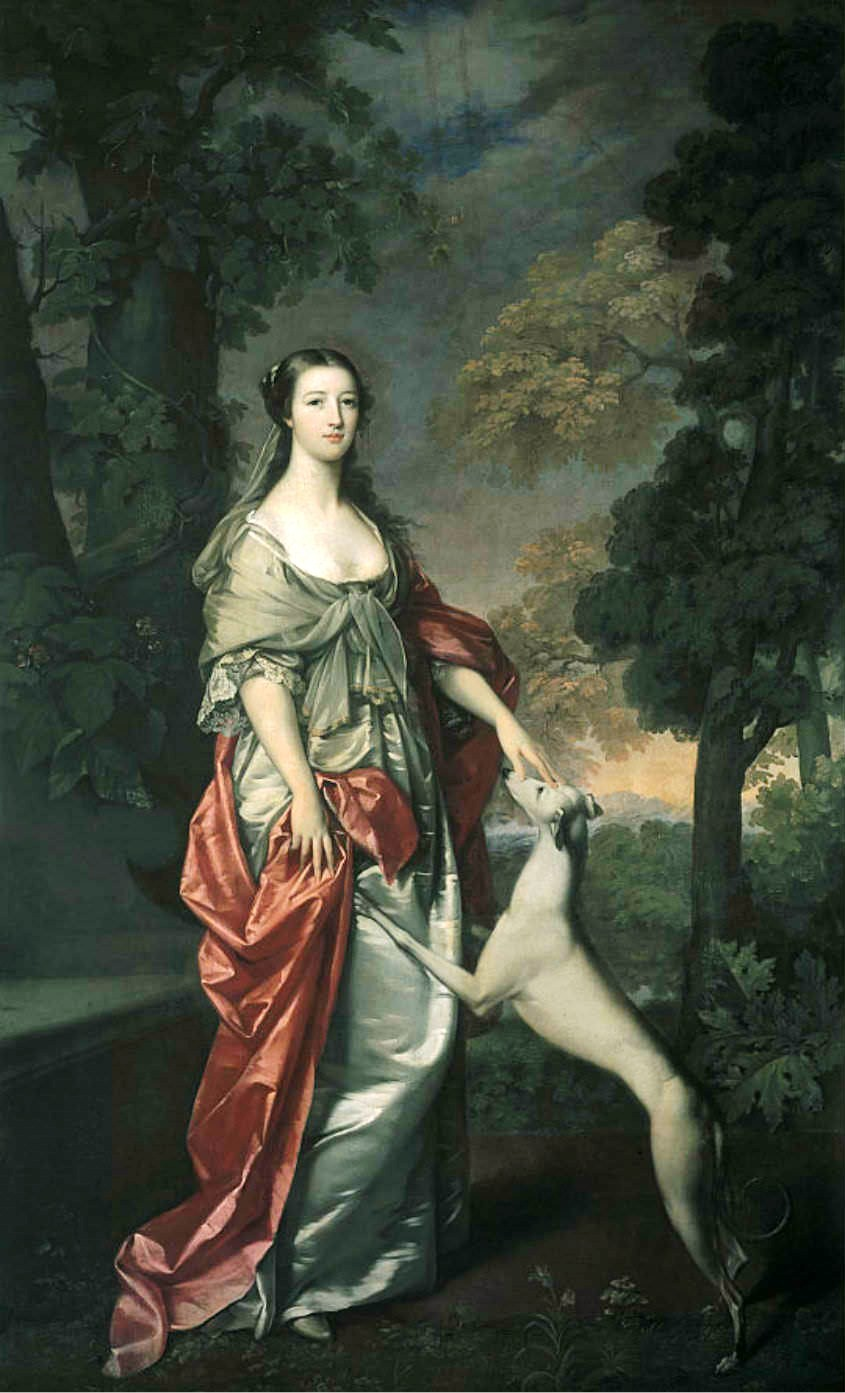
Gavin Hamilton – Elizabeth Gunning

- John Giles Eccardt – Richard Bentley
- Jean-Honoré Fragonard – Psyche Showing Her Sisters Her Gifts from Cupid
- Thomas Gainsborough
  - Couple in a Landscape
  - Portrait of Edward Vernon
- Gavin Hamilton – Portrait of Elizabeth Gunning, Duchess of Hamilton, commissioned by James Hamilton, 6th Duke of Hamilton (c. 1752-1753)
- Gustaf Lundberg – Portrait of Carl Linnaeus (Linné)
- Jean-Baptiste Oudry – The White Duck
- Joshua Reynolds – Captain the Honourable Augustus Keppel (National Maritime Museum, Greenwich)
- Johann Heinrich Tischbein – Self-Portrait in Venetian Masquerade Costume
- Marcos Zapata – The Last Supper (Cathedral of Santo Domingo, Cusco)

== Births ==
- February 2 – Giacomo Raffaelli, Italian mosaicist from Rome (died 1836)
- February 24 – Henri-Pierre Danloux, French painter (died 1809)
- April 15 – Robert Smirke, English painter (died 1845)
- May 1 – Joseph Bergler the Younger, painter and etcher (died 1829)
- May 12 – Agustín Esteve, Spanish portraitist and court painter to the Spanish Crown (died 1830)
- August 12 – Thomas Bewick, English wood engraver (died 1828)
- September 10 – Sir John Soane, British architect (died 1837)
- October 12 – Lié Louis Périn-Salbreux, painter, pastellist and miniaturist (died 1817)
- November – Sir Francis Bourgeois, court painter to King George III (died 1811)
- November 6 – Mikhail Kozlovsky, Russian Neoclassical sculptor active during the Age of Enlightenment (died 1802)
- November 14 – Francis Nicholson, landscape painter (died 1844)
- December 12 – Sir William Beechey, portrait painter (died 1839)
- date unknown
  - Joseph Barney, English painter (died 1832)
  - Pierre Chasselat, French miniature painter (died 1814)
  - Francisco Agustín y Grande, Spanish painter of the Neoclassic style (died 1800)
- probable
  - Fyodor Alekseyev, Russian painter of landscape art (died 1824)
  - Utamaro, Japanese printmaker and painter, especially of woodblock prints (ukiyo-e) (died 1806)

== Deaths ==
- January 9 – Lars Gallenius, Finnish painter (born 1658)
- July 8 – Federiko Benković, Croatian painter (born 1667)
- August 5 – Johann Gottfried Auerbach, Austrian painter (born 1697)
- September 16 – Georg Wenzeslaus von Knobelsdorff, painter and architect in Prussia (born 1699)
- September 18 – Hristofor Zhefarovich is best remembered as a painter, engraver and writer working in Belgrade (born 1699)
- November – Giuseppe Valentini, Italian violinist, painter, poet and composer (born 1681)
- December 15 – Richard Boyle, 3rd Earl of Burlington, English architect (born 1694)
- December 18 – Miyagawa Chōshun, Japanese painter in the ukiyo-e style (born 1683)
- date unknown
  - Gao Xiang, Qing Chinese painter, and one of the Eight Eccentrics of Yangzhou (born 1688)
  - André Jean, French artist (born 1662)
  - Francesco Polazzo, Italian painter of portraits and historical subjects (born 1683)
  - Miguel Posadas, Spanish painter (born 1711)
  - Candido Vitali, Italian painter of still life of animals, birds, flower, and fruit (born 1680)
- probable – Angelo Trevisani, Italian painter, active mainly in Venice (born 1669)
