= 1658 in art =

Events from the year 1658 in art.

== Events ==
- (unknown)

== Paintings ==
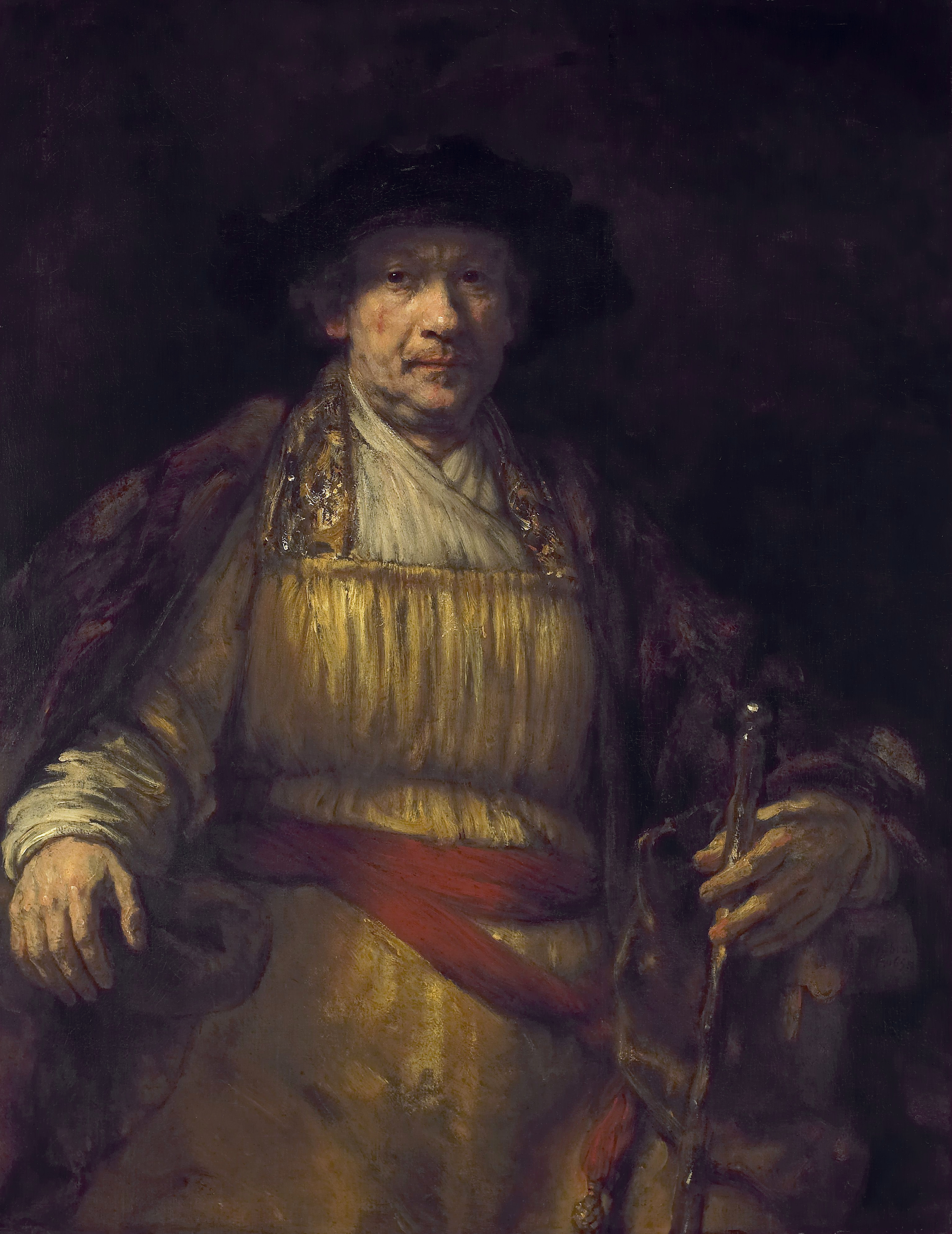
Rembrandt – Self-portrait

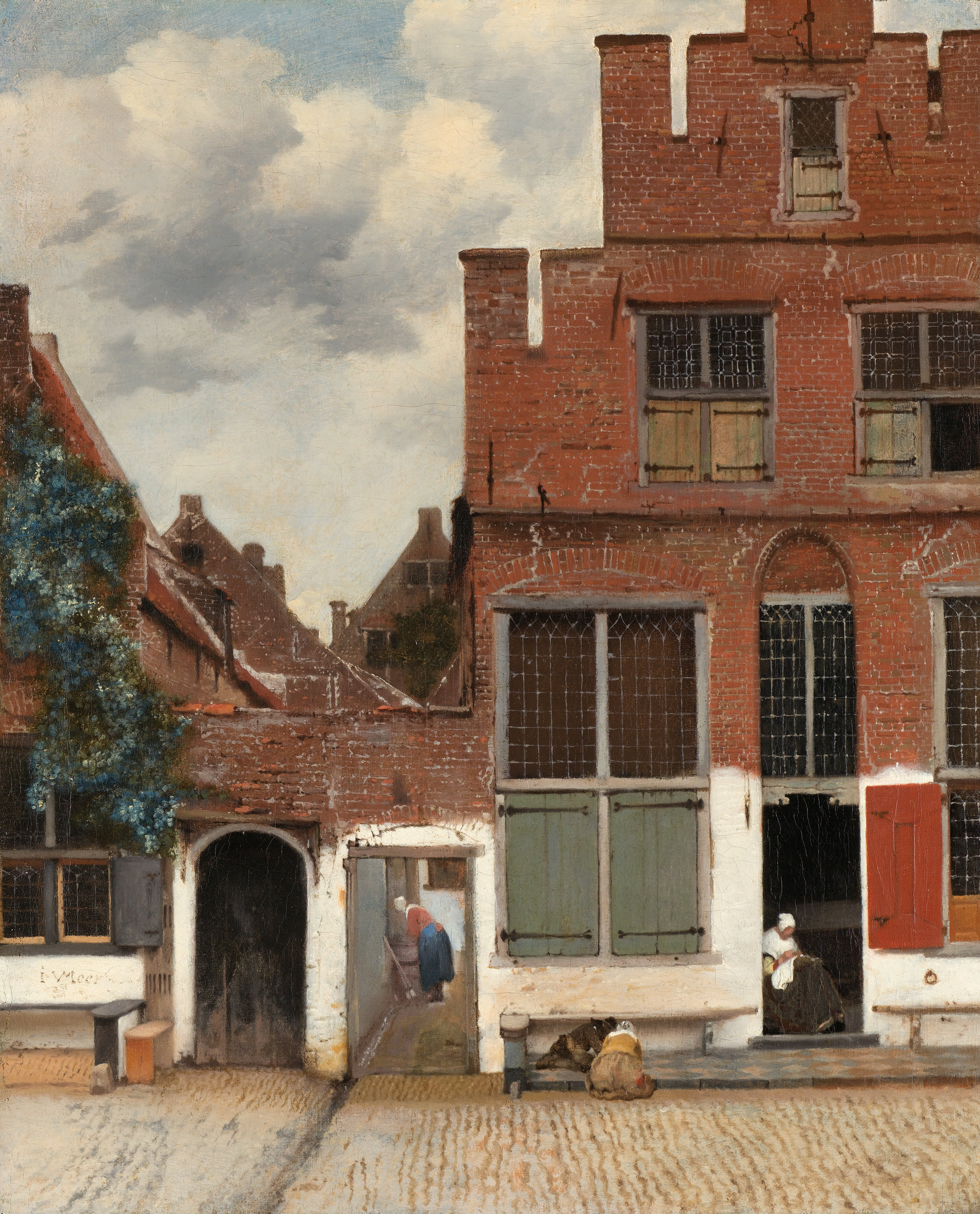
Vermeer – The Little Street

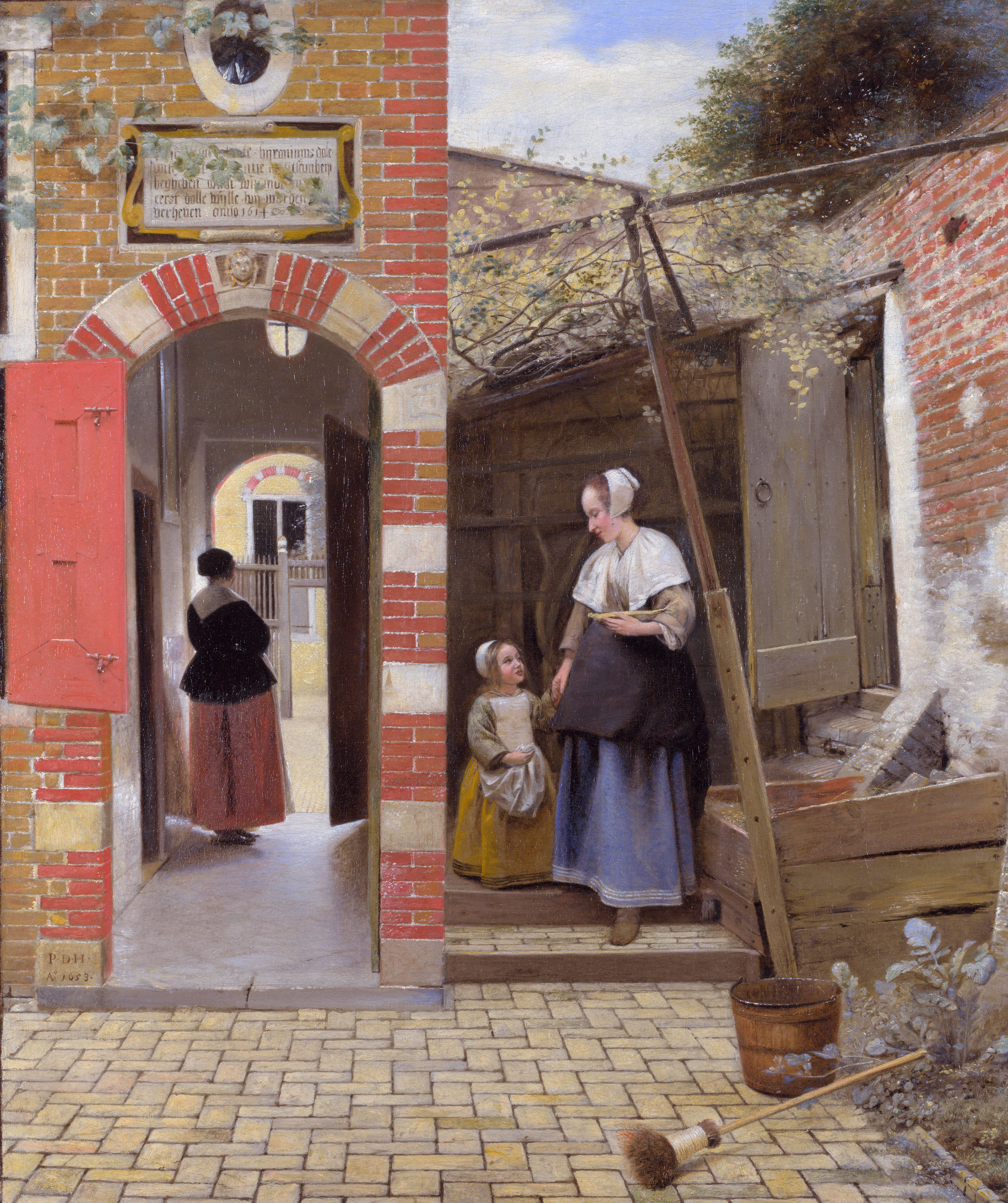
de Hooch – The Courtyard of a House in Delft

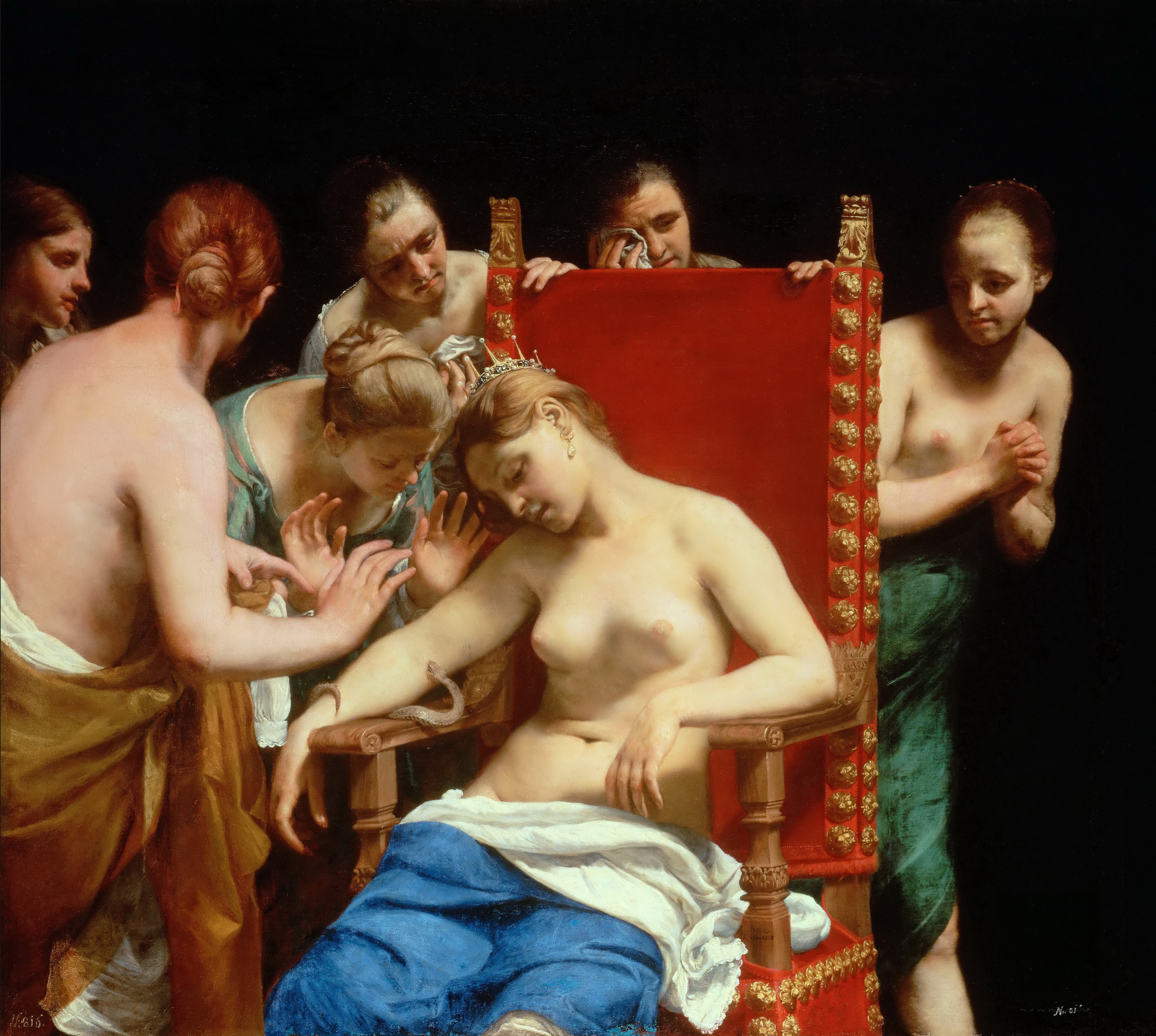
Cagnacci – Death of Cleopatra
- Guido Cagnacci – Death of Cleopatra
- Pieter de Hooch
  - The Courtyard of a House in Delft (National Gallery, London)
  - Woman Drinking with Soldiers (The Louvre)
  - A Woman drinking with Two Men, and a Maidservant (National Gallery, London)
- Elisabetta Sirani – Baptism of Christ
- Rembrandt – Self-portrait
- Simon Ushakov
  - Great Hierarch
  - Saviour Acheiropoieta (date doubtful)
- Wallerant Vaillant – Trompe-l'œil letter rack
- Adriaen van der Spelt and Frans van Mieris – Flower Piece with Curtain (The Art Institute of Chicago)
- Jan Vermeer
  - The Little Street
  - The Milkmaid

== Births ==
- January 9 - Nicolas Coustou, French sculptor (died 1733)
- March 23 - Jean-Baptiste Santerre, French painter (died 1717)
- June 11 - Victor Honoré Janssens, Flemish painter (died 1736)
- July 14 - Camillo Rusconi, Italian sculptor (died 1728)
- August 25 – Claude Audran III, French painter (died 1734)
- date unknown
  - Christian Berentz, German artist (died 1722)
  - Carlo Antonio Bussi, Swiss painter (died 1690)
  - Antonio Calza, Italian painter of historical and battle-scenes (died 1725)
  - Giovanni Agostino Cassana, Italian painter of animals and subject pictures (died 1720)
  - Lars Gallenius, Finnish painter (died 1753)
  - Ogata Kōrin, Japanese painter and lacquerer (died 1716)
  - Franz Werner von Tamm, German-born, Italian painter (died 1724)

== Deaths ==
- June 11 - Domenico Carpinoni, Italian painter of primarily religious works (born 1566)
- June 27 - Ercole Gennari, Italian Renaissance drawer and painter (born 1597)
- June 29 - Gerrit Reynst, Dutch merchant and art collector (born 1599; drowned)
- November - Pieter de Bloot, Dutch painter (born 1601)
- December 2 - Cornelis Holsteyn, Dutch painter of historical allegories, portraits, and interior decorations (born 1618)
- date unknown
  - Clemente Bocciardo, Italian painter (born 1620)
  - Francis Cleyn, German painter and tapestry designer (born 1582)
  - Carlo Ridolfi, Italian art biographer and painter (born 1594)
  - Pieter Anthonisz. van Groenewegen, Dutch painter and member of the Bentvueghels (born 1590-1600)
  - Cristóbal Vela, Spanish Baroque painter and gilder (born 1588)
  - Robert Walker, English portrait painter (born 1599)
  - Xiang Shengmo, Chinese painter of the Qing Dynasty (born 1597)
- probable - Giulio Quaglio the Elder, Italian painter of frescoes (born 1610)
