= 1755 in art =

Events from the year 1755 in art.

== Events ==
- Canaletto returns from England to Venice, where he continues painting until his death in 1768.
- 25 August – The Salon of 1755 opens at the Louvre in Paris

== Paintings ==
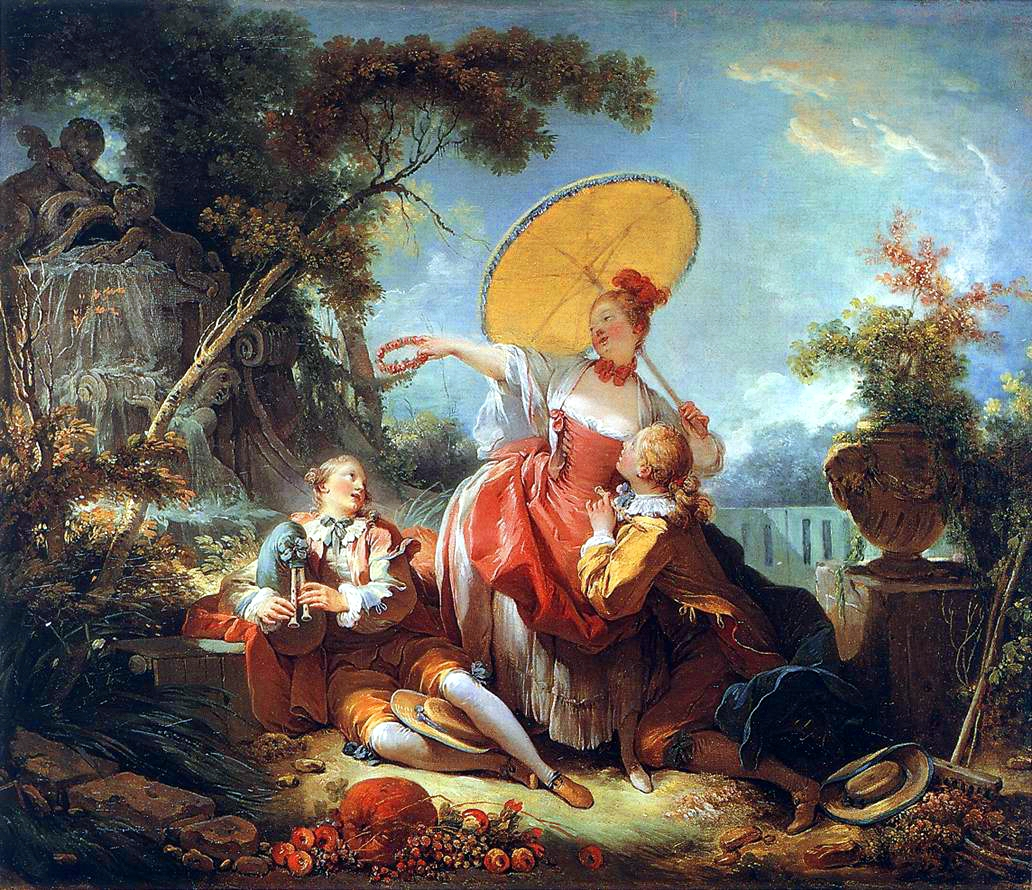
Fragonard, The Musical Contest

- François Boucher – Landscape with a Watermill
- Jean-Honoré Fragonard – The Musical Contest
- William Hogarth – Sealing the Tomb
- John Shackleton – George II (Scottish National Portrait Gallery, Edinburgh)

== Births ==
- January 30 - Richard Collins, English chief miniature and enamel painter to George III (died 1831)
- February - Albert Christoph Dies, German painter and composer (died 1822)
- February 6 – Henry Bone, English enamel painter (died 1834)
- February 13 - Philibert-Louis Debucourt, French painter and engraver (died 1832)
- April 9 - William Birch, English miniature painter and engraver (died 1834)
- April 16 – Élisabeth-Louise Vigée-Le Brun, French painter (died 1842)
- July 6 – John Flaxman, sculptor (died 1826)
- July 14 - Charles-Antoine Clevenbergh, Flemish painter of still-life (died 1810)
- August 4 – Nicolas-Jacques Conté, painter and inventor of the pencil (died 1805)
- August 17 – Thomas Stothard, English painter and engraver (died 1834)
- September 8 - Petrus Johannes van Regemorter, Flemish landscape and genre painter (died 1830)
- November 16 - Marie Jeanne Clemens, Danish engraver and painter, member of Danish Academy of Fine Arts (died 1791)
- December 3 – Gilbert Stuart, American painter (died 1828)
- December 4 – Franz Caucig, Slovene painter and drawer (died 1828)
- date unknown
  - Prince Hoare, English painter and dramatist (died 1834)
  - Philip Jean, English miniaturist painter (died 1802)
  - Luigi Mayer, Italian-German painter (died 1803)
  - Filippo Pennino, Italian sculptor (died 1801)

== Deaths ==
- March 6 – Pier Leone Ghezzi, Italian Rococo painter and caricaturist active in Rome (born 1674)
- April 30 – Jean-Baptiste Oudry, French Rococo painter, engraver and tapestry designer (born 1686)
- May 23 - Juan Antonio García de Bouzas, Spanish painter (born 1680)
- May 25 – Gustavus Hesselius, Swedish-American painter (born 1682)
- date unknown
  - Pietro Anderlini, Italian painter of the Rococo period (born 1687)
  - Li Fangying, Chinese painter from Jiangsu (born 1696)
  - Jean-Louis Lemoyne, French sculptor (born 1665)
  - Giovanni Agostino Ratti, Italian cabinet painter, engraver, and constructed scenography (born 1699)
  - Odoardo Vicinelli, Italian painter of the late-Baroque period (born 1684)
- probable (died 1755/1759) – Giuseppe Antonio Petrini, painter of Italian or Lombard heritage (born 1677)
