= Bocciardo =

Bocciardo is an Italian surname. Notable people with the surname include:

- Clemente Bocciardo (1620–1658), Italian painter
- Domenico Bocciardo (c. 1680–1746), Italian painter
- Francesco Bocciardo (born 1994), Italian Paralympic swimmer
