= Giacomo Raffaelli =

Giacomo Raffaelli may refer to:

- Giacomo Raffaelli (artist)
- Giacomo Raffaelli (volleyball)
