= Santa Croce in Fossabanda, Pisa =

Church and monastery in Pisa, Tuscany, Italy

Coordinates: 43.7116°N 10.4149°E

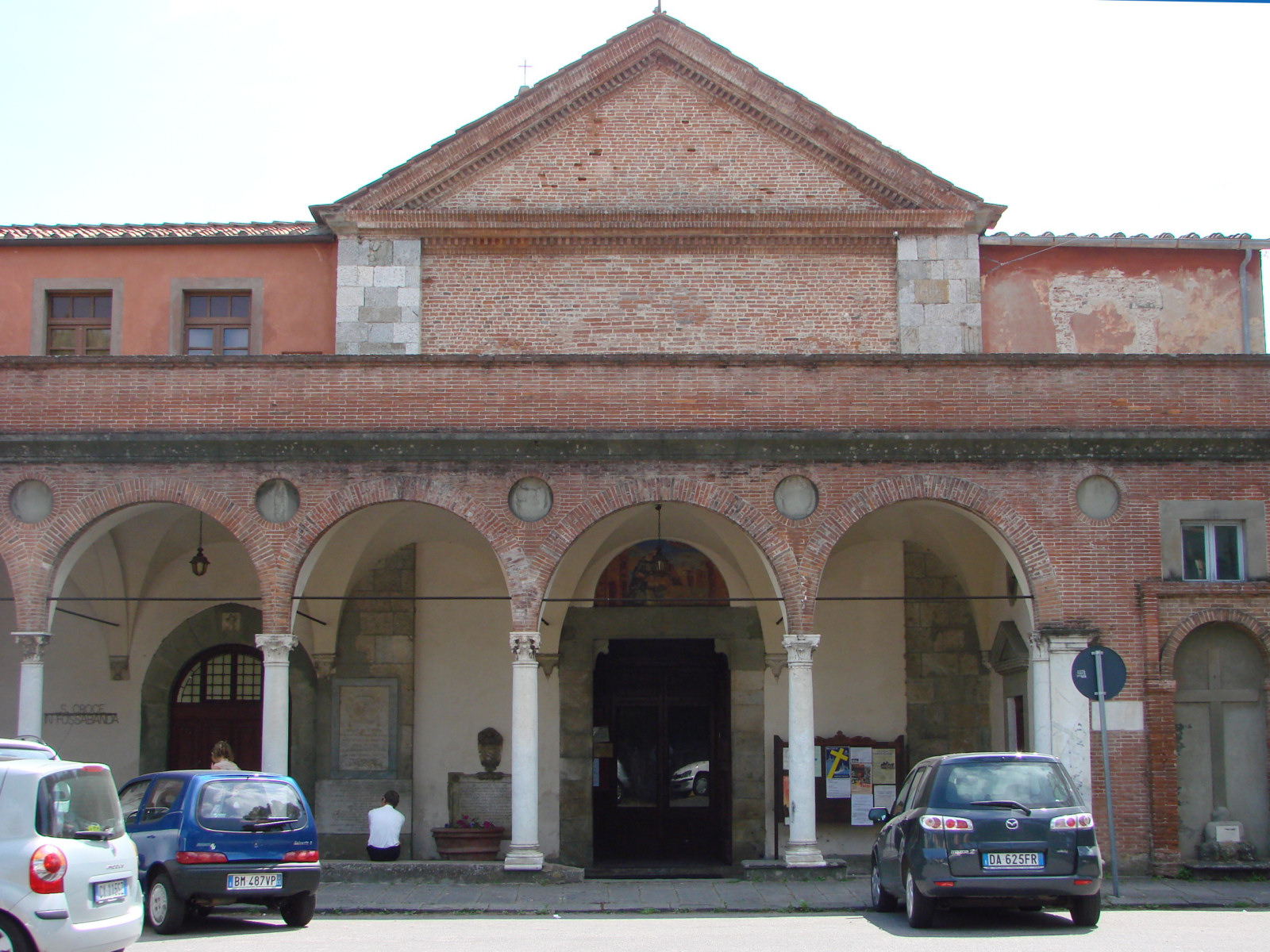
Santa Croce in Fossabanda

Santa Croce in Fossabanda is a Renaissance-style Roman Catholic church and monastery in Pisa, region of Tuscany, Italy.

== History ==
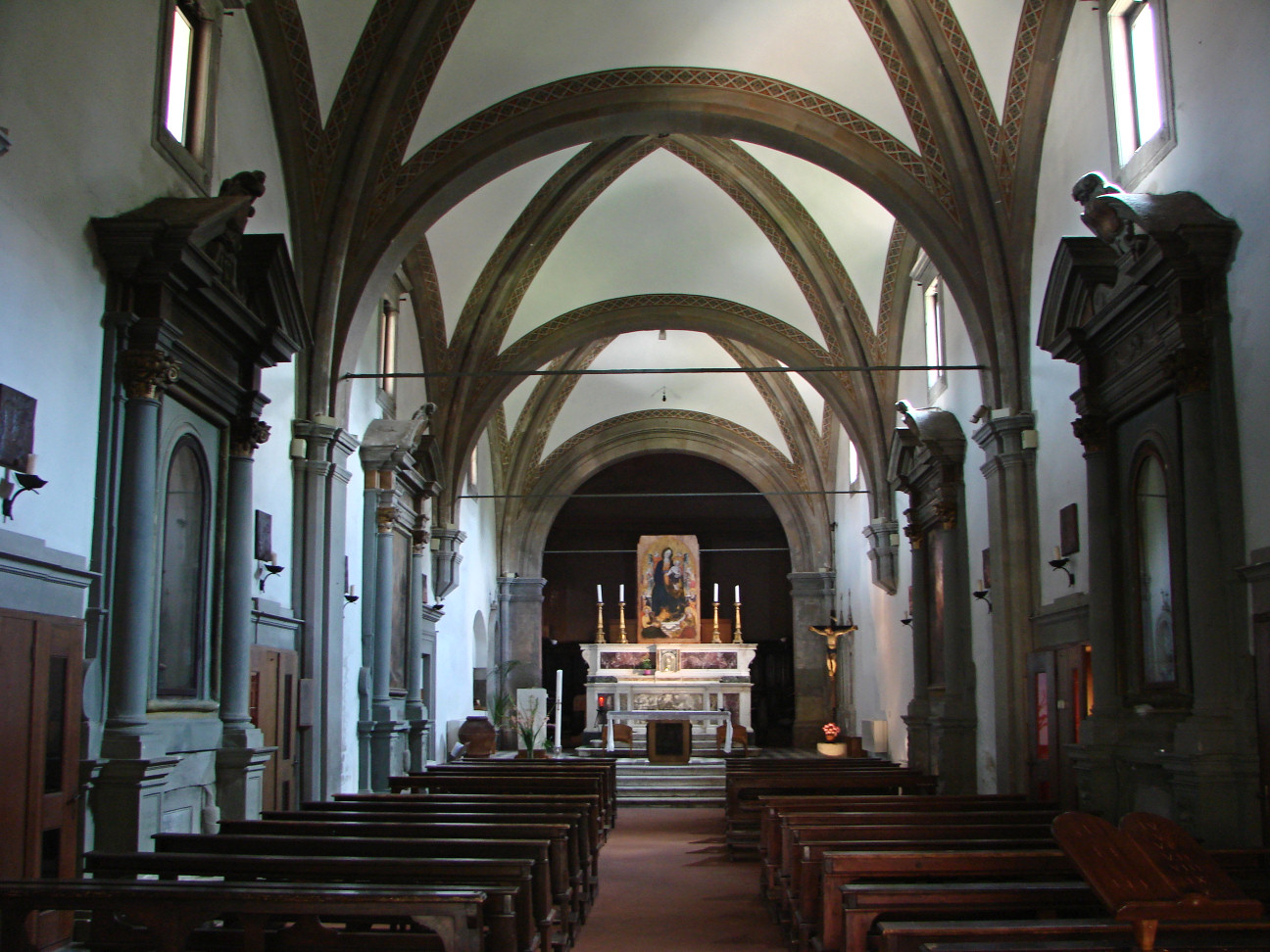
Interns

The region where the monastery was founded had been swampy and dredged initially by the 11-12th-century into a series of moats, hence the name of Fossabandi. By 1238, a Dominican convent had been founded at the site.

In the 14th-century, reconstruction was designed by Bartolomeo da Cantone. From about 1332, the monks began to occupy the safer, central site adjacent to the church of San Silvestro, located inside the city walls. In 1426, the complex was again refurbished, this time under the Franciscan order. A portico was added to the facade, and the cloister was erected. Traces of 16th-century frescoes remain in the lunettes of the cloister.

The church contain a canvas of the Madonna and Child with Angelic Musicians by the early 15th-century painter Alvaro Pirez di Evora. On the lateral altars are paintings St Francis and a Child and Angel and Madonna(1649) by Jacopo Vignali. Other works are a Blessed Salvatore da Orta Franciscan cures the ill and sick (circa 1606) by Paolo Guidotti and a St Francis prays before the Apparition of Christ and the Madonna (after 1627) by Francesco Curradi. It holds a wooden crucifix from the 15th century.

Previously a chapel held an altarpiece was a St John the Baptist by Clemente Bocciardi. A Madonna and Child with Saints Antony Abbot, Pope Gregory, John the Baptist, and Francis is now displayed in the Museo di San Matteo.

In 1810, Napoleonic governments suppressed the monastery. A Coronation of the Virgin (1474) was looted by Napoleonic forces and is now in the Dijon Museum. By 1875, the convent had been expropriated and was used as a Lazzaretto during the cholera epidemic of that year. The cloister is now a hotel.

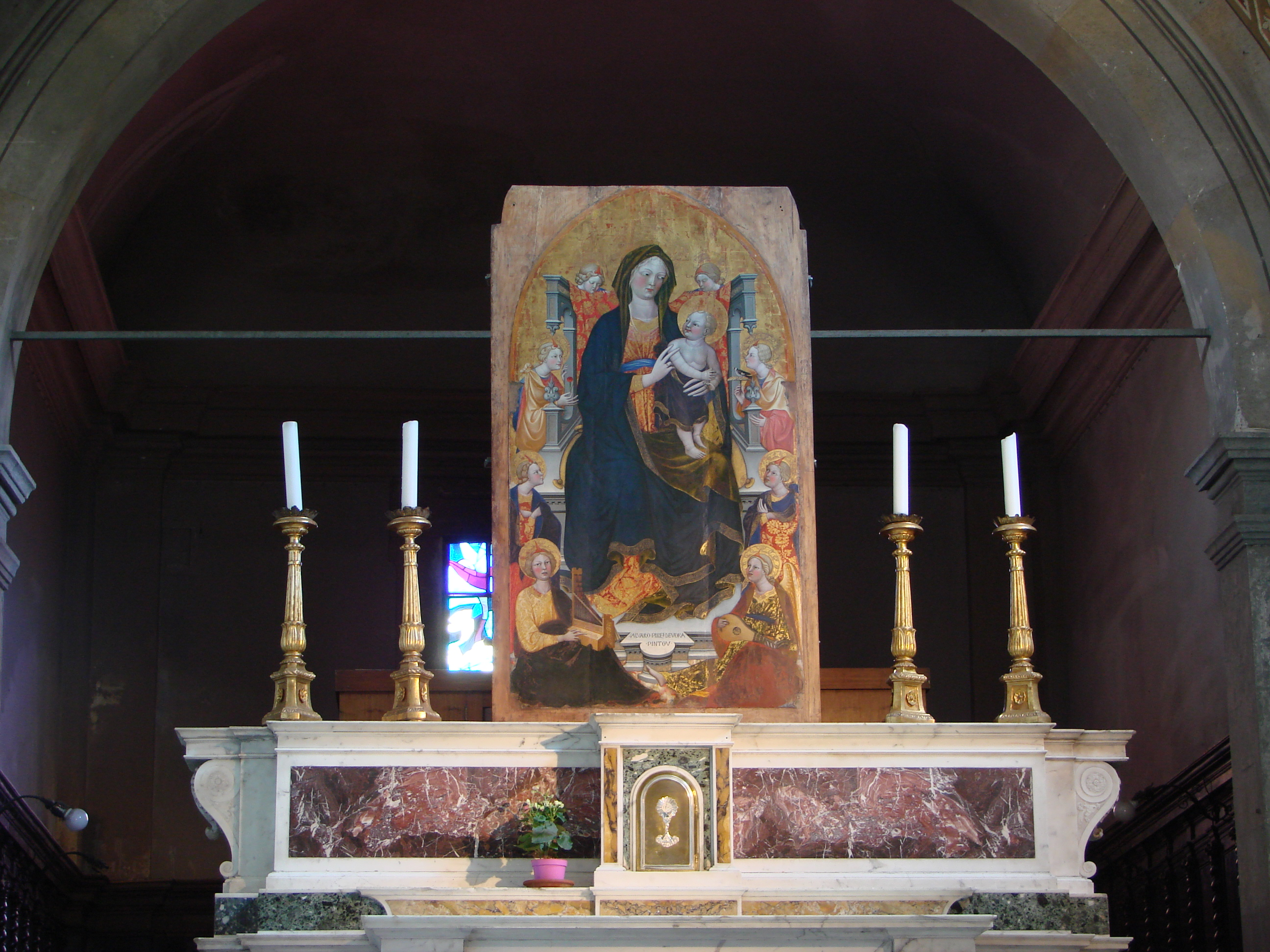
"Madonna and Child with Angelic Musicians"

== Sources ==
- Anna Maria Amonaci, Conventi toscani dell'Osservanza francescana, Firenze, Silvana 1997
- Daniela Stiaffini, Silvia Pagnin, S. Croce in Fossabanda, Pisa, ETS 2004
- Angelo Eugenio Mecca, Il convento di S. Croce in Fossabanda e l'Osservanza francescana a Pisa, Pontedera, CLD Libri 2011
