= Minoritenkirche (Vienna) =

Church in Vienna, Austria

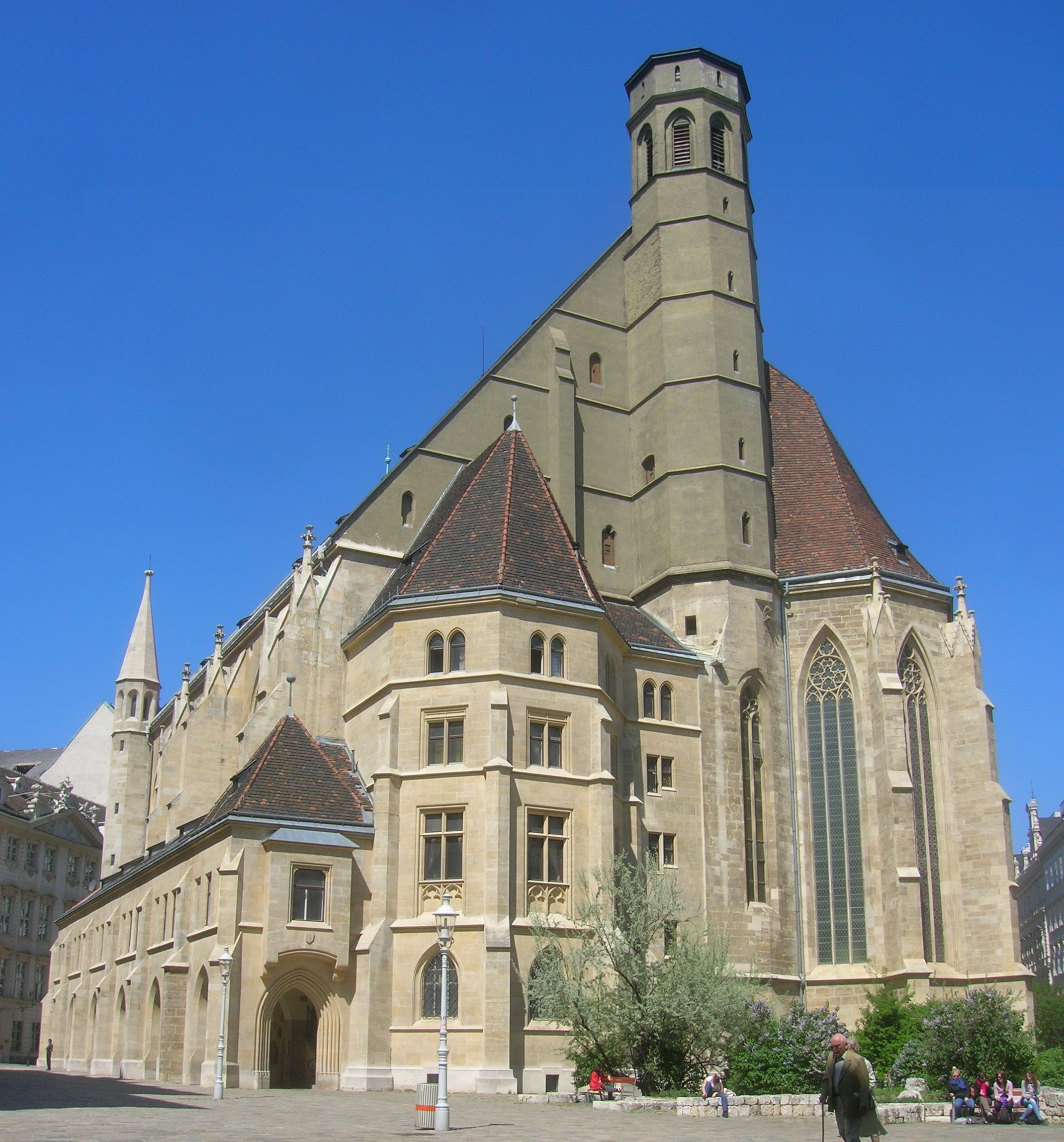
- Minoritenkirche, Vienna, Austria

- Location within Vienna Location within Austria

Religion
- Affiliation: Society of Saint Pius X
- Leadership: Congregazione Italiana Madonna della Neve

Location
- Location: Vienna, Austria
- Coordinates: 48.2094°N 16.3636°E

Architecture
- Architect: Jacobus Parisiensis
- Type: Church
- Style: Gothic
- Groundbreaking: 1276
- Completed: 1350

Specifications
- Length: 45 m (148 ft)
- Width: 35 m (115 ft)
- Width (nave): 15 m
- Height (max): 54 m

The Minoritenkirche (English: Friars Minor Conventual Church, related to the monastic Order of Friars Minor Conventual monks), formally called Italienische Nationalkirche Maria Schnee (English: Italian National Church of Mary of the Snows, related to the Italian Congregation who was the owner of this church), was built in French Gothic style in the Altstadt or First District of Vienna, Austria.

The site on which the church is built was given to followers of Francis of Assisi in 1224. The foundation stone was laid by King Ottokar II of Bohemia in 1276. Duke Albrecht II later supported the building process, especially the main portal. The Gothic Ludwig choir was built between 1316 and 1328, and used as a mausoleum in the 14th and 15th centuries. Construction of the church was completed in 1350.

The top of its belltower was damaged during the first Austro-Turkish war, rebuilt, then again destroyed again during the second Austro-Turkish war; the top was then replaced by a flat roof.

When Joseph II gave the church to the Italians as a present, they transferred the name Maria Schnee ("Mary of the Snows") from their nearby chapel which was subsequently destroyed.

Following disagreements between the church owner (the Italian Congregation Mary of the Snows) and the Archdiocese of Vienna, the Italian community was moved to the Church of the Holy Trinity of the Friars Minor in the Alservorstadt. After two years of uncertainty, in 2021 the Italian Congregation donated the Minoritenkirche to the Society of Saint Pius X, which operates it to this day.

== History ==
The church is located in the Innere Stadt of Vienna, northwest of the Hofburg, at the Minoritenplatz. The Minoriten were Franciscan friars (Latin: "fratres minores"). They were appointed to Vienna in 1224.

After the city fire of 1275, the foundation-stone for the new church was laid by Ottokar Přemysl. It was one of the first Gothic churches in the east-Austrian area. After Ottokar's death in the battle on the Marchfeld, he was laid out here for thirty weeks.

A crucial break came in 1782, when the Minorite church was closed in the course of the religious politics of Joseph II. The church thereupon was renamed the "Italian National Church of Mary of the Snow" (Madonna Della Neve) – a name which still exists today. In the course of the evacuation of their church, the Franciscan friars minor brought the cross provided with a picture of Christ hanging over the high altar of their church in Wimpassing, so that, when it came back to Vienna some centuries later, it was called the "Wimpassinger cross." Today a copy of it hangs in the Stephansdom cathedral.

In 2019, a split occurred between the owner of the church (the Italian Congregation Mary of the Snows, led by Mrs Daniela Panella Jirout) and Father Thomas Manalil, vicar of the parish, leading to the latter's resignation. Despite repeated requests by the Congregation, the Archdiocese of Vienna did not appoint a new vicar. After two years of uncertainty, on 25 May 2021 the Congregation donated the Minoritenkirche to the Society of Saint Pius X (SSPX), a traditionalist Catholic clerical fraternity which is currently in a state of formal schism with the Holy See. The SSPX started to operate the church on 3 June 2022. Since then, the Tridentine Mass is offered daily on working days and twice on Sunday.

== Exterior ==
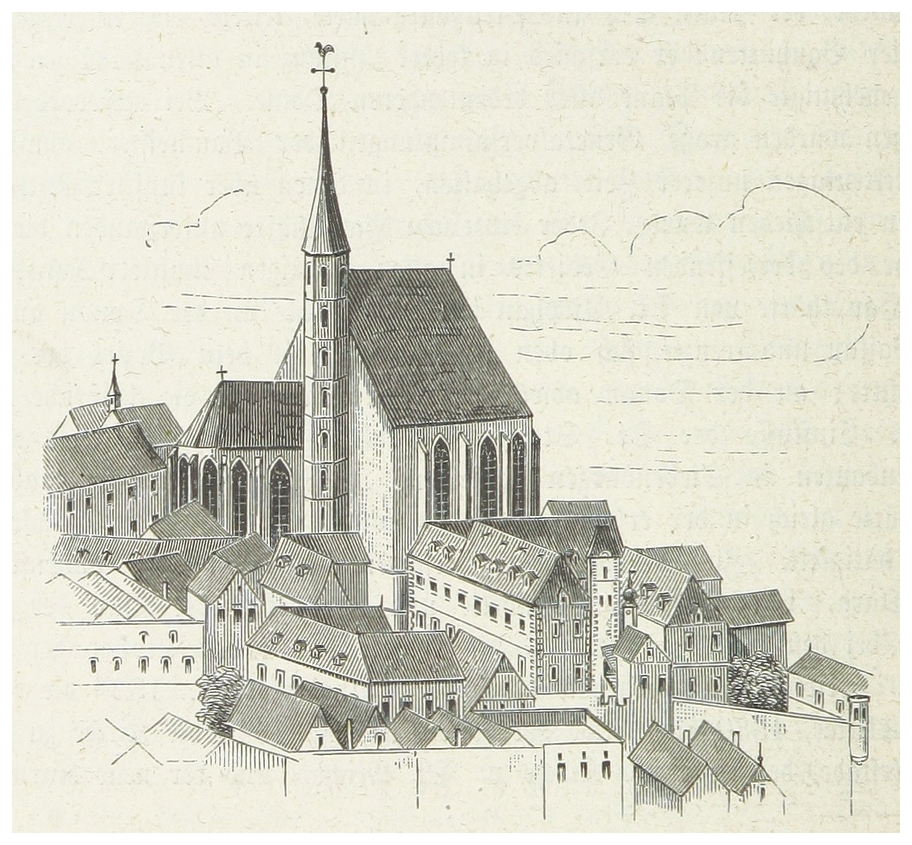
Appearance of the church with spire (from Geschichte der Stadt Wien, by Carl Weiss, 1872)

The whole building follows the pattern of French Cathedral architecture. The building masters are unknown; however, it is commonly attributed to Jacobus Parisiensis, Fra Giacomo of Paris, who was the confessor of Duke Albrecht II. The portal follows a French pattern, rare for Austria. The tympanum is divided by circle impacts into three fields, whereby in the middle field, Christ on a branch cross is displayed. On the left, is Mary with Mary Magdalene and other female figures; on the right, John the Evangelist, Saint Longinus the soldier, and other male figures. The outermost male and female figures could represent Duke Albrecht II and his wife Johanna of Pfirt, particularly since the male figure seems to wear a Duke hat. The figures are very elegant and fine-linked represented: probably a French influence, and, at the same time, an important style characteristic of the Minoritenwerkstatt, which date back until approximately 1360.

In the course of the new dedication, numerous changes were made by Johann Ferdinand Hetzendorf von Hohenberg, which were aimed particularly at the removal of baroque on the inside. Nevertheless, it was not in the final result "Regotisierung," as this was called more frequently, since also parts of the Gothic building style of the Church were eliminated, in particular, the long choir.

In 1529, the spire was destroyed for the first time but rebuilt in 1633. During the second Turkish siege of 1683, it once again was destroyed. The destroyed spire was replaced by a flat roof.

In the following centuries, the church remained to a large extent unchanged, only that in different wars the tower suffered damage several times. Around 1900, the last major changes took place, in particular, the construction of the choir-like sacristy. In the course of the building of underground subways, into the late 1980s, the foundation walls of the long choir were found.

== Interior ==
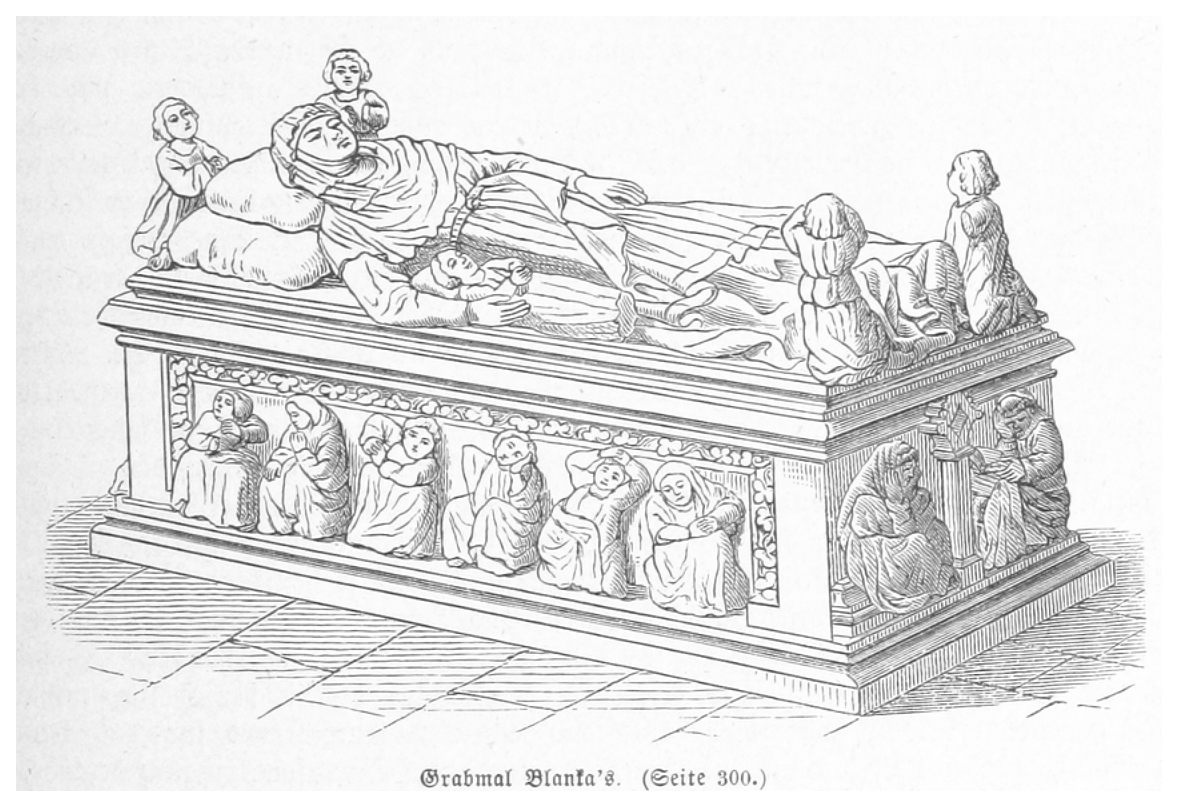
Drawing of the tomb of Blanche of France, Duchess of Austria, which was lost around 1784

There were important changes under the first Habsburgs. Blanche of France, Duchess of Austria, the wife Rudolf III, left a chapel for her grandfather, Louis IX of France (Heiliger Ludwig von Frankreich in German) on the northern side of the church, which was completed in 1328. It had a separate entrance and no connection to the nave. This was changed circa 1340, as the Ludwig chapel was combined with the two naves of the church forming a church hall with two choirs and three naves. Into the church therefore new columns were added and a new portal was constructed in the west.

The Chapel of Sf Anthony of Padua holds a Baroque altar made of polychrome marble and a glass window in the style of the 17th century.

The walls of the church are covered with frescoes of the coats of arms of Austrian aristocratic families who either contributed to the construction of the church or are buried here.

=== High altar ===
The Neo-Gothic high altar was made by Ferdinand Hohenberg. On the altarpiece is an image by Ignaz Unterberger of the Virgin Mary similar to the one venerated in Our Lady of the Snows in Rome. Flanking it are four statues: Saints Stephen of Hungary and John the Baptist to the left, and Saints John the Evangelist and Leopold the Glorious to the right.

=== Mosaic of The Last Supper ===
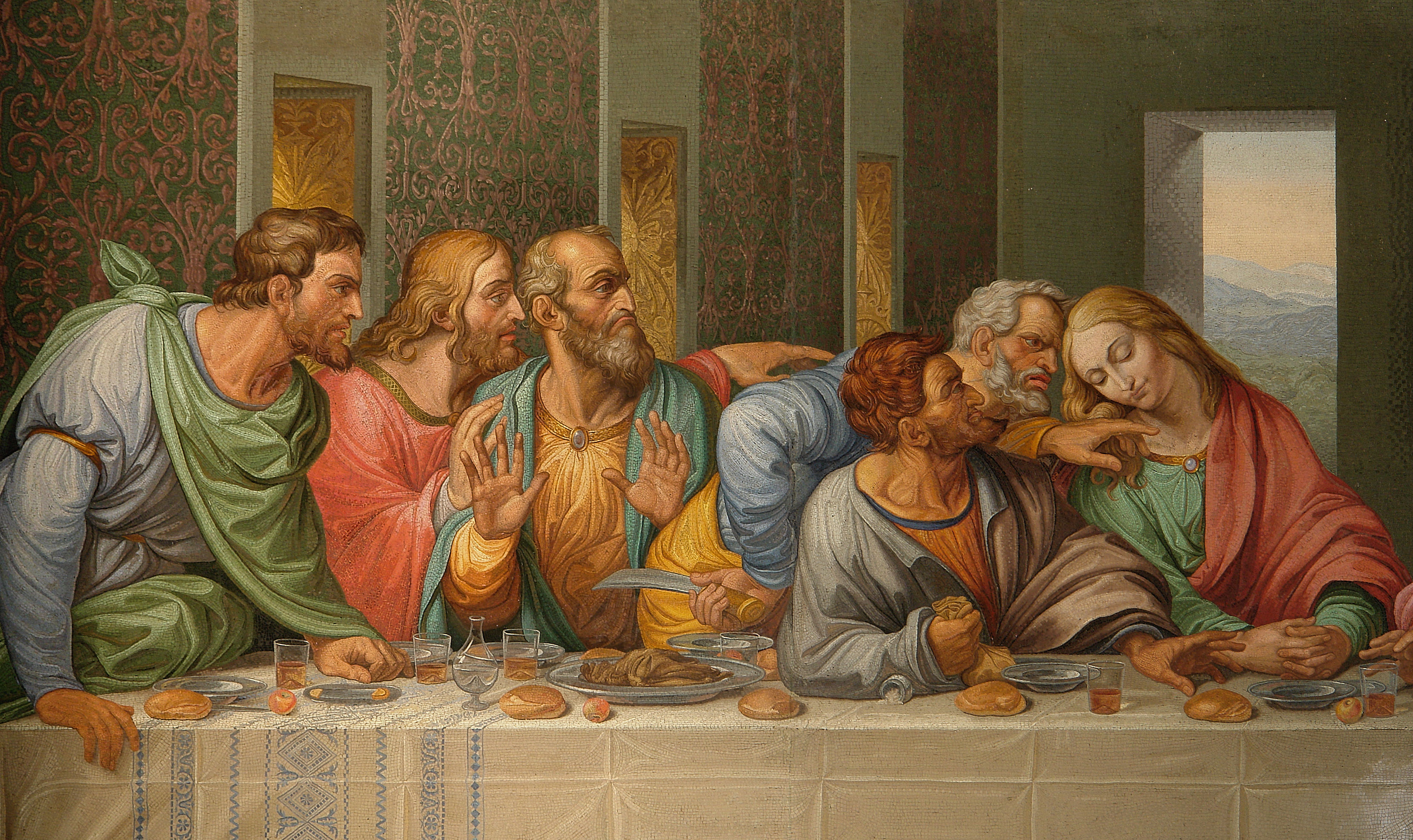
Leonardo da Vinci's The Last Supper by Giacomo Raffaelli

There is a life-sized copy of Leonardo da Vinci's The Last Supper on the church's northern wall. It is a mosaic made by the Roman mosaic artist Giacomo Raffaelli, commissioned by Napoleon I in 1809, but still unfinished upon his abdication. Francis II of Austria bought it, wanting to install it in the Belvedere in Vienna. As it was too large for the building, it was donated by Emperor Ferdinand I of Austria to the Italian Congregation and set up on the north wall of the church, where it remains to this day. The mosaic is 9.18 x 4.47 m and weighs approximately 20 tons.

=== Monument for Pietro Metastasio ===
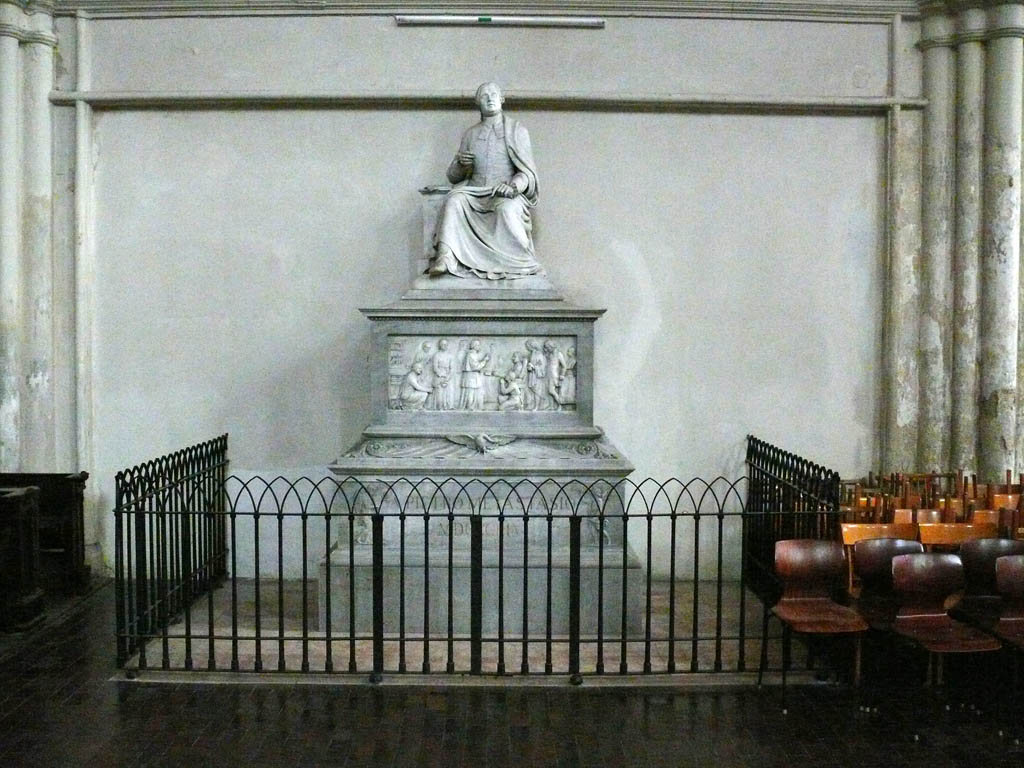
Monument for Pietro Metastasio

This monument, made by Lucardi, was erected in memory of the Poet Laureate Metastasio in 1855. In the central relief, Pope Pius VI is depicted blessing the dying poet. Behind him are the composer Salieri followed by W.A. Mozart, while J. Haydn is looking at the Pope.

=== Madonna of Rossellino ===
This Madonna was executed by the Italian artist Antonio Gamberelli, nicknamed Antonio Rossellino, in Carrara marble (15th century).

=== Paintings ===
- The glorification of St. John Nepomuck, by Bartolomeo Altomonte
- The foundation of abbey Klosteneuburg, by Martino Altomonte
- The Holy Family by Hautzinger
- The Tragedy of the Plague, by Steiner
- St. Benedict and the Miracle of St Nicholas, by Daniel Gran
- Delicate figure of St Francis of Assisi, painted by an unknown Master of the 16th century.

== Trivia ==
- The Church is the subject of Adolf Hitler's most renowned work of art, a watercolor painted in 1910. The painting is mentioned several times in the novel Deadeye Dick by Kurt Vonnegut.

== Images ==
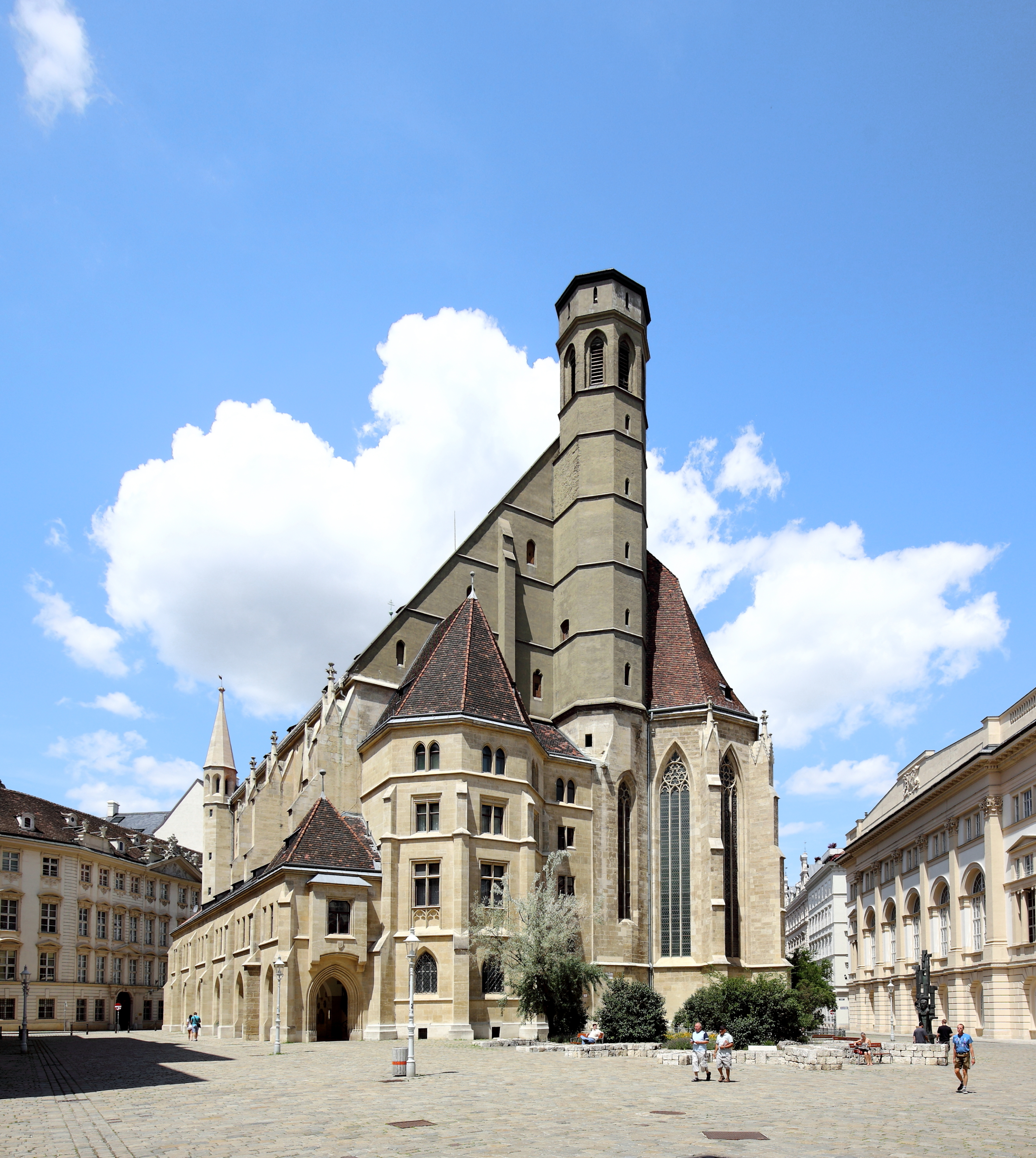
Minoritenplatz square in front of church

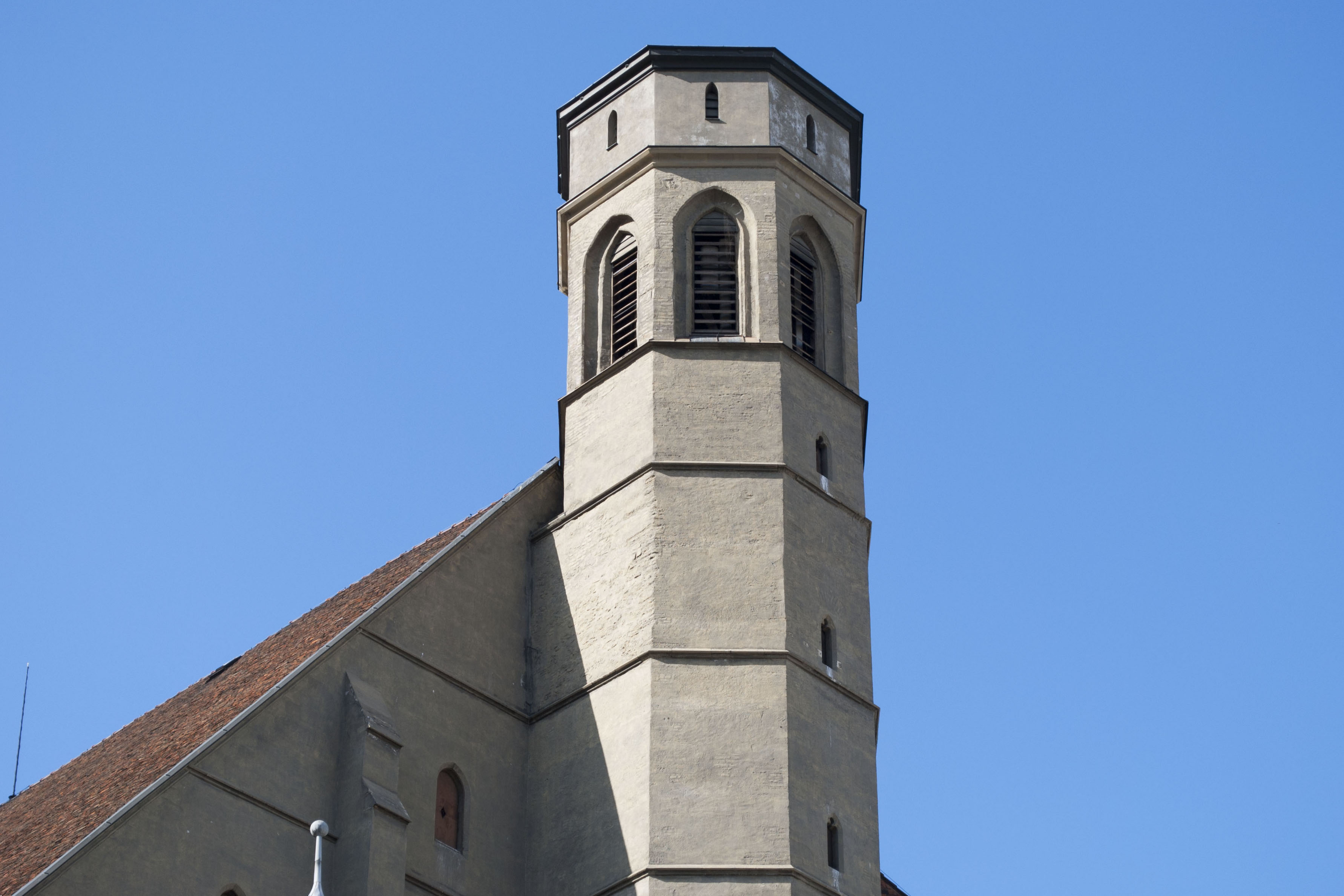
Belltower

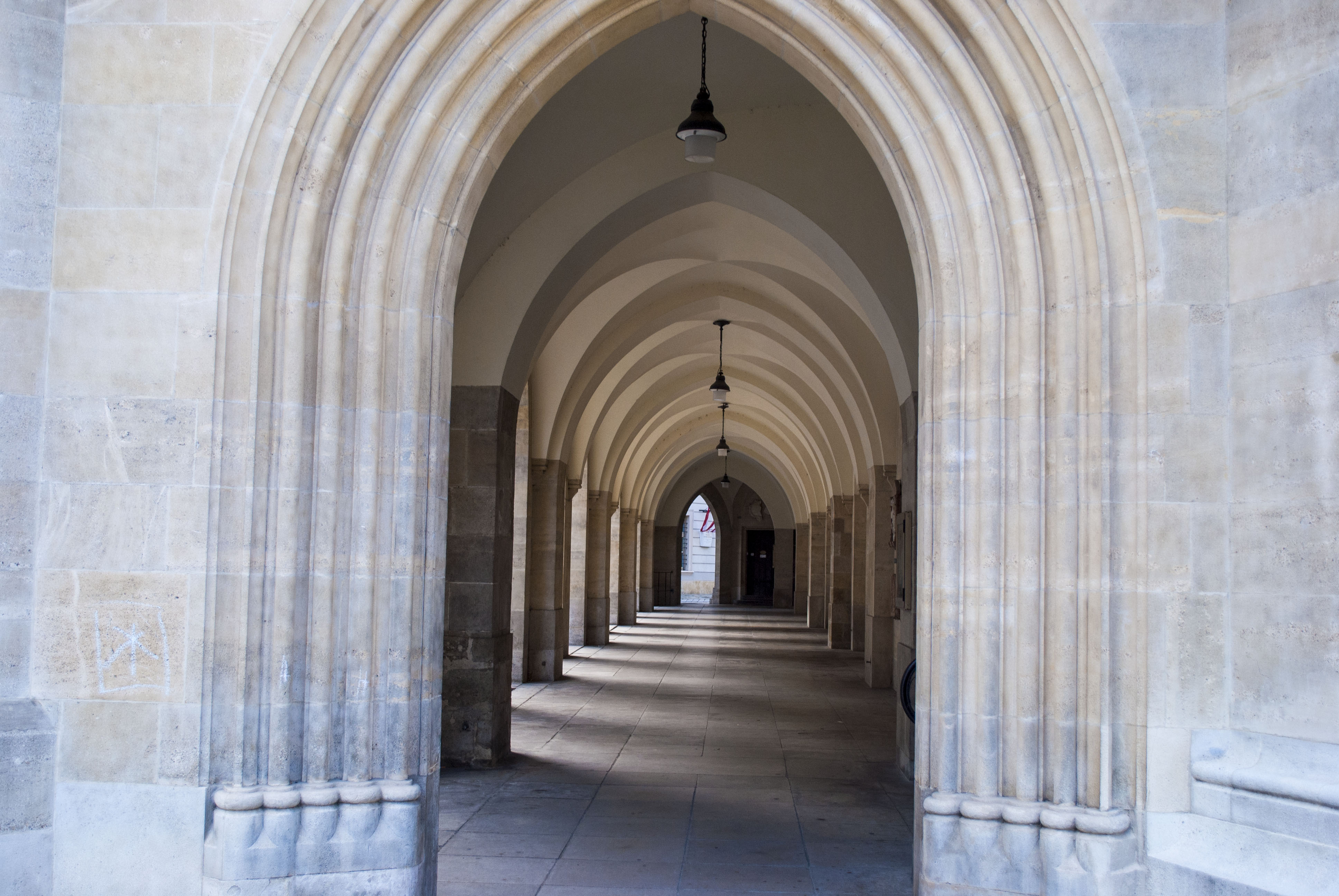
Passageway

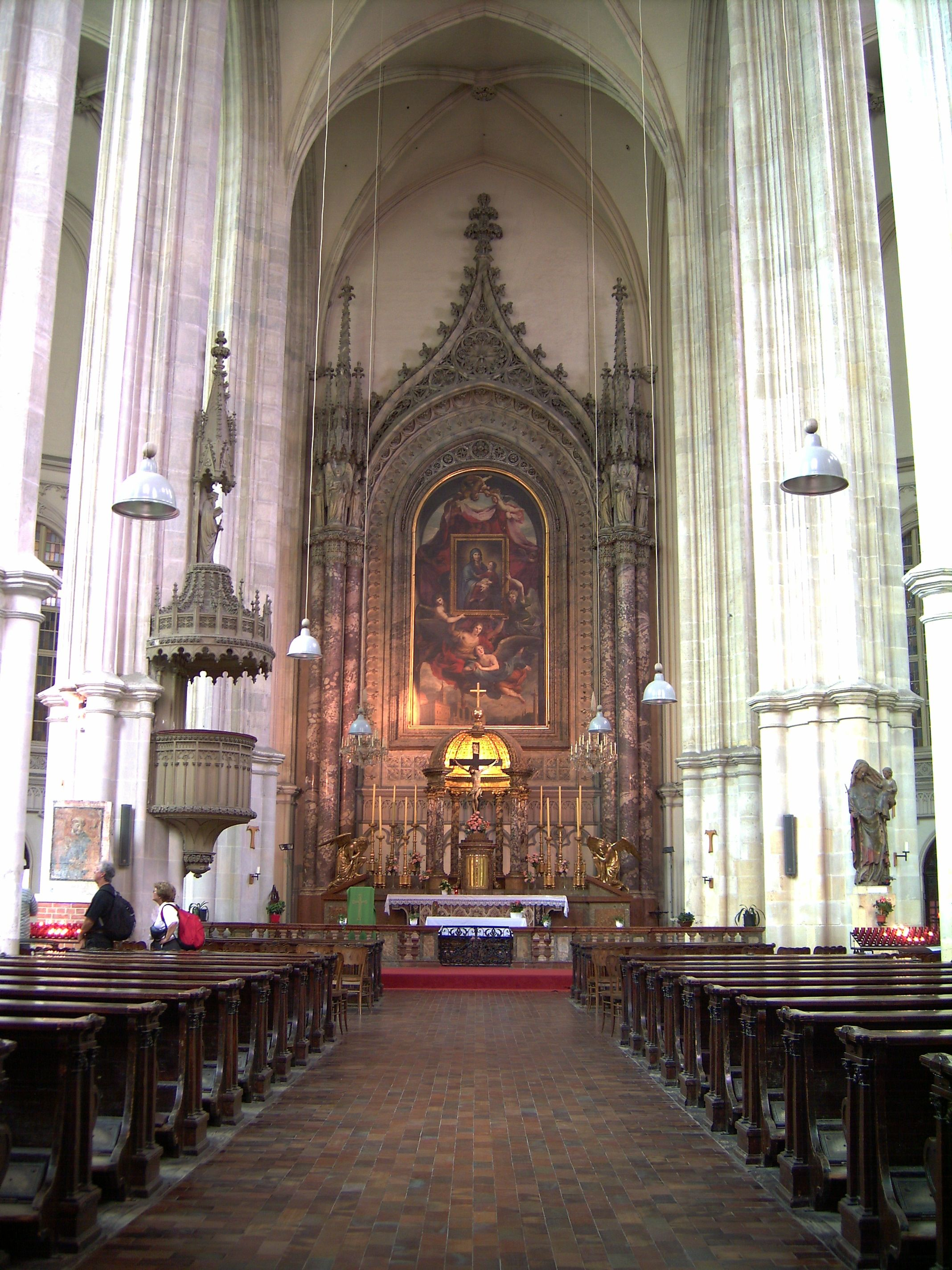
View of the altar

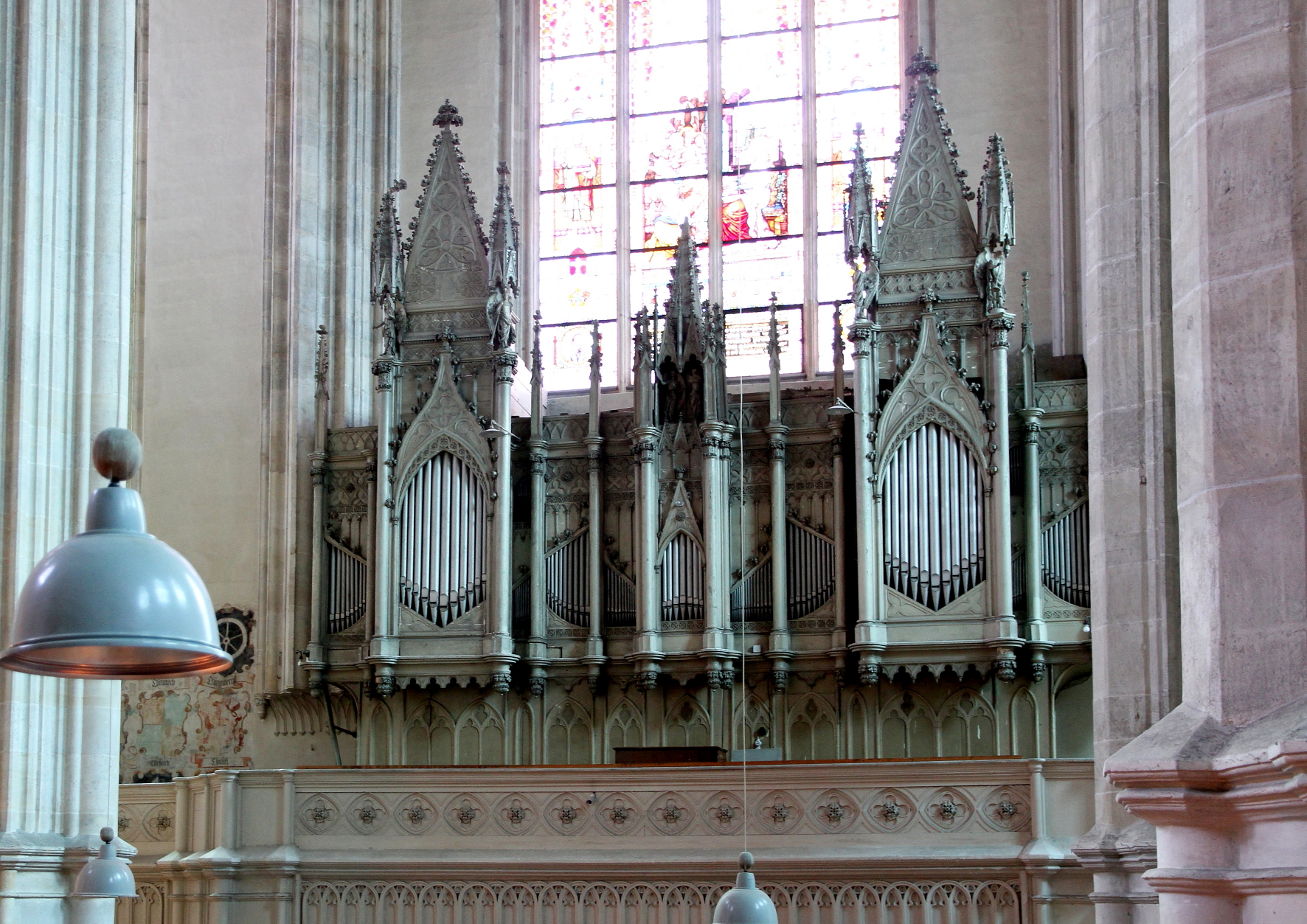
Organ

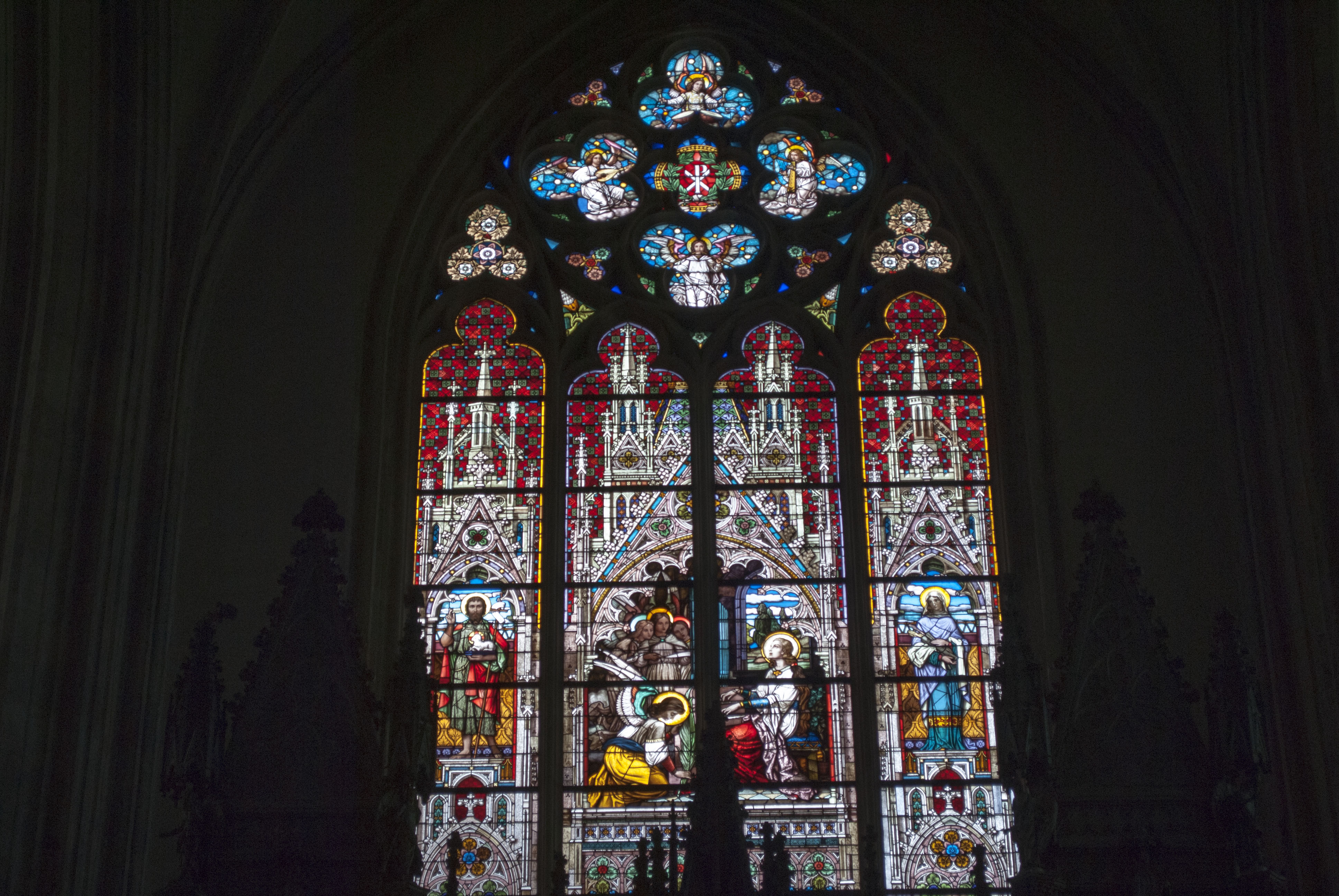
Stained glass window

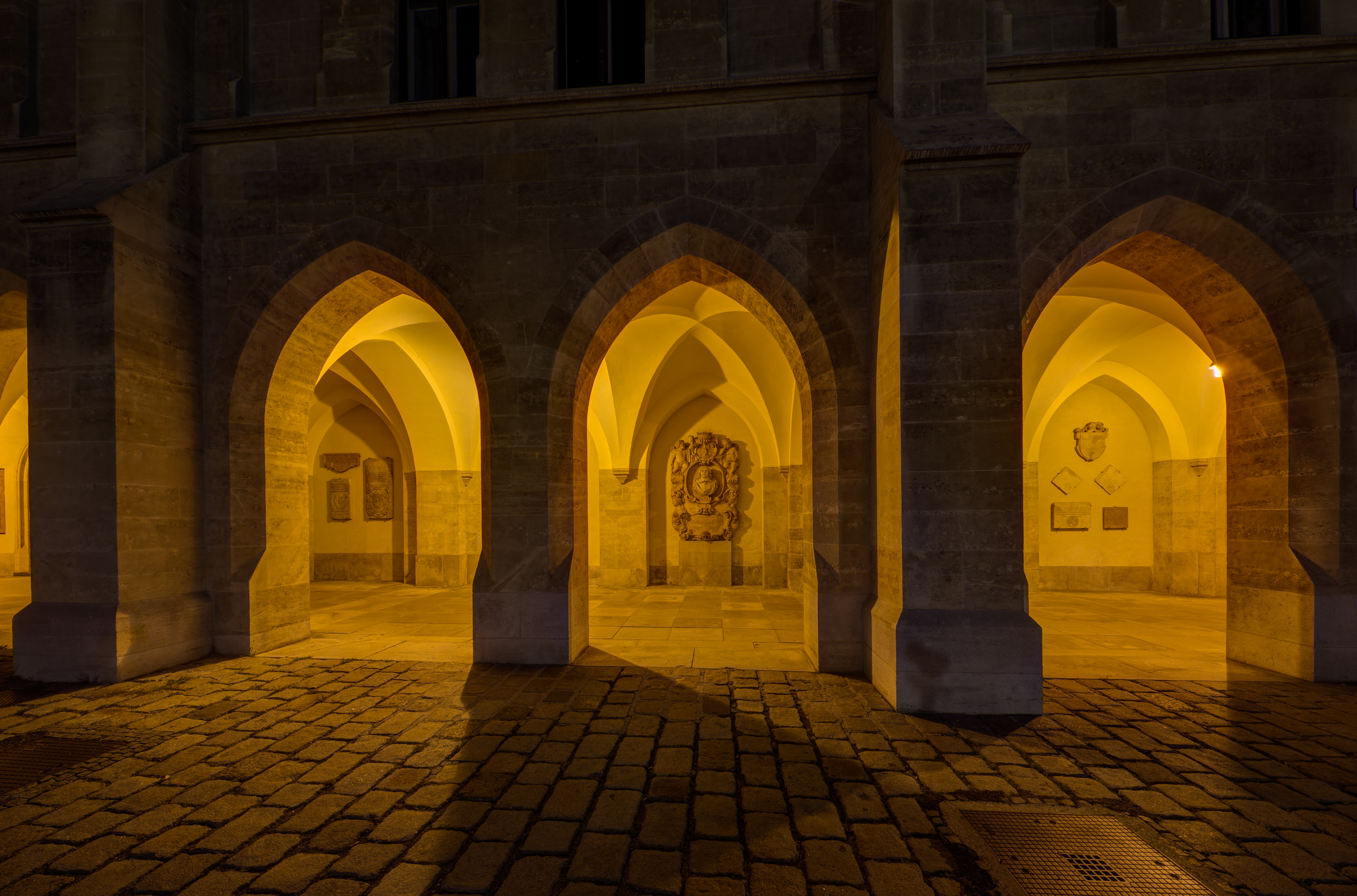
Arcades with epitaphs, at the square
