= Adriaen van der Spelt =

Dutch painter

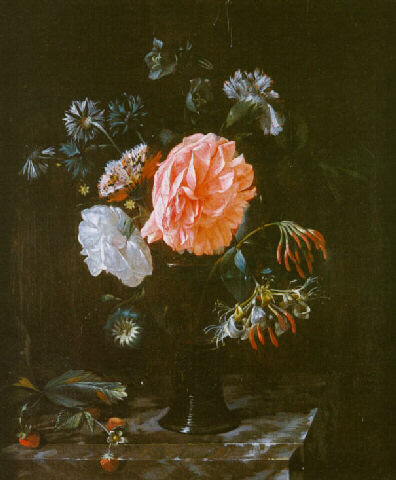
Still life with flowers

Adriaen van der Spelt (c. 1630 in Leiden – 1673 in Gouda), was a Dutch Golden Age flower painter.

== Biography ==
According to Houbraken, whose comments were based on the Gouda stories by Ignatius Walvis, he was an excellent flower painter born in Leiden, but his parentage was from Gouda. He spent many years at the court of Brandenburg working for Frederick William I, Elector of Brandenburg, but moved to Gouda to marry a third time with a nasty wife from Groningen who drove him to his grave.

According to the RKD he was a flower painter who spent the years 1664-1670 at the court of Brandenburg.
