= Francisco Agustín y Grande =

Spanish painter (1753–1800)

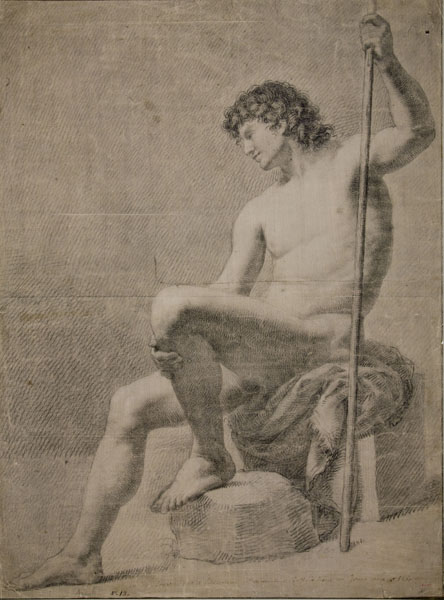
Nu masculí (1780) MNAC.

Francisco Agustín y Grande (1753–1800) was a Spanish painter of the Neoclassic style. He was born in Barcelona. He studied in Rome under Anton Raphael Mengs, and returned to become the director of a school of design in Cordoba. In 1799, he became a member for the Royal Academy of San Fernando in Madrid. He mainly produced devotional paintings for churches in Cordoba.
