= The Musical Contest =

Painting by Jean-Honoré Fragonard

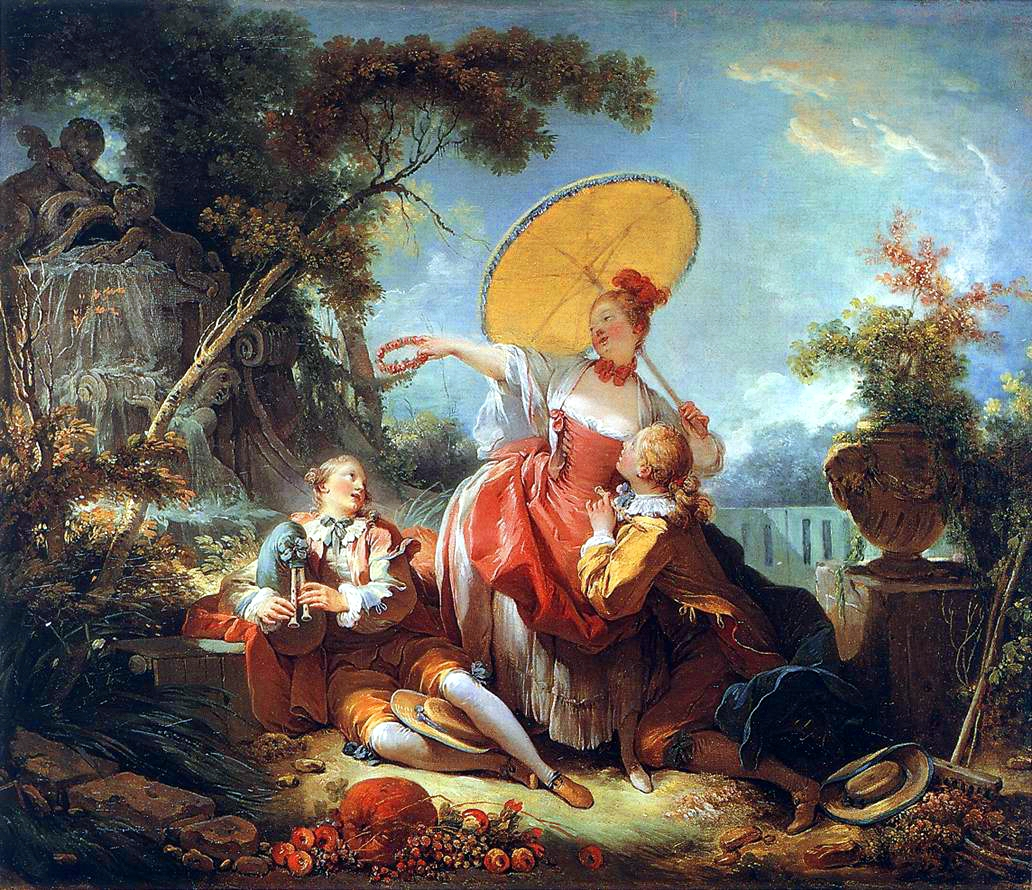
- Artist: Jean-Honoré Fragonard
- Year: c.1755
- Type: Oil on canvas, genre painting
- Dimensions: 62 cm × 74 cm (24 in × 29 in)
- Location: Wallace Collection; London

The Musical Contest is a c.1755 genre painting by the French artist Jean-Honoré Fragonard. Rococo in style, it is part of the tradition of fête galante pictures popular in the eighteenth century. In a garden scene, two suitors compete for the attention of a woman by staging a musical contest.

Today the painting is in the Wallace Collection in London having been acquired in 1842 by the Marquess of Hertford. It was mistakenly identified as being by Frangonard's teacher François Boucher.

== Bibliography ==
- Ingamells, John. The Wallace Collection: French before 1815. Wallace Collection, 1985.
- Levey, Michael. Painting and Sculpture in France, 1700–1789. Yale University Press, 1993.
- Molotiu, Andrei. Fragonard's Allegories of Love. J. Paul Getty Museum, 2007.
