= Charles-Antoine Clevenbergh =

Flemish painter

Charles-Antoine Clevenbergh (14 July 1755 – 6 January 1810) was a Flemish painter of still-life.

Clevenbergh was born in Louvain in 1755. He studied historical painting under Verhaeghen, and made large pen-and-ink drawings, which possess much merit. He died in 1810.

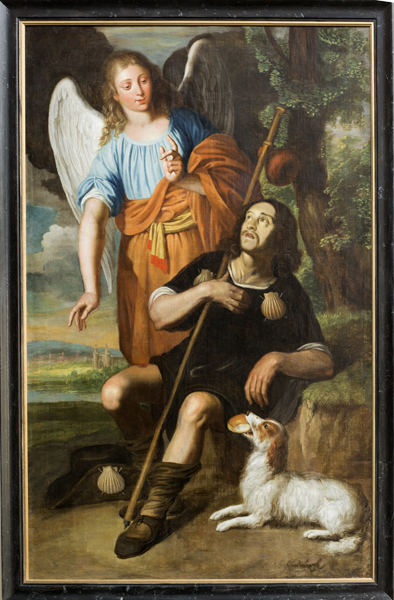
Onze-Lieve-Vrouwekerk (Diest)

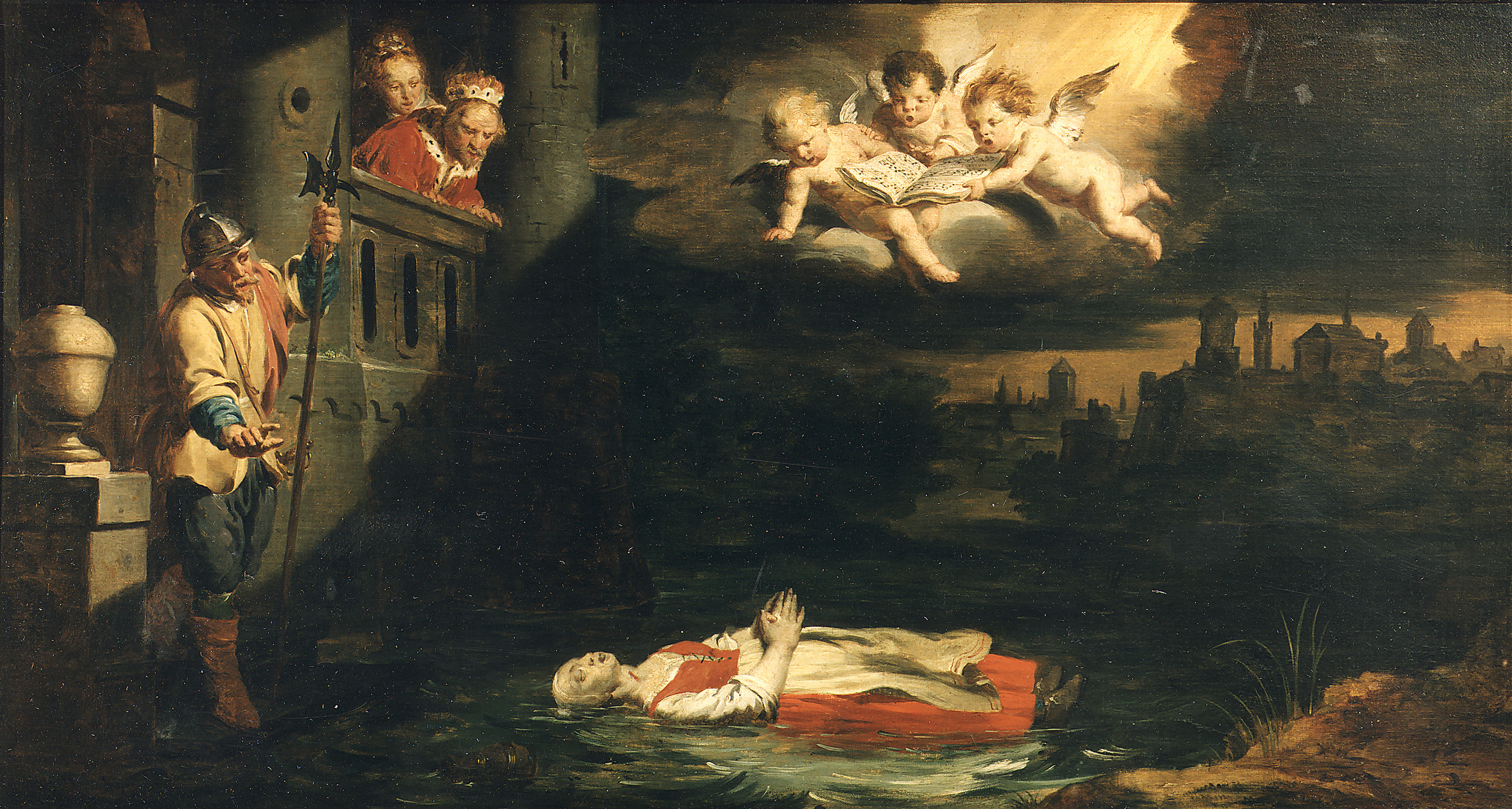
Margaret of Louvain (after Pieter-Jozef Verhaghen)
