= Pieter de Bloot =

Dutch painter

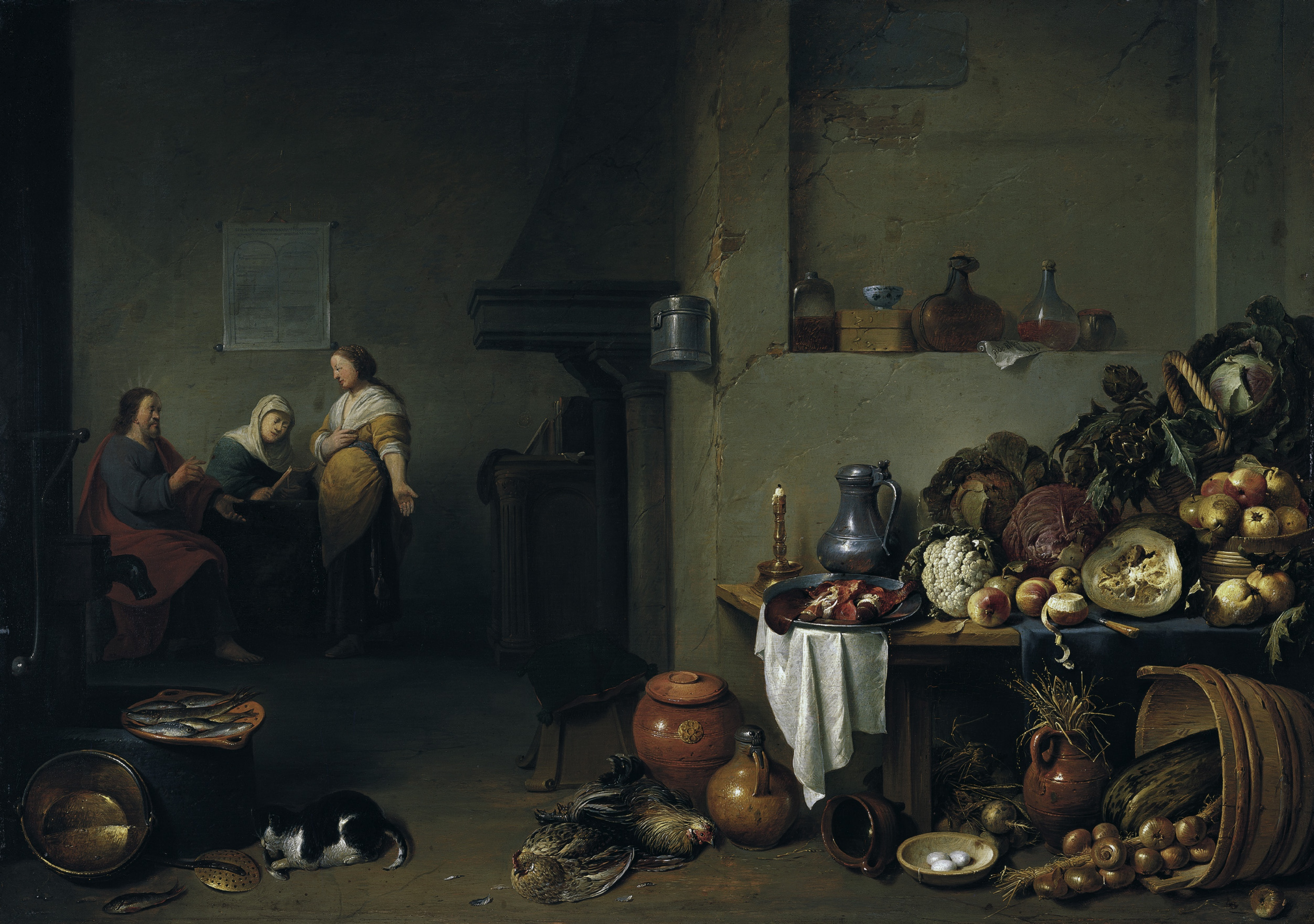
Pieter de Bloot, Christ with Maria and Martha, Liechtenstein Museum, 1637

Pieter de Bloot (1601 – c. 6 November 1658) was a Dutch painter.

De Bloot, who was born and died in Rotterdam, primarily painted landscapes and genre works, especially of countryside views and peasant subjects. He also periodically painted religious subjects. Between 1624 and 1630 de Bloot was married three times, since his first two wives died only a few months after their weddings. De Bloot died in 1658.
