= Francisco Bustamante (painter) =

Spanish painter

Francisco Bustamante (c. 1680–1737) was a Spanish painter.

Bustamante was born at Oviedo, and studied painting with Miguel Jacinto Menendez at Madrid. On the ceiling of the sacristy of Oviedo Cathedral he painted a fresco representing 'The Assumption of the Blessed Virgin,' from a sketch sent from Rome; also a series for the cloister of the Franciscans. He excelled in portraiture; his likenesses, executed with fidelity and skill, are to be met with in the best houses of the Asturias. He died in Oviedo.
