= Richard Collins (artist) =

English painter (1755–1831)

Richard Collins (30 January 1755 – 5 August 1831) was an English painter who specialised in portrait miniature.

== Life ==
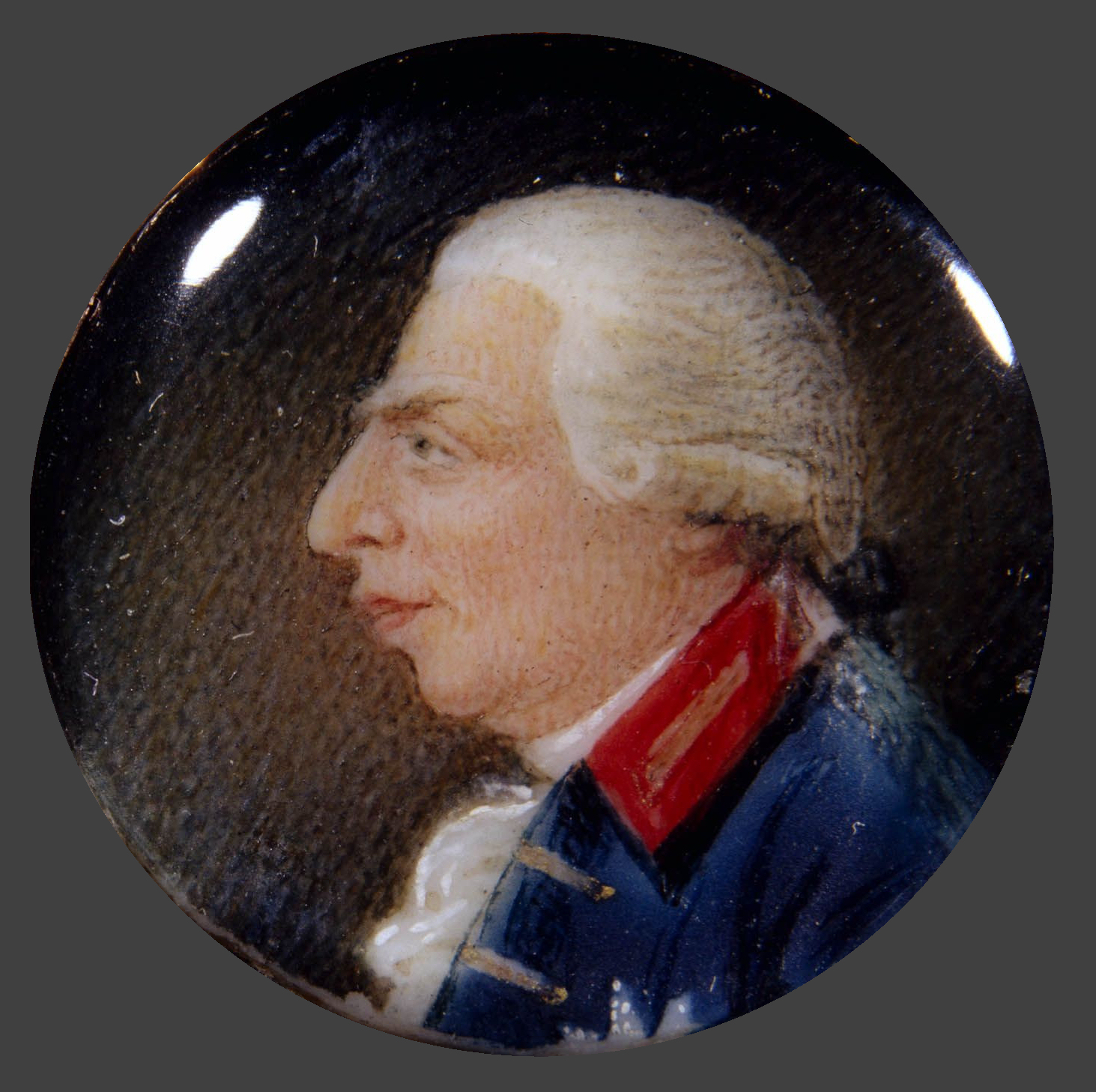
c. 1790 miniature portrait of George III by Collins

Richard Collins was born in Gosport, Hampshire on 30 January 1755. He studied enamel-painting with Jeremiah Meyer. In 1777, Collins exhibited several of his portraits at the Royal Academy.

Collins shared with Richard Cosway and Samuel Shelley the fashionable sitters of the day, and in 1789, was appointed principal portrait-painter in enamel to George III. He executed some fine miniature portraits of the royal family. Having acquired a comfortable income by his art, Collins left London in 1811, and retired at Pershore, Worcestershire, resigning his post in the royal service.

About 1828, however, his love of art and culture led Collins to return to London, and he resided in the vicinity of Regent's Park until his death on 5 August 1831.
