= Landscape with a Watermill =

Painting by François Boucher

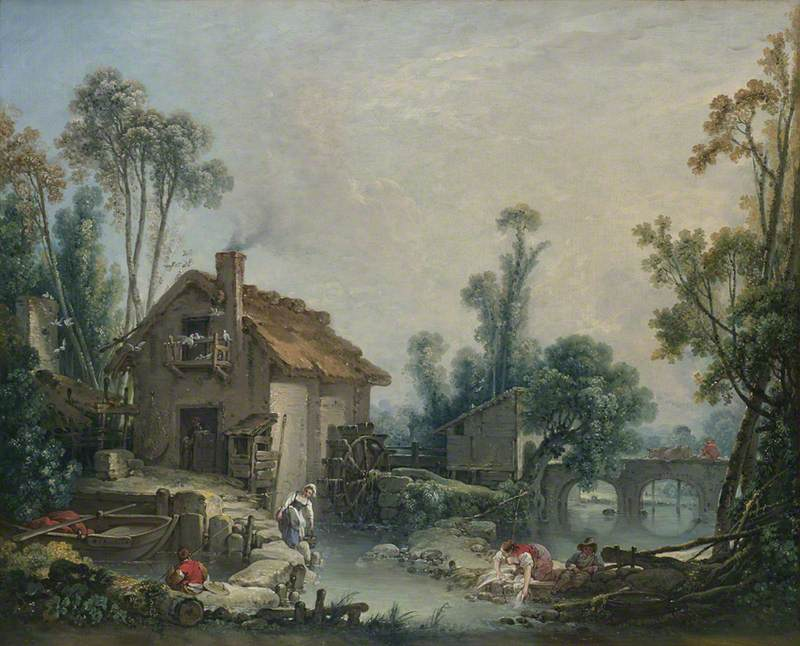
- Artist: François Boucher
- Year: 1755
- Type: Oil on canvas, landscape painting
- Dimensions: 57.2 cm × 73 cm (22.5 in × 29 in)
- Location: National Gallery; London

Landscape with a Watermill is a 1755 landscape painting by the French artist François Boucher. It features a picturesque view of an old watermill near a bridge. In the foreground figures are seen fishing or washing clothes in the river. Although an idealised view, it may have been loosely inspired by a real setting somewhere on the River Seine to the west of Paris. Boucher was a leading figure of the rococo style, then at its height in France under the patronage of Louis XV and Madame du Pompadour.

The painting is now in the National Gallery in London, which purchased it in 1966.

== Bibliography ==
- Milam, Jennifer & Parsons Nicola (ed.) Making Ideas Visible in the Eighteenth Century. University of Delaware Press, 2022.
- Wine, Humphrey. The Eighteenth Century French Paintings. National Gallery Company, 2018.
