= Giacomo Raffaelli (artist) =

Italian artist

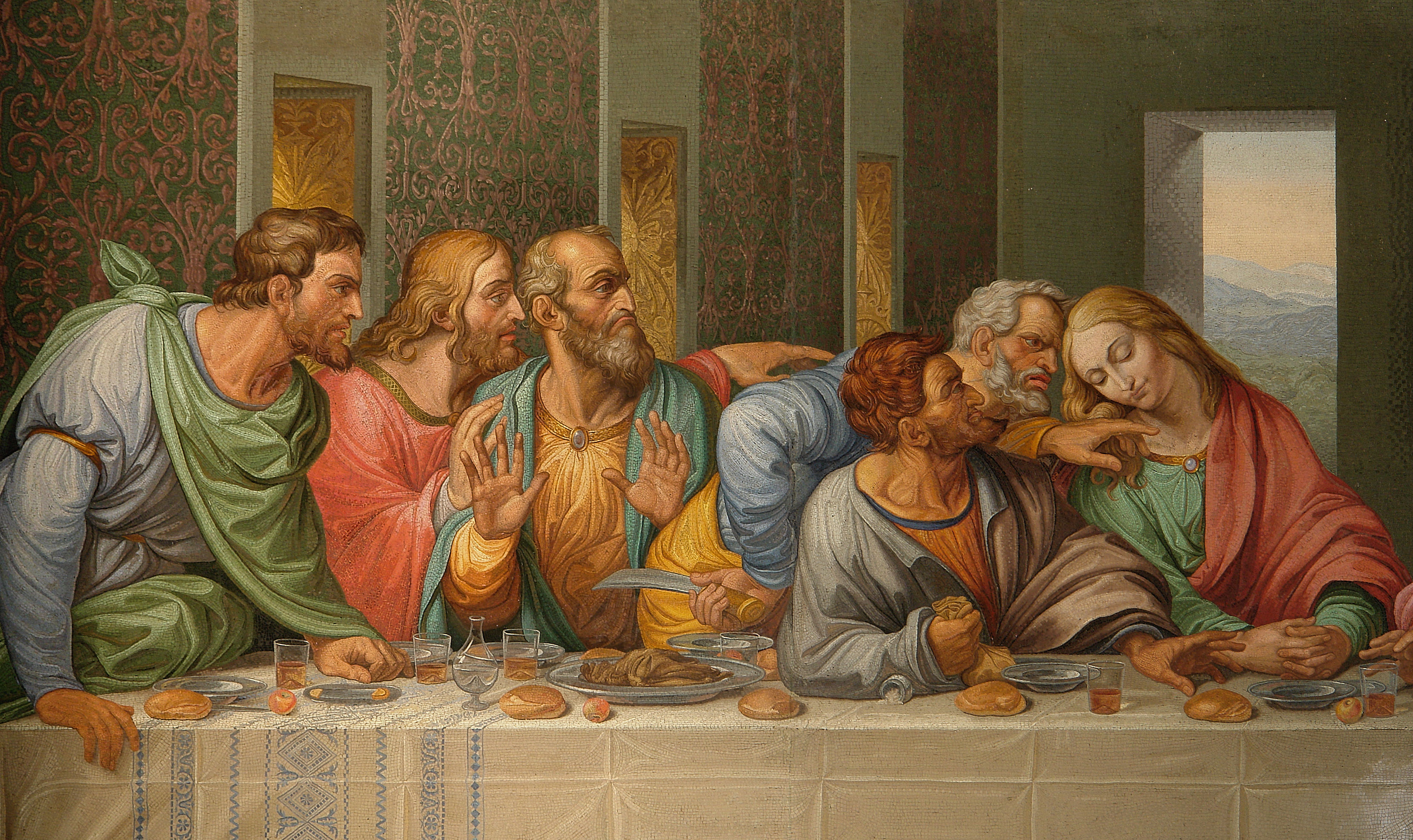
The Last Supper mosaic (Vienna).

Giacomo Raffaelli (February 2, 1753 - October 11, 1836) was an Italian mosaicist from Rome. He is the author of a copy of Leonardo da Vinci's Last Supper commissioned by Napoleon I. The mosaic resides at Vienna in the Minoritenkirche.

== Sources ==
- Massimo Alfieri, "New Notes on Giacomo Raffaelli and Michelangelo Barberi"In:Micromosaics: The Gilbert Collection, by Jeanette Hanisee Gabriel, Anna Maria Massinelli, Judy Rudoe, Massimo Alfieri, Philip Wilson Publishers, London 2000, pp. 263-279
