= Portrait of Sir Neil O'Neill =

Painting by John Michael Wright

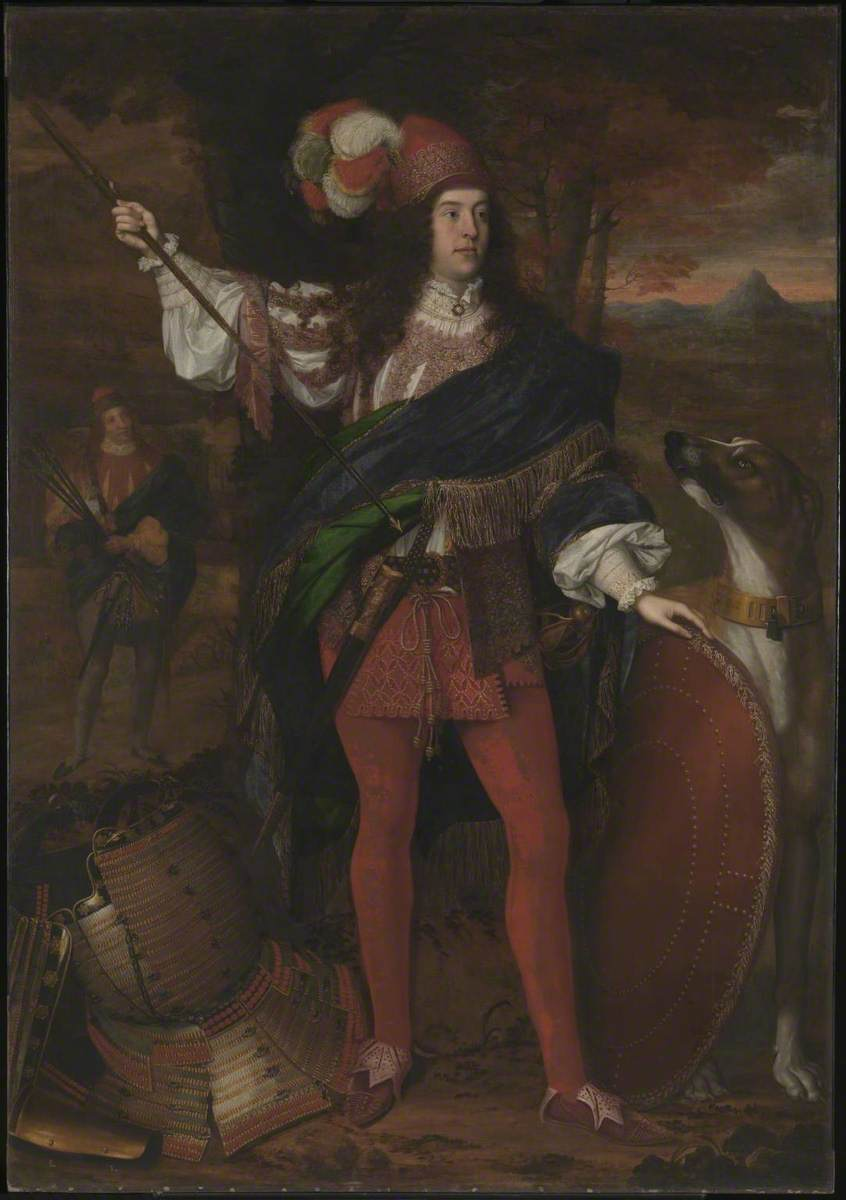
- Artist: John Michael Wright
- Year: 1680
- Type: Oil on canvas, portrait painting
- Dimensions: 232.7 cm × 163.2 cm (91.6 in × 64.3 in)
- Location: Tate Britain; London

Portrait of Sir Neil O'Neill is a 1680 portrait painting by the English artist John Michael Wright. It depicts the Irish landowner and soldier Sir Neil O'Neill, 2nd Baronet. He is depicted in the costume of a traditional Gaelic Irish chieftain and accompanied by a. Irish Wolfhound The inclusion and meaning of the Japanese armour beside him has been subject to debate, but possibly making reference to the wave of anti-Catholic sentiment and persecution that swept through Britain and Ireland in the wake of the Popish Plot. John Michael Wright was one of the leading court painters during the Stuart era. At the time of this work Charles II was on the throne. Wright, himself a Catholic fled to Ireland during the Popish Plot where he painted members of the Irish Catholic elite.

Loyal to James II after the Glorious Revolution of 1688, O'Neill served as Lord Lieutenant of Armagh and fought in the Jacobite Irish Army raised to resist the Williamite conquest of Ireland. He was killed in action at the Battle of the Boyne in 1690. The painting is today in the collection of the Tate Britain in London, having been acquired in 1957 with the assistance of the Art Fund.

== Bibliography ==
- Bindman, David (ed) The History of British Art,, 1600-1870. Yale Center for British Art, 2008.
- Marshall, Catherine. Irish Art Masterpieces. Hugh Lauter Levin Associates, 1994
- Monkhouse, Christopher P., Fitzpatrick, Leslie & Laffan, William (ed.) Ireland: Crossroads of Art and Design, 1690-1840. Art Institute of Chicago, 2015.
