= Pier Lorenzo Spoleti =

Italian painter (1680–1726)

Pier Lorenzo Spoleti (1680–1726) was an Italian painter of the Baroque period, active mainly in his natal city of Genoa. He was born and died in Finale Ligure.

Spoleti's parents died when he was young and he went to live with an aunt, who, seeing his interest in art, sent him to apprentice with Domenico Piola at the age of 15. He returned to his hometown after a few years, where he married; then he traveled to Cádiz, Spain, to look for employment, leaving his wife behind in Finale Ligure. From Cádiz, he followed a patron who had been reassigned to Madrid. He soon traveled to Lisbon, where he worked for four years, then returned to Genoa.

In Genoa, his former master, Piola, was impressed with his skills. Spoleti was known for portrait painting, and made reproductions of master paintings by Titian and others whose works he had seen in Madrid. For the parish church of Finale he painted copies of major canvases for the chorus. His major pupils were Giuseppe Folco, Giuseppe Piuma and Giacomo Grana.
