= Judy Rudoe =

Judith Ann Rudoe FSA (born April 1951) is a curator in the British Museum and a specialist in the history of jewellery.

== Selected publications ==
- Charlemagne's Europe. British Museum Publications, London, 1975. ISBN 0714100439
- Decorative Arts 1850–1950: A Catalogue of the British Museum collection. British Museum Press, London, 1991. ISBN 0714105430
- Cartier 1900–39. British Museum Press, London, 1997. ISBN 0714105848
- Jewellery in the Age of Queen Victoria: A Mirror to the World. British Museum Press, London, 2010. (With Charlotte Gere) ISBN 0714128198
