= Jean-Baptiste Gilles =

French painter (1680–1762)

Jean-Baptiste Gilles (or Gille; 1680–1762), known as Colson, was a French painter of portraits in miniature and water-colours. He was born at Verdun, Three Bishoprics. He assumed his mother's surname of Colson, because the theatres of the fairs had brought ridicule upon the name of Gilles. Colson, who was a pupil of Christophe, and a member of the Academy of St. Luke, died in Paris in 1762.
