= Clemente Bocciardo =

Italian painter (1620–1658)

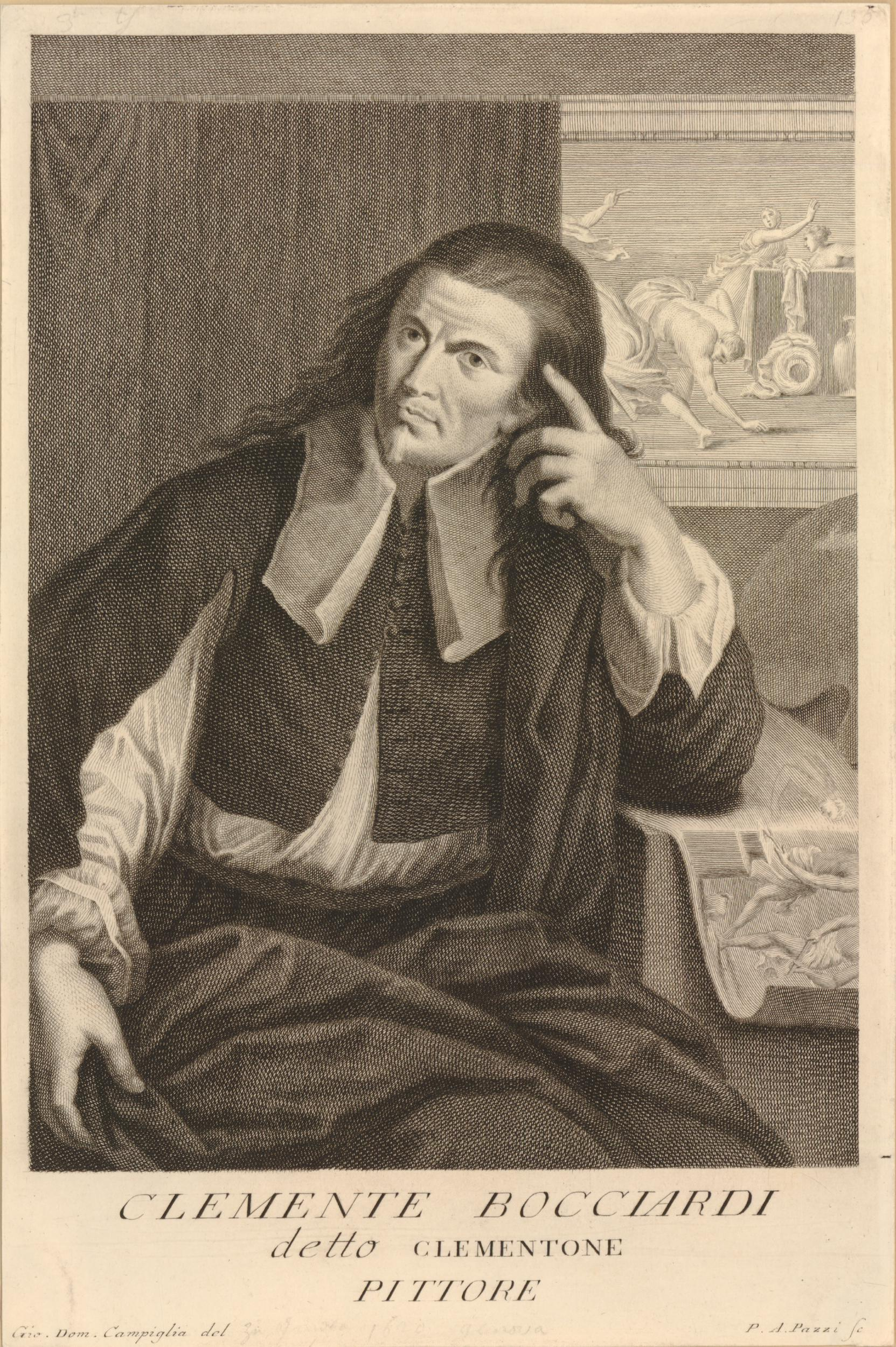
Portrait of Clemente Bocciardo by Giovanni Domenico Campiglia

Clemente Bocciardo (1620–1658) was an Italian painter of the Baroque. He was born in Genoa. He was also called Clementone because of his large size. He painted a Martyrdom of St. Sebastian for the church of the Carthusians in Pisa. He also painted in Florence.

== Life and work ==
He was born in Genoa in 1620. He was a pupil of Bernardo Strozzi, but he left his city very young to complete his education, together with Giovanni Benedetto Castiglione, first in Rome then in Florence. In Genoa, where he painted, according to Ratti, a Last Supper for the oratory of St. Germano (later in Santa Maria della Pietà) and a Corpus Domini for the church of St. Andrea, nothing remains of his work. Leaving Florence, at least from 1639 he stayed in Pisa, where he died in 1658.

He executed Baptist (signed and dated 1639) in the Del Pozzo chapel in Camposanto. One of the first works painted in Pisa was St. Carlo Borromeo in St. Frediano, and Madonna and Saints in the church of St. Matteo. Dispersed are two paintings with the Saints Peter and Paul, who were still in the cathedral in 1912 over the little porticoes leading to the terrace of the relics, a canvas with St. Benedetto on the high altar of the church of the same name (now deconsecrated), St. Sebastiano in Charterhouse, an Immaculate Conception in the church of the Santa Croce in Fossabanda.

Some works, now dispersed, were in churches of Brescia. In Santa Maria delle Grazie, an altarpiece with St. Ignatius. The 17th-century antiquarian G. A. Averoldi (Le scelte pitture di Brescia, Brescia 1700) cited an altarpiece with Madonna with Saints Michael and Anthony, in the church of Saints Faustinus and Jovita.

The Strozzi school did not have a decisive impact in the pictorial formation of Bocciardo, perhaps one that was just indicative. Having chosen, on his pilgrimage to Rome and Florence, an itinerary so divergent from the master, he rather developed his interest in the novelties brought from Rome, where he had been among the admirers of Caravaggio. In fact, he spent a short time in Florence, where the competition was still strong, before ending up settling permanently in Pisa, where he acquired fame and important commissions.
