= Domenico Bocciardo =

Italian painter (c. 1680–1746)

Domenico Bocciardo (c. 1680–1746) was an Italian painter of the Baroque period, active in Genoa. Native of Finale Ligure, but died in Genoa. He was a pupil of Giovanni Maria Morandi in Rome, but upon the death of Morandi in 1717, went to Genoa to work. He painted a San Giovanni baptizing the Multitude for the church of San Paolo in Genoa.

== Life and work ==
He was born in 1686 in an old and wealthy family of Finale Marina.

Of his father Sebastiano, a sculptor and architect, only two works were known in Finale: the triumphal arch erected in honor of the passage of Margaret of Spain and a statue of the Immaculate Conception now in the sacristy of the parish church.

Bocciardo was sent by his father to Rome to study at the school of M. Morandi, where he remained until his master's death in 1717. In a brief period of permanence at Finale he painted the great painting of the Virgin and Saints for the cathedral. He then settled in Genoa, where he obtained credit as an author of portraits and chamber paintings. Soprani recalled from this period: a portrait of Doge Canevaro, a portrait of Nicoletta De Mari, and also St. John Baptizing the Crowd for the church, now disappeared, of St. Paolo in Campetto; a canvas with Dominican Saints for the church of St. Domenico, also destroyed, and a Flagellation for St. Stefano.

At the Genoese permanence Bocciardo alternated periods not easily datable of industriousness in the churches of the Riviera: in Porto Maurizio he painted the Transit of St. Joseph for the church of St. Leonardo and Tobia, who Buries the Dead for the Oratorio della Buona Morte; in Oneglia he made his masterpiece in the large painting dedicated to St. Biagio in the church of the same name; he executed St. Filippo Neri in Albenga in the church of the Fathers of the Pious Schools; at Finale Marina, in the basilica of St. Giovanni Battista, he painted ancona of St. Ermete; in the parish church of Vado a canvas with the Guardian Angel and another with the Presentation of Mary to the Temple. Ratti reports that his works appealed to foreigners and some were exported to America.

He died in 1746 in Genoa, where he was buried in the church of St. Donato.
