= Juan Antonio García de Bouzas =

Spanish painter

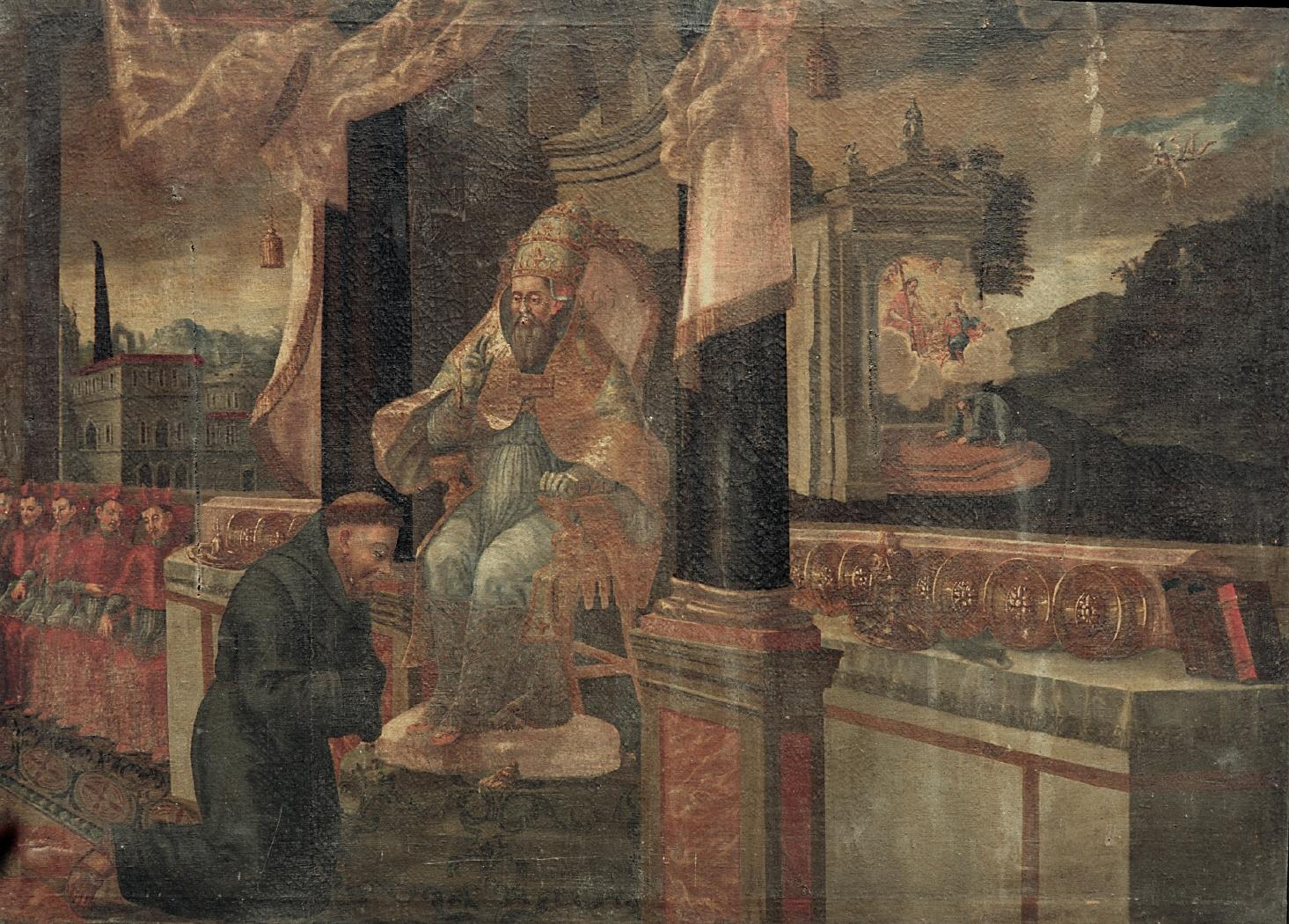
Approval of the Franciscan Order by Juan Antonio Bouzas, Oil on canvas, 170 x 234 cm, Ourense Provincial Archaeological Museum

Juan Antonio Bouzas (also spelled García Bouzas; c. 1680 – 23 May 1755) was a Spanish painter of the Baroque period. He was born at Santiago de Compostela. He was a pupil of Luca Giordano at Madrid. The troubles occasioned by the war of the succession obliged him to withdraw himself from Madrid, and he returned to his native city. His principal works are in the churches at Santiago. In the cathedral is a picture of St. Paul and St. Andrew, and in the convent of the Dominicans are two altar-pieces by him. He painted easel pictures which bear a resemblance to those of his master.
