= Candido Vitali =

Italian painter

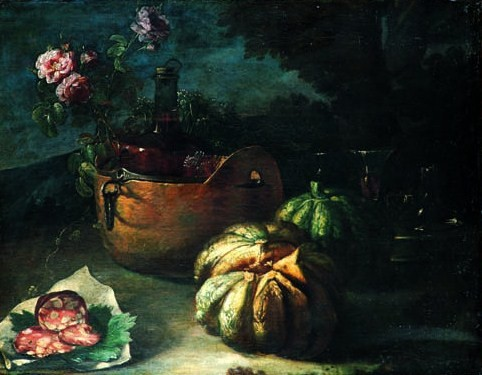
Still life with bronze bowl, bottle, glasses, flowers, salami and melon by Candido Vitali, private collection

Candido Vitali (1680–1753) was an Italian painter of the late Baroque period. He was born in Bologna, Papal States. He trained under Cignani and devoted himself to painting still lifes of animals, birds, flower, and fruit.
