= Lars Gallenius =

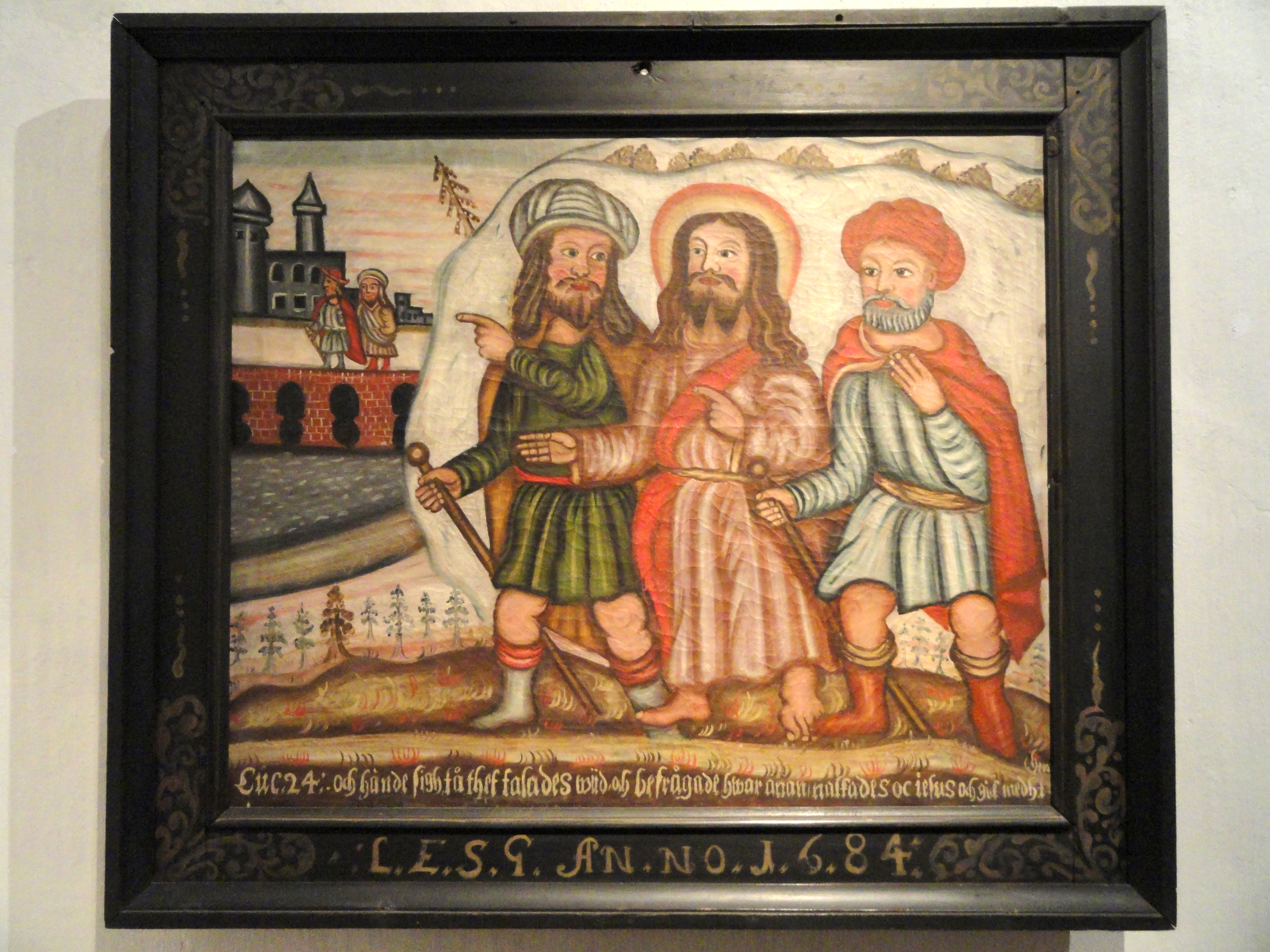
On the Road to Emmaus by Lars Gallenius, originally from the Raahe Church, now resides National Museum of Finland, 1684

Lars Gallenius (circa 1658 Oulu – 25 March 1753 Jakobstad) was a Finnish painter who lived in what was then Sweden.

He was the first "free art person" in Finland. He received the bourgeois rights of the city of Oulu for painting in 1688. He primarily painted religious-themed murals and altarpieces for churches, and traveled the country looking for work. He executed wooden paintings for the Tornio church in 1684, the Hailuoto church in 1690, altarpieces for the Sotkamo church in 1719, wood paintings for the Haapajärvi church in 1747. Gallenius married Catharina Lundinus in 1690, and they had a son James. He died in Jakobstad.
