= 1633 in art =

Events from the year 1633 in art.

== Works ==
- Pieter Brueghel the Younger
  - Spring
  - Winter
- Guercino - Venus, Cupid and Mars
- Jacob Jordaens – The Golden Apple of Discord at the wedding of Peleus and Thetis
- Hubert Le Sueur – Equestrian statue of Charles I (subsequently erected at Charing Cross, London)

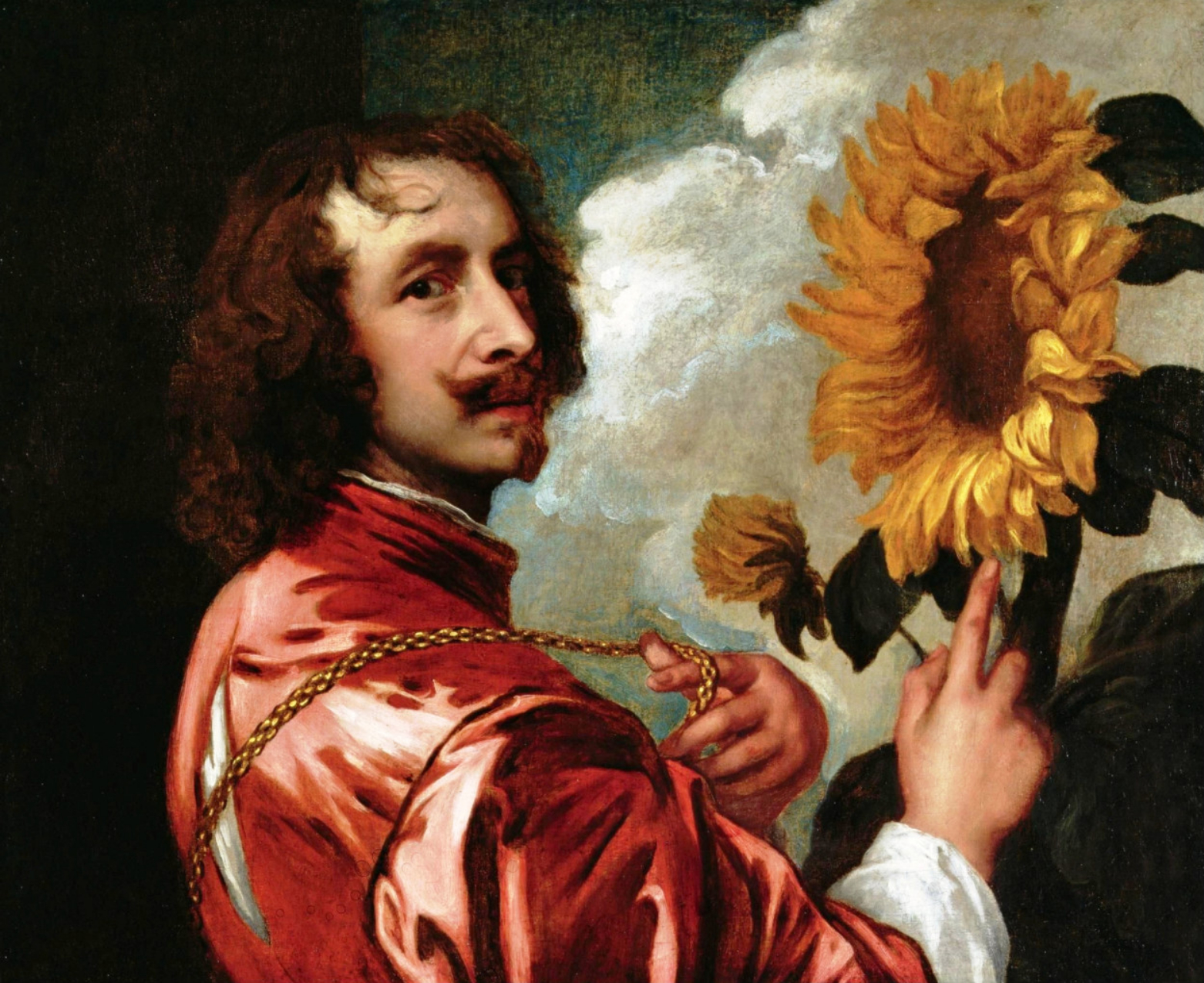
Anthony van Dyck, Self-portrait with a Sunflower

- Claude Lorrain
  - Coast View
  - Landscape with the Judgment of Paris
- Rembrandt
  - Portrait of a Man Rising from His Chair
  - Portrait of a Young Woman with a Fan
  - The Shipbuilder and his Wife
  - The Storm on the Sea of Galilee
  - The Vision of Zacharias in the Temple
- Sebastian Stoskopff
  - The Five Senses, or Summer
- Anthony van Dyck
  - Charles I with M. de St Antoine
  - Self-portrait with a Sunflower
  - Venetia Digby on her Death Bed

== Births ==
- February 20 - Jan de Baen, Dutch portrait painter (died 1702)
- March 26 (bapt.) - Mary Beale, English portrait painter (died 1699)
- April - Willem Drost, Dutch painter and printmaker (died 1659)
- December - Willem van de Velde the Younger, painter (died 1707)
- date unknown
  - Agostino Bonisoli, Italian painter, active mainly in Cremona (died 1700)
  - Dirck Helmbreker, Dutch Golden Age painter and draughtsman (died 1696)
  - Emilio Taruffi, Italian painter of canvases and altarpieces, assassinated (died 1696)
  - Yun Shouping, Chinese painter of the Qing dynasty (died 1690)
- probable
  - Hendrick Fromantiou, Dutch still life painter (died c.1693)
  - Jacob Huysmans, Flemish portrait painter (died 1696)

== Deaths ==
- February - Roelant Savery, Flanders-born Dutch baroque painter of the Golden Age (died 1576)
- April - Pieter Lastman, Dutch painter (born 1583)
- October - Jean LeClerc, painter (born c.1587)
- October 2 - Scipione Borghese, art collector (born 1576)
- November 3 - Lucio Massari, Italian painter of the School of Bologna (born 1569)
- December 18 - Theodoor Galle, Flemish engraver (born 1571)
- December 29 - Cornelis Claesz van Wieringen, Dutch marine painter (born 1580)
- date unknown
  - Alessandro Bardelli, Italian painter (born 1583)
  - Miquel Bestard, Spanish painter from Mallorca (born 1592)
  - Boetius à Bolswert, Dutch painter (born 1585)
  - Juan de Peñalosa, Spanish painter of altarpieces, a priest and poet (born 1579)
  - William Segar, portrait painter and officer of arms to the court of Elizabeth I of England (born 1554)
  - Giovanni Valesio, Italian painter and engraver from Bologna (born 1583)
  - Jan de Wael I, Flemish painter of the Baroque period (born 1558)
