= 1566 in art =

List of years in art	(table)
- … 1556; 1557; 1558; 1559; 1560; 1561; 1562; 1563; 1564; 1565; 1566; 1567; 1568; 1569; 1570; 1571; 1572; 1573; 1574; 1575; 1576 …
- Art; Archaeology; Architecture; Literature; Music; Philosophy; Science; +...

Events from the year 1566 in art.

== Events ==
- August 10 - Beeldenstorm: At the end of a pilgrimage from Hondschoote to Steenvoorde, the chapel of the Sint-Laurensklooster is defaced by a crowd. It is the start of a period of several weeks of violent iconoclasm in which paintings and church decorations and fittings are destroyed throughout the Low Countries.
- Pieter Bruegel the Elder begins painting The Massacre of the Innocents (1566-1567).
- Giuseppe Arcimboldo returns to the Italian city-states.
- An epitaph to Elisabeth of Brandenburg, Duchess of Brunswick-Calenberg-Göttingen, designed by Sigmund Linger, is erected in the St. Giles Chapel of the St. John's Church in Schleusingen.

== Paintings ==
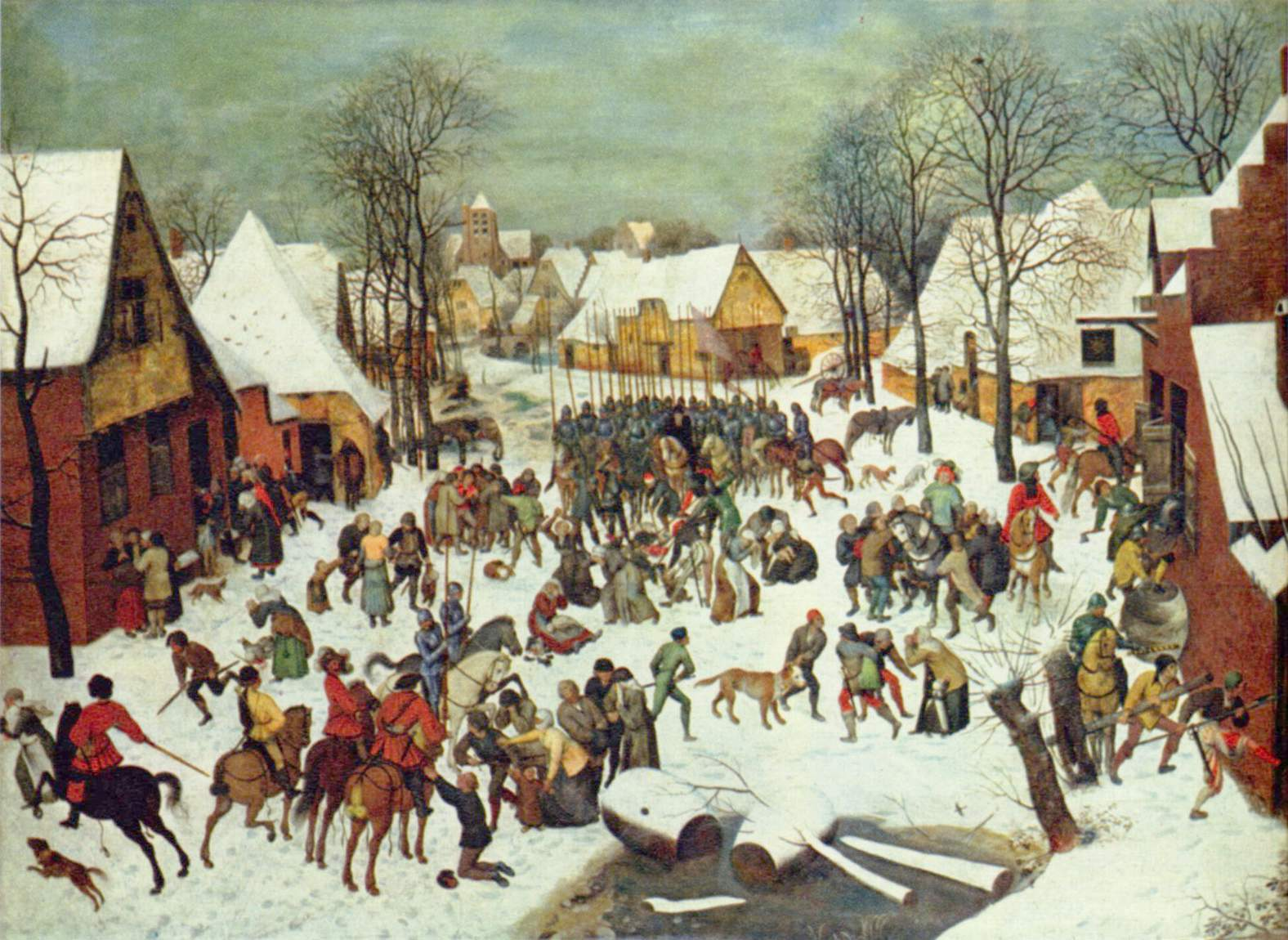
Pieter Bruegel the Elder, The Massacre of the Innocents, c.1566-1567

- Giuseppe Arcimboldo
  - The Jurist
  - The Librarian (approximate date)
  - Water or Fish (The Four Elements; Kunsthistorisches Museum Vienna
- Pieter Bruegel the Elder - The Census at Bethlehem
- Antoine Caron - The Massacres of the Triumvirate
- Hans Eworth - Nicholas Heath, Archbishop of York
- Paolo Veronese - altarpiece of Jesus' baptism, at the cathedral of Lignano Sabbiadoro

== Births ==
- January 15 - Philipp Uffenbach, German painter and etcher (died 1636)
- date unknown
  - Giovanni Baglione, Italian early baroque painter and historian of art (died 1643)
  - Abraham Bloemaert, Dutch painter and printmaker (died 1651)
  - Domenico Carpinoni, Italian painter of primarily religious works (died 1658)
  - Johann Matthias Kager, German painter (died 1634)
  - Santo Peranda, a historical painter of Venice (died 1638)
  - Joachim Wtewael, Dutch painter and engraver (died 1638)

== Deaths ==
- April 4 - Daniele da Volterra, Italian mannerist painter and sculptor (born c.1509)
- April 16 - Juan Correa de Vivar, Spanish Renaissance (Renacimiento) painter (born c.1510)
- August - Lambert Lombard, Flemish Renaissance painter, architect and theorist for the Prince-Bishopric of Liège (born 1505)
- August 4 - Girolamo della Robbia, Italian ceramicist (born 1488)
- date unknown
  - Ahmed Karahisari, Ottoman calligrapher (born 1468)
- probable
  - Niccolò Boldrini, Italian engraver (born c.1500)
  - Girolamo Romanino, Italian painter (born c.1485)
  - Jan Sanders van Hemessen, Flemish Northern Renaissance painter (born c.1500)
