= 1500 in art =

The year 1500 in art involved some significant events and new works.

== Events ==
- 26 July: Bartolomeo di Pagholo ("Baccio della Porta") becomes a Dominican friar.
- Sandro Botticelli begins painting of Adoration of the Christ Child (1500-1510) as a tondo (round painting), oil on panel.

== Works ==
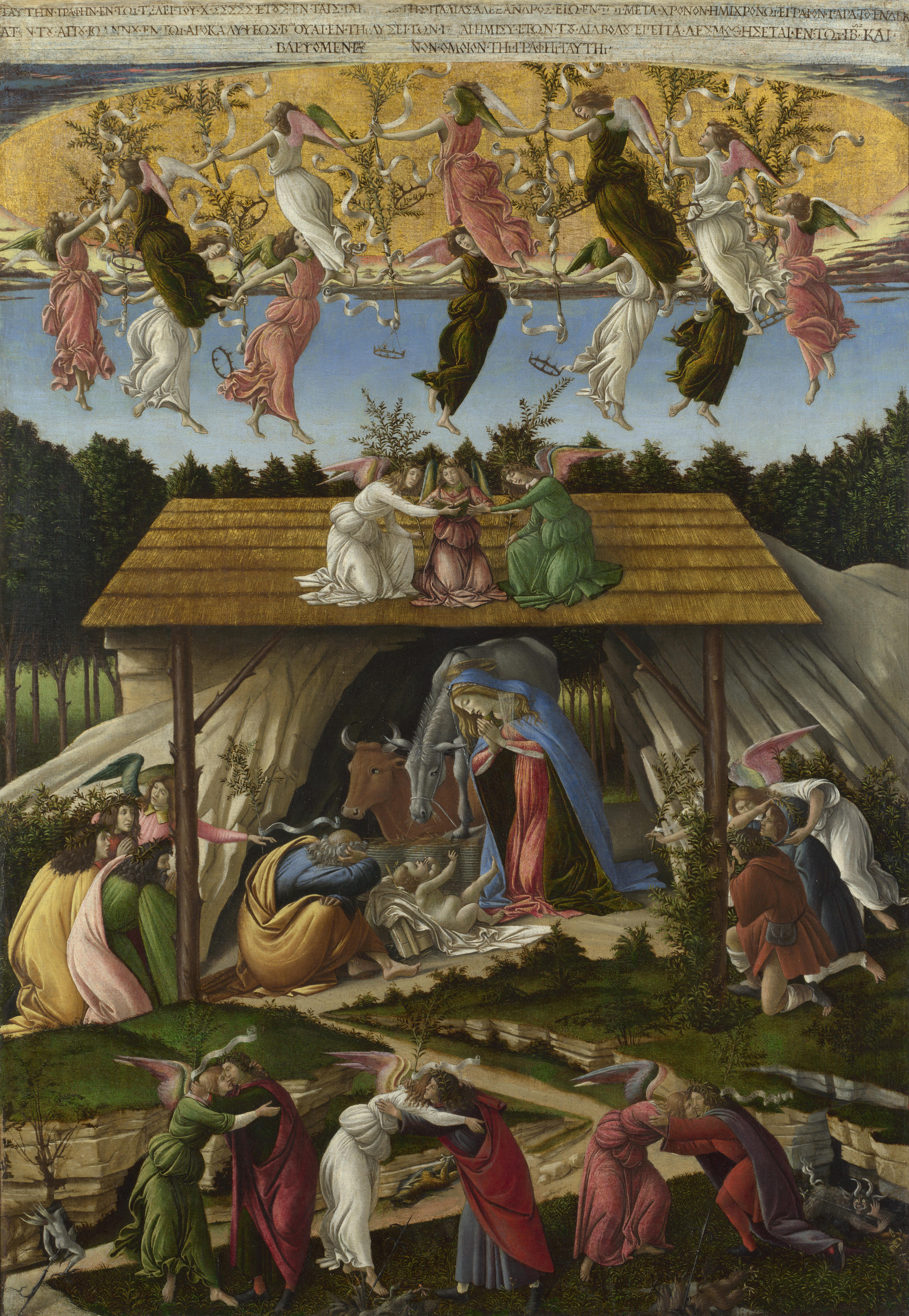
Botticelli, The Mystical Nativity

- Fra Bartolomeo – Annunciation (oil tempera on wood; Uffizi, Florence)
- Sandro Botticelli – The Mystical Nativity (National Gallery, London)
- Cima da Conegliano - Madonna and Child (National Museum Wales)
- Albrecht Dürer
  - Lamentation of Christ (approximate date)
  - Paumgartner altarpiece (approximate date)
  - Self-Portrait
  - Seven Sorrows Polyptych (approximate date)
- Giorgione – Adoration of the Shepherds (approximate completion date)
- Pietro Perugino - Vallombrosa Altarpiece

== Births ==
- 3 November - Benvenuto Cellini, Italian artist (died 1571)
- date unknown
- Hans Sebald Beham, German printmaker, engraver, designer of woodcuts, painter and miniaturist (died 1550)
- Niccolò Boldrini, Italian engraver (died 1566)
  - Pompeo Cesura, Italian painter and engraver (died 1571)
  - Jean Chartier, French painter, draughtsman, printer and publisher (died 1580)
  - Pieter Claeissens the Elder, Flemish painter (died 1576)
  - Jean Cousin the Elder, French painter, sculptor, etcher, engraver, and geometrician (died 1593)
  - Juan Vicente Macip (or Vicente Joanes Masip), Spanish painter of the Renaissance period (died 1579)
  - Alessandro Oliverio, Italian painter (died 1544)
  - Niccolò Tribolo, Italian Mannerist artist (died 1550)
- approximate year of birth
  - Girolamo Mazzola Bedoli, Italian painter of the Parmesan School of Painting (died 1569)
  - Domenico Campagnola, Italian painter and engraver of the Renaissance period (died 1564); he was a pupil of his father, the painter Giulio Campagnola
  - Jean Mone, German-Flemish sculptor (died 1548)
  - Luca Penni, Italian painter, member of the School of Fontainebleau (died 1556)
  - Georg Pencz, German engraver, painter and printmaker (died 1550)
  - Ligier Richier, French sculptor (died 1567)
  - Jan van Amstel, Dutch Northern Renaissance painter (died 1542)
  - Jan Sanders van Hemessen, Flemish Northern Renaissance painter (died 1566)

== Deaths ==
- date unknown
  - Antonio del Rincón, Spanish painter and artist (born 1446)
  - Neroccio di Bartolomeo de' Landi, Italian painter and sculptor (born 1447)
  - Friedrich Herlin, German painter (born c.1425)
  - Bernardo Tesauro, Neapolitan fresco painter (born 1440)
