= 1592 in art =

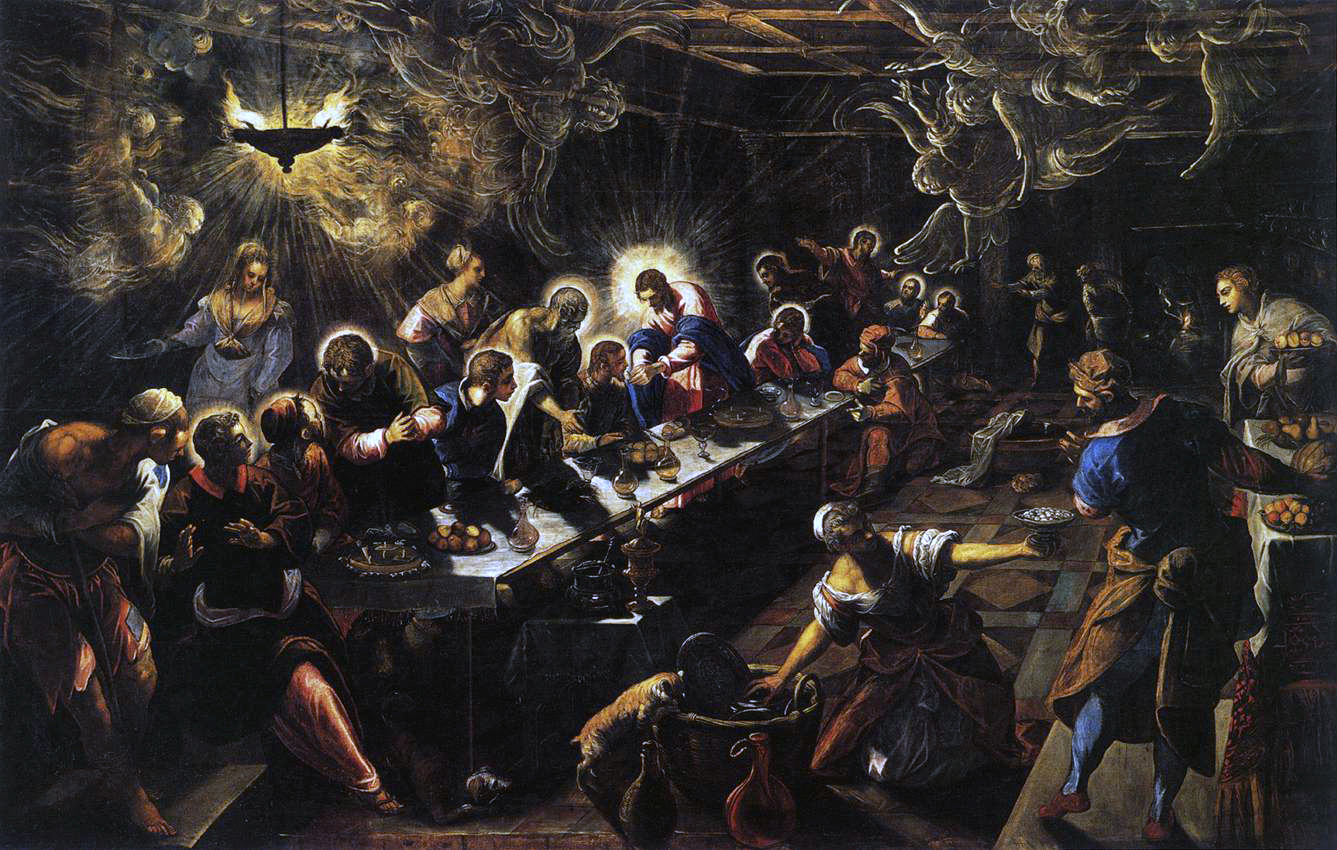
Tintoretto, the Last Supper fresco

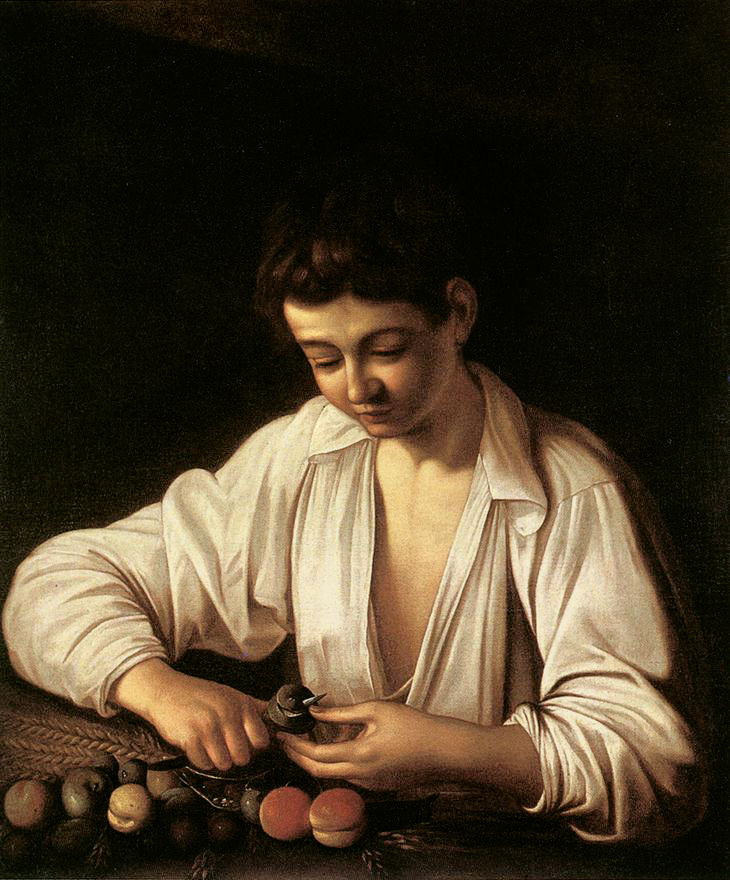
Caravaggio, Boy Peeling Fruit

Events from the year 1592 in art.

== Events ==
- Giulio Mancini comes to Rome and quickly builds a brilliant medical career, eventually becoming personal physician to Pope Urban VIII; while there, he becomes a discerning art collector.

== Works ==
- Caravaggio – Boy Peeling Fruit
- Annibale Carracci
  - helps complete (along with brothers) Founding of Rome frescoes in Palazzo Magnani, Bologna
  - Assumption for Bonasoni chapel in church of San Francesco
  - The Madonna of Bologna for chapel of Caprara Palace (Christ Church Picture Gallery, Oxford; approximate date)
  - The Virgin Appears to the Saints Luke and Catherine (Musée du Louvre, Paris)
- Giuseppe Cesari – Cappella Olgiati in Santa Prassede, Rome
- Hendrik Goltzius – engravings of the Muses
- Marcus Gheeraerts the Younger - The Ditchley Portrait (approx.)
- Tintoretto – begins Last Supper fresco (San Giorgio Maggiore, Venice; completed in 1594)

== Births ==
- February 23 - Balthazar Gerbier, Dutch art advisor and designer at the English court (died 1663)
- March 20 – Giovanni da San Giovanni, Italian painter (died 1636)
- September 5 – Jacopo Vignali, Florentine painter (died 1664)
- October 30 - Giulio Benso, Genovese painter (died 1668)
- November 4 - Gerard van Honthorst, Dutch painter of Utrecht (died 1656)
- date unknown
  - Miquel Bestard, Spanish painter from Mallorca (died 1633)
  - Jacques Callot, printmaker and draughtsman from Lorraine (died 1635)
  - Ingen, Chinese Linji Chán Buddhist monk, poet, and calligrapher (died 1673)
  - Claes Corneliszoon Moeyaert, Catholic Dutch painter (died 1655)
  - Giacomo Rocca, Italian painter (died 1605)
  - Peter Snayers, Flemish battlefield painter (died 1666 or 1667)
  - Wang Duo, Chinese calligrapher and painter of the Ming Dynasty (died 1652)
- probable
  - Jacob Pynas, Dutch painter (died 1650)
  - Wang Shimin, Chinese landscape painter during the Qing dynasty (died 1680)
  - Shao Mi, Chinese landscape painter, calligrapher, and poet during the Ming Dynasty (died 1642)

== Deaths ==
- February 13 – Jacopo Bassano, Italian landscape and genre painter (born 1510)
- February 23 - Natale Bonifacio, engraver and producer of woodcuts (born 1537/1538)
- March 5 – Michael Coxcie, painter (born 1499)
- April 5 - Jerónimo Cosida, Spanish Renaissance painter, sculptor, goldsmith and architect (born 1510)
- April 13 - Bartolomeo Ammanati, architect and sculptor (born 1511)
- May - Dirck Barendsz, Dutch painter who was born and died in Amsterdam (born 1534)
- July 4 - Francesco Bassano the Younger, painter (born 1559)
- date unknown
  - Willem Boy, Flemish painter, sculptor, and architect active in Sweden (born 1520)
  - Alessandro Fei, Italian painter who primarily worked in a Mannerist style (born 1543)
  - David Kandel, Strasbourg-born botanical illustrator (born 1520)
  - Girolamo Muziano, Italian painter (born 1532)
