= 1583 in art =

Events from the year 1583 in art.

== Events ==
- Italian Jesuit painter Giovanni Niccolo is sent to Portuguese Japan to found a painters' seminary.

== Works ==
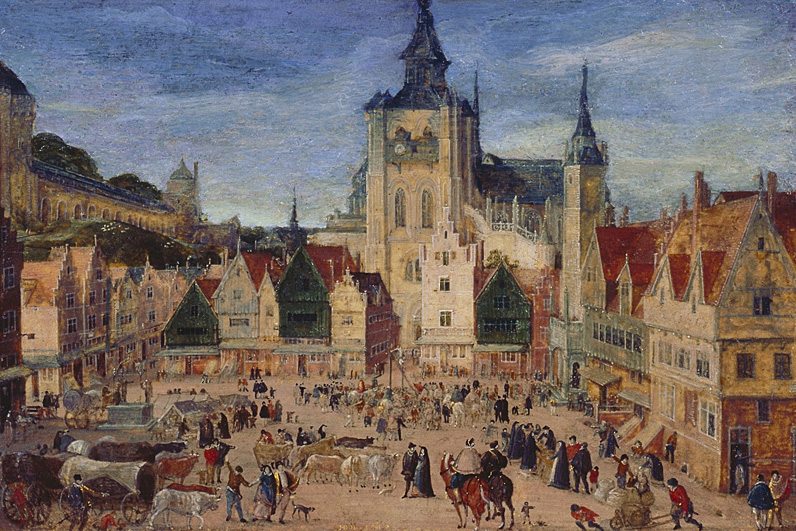
Bol – Grand Place in Bergen

- Bartolomeo Passarotti – The Presentation of the Virgin in the Temple (painted for chapel of Gabella Grossa, Bologna; now in Pinacotheca there)
- Annibale Carracci – Crucifixion
- Lavinia Fontana – Newborn Baby in a Crib (approximate date)
- Joseph Heintz – Venus and Adonis
- Quentin Metsys the Younger – The Sieve Portrait of Queen Elizabeth I of England

== Sculptures ==
- Giambologna – Venus After the Bath
- Germain Pilon – Effigies of King Henry II of France and Catherine de' Medici in coronation dress

== Births ==
- date unknown
  - Alessandro Bardelli, Italian painter (died 1633)
  - Paolo Biancucci, Italian painter primarily of religious scenes (died 1653)
  - Antonio Carracci, Italian painter (died 1618)
  - Nicolaes de Giselaer, Dutch painter and draughtsman (died 1654)
  - Pieter Lastman, Dutch painter (died 1633)
  - Juan de Mesa, Spanish sculptor (died 1627)
  - Miyamoto Musashi, Japanese swordsman, calligrapher and painter (died 1645)
  - Astolfo Petrazzi, Italian painter, active mainly in his native Siena (died 1653/1665)
  - Giovanni Valesio, Italian painter and engraver from Bologna (died 1633)
  - Hendrik van der Borcht the elder, engraver (died 1651)
- probable
  - Hendrik Goudt, Dutch painter (died 1648)
  - Jan Porcellis, Dutch marine artist (died 1632)
  - Jan Pynas, Dutch Baroque painter (died 1631)

== Deaths ==
- March 24 - Hubert Goltzius, Dutch painter, engraver and printer (born 1526)
- June 8 - Matthijs Bril, landscape fresco painter who worked in Rome (born 1550)
- October 30 – Pirro Ligorio, Italian architect, painter, antiquarian and garden designer (born 1510)
- December 23 – Nicolás Factor, Spanish painter (born 1520)
- date unknown
  - Orazio Alfani, Italian painter (born 1510)
  - Lorenzo Costa the Younger, Italian painter (born 1537)
  - Wen Jia, Chinese painter of landscapes and flowers (born 1501)
  - Marco Pino, Italian painter of the Renaissance and Mannerist period (born 1521)
  - Martino Rota, engraver and printmaker (born 1520)
- probable
  - Jean Court, enamel painter (born 1511)
  - Melchior Lorck, painter, draughtsman, and printmaker of Danish-German origin (born 1526/1527)
