= 1510 in art =

Events from the year 1510 in art.

== Events ==
- Giulio Campagnola invents the technique of stippling in engraving

== Works ==
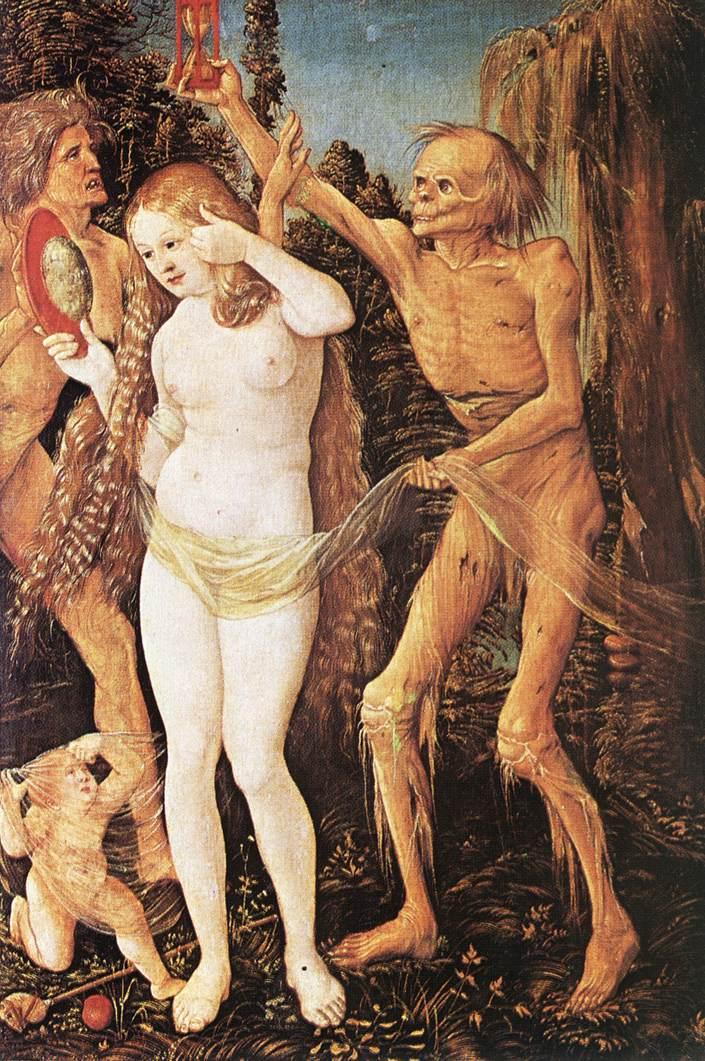
Baldung – Three Ages of the Woman and the Death, Kunsthistorisches Museum

- Albrecht Altdorfer – St. George in the Forest
- Hans Baldung – Three Ages of the Woman and the Death
- Francesco Bianchi (attrib.) – Arion riding on a Dolphin (c. 1509–1510, Ashmolean Museum, Oxford)
- Sandro Botticelli – Adoration of the Christ Child (1500–1510, tondo (round painting), oil on panel)
- Vittore Carpaccio – Young Knight in a Landscape
- Girolamo Genga – The Abduction of Helen
- Giorgione (probably completed after Giorgione's death this year by Titian) – Sleeping Venus
- Lucas van Leyden – The Milkmaid (copper engraving)

== Births ==
- Orazio Alfani, Italian painter of the Renaissance (died 1583)
- Mir Sayyid Ali, Persian illustrator and painter (died 1572)
- Jacopo Bassano, Italian landscape and genre painter (died 1592)
- Hans Besser, German Renaissance portrait painter (died unknown)
- Hans Bocksberger der Ältere, Austrian painter (died 1561)
- Jörg Breu the Younger, German painter, son of Jörg Breu the Elder (died 1547)
- François Clouet, French Renaissance miniaturist and painter (died 1572)
- Hieronymus Cock, Flemish painter and etcher of the Northern Renaissance (died 1570)
- Juan Correa de Vivar, painted at the height of the Spanish Renaissance (Renacimiento) (died 1566) [in Spanish: Juan Correa de Vivar]
- Jerónimo Cosida, Spanish Renaissance painter, sculptor, goldsmith and architect (died 1592)
- Adriaen Pietersz Crabeth, Dutch glass painter (died 1553)
- Wouter Crabeth I, Dutch glass painter (died 1590)
- Francesco de' Rossi (Il Salviati), Italian Mannerist painter from Florence (died 1562)
- Jacopino del Conte, Italian Mannerist painter (died 1598)
- Jacques I Androuet du Cerceau, architect, sculptor, designer (died 1584)
- Antonio Fantuzzi, Italian etcher (died 1550)
- Jean Goujon, French sculptor and architect during the French Renaissance (died 1572)
- Pirro Ligorio, Italian architect, painter, antiquarian and garden designer (died 1583)
- Herri met de Bles, Flemish Northern Renaissance and Mannerist landscape painter (died 1555/1560)
- Filippo Negroli, Italian armourer (died 1579)
- Giuseppe Niccolo Vicentino, Italian painter and wood-engraver of the Renaissance (d. unknown)
- Bernard Palissy, French potter and craftsman (died 1589)
- Battista Franco Veneziano, Italian Mannerist painter and printmaker in etching (died 1561)
- (born 1510/1515): Andrea Schiavone, Renaissance etcher and painter, active mainly in Venice (died 1563)
- (born 1510/1520): Levina Teerlinc, Flemish miniaturist who served as a painter to the English court (died 1576)

== Deaths ==
- By October - Giorgione, Venetian painter (born c. 1477–78) (plague)
- Sandro Botticelli, Italian painter of the Florentine school during the Early Renaissance (Quattrocento) (born 1445)
- Bernardino Zaganelli, Italian Renaissance painter (born 1460-1470)
