= 1562 in art =

Events from the year 1562 in art.

== Events ==
- In Venice, sumptuary laws decree that all gondolas must be painted black to prevent lavish displays of wealth.
- Giorgio Vasari, who had begun work on the Uffizi in Florence in 1560, founds the Academy of Design.
- Paolo Veronese begins painting The Wedding at Cana (1562-1563).
- The Medici court astronomer Fra Ignazio Danti paints maps at the Palazzo Vecchio.
- Tintoretto begins the three paintings of the miracles of St. Mark (1562–66) for the Scuola di San Marco.
- Flemish artist Hieronymus Cock and Spanish cartographer Diego Gutiérrez produce the map Americae Sive Quartae Orbis Partis Nova Et Exactissima Descriptio.

== Paintings ==
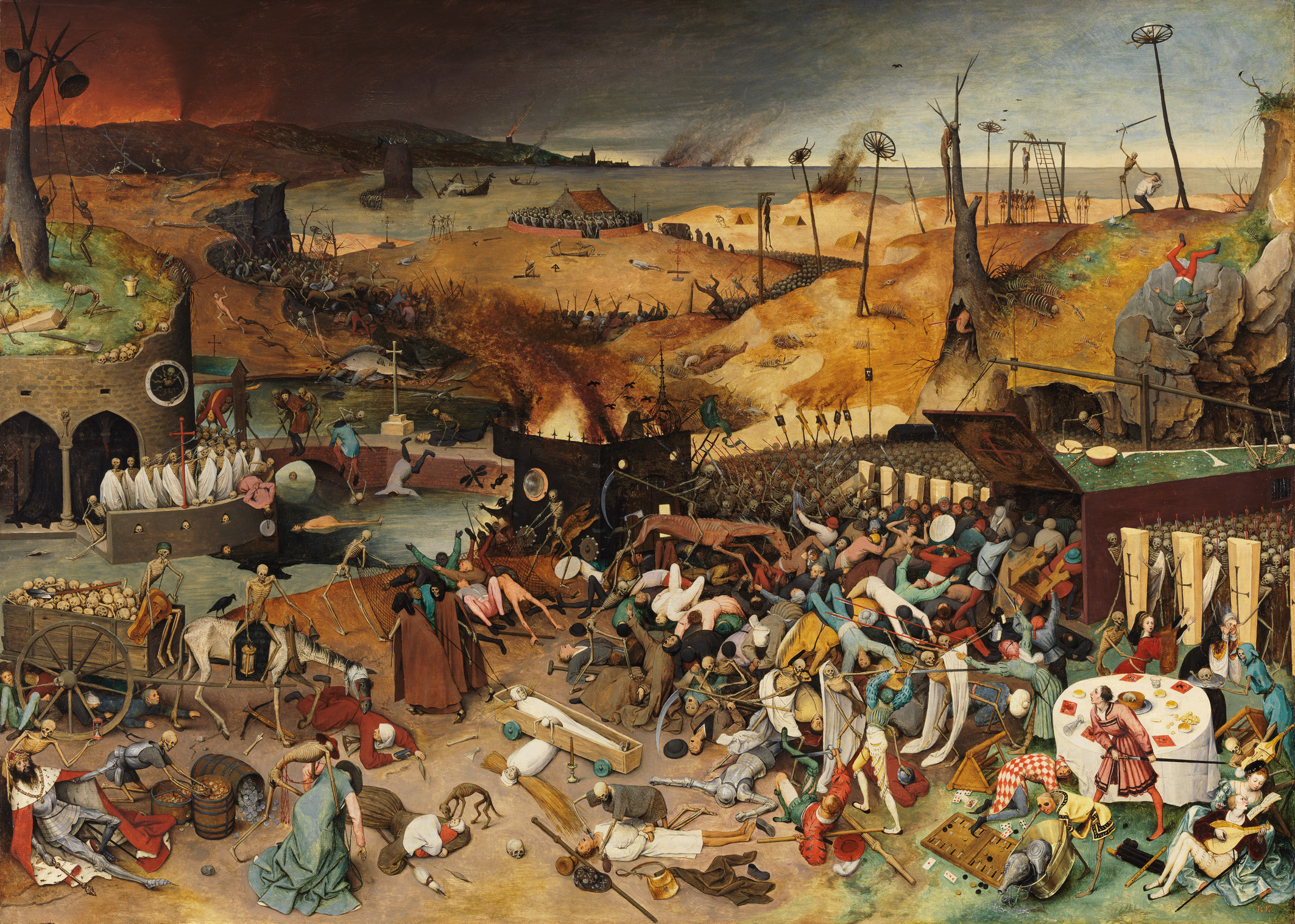
Pieter Brueghel the Elder, The Triumph of Death (c.1562) in the Museo del Prado, Madrid

- Pieter Brueghel the Elder paints The Triumph of Death and Dull Gret, both strongly influenced by the style of Hieronymus Bosch.
- Frans Floris paints The Sacrifice of Jesus Christ, Son of God, Gathering and Protecting Mankind (Allegory of the Trinity).
- Lattanzio Gambara paints frescos.
- Titian paints The Death of Actaeon (National Gallery, London; approximate date) and The Rape of Europa (Isabella Stewart Gardner Museum, Boston).
- Ludger Tom Ring the Younger paints a pair of upright pictures of iris and lilies.

== Births ==
- May 6 - Pietro Bernini, Italian sculptor and father of the more famous Gianlorenzo Bernini (died 1629)
- date unknown
  - Fabrizio Castello, Italian painter of Genoese origin settled in Spain (died 1617)
  - Jerónimo Rodriguez de Espinosa, Spanish painter of the Renaissance period (died 1630)
  - Pietro Faccini, Italian painter in styles bridging Mannerism and the nascent Baroque (died 1602/1614)
  - Cornelis van Haarlem, Dutch painter and draughtsman, was one of the leading Mannerist artists in The Netherlands (died 1638)
  - Hendrick Cornelisz Vroom, Dutch painter (died 1640), father of reverse-named painter Cornelis Hendriksz Vroom (1591-1661)

== Deaths ==
- August 1 - Virgil Solis, German draughtsman and printmaker in engraving, etching and woodcut (born 1514)
- November 11 - Francesco de' Rossi ("Il Salviati"), Florentine Mannerist painter (born 1510)
- December 6 - Jan van Scorel, Dutch painter credited with the introduction of High Italian Renaissance art to the Netherlands (born 1495)
- date unknown
  - Francesco del Prato, Italian still-life painter and goldsmith (born unknown)
  - Jean Duvet, French Renaissance goldsmith and engraver (born 1485)
  - Francesco Torbido, Italian painter (born 1486)
