= San Francesco, Pescia =

Roman Catholic church in Tuscany, Italy

Coordinates: 43.905°N 10.691°E

San Francesco is a Romanesque and Gothic-style, Roman Catholic church located at Piazza San Francesco in Pescia, region of Tuscany, Italy.

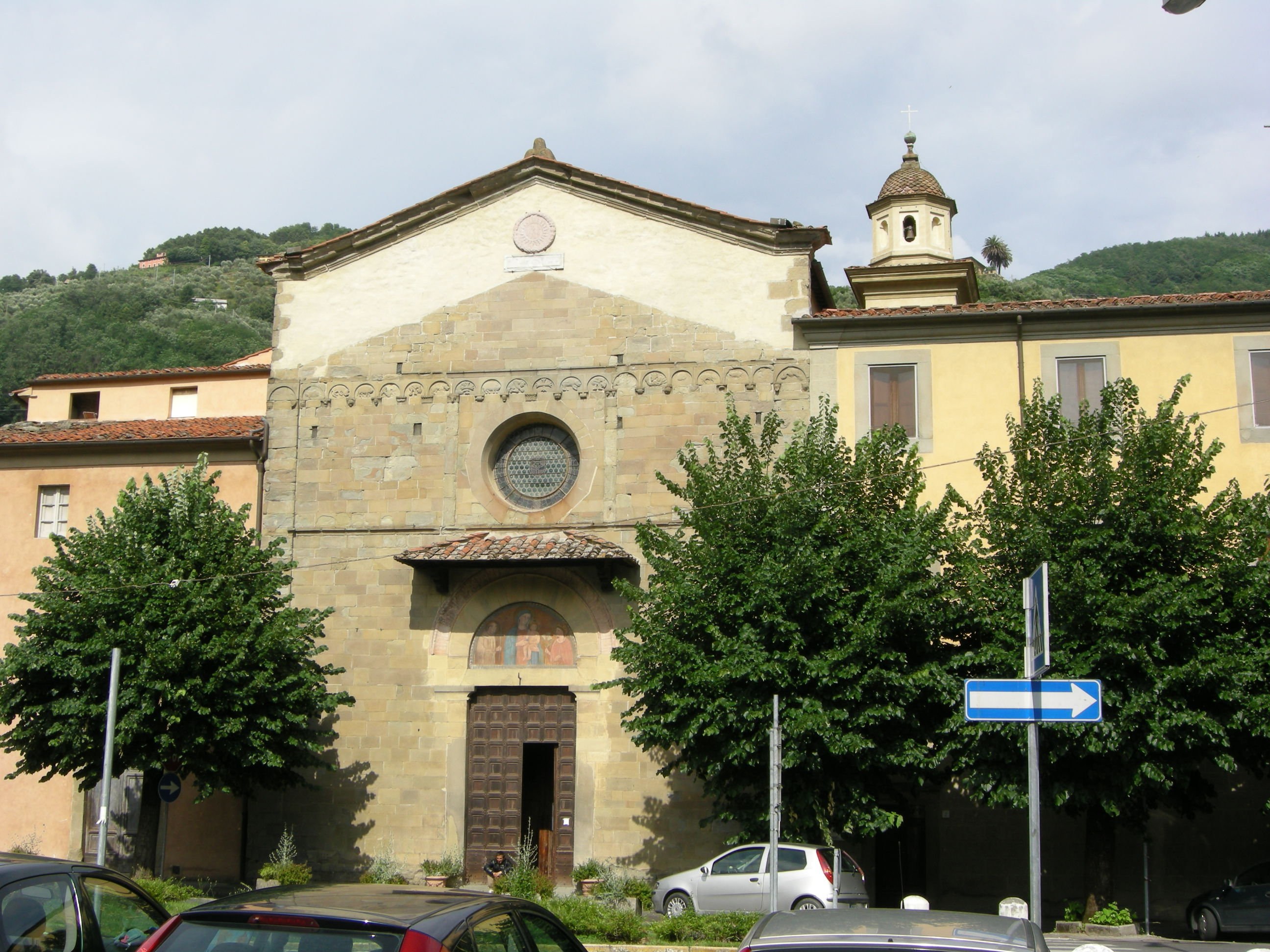
Facade and exterior

== History ==
Tradition holds that in 1211, St Francis, stayed three days in the house of Venanzio Orlandi which was located on the via dei Forni. Orlandi prior to the century, in turn built an oratory at the site where the tribune of this church stands. Construction of the church began circa 1295 and continued for decades. The oratory was enlarged into a church with an adjacent convent, and prominent families of the town added their chapels over the years. The church and convent were suppressed in 1810. The church was restored in 1911 to 1930.

In 1328, representatives of the Guelph communities of the Valdinievole and Florentine Valeriana, joined in a league to oppose the Ghibelline city of Lucca. This league would lead to the annexation of the territory in 1339 to Florence.

== Interior ==
The church has a single nave with a number of altarpieces including one by Alessandro Bardelli. In the chapel of the Misericordia is a 15th-century wooden sculptural group of the Virgin and Child. In 1506, the icon is said to have performed miracles, leading to the foundation of the Confraternity or Compagnia di Misericordia associated with the church of Santi Stefano e Niccolao in Pescia.

To the right of the main altar is the chapel of St Charles Borromeo with a canvas by Rodomonte di Pasquino Pieri, a pupil of Pietro da Cortona.

The Nucci chapel has frescoes dated to the 1430s attributed to Bicci di Lorenzo. The upper register depicts the Transit of the Virgin.

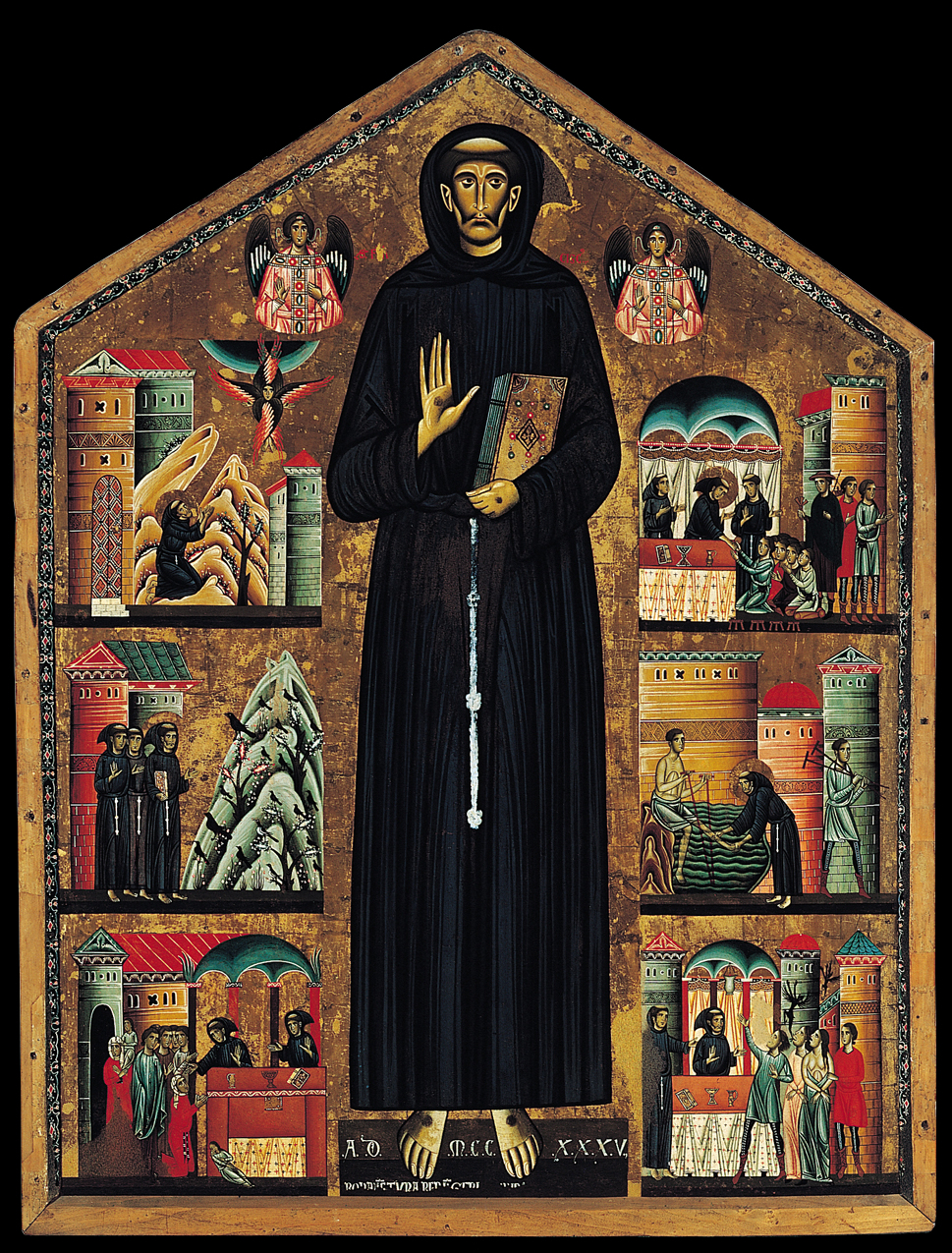
St Francis and his miracles (1235) by Berlinghieri

An inventory of works from 1896, cites that in the first altar on the right was a depiction of a crucifixion attributed to Agnolo Gaddi. In the third altar to the right was tempera painting on wood with an early portrait of St Francis surrounded by a series of scenes depicting his miracles (1235) by Bonaventura Berlinghieri. The altarpiece was completed only about a decade after the saint's death, but the painting has a stylized Byzantine simplicity with gilded background. The painting was restored many times.

In the next chapel, inside the presbytery, was a depiction of the Martyrdom of St Bartholemew by Giovanni Imbert. Another canvas is by Domenico Passignano. The other chapel has a 15th-century triptych depicting the Madonna and Child with Saints Anne, Simon, Thaddeus, Lawrence, and Dominic., some sources attributed the painting to Spinello Aretino.

In the chapel of Sant'Antonio (of Padua), in the apse left of the main altar, are two paintings, one of the Miracle of the Kneeling Mule (wherein a heretic's mule knelt before St Antony administering the eucharist) by Giovanni Martinelli; the other is St Antony resurrects a deceased man, a copy of a work by Lorenzo Pasinelli found in the church of San Francesco, Bologna.

The next chapel was built for the Barba family, by Pompeo Barba, a scholar and doctor, who commissioned a Martyrdom of St Dorothea (1595) by Jacopo Ligozzi. A painting of a Dead Christ has also been attributed to Ligozzi. The chapel also has tombs of the Obizzi family. One wall tomb near the altar of St Dorothea, has the remains of Giovanni degli Obizi, with an engraving of a warrior and dragon. The ceiling has 14th-century frescoes attributed to Antonio Vite.

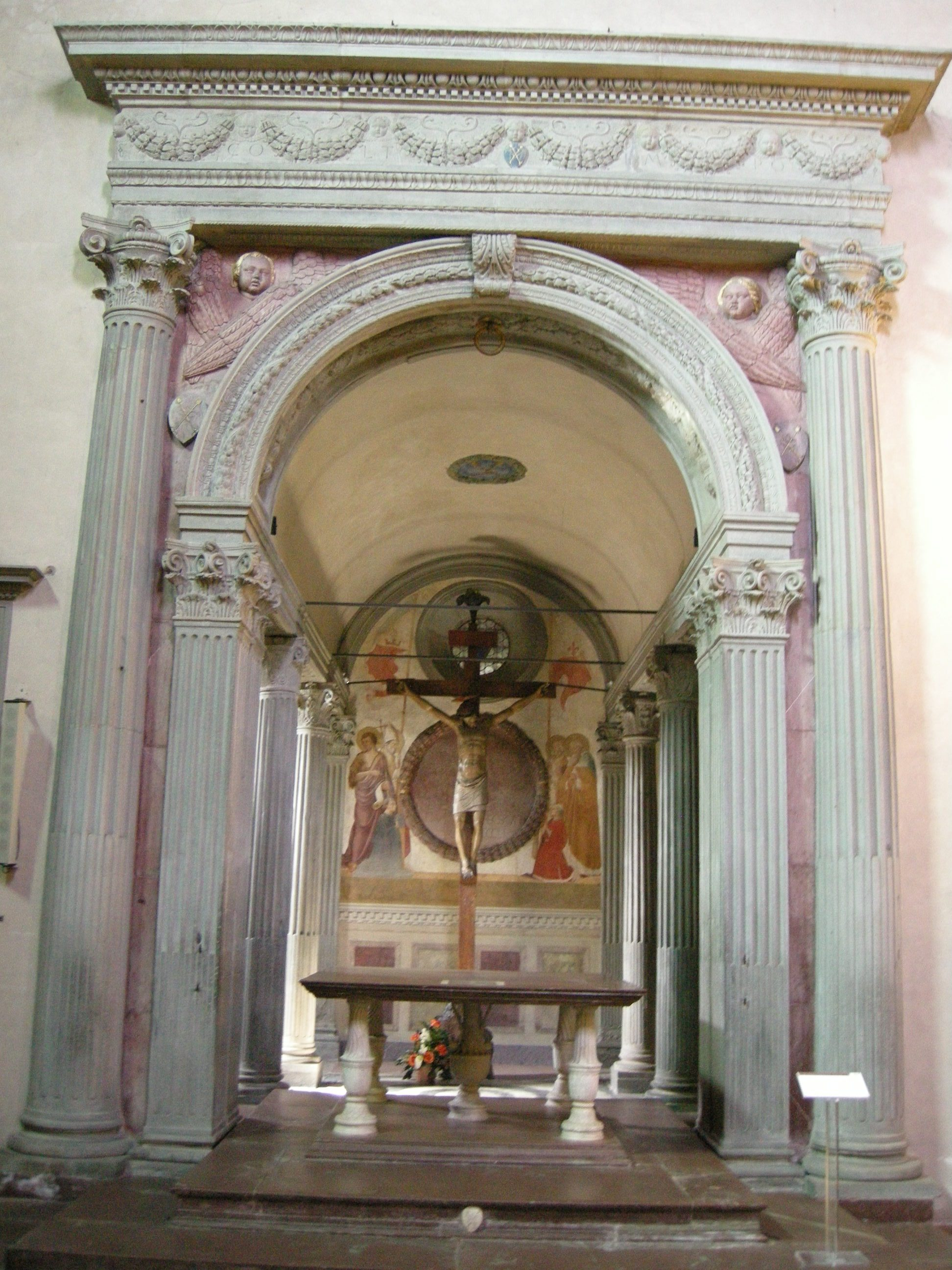
Cappella Orlandi-Cardini

In the apse, the Cardini (or Orlandi-Cardini) chapel is entered through an elegant arch flanked by columns, all in pietra serena; it was designed by Andrea Cavalcanti, a pupil of Brunelleschi, and built in 1451-1458. That chapel houses a venerated 15th century stucco crucifix, called the Crocefisso della Corda Pia, which is said to have been involved in miracles. This chapel was found to have quattrocento-period frescoes, attributed to Neri di Bicci, depicting the brothers Cardini in prayer with the patrons of the town and valley.

In the wall of the sacristy is a fresco depicting the Crucifixion, attributed to Puccio Capanna. The church bell-tower (1718-1719) was designed by Carlo Antonio Arrighi.
