= Jean Chartier =

Jean Chartier may refer to:

- Jean Chartier (chronicler) (c. 1385–1464), chronicler of the life of Charles VII of France
- Jean Chartier (painter) (1500–1580)
