= Ercole Bazzicaluva =

Italian painter

Ercole Bazzicaluva, also spelled Bezzicaluva or Bazzicaluve (active 1640), was an Italian engraver of the Baroque period.

== Biography ==
He was born in Pisa. He was active in Florence from the first half of the 17th century. Dedicating his series of etchings depicting "rare and imaginary lands" to the Grand Duke of Tuscany on October 24,1638, Bazzicaluva declared himself being originated "of Pisa"; but then, in the margins of the first of some engravings of military episodes of 1641, he is called "Florentine" (perhaps because Pisa was part, for more than a century, of the State of Florence). His birth year is unknown. The date of 1600, proposed by De Boni, is unlikely: in 1638 Bazzicaluva described his engravings for the Grand Duke Ferdinando II of Tuscany as "young first fruits" which "like unripe fruits wait to mature", which he would not have said if he had already been 38 years old. It is more likely that he was born around 1610, that is almost at the same time as Della Bella, with whom he shared the school and in a certain sense the style.

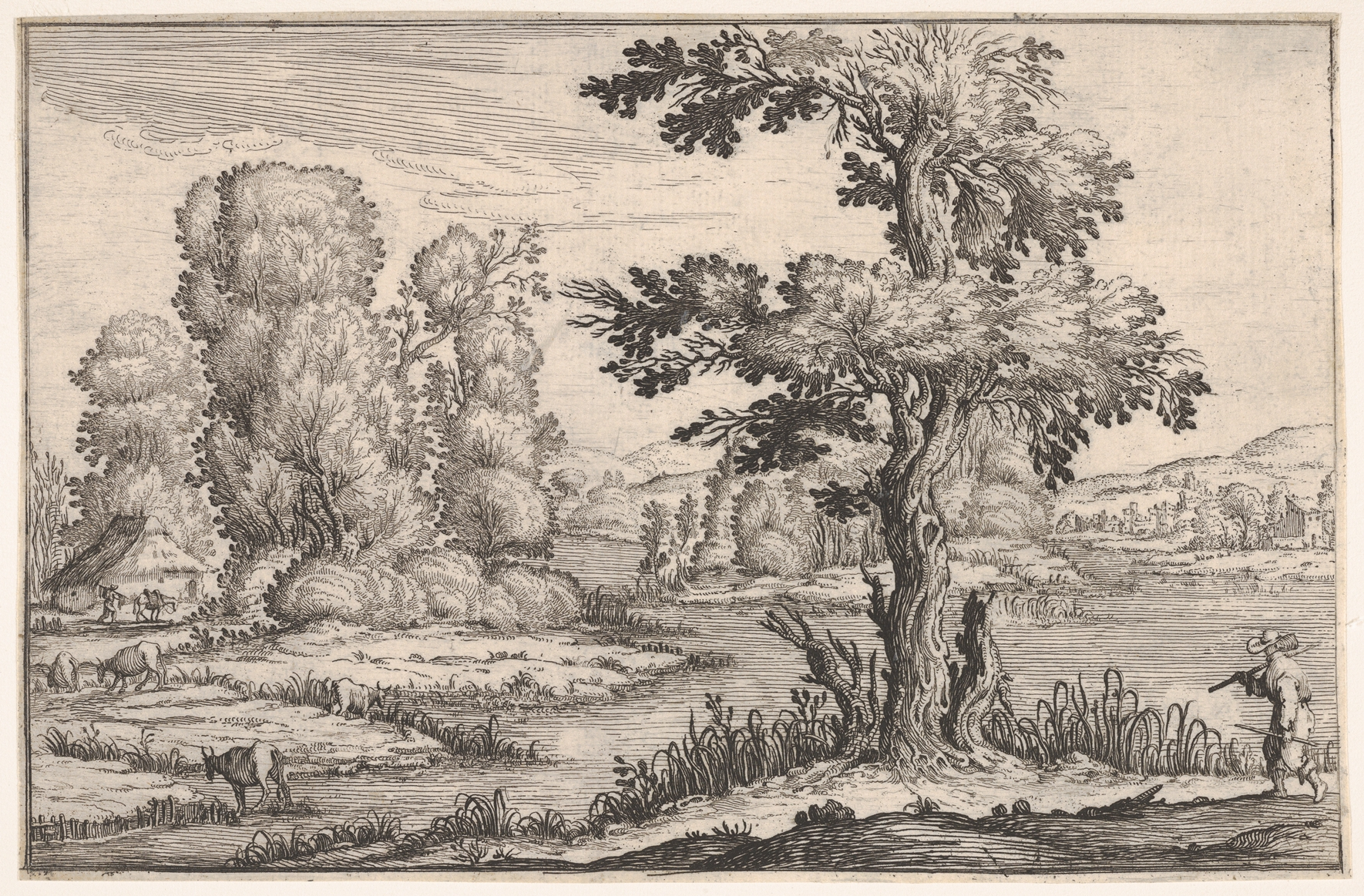
Landscape with goats grazing near a river and a figure in the right foreground (1638), from a series of landscapes dedicated to the Grand Duke of Tuscany

He was signing his works Bazzicaluva (even with only one z) or Bezzicaluve; but this surname, already taken as a nickname, in his family was quite recent, because his ancestors were called "Fregoni", as we can deduce from a document dated 1599, in which we find an "Alessandro Fregoni aliter Bezzica l'Uve".

In 1641, that is three years after the "rare and imaginary lands" that Bazzicaluva had dedicated to the Grand Duke, wishing him to possess "so many real worlds that Anaxagoras could not even imagine ", was published the tragic-heroic poem Le pazzie de'savi, or rather the Lambertaccio by Bartolomeo Bocchini, with 13 small illustrations of executed by Bazzicaluva that re-echoed the same roar of arms in which he, as a man, loved to live most of his days.

Apart from being an engraver, Bazzicaluva was also field master of the Grand Duke, court chamberlain in Innsbruck, castellan of the fortress of Livorno and governor of that of Siena.

The four Military Episodes of 1641 represented precisely: two cavalry charges, a naval combat, a march of cavalry, and among the first "imaginary lands" are a pursuit of runaway horses and an attack by brigands.

Bazzicaluva earned the praise of another powerful man of his time, Alessandro Visconti, who, by family tradition and personal inclination, fancied hunting, and he dedicated a series of "hunts" to him: the Departure, the Return, the Wild Boar Hunt, the Navigable River, the Stop, as well as the Appointment, a Landscape in a round frame and a Strange Entrance to the Monastery.

He was a pupil of Girolamo Parigi, and became castellan of the castle of Livorno. Bartsch describes seven of his prints, and Brulliot others. Of his works may be mentioned a Triumphal Procession, and twelve landscapes. He is described as a follower of the styles of Stefano della Bella and Jacques Callot. He painted a canvas for the church of Santi Stefano e Niccolao in Pescia.
