= Benedetto Orsi =

Italian painter

Benedetto Orsi (died 1680) was an Italian painter of the Baroque period.

== Biography ==
Orsi was born in Pescia in Tuscany. He was a pupil of Baldassare Franceschini (Il Volterrano. He painted a San Giovanni Evangelista for the Oratory of the Misericordia, situated adjacent to the parish church of Santi Stefano e Niccolao of Pescia,. He also painted some lunettes in the church of Sant Maria del Letto in Pistoia.
