= 1572 in art =

Events from the year 1572 in art.

== Works ==
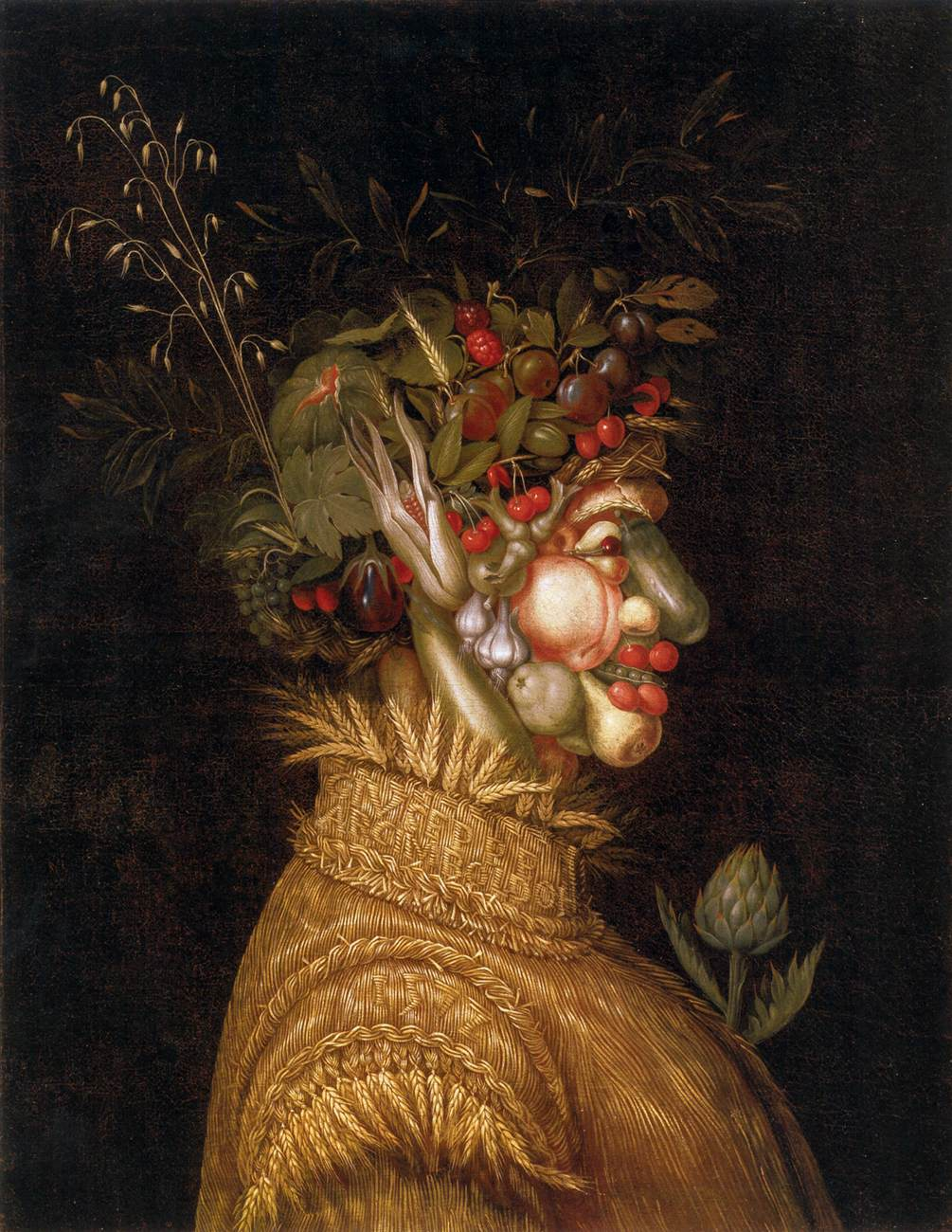
Arcimboldo – Summer, Denver Art Museum

- Giuseppe Arcimboldo – Summer
- Federico Barocci – Portrait of Francisco II della Rovere (Uffizi)
- Lucas de Heere (attributed) – The Family of Henry VIII, an Allegory of the Tudor Succession (approximate date)
- Nicholas Hilliard - Portrait miniature and (approximate date) Pelican Portrait of Elizabeth I of England
- Paolo Veronese
  - Allegory of the Battle of Lepanto (approximate date)
  - Feast of St Gregory the Great

== Births ==
- date unknown
  - Jan Antonisz van Ravesteyn, painter of the Dutch court in The Hague (died 1657)
  - Fabrizio Boschi, Italian painter of the early-Baroque period, active in Florence (died 1642)
  - Barend van Someren, Dutch Golden Age painter (died 1632)
- probable
  - Giovanni Bernardino Azzolini or Mazzolini or Asoleni, Italian painter (died 1645)

== Deaths ==
- March 5 - Giulio Campi, Italian painter and architect (born 1500)
- November 23 – Agnolo di Cosimo, Italian artist and poet (born 1503)
- December 22 - François Clouet, French Renaissance miniaturist and painter (born 1510)
- date unknown
  - Mir Sayyid Ali, Persian illustrator and painter (born 1510)
  - Mirabello Cavalori, Italian painter mainly active in Florence (born 1520)
  - Danese Cattaneo – Italian sculptor (born 1509)
- probable - Jean Goujon, French sculptor and architect during the French Renaissance (born c.1510)
