= 1571 in art =

Events from the year 1571 in art.

== Events ==
- Gian Paolo Lomazzo becomes blind.

== Works ==
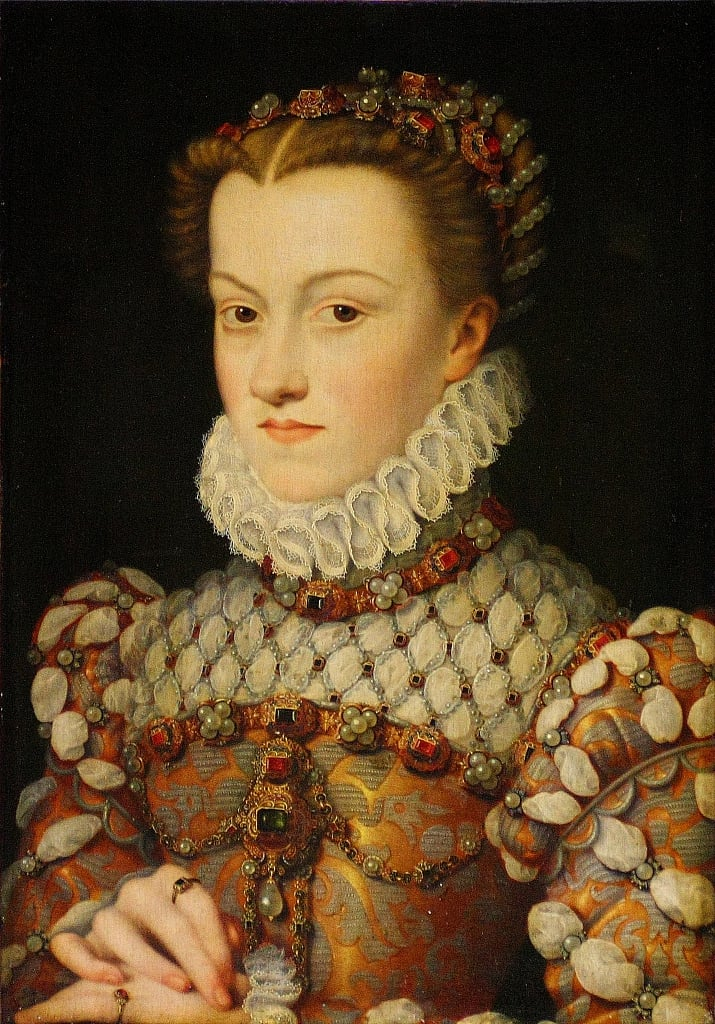
Clouet – Elisabeth of Austria, Queen of France, The Louvre, 1571

- François Clouet - Elisabeth of Austria, Queen of France, daughter of Holy Roman Emperor Maximilian II of Austria and Infanta Maria of Spain, wife of King Charles Charles IX of France
- Gian Paolo Lomazzo – Altarpiece for Foppa chapel in San Marco, Milan
- Titian – Tarquin and Lucretia

== Births ==
- September 29 – Caravaggio, Italian painter and one of the first great representatives of the Baroque school (died 1610)
- October 15 - Jacob Matham, Dutch engraver and pen-draftsman (died 1631)
- date unknown
  - Esther Inglis, Scottish miniaturist, embroiderer, calligrapher, translator and writer (died 1624)
  - Antiveduto Grammatica, proto-Baroque Italian painter nicknamed Antiveduto ("foreseen") (died 1626)
  - Rutilio di Lorenzo Manetti, Italian Mannerist painter (died 1639)
  - Paulus Moreelse, Dutch painter, mainly of portraits (died 1638)
  - Jan Harmensz. Muller, Dutch painter (died 1628)
  - Jacob van Swanenburgh, Dutch history painter and teacher (died 1638)

== Deaths ==
- February 13 – Benvenuto Cellini, Italian artist (born 1500)
- March 21 - Hans Asper, Swiss painter (born 1499)
- date unknown
  - Pompeo Cesura - Italian painter and engraver (born 1500)
  - Niccolo dell'Abbate, Italian Mannerist painter and decorator, of the Emilian school (born 1509/1512)
  - Maso da San Friano, Italian painter active in Florence (born 1536)
  - Jan van der Elburcht, Dutch painter (born 1500)
