= Madonna and Child (Cima, Cardiff) =

Painting by Cima da Conegliano

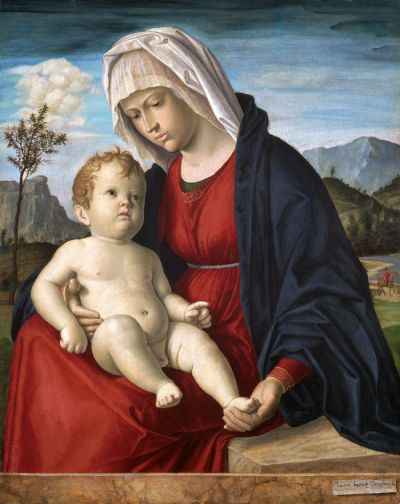
Madonna and Child (1500) by Cima da Conegliano

Madonna and Child is an oil-on-panel painting by Cima da Conegliano, created in 1500, now in the National Museum of Wales in Cardiff.

This painting depicts the Madonna with a white veil on her head and the Child in her arms. At the base of the work, the marble parapet bears the artist's signature on a cartouche; in the background on the right there is a small Turkish knight.
