= Venus, Cupid and Mars =

Painting by Guercino

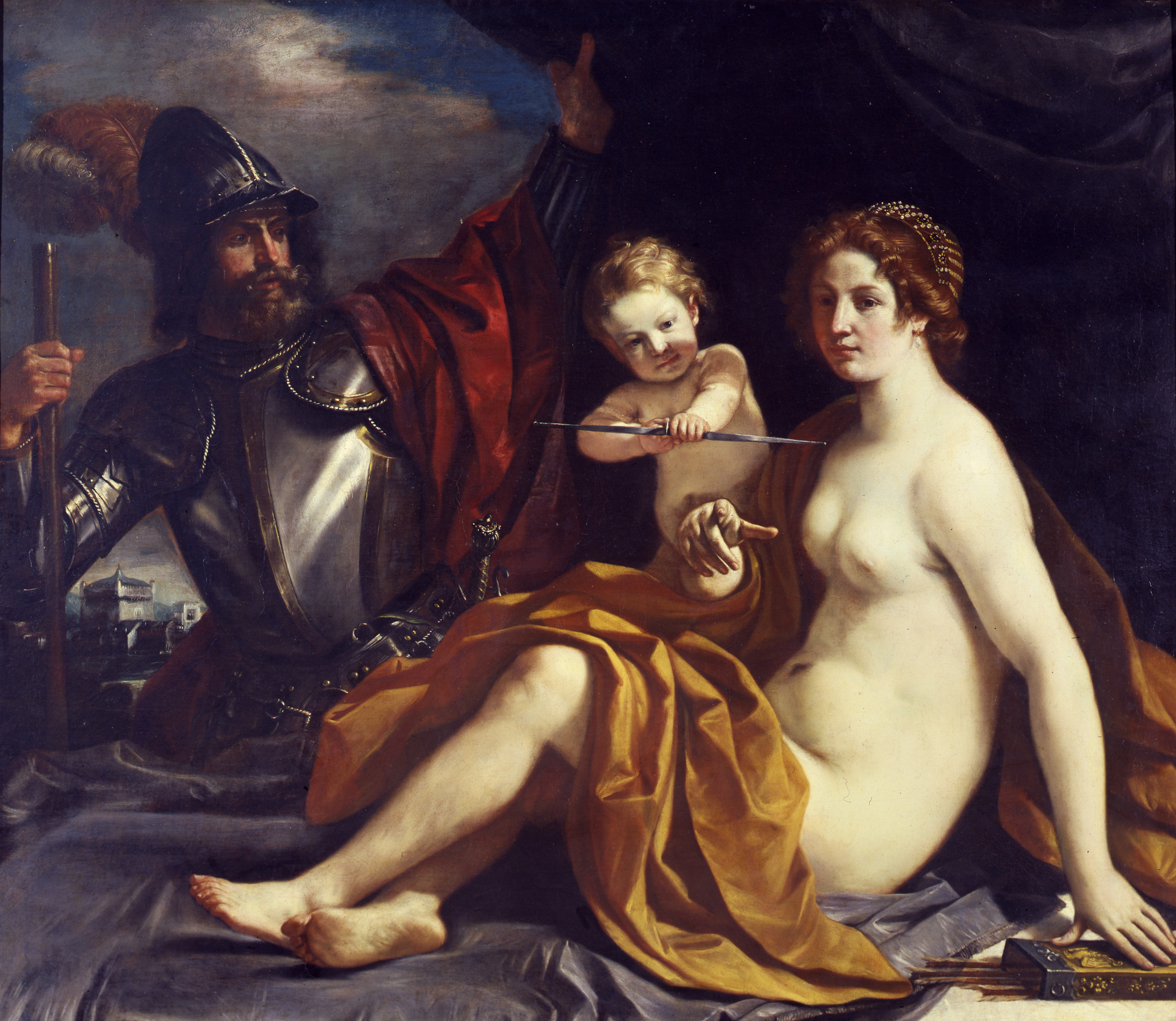
Venus, Cupid and Mars (1633) by Guercino

Venus, Cupid and Mars is a 1633 oil-on-canvas painting by the Italian Baroque painter Guercino, commissioned by Francesco I d'Este for his Ducal Palace of Sassuolo around 1632–1633, when the artist was in that city to paint portraits of the d'Este family. It is now in the Galleria Estense in Modena.

== History ==
The final payment for the work was made on 18 January 1634, with Guercino receiving the balance from Cesare Cavazza, the court chamberlain or 'guardarobiere', a sum equal to 126 scudi – the advance on the work is unknown but was probably about 30 scudi. Guercino's biographer Carlo Cesare Malvasia states it was the first he produced in 1634, "Made for a gentleman in Modena, a canvas to give to the Most Serene [Duke] of that place, showing a Venus with an archer Cupid sitting by her, and a Mars". A document of November 1633 from Guercino to Cavazza refers to a painting then in progress for the duke, hoping to finish it soon and deliver it before Christmas that same year, as most probably happened given the payment date.

It was recorded in the 'camera dei Sogni' in the palace between 1692 and 1694 before Francesco III d'Este took it to Modena after selling a huge chunk of the family collection to Augustus III of Saxony in 1745–1746. The French seized the work in 1796 and retained it until 1815, when it rejoined those which had remained in the Este collection in its present home.
