= Alessandro Oliverio =

Italian painter

Alessandro Oliverio (1500–1544) was an Italian painter.

Oliverio was active in Venice from 1532 to 1544, and was influenced by Girolamo da Santacroce. He primarily painted landscapes and portraits. His works can be seen in museums such as the National Gallery of Ireland.
