= Self-Portrait with a Sunflower =

1632–1633 painting by Anthony van Dyck

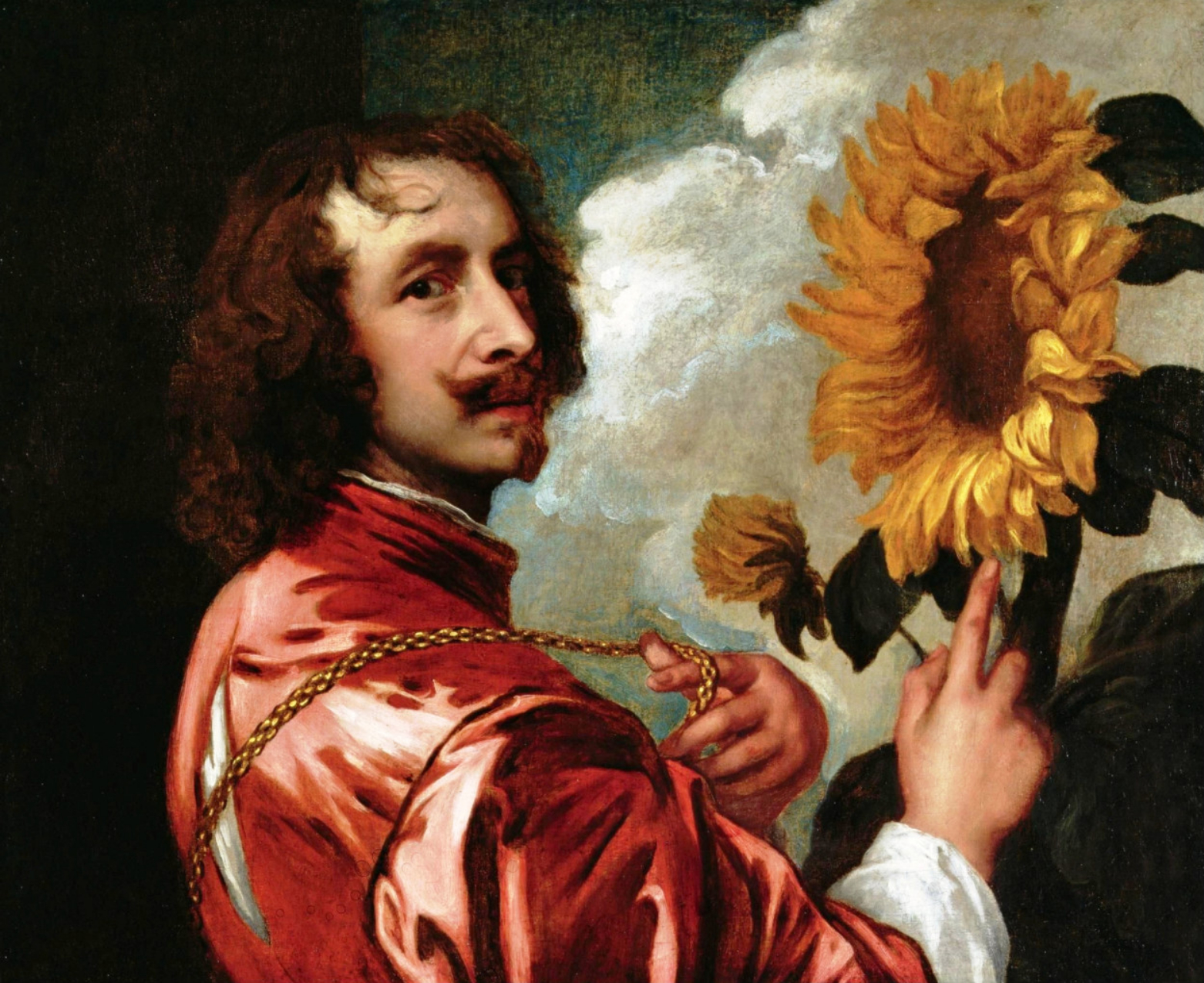
- Artist: Anthony van Dyck
- Year: c. 1632 to 1633
- Medium: Oil on canvas
- Dimensions: 73 cm × 60 cm (29 in × 24 in)
- Location: Eaton Hall, Cheshire, England

Self-Portrait with a Sunflower is a self-portrait by Anthony van Dyck, a Flemish Baroque artist from Antwerp, then in the Spanish Netherlands. The oil on canvas painting is generally between 1632 and 1633. His successful ventures in the Spanish Netherlands and Italy propelled van Dyck into a career as court painter. Van Dyck was serving as "principal Paynter in order to their Majesties" at the court of Charles I of England when he created this self-portrait. The symbolism behind the sunflower and gold chain have been a point of contention amongst various art historians. Van Dyck's dedication to capturing the likeness of his models was the basis for his strong influence over the art of portraiture long after his death in 1641. His portrait technique evolved into what is referred to as his Late English period as seen in Self-Portrait with a Sunflower. This work is now in the private collection of the Duke of Westminster, housed at Eaton Hall in Cheshire.

== Description ==
The portrait features the artist Anthony van Dyck looking over his shoulder at the viewer. His gaze centres on the viewer, as if calmly startled by the presence of an onlooker. His right hand is poised to touch the bottom petals of a yellow sunflower. His left index finger and thumb hold a gold chain that extends across his right shoulder and down his posterior side. This is a visual trick of calling attention to the chain and the message it portrays. This chain is understood to be a gift the artist received from his patron, Charles I. The gold chain holds a medal with the king's likeness on it, but is concealed by the artist's right arm sleeve. He is portrayed to be outdoors in nature, as seen by the clouds in the background. He is clothed in a richly-dyed pink overcoat with a white shirt visible on his collar, shirt cuffs, and a slender slit on his back. The light source is radiating from the bottom left corner, illuminating the outer petals of the sunflower. This gives the visual effect of the sunflower "shining" on Anthony van Dyck's face in approval, a common interpretation of the sunflower.

== Background ==
=== Van Dyck in the Court of Charles I ===
King Charles I was notoriously famous for his patronage of the arts, and during the early 1600s, extended his collection of artwork extensively with the addition of works once owned by the Duke of Mantua. During the height of his rule, Charles had amassed a great collection of works totalling an estimated 1,750 paintings, some of which were created by Van Dyck. Shortly after his coronation in 1626, the King sought to create a fleet of Baroque artists, including Peter Paul Rubens and Orazio Gentileschi, to work and live in England. The Dutch artist Daniël Mytens was Charles' official court painter before Van Dyck's arrival to England, yet lacked the skills to depict Charles as regally as he wished.

Van Dyck became a sought after artist soon after submitting a self-portrait to court officials and creating a religious work for Queen Henrietta Maria of France. He was asked to come to England in April 1632, was knighted for his work and loyalty to the crown later in July, and subsequently became a favourite of Charles. He was given a quiet house along with a handsome pension of £200 annually. It is estimated that van Dyck created over 40 portraits of King Charles alone, along with various other paintings of the royal family together. These works were commonly sent to other monarchs and functioned as diplomatic gifts. In England, van Dyck was able to develop his style and live well within his means as an artist.

=== Provenance ===
The painting belongs to the private collection of the Duke of Westminster. It is currently housed in the country house of Eaton Hall, located in Cheshire, England. Since the work belongs to a private collection, it currently is not and has not been on public display for quite some time. The current title holder of Duke and over-seer of Eaton Hall is Hugh Grosvenor, 7th Duke of Westminster. The Dukes of Westminster have been known to loan works out for a handful of exhibits, but Van Dyck's self-portrait has not been publicly displayed in over a decade. A spokesperson for the Duke made a comment in 2007 that no private appointments to view any work in the collection will be taken. The painting was shown in the exhibition Charles I: King and Collector in the Royal Academy of Arts from 27 January to 15 April 2018.

== Interpretation ==
Sir Kenelm Digby with a Sunflower
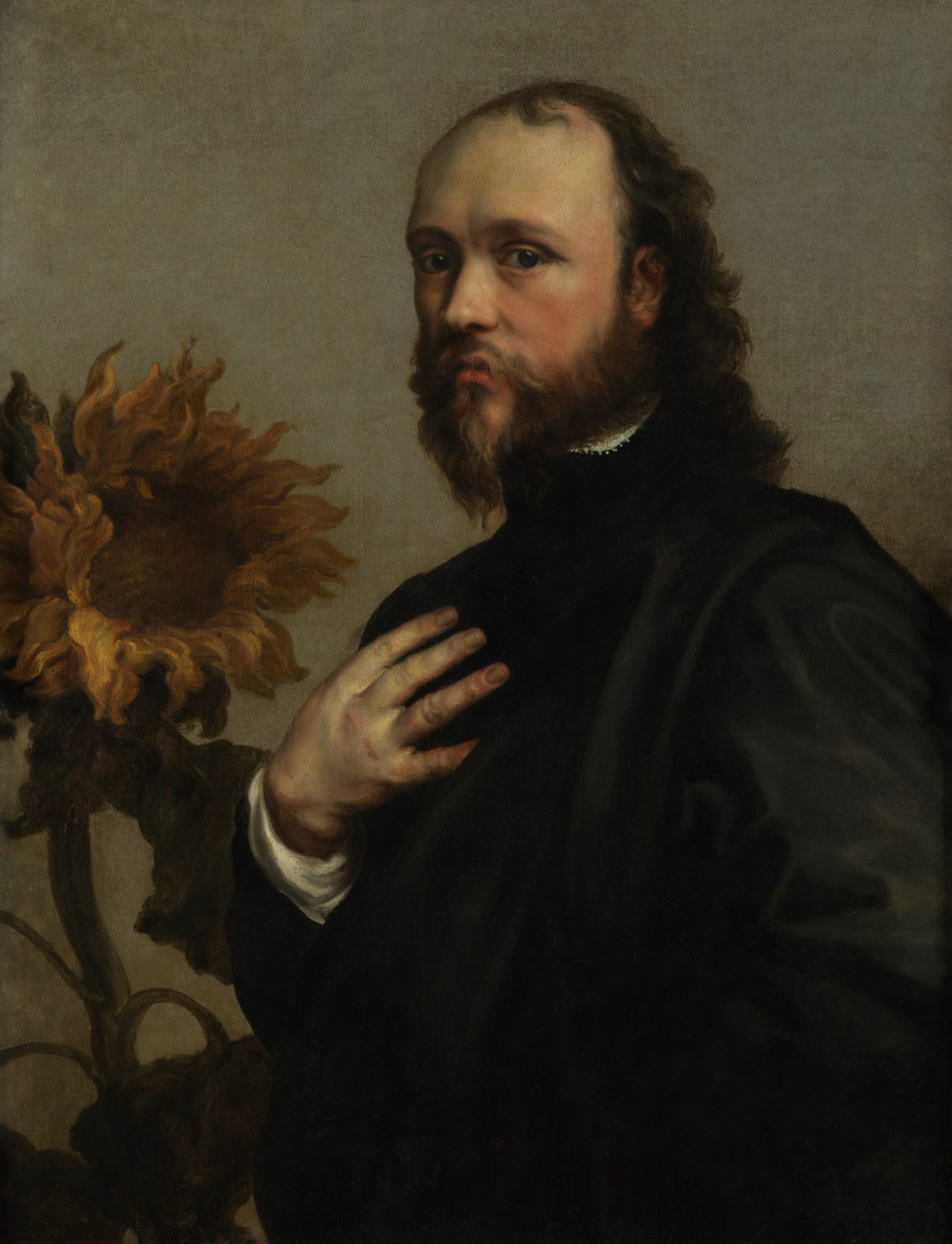
- Artist: Anonymous painter(s) in the workshop of Anthony van Dyck
- Year: c. 1630s
- Medium: oil on canvas
- Dimensions: 91.5 cm × 71 cm (36.0 in × 28 in)
- Location: National Maritime Museum, Greenwich, England

=== Sunflower ===
Historians and scholars have hotly debated the symbolism behind the sunflower. The concept of the language of flowers and deriving symbolism from flora had not yet gained the popularity that it would later have in literature, art, poetry, and more; yet a plethora of flowers were associated with certain traits and characteristics even in the Baroque era. The sunflower (Helianthus annuus) is symbolic of devotion and fidelity because it turns during the day to follow the Sun in its course across the sky, as reflected in its French name tournesol, the Spanish girasol, Italian girasole, etc. This obvious symbolism was naturally noted in 17th century English emblem books, in which the sunflower represents loyalty. Many of these emblem books were published and made available in Van Dyck's home city, Antwerp, but the characteristic of the plant is known to every gardener, and no literary source is necessary. Although he did not state personally that this devotion is specifically to the Crown, it has been interpreted that this portrait is a declaration of loyalty only to Charles I. Presiding as court painter to the king of England was an honour that Van Dyck revelled in, as well as an honour that any artist would be proud of. Art historians agree that the golden chain van Dyck has draped across his right shoulder was gifted to him by his patron Charles I and that the work was created while he was a court painter. The sunflower and its position facing him are interpreted as symbols for the monarch's approval of van Dyck.

Yet it is not unanimously agreed that there is direct correlation between the artist and the patron specifically. Anthony van Dyck's workshop created a work likely between 1635 and 1650 that depicted his dear friend Sir Kenelm Digby, an English astrologer, natural philosopher, and royal courtier. The oil on canvas is titled Sir Kenelm Digby with a sunflower. A testament to the friendship between Digby and van Dyck are the several portraits van Dyck painted to honour the late Venetia Stanley, Digby's wife. He also completed a family portrait of the Digby couple and their two young children between 1632 and 1633, the same years he worked on his sunflower self-portrait. The sunflower in Kenelm Digby's portrait would not make sense to function as the same symbolic nod to the crown. It would be more accurate for the sunflower to symbolise devotion and allegiance here, for Digby served the Crown as an unofficial naval consultant in the mid-1620s, as well as fought in a duel in 1641 in defence of the King and his namesake. Those in favour of this particular theory also state that Van Dyck's personal nature did not lend itself to be boastful about his dependency on another, even if that person was the King of England.

Later, in the early 1640s, the portrait would be used during the English Civil War as a loosely defined propaganda piece, persuading citizens to join arms for a royalist allegiance, and successfully did so in uniting the war-torn kingdom. This is evidence to prove that if the sunflower were to be a symbol only of Van Dyck's fidelity to his patron, the portrait would not have favoured as well with a wide audience looking for inspiration and relatable meaning in an artwork.

Charles I in Three Positions
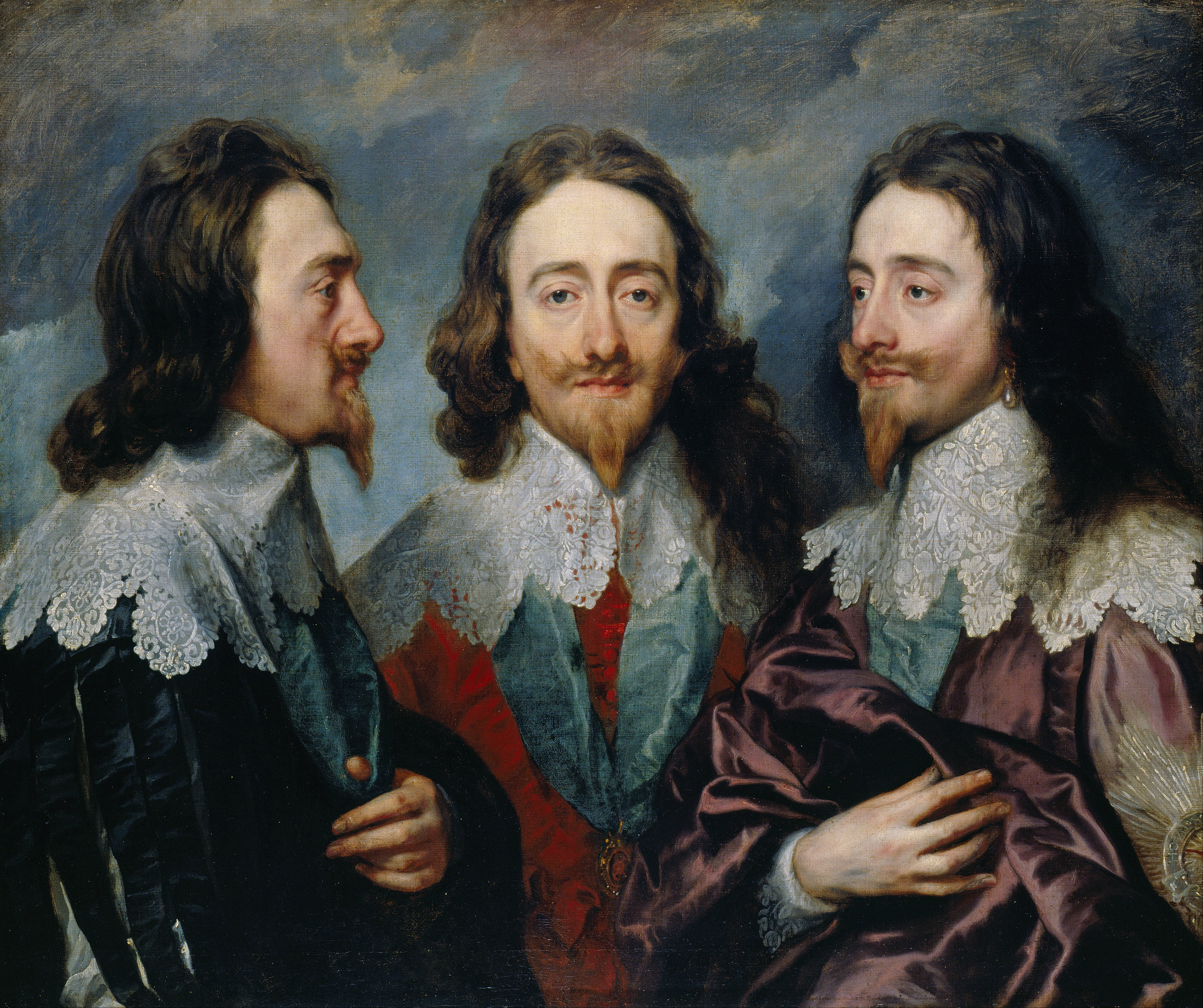
- Artist: Anthony van Dyck
- Year: c. 1635 or 1636
- Medium: Oil on canvas
- Location: Royal Collection

=== Gold Chain ===
Famously, the chain Anthony van Dyck dons in the portrait is a token of Charles I's appreciation for his artistic work. Van Dyck had only been in England for a little over a year before a warrant was issued from court officials for the medal of 'One Hundred and Ten Pounds value' be given to him. Historians believe the chain and medal were designed by Nicolas Briot. Oftentimes, gifts such as these were worked into the commission price an artist were to be paid following the completion of a work. Not only was the token of appreciation a nod to the work Van Dyck had accomplished during his first year as court painter, but also a royal decree of his status in England. When comparing the artist's other self-portraits, especially those he made while he was pupil under Peter Paul Rubens, the way he portrays simple, functional chains differs vastly to the outwardly candid adornment he sports in Self-Portrait with a Sunflower. The touching of the chain is symbolic of his deep and active involvement in his duties, yet he restrains from making that the centre of the self-portrait by balancing the chain imagery with the sunflower.

=== Van Dyck or Vandyke Beard ===
Anthony van Dyck was well known for his many attempts of capturing his own likeness on canvas. As such, viewers were exposed to his unique style through his artwork. Van Dyck was capable of influencing 17th century Englishmen into adopting his mannerisms and outward appearance. He was known for wearing his facial hair in a particular way, and would later popularise the look by painting his various models with the same beard. The style known as the Van Dyck beard came to consist of a moustache and goatee with the hair on the cheeks completely shaven. The moustache could be curled at the tips and include or exclude a soul patch depending on personal preference. The look was thought to have a regal and stately appearance, and King Charles I himself often liked to be depicted wearing the facial hair style in his portraits. Because Charles I was seen so often sporting the Van Dyck beard, it is also referred to as the "Charlie". The trend slowly died out before practically disappearing from fashion during the English Restoration under the rule of King Charles II.

In Self-Portrait with a Sunflower, van Dyck is sporting a classic "Vandyke"; his chin goatee consists of a tapered end, and his moustache tips are curled and pointed upward. His upper lip is nearly hidden by the thick, dark hair of his moustache whilst remaining cleanly trimmed, indicative of the pride he has in the growth of his hair and his appearance.

== Copies ==
Several early copies of the painting exist. There is a copy of the painting, which was also painted by van Dyck, in the property of the foundation of the Friedenstein Palace in Gotha (Germany). This painting was stolen in 1979 and resurfaced in 2019. Early copies are also in the collections at Berkeley Castle and Ham House. An early copy was part of the collection at Ickworth House. An early copy was for sale at auction at Sotheby's in April 2022.

== See also ==
- List of paintings by Anthony van Dyck
