= Jan Harmensz. Muller =

Dutch engraver and painter (1571–1628)

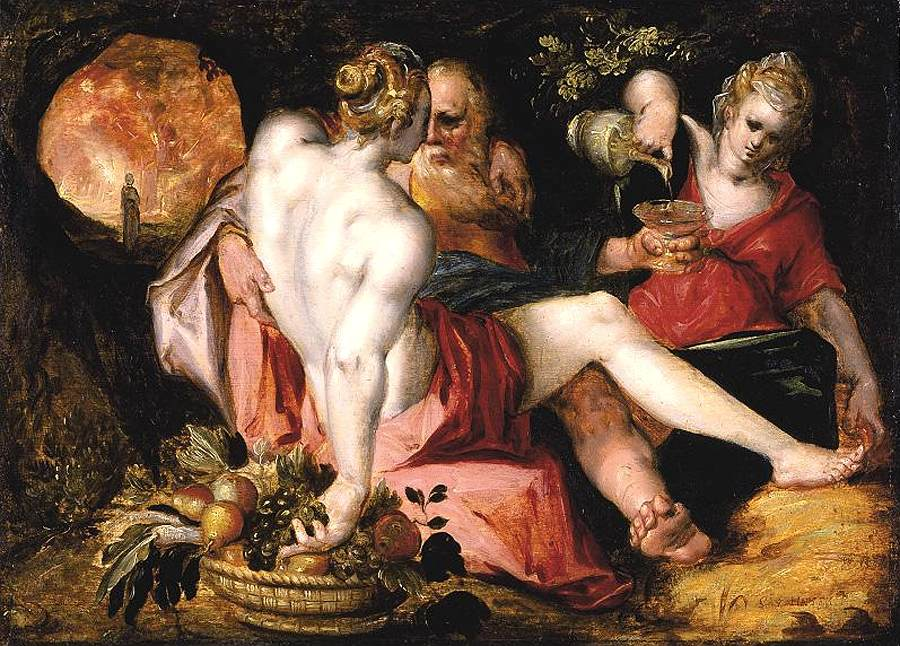
Jan Harmensz. Muller, Lot and His Daughters, 1600

Jan Harmensz. Muller (1571–1628) was a Dutch engraver and painter.

Muller was born in Amsterdam. His father was a book printer, engraver and publisher. He learned the engraving trade while working in the family business. He traveled and lived in Italy for a time. Muller returned home, inherited his father's business, and died in 1628.

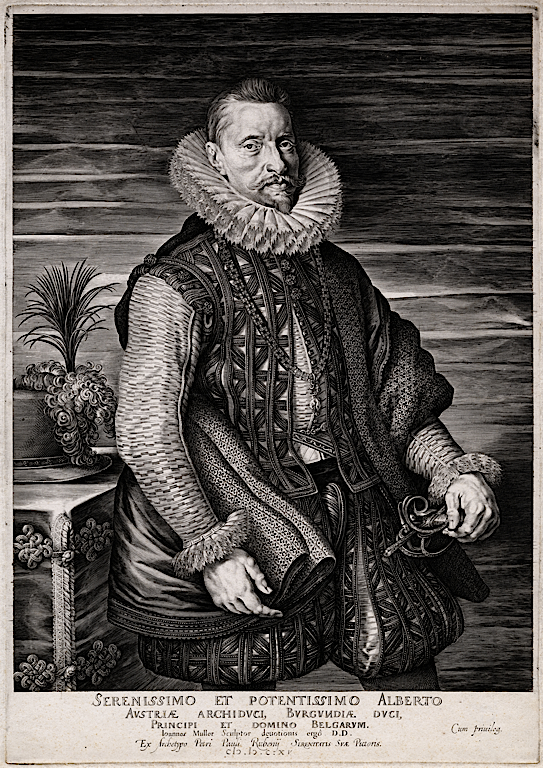
Jan Muller after Sir Peter Paul Rubens, Albert, Archduke of Austria, c. 1615, engraving

== Works ==
- Cleopatra (c. 1592), Te Papa, Wellington
- Rape of Sabine, The Art Institute of Chicago, Chicago
- Couple embracing, The J. Paul Getty Museum, Los Angeles
- Two studies of Atlas, The Fitzwilliam Museum, Cambridge, UK
- Masked Ball, Le Louvre, Paris
- Head, Le Louvre, Paris
- Agar in the desert, Le Louvre, Paris
- The Prodigal son being seduced, Le Louvre, Paris
- Raising of Lazarus', National Gallery of Ottawa, Canada
