= Diego Gutiérrez (cartographer) =

Spanish cartographer and cosmographer

Americae Sive Qvartae Orbis Partis Nova Et Exactissima Descriptio, 1562

Diego Gutiérrez was a Spanish cosmographer and cartographer of the Casa de la Contratación. He was given this post by royal appointment on 22 October 1554, after the death of his father Diego Gutiérrez in January 1554, and worked on the Padrón Real, the Spanish master map used on all royal sailing ships in the Spanish fleet.

== New World map ==
In 1562 Gutiérrez published a remarkable map entitled Americae Sive Quartae Orbis Partis Nova Et Exactissima Descriptio in Antwerp (then part of the Spanish Netherlands) in collaboration with the printer Hieronymus Cock. The reason it was published in Antwerp was because the Spanish engravers were not skilled enough to print such a complicated document.

Gutiérrez's map features not only the Amazon River system and Lake Titicaca as well as other geographical features, but also fanciful depictions of parrots, monkeys, mermaids, huge sea creatures, Brazilian cannibals, Patagonian giants, and an erupting volcano in central Mexico.

It was the first map to print the toponym "California". It also recorded the first appearance of a word for "Appalachia," as the term "Apalchen."
