= Americae Sive Quartae Orbis Partis Nova Et Exactissima Descriptio =

1562 map of the Americas

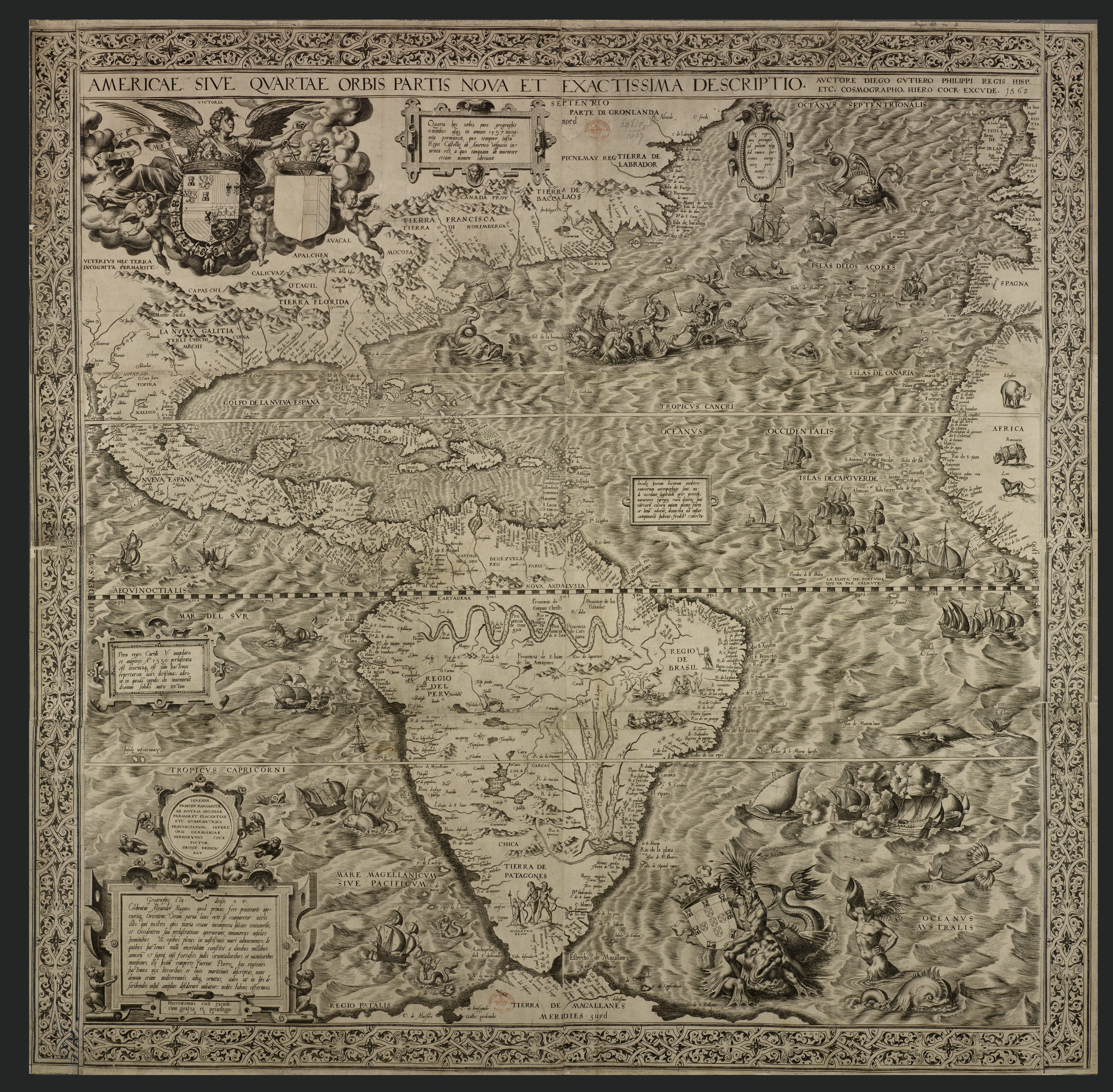
The British Library copy

Americae Sive Quartae Orbis Partis Nova Et Exactissima Descriptio (Latin: A New and Most Exact Description of America or The Fourth Part of the World) is an ornate geographical map of the Americas, made in 1562 by Spanish cartographer Diego Gutiérrez and Flemish artist Hieronymus Cock. The map encompasses the eastern coast of North America, the entire Central and South America and parts of the western coasts of Europe and Africa. Americae Sive Quartae Orbis Partis Nova Et Exactissima Descriptio is the earliest scale wall map of the New World and the first to use the name "California".

The map consists of six neatly-joined engraved sheets. Measuring 93×86 cm, it remained the largest map of America for a century. It has a longitude grid, the equator, the Tropic of Cancer and the Tropic of Capricorn, but no latitude grid. The map also lacks the Tordesillas meridian, demarcating the Spanish and Portuguese possessions in the New World. Along with mermaids and other sea creatures, the map features objects that had been popularized in Europe after the first voyage of Christopher Columbus, such as parrots, cannibals, Patagonian giants, and an erupting volcano in central Mexico. One of the depicted Patagonian giants is handing a bow to a conquistador. The top left corner features the goddess Victoria behind the arms of Spain and France, which are carried by three putti. It is believed that the alliance between the two kingdoms, forged by the marriage of Philip II and Elisabeth of Valois, is the reason why two arms are positioned close to each other. The map uses the Classical Latin letter "V" instead of "U".

There are two extant copies of the map, one in the Library of Congress (Washington, D.C.) and the other in the British Library (London). The actual total number of copies printed is not known. The Library of Congress's copy was formerly in the collection of the Duke of Gotha until its sale at a 1932 auction in Munich. It was then acquired by an American book dealer who in turn sold it to Lessing J. Rosenwald. In 1949 Rosenwald gave the map to the Library of Congress.

== Details ==
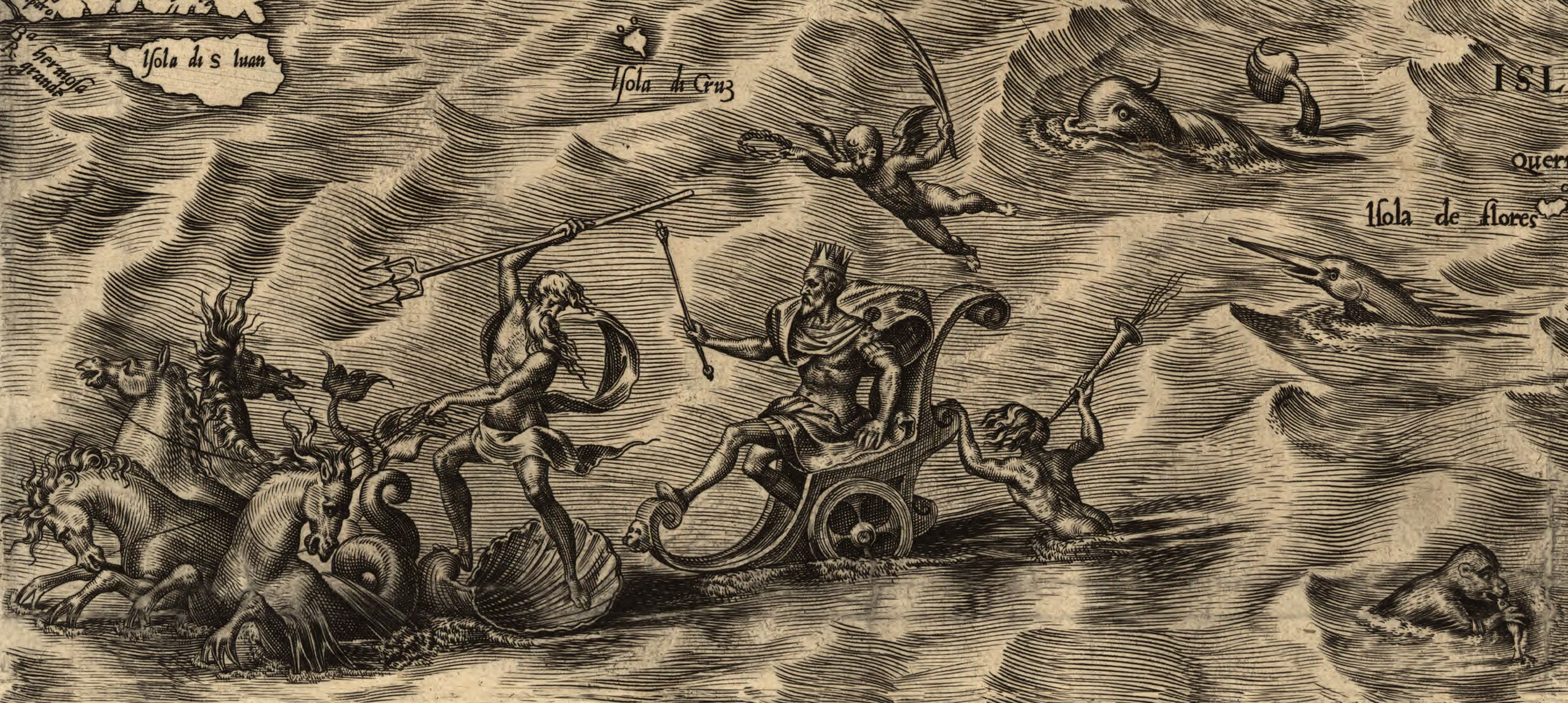
Deity of the seas in a chariot

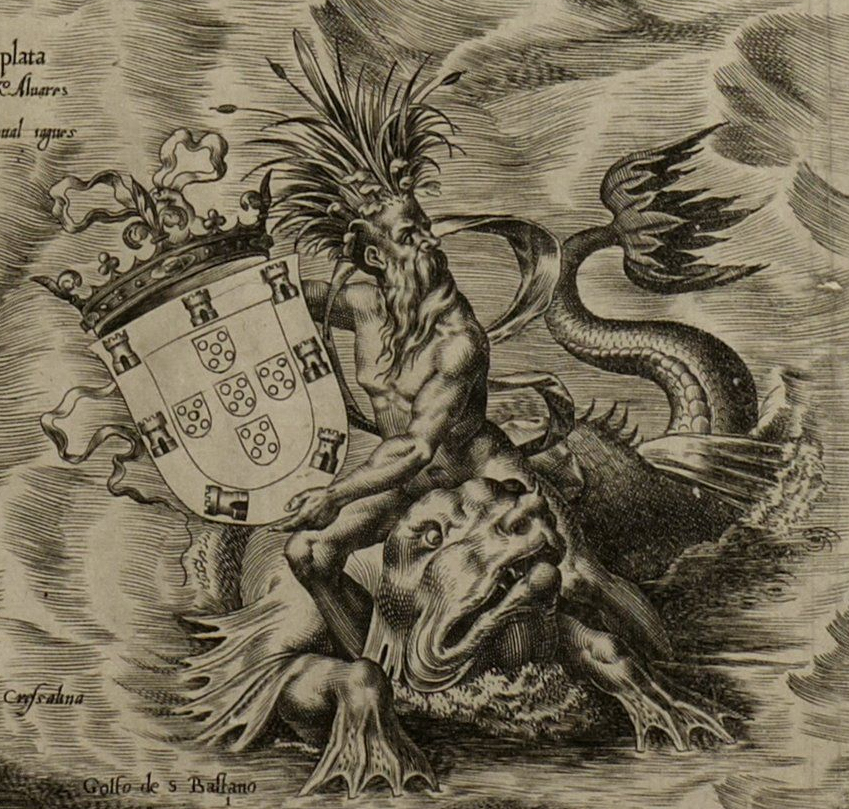
Coat of arms of the Kingdom of Portugal

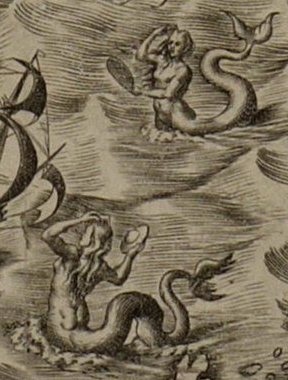
Mermaids in the Pacific Ocean
