= Santi Stefano e Niccolao =

Roman Catholic church in Tuscany, Italy

Coordinates: 43°54′16.71″N 10°41′16.02″E

Santi Stefano e Niccolao or Stefano e Nicolò is a Roman Catholic church located in Pescia, region of Tuscany, Italy.

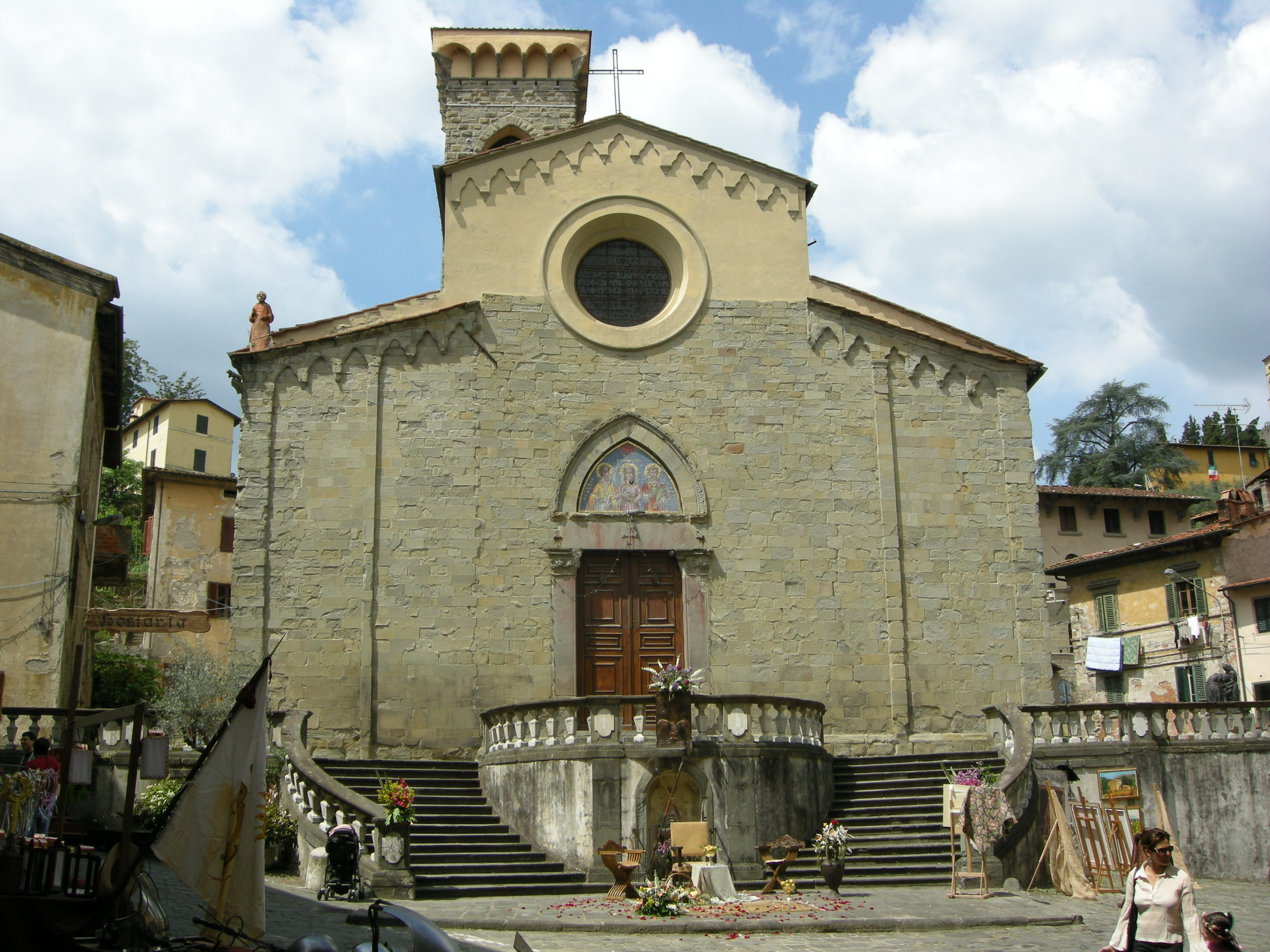
Facade of church

== History ==
A church at the site dates from about the 11th century, but construction of the church continued until the 1300s. The scenographic, baroque entry stairs were built by Agostino Cornacchini. The main 13th-century portal, with a pointed tympanum above, was refurbished by Pietro Bernardini with flanking baroque-style corinthian pilasters. The bell-tower dates to the 13th-century.

In the 1st altar on the right is a venerated icon of the Virgin covering her faithful with her cape, with another depicting the Marriage of Cannae by Benedetto Orsi. The wooden 15th-century Madonna detta dell'Acquavino (Virgin of the Annunciation) sculpture has been attributed to Matteo Civitali.

In the 2nd altar on the right is a Visitation (1644) by Agostino Ciampelli, a pupil of Santi di Tito. Ciampelli also painted the canvases flanking the altar with depictions of St Sebastian and St Michael Archangel.

In the 3rd altar on the right is a canvas depicting St Peter in Chains by Alessandro Tiarini. The canvas in the choir depicting San Policronio and other Saints was painted by Ercole Bazzicaluva, who is best known for his engravings in the style of Callot, Stefano della Bella, and Cantagallina.

In the altar of the Sacrament, of the left side of the nave near the apse, is a canvas depicting, the Archangel Raphael and Tobias returning sight to Tobias' father by Alessandro Bardelli; and in the next chapel a Virgin of the Annunciation by the cavalier Giovanni Battista Paggi. Between the two chapels on the left is a canvas depicting Jesus changing the heart of St Catherine of Siena by Jacopo Vignali, pupil of Rosselli. The church has a processional standard with the Vergine addolorata, by the cavalier Luigi Norsini.

Adjacent to this church are two paired oratories. The right pair is the Oratory of the Santissimo, with an altarpiece by Benedetto Orsi, the left pair, is the Oratory of the Virgin of the Misericordia with another Orsi painting. The main altar has an 18th-century wooden crucifix.
