= Shao Mi =

Chinese artist (1592–1642)

Shao Mi (Shao Mi, traditional: 邵彌, simplified: 邵弥); ca. 1592-1642 was a Chinese landscape painter, calligrapher, and poet during the Ming dynasty (1368–1644).

Shao was born in Changzhou County (長洲縣, not Changzhou) (now part of Suzhou) in the Jiangsu province. His style name was 'Sengmi' and his sobriquets were 'Guachou and Fentuo jushi '. Shao's landscapes have a pure and plain taste featuring highly detailed bamboo inks.
