= Wang Duo (Ming dynasty) =

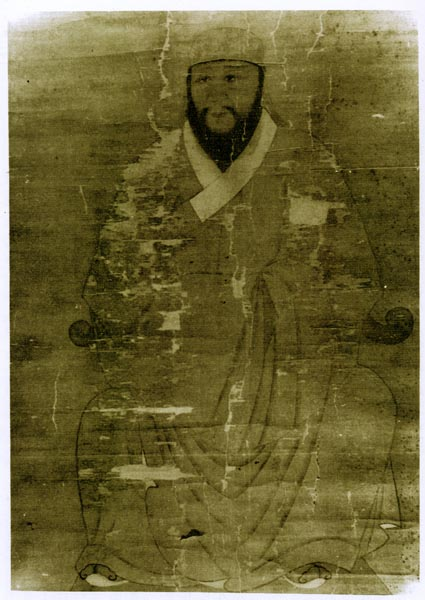
Wang Duo

Wang Duo (simplified Chinese: 王铎; traditional Chinese: 王鐸; pinyin: Wáng Duó; 1592–1652), is a Chinese calligrapher, painter, and poet in Ming dynasty.

Wang was born in Mengjin in the Henan province. His style name was 'Juesi' or 'Juezhi' and his sobriquets were 'Songqiao', 'Chi'an', or 'Yantan Yusou'. Wang's calligraphy followed the style of Yan Zhenqing and Mi Fu, utilizing refined strokes and perfect composition.
