= 1569 in art =

Events from the year 1569 in art.

== Works ==
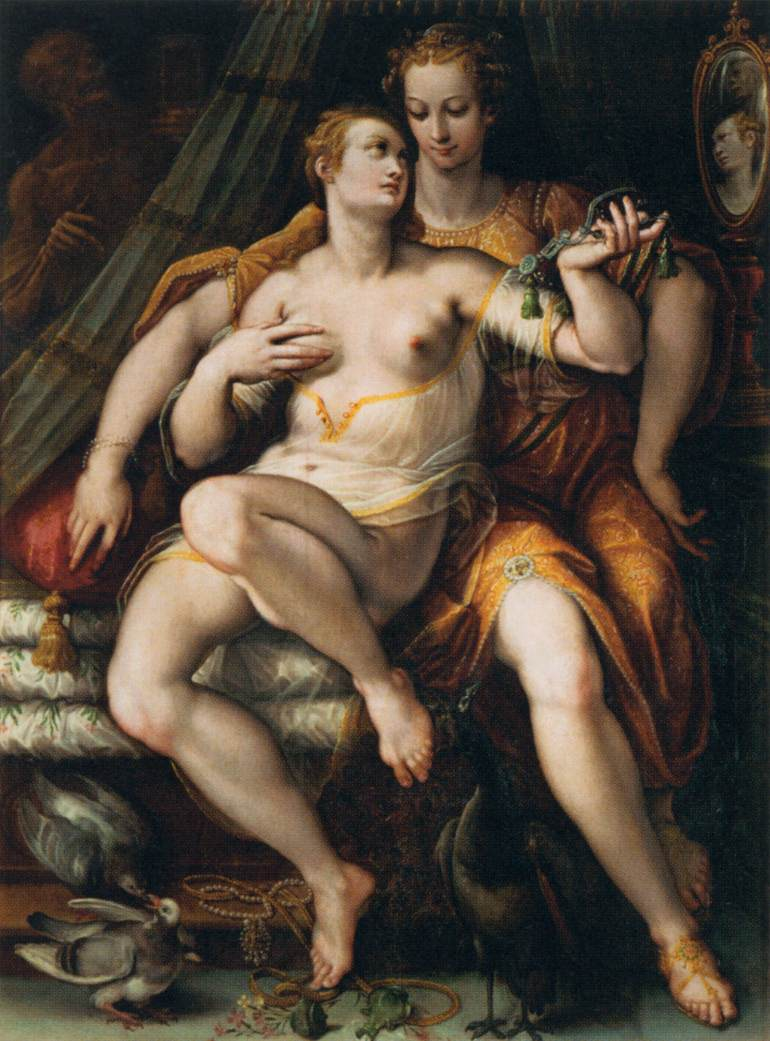
Stradanus – Vanity, Modesty and Death (Musée du Louvre)

- Federico Barocci – Deposition (Perugia Cathedral)
- Joachim Beuckelaer – The Four Elements: "Water" and "Earth"
- Bronzino – The Martyrdom of St. Lawrence (fresco, Basilica of San Lorenzo, Florence)
- Lucas Cranach the Younger – The Vineyard of the Lord
- Gerardus Mercator – Nova et Aucta Orbis Terrae Descriptio ad Usum Navigantium Emendata
- Cristoforo Rosa (with his brother Stefano) – entry ceilings for Biblioteca Marciana, Venice
- Stradanus – Vanity, Modesty and Death
- Frescos in Studenica monastery

== Births ==
- Carlo Bononi, Italian painter of the School of Ferrara (died 1632)
- Lucio Massari, Italy painter of the School of Bologna (died 1633)
- Juan Bautista Mayno, Spanish painter of the Baroque period (died 1649)
- Frans Pourbus the younger, Flemish painter (died 1622)

== Deaths ==
- September 9 – Pieter Brueghel the Elder, Netherlandish Renaissance painter and printmaker known for his landscapes and peasant scenes (born 1525)
- date unknown
  - Vincenzo Cartari, Italian painter (born 1531)
  - Girolamo Mazzola Bedoli, Italian painter of the Parmesan School of Painting (born 1500)
  - Giovanni Battista Castello, Italian historical painter (born c. 1500)
  - 1568/1569 - Jacob Binck, German engraver and painter (born between 1490-1504)
