= Hans Besser =

German painter

- Born: 1510
- Died: after 1558
- Style: portrait painting
- Movement: Renaissance

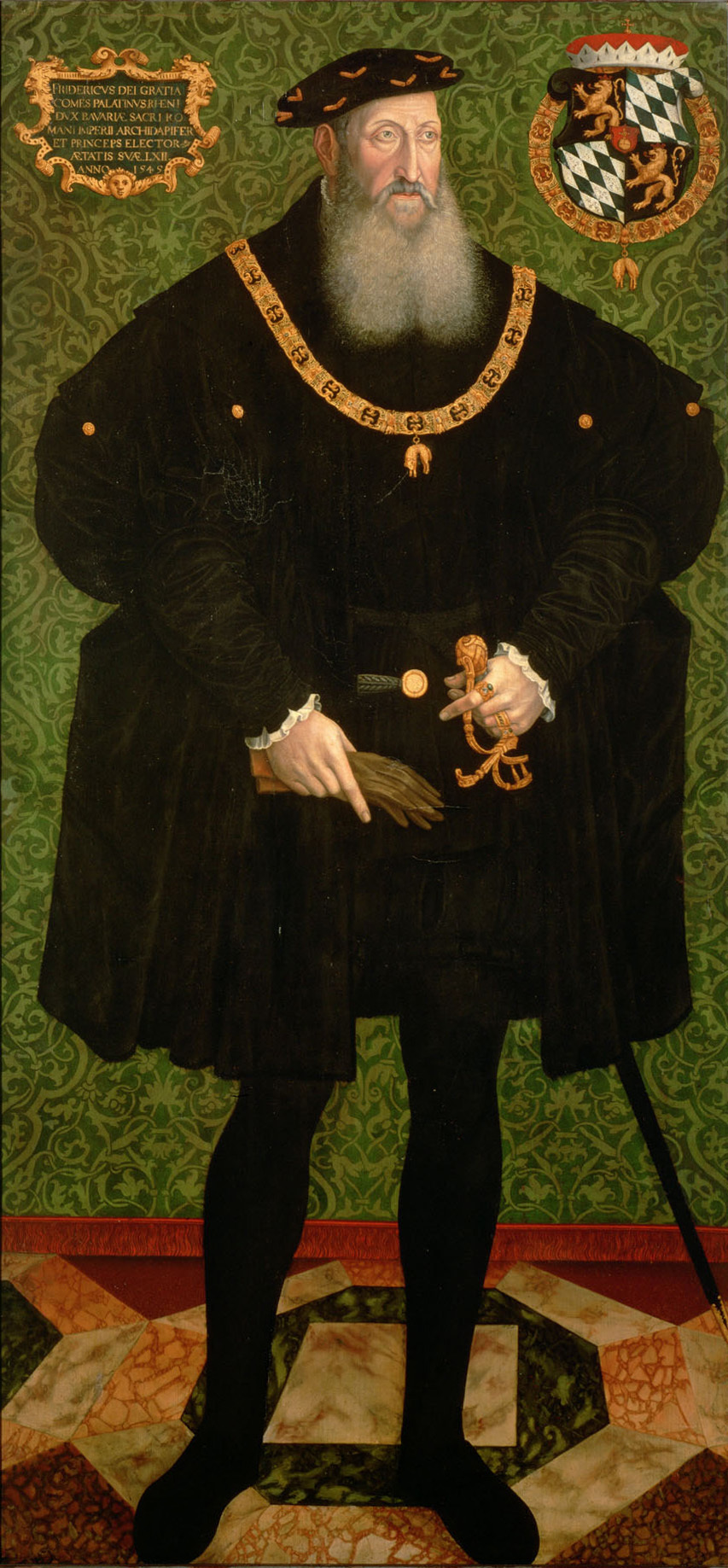
Frederick II by Hans Besser, Kunsthistorisches Museum, 1545

Hans Besser (1510 – after 1558) was a German Renaissance portrait painter. His exact date of death is not known.

Not much is known about Besser's life except through his works. He was probably born in Aachen, Cologne and left in 1537 because of religious persecution, and found refuge in the Electoral Palatinate. He became a citizen of the city of Speyer. In 1546 he was appointed official court painter for Frederick II, Elector Palatine. After the death of Frederick in 1556, Besser continued as court painter to Otto Henry, Elector Palatine.

Besser was primarily a portrait painter. Before these portraits were detectable through documentation, attributions of his works were originally assigned to either Master of Pfalz or Master of Margrave. These names were given to the painter because of the frequent representation of the Palatinate princes. Besser demonstrated none of the leading visual style of the Renaissance in Germany. His cool portraits with their motionless poses and rigid facial expressions show a distant contemplation, which seems to follow a sober objectivity of Dutch painting of the period of the Reformation.
