= Giuseppe Niccolò Vicentino =

Italian painter

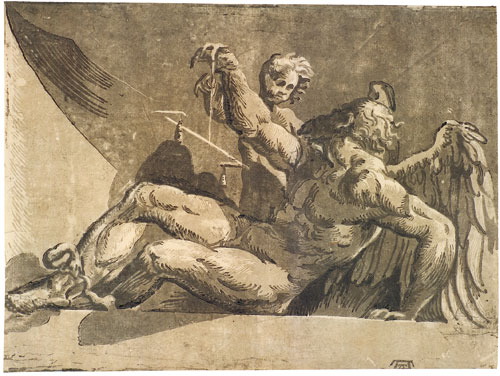
Giuseppe Niccolò Vicentino, Saturn, woodcut using four blocks in black and different grey tones

Giuseppe Niccolò Rospigliosi or Rossigliani, called Vicentino, was an Italian painter and wood-engraver of the Renaissance. He was born in Vicenza c. 1525 and worked in Bologna c. 1550 as a follower of Ugo da Carpi. He used the chiaroscuro method. He used three blocks and did much to develop the process. Among other cuts by him are: A Sibyl reading a Book; Hercules killing the Nemaean Lion after Raphael; Death of Ajax after Polidoro da Caravaggio; Venue embracing Cupid; and Glelia escaping from Porsenna's camp.
