= Francesco del Prato =

Italian painter

Francesco del Prato was an Italian still-life painter of the Renaissance period. He was first a goldsmith, but afterwards turned to painting, and put himself under the instruction of il Salviati. He died in 1562.
