= Nicolaes de Giselaer =

Dutch painter

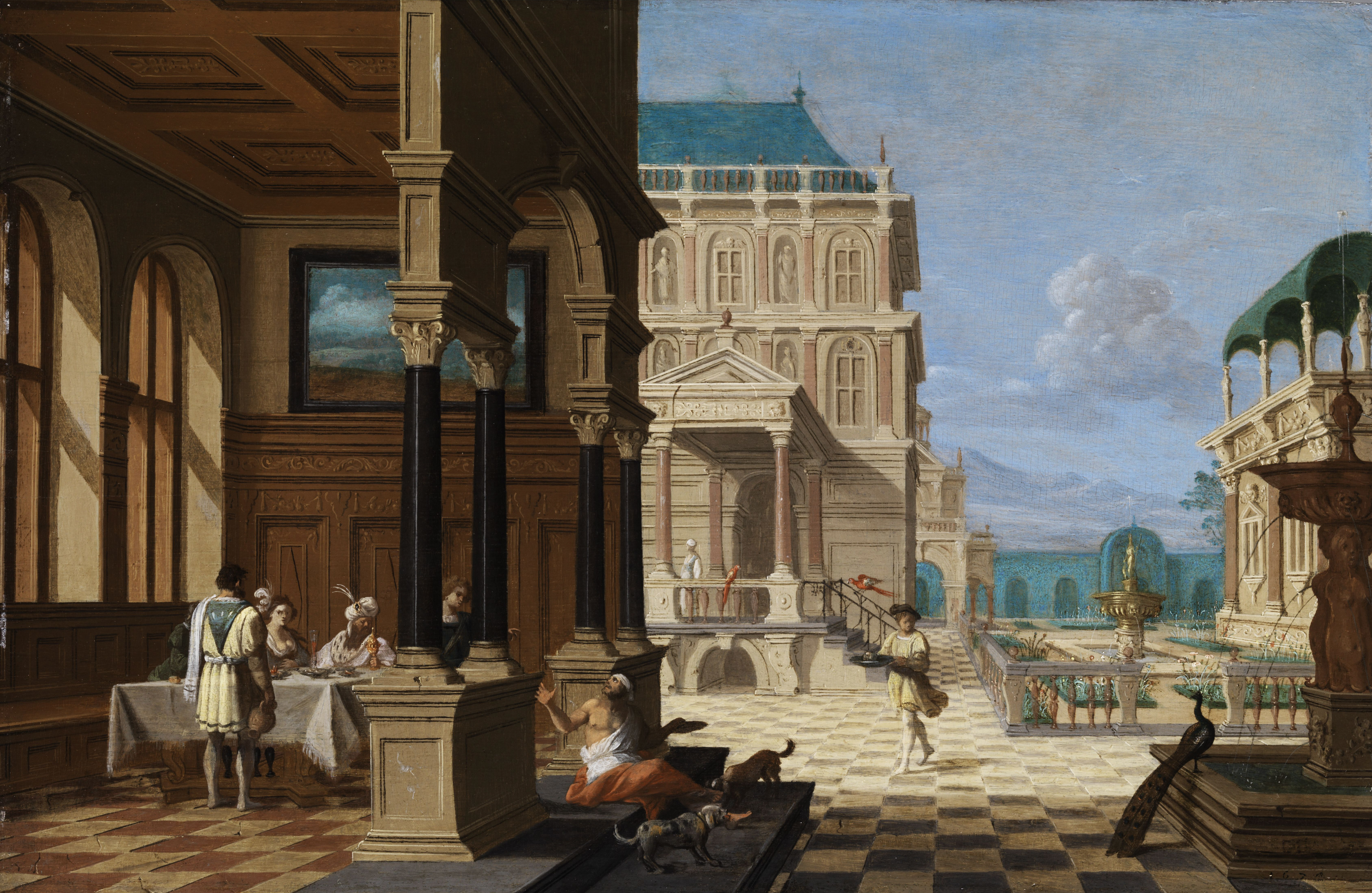
Palace Courtyard with Loggia and Figures by Nicolaes de Giselaer

Nicolaes de Giselaer, also Nicolaes de Geijselers, Nicolaes de Geyselers, Nicolaas de Gijselaer, Nicolaas de Gijzelaer, Nicolaes de Gyselaer, Nicolaas de Gyzelaer, Nicolaes de Ghyselaer (1583–1647) was a Dutch painter and draughtsman.

De Giselaer was born in Dordrecht. Not much is known about his life, except through his works. From records it is known he was born in Dordrecht, and worked in Leiden and Utrecht in 1616, and later Amsterdam between 1616-1617. He married Cornelia Cornelisdr. Van Riebeeck in Leiden on March 24th 1616 and later moved back to Utrecht, where he continued working until his death around 1654. The Centraal Museum has some of his works. He died in Utrecht where he was buried on February 8th 1647.
