= Jean Chartier (painter) =

French painter, draughtsman, and print publisher

Jean Chartier (1500–1580) was a French painter, draughtsman, and print publisher.

Chartier was known to be working in Orléans. His style suggests that he may have seen or been involved in the School of Fontainebleau.?
