= Miquel Bestard =

Spanish painter (1592–1633)

- Born: 1592
- Died: 1633 (aged 40–41)
- Occupation: Painter

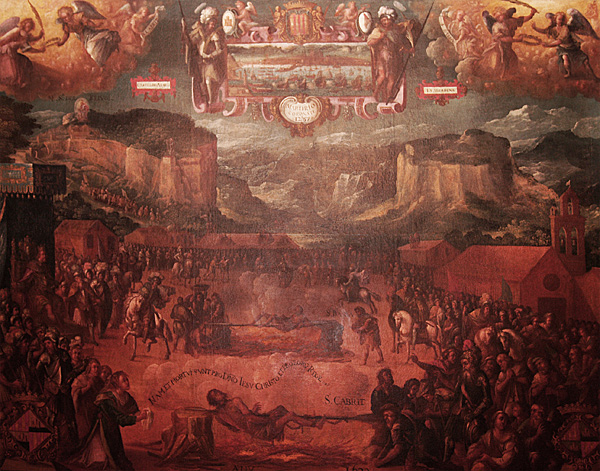
Martyrdom of Cabrit and Bassa by Bestard, c. 1629.

Miquel Bestard (1592–1633) was a Spanish painter from Majorca.
