= Pompeo Cesura =

Italian painter and engraver

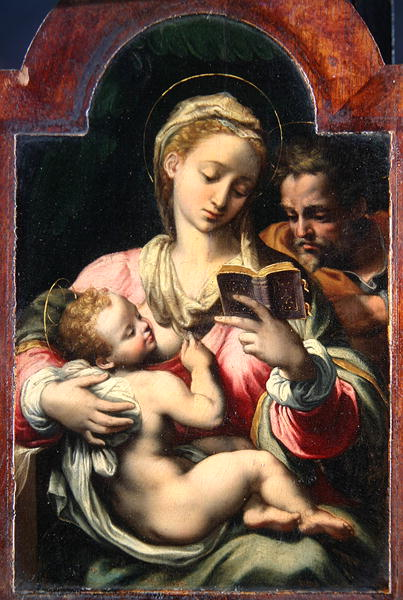
The Holy Family (c.1560–1573)

Pompeo Cesura (born c.1500–1571), also known as Pompeo Dall'Aquila or Pompeo Aquilano, was an Italian painter and engraver. It is stated in the 'Abecedario Pittorico' by Orlandi to have been a painter of history, specializing both in oil and fresco. He flourished in the latter part of the 16th century. There is a painting by him in the church of Santo Spirito in Sassia in Rome, representing the Deposition, which was engraved by Orazio de Santis in 1572. Several frescoes by him can be viewed in his birthplace of L'Aquila, Abruzzo.

He is also said to have painted the portrait of Raphael Sanzio used at the latter's funeral.
