= Niccolò Boldrini =

- Born: c.1500 Vicenza
- Died: c.1566
- Known for: Engraver
- Movement: Renaissance

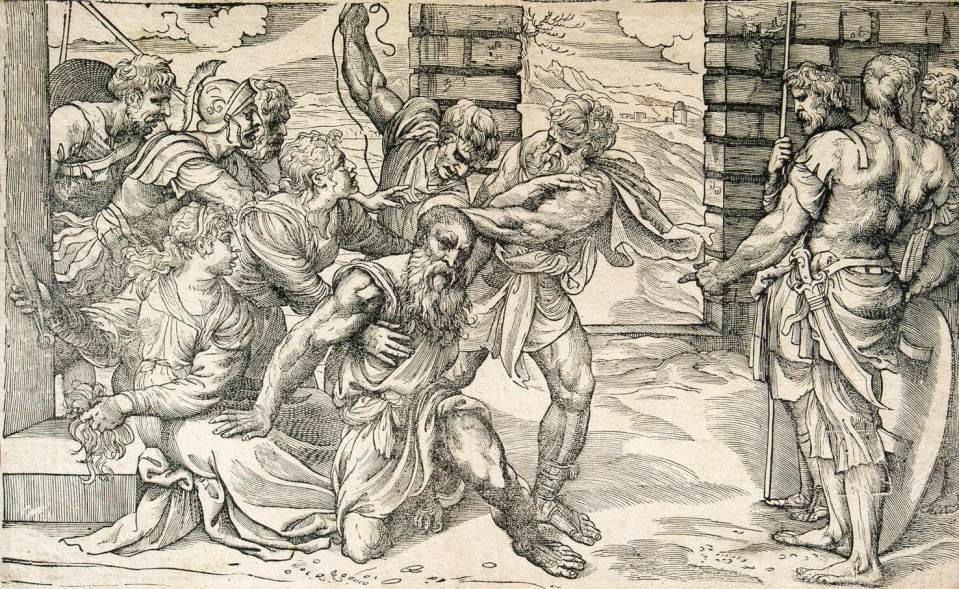
Samson and Delilah; by Niccolò Boldrini

Niccolò Boldrini (c.1500–c.1566) was an Italian engraver of the Renaissance. He was frequently confused with Nicola Vicentino. Boldrini was an engraver on wood, born at Vicenza in the early 16th century, and still living in 1566. His prints are chiefly after Titian, who may have been his master. He engraved John Baron de Schwarzenburg after Dürer and the following prints after Titian:

- The Wise Men's Offering
- St. Jerome praying in landscape
- Six Saints including Catharine & Sebastian
- Mountainous landscape with woman milking cow
- Venus seated on a bank holding Cupid
- Squirrel on a branch
