= Alessandro Bardelli =

Italian painter

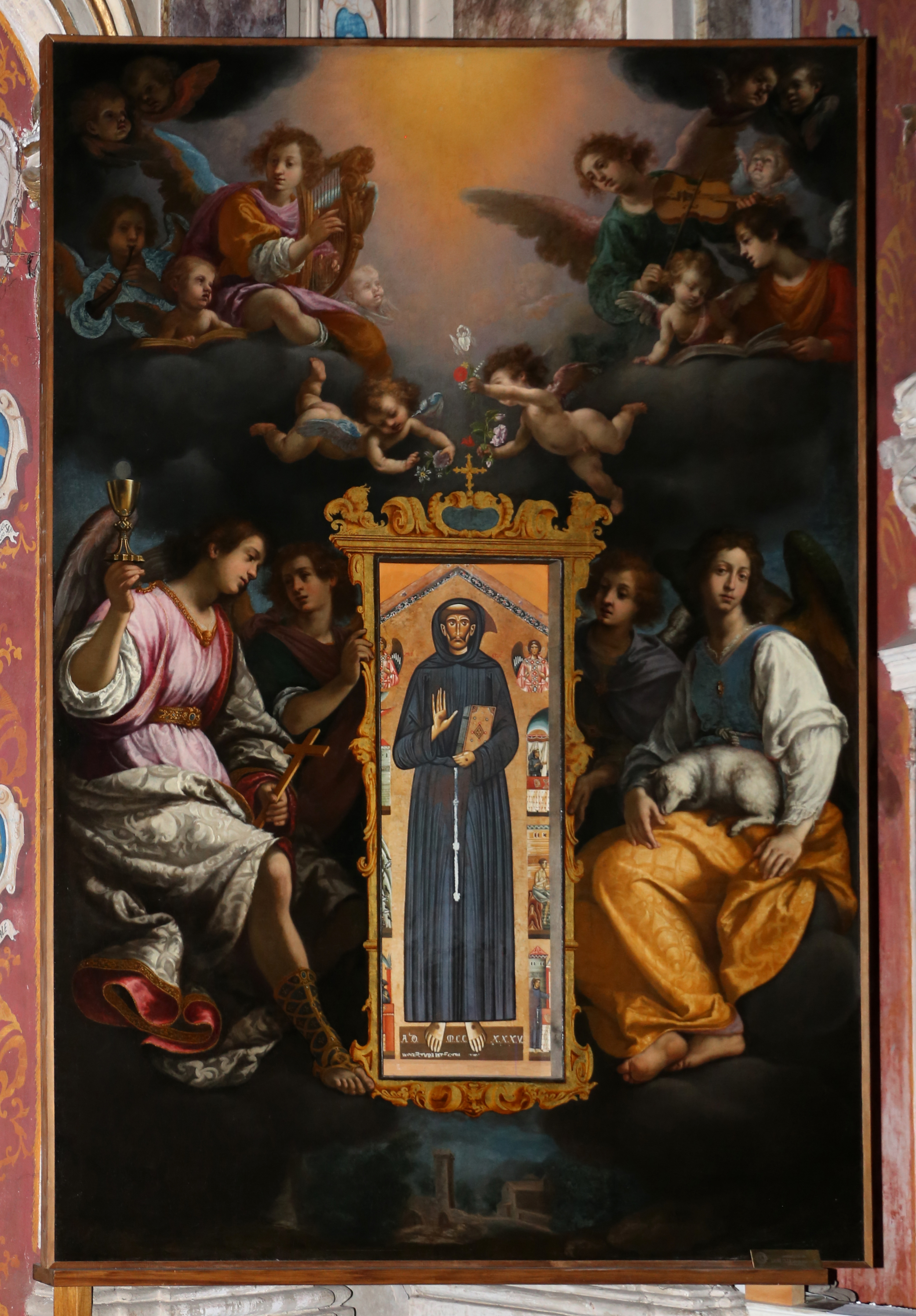
Glory of Angels Surrounding the Altar of Saint Francesco, 1624

Alessandro Bardelli (1583–1633) was an Italian painter of the Baroque period.

He was born in Uzzano near Pescia. He trained with the cavalier Francesco Currado and worked along Ludovico Cardi. Painted mainly in Pescia, including a fresco in the bishop's church. He painted a Archangel Raphael and Tobias returning sight to Tobias' father for the church of Santi Stefano e Niccolao in Pescia. He died in Bologna.
