= 1662 in art =

Events from the year 1662 in art.

== Events ==
- (unknown)

== Paintings ==
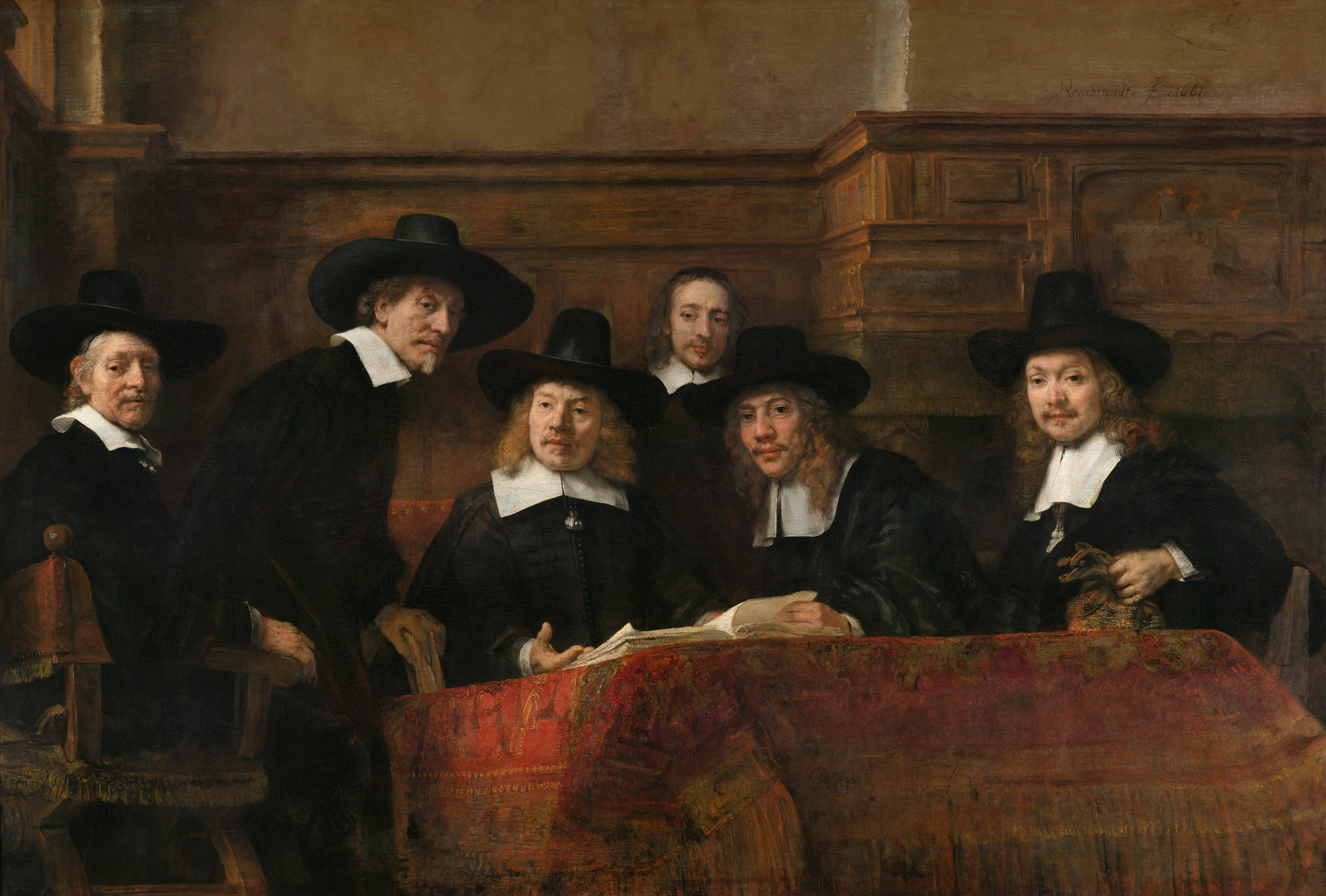
Rembrandt – The Sampling Officials

- Philippe de Champaigne – Ex-Voto de 1662
- Rembrandt
  - The Conspiracy of Claudius Civilis (1661–1662)
  - The Sampling Officials (Rijksmuseum Amsterdam)
  - Self-portrait as Zeuxis Laughing (c.)
- Samuel Dirksz van Hoogstraten – View Through a House (Dyrham Park)

== Births ==
- January - Michiel Maddersteg, Dutch painter (died 1708)
- February 9 - Paolo de Matteis, Italian painter working for the Spanish Viceroy of Naples (died 1728)
- May - Jan Frans van Bloemen, Flemish landscape painter (died 1740)
- June 3 - Willem Van Mieris, Dutch painter from Leyden (died 1747)
- July 20 - Andrea Brustolon, Italian sculptor in wood (died 1732)
- August 10 - Charles Boit, Swedish painter in vitreous enamels (died 1727)
- November 23 - Clemente de Torres, Spanish Baroque painter of Genoese origin (died 1730)
- date unknown
  - Panagiotis Doxaras, Greek painter who founded the Heptanese School of Greek art (died 1729)
  - Gaspard Duchange, French engraver (died 1757)
  - Perpète Evrard, Flemish painter of portraits and miniatures (died 1727)
  - Pierre Gobert, French painter (died 1744)
  - Joseph Christophe (or Christophle), French artist (died 1748)
  - André Jean, French artist (died 1753)
  - Giuseppe Antonio Torricelli, Italian sculptor and gem-engraver of the late Baroque, active in Florence (died 1719)
  - Girolamo Ruggieri, Italian painter of landscapes and battle paintings (died 1717)
  - Teresa Scannabecchi, Italian woman painter active in Bologna (died 1708)
  - Giuseppe Tortelli, Italian painter, active in Brescia (date of death unknown)

== Deaths ==
- June - Johannes Cornelisz Verspronck, Dutch portraitist (born 1600/1603)
- July - Pieter Holsteyn I, Dutch Golden Age painter, engraver and stained glass worker (born 1585)
- July 10 - Jan Jansz van de Velde, Dutch Golden Age painter (born 1620)
- September 21 - Adriaan van Stalbemt, Flemish painter (born 1580)
- November 12 - Adriaen van de Venne, Dutch Baroque painter of allegories, genre subjects and portraits (born 1589)
- date unknown
  - Georg Baresch, German antique collector (born 1585)
  - Giovanni Francesco Romanelli, Italian painter of frescoes (born 1610)
  - Vincenzo Spisanelli, Italian painter of altarpieces (born 1595)
  - Adriaen van Eemont, Dutch Golden Age painter (born 1626)
- probable
  - Francisco Lopez Caro, Spanish painter (born 1578)
  - Carlo Francesco Nuvolone, Italian painter (born c.1609)
  - Anthonie Jansz. van der Croos, Dutch painter (born c.1606)
  - Jacob Vrel, Dutch painter (born c.1630)
