= 1636 in art =

Events from the year 1636 in art.

== Events ==
- (unknown)

== Paintings ==
Rubens – An Autumn Landscape with a View of Het Steen in the Early Morning, National Gallery

- Orazio Gentileschi - Allegory of Peace and the Arts (ceiling for The Queen's House, Greenwich; now at Marlborough House, London)
- Nicolas Poussin
  - A Dance to the Music of Time (La Danse des Saisons; 1634-36)
  - The Triumph of Pan and The Triumph of Bacchus (decoration of Cardinal Richelieu's château) (1635-36)
- Rembrandt
  - Belshazzar's Feast (1635-36)
  - The Blinding of Samson (using chiaroscuro)
  - Susanna
  - ‘’Danae’’
- Jusepe de Ribera
  - Saint Sebastian
- Peter Paul Rubens
  - [[An Autumn Landscape with a View of Het Steen in the Early Morning]]
  - Hercules' Dog Discovers Purple Dye (sketch; approximate date)
  - The Judgement of Paris (first version; approximate date)
- Anthony van Dyck - Charles I in Three Positions (1635-36)

== Births ==
- March - Lancelot Volders, Flemish portrait painter (died 1723)
- November - Adriaen van de Velde, Dutch animal and landscape painter (died 1672)
- date unknown
  - Giovanni Battista Beinaschi, Italian painter and engraver active in the late-Renaissance period (died 1688)
  - Giovanni Coli, Italian painter from Lucca (died 1691)
  - Filippo Maria Galletti, Italian painter of religious works and a Theatine priest (died 1714)
  - Philippe Lallemand, French portrait painter (died 1716)
  - Agostino Lamma, Italian painter specializing in battle paintings (died 1700)
  - Antoine Masson, French line engraver (died 1700)
  - Tommaso Misciroli, Italian painter from Faenza (died 1699)
  - Catharina Oostfries, Dutch glass painter (died 1709)
  - Claudine Bouzonnet-Stella, French engraver (died 1697)
  - Giovanni Maria Viani, Italian painter and etcher (died 1700)
  - Zou Zhe, Chinese painter of the Qing Dynasty (died 1708)
- probable
  - Gerrit Battem, Dutch landscape painter (died 1684)
  - Étienne Baudet, French engraver (died 1711)
  - Jacob Gillig, Dutch Golden Age painter of still lifes, usually of fish, as well as portraits (died 1701)
  - Melchior d'Hondecoeter, Dutch painter of exotic birds in a park-like landscape (died 1695)
  - Francesco Vaccaro, Italian painter of landscapes and engraver (died 1675)
  - Antonio Verrio, Italian-born mural painter (died 1707)

== Deaths ==
- January 19 - Marcus Gheeraerts the Younger, Artist of the Tudor court, portraitist (born 1561/1562)
- January 22 - Gregorio Fernández, Spanish sculptor Castilian school of sculpture (born 1576)
- April 6 - Philipp Uffenbach, German painter and etcher (born 1566)
- June 27 - Lambert Jacobsz, Dutch painter (born 1598)
- October 10 – Pieter Brueghel the Younger, painter (born 1564)
- December 6 - Giovanni da San Giovanni, Italian painter (born 1592)
- date unknown
  - Giovanni Battista Billoni, Italian painter born in Padua (born 1576)
  - Pietro Paolo Bonzi, Italian painter, best known for his landscapes and still-lifes (born 1576)
  - Dong Qichang, Chinese painter, scholar, calligrapher, and art theorist of the later period of the Ming Dynasty (born 1555)
  - Giovanni Giacomo Pandolfi, Italian painter who worked in his native Pesaro (born 1567)
  - Niccolò Roccatagliata, Italian sculptor (born 1593)
  - Wen Zhenmeng, Chinese Ming Dynasty painter, calligrapher, scholar, author, and garden designer (born 1574)
  - Filippo Zaniberti, Italian Mannerist painter (born 1585)
