= 1643 in art =

Events from the year 1643 in art.

== Events ==
- Painter Peter Lely moves from Haarlem to London at about this date.

== Works ==
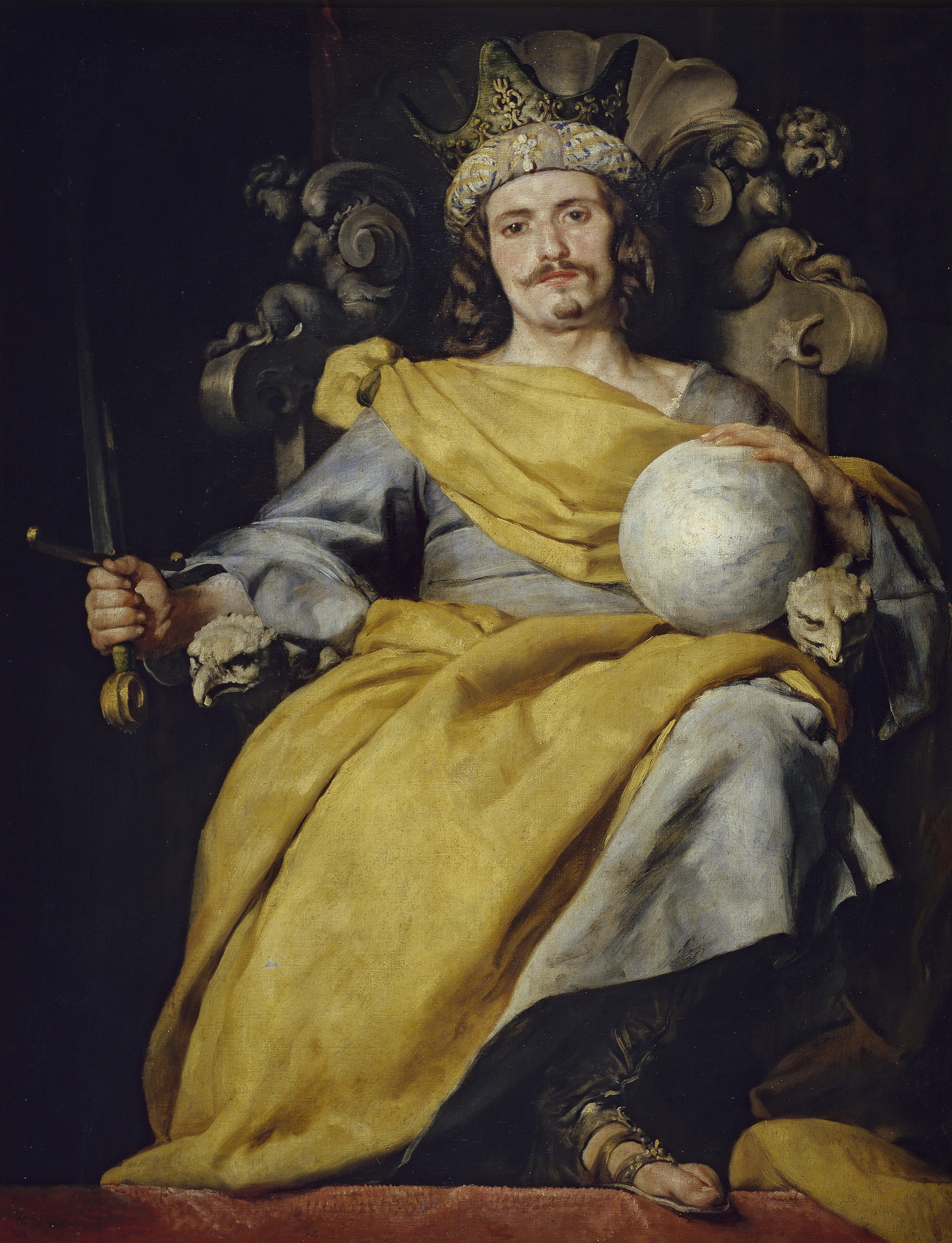
Cano, Ideal portrait of a Spanish King

- Sébastien Bourdon – A Brawl in a Guard-room (Dulwich Picture Gallery; approximate date)
- Alonso Cano – Ideal portrait of a Spanish King
- William Dobson
  - Portrait of an Old and a Younger Man (John Taylor and John Denham)
  - Portrait of Lord Byron
- Jan van Goyen – An Evening River Landscape with a Ferry
- Cornelius Johnson – Major-General Sir William Waller
- Rembrandt
  - The Artist's Wife, Saskia (Gemäldegalerie, Berlin)
  - Landscape with a Castle (Musée du Louvre)
  - Portrait of an Old Man (or The Old Rabbi; Woburn Abbey, England)
  - The Three Trees (etching)
- Diego Velázquez – Self-portrait (Uffizi; approximate date)

== Births ==
- 7 December – Giovanni Battista Falda, Italian engraver especially of contemporary and antique structures in Rome (died 1678)
- date unknown
  - Juan de Alfaro y Gamez, Spanish painter of the Baroque (died 1680)
  - Giovanni Battista Buonocore, Italian painter (died 1699)
  - Filippo Gherardi – Italian painter of frescoes (died 1704)
  - Ludovico Gimignani, Italian painter, active mainly in Rome, during the Baroque period (died 1697)
  - Luigi Quaini, Italian painter of landscapes and architecture (died 1717)
  - Pandolfo Reschi, Polish-born Italian painter of battle scenes and landscapes (died 1699)
  - Orazio Marinali, Italian late-baroque sculptor, active mainly in Veneto (died 1720)
  - Gottfried Schalken, Dutch painter (died 1706)

== Deaths ==
- April – Abraham Bosschaert, Dutch painter (born 1612)
- December 30 – Giovanni Baglione, Italian painter and historian of art (born 1566)
- date unknown
  - Jean Chalette, French miniature and portrait painter (born 1581)
  - Belisario Corenzio, Italian Mannerist painter (born 1558)
  - Guillaume Dupré, French sculptor and medallist (born 1574)
  - Cornelis Jacobsz Delff, Dutch painter (born 1570)
- probable
  - Cheng Jiasui, Chinese landscape painter and poet during the Ming Dynasty (born 1565)
  - Ottavio Vannini, Italian painter of altarpieces and churches, active mainly in Florence (born 1585)
