= 1708 in art =

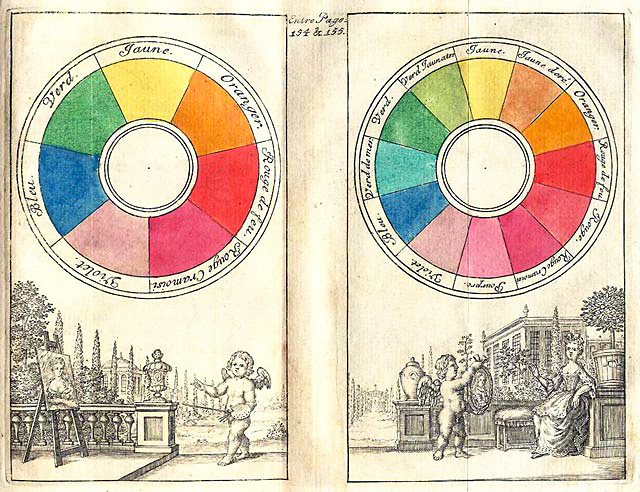
Claude Boutet's 7-color and 12-color color circles, c.1708

Events from the year 1708 in art.

== Events ==
- Flemish painter and engraver Pieter Casteels III comes to work in Britain.
- Czech sculptor Ferdinand Brokoff sets up his own studio.

== Paintings ==
- Michael Dahl – Portrait of George Mackenzie, 1st Earl of Cromartie
- Antonino Grano – Frescoes in Church of Santa Maria della Pietà in Kalsa, Palermo
- Godfrey Kneller – Portrait of John Smith
- Enoch Seeman
  - Group portrait of the Bisset family
  - Self-portrait

== Drawings ==
- Portrait of Anne Hathaway by Nathaniel Curzon

== Publications ==
- Roger de Piles – Cours de peinture par principes avec un balance de peintres

== Births ==
- January 25 – Pompeo Girolamo Batoni, Italian painter (died 1787)
- June 20 – François-Elie Vincent, Swiss painter of portrait miniatures (died 1790)
- December 18 – John Collier, English caricaturist and satirist (died 1786)
- date unknown
  - Francis Hayman, English painter and illustrator (died 1776)
  - Giuseppe Ghedini, Italian painter and later a university professor of painting (died 1791)
  - Mina Kolokolnikov, Russian painter and teacher (died 1775)
  - Johann Jakob Zeiller, Austrian fresco painter (died 1783)

== Deaths ==
- April – Abraham Storck, Dutch landscape and marine painter (born 1644)
- April 6 – Willem van Ingen, Dutch Golden Age painter active in Italy (born 1651)
- April 19 – Angiola Teresa Moratori Scanabecchi, Italian woman composer and painter active in Bologna (born 1662)
- June 10 – Romeyn de Hooghe, Dutch engraver and caricaturist (born 1645)
- August 16 – Michel Corneille the Younger, French painter, etcher and engraver (born 1642)
- September 6 – Evert Collier, Dutch painter (born 1640)
- October 22 – Cesare Pronti, Italian painter of quadratura and allegorical figures (born 1626)
- October 26 – Johann Kerseboom, German portrait painter (born unknown)
- November 17 – Ludolf Bakhuysen, Dutch painter (born 1630)
- November 20 – Paul Strudel, Austrian sculptor, architect, engineer and painter (born 1648)
- date unknown
  - Giovanni Ventura Borghese, Italian painter (born 1640)
  - Francesco Ferrari, Italian painter and architect (born 1634)
  - Catharina Oostfries, Dutch glass painter (born 1636)
  - Paolo Antonio Paderna, Italian painter of Bologna (born 1649)
  - Jan van Kessel the Younger, Flemish painter active in Spain (born 1654)
- probable
  - Michiel Maddersteg, Dutch painter (born 1662)
  - Pietro da Pietri, Italian painter of an altarpiece for Santa Maria in Via Lata (born 1663)
  - Zou Zhe, Chinese Qing dynasty painter (born 1636)
