= 1699 in art =

Events from the year 1699 in art.

== Events ==
- The Académie Royale de Peinture et de Sculpture holds the first of a series of salons at the Louvre Palace.

== Paintings ==
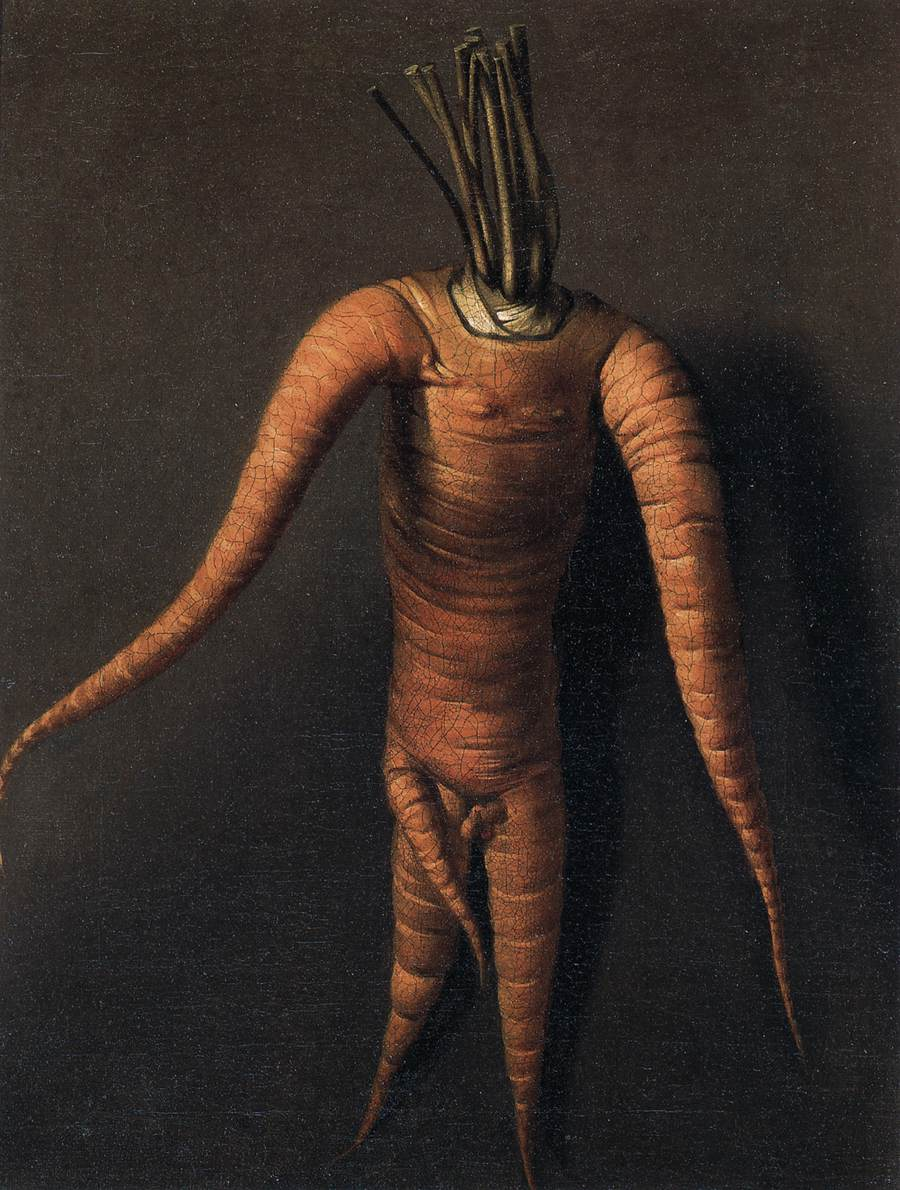
Willem van Royen – The Carrot

- Alexis Simon Belle – Allegorical portrait of James Francis Edward Stuart and his sister Louisa Maria Teresa Stuart
- Alexandre-François Desportes – The artist as a hunter (approximate date)
- Willem Frederiksz van Royen – The Carrot
- The Kangxi Emperor of China at age 45 (silk painting)
- Monastery of Moisei, Romania (icons)

== Births ==
- February 15 – Giovanni Maria Morlaiter, Italian Rococo sculptor (died 1781)
- February 17 – Georg Wenzeslaus von Knobelsdorff, Prussian painter and architect (died 1753)
- March 26 – Hubert-François Gravelot, French illustrator (died 1773)
- May 28 – Laurent Cars, French designer and engraver (died 1771)
- October – Giuseppe Grisoni, Italian painter (died 1769)
- November 2 – Jean-Baptiste-Siméon Chardin, French painter (died 1779)
- November 25 – Pierre Subleyras, French painter, active during the late-Baroque and early-Neoclassic period (died 1749)
- date unknown
  - Giovanni Antonio Capello, Italian painter (died 1741)
  - Giovanni Antonio Guardi, also known as Gianantonio Guardi, Italian painter, 1756 co-founder of the Venetian Academy (died 1760)
  - Giuseppe Marchesi, Italian painter active mainly in Bologna (died 1771)
  - Giuseppe Nogari, Venetian painter of the Rococo, where he painted mainly half-body portraits (died 1763)
  - Alexis Peyrotte, French decorator painter (died 1769)
  - Giovanni Agostino Ratti, Italian cabinet painter, engraver, and constructed scenography (died 1755)
  - Ivan Vishnyakov, Russian painter (died 1761)
- probable (born 1699/1707) – Stefano Pozzi, Italian painter, designer, draughtsman and decorator (died 1768)
- probable (born 1699/1710) – Hristofor Zhefarovich, Serbian and Bulgarian painter, engraver and writer (died 1753)

== Deaths ==
- January 3 – Mattia Preti, Italian Baroque artist who worked in Italy and Malta (born 1613)
- May – Lucas Achtschellinck, Flemish landscape painter (born 1626)
- May 22 – Giovanni Battista Buonocore, Italian painter (born 1643)
- October 8 (bur.) – Mary Beale, English portrait painter (born 1633)
- date unknown
  - Tommaso Misciroli, Italian painter from Faenza (born 1636)
  - Pandolfo Reschi, Polish-born Italian painter of battle scenes and landscapes (born 1643)
  - Pedro Roldán, Spanish sculptor (born 1624)
- possible – Joannes van der Brugghen, Flemish Baroque painter and engraver (born 1649)
