= 1717 in art =

Events from the year 1717 in art.

== Events ==
- April 13 – Thomas Coke purchases a marble statue of Artemis/Diana dated to 190–200 AD, believed to be a copy of a mid 4th century BC Hellenistic original, for 900 crowns, making it the most expensive item he acquired for the art collections of Holkham Hall.

== Paintings ==
Watteau – Embarkation for Cythera

- Charles Jervas – Portrait of Isaac Newton
- Jean-Marc Nattier – Portraits of Peter the Great and Catherine I of Russia
- Enoch Seeman – Portrait of Elihu Yale
- Antoine Watteau
  - The Embarkation for Cythera
  - Les plaisirs du bal (approximate date)

== Statues ==
- Equestrian statue of George I in Birmingham by John Nost

== Births ==
- February 14 – Jan Palthe, Dutch portrait painter (died 1769)
- February 17 – Adam Friedrich Oeser, German etcher, painter and sculptor (died 1799)
- April 23 – Pieter Barbiers, Dutch painter (died 1780)
- May 4 - Jean-Charles François, French engraver (died 1769)
- June 20 – Jacques Saly, French sculptor (died 1776)
- August 11 – Giovanni Carlo Galli-Bibiena, Italian architect, designer, and painter (died 1760)
- December 4 – Norbert Grund, Czech painter of the Rococo style (died 1767)
- date unknown
  - Giuseppe Bottani, Italian painter active in the Baroque period (died 1784)
  - Alexander Cozens, British landscape-painter in water-colours and published teacher of painting (died 1786)
  - Robert Wood, British engraver, gentleman and politician (died 1771)

== Deaths ==
- January 16 – Elias Brenner, Swedish painter and archeologist (born 1647)
- February 18 – Giovanni Maria Morandi, Italian painter of altarpieces (born 1622)
- April 5 – Jean Jouvenet, French painter (born 1647)
- April 8 - Antoine Benoist, French painter and sculptor (born 1632)
- May 7 – Bon Boullogne, French painter (born 1649)
- November 21 – Jean-Baptiste Santerre, French painter (born 1650)
- date unknown
  - Luigi Quaini, Italian painter of landscapes and architecture (born 1643)
  - Carlo Antonio Rambaldi, Italian painter of the Baroque period (born 1680)
  - Girolamo Ruggieri, Italian painter of landscapes and battle paintings (born 1662)
  - John Slezer, Dutch- or German-born military engineer and artist (born 1650)
  - Wang Hui, Chinese landscape painter, the best known of the Four Wangs (born 1632)
