= 1576 in art =

Events from the year 1576 in art.

== Works ==
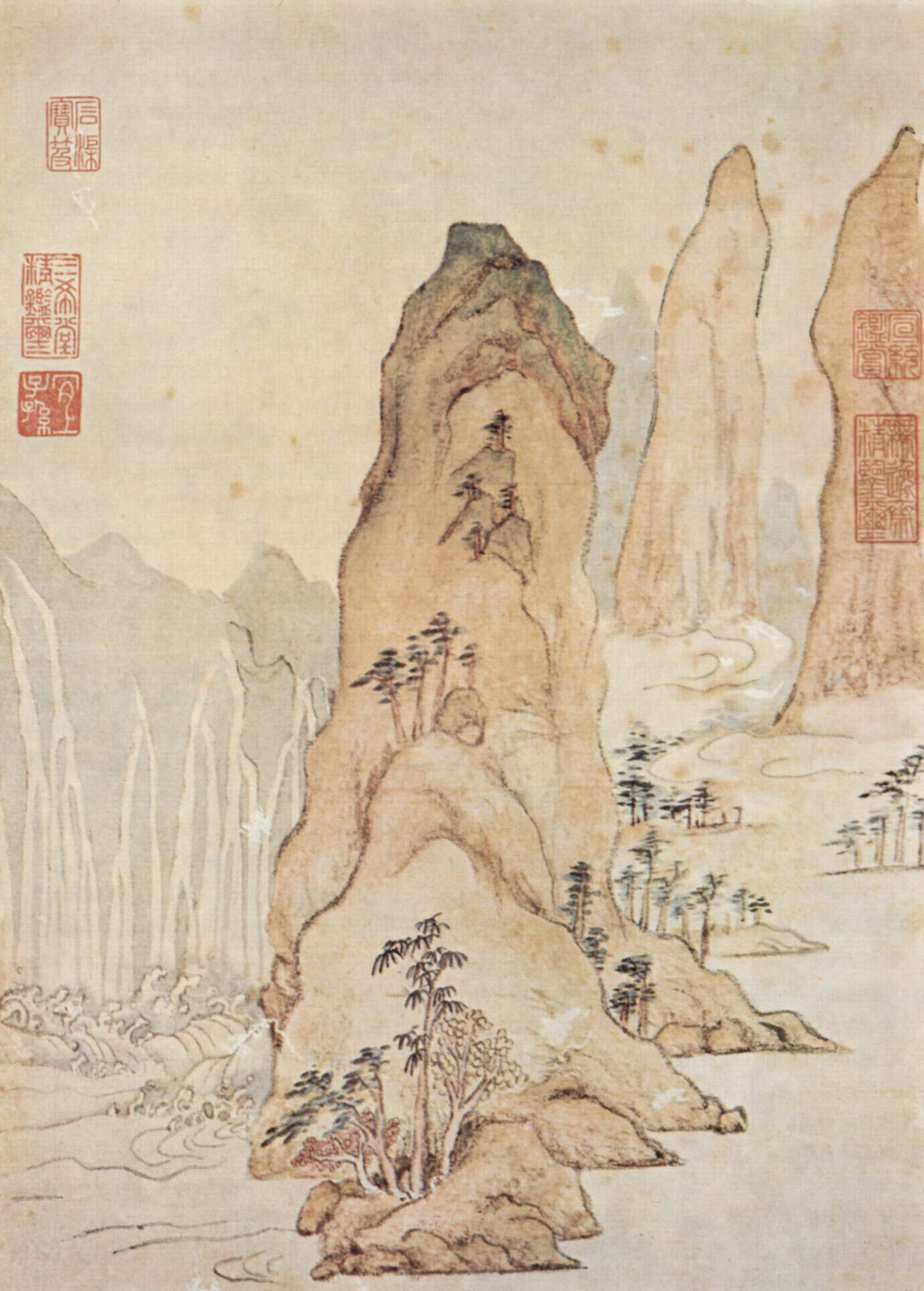
Wen – Landscape in the Spirit of the Verses of Du Fu, National Palace Museum

- Lavinia Fontana - Christ with the Symbols of the Passion
- Wen Jia – Landscape in the Spirit of the Verses of Du Fu

== Births ==
- June 16 - Giovanni Battista Viola, Italian painter of landscape canvases (died 1622)
- August - David Vinckboons, Dutch painter of Flemish origin (died 1632)
- September 1 - Scipione Borghese, Italian art collector (died 1633)
- date unknown
  - Santino Solari, Italian architect and sculptor (died 1646)
  - Roelant Savery, Flanders-born Dutch baroque painter of the Golden Age (died 1633)
  - Gregorio Fernández, Spanish sculptor Castilian school of sculpture (died 1636)
  - Francisco Herrera the Elder, Spanish painter and founder of the Seville school for the arts (died 1656)
  - Giovanni Battista Billoni, Italian painter born in Padua (died 1636)
  - Leonello Spada, Italian Caravaggisti specializing in decorative quadratura painting (died 1622)
- probable
  - Cornelis Boel, Flemish draughtsman and engraver (died 1621)
  - Pietro Paolo Bonzi, Italian painter, best known for his landscapes and still-lifes (died 1636)
  - Cornelis Claesz van Wieringen, Dutch Golden Age painter (died 1633)

== Deaths ==
- February 22 - Bernardino Gatti, Italian painter (born c.1495)
- May 26 - Vincenzo Danti, Italian sculptor (born 1530)
- August 27 – Titian, leader of the 16th-century Venetian school of the Italian Renaissance (born 1485)
- November 27 - Santi Buglioni, Italian sculptor (born 1494)
- date unknown
  - Pieter Claeissens the Elder, Flemish painter (born 1500)
  - Aqa Mirak, Persian illustrator and painter (born unknown)
  - Lorenzo Sabbatini, Italian Mannerist painter (born c.1530)
  - Levina Teerlinc, Flemish miniaturist who served as a painter to the English court (born 1510/1520)
  - Lu Zhi, Chinese landscape painter, calligrapher, and poet during the Ming Dynasty (born c.1496)
