= Arcangelo Resani =

Italian painter (1670–1740)

Arcangelo Resani (1670 – 1740) was an Italian painter of the Baroque period. He was born at Rome, Papal States and was a pupil of Giovanni Battista Boncuore. He chiefly excelled in painting animals and hunted game. His simple realistic works were highly esteemed at Siena, Bologna, and Venice. His portrait, with dead game in the background, is in the Uffizi collection.

== Biography ==
The date of Resani's birth is unsure, and could be 1668 rather than 1670, the date traditionally given by his biographers. However, the inscription on the back of a Self-portrait (Vienna, Homme priv. col.), probably not in the artist’s hand but certainly from an early date, seems to confirm the year of the painter’s birth as 1670 : Arcangelus Resanus pictor celeberrimus pinxit se ipsum anno 1724, aetatis suae 54.

Resani studied first under the Abruzzese painter Giovanni Battista Buonocore ( 1643–99 ); then he left his native Rome and at the age of 19 moved to Bologna, then to Forlì and later to Ravenna. He worked chiefly in Emilia and in Romagna. Indeed, his canvases reveal a highly cultivated figurative style, linked to the Roman tradition of the Bamboccianti and also to elements of the Lombard pictorial style, in particular the work of Giacomo Ceruti, and to certain refinements in the work of the Bolognese painter Giuseppe Crespi. Moreover, some paintings by Resani, such as the Peasant Girl (Faenza, priv. col.), bear similarities to the work of the painter from the Marches, Antonio Amorosi, who was a pupil of Giuseppe Ghezzi.

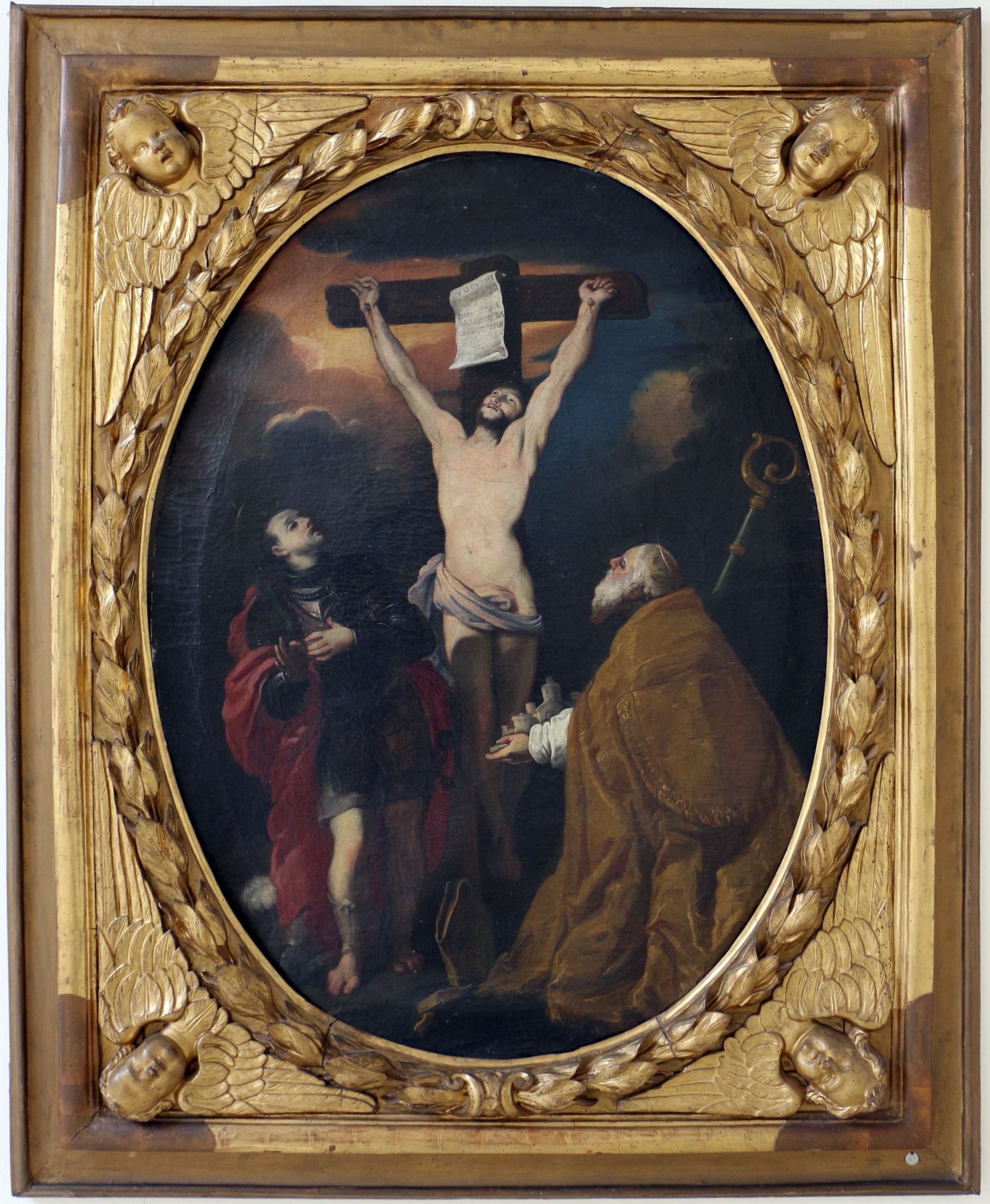
Arcangelo Resani, Crocifissione coi ss. Vitale e Apollinare (Museo d'arte della città di Ravenna)

Resani is best known as a painter of still-lifes and Arcadian genre scenes. His paintings are characterized by a highly personal and easily recognizable style. Although his work is simple, it never degenerates into facile reproduction, and displays a constant element of realism. In the still-lifes, thick brushstrokes that give the objects a physical quality alternate with rapid and nervous strokes capable of depicting the smallest details and the most variegated colour combinations, as in his treatment of birds’ plumage. Resani was adept at rendering the humble and rustic elements of domestic and family scenes with fresh immediacy, within balanced and organic compositions. For example, a feature of almost all his paintings is the woven straw basket, which is portrayed as an object of craftsmanship, an element that in turn has become a key to recognizing a work by Resani. Good examples are found in paintings such as the Sleeping Dog with a Basket (Faenza, Pinacoteca Comunale). Resani’s Self-portrait (c. 1713; Florence, Uffizi), the Poultry-man (Bologna, priv. col.) and Platter with Dead Partridge (Faenza, Pinacoteca Comunale) are considered among his finest works.

His canvases, most of which depict animals and shepherds, were much appreciated, even by other painters such as Carlo Cignani. He was also a friend of Giampietro Zanotti, who dedicated a biography to him. The number of works by the artist that were owned by private individuals and collectors in Faenza provides further proof of the high esteem in which he was held by contemporaries. On 14 June 1722 he was elected a member of the Accademia di Belle Arti di Bologna.

Resani occasionally worked on religious subjects, producing altar paintings for churches in Ravenna and Forlì. These included St. Gregory and the Souls in Purgatory for the church of the Suffragio, Ravenna, and the Virgin and Child with St. Francis and the Blessed Marco Fantuzzi for San Francesco, Ravenna. Only one religious painting survives: the altarpiece depicting the Blessed Bertrand and St. Rosa da Lima in San Domenico in Ravenna. The fresco with the Assumption of the Virgin in the dome of Santa Maria Foris Portam in Faenza was destroyed when the Benedictine basilica collapsed in 1782.

== Partial Anthology ==
- Piccioni nel nido
- Cane e sporta
- Piccione morto
- Pernice e piatto
