= Pontremoli Cathedral =

Cathedral in Pontremoli, Tuscany, Italy

Coordinates: 44.3777°N 9.8827°E

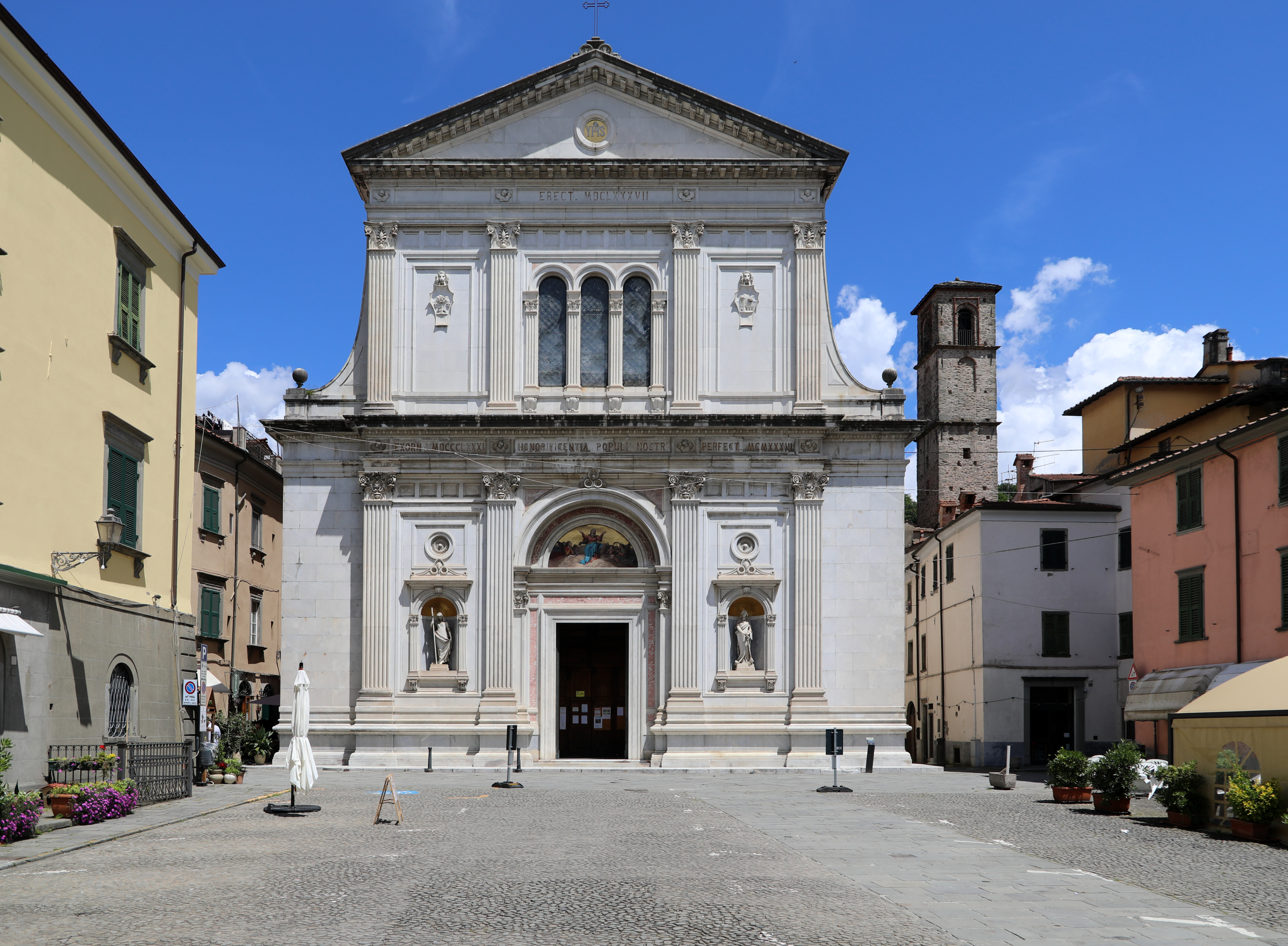
Facade of cathedral

Pontremoli Cathedral (Italian: Duomo di Pontremoli; Concattedrale di Santa Maria Assunta, also Santa Maria del Popolo) is a Roman Catholic cathedral in Pontremoli, region of Tuscany, Italy. From 1787 to 1988 it was the episcopal seat of the Diocese of Pontremoli; since 1988 it has been a co-cathedral in the Diocese of Massa Carrara-Pontremoli. Saint Geminianus and saint Rose of Lima are the co-owners of the cathedral and the co-patrons of the city.

== History ==
As an ex-voto of gratitude to the Virgin for the waning of the plague of 1622, the present church was erected between 1636 and 1687 using designs by the architect Alessandro Capra. On July 7, 1630, the General Council of the city deliberated to build up a temple in honour of the Madonna del Popolo in a place where previously existed a Marian church.

The Neo-Renaissance style facade was erected in 1926 by the architect Vincenzo Micheli.

The interior was frescoed by Francesco Natali with later artists adding stucco decoration. The church has a 13th-century icon of the Madonna del Popolo who is raffigurated as a Black Madonna.

Among the paintings in the church are the following:

- Birth of the Virgin by Giandomenico Ferretti
- Visitation by Vincenzo Meucci
- Marriage of the Virgin by Giuseppe Peroni
- Annunciation by Giuseppe Bottani
