= Garden of Cultivation =

The Garden of Cultivation
UNESCO World Heritage Site
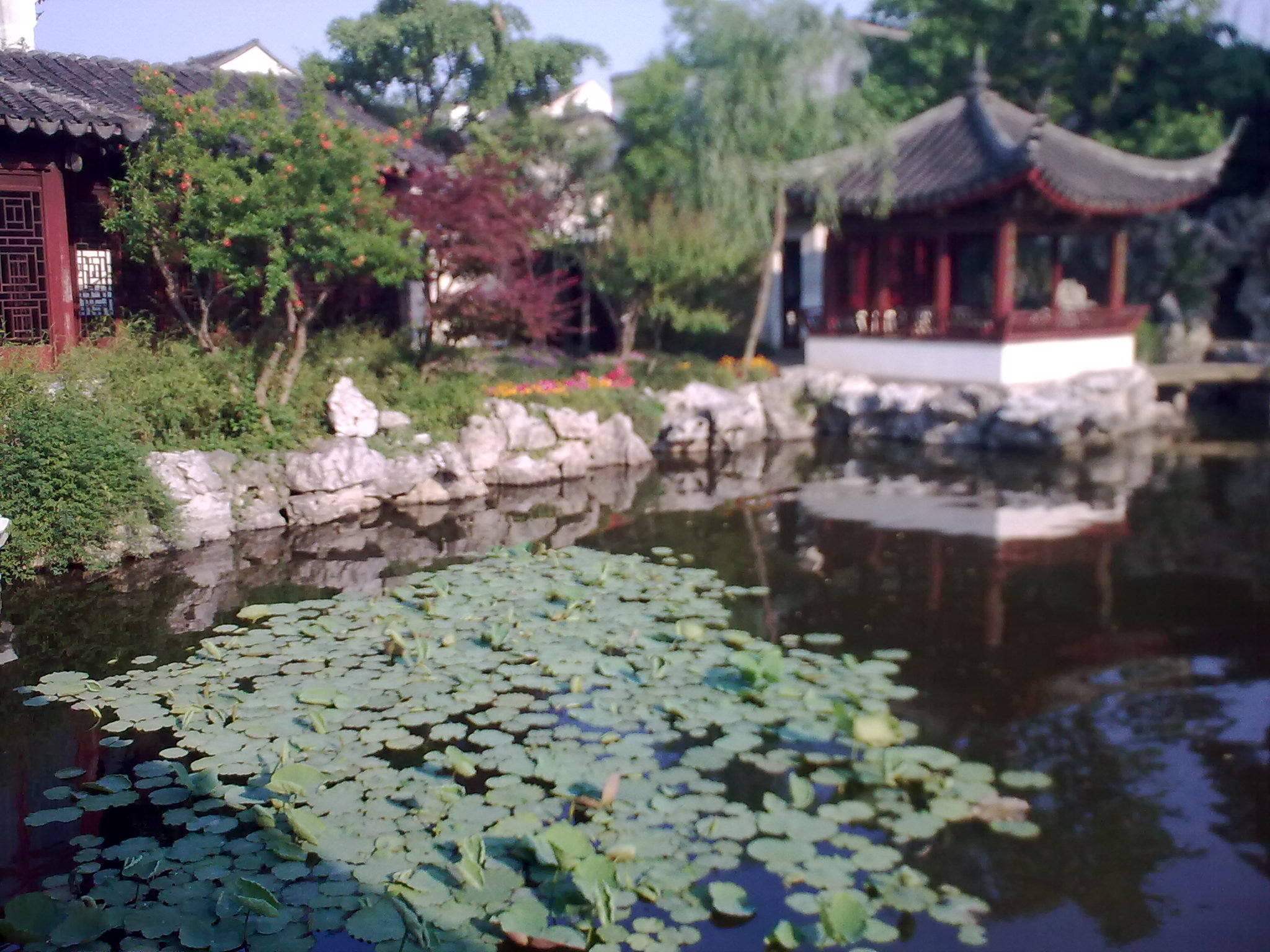
- Ming Dynasty Pavilion

- Location within Jiangsu Location within China
- Location: Suzhou, Jiangsu, China
- Part of: Classical Gardens of Suzhou
- Criteria: Cultural: (i)(ii)(iii)(iv)(v)
- Reference: 813bis-007
- Inscription: 1997 (21st Session)
- Extensions: 2000
- Area: 0.38 ha (0.94 acres)
- Buffer zone: 1.117 ha (2.76 acres)
- Coordinates: 31°18′54.9″N 120°36′17.0″E

Garden of Cultivation
- Simplified Chinese: 艺圃
- Traditional Chinese: 藝圃
Transcriptions
Standard Mandarin
- Hanyu Pinyin: Yì Pǔ
- IPA: [î pʰù]
Wu
- Suzhounese: gni^{6} phu^{3} [ȵi pʰu]
Yue: Cantonese
- Yale Romanization: Ngaih Póu
- Jyutping: Ngai^{6} Pou^{2}
- IPA: [ŋɐj˨ pʰɔw˧˥]

The Garden of Cultivation (Chinese: 艺圃; pinyin: Yì Pǔ) is one of the best preserved examples of a Ming Dynasty classical garden in Suzhou. It is part of the Classical Gardens of Suzhou on UNESCO World Heritage Site list. "Due to its special history, this Garden was virtually unknown before it was listed as a UN World Cultural Heritage site."

== History ==
The Garden of Cultivation was built in 1541 CE by Yuan Zugeng (袁祖庚, 1519–1590), at that time it was called the Hall of Delights. In 1620 CE, it was purchased by Wen Zhenmeng (1574-1638), grandson of Wen Zhengming, the designer of the Humble Administrator's Garden, "a celebrated master painter in China's history, and [who] served as the prime minister in the late Ming Dynasty". Wen Zhenmeng rebuilt the garden and renamed it Herb Garden (yaopu). In 1659 CE, it was rebuilt again by Jiang Cai, "a respected scholar and minister of Foreign Affairs during the late Ming Dynasty, who protested against corruption by exiling himself" and renamed Jingting Mountain Villa. Jiang Cai added a grove of fig trees. His son Jiang Shijie inherited the garden and renamed it Cultivation Garden after adding the chapel of Guanyin. In 1839 CE it was transferred to the Qixiang Office of the Saint and Silk company. In 2000 it was inscribed on the UNESCO World Heritage List.

The garden received great acclaim in the Qing Dynasty because "all three owners...were scholars known for their integrity". Wang Wan wrote, "enclosing walls keep the worldly uproars outside; seclusion makes the inside of the house resemble a country villa; branches of date trees are heavy with fruit over the house; the pond surface is decorated with green duckweed and red lotus."

== Design ==
The 3,967 m^{2} garden is divided into an eastern section of residence and a western garden section. Altogether the garden has 13 pavilions, 17 tablets, and 8 stelae. The Western section is composed of several pavilions around the main Lotus Pond, a rockery, and a smaller garden addition named The Garden of Sweet Grasses. The structure of the garden is formed along a north to south axis which ties the three main elements of rockery, pool, and hall together. This style of composition is also used in the Mountain Villa with Embraced Beauty. The overall design is the simplest expression of a classical garden, there is one dominant composition, the Longevity Hall, and its associated view. The 700 m^{2} Lotus Pond is square with two water tails to give the illusion of infinite size. These tails are crossed by Fish Viewing Bridge and Ferrying Beauty Bridge. The former is a three-step arched bridge adjacent to the Fry Pavilion. The latter is a natural stone bridge at the entry to the Sweet Grass Garden. The Garden of Sweet Grasses is a scaled down version of the main garden and consists of the Sweet Grass House and Bathing Gull Pond as well as a smaller rockery. This area is the herb (sweet grass) garden added by Wen Zhenheng. It is meant to evoke his principle of "to leave residents free from worries, make tenants unwilling to leave, and enable visitors to throw off their tiredness". The garden is very typical of the Ming Dynasty design aesthetic because of its clear composition in plan and the elegance and simplicity of its elements.

Garden Design Elements with Description
Eastern garden
Wen Ya Alley It is an extension of a preexisting alley anchored by two Ming style gatehouses on either end. The Major Gatehouse, a three bay hall, connects to the street.
The Minor Gatehouse A one bay hall which anchors the other end of the Wen Ya Alley to the garden and the residence.
The Loveable Lotus Nest Based on The History of Jin.
The Thatched Cottage of Donglai This three bay hall was built in memory of the owner's hometown Yanglai county, Shandong. The post capitals are decorated with auspicious cloud carvings.
Millet Cake Studio A two bay tower, named by Jiang Cai to remember his bitter past.
Western Garden
Fry Pavilion A Pavilion from the original Ming Dynasty garden. It was used to watch fish in Lotus Pond.
Hall of Erudition and Elegance A five bay hall, located behind Longevity Pavilion.
Sound of Moon Veranda An attached square Pavilion with a hipped gable roofline and flying eves. It was used for moon gazing. It formed part of an overall composition including an open window planted with bamboo, a scholar stone meant to resemble a young girl, a couplet.
Chenggu Valley Study A hall named after the a mythical Chenggu Valley from which the sun rose.
Refreshing Morning Pavilion A hexagonal detached Pavilion located atop of the rockery. The pillar couplets read, "A walk in the morning sun feasts one's eyes on a blooming spring; A climb to the mountain refreshes one's mind with limpid water".
Memory of Liking Hall A three ball hall with full gables. It functioned as a chapel of Guanyin built by An Jie in memory of his father Jiang Cai.
Sweet Grass House Located in the sweet grass garden, it is built in memory of a prior herb (i.e. sweet grass) garden. The name is a reference to Ode to Nanjing which reads, "Among its sweet grasses are climbing fig, orchid, common vetch, and aromatic sunchang. They are thick cordial, vigorus, luxuriant, diffusing, delicate fragrance, and sending forth sweet smell".
Longevity Pavilion Named for a verse by Yuan Ji, "Cultivation of one's mind brings about longevity which enables one to be as admirable as the great nature." It is a five bay hall with two wings, the Chenggu Valley Study and the Missing Jingting Mountain Study. All of the views in the garden are composed to be seen from this structure. The view meant to evoke a feeling of rustic delight. The hall was originally used as a teahouse and painting studio. The Missing Jingting Mountain study referred to the first official post of Jiang Cai, Mount Jingting in Xuanzhou, Anhui.
Moon Gate with inscription
Bathing Gull Pond

== See also ==
- Chinese garden
- Suzhou
