= Sissonne =

- Commune
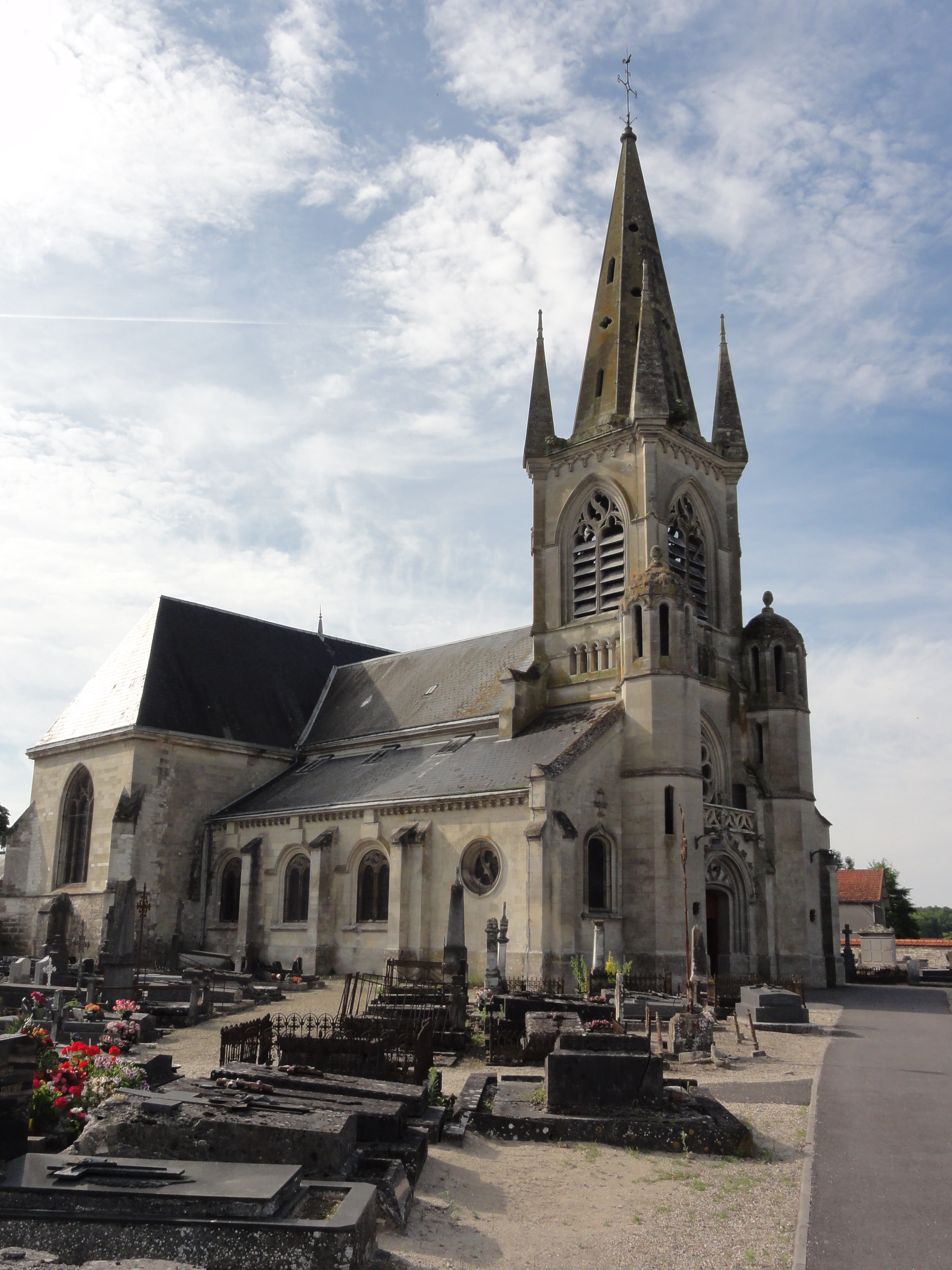
- The church of Sissonne

- Coat of arms
- Location of Sissonne
- Location within France Location within Hauts-de-France
- Coordinates: 49°34′18″N 3°53′37″E
- Country: France
- Region: Hauts-de-France
- Department: Aisne
- Arrondissement: Laon
- Canton: Villeneuve-sur-Aisne
- Intercommunality: Champagne Picarde

Government
  - Mayor (2026–32): Bernard Gandon
- Area^{1}: 53.53 km^{2} (20.67 sq mi)
- Elevation: 108 m (354 ft)
- Highest elevation: 131 m (430 ft)
- Lowest elevation: 71 m (233 ft)
- Population (2023): 2,065
  - Density: 38.58/km^{2} (99.91/sq mi)
- Time zone: UTC+01:00 (CET)
  - Summer (DST): UTC+02:00 (CEST)
- INSEE/Postal code: 02720 /02150
- ^{1} French Land Register data, which excludes lakes, ponds, glaciers > 1 km^{2} (0.386 sq mi or 247 acres) and river estuaries.

Sissonne (French pronunciation: [sisɔn]) is a commune in the Aisne department in Hauts-de-France in northern France. It is about 20 km east of Laon, close to the source of the river Souche.

The community dates back to the 12th century with the first church built c.1107.

The sculptor and engraver Guillaume Dupré was born at Sissonne c.1576.

There has been a military camp at Sissonne since 1895, with British and German military cemeteries from World War I nearby.

The politician Nicolas Fricoteaux was born at Sissonne in 1962.

== Population ==
Historical population

Year	Pop.	±% p.a.
1793	1,040	—
1800	1,094	+0.73%
1806	1,074	−0.31%
1821	1,209	+0.79%
1831	1,315	+0.84%
1836	1,323	+0.12%
1841	1,403	+1.18%
1846	1,372	−0.45%
1851	1,450	+1.11%
1856	1,502	+0.71%
1861	1,509	+0.09%
1866	1,455	−0.73%
1872	1,430	−0.29%
1876	1,551	+2.05%
1881	1,517	−0.44%
1886	1,527	+0.13%
1891	1,482	−0.60%
1896	1,443	−0.53%
1901	1,679	+3.08%

Year	Pop.	±% p.a.
1906	1,737	+0.68%
1911	1,980	+2.65%
1921	2,114	+0.66%
1926	3,161	+8.38%
1931	6,327	+14.89%
1936	8,271	+5.50%
1946	1,742	−14.42%
1954	2,789	+6.06%
1962	2,162	−3.13%
1968	2,405	+1.79%
1975	2,303	−0.62%
1982	2,229	−0.47%
1990	2,315	+0.47%
1999	2,113	−1.01%
2007	2,196	+0.48%
2012	2,070	−1.17%
2017	2,055	−0.15%
2023	2,065	+0.08%

Source: EHESS and INSEE (1968-2023)

== See also ==
- Communes of the Aisne department
