= Perpète Evrard =

Flemish painter

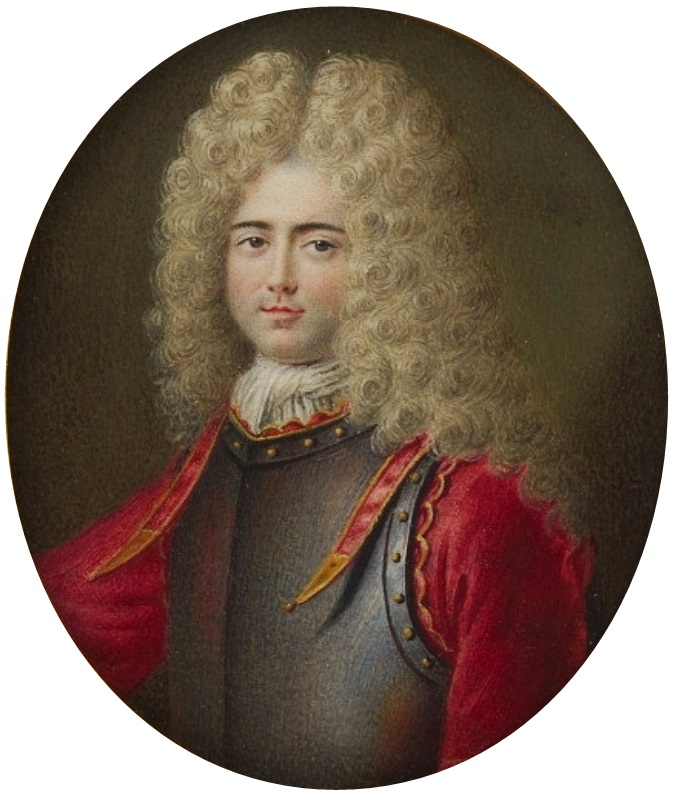
Miniature of a young man in a cuirass by Perpète Evrard, National Museum, Warsaw, 1705

Perpète Evrard (1662–1727) was a Flemish painter of portraits and miniatures, born at Dinant and employed at several foreign courts. He died at the Hague in 1727.
