= Wen Zhenmeng =

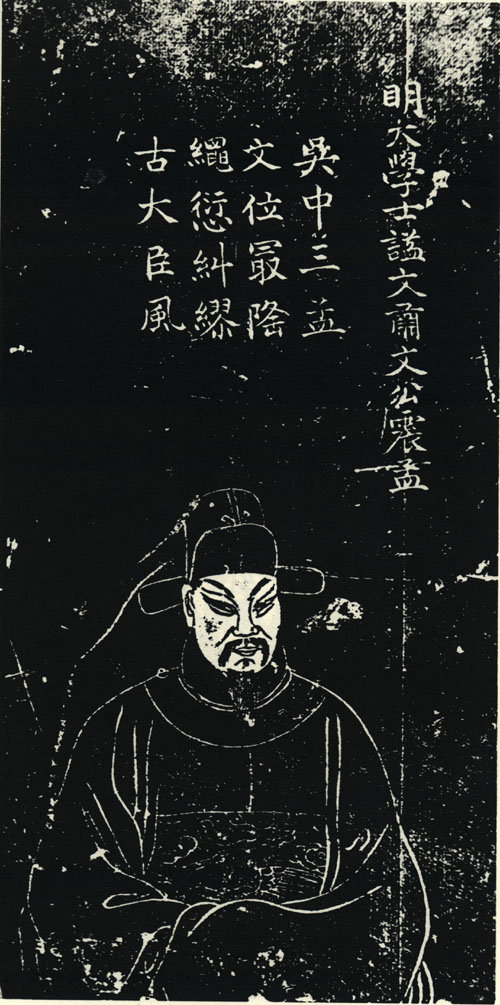
Wen's portrait in Canglang Pavilion of Suzhou

Wen Zhenmeng (Chinese: 文震孟; pinyin: Wén Zhènmèng; Wade–Giles: Wen Chen-meng; 1574–1636) was a late Ming dynasty painter, calligrapher, scholar, author, and Chinese garden designer.

== Biography ==
Zhenmeng was born to a very wealthy family in the city that is today known as Suzhou. He was the great-grandson of the very famous Ming artist, Wen Zhengming (1470–1559), and also the elder brother of Wen Zhenheng (1585–1645), the latter of which was the author of "Treatise on Superfluous Things".

From a very wealthy family, Wen Zhenmeng placed first in the highest level of the civil service exams. This brought him to a national level of importance within the political realm. In 1635, he was given the bureaucratic post of "Grand Secretary", which was notable as a most supreme position.

Wen Zhenmeng loved to garden and his own garden in Suzhou was known as "Garden of Cultivation". Wen's garden was very much celebrated in its day and was especially noted as being quite remarkable for its loveliness. His garden is still preserved to this day in the quiet, northwest district of the city of Suzhou.

Today, Wen Zhenmeng's artworks sell at major international auction houses, including Christie's and Sotheby's.
