= Landscape with a Castle =

Painting by Rembrandt

Landscape with Castle
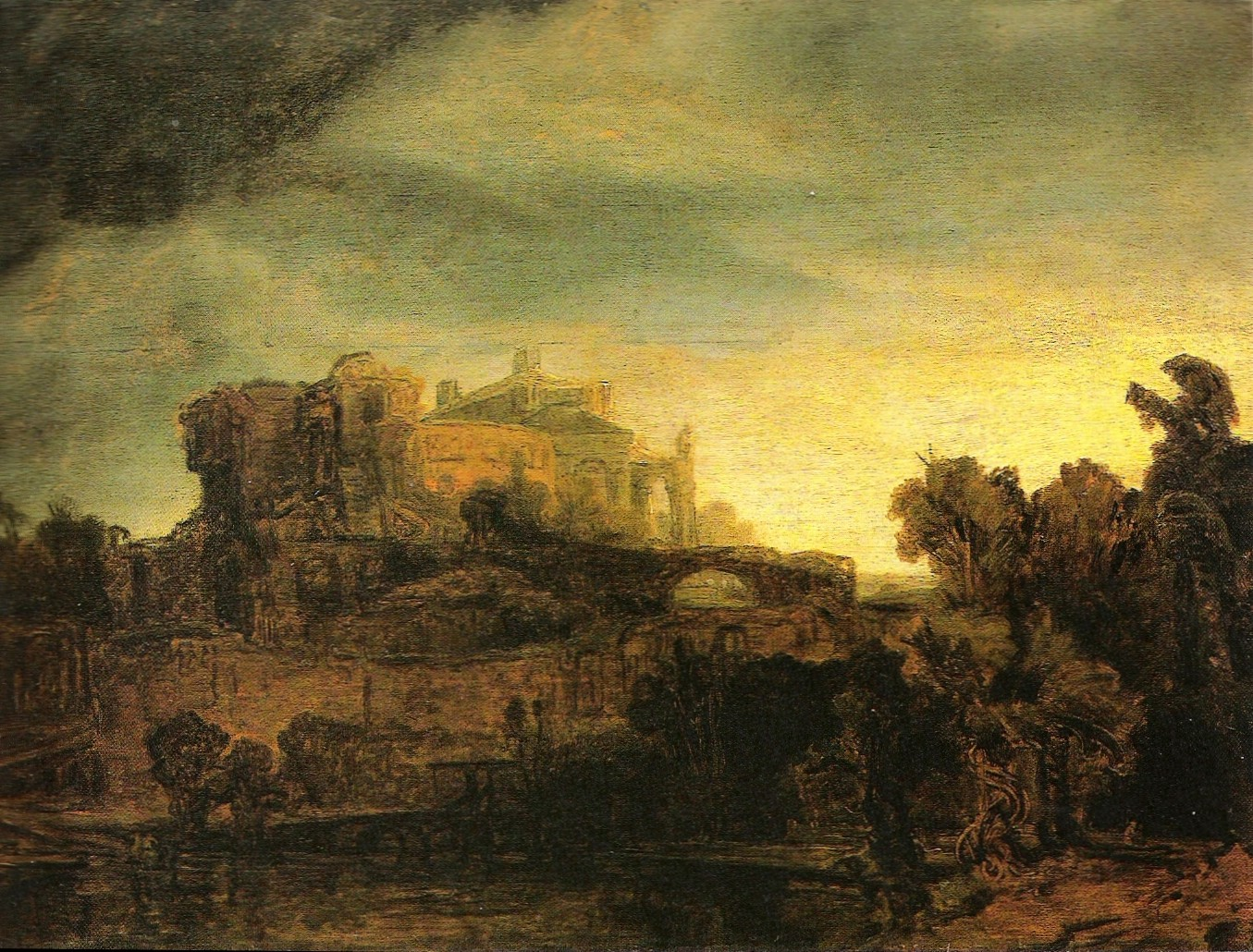
- Artist: Rembrandt
- Year: 1640s
- Medium: oil paint, panel
- Dimensions: 44 cm (17 in) × 60 cm (24 in)
- Location: Room 844
- Owner: French State
- Accession: RF 1948-35, RF 1948 35

Landscape with a Castle is an oil-on-panel painting by Rembrandt, now in the Louvre in Paris. Art historians have variously dated it to 1652 (Rein van Eysinga), 1654 (Frederik Schmidt-Degener), early 1640 (Abraham Bredius and Horst Gerson), 1648 (Kurt Bauch), 1640-1642 (Jacques Foucart), c.1640 (Christian Tümpel) and 1643–1646 (Leonard J. Slatkes).

It is first recorded in the 1692 inventory of Geertruyt Brasser in Delft as "a castle by Rembrandt" (Brasser was the widow of Johan van der Chys). It was later recorded in the collection of Jan Pieter van Suchtelen, a Russian general from the Netherlands. In 1859 van Suchtelen's heirs sold it to Pavel Stroganov in St-Petersburg. On his death in 1911 Stroganov left it and the rest of his art collection to Vladimir and Aleksandra Shcherbatov, the children of his brother's daughter. Vladimir and Aleksandra were murdered by the Bolsheviks in 1920, three years after their artworks had been seized by the state.

By 1925 at the latest the work had been moved to the Hermitage Museum, but in 1932 it was secretly sold off by the USSR, probably via the art dealer Wildenstein & Company. In 1933 it was probably sold to the Parisian collector Étienne Nicolas, in whose collection it definitively appeared in 1935. In 1942 Nicolas sold it and Portrait of Titus van Rijn to Adolf Hitler via the Berlin-based art dealer Karl Haberstock for 60 million francs – Hitler intended it for his Führermuseum in Linz. After the war's end it was returned to Nicolas via the Central Collecting Point and in 1948 he donated it to the Louvre.

== See also ==
- List of paintings by Rembrandt

== Sources ==
- http://cartelfr.louvre.fr/cartelfr/visite?srv=car_not&idNotice=25564
