= Antonino Grano =

Italian painter and engraver

Antonino Grano (1660–1718) was an Italian painter and engraver, principally active in Sicily. Putatively, he was from Palermo.

== Sources ==
- Comune of Palermo, biographical archival entries.
