= Giuseppe Bottani =

Italian painter (1717–1784)

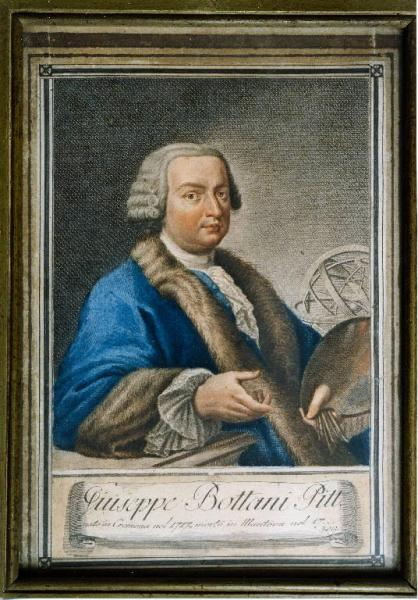
Giuseppe Bottani, Self-portrait, 1740.

Giuseppe Bottani (1717 – 1784) was an Italian painter active in the Baroque period.

== Biography ==
He was born in Cremona, and lived as a boy in Pontremoli. He was sent to study in Florence, where he was a pupil of Vincenzo Meucci and Antonio Puglieschi. He moved to Rome to work under Agostino Masucci, then he returned to Cremona after 1745. In 1769, he was named professor of painting and director of the Academy of Fine Arts in Mantua. He was known for painting landscapes in the style of Gaspard Poussin, and figures in the style of Maratta.

He painted a St. Paola taking leave of her Attendants, once in the church of Santi Cosmo e Damiano at Milan. He painted an Assumption of the Virgin with twelve apostles for the choir of the Pontremoli Cathedral. He painted an Assumption with Saints Francis, Andrea Avellino, Carlo Borromeo, Luigi Gonzaga, and Magdalen for the church of San Francesco in Pontremoli. He painted an Assumption of Christ with twelve apostles for the church of San Giacomo in Altopascio. He painted the Transit of St Francis Xavier for the parish church of San Nicolo in Pontremoli.

He trained his brother Giovanni Bottani, active in Pontremoli circa 1720. Another of his pupils was the Brescian Domenico Vantini. Giuseppe died in Mantua.
