= Giovanni Battista Viola =

Italian painter

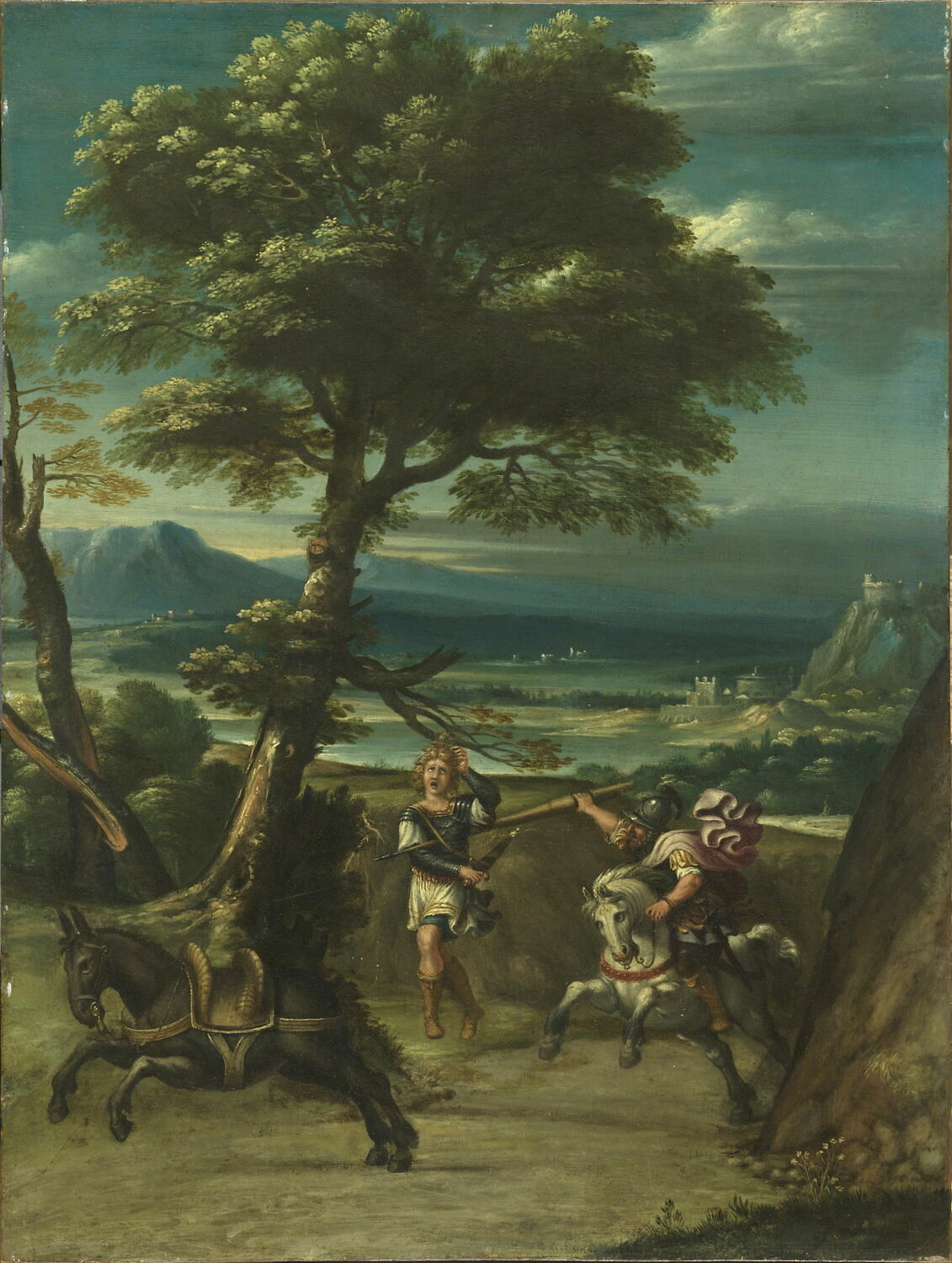
- Landscape with the Death of Absolom, c. 1600; Paris, Louvre
- Born: 16 June 1576; Bologna, Romagna, Papal States (modern Bologna, Emilia-Romagna, Italy)
- Died: 10 August 1622 (aged 46); Rome, Papal States
- Education: Annibale Carracci
- Occupation: Painter
- Known for: Landscape painting
- Movement: Baroque
- Patrons: Vincenzo Giustiniani

Giovanni Battista Viola (June 16, 1576 – August 10, 1622) was an Italian painter of the early Baroque period in Rome. He was the first known Italian to work exclusively as a landscape painter.

== Biography ==
Giovanni was born in Bologna on June 16, 1576. According to Malvasia, he arrived in Rome as a young man with Francesco Albani, who joined Annibale Carracci’s studio there in 1601. He is recorded working with Albani and Domenichino on the frescoed decoration of the Vincenzo Giustiniani's palazzo in Bassano Romano, in 1610, and was living in Albani's house in Rome in 1612. In 1612, Viola married Silvia Gemelli, who was already mother to an Anna Gemelli, who in turn married Albani. Hence, Albani became Viola's stepson-in-law.

In 1617 Viola assisted Domenichino with ten landscape frescoes depicting scenes from the Life of Apollo for the Villa Aldobrandini, Frascati. His fresco Landscape with Travellers (1621–2) in the Camerino dei Paesi in the casino of the Villa Ludovisi, Rome, forms part of a decorative scheme to which Domenichino, Paul Bril and Guercino also contributed. On the basis of these frescoes and of works listed under his name in 17th-century inventories, including the Landscape with the Death of Absolom (c. 1600; Paris, Louvre), Spear attributed a coherent body of works to Viola.

His work is characterized by a predominantly cool colour scheme with dark, blue-green water and dark green and brown trees, bushes and ground. His figure drawing is awkward, and the figures tend to stand in the foreground, with exotically shaped mountains in the distance. Spatial recession is achieved through contrasting bands of light and dark tones. Sometimes the paintings illustrate common biblical or mythological subjects, as in the Landscape with St. John the Baptist Preaching (Cambridge, Fitzwilliam Museum), but more typically they show fishing or hunting scenes.

Giulio Mancini commented in his writings that Viola was well respected for his landscape canvases, which were documented among the works in the collections of Cardinal Pietro Aldobrandini, Giustiniani, Cardinal Mazarin, and the Pamphilj. Louis XIV of France collected at least landscapes, now in the Louvre. He was a teacher of Bartolommeo Lotto and Pietro Paolo Bonzi (il Gobbo dalle Frutta), and would have been influential for Claude Lorrain. The biography of Amorini recounts that Viola died mortified after offending the Cardinal Ludovisi.

== Legacy ==
Although he evidently helped to popularize the Bolognese landscape idiom, which foreshadows the ideal landscapes of Claude Lorrain and Nicolas Poussin, he was quickly forgotten after his death. His paintings have been confused with those of other artists, particularly Domenichino.

== Gallery ==
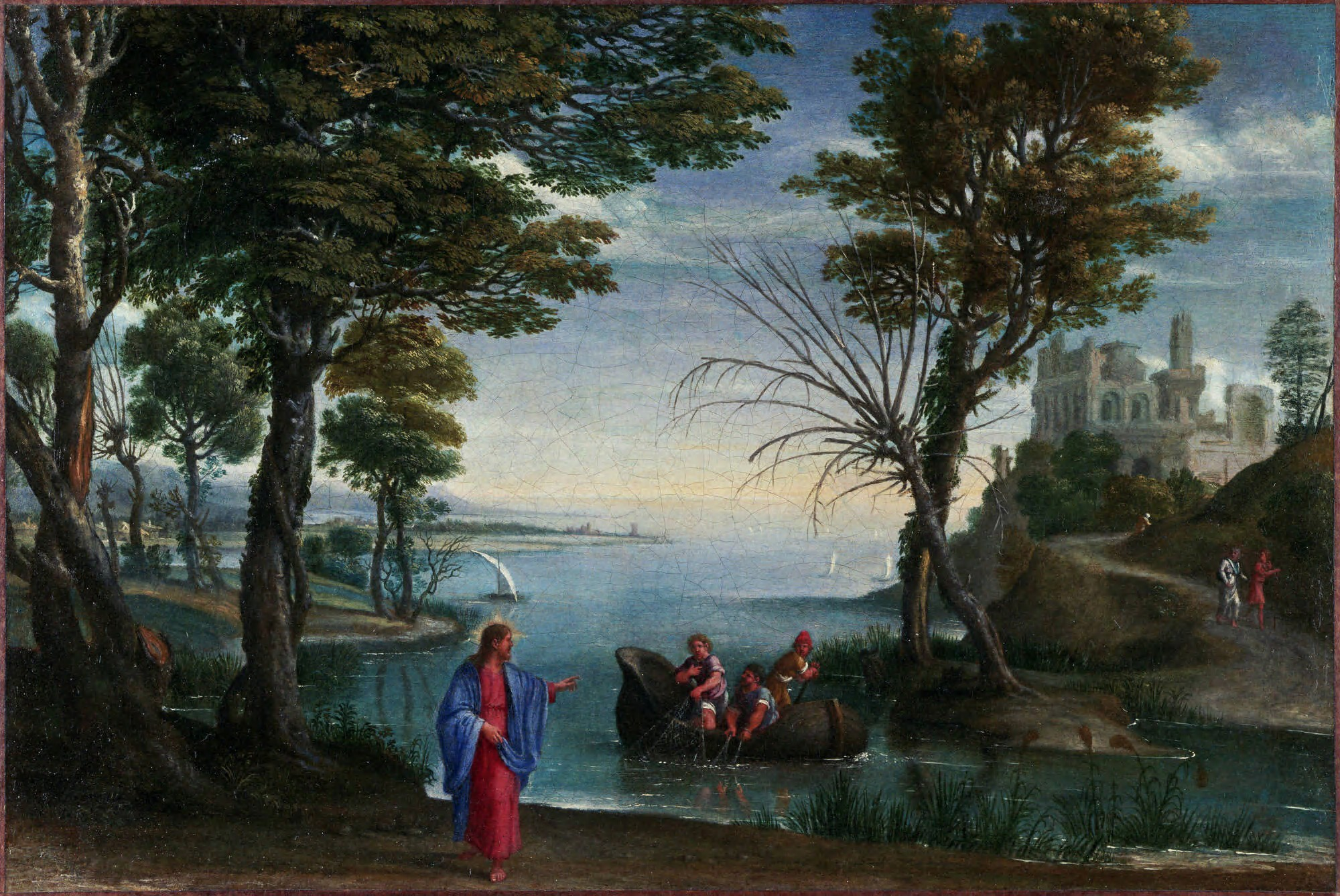
The Calling of Saints Peter and Andrew, Princeton University Art Museum

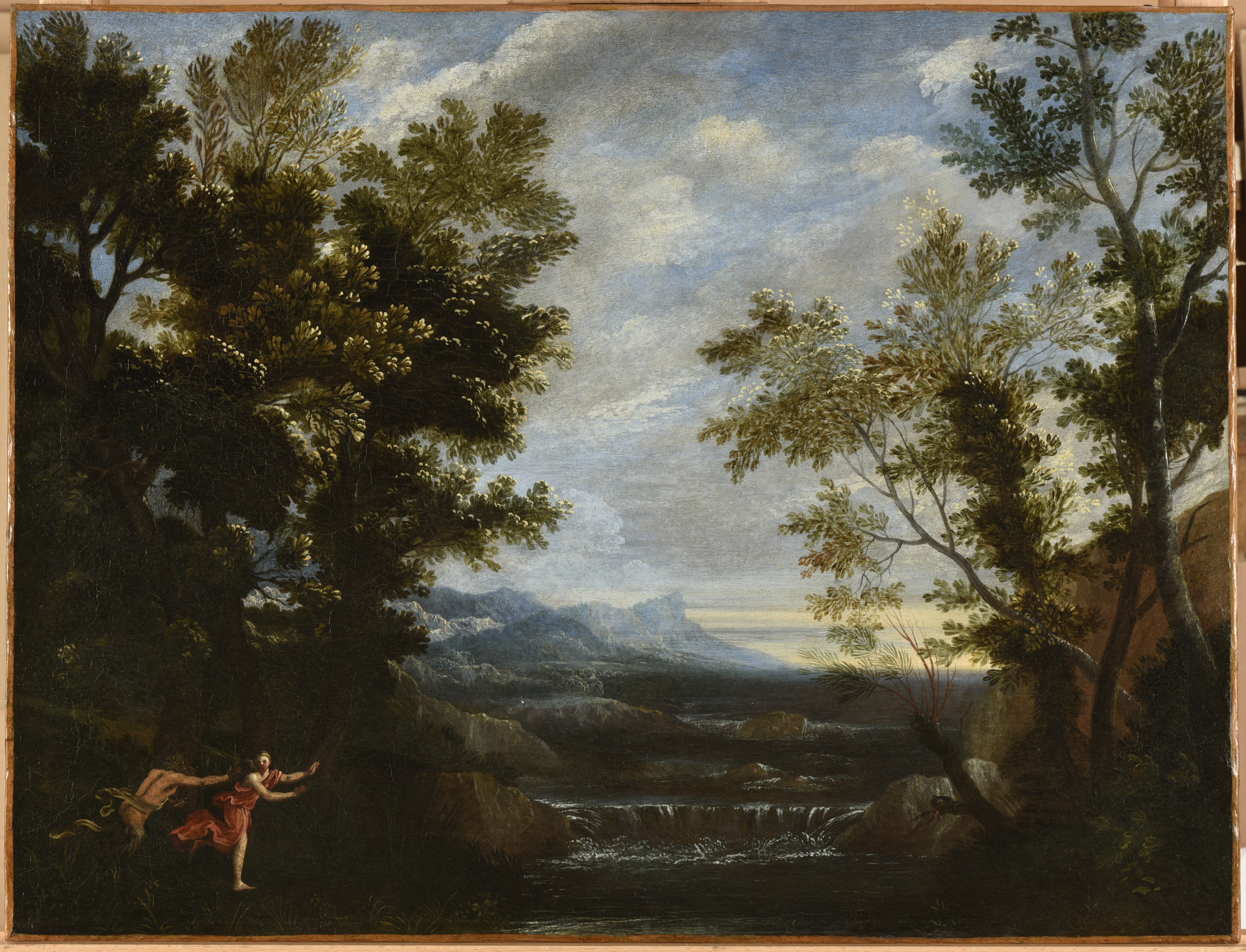
Pan Pursuing Syrinx, Museum of Fine Arts, Reims

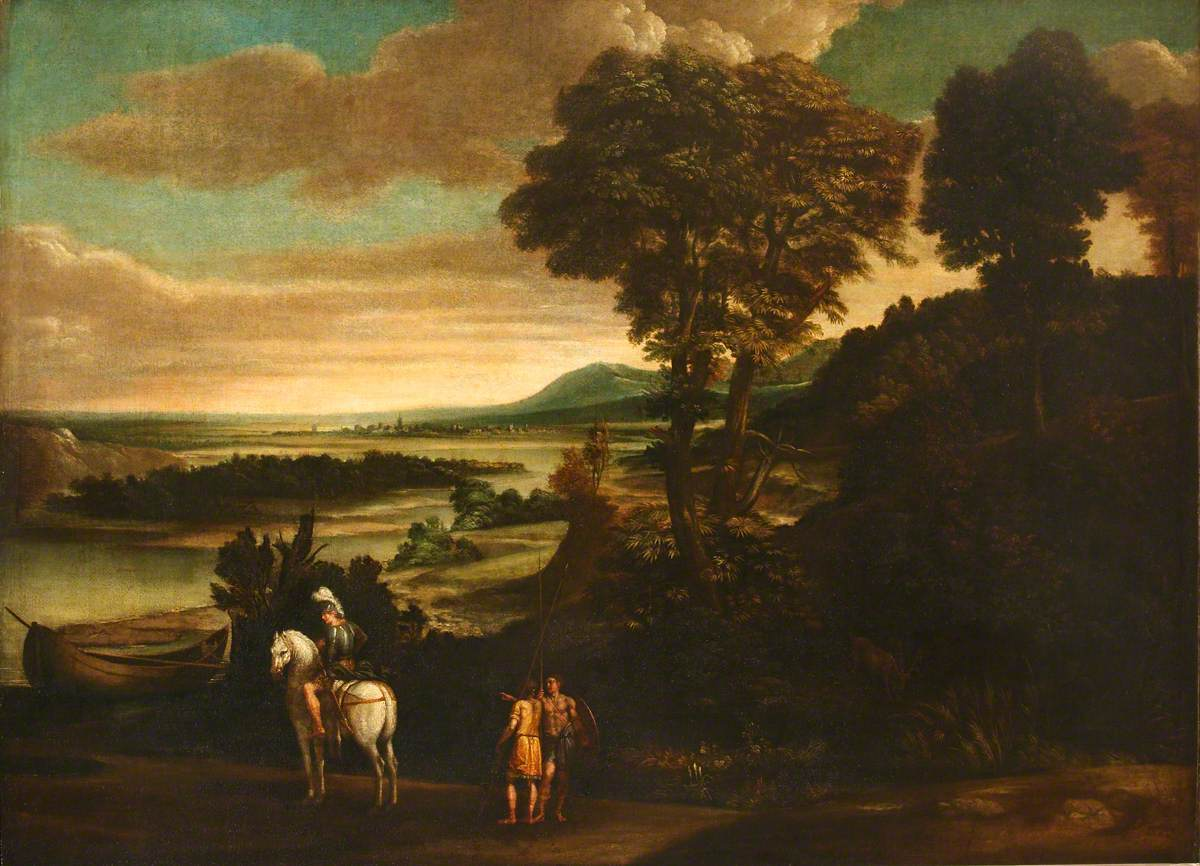
An Episode from Tasso's Jerusalem Delivered, National Trust
