= Alessandro Capra =

Italian architect

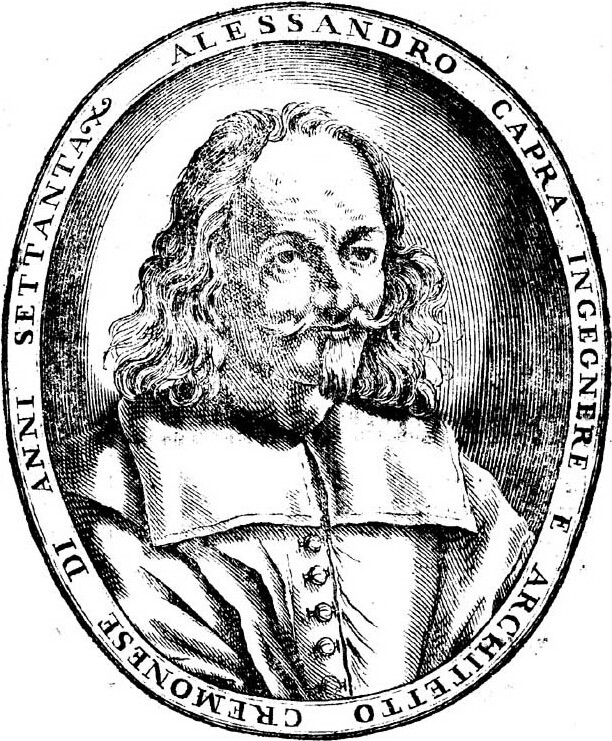
Alessandro Capra

Alessandro Capra (c. 1608 – c. 1684) was an Italian architect and inventor. He was born in Cremona.

He studied architecture under Giacomo Erba. He invented a number of machines. From 1672 to 1682, he published three volumes on geometry and civil and military architecture. His two sons, Giusto and Domenica, worked on a number of hydraulic inventions.

== Works ==
- Nuova architettura dell'agrimensura di terre e acque (in Italian). Cremona: Paolo Puerone. 1672.
- Geometria famigliare (in Italian). Cremona: Giovanni Pietro Zanni. 1673.
- Nuova architettura famigliare (in Italian). Bologna: Giacomo Monti. 1678.
- Nuova architettura militare (in Italian). Bologna: Giacomo Monti. 1683.
