= Joseph Christophe =

French painter

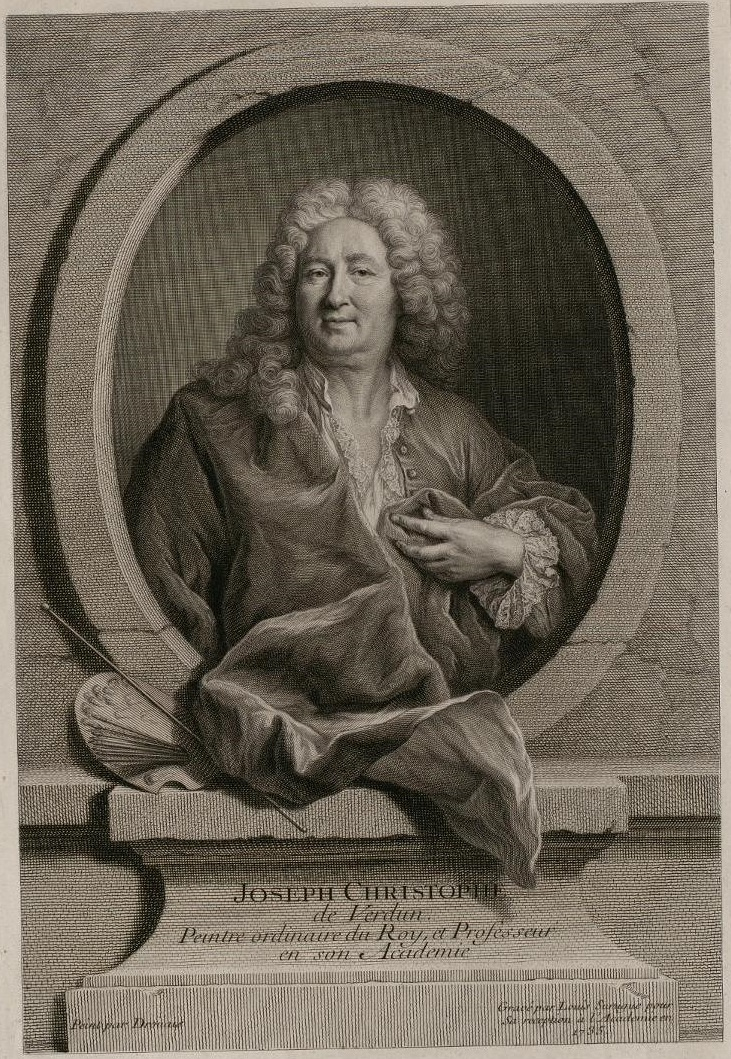
- Born: 1662; Verdun, Three Bishoprics, France
- Died: 1748 (aged 85–86); Paris, France

Joseph Christophe (1662–1748) was a French painter. In 1696 he painted as a "mai" for Notre-Dame the Miracle of the Loaves and Fishes. He was received into the Academy in 1702, and in 1724 became painter to the Archduke Leopold, for whom he executed many portraits. At Versailles there is by him The Baptism of Dauphin, son of Louis XIV. He died in Paris in 1748.
