= Jean André =

French artist

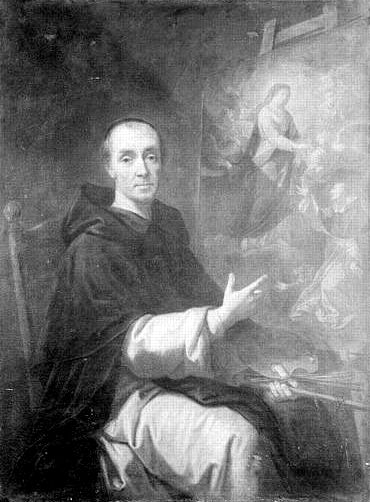
Self-portrait by Jean André, Palace of Versailles

Jean André (or Brother André; 1662–1753) was a French artist.

André was born in Paris, and became a Dominican in 1679. He went to Rome, where he received lessons from Carlo Maratti, and studied the works of Michelangelo and Raphael. He painted portraits and historical subjects, and has the character of being very correct in his designs, and a good colourist. His works include the Feast of the Pharisee, in the Dominican Church at Lyon; a self-portrait, in the Louvre; the Marriage of Cana, and the Miracle of the Loaves, at Bordeaux; and the 'Adoration of the Kings,' and numerous others which he painted in various churches in Paris. Andre imparted instruction in art to Taraval, Chasle, and Dumont.

He died at Paris in 1753.
