= Clemente de Torres =

Spanish painter

Clemente de Torres is the stage name of Clemente de Torvisco y Escobar (23 November 1662 - 1730), was a Spanish Baroque painter of Genoese origin.

De Torres started painting about 1680, and trained with Juan de Valdés Leal, inheriting his style, but the number of works that can be attributed to him is low. A few tables and six apostles painted on the pillars of the Dominican Church of San Pablo in Seville, which corroborates his being a disciple of Juan de Valdés Leal. De Torres visited the Court of Madrid in 1724 and established a friendship with Antonio Palomino, the official painter of the Court, to which he devoted a complimentary poem. He returned to Cádiz, where he continued to paint until his death in 1730.

== Paintings ==
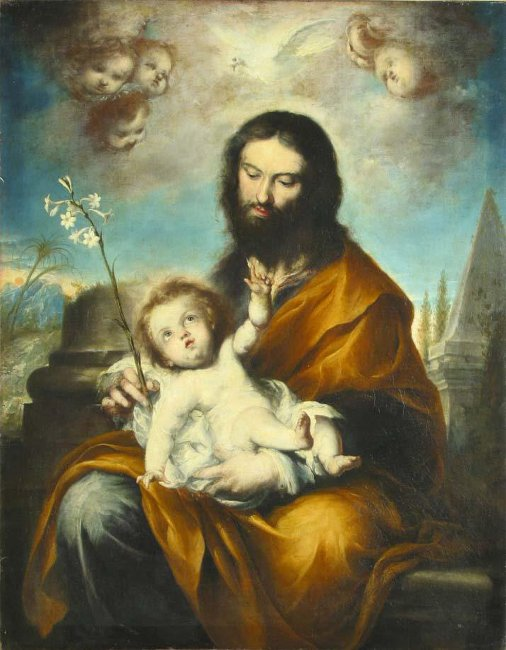
St Joseph with the Infant Christ, 17th century

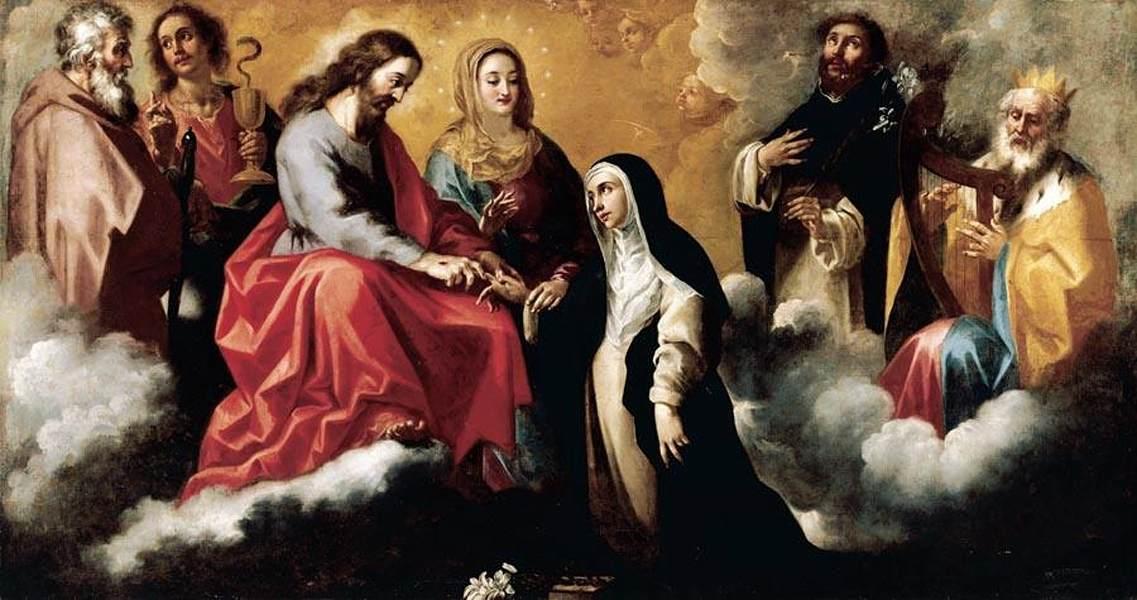
The Mystic Marriage of St Catherine of Siena, first half of 18th century

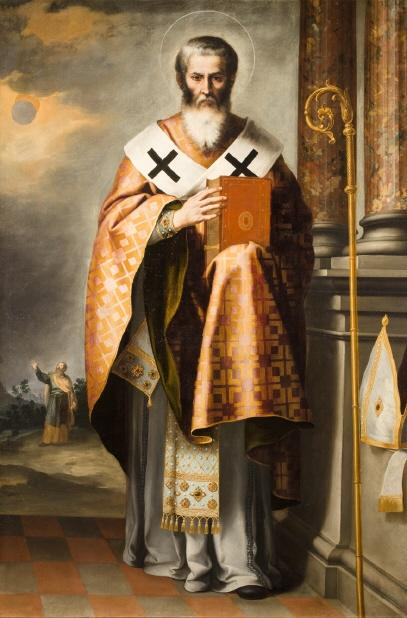
San Dionisio Aeropagita, circa 1720

== External links and references ==
- Cambiaso and Green, Nicholas Mary (1829). Memories for the Biography and Bibliography of the Island of Cadiz. Madrid.
- The content of this article incorporates a Cadizpedia entry published in Castilian licensed under GNU Free Documentation.
