= Guillaume Dupré =

French sculptor and medallist

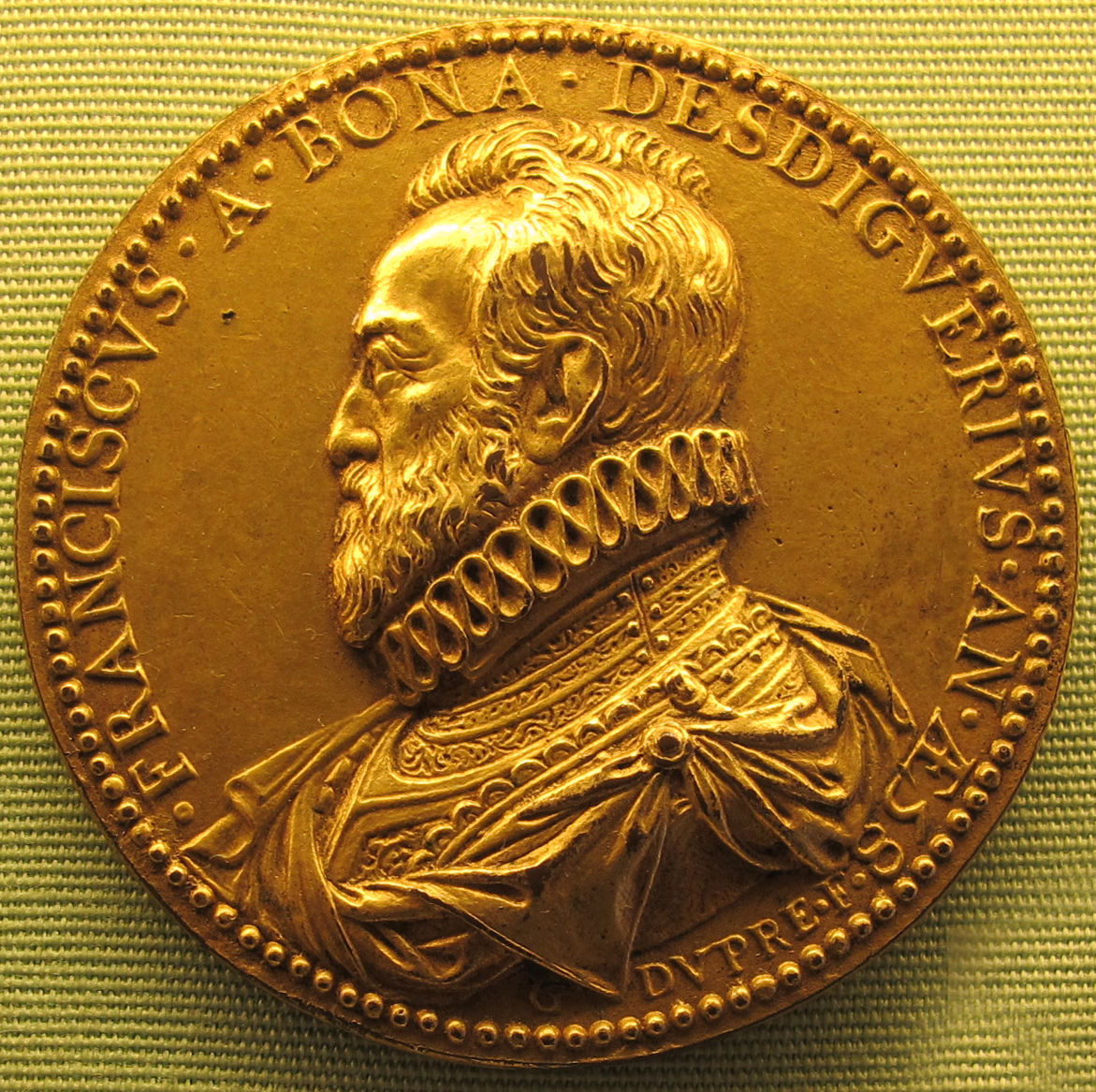
medallion depicting the profile of François de Bonne, Duke of Lesdiguières by Guillaume Dupré, 1600

Guillaume Dupré (1574 or 1576 – 1643) was a French sculptor and medallist.

== Life ==
Dupré was born in Sissonne. He was initially trained by the sculptor Barthélemy Prieur, and in 1600 he married Prieur's daughter. They had a son, Abraham, who also became a medal engraver. Dupré applied his artistic skills into producing medals, in particular for Henry IV of France. In 1603 he was named Sculpteur Ordinaire du Roi, and the following year was promoted to Contrôleur Général des Poinçons et Effigies des Monnaies de France. Dupré's success continued, and in 1611 he was awarded the title Premier Sculpteur du Roi. During his career he engraved medals for Henri IV, Louis XIII, and the beginning of the reign of Louis XIV. He died in Paris in 1643.
