= Philippe Lallemand =

French painter

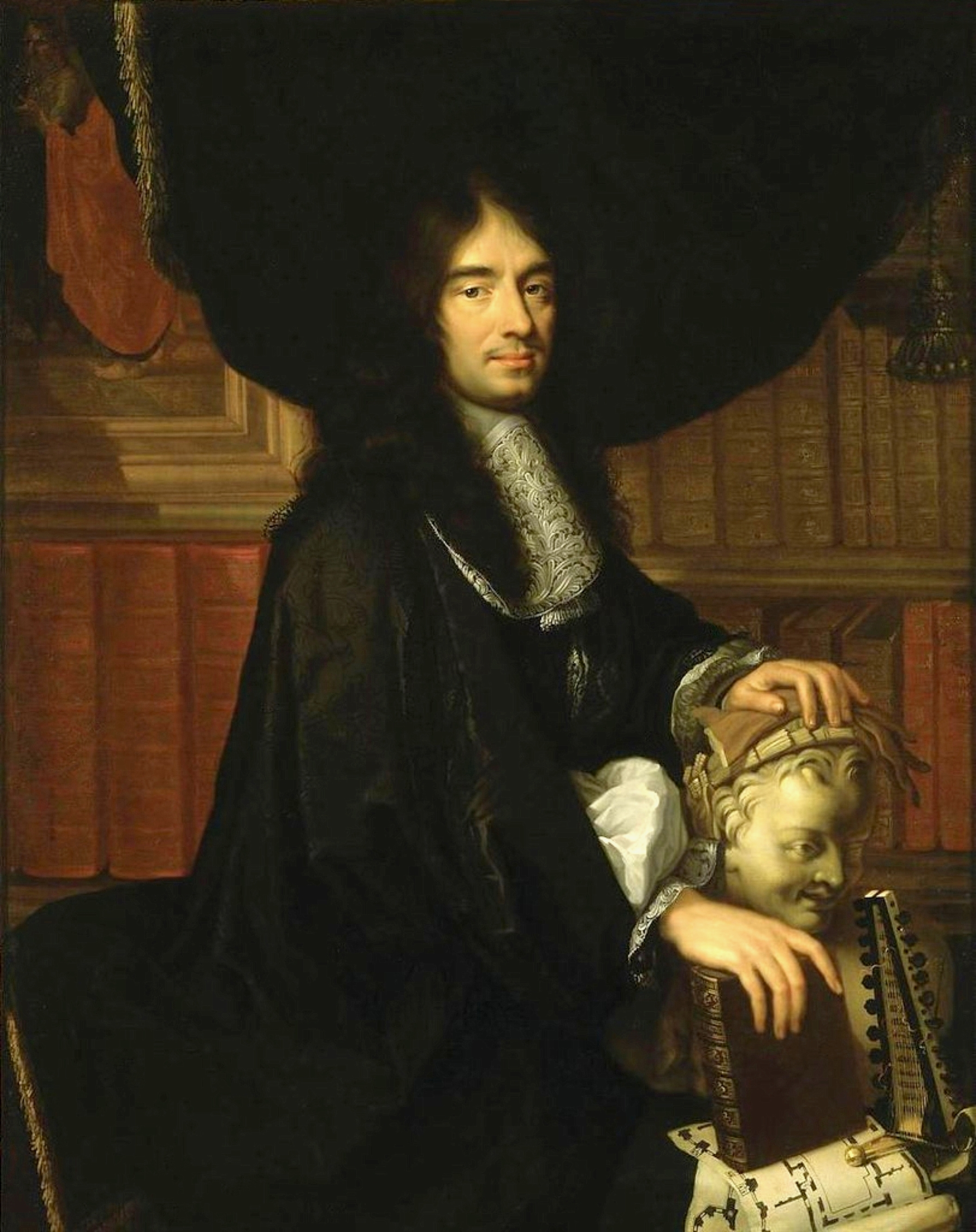
Portrait of Charles Perrault by Philippe Lallemand (1672)

Philippe Lallemand (or Lallemant or Lalemen; 1636 – 22 March 1716) was a French portrait painter of the lesser rank, born at Reims in the province of Champagne. He was influenced by Robert de Nanteuil (1623–1678). The 19th-century confusion with Georges Lallemand of Nancy, a teacher of Nicolas Poussin, Philippe de Champaigne and Laurent de La Hyre, has long been cleared up.

His morceaux de reception for the Académie royale de peinture et de sculpture in 1672 were his portraits of the author Charles Perrault and the financier Gédéon Berbier du Metz, president of the Chambre des Comptes.

Lallemand died in Paris in 1716.

A monograph was Max. Sutaine, Philippe Lallemant, peintre de Reims XVIIe siècle (Paris: Regnier) 1856.
