= Adriaen van Eemont =

Dutch Golden Age painter

Adriaen van Eemont (^{circa}1626 – 10 September 1662) was a Dutch Golden Age painter from Dordrecht who focused on subjects such as landscapes, plants, birds and fruit. He was married Maria Cauw (died before 1667) in Amsterdam on 7 June 1658.

== Biography ==
Van Eemont was born and died in Dordrecht. According to Houbraken he was "as good a bird painter as Melchior d'Hondecoeter. Houbraken had mentioned him twice earlier; as a specialist in painting water birds and plants, and as the teacher of the Dordrecht painter Johannes Offermans.

According to the RKD he is known for fruit still lifes and is possibly the same person as the landscape painter who signed with the monogram "AVE". He worked in Amsterdam, Heusden and France. In France he traveled with Frederik de Moucheron to Paris and Lyon.

There is still some uncertainty about the nature of his work; though Houbraken was so certain that he had specialized in birds and plants, the Dordrechts Museum has a work by him that is more reminiscent of Haarlem works such as those by Adriaen van Ostade.

== Confusion with Nicolaes Ficke ==
His monogram "AVE" has also been interpreted as "NF" for Nicolaes Ficke, a 17th-century painter from Haarlem. The group of monogrammed paintings thus identified are considered to be paintings in the "Haarlem landscape style". An example of such a painting that was formerly attributed to Jan Wijnants is The Halt at the Cottage.

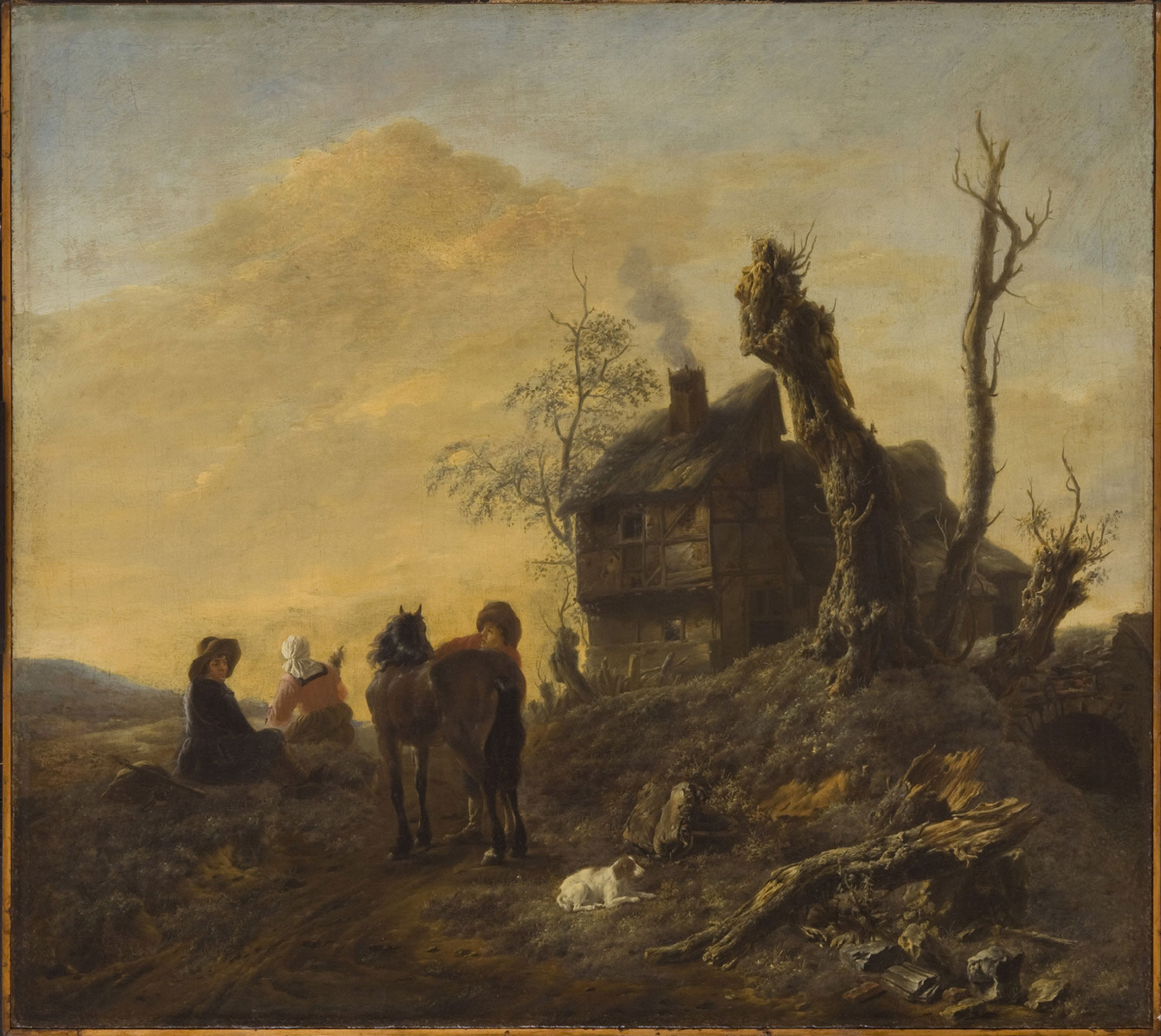
The Halt at the Cottage, Philadelphia Museum of Art
