= Niccolò Roccatagliata =

Italian sculptor

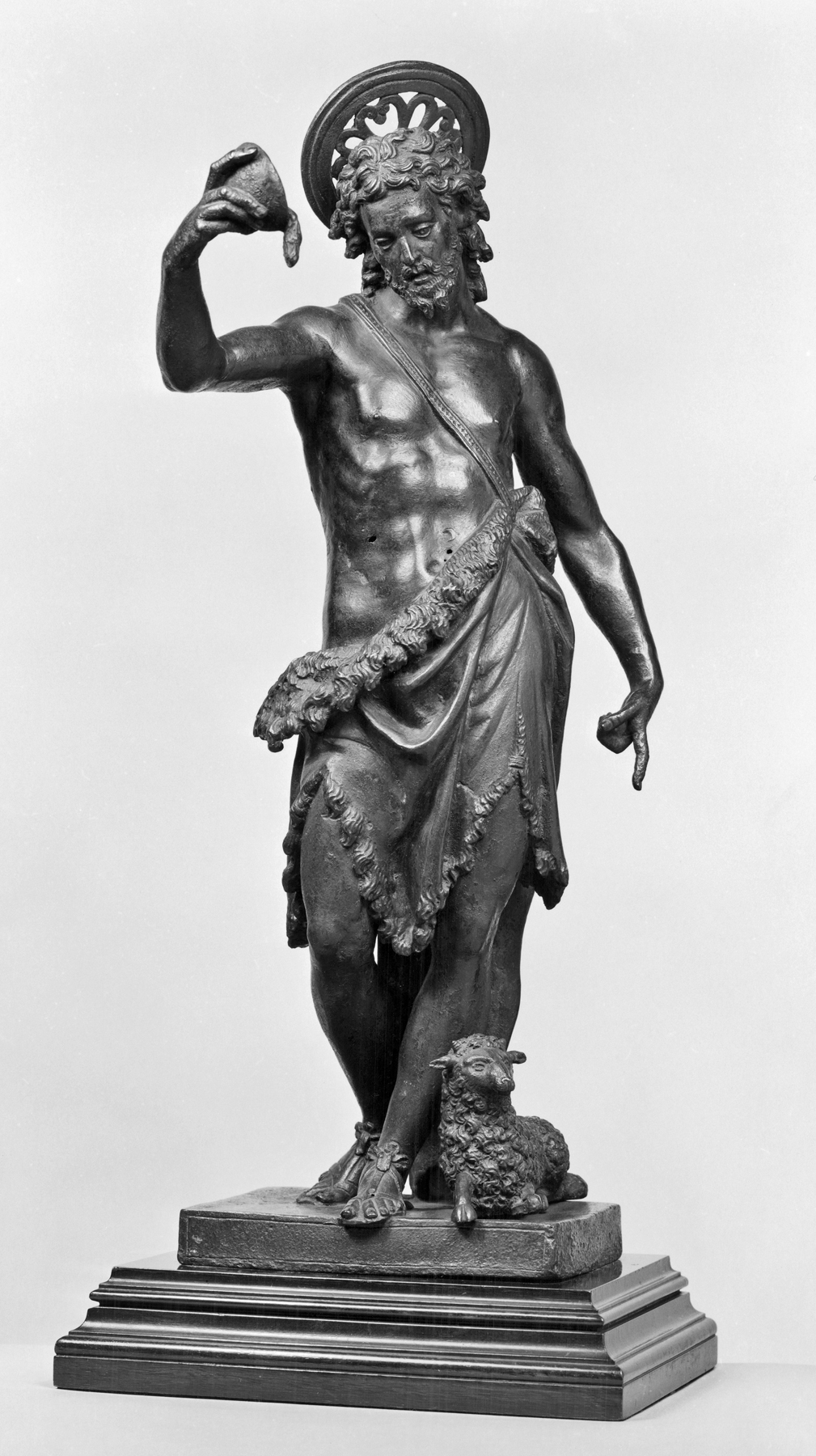
Statue of St John the Baptist, designed by Roccatagliata.

Niccolò or Nicola Roccatagliata (1593–1636) was an Italian sculptor, mainly active in Venice.

Born in Genoa, he is mainly remembered for his work in the church of San Giorgio Maggiore in Venice including bronze statuettes of St George and St Stephen (1590), as well as twenty-eight sconces in the form of putti, and two large candelabra. In 1633, he completed a highly emotive relief depicting an Allegory of the Redemption for the church of San Moisè in Venice.
