= Mina Kolokolnikov =

Russian painter

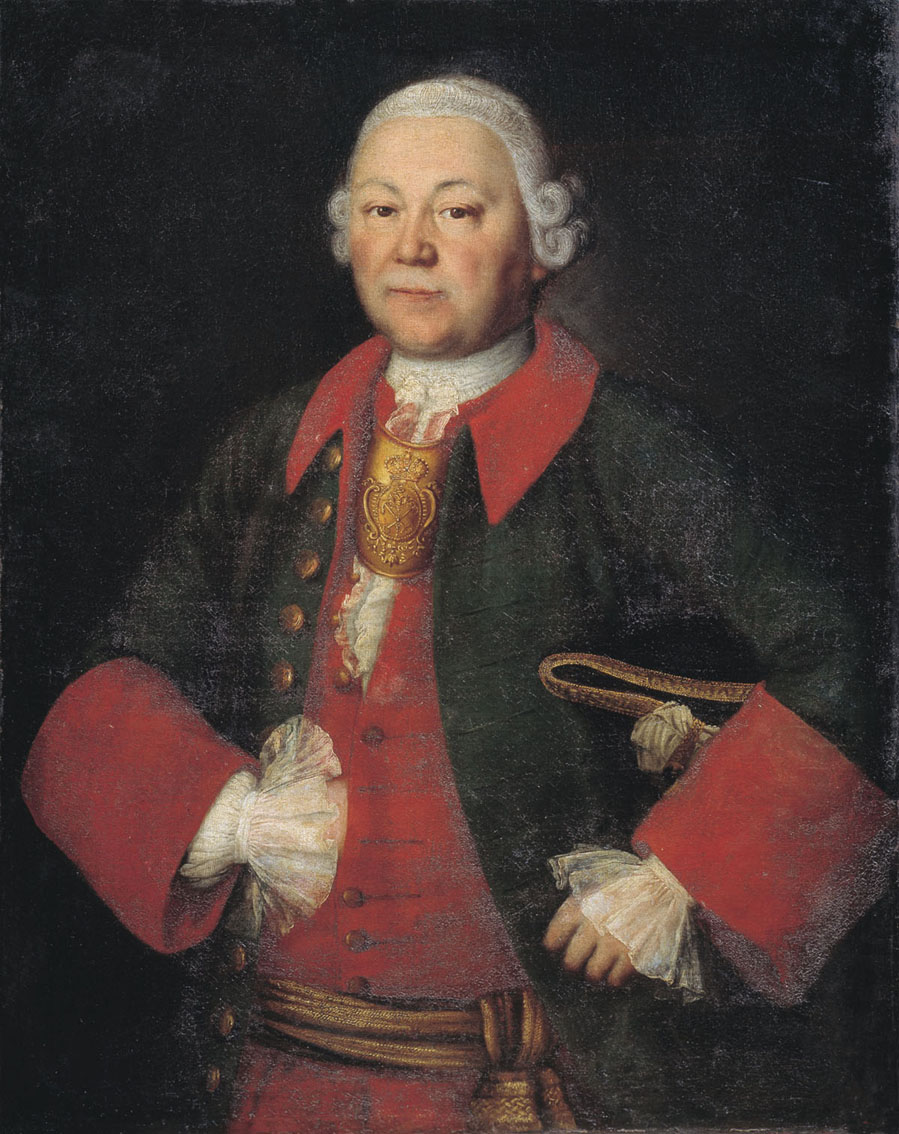
Portrait of Prince I. Meschersky by Mina Kolokolnikov, 1756

Mina Lukich Kolokolnikov (Russian: Мина Лукич Колокольников; 1708?-1775?) was a Russian painter and teacher.

== Biography ==
Kolokolnikov was born in the village of Kravotyn in Tver gubernia. He was a serf of the Pafnutievo-Borovsky Monastery, and learnt the art of portrait painting from Ivan Nikitich Nikitin and Louis Caravaque; he also studied icon painting with Vasily Vasilevsky.

He is known to have assisted in the decoration of the palace at Tsarskoye Selo, and to have lived for a time in St. Petersburg, where one of his pupils was Trifon Anisimov. One of his portraits is in the Tver Regional Picture Gallery. He worked in the studio of Alexei Antropov; consequently, it is often difficult to tell Kolokolnikov's works from Antropov's, as both have very similar technique.

Kolokolnikov's brothers Ivan and Fedot were also painters.
