= Pandolfo Reschi =

Italian painter

- Born: 1643; Gdańsk, Kingdom of Poland
- Died: 1699 (aged 55–56); Florence, Grand Duchy of Tuscany
- Occupation: painter

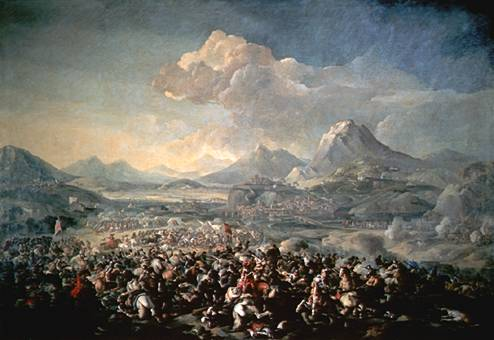
Pandolfo Reschi, Battle of Montjuïc

Pandolfo Reschi (1643–1699) was a painter who was born at Danzig (now Gdańsk) and active in Italy.

He moved to Italy when he was young, and became one of the ablest pupils of Giacomo Borgognone. He painted battle-pieces and imitated the landscapes of Salvator Rosa. He also excelled in painting perspective and architectural views (quadratura).
