= Tommaso Misciroli =

Italian painter

Tommaso Misciroli (1636–1699) was an Italian painter of the Baroque period. Also called il Pittor Villano or the Peasant Painter. Born in Faenza. He studied the work of Guido Reni. In Faenza, he painted a Martyrdom of Saint Cecilia for the church of namesake in Faenza.
