= Michiel Maddersteg =

Dutch painter

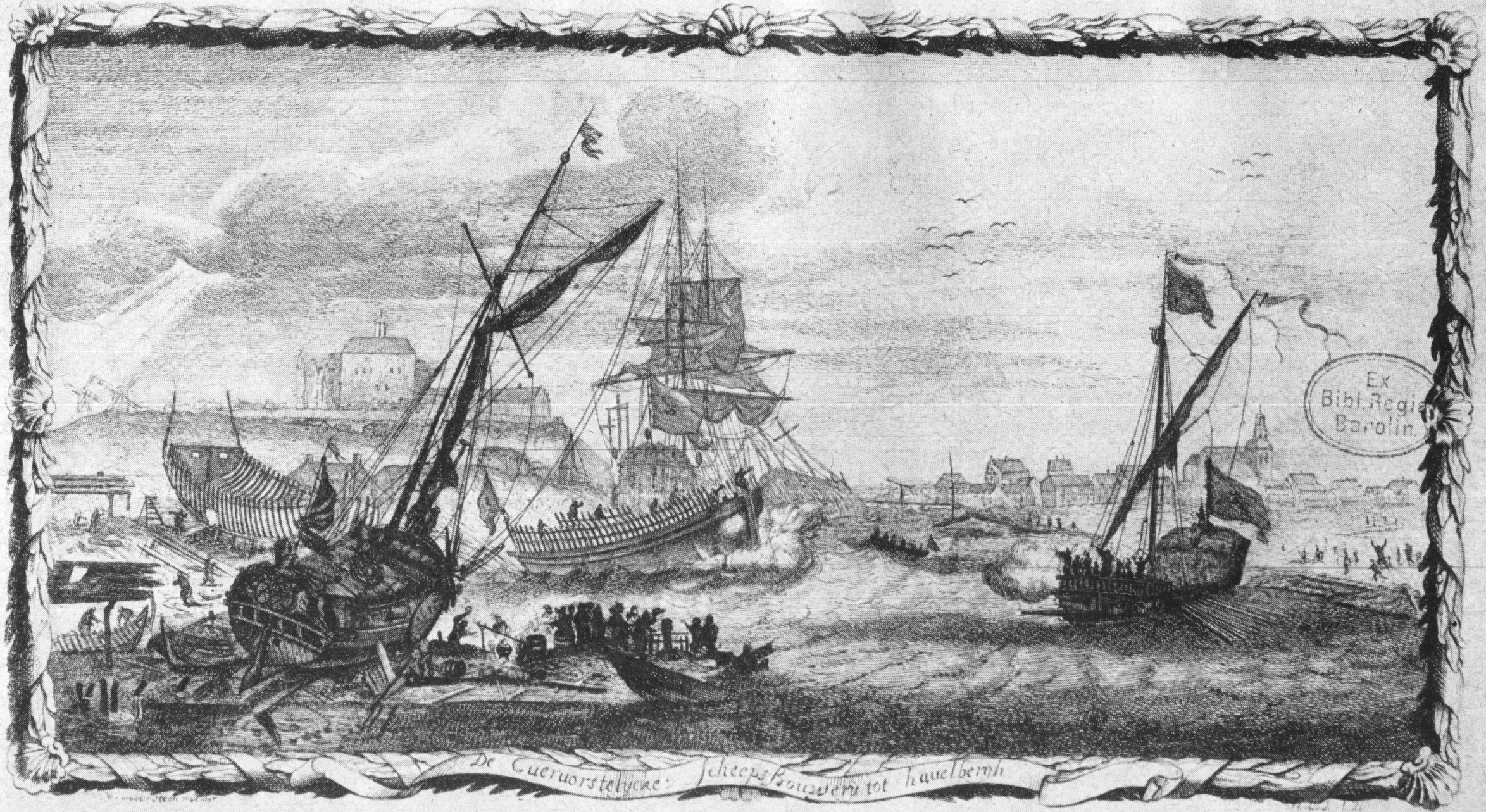
Print by Michiel Maddersteg Shipyard in Havelberg

Michiel Maddersteg (1662–1708) was a Dutch painter.

Maddersteg was born in Enkhuizen and baptized on January 5, 1662. His father was an artist.

He studied under Ludolf Backhuysen. He mainly painted maritime scenes. He spent most of his life at the court of Frederick I of Prussia, but returned to Amsterdam later in life, where he commissioned the building of two beautiful ships for the pleasure of Frederick I. He died in Berlin in 1708. Most of his paintings are in Germany, since he spent so many years at court in Brandenburg.
