= Girolamo Ruggieri =

Italian painter

Girolamo Ruggieri (1662–1717) was an Italian painter of the Baroque period. Painted in Verona, specializing in landscapes and battle paintings.
