= Pietro Paolo Bonzi =

Italian painter

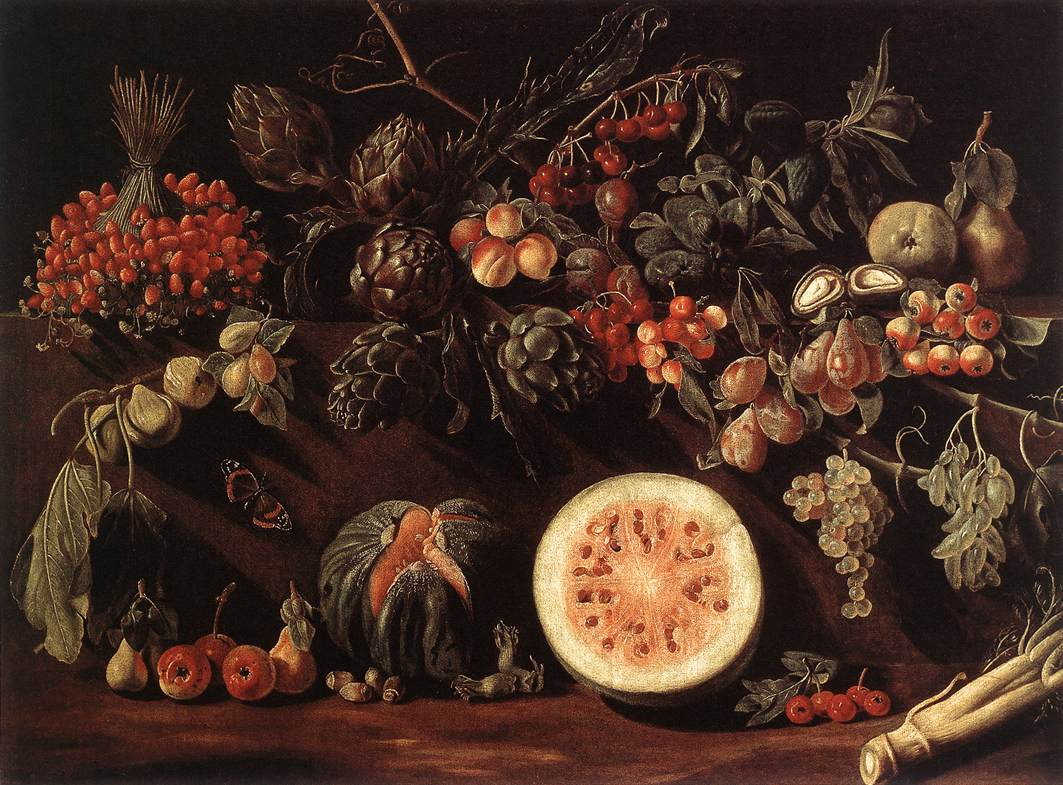
Fruit, Vegetables and a Butterfly, 1620

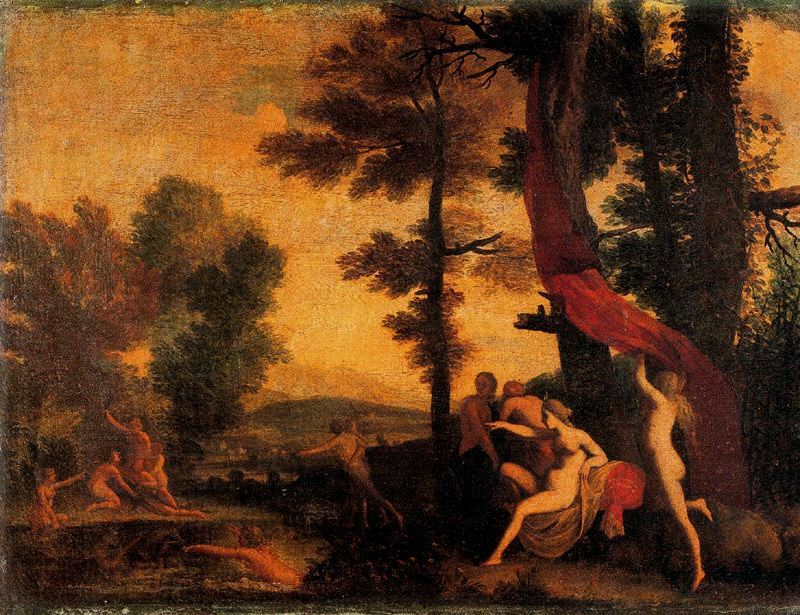
Diana and the Nymph Callisto, Palazzo Pitti, Florence

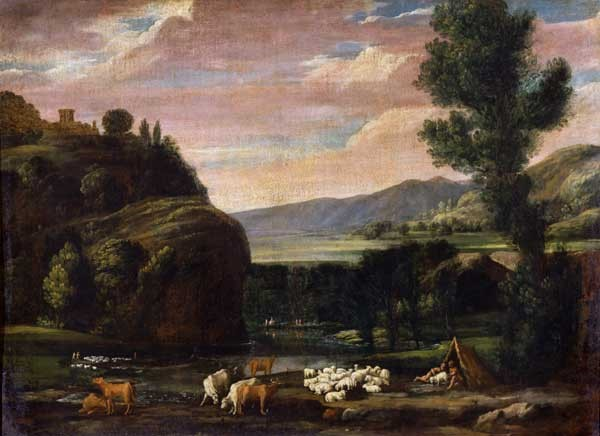
Landscape with Shepherds and Sheep, Museo Capitolino

Pietro Paolo Bonzi (c. 1576–1636), also known as il Gobbo dei Carracci (hunchback of the Carracci) or il Gobbo dei Frutti (of fruits), was an Italian painter, best known for his landscapes and still-lifes. A cartoon of the painter shows his highly deformed lordotic posture.

He was born in Cortona, was part of the circle of Annibale Carracci and Domenichino, and trained under Giovanni Battista Viola in Rome. In Rome, he worked for Cardinal Pier Paolo Crescenzi. There are only two still-life paintings known with his signature; he thus was one of the first Italian artists in Rome working in this style. The Giustiniani inventories of 1638 cite paintings by Bonzi, and other still-lifes are documented in the 1670 inventory of Principe Lorenzo Onofrio Colonna's collection. He also worked in fresco and in 1622-23 worked with Pietro da Cortona on the ceiling of a gallery in the Palazzo Mattei di Giove. Other commissions cited by Baglione include his work in the Palazzo Pallavicini-Rospigliosi.

== Works ==
- Fruits, Vegetables and a Butterfly (1620), private collection
- Italianate River Landscape, private collection
- Landscape with Shepherds and Sheep, Pinacoteca Capitolina, Rome
- At the Louvre, Paris:
  - Landscape with a Dog
  - Diana and the Nymph Callisto, Palazzo Pitti, Florence
