= Giovanni Battista Buonocore =

Italian painter (1643–1699)

Portrait of Giovanni Battista Bonocore by Antonio Giovanni Crecolini

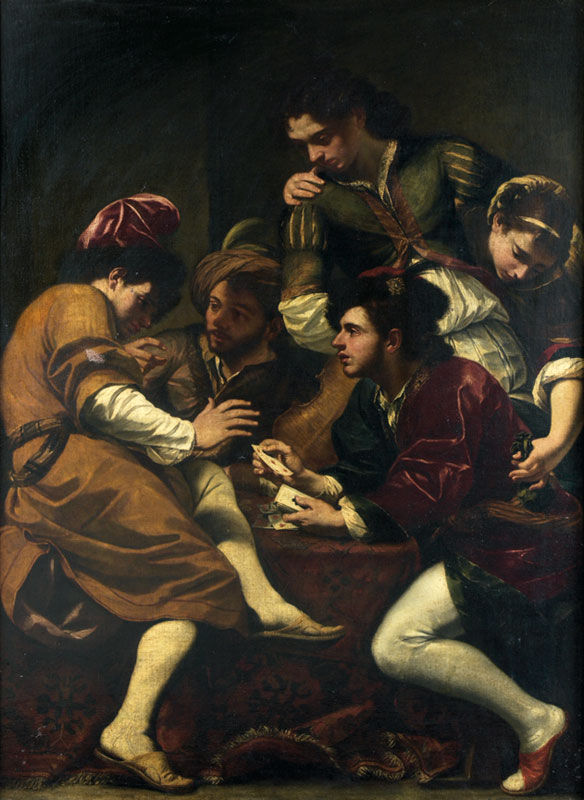

Giovanni Battista Buonocore (1643 in Campli, Province of Teramo, Abruzzo – 22 May 1699 in Rome) was an Italian painter of the Baroque period. He became Rector (1679), then Principe (1698) (replacing the Maratta) of the Accademia di San Luca of Rome.

== Biography ==
While born in Abruzzo, he first trained with Mola in Lombardy, then travelled to Parma, Venice, Ferrara, Cento, Florence, and Bologna, before settling in Rome. He painted an altar-piece for the Chiesa degli Orfanelli at Rome. He is known there for a canvas of Martyrdom of San Gaetano which was once in the Villa Medici. He also painted a San Andrea Avellino, Massacre of the Innocents, St Anthony of Padua with Virgin and Child, and a Deposition. He painted a Crucifixion for the Church of Santa Maria in Aracoeli. He also painted some frescoes in the tribune of the church of San Carlo al Corso. He painted the main altarpiece for the church of the Orfanelli. He painted a series of canvases depicting the victories of Hannibal at Ticino, Trebbia, Trasimeno, and Canae, and also the Defeat of Hasdrubal at the battle of Metauro. Among his pupils was Girolamo de Rossi. His biography was written by Leone Pascoli.
