= 1700 in art =

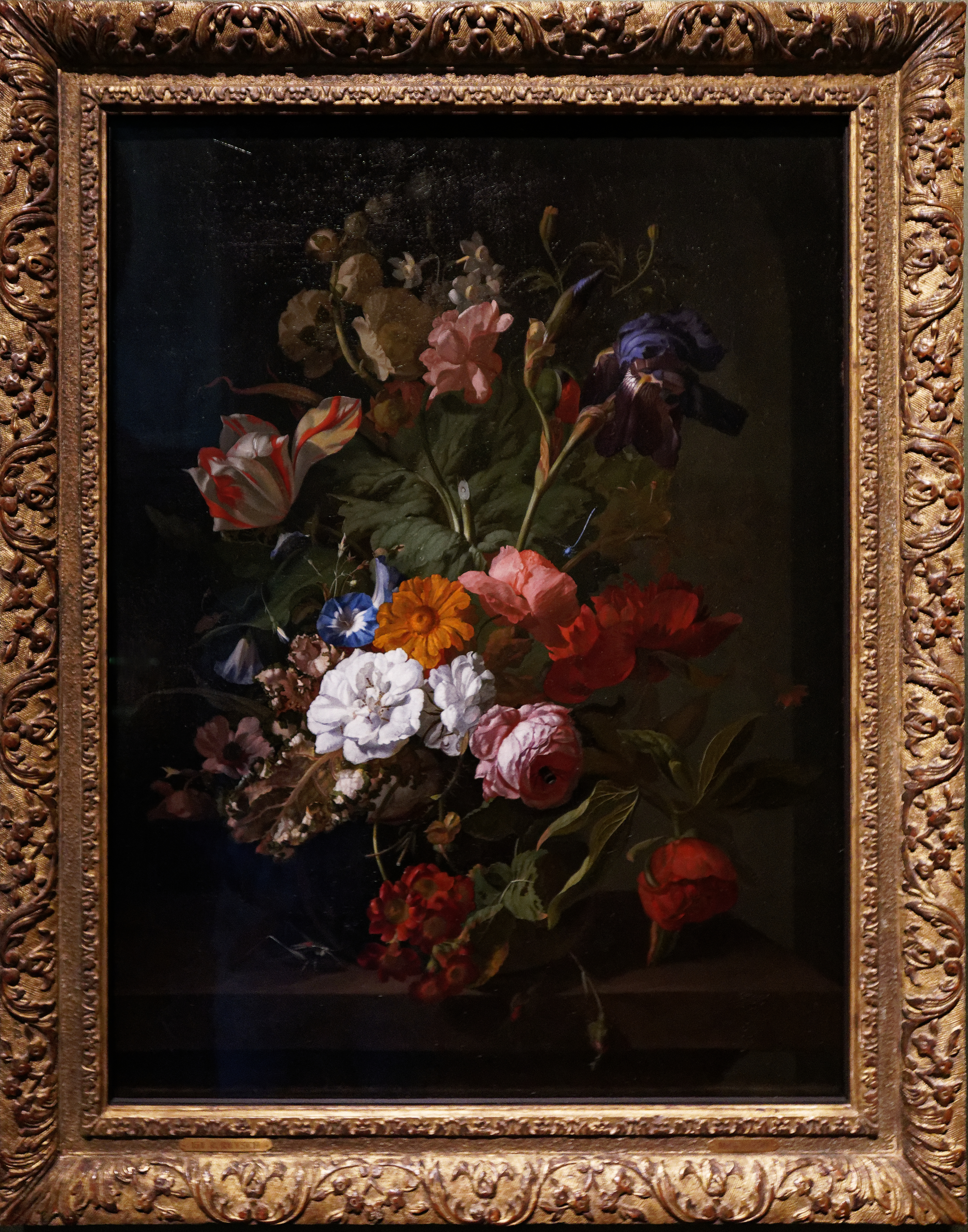
Vase with Flowers by acclaimed Dutch painter Rachel Ruysch, 1700. Currently on display at the Mauritshuis in The Hague.

Events from the year 1700 in art.

== Events ==
- unknown date – Karl Kulik is selected as senior of the guild of artists of Prague.

== Works ==
- Pierre Gobert
  - Portrait of Abbé Fleury
  - Portrait of Françoise-Marie de Bourbon, Duchess of Chartres
- Sir Godfrey Kneller – Portrait of Lady Mary Berkeley, wife of Thomas Chambers
- Sebastiano Ricci
  - Frescoes and Saint Gregory the Great intercedes with the Madonna in chapel of Santissimo Sacramento in church of Abbey of Santa Giustina, Padua
  - Venus and Cupid (approximate date: 1549

== Births ==
- January 1 – Antonio Galli Bibiena, Italian architect/painter, also at Vienna Hofburg (died 1774)
- January 8 – Augustyn Mirys, Polish painter (died 1790)
- March 3 – Charles-Joseph Natoire, French painter (died 1777)
- May 12 – Luigi Vanvitelli, Italian-born architect (died 1773)
- July 1 – Mattheus Verheyden, Dutch painter (died 1776)
- August 6 – Francesco Caccianiga, Italian painter and engraver (died 1781)
- August 18 – Lars Pinnerud, Norwegian farmer and woodcarver (died 1762)
- September 25 – Gaetano Zompini, Italian printmaker and engraver (died 1778)
- October 10 – Lambert-Sigisbert Adam, French sculptor (died 1759)
- date unknown
  - Bernard Baron, French engraver (died 1766)
  - Tommaso Costanzi, Italian gem engraver of the late-Baroque period (died 1747)
  - Michel-François Dandré-Bardon, French historical painter and etcher (died 1785)
  - Antonio Joli, Italian painter of veduta (died 1777)
  - Krzysztof Perwanger, Polish sculptor and mayor (died 1785)
  - Felice Polanzani, Italian engraver (died 1771)
  - Antonio Rossi, Italian painter (died 1773)
  - Jacopo Zoboli, Italian etcher and painter of altarpieces and portraits (died 1765)
  - Gaetano Zompini, Italian printmaker and engraver (died 1778)
- probable – Giuseppe Peroni, Italian painter of frescoes (died 1776)

== Deaths ==
- March 4 – Lorenzo Pasinelli, Italian painter in a Mannerist style of genre-like allegories (born 1629)
- May 30 – Antoine Masson, French line engraver (born 1636)
- July 2 – Lambert Doomer, Dutch painter (born 1624)
- September 15 – André Le Nôtre, French landscape architect (born 1613)
- October 29 – Giovanni Giacomo Borni, Italian painter, active in Lombardy (born 1635)
- November 7 – Pietro Santi Bartoli, painter and engraver (born 1635)
- date unknown
  - Francisco Antolínez, Spanish historical and landscape painter (born 1644)
  - Pietro Bellotti, Italian painter (born 1625)
  - Agostino Bonisoli, Italian painter, active mainly in Cremona (born 1633)
  - Caius Gabriel Cibber, Danish sculptor active in England (born 1630)
  - Ricardo do Pilar, Brazilian monk and painter (born 1635)
  - Matteo Ghidoni, Italian painter of burlesque genre paintings (date of birth unknown)
  - Agostino Lamma, Italian painter specializing in battle paintings (born 1636)
  - Pedro Nuñez de Villavicencio, Spanish painter (born 1635)
  - Johannes Skraastad, Norwegian woodcarver (born 1648)
  - Hans van Steenwinckel the Youngest, Danish sculptor and architect (born 1639)
  - Jacobus Storck, Dutch Golden Age painter (born 1641)
  - Giovanni Maria Viani, Italian painter and etcher (born 1636)
  - Muhammad Zaman, Safavid calligrapher and painter (born unknown)
- probable
  - Edmund Ashfield, English portrait painter and miniaturist (born unknown)
  - Giulio Giacinto Avellino, Italian painter (born 1645)
  - Bernardo Polo, Spanish painter depicting still-life paintings of fruit and flowers (born unknown)
