= 1635 in art =

Events from the year 1635 in art.

== Events ==
- Nicolas Poussin begins work on The Triumph of Pan and The Triumph of Bacchus to decorate Cardinal Richelieu's château.
- Joyous Entries of Cardinal-Infante Ferdinand of Austria into Antwerp and Ghent.

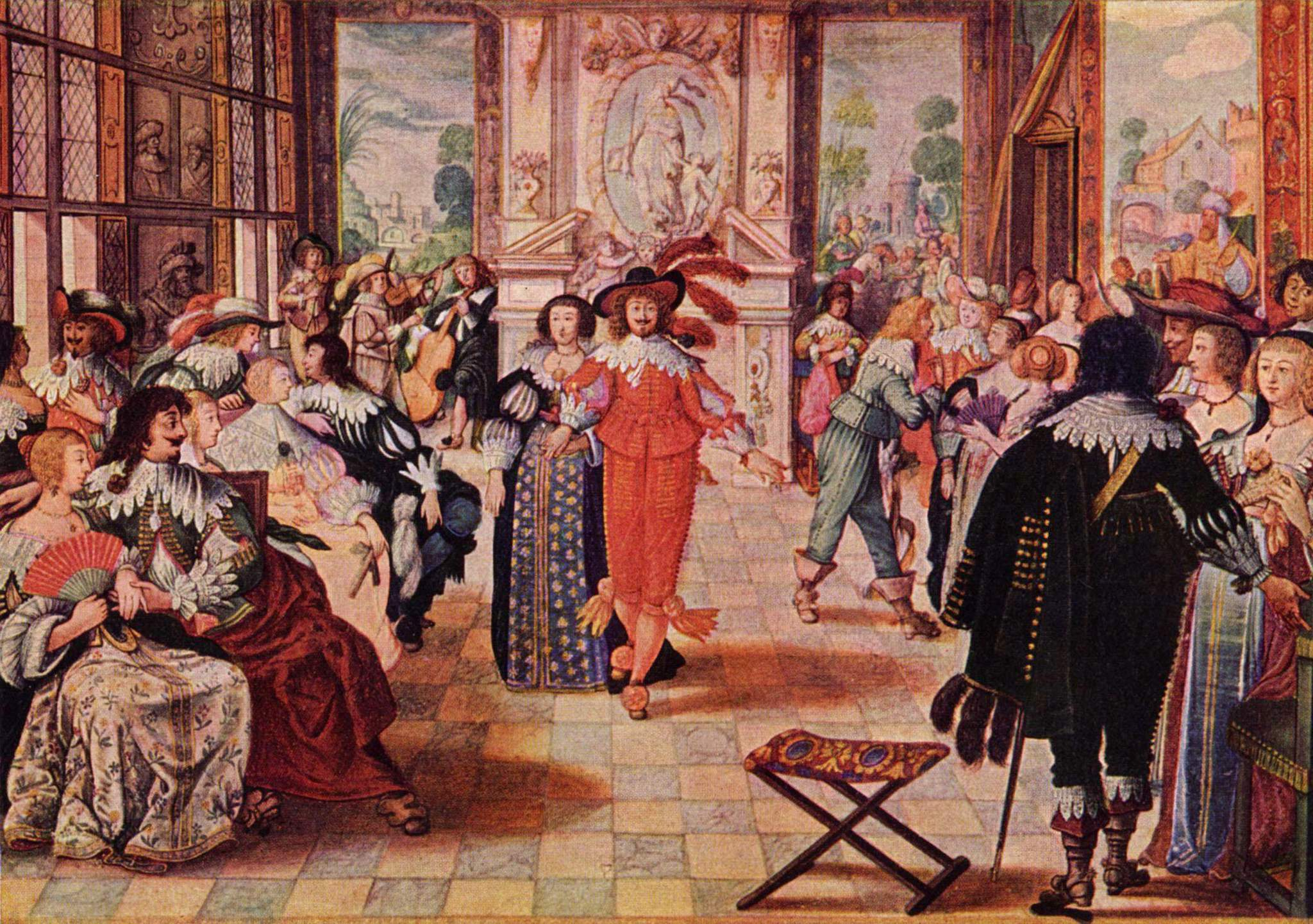
Abraham Bosse – Der Ball

== Works ==
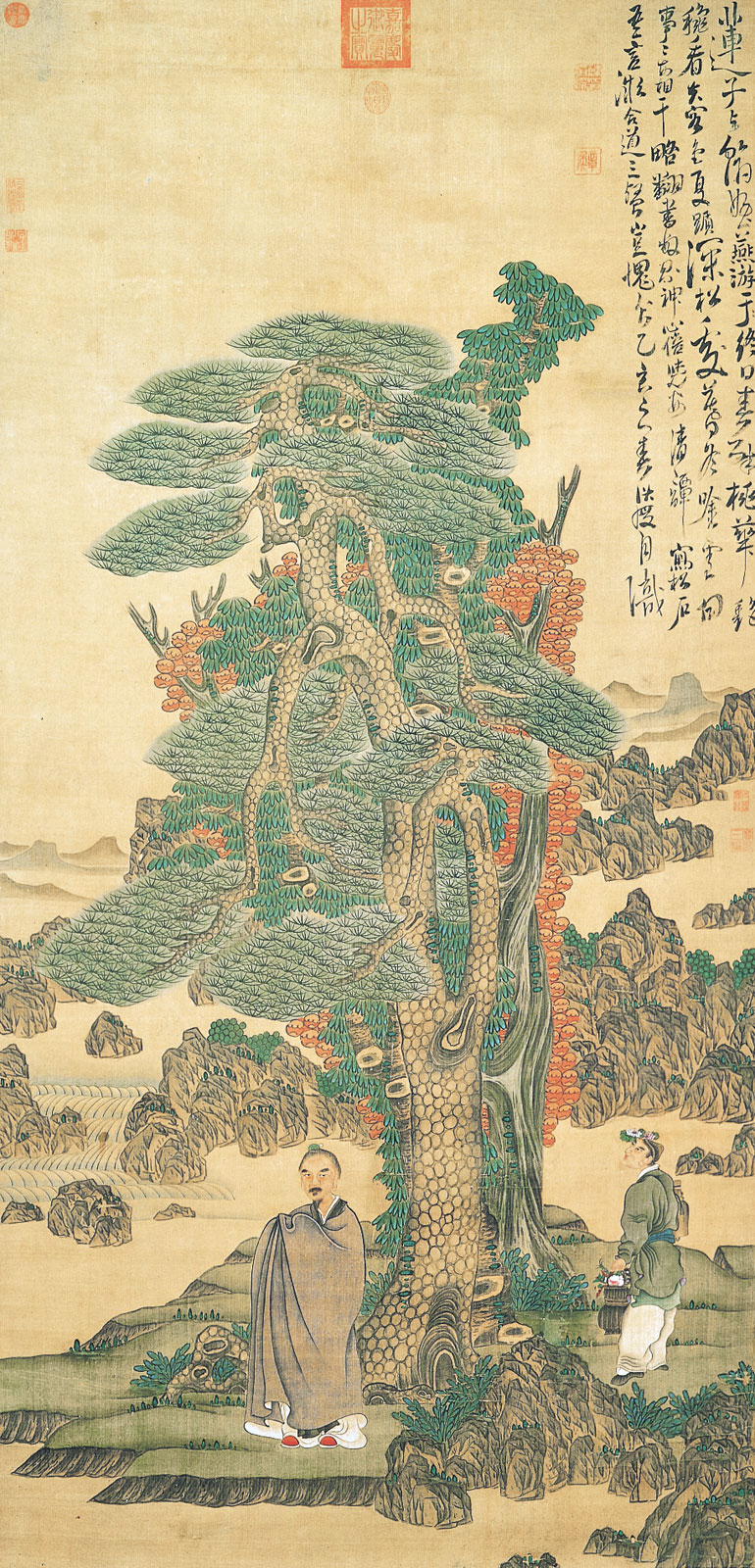
Chen Hongshou – Self-portrait

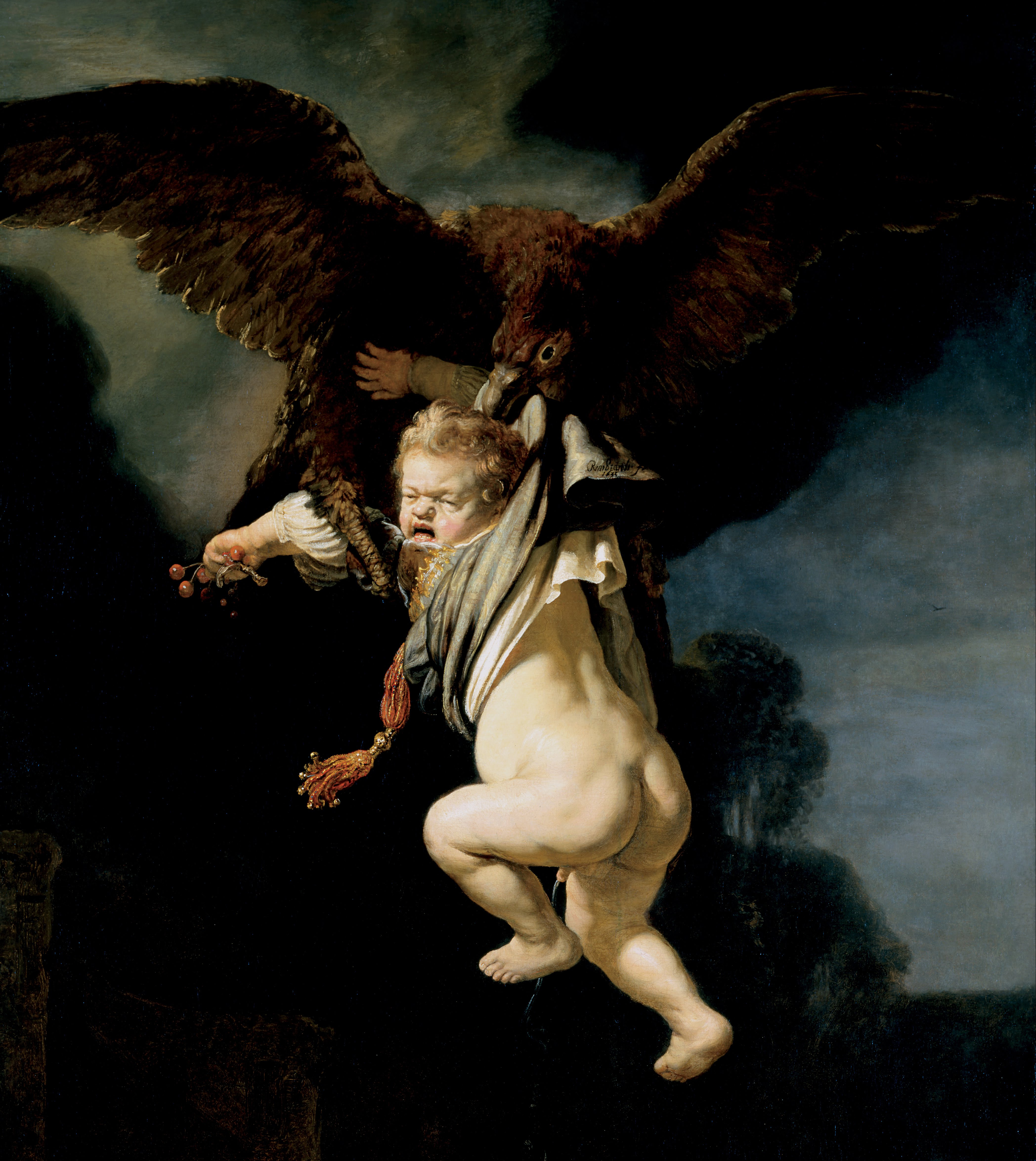
Rembrandt – The Rape of Ganymede

- Gerard ter Borch – Consultation
- Abraham Bosse – Der Ball ("The Ball")
- Chen Hongshou – Self-portrait
- Philippe de Champaigne – Louis XIII Crowned by Victory
- Dirck van Delen – Palace Courtyard with Figures
- Jan van Goyen – Landscape with travellers outside a tavern
- Juan Bautista Mayno – The Recovery of Bahía de Todos los Santos
- Rembrandt
  - The Rape of Ganymede
  - Belshazzar's Feast
  - Portrait of a Young Man with a Golden Chain (attributed)
  - The Sacrifice of Abraham
  - Self-portrait wearing a white feathered bonnet (Buckland Abbey, England)
- Guido Reni – Saint Matthew and the Angel
- Peter Paul Rubens
  - The Garden of Love (1630–1635)
  - The Three Graces
- John Souch – Sir Thomas Aston at his Wife's Deathbed
- Nicholas Stone – marble effigy of Elizabeth Carey, Lady Berkeley (St Dunstan's church, Cranford, England)
- Justus Sustermans – Portrait of Galileo
- David Teniers – Temptations of Saint Anthony
- Diego Velázquez
  - Equestrian Portrait of Philip III
  - Equestrian Portrait of Prince Balthasar Charles
  - Philip IV in Brown and Silver
  - Portrait of the Count-Duke of Olivares
  - Prince Balthasar Charles as a Hunter
  - The Surrender of Breda

== Births ==
- 21 February – Thomas Flatman, English poet and miniature painter (died 1688)
- 16 April – Frans van Mieris, Sr., Dutch genre and portrait painter (died 1681)
- 7 October – Roger de Piles, French painter, engraver, art critic and diplomat (died 1709)
- 11 November – Justus Danckerts, Dutch engraver (died 1701)
- date unknown
  - José Antolínez, Spanish painter (died 1675)
  - Pietro Santi Bartoli, Italian engraver, draughtsman and painter (died 1700)
  - Sebastiano Bombelli, Italian Baroque painter, mainly in Venice (died 1719)
  - Giuseppe Bonati, Italian painter, active in Rome and Ferrara (died 1681)
  - Guillaume Chasteau, French engraver (died 1683)
  - Alonso del Arco, Spanish painter (died 1704)
  - Ricardo do Pilar, Brazilian monk and painter (died 1700)
  - Giovanni Giacomo Borni, Italian painter active in Lombard (died 1700)
  - Pedro Nuñez de Villavicencio, Spanish painter (died 1700)
  - Henri Gascar, French painter (died 1701)
  - Antonio Giorgetti, Italian sculptor (died 1669)
  - Basilio Santa Cruz Pumacallao, Quechua painter from Cusco, Peru (died 1710)
  - Pieter van Anraedt, Dutch Golden Age painter of history scenes (died 1678)
  - Domenicus van Tol, Dutch Golden Age painter (died 1676)

== Deaths ==
- 14 March – Jacques Callot, printmaker and draughtsman from Lorraine (born 1592)
- 17 May – Domenico Tintoretto, Venetian painter, son of Jacopo Tintoretto (born 1560)
- 30 September – Kanō Sanraku, Japanese painter (born 1559)
- 25 December – Samuel de Champlain, French cartographer, draughtsman, navigator, soldier, explorer, ethnologist, diplomat, geographer, chronicler and founder of Québec City (born 1567)
- date unknown
  - Reza Abbasi, Persian miniaturist, painter and calligrapher of the Isfahan School (born 1565)
  - Camillo Berlinghieri, Italian painter of the Baroque period (born 1590/1605)
  - Krzysztof Boguszewski, Polish Baroque painter (born unknown)
  - Battistello Caracciolo, Italian painter (born 1578)
  - Giovanni Battista Crescenzi, Italian painter and architect (born 1577)
  - Willem Cornelisz Duyster, Dutch painter from Amsterdam (born 1599)
  - Francesco Lauri, Italian fresco painter (born 1610)
  - Giulio Parigi, Italian architect and designer (born 1571)
  - Fabrizio Santafede, Italian late-Mannerist painter (born 1560)
- probable – Giuseppe Vermiglio, Northern Italian Caravaggisti painter (born 1585)
