= 1771 in art =

Events from the year 1771 in art.

== Events ==
- Limoges porcelain manufacture established in France.
- 24 April – Royal Academy Exhibition of 1771 opens in Pall Mall in London
- 25 August – The Salon of 1771 opens at the Louvre in Paris

== Works ==
- Cristóbal de Aguilar – Manuel de Amat y Junient as Protector of the Monastery of the Nazarene
- Étienne Aubry – Portrait of Louis-Claude Vassé
- Pompeo Batoni – The Continence of Scipio
- Jean-Baptiste-Siméon Chardin – Self-portrait in spectacles (pastel)
- Louis-Bernard Coclers – Interior of a Foundry
- John Singleton Copley
  - Daniel Crommelin Verplanck (Metropolitan Museum of Art, New York)
  - Ezekiel Goldthwait and Mrs. Ezekiel Goldthwait (Elizabeth Lewis) (Museum of Fine Arts, Boston)
  - Portrait of John Montresor
- Nathaniel Dance-Holland – David Garrick as Richard III at Bosworth
- Jacques-Louis David – Minerva Fighting Mars (Combat de Mars contre Minerve)
- Anton Graff
  - Gotthold Ephraim Lessing
  - Moses Mendelssohn
- Jean-Antoine Houdon – Portrait bust of Diderot
- John Hamilton Mortimer – Combined portrait of Dr Daniel Solander, Sir Joseph Banks, Captain James Cook, Dr John Hawkesworth and John Montagu, 4th Earl of Sandwich
- Alexander Roslin – King Gustav III of Sweden and his Brothers
- Samuel Scott – The Thames and the Tower of London
- Claude Joseph Vernet – Seaport by Moonlight
- Francis Wheatley – Scene from Twelfth Night
- Richard Wilson
  - Dinas Bran from Llangollen
  - View near Wynnstay
- Joseph Wright of Derby
  - The Alchymist, in Search of the Philosopher’s Stone, Discovers Phosphorus, and prays for the successful conclusion of his operation, as was the custom of the Ancient Chymical Astrologers (original version)
  - The Blacksmith's Shop (two versions)
- Johan Zoffany – Portrait of George III

== Births ==
- March 16 – Antoine-Jean Gros, French painter (died 1835)
- April 13 – Jakob Wilhelm Roux, German draughtsman and painter (died 1830)
- May 2 – John Henning, Scottish sculptor and medallist (died 1851)
- May 14 – Thomas Wedgwood, pioneer photographer (died 1805)
- November 6
  - Alois Senefelder, inventor of lithography (died 1834)
  - Jovan Pačić, Serbian painter and poet (died 1849)
- November 20 – Bartolomeo Pinelli, Italian illustrator and engraver (died 1835)
- December 16 – Jean Broc, painter (died 1850)
- date unknown
  - Nikolai Ivanovich Argunov, painter and academician of the St. Petersburg Academy of Arts (died 1829)
  - John Heaviside Clark, Scottish aquatint engraver and painter of seascapes and landscapes (died 1863)
  - Samuel Elmgren, Finnish painter (died 1834)
  - John Eyre, Australian painter and engraver (died 1812)
  - William Armfield Hobday, English portrait painter and miniaturist (died 1831)
  - Thomas Richmond, English miniature-painter (died 1837)
  - Kazimierz Wojniakowski, Polish painter (died 1812)

== Deaths ==
- March 8 – Louis August le Clerc, French-born sculptor (born 1688)
- March 20 – Louis-Michel van Loo, French painter (born 1707)
- April 14 – Laurent Cars, French designer and engraver (born 1699)
- May 11 – Franz Edmund Weirotter, Austrian landscape painter (born 1733)
- September 9 – Robert Wood, British engraver gentleman and politician (born 1717)
- September 14 – Louis de Moni, Dutch genre painter (born 1698)
- date unknown
  - John Baker, English flower painter (born 1726)
  - George Bickham the Younger, English etcher, engraver, printseller, and one of the first English caricaturists (born 1706)
  - Jean Baptiste Claude Chatelain, French engraver (born 1710)
  - Charles Exshaw, Irish painter and engraver (born unknown)
  - Johan Georg Geitel, Finnish painter (born 1683)
  - Ding Guanpeng, Chinese painter in Qing Dynasty (date of birth unknown)
  - Giuseppe Marchesi, Italian painter active mainly in Bologna (born 1699)
  - Felice Polanzani, Italian engraver (born 1700)
  - Johann Preissler, German engraver (born 1698)
  - Andrea Soldi, Italian portrait painter working in London (born 1703)
- probable – Anton Giuseppe Barbazza, Italian painter and engraver of the Baroque period (born 1720)
