= Gaetano Zompini =

Italian printmaker and engraver

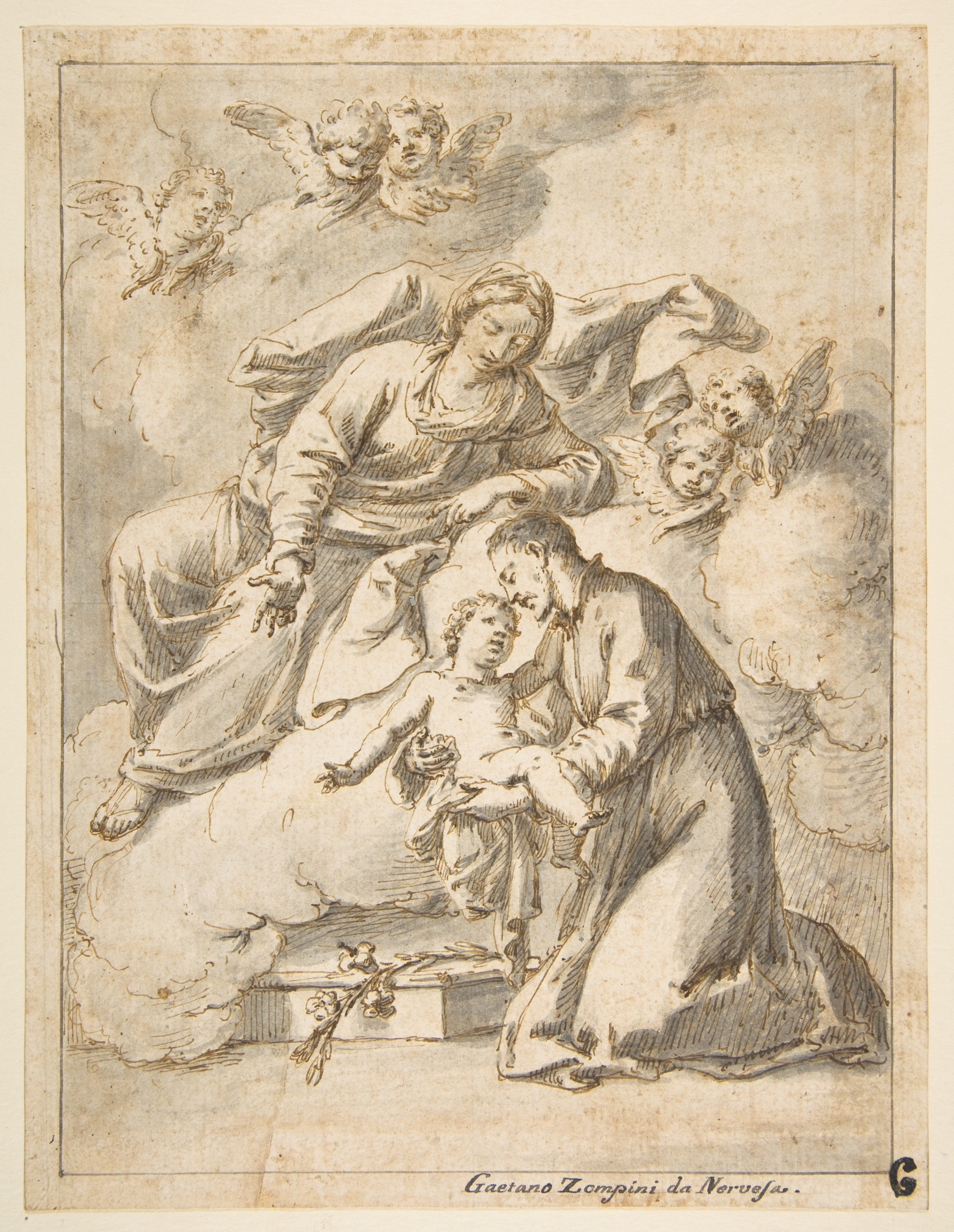
- Saint Cajetan of Thiene Holding the Infant Jesus, Metropolitan Museum of Art, New York City
- Born: 25 September 1700; Nervesa della Battaglia, Republic of Venice
- Died: 20 May 1778 (aged 77); Venice, Republic of Venice
- Education: Niccolò Bambini
- Known for: Printmaking; Engraving; Painting
- Movement: Baroque

Gaetano Zompini (25 September 1700 – 20 May 1778) was an Italian printmaker, engraver and painter, known for his prints depicting workers from the lower classes in Venice.

== Biography ==
=== Early life ===
Born in Nervesa della Battaglia, he studied when very young with Niccolò Bambini, and later became a follower of Sebastiano Ricci. Before 1733 he executed a series of frescoes for San Nicolò da Tolentino, Venice, which included the Four Evangelists on the pendentives, Old Testament scenes on the drum, and, in the dome, the Holy Trinity. Of another early fresco cycle, in the church of the Servi at Gradisca d'Isonzo, near Gorizia, only the vault fresco, the Apparition of the Blessed Virgin in Glory, survives.

=== Career ===
Zompini’s most considerable work as a history painter was a series of eight dramatic canvases, in a style reminiscent of Ricci and Giovanni Battista Tiepolo, of scenes from Homer and Virgil, and seven monochrome overdoors representing Olympian deities, on a gold background, painted for the Palazzo Zinelli, Venice (all 1736; Moszna Castle, near Kujau, Silesia, Tiele-Winckler priv. col.)

In 1737 Zompini made drawings for the illustrations for Rutzvanscad il Giovane, a comedy by ‘Panchiano Catuffio Babulco’ (Zaccaria Valaresso), his first contribution to book illustration. There followed, in the 1740s and early 1750s, a series of altarpieces for churches in Venice and the Veneto; these include the Virgin of the Carmelites with St. Joseph and St. Teresa (1740; Arcate, San Lorenzo) and two canvases, Esther before Ahasuerus and Rebecca at the Well (1748–9; Venice, Scuola Grande dei Carmini).

=== Etchings ===
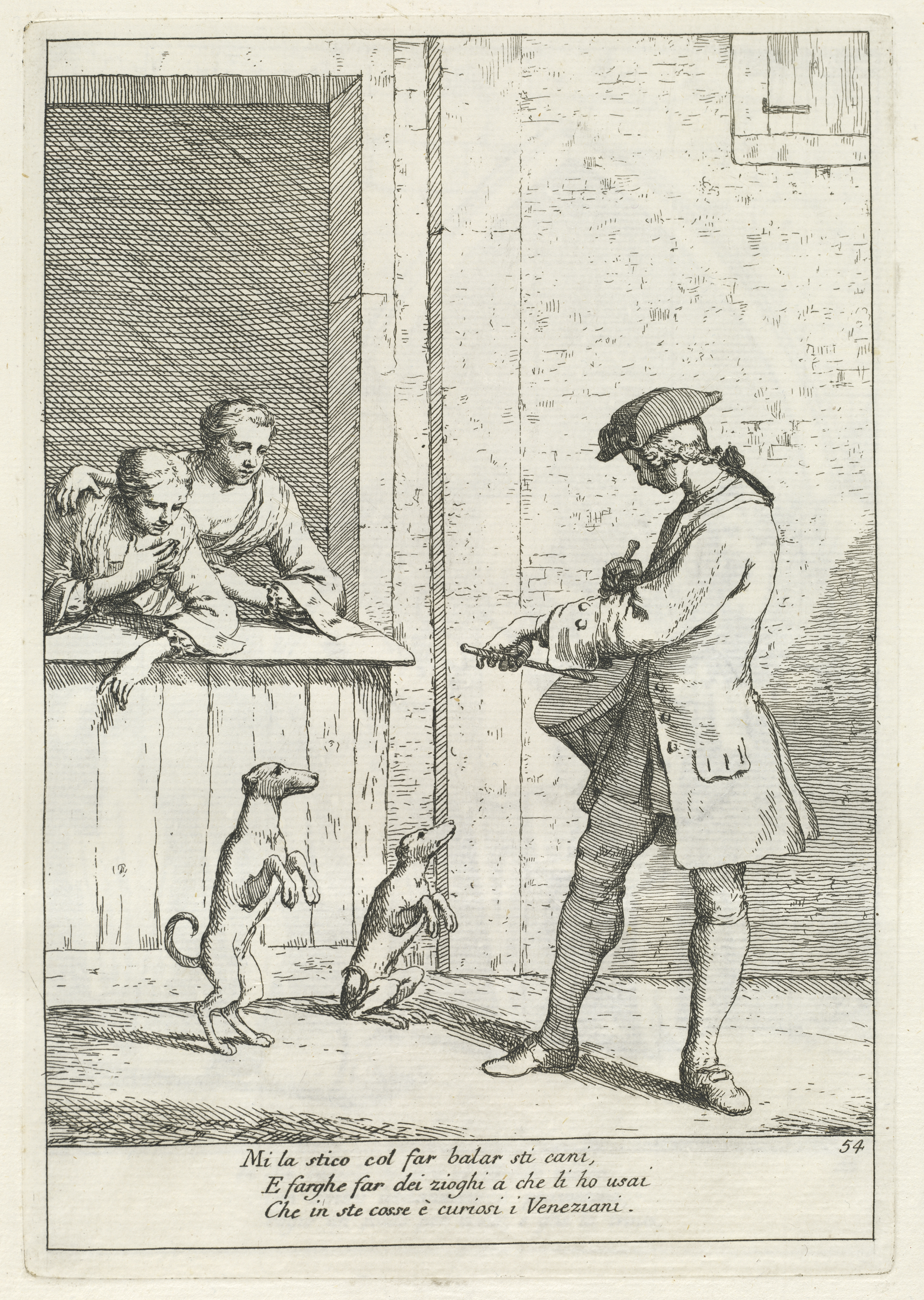
Draper. Etching from Le arti che vanno per via nella città di Venezia (1753)

Zompini remained a limited painter, and achieved only modest works in a provincial academic style, but he is better known as an etcher. Encouraged by Antonio Maria Zanetti, he began, c. 1750, to make a series of drawings of Venetian traders and hawkers. He later etched these drawings and they were published in Le arti che vanno per via nella città di Venezia (1753). A volume of 95 preparatory drawings, which once belonged to Zanetti, is in the Museo Correr, Venice.

Le arti is a highly original work which suggests, with vivid immediacy, and in a forceful, almost crude technique, the harsh reality of the daily life of the Venetian people. The etchings contrast sharply with the fantasies of Tiepolo, and with the Grand Tourist’s world of masque and carnival. At times, they recall the painted work of Pietro Longhi and other genre painters of Northern Italy.

In 1756 Zompini was elected to the Accademia Veneziana di Pittura, and towards the end of the 1750s produced another set of etchings, in a lighter, more refined style, entitled Vari capricci e paesi. This is composed of twelve prints after drawings by Giovanni Benedetto Castiglione, which formed part of Zanetti’s collection, and of which three illustrated the theme of the Education of Achilles. Zompini also etched St. Jerome, St. Lawrence and St. Prospero, after Paolo Veronese and produced two of the prints for the series Le dieci stazioni della vita di Maria.

Around this time Zompini produced designs for fine illustrated editions of Italian classics published by Antonio Zatta, among them Le Rime del Petrarca (Venice, 1757), La Divina Commedia di Dante Alighieri (Venice, 1757) and, after the death of his patron Zanetti in 1767, L’Orlando Furioso di M. Ludovico Ariosto (Venice, 1772–3). Zompini found himself in financial difficulties after the death of Zanetti and, having lost his sight, his last years were spent in great poverty. He died in Venice on 20 May 1778.

== Legacy ==
Zanetti's works enjoyed considerable success in England after his death. An edition of Le arti was published in Venice in 1785 by John Strange, British Resident in Venice, who also reprinted the Vari capricci e paesi in 1786. Three further editions of Le arti were published in London between 1787 and 1803.

== Gallery ==
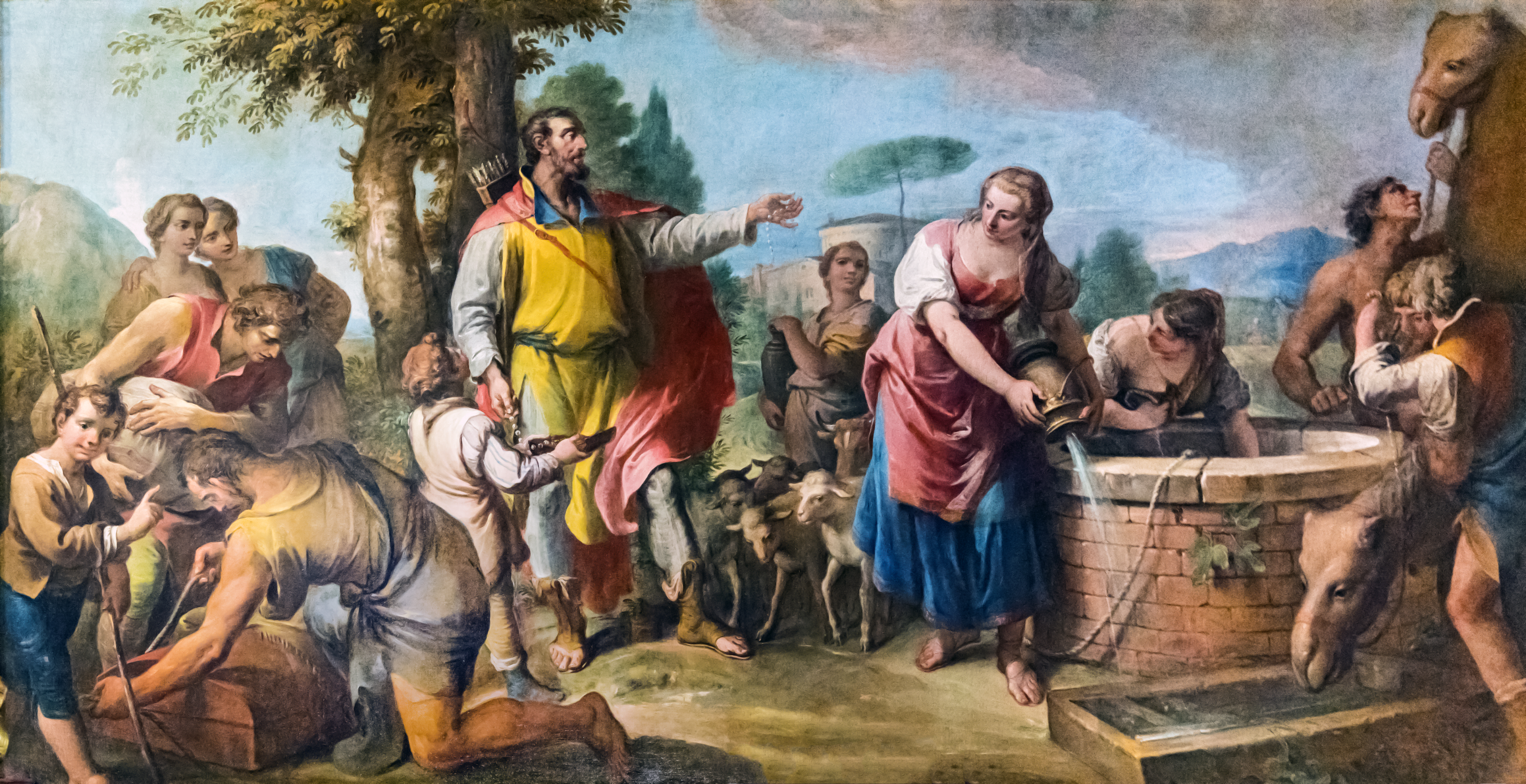
Rebecca at the Well, c. 1745, Scuola Grande dei Carmini, Venice

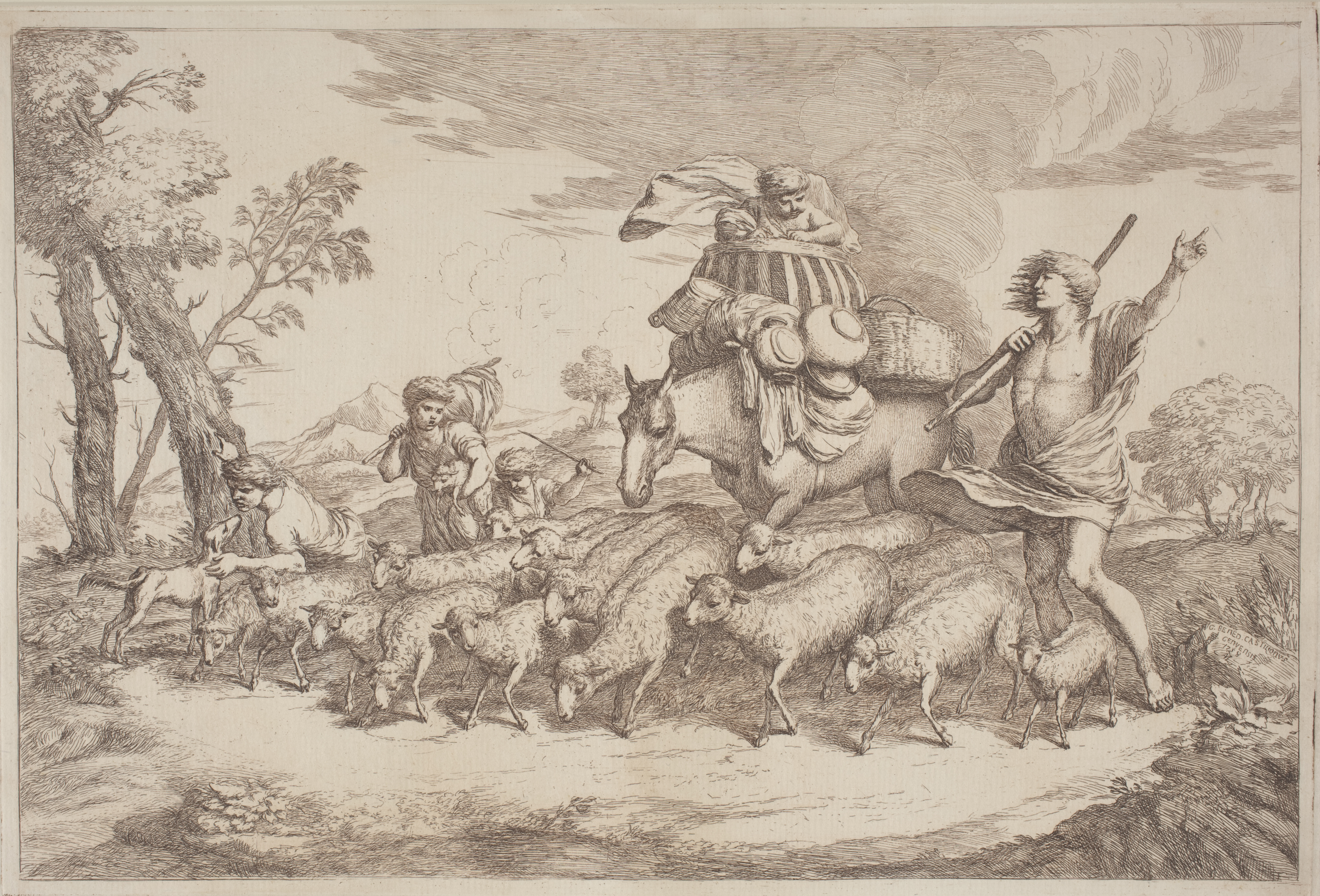
A Pastoral Journey with a Child in a Basket on Horseback, 1758-1759, National Gallery of Art, Washington, D.C.

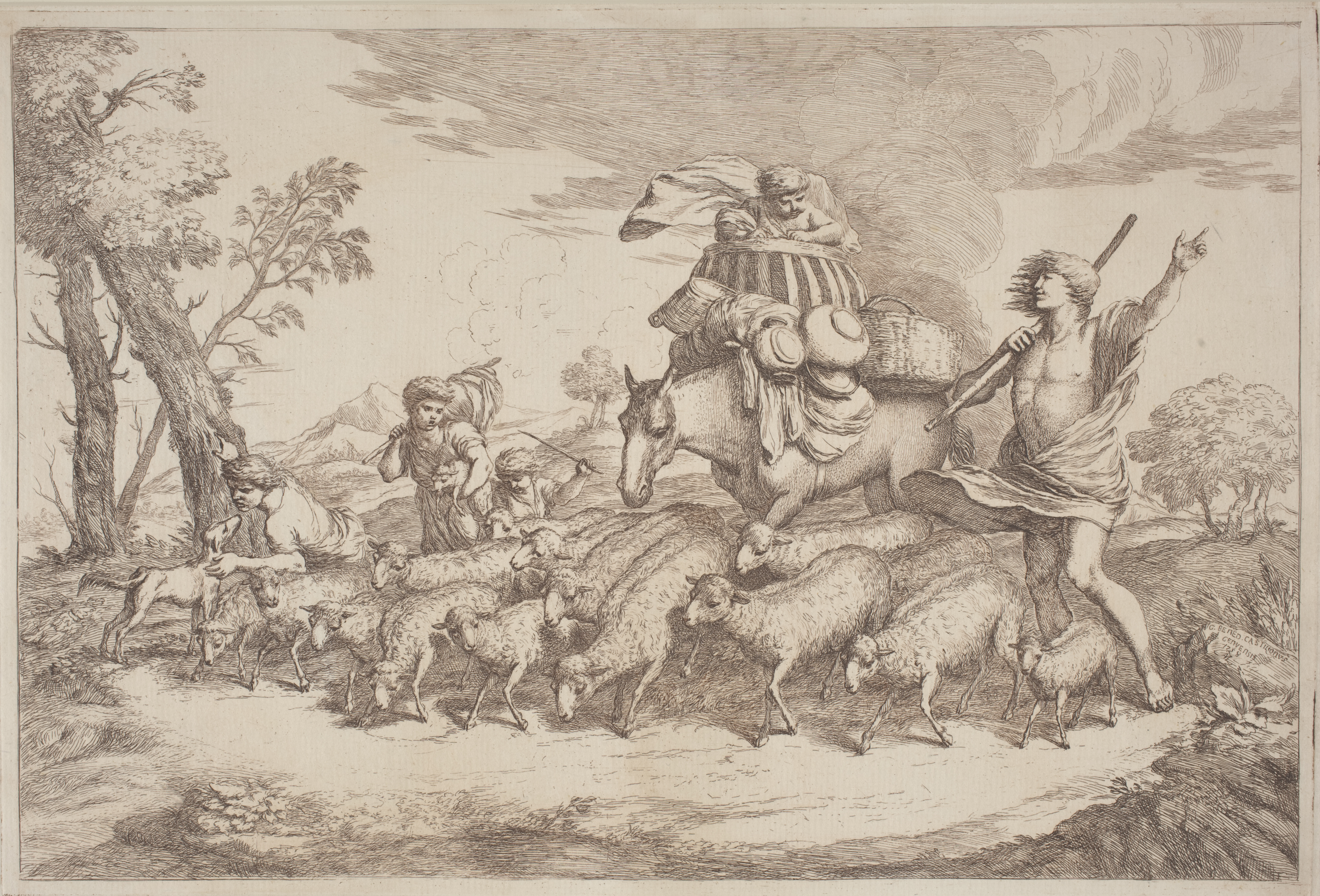
A Pastoral Journey with a Child in a Basket on Horseback, 1758-1759, National Gallery of Art, Washington, D.C.

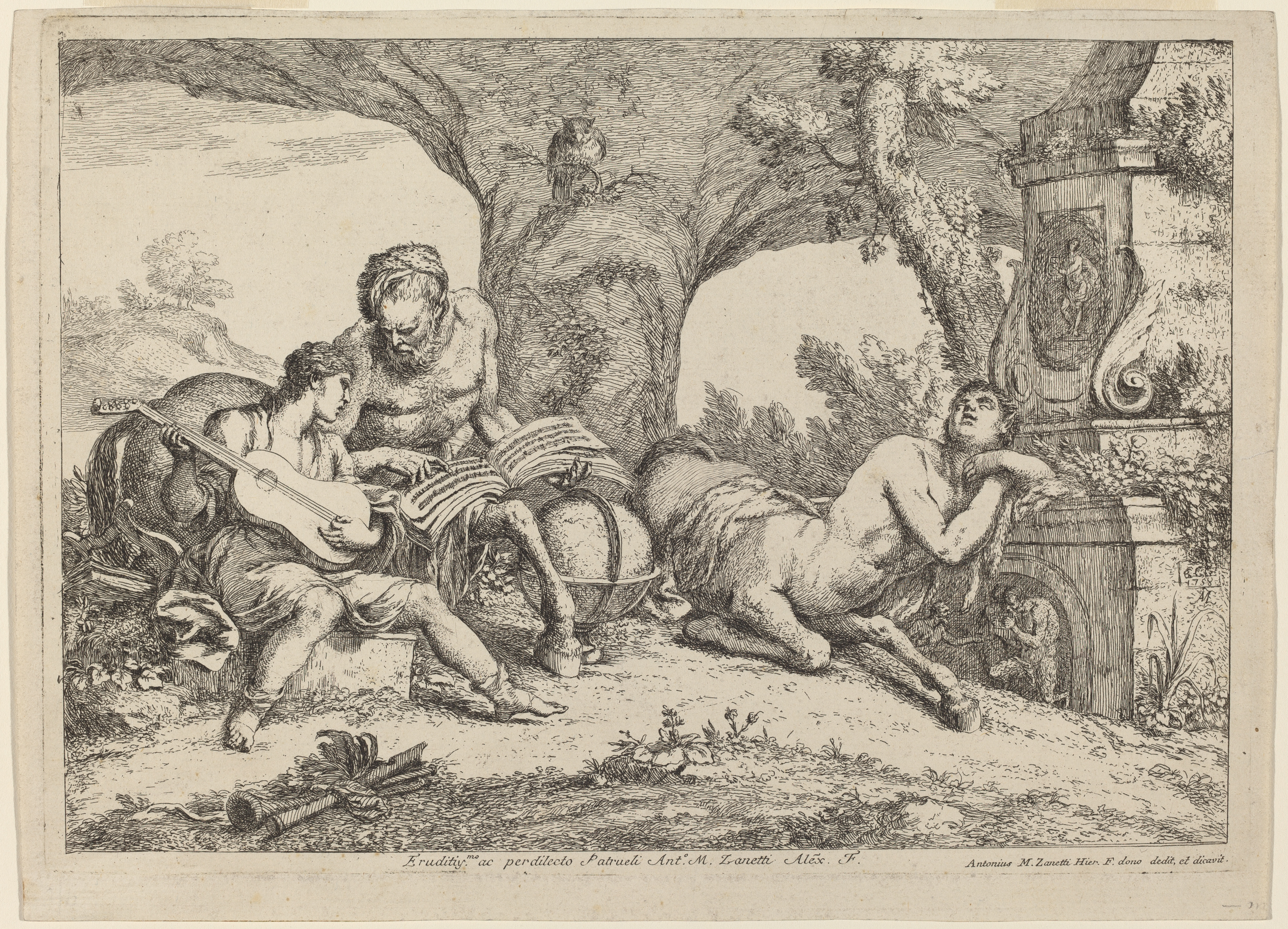
Chiron Teaching Music to Achilles, 1758, National Gallery of Art, Washington, D.C.

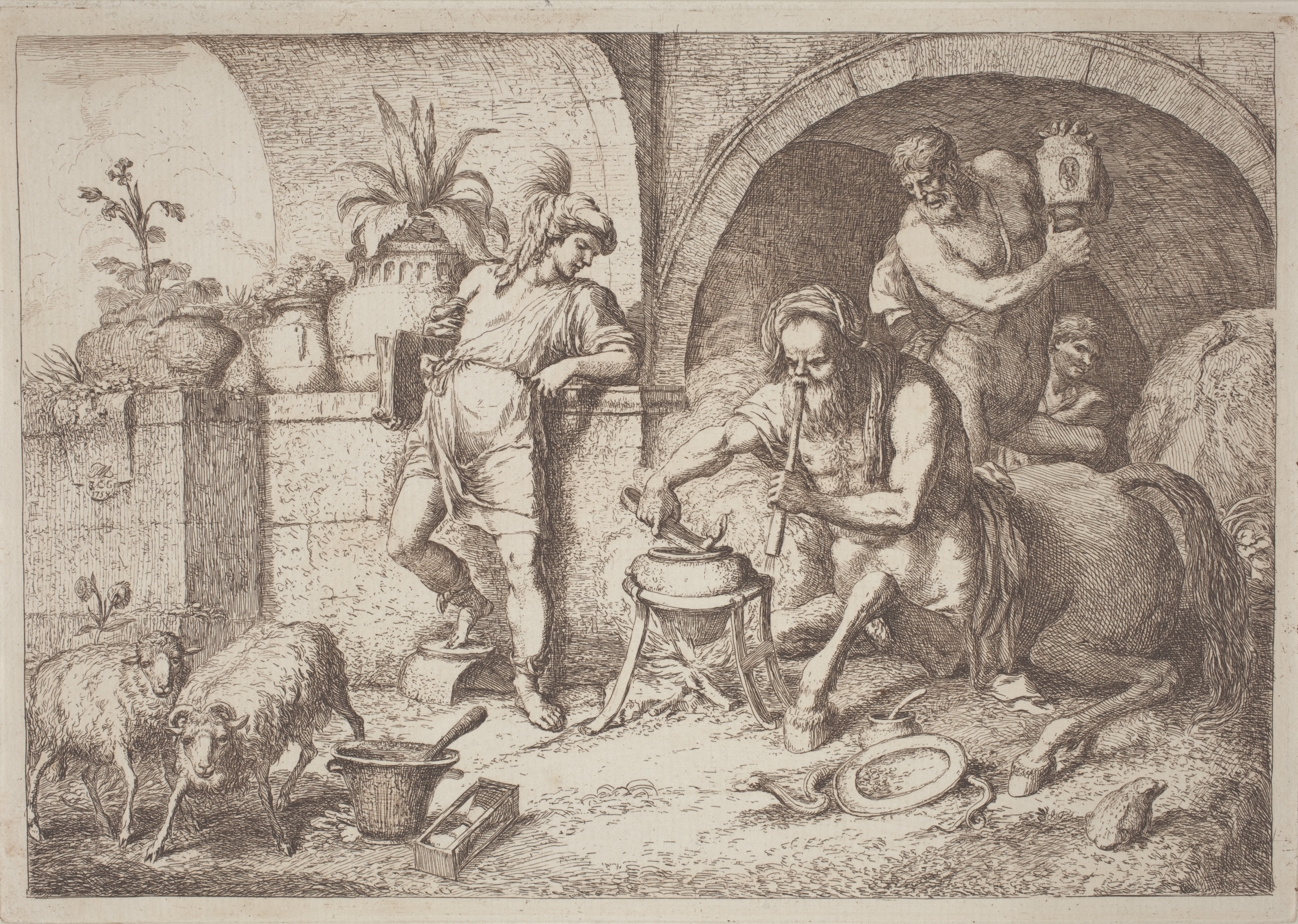
Chiron Teaches Magic to Achilles, 1758-1759, National Gallery of Art, Washington, D.C.

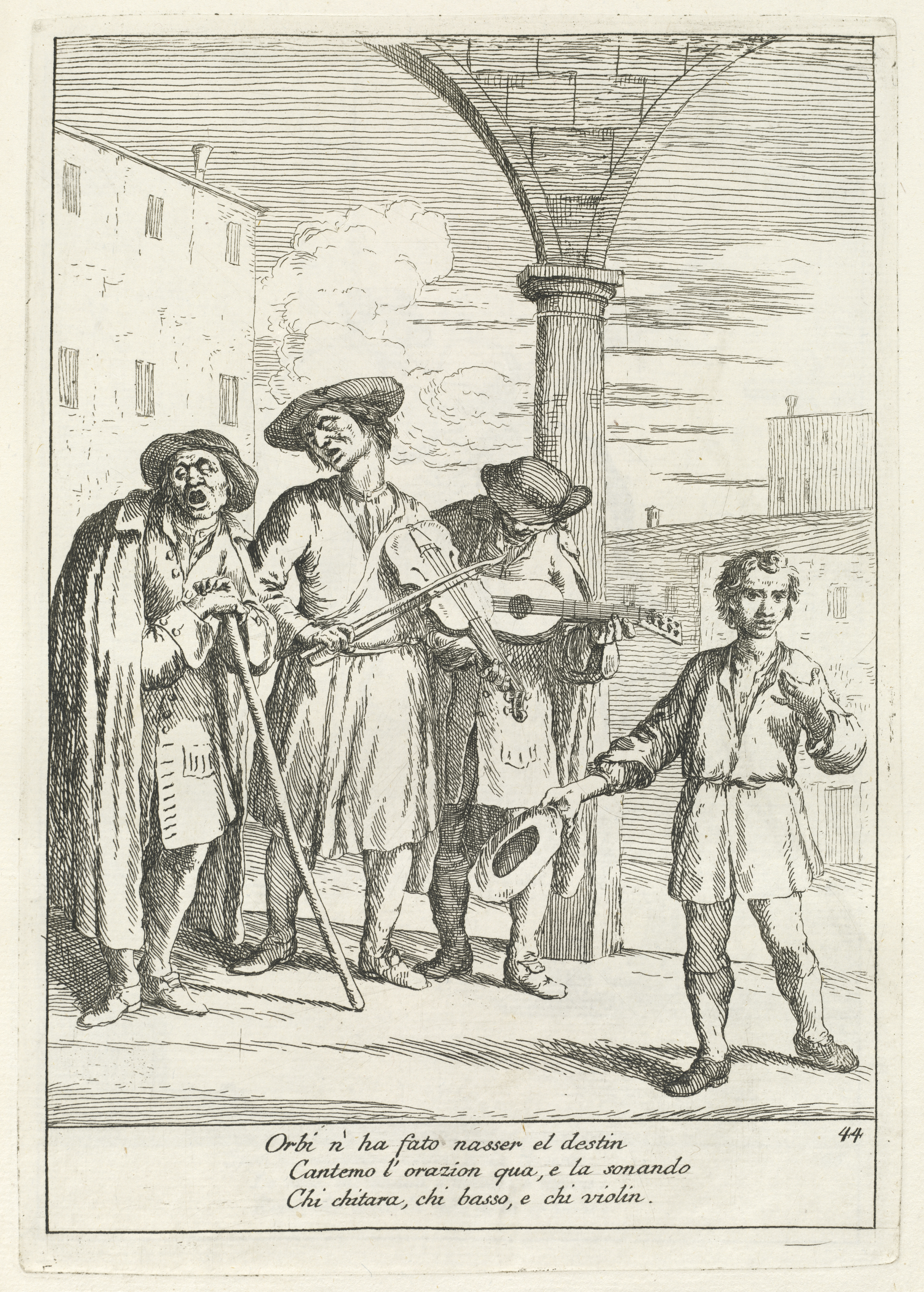
Street Entertainer, 1753, National Gallery of Art, Washington, D.C.
