= Charles III's Departure for Spain, Seen from the Sea =

Painting by Antonio Joli in the Museo del Prado, Madrid

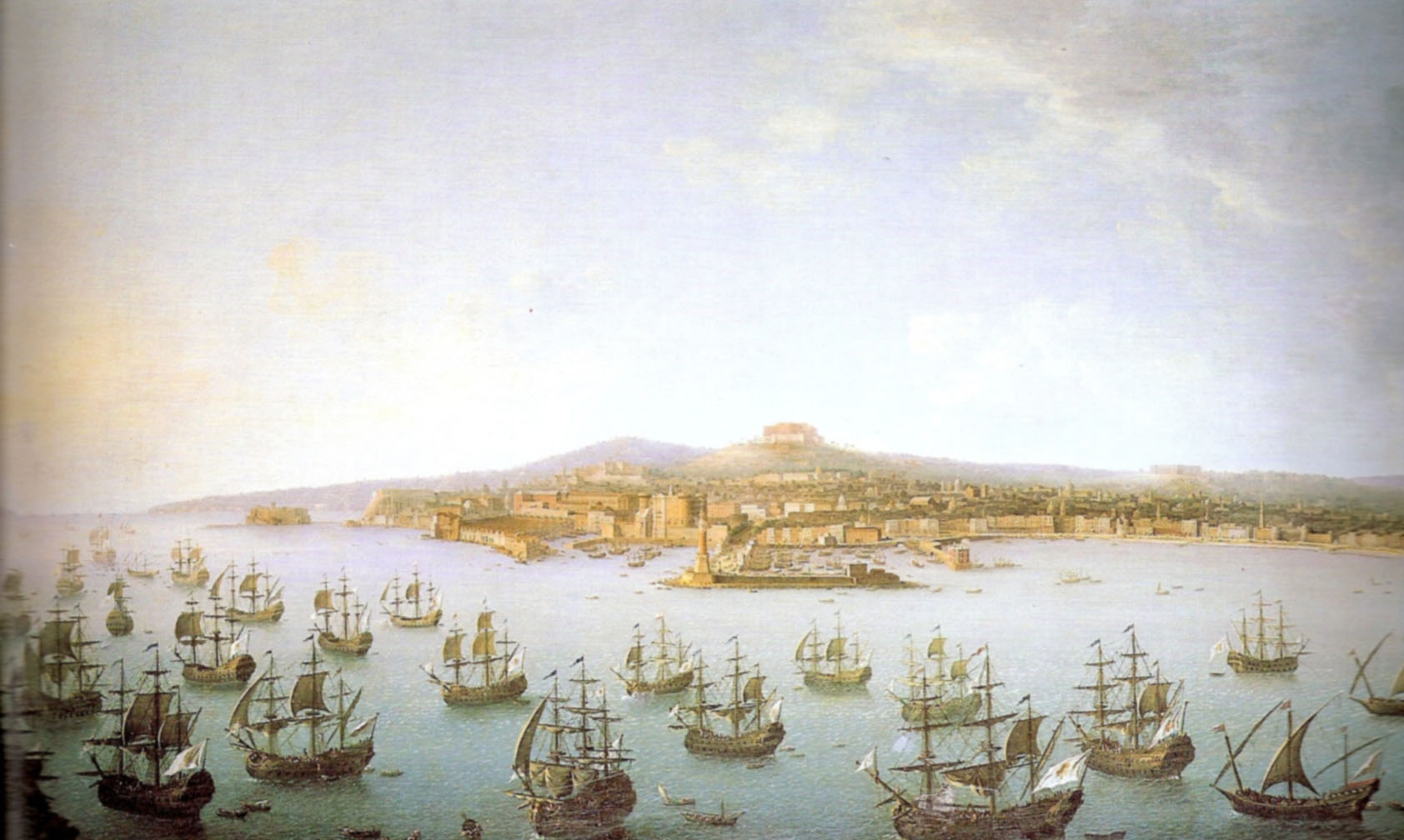

Charles III's Departure for Spain, Seen from the Sea is a 1759 oil on canvas painting by Antonio Joli, showing Charles leaving Naples to be crowned king of Spain after the death of his two elder brothers. It and its pair Charles III's Departure for Spain, Seen from the Land are now in the Museo del Prado in Madrid.

== History and description ==
The painting was created in 1759 by Antonio Joli at the express will of the Neapolitan court to immortalize the departure of Charles III from Naples, following the death of his two older brothers, when he became king of Spain: it is an event which had a notable resonance in the European courts, so much so that it is portrayed in numerous works such as those preserved at the Palazzo della Prefettura in Naples, the Prado Museum, the Kunsthistorisches Museum and the Spanish embassy in Lisbon, which was lost in 1973; the one kept in room 33 of the Capodimonte Museum, in the area of the Appartamente Reale of the Capodimonte palace was made in duplicate but with a different point of view: one from the sea, the other from the ground.

The painting presents in the foreground the royal fleet departing from the port of Naples towards Spain, which took place on 7 October 1759, while in the background the city of Naples is depicted: the painter uses the classic seventeenth-century scheme of a location taken from the sea, defined at a bird's eye view. In addition to the view of the port, Castel Sant'Elmo stands out and the hill on which it is built is still devoid of urbanization; the hill on the right where the Reggia di Capodimonte is depicted is also particular: however, this is an unrealistic vision, as in that period only the first courtyard of the building was created, while in the canvas is portrayed what must have been the drafted project by Giovanni Antonio Medrano.

== Sources ==
- Mario Sapio, Il Museo di Capodimonte, Napoli, Arte'm, 2012. ISBN 978-88-569-0303-4
- Touring Club Italiano, Museo di Capodimonte, Milano, Touring Club Editore, 2012. ISBN 978-88-365-2577-5
