= Charles III's Departure for Spain, Seen from the Land =

Painting by Antonio Joli in the National Museum of Capodimonte, Naples

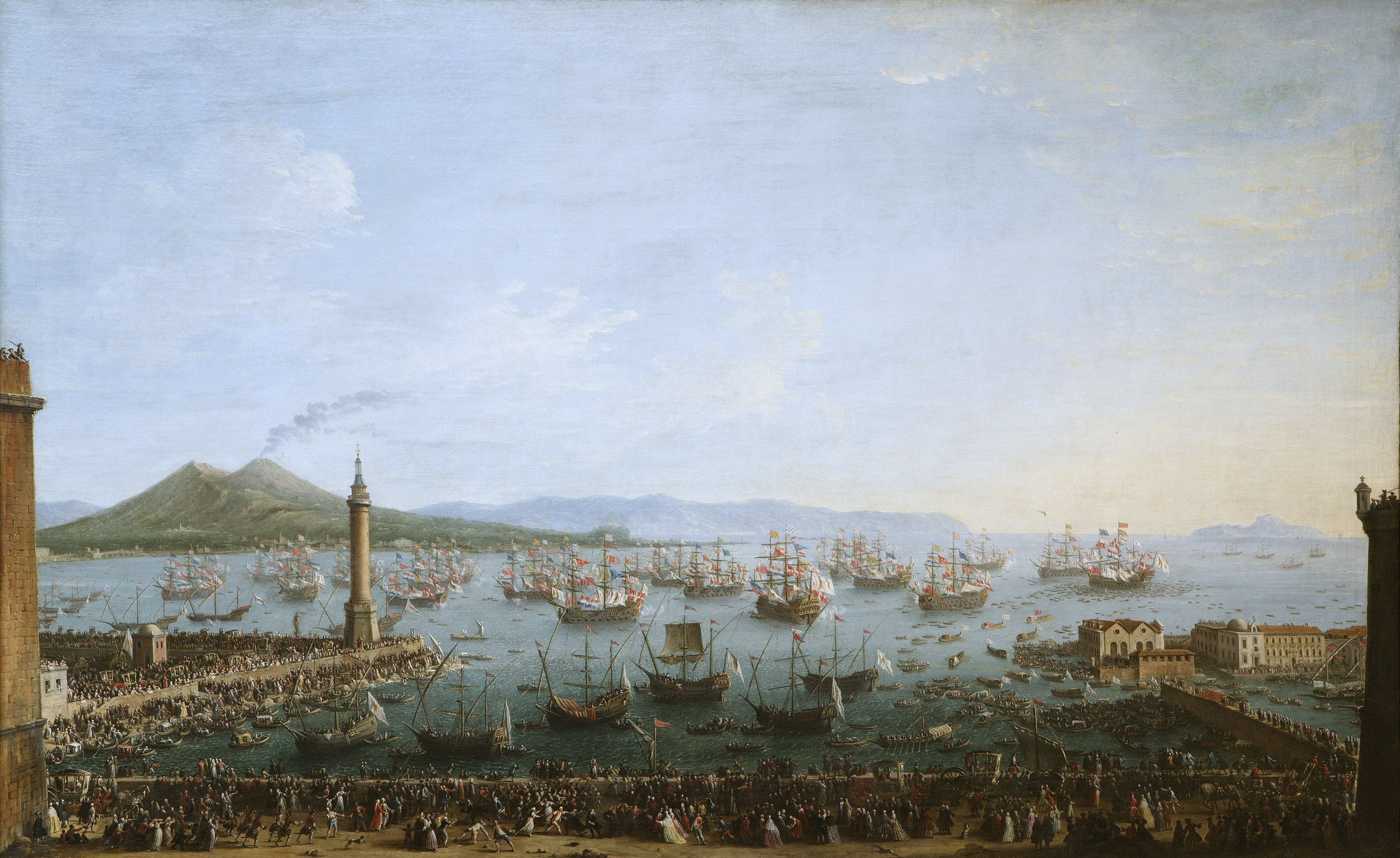

Charles III's Departure for Spain, Seen from the Land is a 1759 oil on canvas painting by Antonio Joli, showing Charles leaving Naples to be crowned king of Spain after the death of his two elder brothers. It and its pair Charles III's Departure for Spain, Seen from the Sea are now in the Museo del Prado in Madrid.

== Bibliography ==
- Mario Sapio, Il Museo di Capodimonte, Napoli, Arte'm, 2012. ISBN 978-88-569-0303-4
- Touring Club Italiano, Museo di Capodimonte, Milano, Touring Club Editore, 2012. ISBN 978-88-365-2577-5
