= Cristóbal de Aguilar =

Peruvian painter

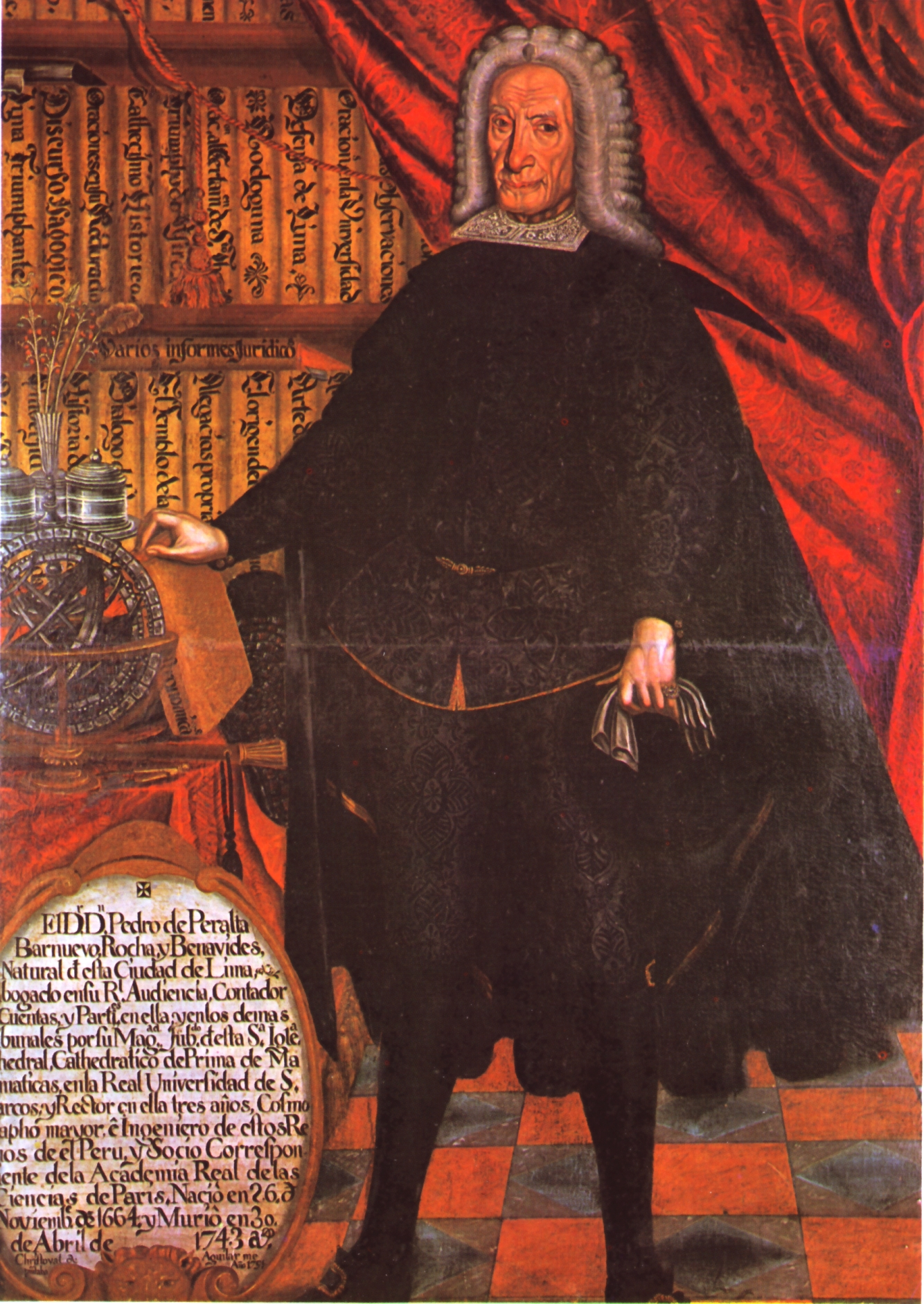
Cristobal de Aguilar

Cristóbal de Aguilar (born 18th century) was a Peruvian painter. He specialized in portraying members of Lima's nobility and the political elite of the Viceroyalty of Peru.

Aguilar was a criollo born in Lima. He began his artistic career as a portraitist of nuns, monks, and professors. In 1756, for example, he painted the portrait of the nun María del Espíritu Santo Matoso. He had previously created the popular posthumous image of Barnuevo Pedro de Peralta.

Appreciation for his work increased significantly, to the point that he was called before Manuel de Amat y Juniet. Aguilar painted Amat several times; his most famous image, painted in 1771, depicts Amat as the protector of the monastery of the Nazarene.

== Known works ==
- Portrait of José Bernardo de Tagle y Bracho, I Marquis de Torre Tagle (attributed)
- Portrait of Rosa Juliana Sánchez de Tagle, I Marquesa de Torre Tagle (attributed)
- Portrait of Nicolasa Ontañón y Valverde, III Condesa de las Lagunas (attributed)
