= Krzysztof Boguszewski =

Polish Baroque painter

St. Martin of Tours, 1628

Krzysztof Boguszewski of Ostoja coat of arms, Clan Ostoja (died 1635) was a Polish Baroque painter.

He was son of August and raised in Chełmno County, by a family that was part of Clan of Ostoja. In early years Krzysztof mastered his skills in Gdańsk under the supervision of Herman Han. Then in 1623 he was appointed painter by king Sigismund III Vasa to work for the Crown. Between 1627 and 1631 he worked on paintings showing the Battle of Grunwald in the Town Hall of Gdańsk. In 1628 he worked in the Abbacy of Gościkowo-Paradyż instructed by Abbot Marek Łętowski. There he produced four paintings of which of St. Paul remained in the Abbacy and the others like St. Martin of Tours were moved to the Poznań Cathedral.

He became priest in St Adalbert's (Wojciech) Church in Poznań in 1631 where he also found his final resting place in 1635. In the church he painted a picture of a Guarding angel and founded the altar.

== See also ==
- Ostoja coat of arms
- Clan of Ostoja
