= Saint Matthew and the Angel (Reni) =

Painting by Guido Reni

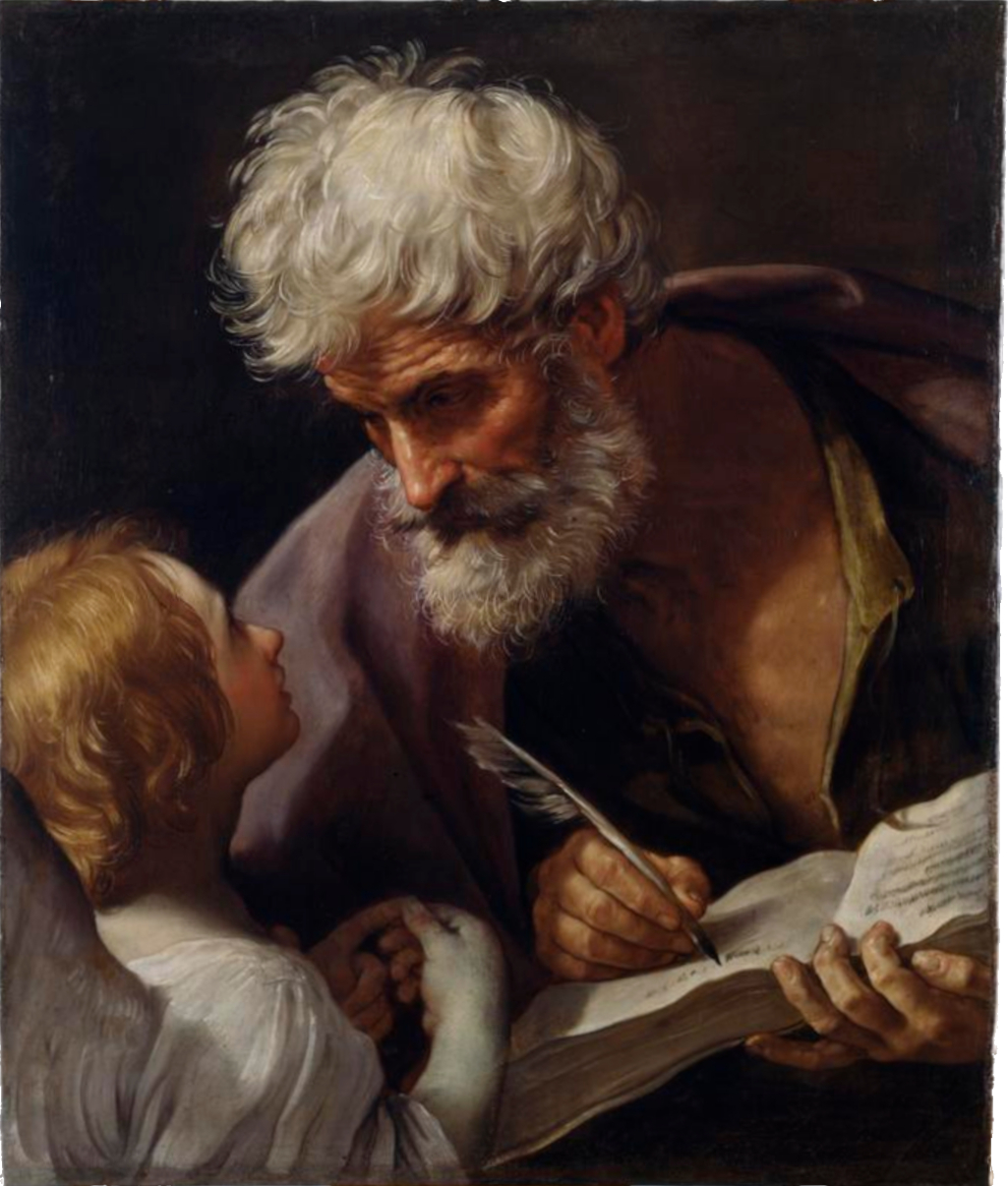
Saint Matthew and the Angel (c. 1635) by Guido Reni

Saint Matthew and the Angel is a c. 1635 oil on canvas painting by Guido Reni. After being given to the Holy See in 1924 by Antonio Castellano of Naples it long hung in Santa Maria della Concezione dei Cappuccini. It was misattributed to Lucio Massari from 1955 until 2010. It regained its true attribution thanks to a 1642 identification document found on its reverse and now hangs in the Pinacoteca Vaticana, also in Rome.
