= Samuel Elmgren =

Finnish painter (1771–1834)

Samuel Elmgren (1771–1834) was a Finnish painter.

Elmgren was born in Turku. He was commissioned to primarily paint religious-themed murals and altarpieces for churches. Between 1830 and 1832 he painted the church of Ilomantsi with one hundred angels, a number of bible characters and stories, and also the altarpiece. His works also include altar paintings and decorations for the Leppävirta church, and the altarpiece for the Kiihtelysvaara wooden church in 1831. He died at Ilomantsi in 1834.
