= Zaccaria Valaresso =

Italian poet

Zaccaria Valaresso (1700 - 23 March 1769) was an Italian poet and satirist, active in Venice.

== Biography ==
Zaccaria was born in Venice to a patrician family, and in 1724 published a play titled Il Rutzvanscad il Giovane, arcisopratragichissima tragedia, elaborata ad uso del buon gusto de'Grecheggianti compositori (1743) under the pseudonym of Cattuffio Panchiano. It was acclaimed in its day and republished as part of collections of comedies.

The Valersso play is viewed as a satire of the erudite tragedy of Ulisse il Giovanni by Domenico Lazzarini. The satire is notable for its striking final act, occurring after the prior act the characters marched into battle, in which:

The stage remains empty, and when the audience makes a lot of noise, calling out the actors, and bangs on the floor, the prompter comes out with a letter in hand, and with a candle, and then says the following verses:

Audience, I realize that you are waiting for news of the battle to be brought by someone, But you wait for it in vain: They are all dead.

End of tragedy.
