= Antonio Joli =

Italian painter (1700–1777)

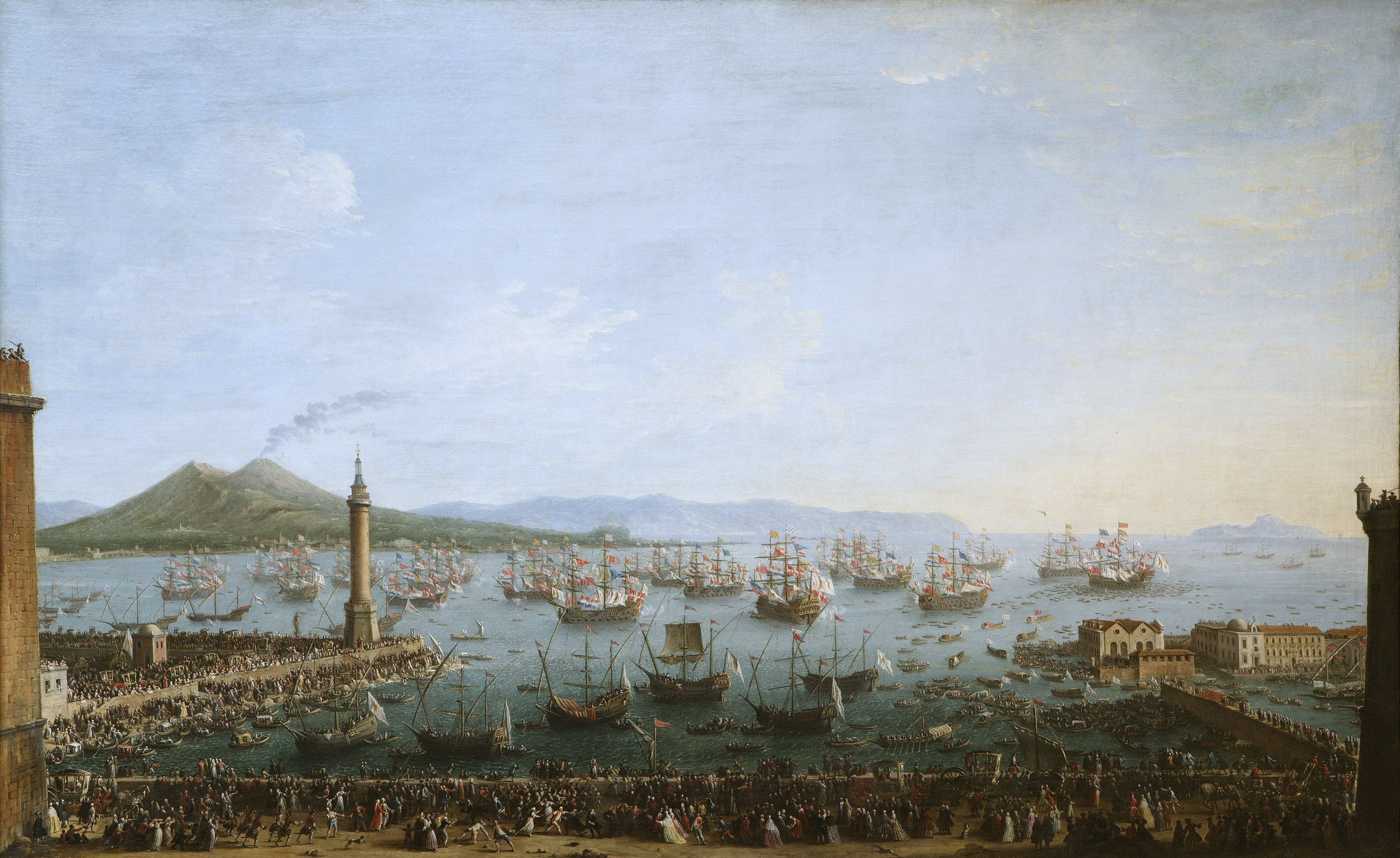
- Antonio Joli, Departure of Charles III of Spain from Naples, Museo del Prado, 1759 - he also painted a pair, showing the view from the sea.
- Born: 13 March 1700; Modena
- Died: 29 April 1777 (aged 77); Naples
- Movement: vedutisti

Antonio Francesco Lodovico Joli (13 March 1700 – 29 April 1777) was an Italian painter of vedute and capricci.

== Biography ==
Born in Modena, he first was apprenticed to Rafaello Rinaldi. He then studied in Rome under Giovanni Paolo Panini, and in the studios of the Galli da Bibbiena family of scene-painters. He became a painter of stage sets in Modena and Perugia. In 1732 he moved to Venice, where he worked as stage-painter for opera productions at the Teatro di San Giovanni Grisostomo and the Teatro San Samuele of the Grimani family.

In 1742 he went to Dresden, and then to London (1744–48) and Madrid (1750–54). In London, he decorated the Richmond mansion of John James Heidegger, then the director of the King's Theatre in the Haymarket. In 1749 Joli left London and went to Madrid where he was also involved in scene painting for the royal court, both at the Coliseo at Buen Retiro, the royal palace then just outside Madrid, and at the smaller opera house at the palace at Aranjuez.

The opera performances for which he painted scenery were directed by Farinelli. He also made large-sized paintings of the Esquadra del Tajo, the fleet of royal barges and other vessels on the river Tajo at Aranjuez. Joli returned to Venice in 1754, where he became one of the 36 founding members of the Accademia di Belle Arti di Venezia. He moved to the Bourbon court of Naples in 1761, and died there on 29 April 1777.

== Gallery ==
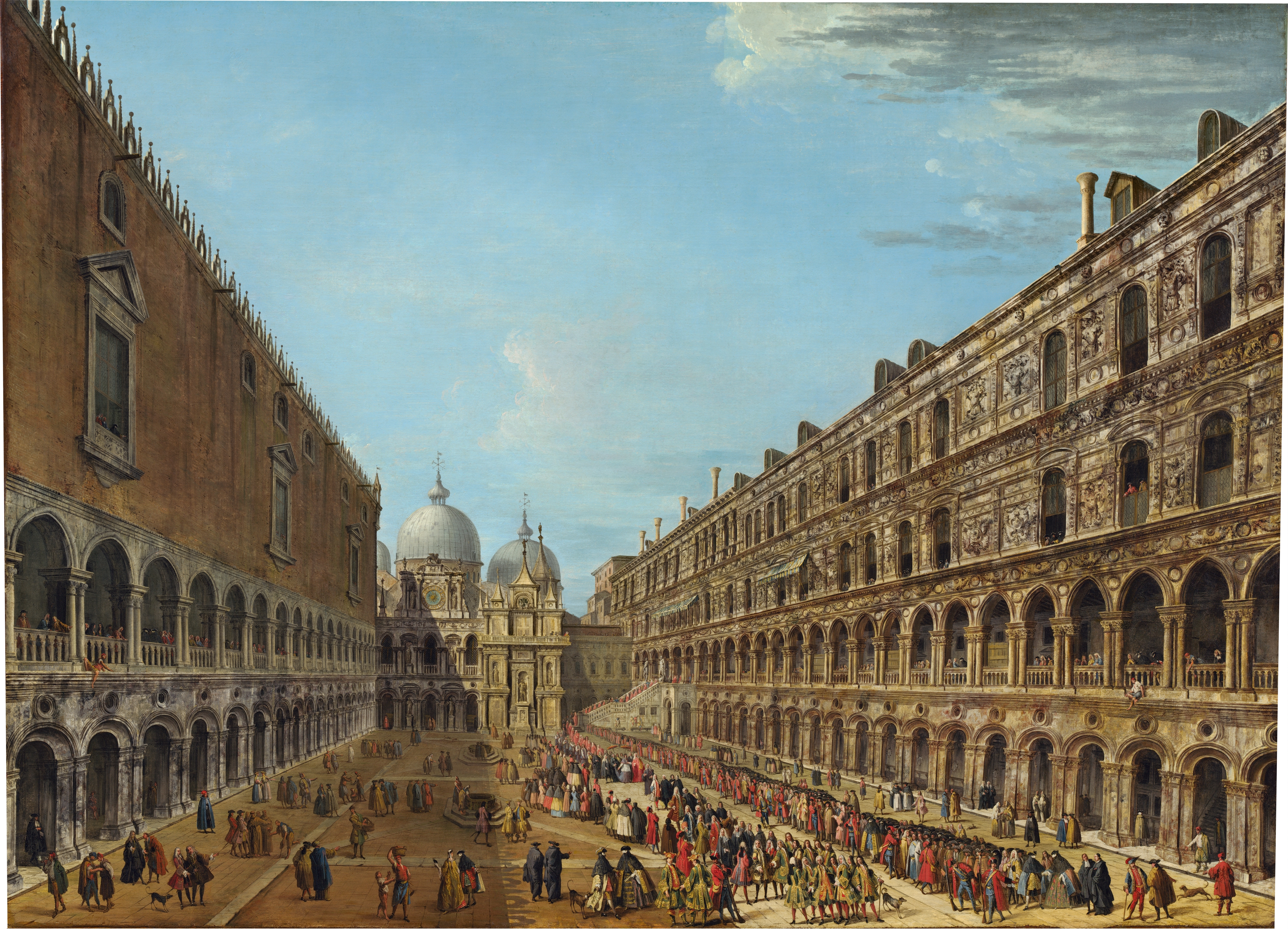
The departure of the nuncio Stoppani from the Doge's Palace after his audience; National Gallery of Art, Washington

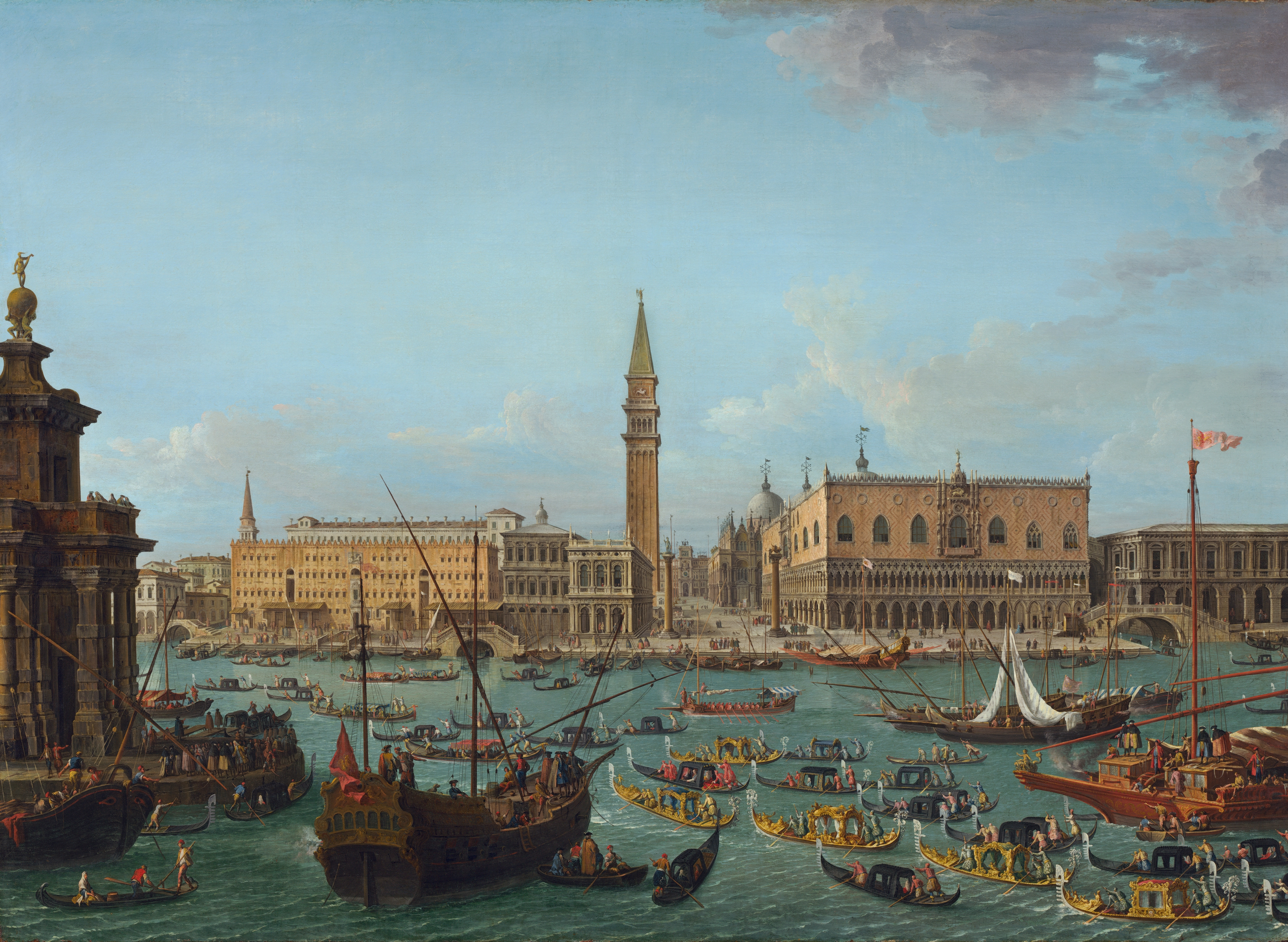
The greeting of Nuncio Stoppani, 1741; National Gallery of Art, Washington

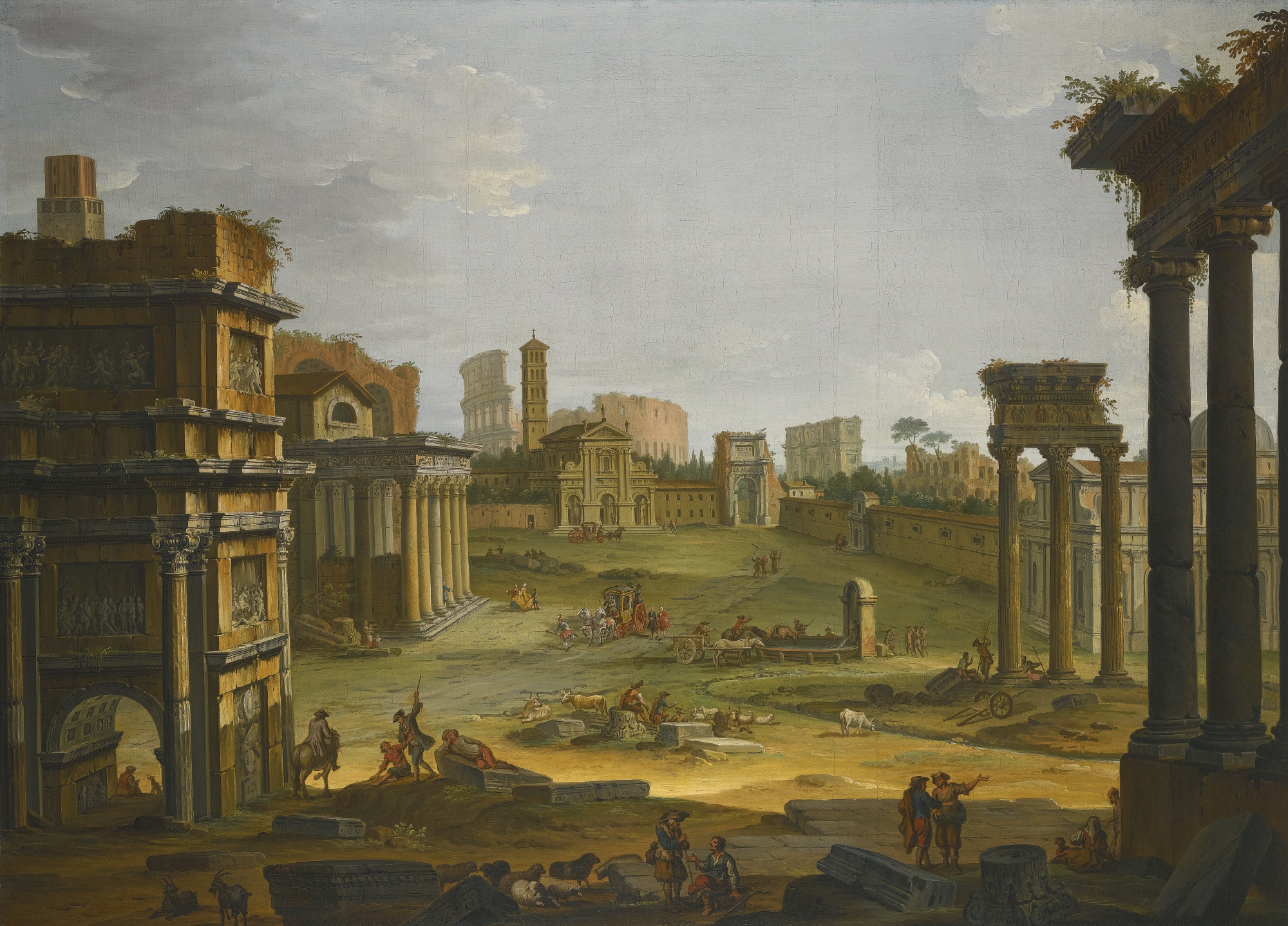
Rome, A View of the Forum with the Campo Vaccino, the church of Santa Francesca and the Colosseum

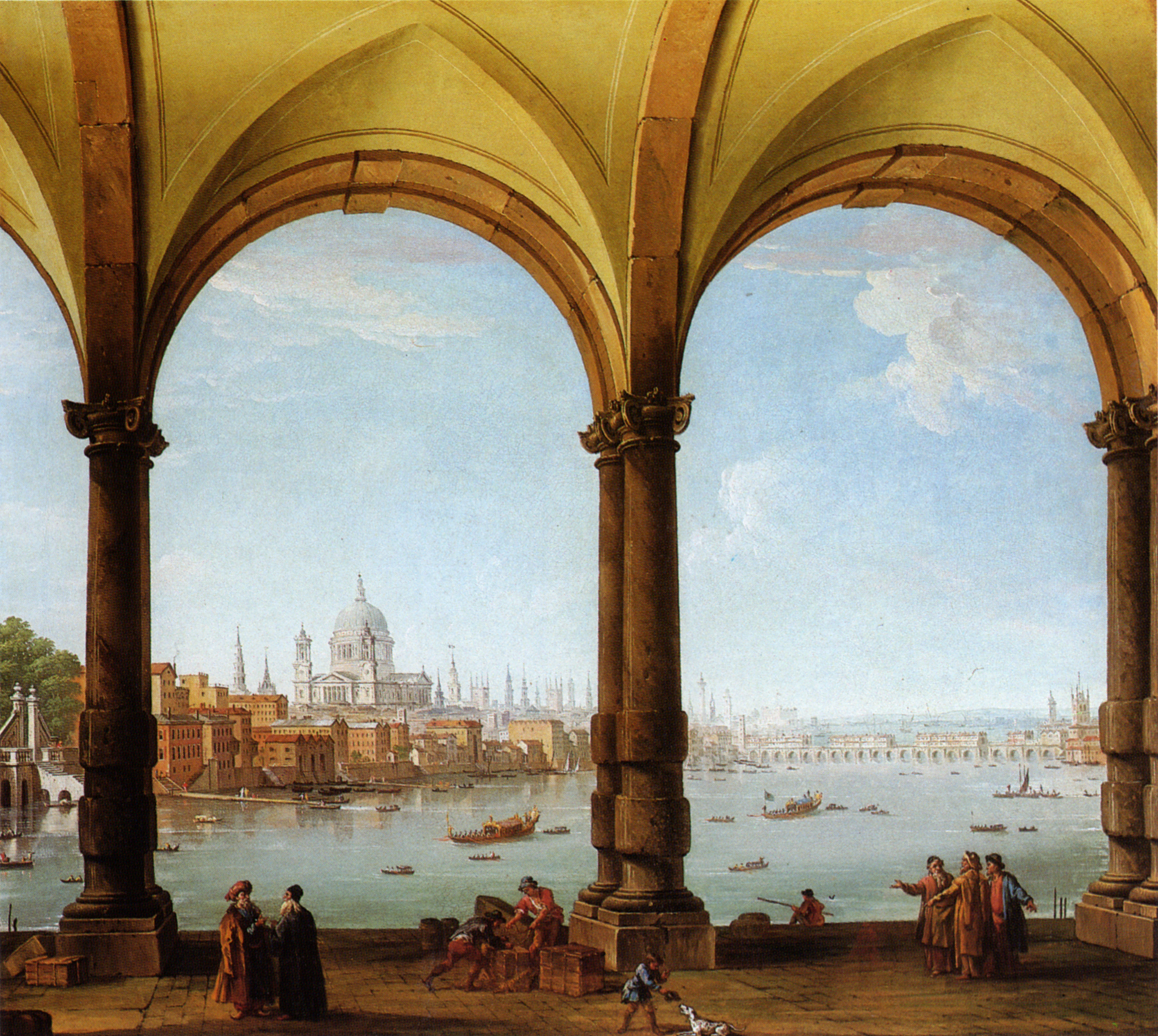
Prospect of London

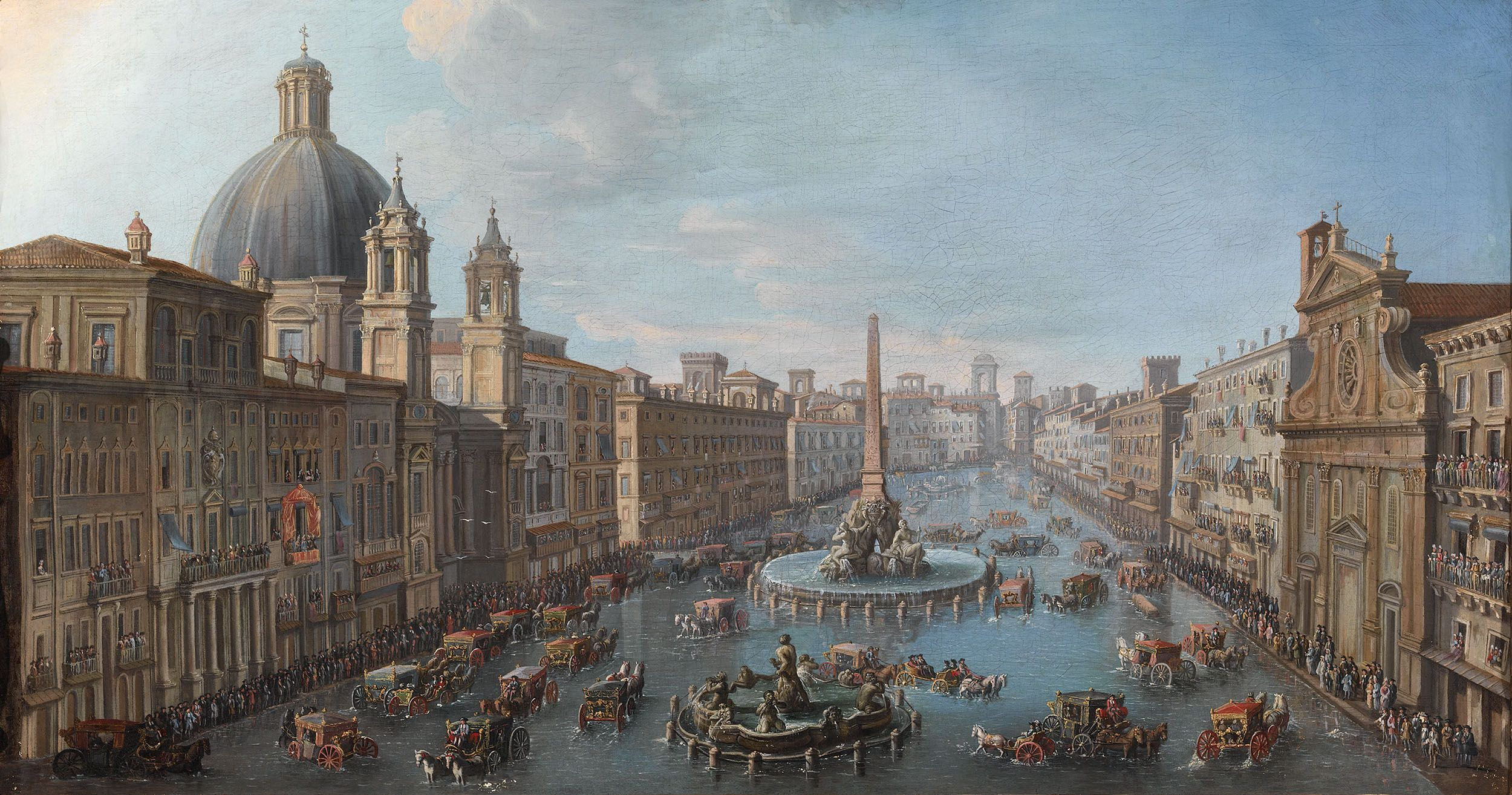
Piazza Navona Allagata

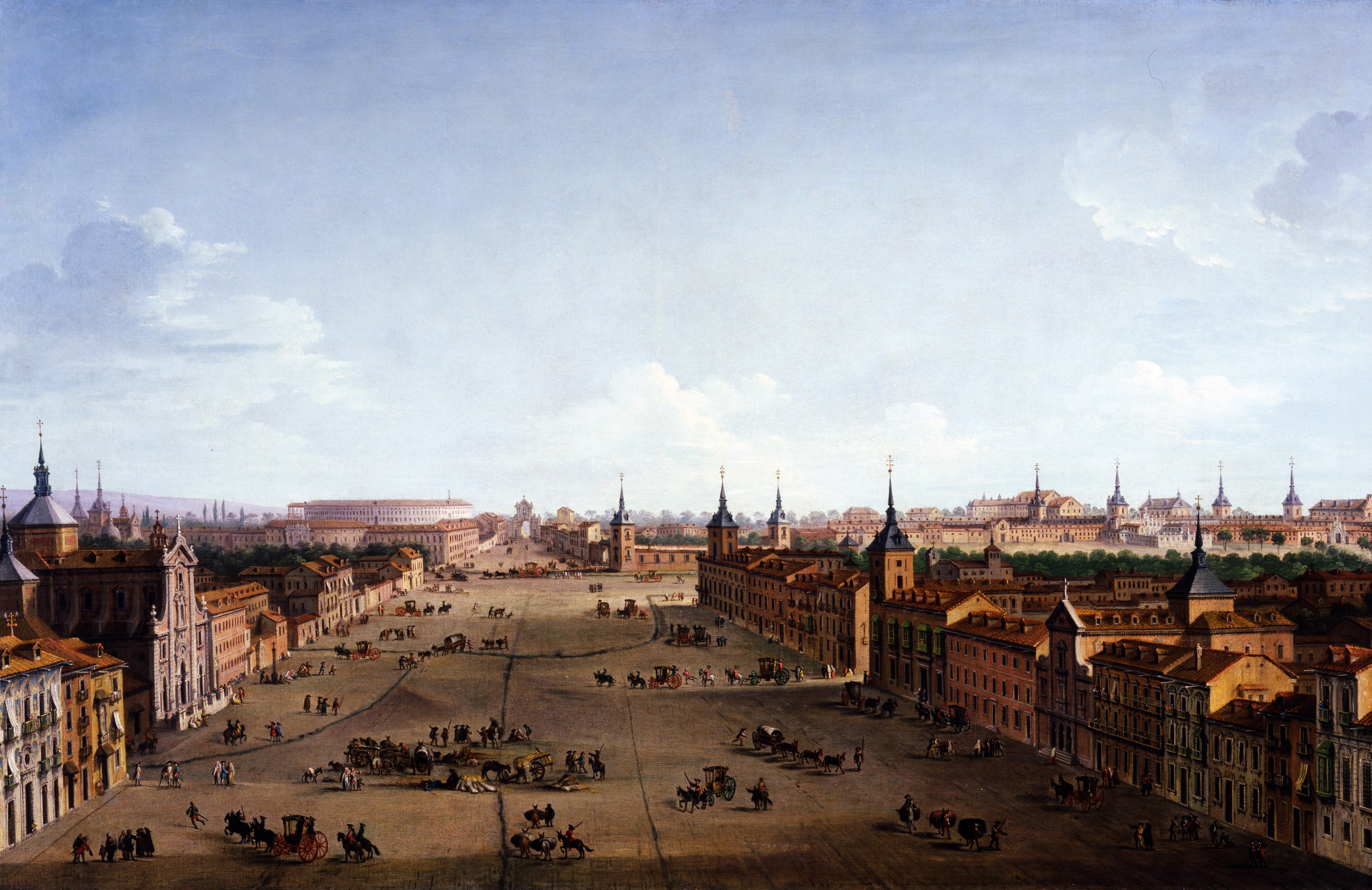
View of Calle de Alcalá, Madrid
