= Ezekiel Goldthwait =

American politician

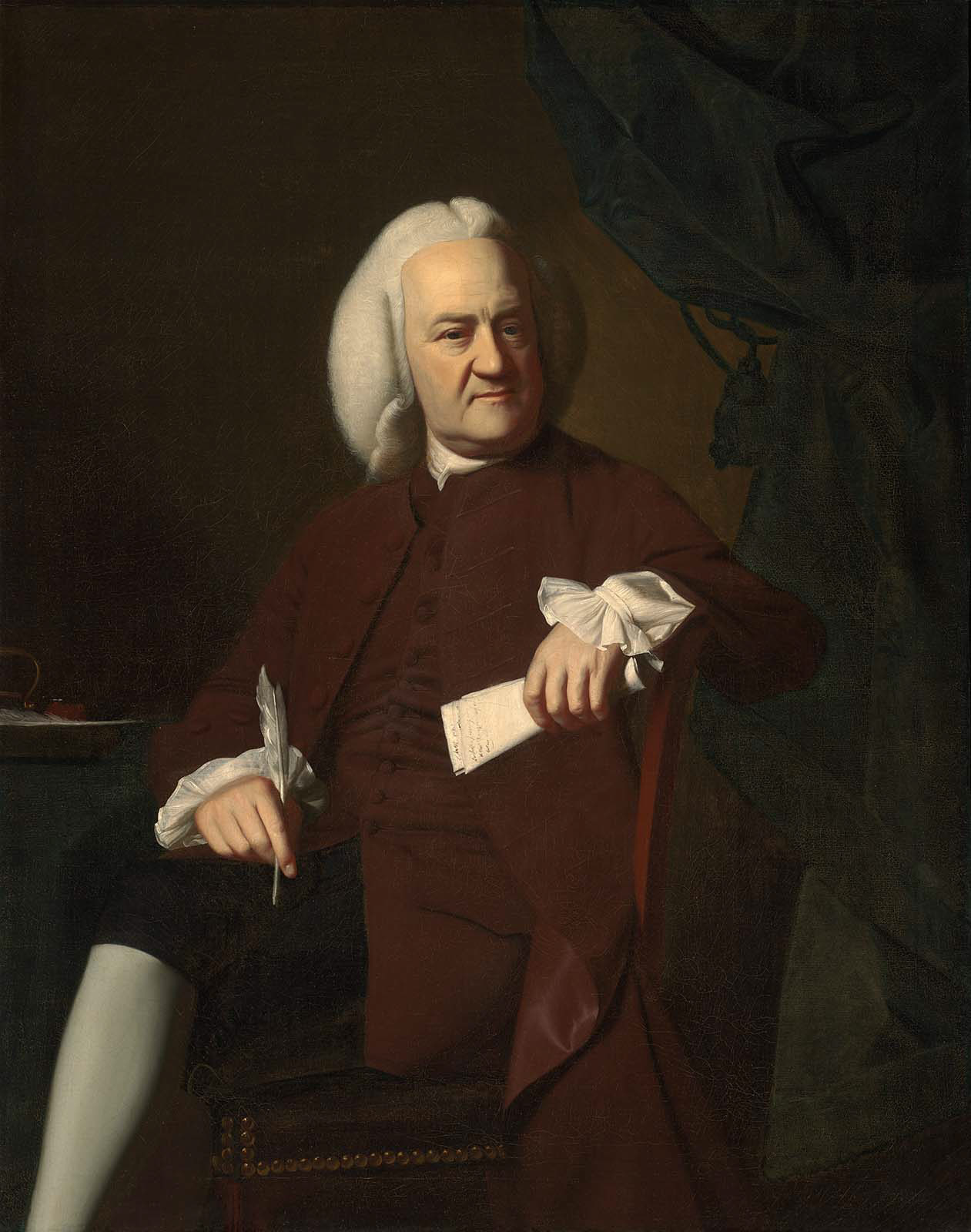
- Goldthwait by John Copley, 1771
- Born: July 19, 1710; Boston, Massachusetts, Great Britain
- Died: November 27, 1782 (aged 72); Boston, Massachusetts, United States
- Spouse: Elizabeth Lewis (m. 1732)
- Children: 13

Ezekiel Goldthwait (July 19, 1710 – November 27, 1782) was an American merchant and landowner. Born in Boston, the capital of the Province of Massachusetts Bay, he rose to become one of the city's leading citizens in the years leading to the American Revolution (1765–1783).

== Biography ==
Ezekiel Goldthwait was born in the North End of Boston on July 19, 1710, and was baptized at the Second Church on July 23. A member of a merchant family originally from Salem, Massachusetts, Goldthwait was quite prosperous. He lived on Hanover Street in a "Mansion House". He also owned houses on State and Ann streets, a country estate in Roxbury, Massachusetts, a chaise, considerable china, silver, glassware and furniture, over 30 paintings/drawings, several hundred books and pamphlets, and a gold watch.

He married Elizabeth Lewis on November 2, 1732, and they had thirteen children.

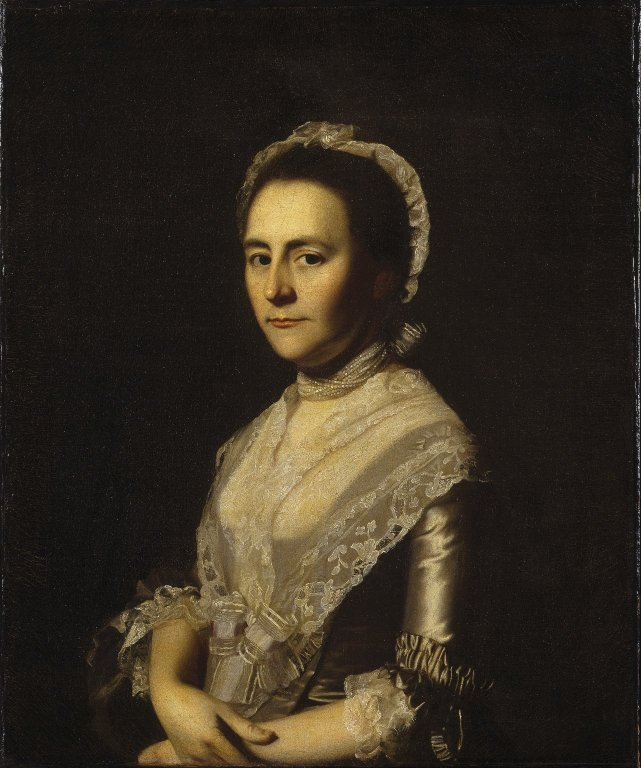
Ezekiel's daughter 'Elizabeth Goldthwaite, later 'Mrs. Alexander Cumming, and then Mrs. John Bacon'' (ca 1770)

Goldthwait held a number of positions of trust. He served as executor of the wills of numerous prominent Massachusetts citizens of the time, including Governor William Dummer. He served on a committee relating to the British occupation of Boston, as well as many other colonial committees, and was appointed to meet with the governor on business for the town of Boston. He served as Town Clerk of Boston for 20 years. He was Clerk of the Court of Common Pleas and Clerk of the Court of General Sessions of the Peace, and was Register of Deeds for Suffolk County for 30 years. At various times he also held the posts of Selectman, Town Auditor, and Town Meeting Moderator. In 1771, he was challenged by Samuel Adams for the position of Register of Deeds, but beat Adams in the election by a margin of over two-to-one.

In 1769, John Adams and Goldthwait were on good terms. Adams recorded in his diary that Goldthwait had invited Adams "to a genteel dinner of fish, bacon, peas, and incomparable Madeira under the shady trees (at Flax Pond) with half a dozen as clever fellows as ever were born." However, after Goldthwait defeated Adams's cousin, Samuel Adams, in the election of 1771, John Adams' diary entries regarding Goldthwait were quite uncomplimentary. Part of this may have been personal, but part of it may simply be a reflection of the hardening of divisions in political opinion in the years leading up to the American Revolution.

Goldthwait's views were generally those of a Loyalist, feeling that despite the grievances of the colonists, a break with Britain would be a mistake. After the Battle of Lexington and Concord started the Revolutionary War, the Massachusetts militia laid siege to Boston, trapping the British Army and the citizens of the city inside. When the Royal Navy evacuated the British Army 11 months later, it took thousands of Loyalists with it to Halifax, Nova Scotia. Goldthwait, though, decided to stay in Boston. However, he was not condemned as a Loyalist, and his valuable properties in Boston and country estate in Roxbury, Massachusetts were not seized by the revolutionary government.

== Start of the Revolutionary War ==
Goldthwait definitely had Loyalist feelings by 1774. He was one of the "Addressors" of Governor Thomas Hutchinson when Hutchinson was recalled to England (and had essentially been driven out of Massachusetts by the Sons of Liberty). Goldthwait and other influential Bostonians wrote a letter to Hutchinson, thanking him for his service as governor and wishing him well.

However, a decade and a half before, Goldthwait and a group of other businessmen had been appalled at the writs of assistance that the crown had started issuing to clamp down on colonial smuggling. Writs of assistance were essentially search warrants without any limits. They authorized customs officials to go anywhere, at any time. They required local sheriffs, and even local citizens, to assist in breaking into colonists' houses or lend whatever assistance customs officials desired.

In 1761, Goldthwait and a group of other outraged Boston businessmen engaged lawyer James Otis, Jr. to challenge the writs of assistance in court. Otis gave the speech of his life, making references to Magna Carta, classical allusions, natural law, and the colonists' "rights as Englishmen".

The court ruled against Goldthwait and the other merchants. However, the case lit the fire that became the American Revolution. Otis's arguments were published in the colonies, and stirred widespread support for colonial rights. A young lawyer, John Adams, was in the packed courtroom, and was moved by Otis' performance and legal arguments. Adams later said that "Then and there the child Independence was born."

== Later life and death ==
After the Revolution, Goldthwait took no further part in public affairs. He died in Boston on November 27, 1782.
