= John Heaviside Clark =

Scottish engraver and painter

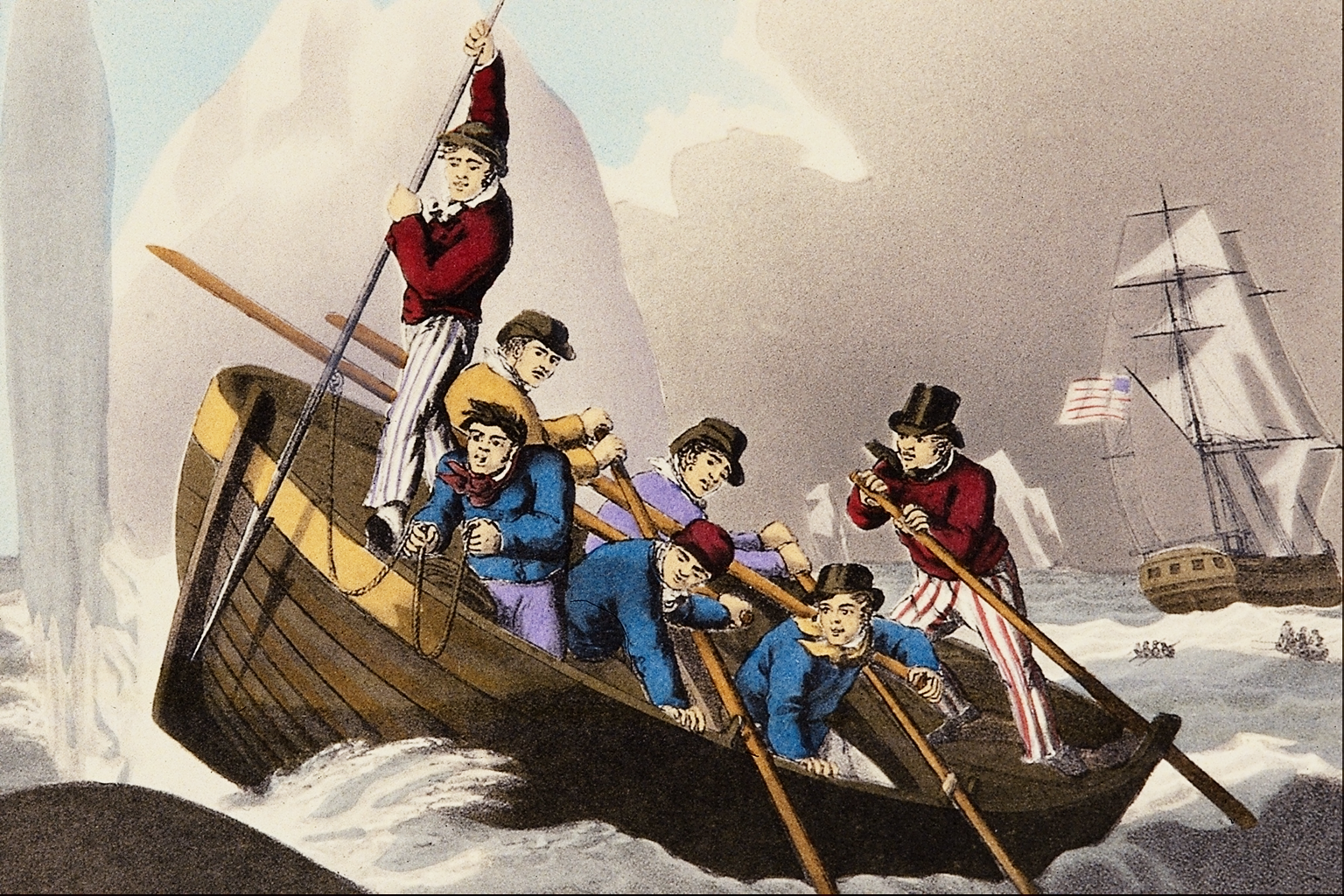
A ship's boat attacking a whale, hand-colored engraving from 1813

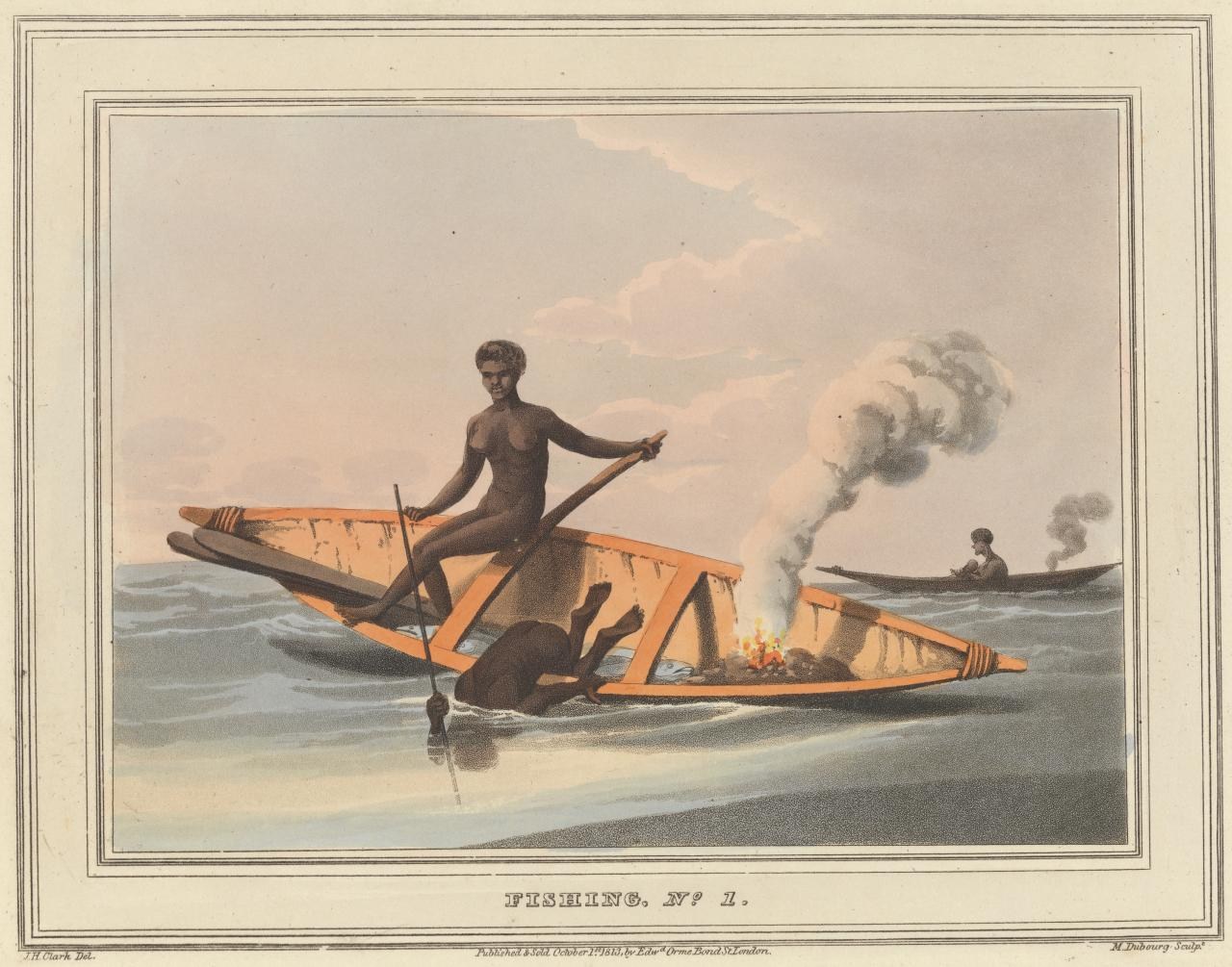
Fishing No. 1, drawing by Clark engraved in aquatint by Matthew Dubourg, 1813

John Heaviside Clark (c.1771–1863) was an English aquatint engraver and painter of seascapes and landscapes. He was christened at St. Peter's church, Sudbury, Suffolk on 5 August 1770, the son of William and Ann Clark. He married Stuart Seddon Elston at St. George's Hanover Square on 22 May 1797 where he described himself as a bookbinder in the register. They had three children, Harriet Seddon (1800–1885), Charles (1800) and Emma Stuart (1818). Clark was known as Waterloo Clark, because of the sketches he made on the field directly after the Battle of Waterloo. He visited Scotland in the summer of 1823, if not before, and published Views in Scotland (in parts in 1824–25, under the patronage of George IV). He moved to Edinburgh around 1830 and remained there until his death. There is a very rare watercolour view of Whithorn in the Whithorn Museum signed J. Clark and dated 1825. It was presented to HM Office of Works by James Henry Lockhart of Pittsburgh (1863–1938). He was the son of Charles Lockhart (1818–1905), born at Cairnhead near Whithorn, who trained as a grocer in Garlieston before leaving for the United States in 1836. There he made his fortune as an oil man, establishing the Standard Oil Company with John D. Rockefeller in 1874.

Clark exhibited regularly at the Royal Academy between 1801 and 1832. He was the author of A practical essay on the art of Colouring and Painting Landscapes, with illustrations, published in 1807, and A practical Illustration of Gilpin's Day, with thirty colour plates, based on monochrome studies representing different times of day by William Gilpin, in 1824. A large group of his aquatints can be seen on the British Government Art Collection website.

He died in Edinburgh in 1863 aged 91 and an obituary was published in The Atheneum magazine, 10 October 1863.
