= Dominicus van Tol =

Dutch painter

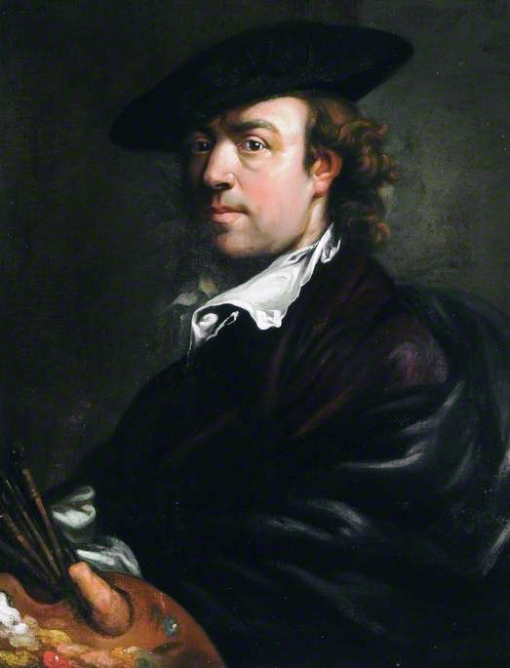
Self portrait

Dominicus van Tol (also known as Domenicus van Tol) (c.1635–1676) was a Dutch Golden Age painter.

== Biography ==
Van Tol was born in Bodegraven. He was a nephew of Gerard Dou and his works often draw comparison with those of his uncle. In 1664, he became a member of the Leiden Guild of St. Luke and in 1670 he got married and moved to Utrecht. A daughter was baptised in Amsterdam in 1674, and in 1675 he was back in Leiden, where he became a member of the guild again, and eventually died. He is known for being a fijnschilder.
