= Krzysztof Perwanger =

Polish sculptor and mayor

Krzysztof Perwanger (1700–1785) was a Polish sculptor and mayor.

Perwanger came to Tolkmicko about 1735. There he became a brewer, and in 1746 he was a senior member of the local beer guild. In 1758 he became the mayor of Tolkmicko. He lived in Tolkmicko until 1761. After briefly living in Königsberg, at the end of his life he settled permanently in Reszel. Perwanger was married twice. Since 1741 he was married to Feldkeller Elizabeth. After her death in 1759, he married Dorothy Meschele. He had a son John Christopher with his first wife.

Perwanger's sculptural techniques were influenced by the workshop of Antoniego Kornowskiego in Tolkmicko. He pioneered Rococo in Warmia. His works have been executed in plaster, marble, sandstone, wood and ivory. Perwanger's workshop produced figural sculptures and woodcarving works in the pulpit, confessionals and decorations for local churches.
