= Ricardo do Pilar =

Brazilian monk and painter

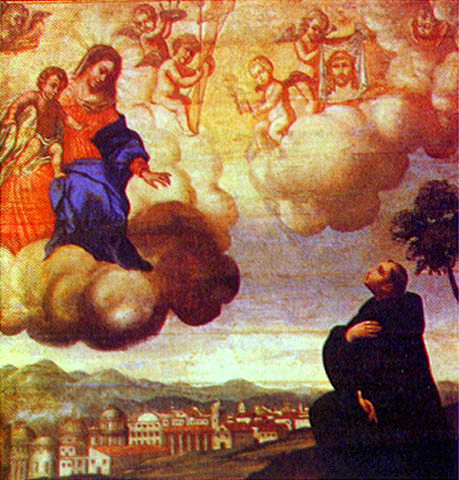
Apparition of Our Lady to St. Bernard by Ricardo do Pilar, Monastery of St. Benedict, Rio de Janeiro, 1680

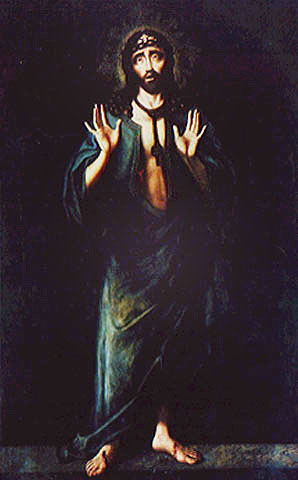
Man of Sorrows, Monastery of St. Benedict, 1690

Ricardo do Pilar (1635 – 12 February 1700) was a German-born Brazilian monk and painter.

Ricardo was born in Cologne where he studied art, then moved to Brazil around 1660. There he worked as a painter for the Monastery of St. Benedict in Rio de Janeiro. In 1670 he joined the monastery as a secular brother. Brother Ricardo officially joined the Order of Saint Benedict in 1695. He primarily painted portraits of saints and monks living at the monastery. He died in Rio de Janeiro on 12 February 1700.
