= Giovanni Giacomo Borni =

Italian painter (1635–1700)

Giovanni Giacomo Borni (1635 – 29 October 1700) was an Italian painter of the Baroque period, active in the Republic of Venice in towns near the province of Brescia, including Saviore dell'Adamello. He is also referred in local documents as Gian Giacomo Gaioni or Gajoni detto il Bate or Bornibatte. Also known as Giacomo Borno. He was born in Ponte, now a frazione of Saviore dell'Adamello, to Tomaso Bornini. His early mentors are unknown. He married Margherita Gelmini from Ponte in 1659 and had about a half dozen children. He died in Ponte.

Local painting styles that may have influenced him include Jacopo da Palma il Giovane, Giuseppe Nuvolone (son of Panfilo), Grazio Cossali, Girolamo Romanino, Girolamo Savoldo, and il Moretto.
