= Pedro Nuñez de Villavicencio =

Spanish painter

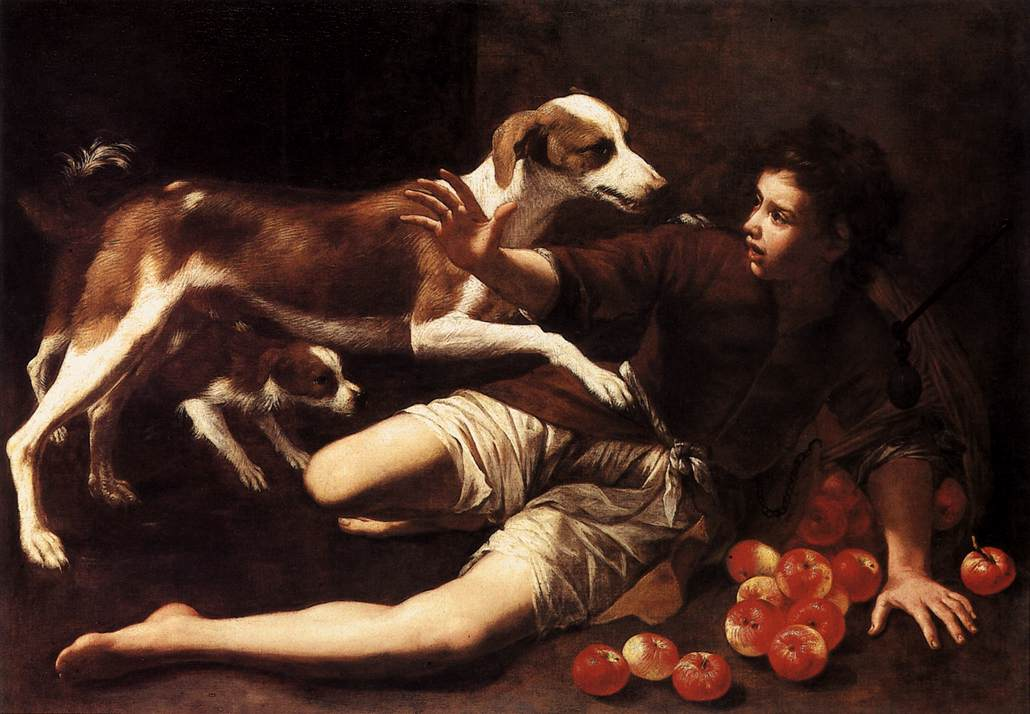
Pedro Nuñez de Villavicencio, Boy Attacked by a Dog, ca. 1680, Museum of Fine Arts, Budapest

Pedro Nuñez de Villavicencio (1635–1700) was a Spanish Baroque painter. He was born in Seville in 1635. He was trained by Murillo. He was named a knight of the order of San Juan. As a knight of the order, he performed duties in Malta, where he met Mattia Preti. When he returned to Spain, along with Murillo, he helped establish the Academia de Seville. When Murillo died, he traveled to Madrid. He died in Seville in 1700.

== Works ==
His paintings included:

- Niño espulgando a un perro (c. 1650), the Hermitage, Saint Petersburg
- Saint Anne, the Virgin and Child (Santa Ana, la Virgen y el Niño), framed and completed in 1677, Museo de Bellas Artes de Valencia.
- Boy Attacked by a Dog (c. 1680), Museum of Fine Arts, Budapest
- Juegos infantiles (Children's Games) (1686), the Prado, Madrid
- Joven pastor con vacas (A Young Pastor with Cows), Ferens Art Gallery, Hull
- Fallen Apple Basket
