= Felice Polanzani =

Italian painter

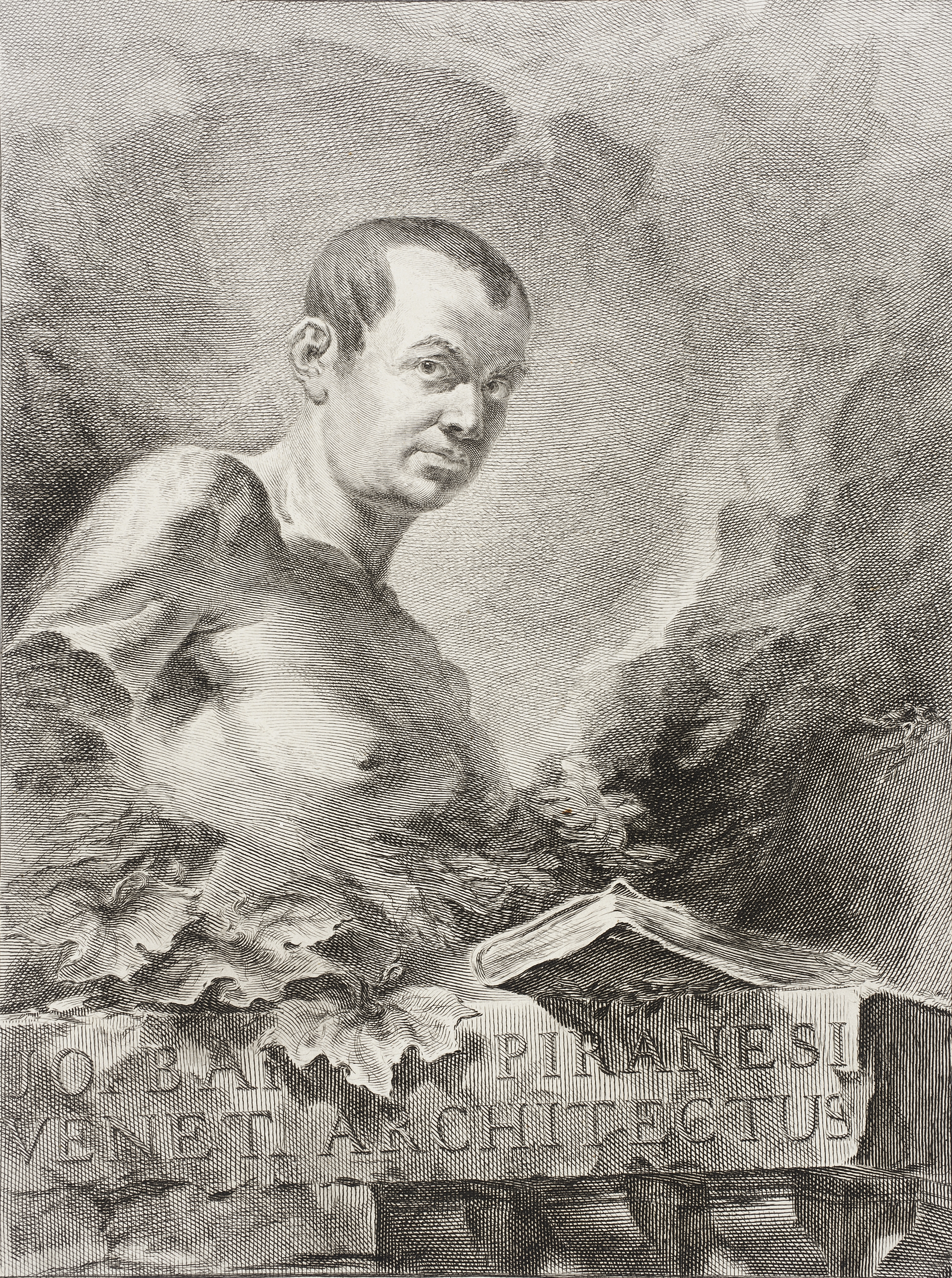
Giovanni Battista Piranesi by Felice Polanzani, engraving from first edition, ’b’; Book: Opere varie, Frontispiece, 1750

Felice Polanzani (or Polanzi) (c. 1700 - after 1771) was an Italian engraver.

Polanzani was born at Noale, near Venice, but worked mainly in Rome, where he engraved a set of twenty-two plates, representing the Life of the Virgin based on designs some attributed to Nicolas Poussin, others to Jacobo Stella. He also engraved works of Van Dyck, Carlo Cignani, Marco Benefial, and G. Noyan.
