= 1624 in art =

List of years in art	(table)
- … 1614; 1615; 1616; 1617; 1618; 1619; 1620; 1621; 1622; 1623; 1624; 1625; 1626; 1627; 1628; 1629; 1630; 1631; 1632; 1633; 1634 …
- Art; Archaeology; Architecture; Literature; Music; Philosophy; Science; +...

Events from the year 1624 in art.

== Events ==
- Anna Visscher marries Dominicus Booth van Wesel.
- Caravaggio's painting of Supper at Emmaus is recorded as being in the collection of Marchese Patrizi.
- Flemish painter Anthony van Dyck, trapped in the Sicilian city of Palermo during the 1624–1625 plague and quarantine there, produces five paintings of the city's patron Saint Rosalia, Saint Rosalia (Madrid), Saint Rosalia Crowned by Angels (Houston), Saint Rosalia Crowned by Angels (London), Saint Rosalie Interceding for the Plague–Stricken of Palermo (New York) and Saint Rosalia Crowned by Angels (Palermo), influential in the iconography of the subject.

== Paintings ==
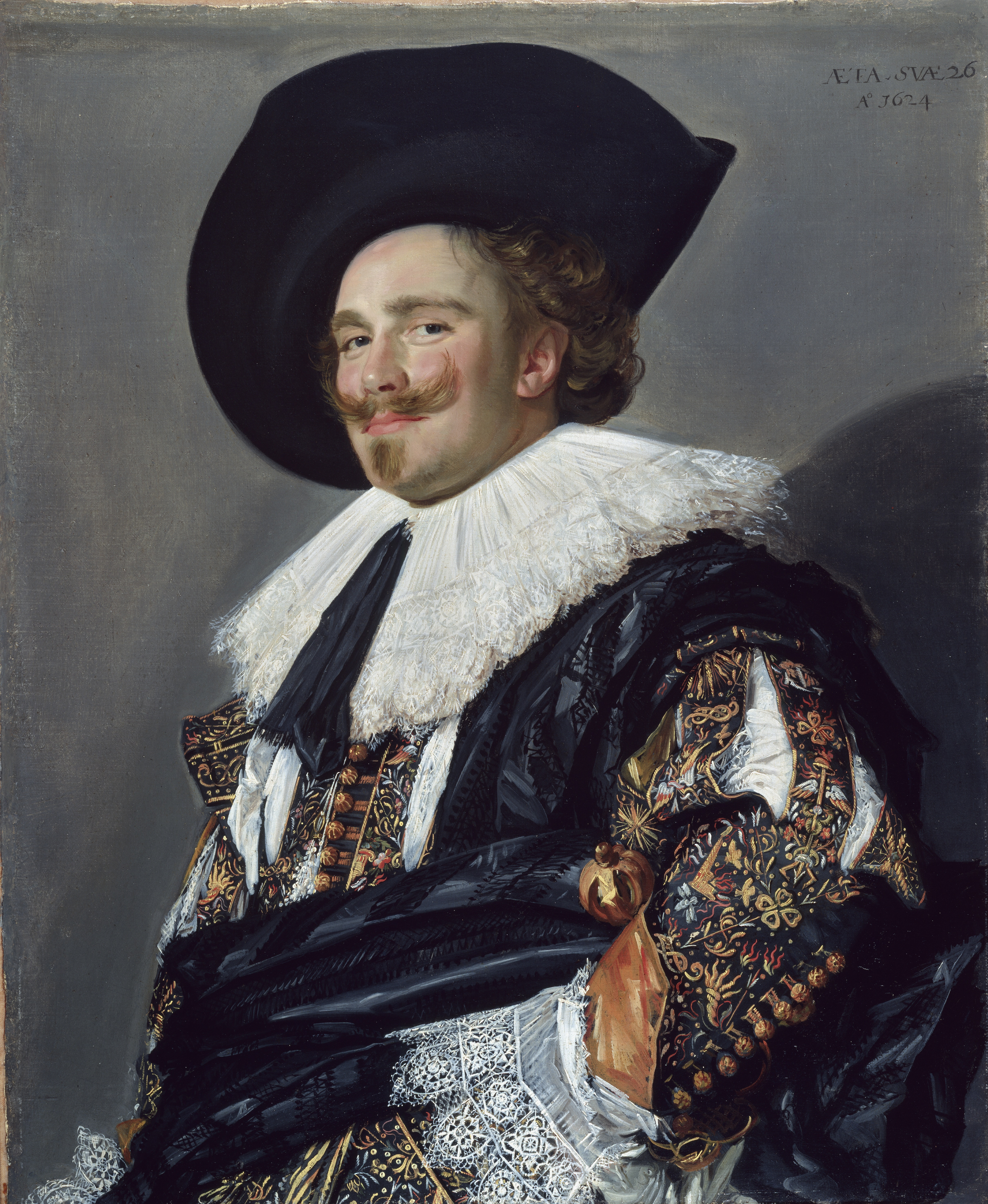
Hals - Laughing Cavalier

- Frans Hals - Laughing Cavalier (Wallace Collection, London)
- Diego Velázquez - Portrait of the Count-Duke of Olivares (Museu de Arte de São Paulo)

== Births ==
- January 15 - Rombout Verhulst, sculptor from Brabant (died 1698)
- February 11 - Lambert Doomer, Dutch painter (died 1700)
- November - Barent Fabritius, Dutch painter (died 1673)
- date unknown
  - Benito Manuel Agüero, Spanish painter of the Baroque period (died 1668)
  - Valerio Castello, Italian painter (died 1659)
  - Antonio Giusti, Italian painter, active mainly in Florence (died 1705)
  - Bernhard Keil, Danish painter (died 1687)
  - Jan Peeters I, Flemish seascape painter (died 1677)
  - Antonio Raggi, Italian sculptor (died 1686)
  - Pedro Roldán, Spanish sculptor (died 1699)
  - Orazio Talami, Italian painter, active mainly in Bologna (died 1705)
  - Zhou Shuxi, female Chinese painter in Qing Dynasty (died 1705)
- probable
  - Lazzaro Baldi, Italian painter, active mainly in Rome (died 1703)
  - Gaspard Marsy, French sculptor (died 1681)

== Deaths ==
- February 12 - George Heriot, Scottish goldsmith, jeweler, and philanthropist (born 1563)
- February 21 – Dirck van Baburen, Dutch painter (born 1595)
- June 4 - Rombertus van Uylenburgh, Dutch lawyer, father-in-law of Rembrandt (born 1554)
- September 23 – Willem Pieterszoon Buytewech, Dutch painter (born 1591/1592)
- November 2 (buried) - Cornelis van der Voort, Dutch portrait painter (born 1576)
- date unknown
  - Seyyid Kasim Gubari, Ottoman calligrapher who worked on the Sultan Ahmed Mosque (born unknown)
  - Esther Inglis, Scottish miniaturist, embroiderer, calligrapher, translator and writer (born 1571)
  - Luis Tristán, Spanish painter (born 1586)
  - Abraham van Blijenberch, Flemish painter (born 1575)
  - Jacob van der Laemen, Flemish painter (born 1584)
  - Francesco Villamena, Italian engraver (born 1566)
