= 1629 in art =

List of years in art	(table)
- … 1619; 1620; 1621; 1622; 1623; 1624; 1625; 1626; 1627; 1628; 1629; 1630; 1631; 1632; 1633; 1634; 1635; 1636; 1637; 1638; 1639 …
- Art; Archaeology; Architecture; Literature; Music; Philosophy; Science; +...

Events from the year 1629 in art.

== Events ==
- Pope Urban VIII asks Bernini to sketch possible renovations to the Trevi Fountain

== Paintings ==
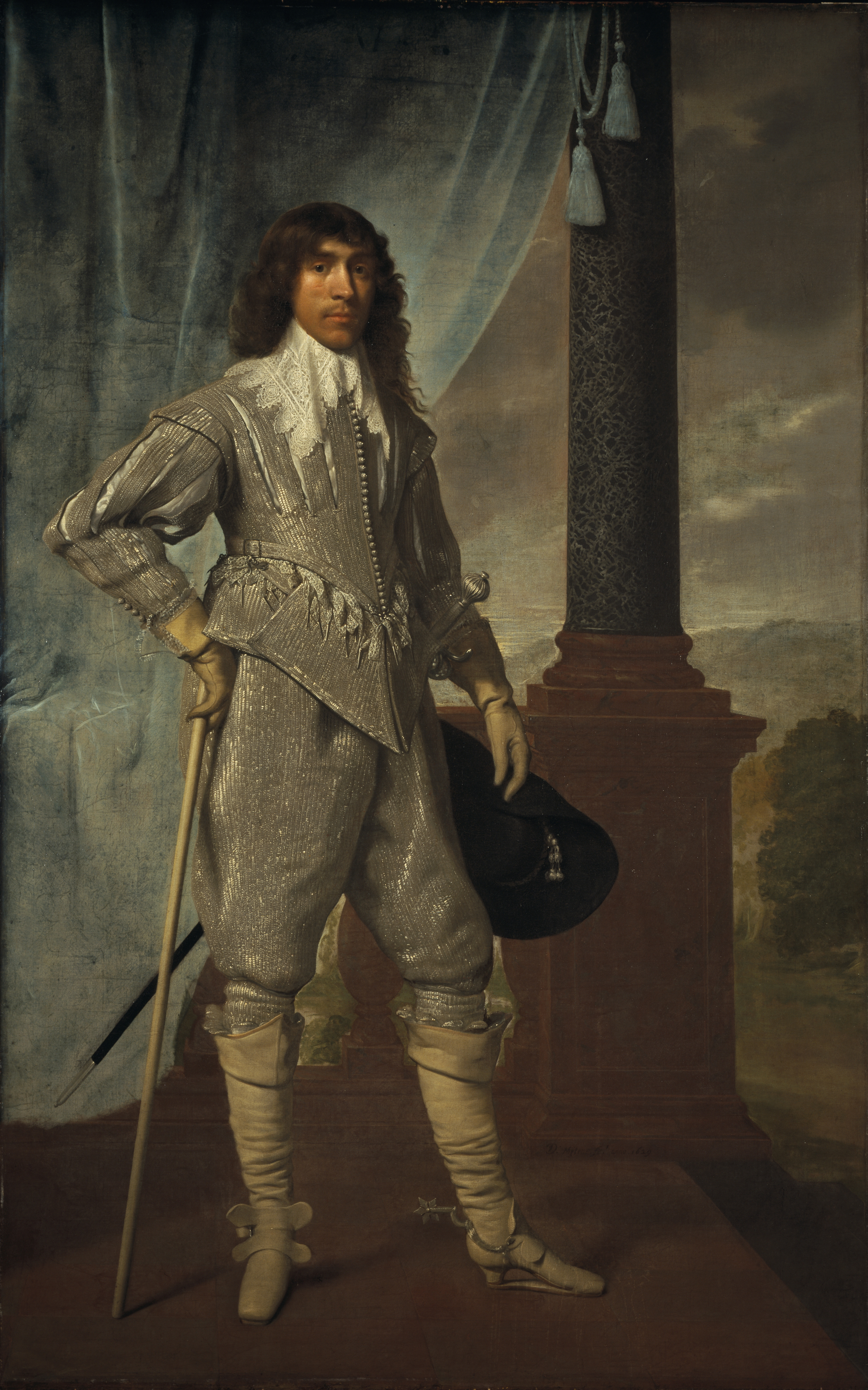
Mijtens' portrait of the Marquess of Hamilton

- Marcus Gheeraerts the Younger - Anne Hale, Mrs Hoskins
- Dirck Hals - Merry Company at Table (1627–29)
- Judith Leyster - Serenade
- Daniël Mijtens - James Hamilton, Marquess of Hamilton (adult portrait)
- Jan Porcellis - Vessels in a Moderate Breeze
- Nicolas Poussin - The Martyrdom of Saint Erasmus
- Rembrandt
  - Judas Repentant, Returning the Pieces of Silver
  - Self-portrait
- Guido Reni - Annunciation
- Sir Anthony Van Dyck - Rinaldo and Armida
- Velázquez - Los Borrachos
- Francisco de Zurbarán - Vision of Saint Peter Nolasco

== Births ==
- January - Gabriël Metsu, Dutch painter (died 1667)
- September 4 - Lorenzo Pasinelli, Italian painter in a Mannerism style of genre-like allegories (died 1700)
- December - Pieter de Hooch, Dutch painter (died 1684)
- date unknown
  - Antonio Vela Cobo, Spanish Baroque painter, sculptor and gilder (died 1675)
  - Pierre Le Gros the Elder, French sculptor for the Versailles (died 1714)
  - Giovanni Peruzzini, Italian painter of lunettes and religious themed works (died 1694)
  - Giovan Battista Ruoppolo, Neapolitan painter, notable for still-lifes (died 1693)

== Deaths ==
- March 29 - Jacob de Gheyn II, Dutch painter and engraver (born 1565)
- May 6 - Otto van Veen, painter, draughtsman, and humanist (born 1556)
- August 21 – Camillo Procaccini, Italian painter, in 1571 a student in the Bolognese painters' guild (born 1551)
- August 29 - Pietro Bernini, Italian sculptor and father of the more famous Gianlorenzo Bernini (born 1562)
- November - Filippo Napoletano, Italian artist of diverse paintings of exotic soldiers, skeletons of animals, or cityscapes (born 1587)
- November 1 - Hendrick ter Brugghen, Dutch painter, and a leading member of the Dutch followers of Caravaggio (born 1588)
- December 4 - Grazio Cossali, Italian painter (born 1563)
- date unknown
  - Abdón Castañeda, Spanish Baroque painter (born 1580)
  - Bartolomeo Cesi, Italian painter of the Bolognese School (born 1556)
  - Carlo Maderno, Italian sculptor (born 1556)
  - Aegidius Sadeler II, Flemish engraver of the Sadeler family (born 1570)
  - Jacob van Doordt, Dutch portrait miniature painter (born unknown)
  - Antonio Vassilacchi, Greek painter active in Venice (born 1556)
