= 1630 in art =

Events from the year 1630 in art.

== Events ==
- unknown date – The gardens of Sentō Imperial Palace, Kyoto, are designed by Kobori Masakazu and laid out by Kentei.

== Paintings ==
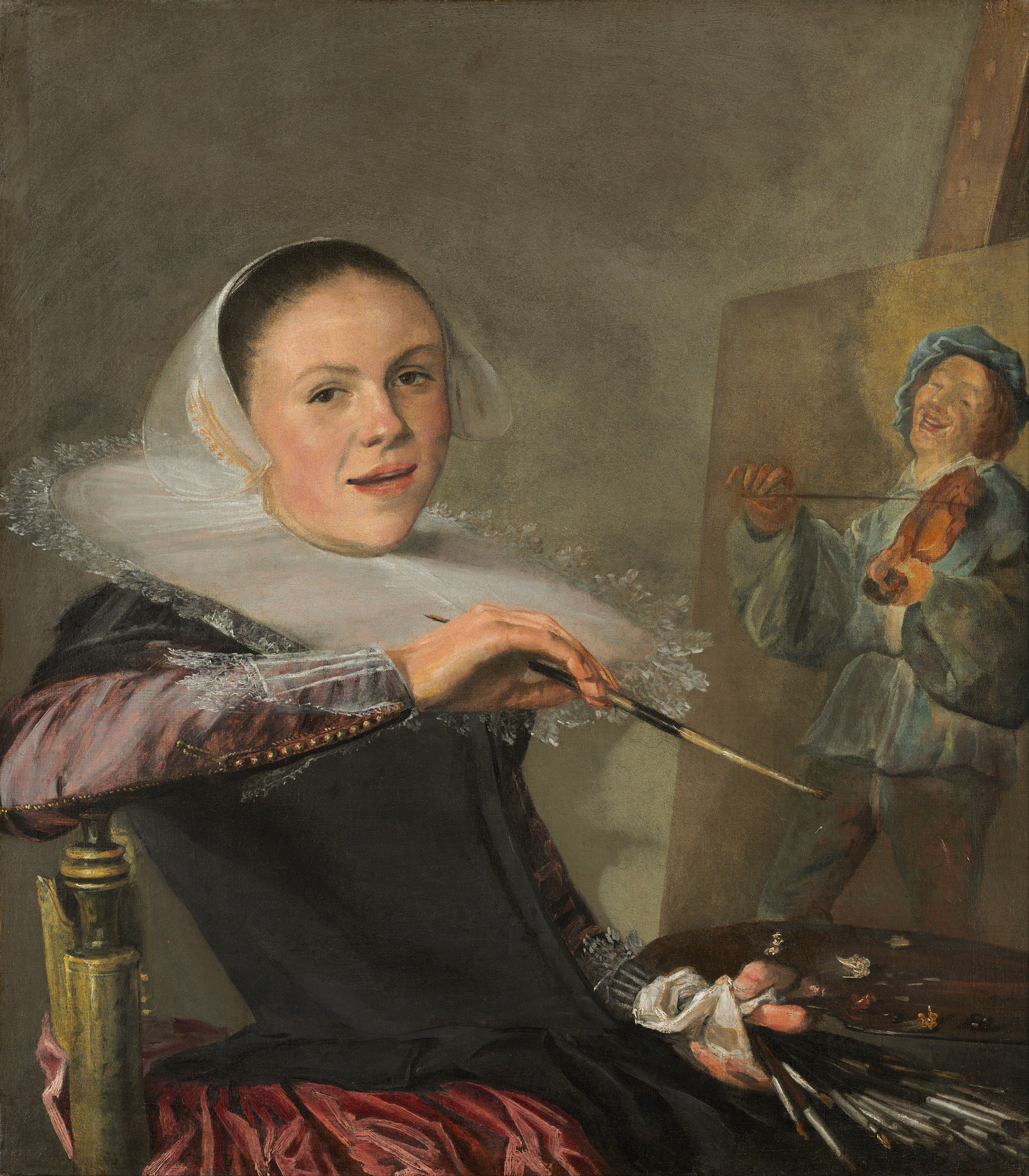
Self-portrait by Judith Leyster

- Reza Abbasi – Two Lovers
- Pieter Claesz – Vanitas Still Life
- Georges de La Tour – The Fortune Teller
- Judith Leyster
  - A Game of Tric Trac
  - The Happy Couple
  - Self-portrait
- Rembrandt – paintings using chiaroscuro
  - Jeremiah Lamenting the Destruction of Jerusalem
  - The Raising of Lazarus
- Anthony van Dyck – The Vision of the Blessed Hermann Joseph
- Diego Velázquez – Apollo in the Forge of Vulcan
- Francisco de Zurbarán – Death of Saint Bonaventura

== Births ==
- January 27 – Job Adriaenszoon Berckheyde, Dutch artist (died 1698)
- April 16 – Lambert van Haven, Danish painter, architect and master builder (died 1695)
- August 20 – Maria van Oosterwijck, Dutch painter, specializing in richly detailed still-lifes (died 1693)
- November 12 – Catherine Duchemin, French flower and fruit painter (died 1698)
- September 27 – Michael Willmann, German painter (died 1706)
- December 28 – Ludolf Bakhuysen, Dutch painter (died 1708)
- date unknown
  - Caius Gabriel Cibber, Danish sculptor (died 1700)
  - Geronimo de Bobadilla, Spanish painter (died 1709)
  - Josefa de Óbidos, Spanish-born, Portuguese painter (died 1684)
  - Pietro Lucatelli, Italian painter active in Rome (died after 1690)
  - Stefano Erardi, Maltese painter (died 1716)
  - Jean Baptiste Mathey, French architect and painter (died 1696)
  - Francisco Meneses Osorio, Spanish painter (died 1705)
  - Filippo Parodi, sculptor (died 1702)
  - Jan Vermeer van Utrecht, Dutch Golden Age painter (died 1696)
- probable
  - Pietro Aquila, Italian painter and printmaker (died 1692)
  - Matias de Arteaga, Spanish painter and engraver (died 1704)
  - Hendrick Bogaert, Dutch painter (died 1675)
  - Orazio Bruni, Italian engraver (died unknown)
  - Cornelis Norbertus Gysbrechts, Flemish painter of still life and trompe-l'œil (died 1683)
  - Juan Valdelmira de Leon, Spanish of primarily still-life paintings of fruit and flowers (died 1660)
  - 1630s: Bogdan Saltanov, Armenian-born Russian painter (died 1703)
  - 1630/1631: Henry Gibbs, English oil painter (died 1713)

== Deaths ==
- July 13 - Matteo Zaccolini, Italian painter, priest and author (born 1574)
- July 19 - Daniele Crespi, Italian painter and colorist (born 1590)
- August 5 - Antonio Tempesta, Florentine painter and engraver, worked in Rome, influenced by counter-Mannerism (born 1555)
- November - Esaias van de Velde, Dutch landscape painter (born 1587)
- date unknown
  - Marco Antonio Bassetti, Italian painter (born 1588)
  - Ottavio Leoni, Italian painter and printmaker (born 1578)
  - Alessandro Maganza, Italian Mannerist painter (born 1556)
  - Pasquale Ottini, Italian painter active mainly in Verona (born 1570)
  - Jerónimo Rodriguez de Espinosa, Spanish painter (born 1562)
  - victims of the Italian plague of 1629–1631
    - Giovanni Bernardo Carlone, Italian painter of the late-Mannerist and early-Baroque periods (born 1590)
    - Fede Galizia, Italian still life painter (born 1578)
- probable
  - Giulio Cesare Angeli, Italian painter (born 1570)
  - Jacob Hoefnagel, Flemish naturalist and artist (born 1573)
  - Đorđe Mitrofanović, Serbian portraitist, icon painter and muralist (born 1550).
