= 1705 in art =

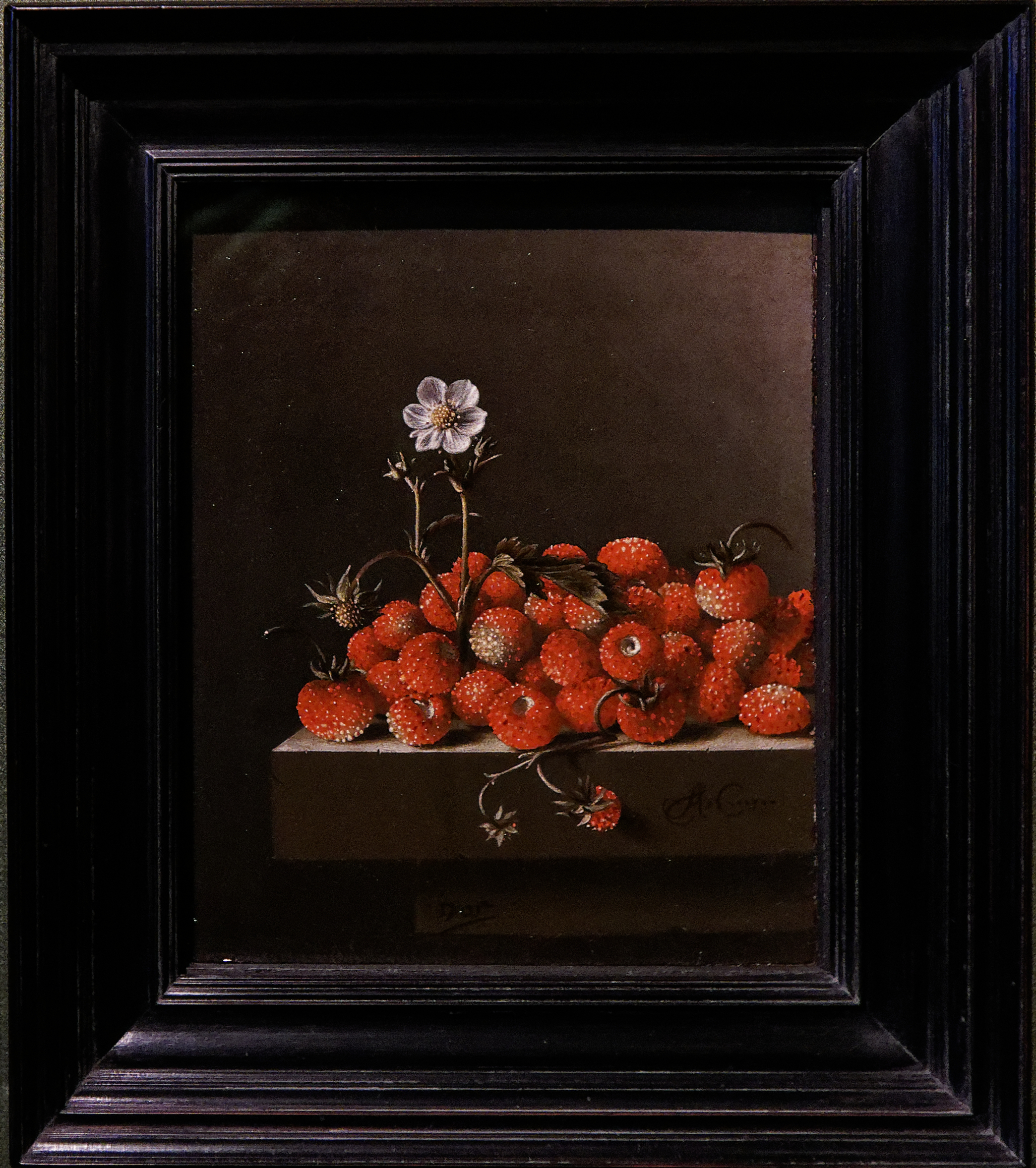
Adriaen Coorte, Still Life with Wild Strawberries

Events from the year 1705 in art.

== Events ==
- The Venetian painter Rosalba Carriera becomes the first woman elected to the Accademia di San Luca in Rome.

== Paintings ==
- Federiko Benković – Juno on the Clouds
- Michael Dahl – Queen Anne
- Sebastiano Ricci
  - The Battle of the Lapiths and the Centaurs
  - The Vision of St. Bruno

== Births ==
- February 15 – Charles-André van Loo, French subject painter (died 1765), and a younger brother of Jean-Baptiste van Loo
- June 1 – Carl Marcus Tuscher, German-born Danish polymath, portrait painter, printmaker, architect, and decorator (died 1751)
- August 18 – Emanuel Büchel, Swiss painter (died 1775)
- date unknown
  - Jean Barbault, French painter and engraver (died 1765/1766)
  - Andrés de la Calleja, Spanish painter (died 1785)
  - Andrea Casali, Italian painter of the Rococo period (died 1784)
  - Carlo Costanzi, Italian gem engraver of the late-Baroque period (died 1781)
  - Claude Drevet – French portrait engraver (died 1782)
  - Robert Feke, American painter (died 1750)
  - Johan Graham, painter from London active in The Hague and Amsterdam (died 1775)
  - Matthäus Günther, German painter and artist of the Baroque and Rococo era (died 1788)
  - Jakob Klukstad, Norwegian wood carver and painter (died 1773)
  - José Ramírez de Arellano, Spanish Baroque architect and sculptor (died 1770)
  - 1704/1705: Jan Jerzy Plersch, Polish sculptor of German origin (died 1774)

== Deaths ==
- January 5 – Georg Christoph Eimmart, German draughtsman and engraver (born 1638)
- January 12 – Luca Giordano, Italian late Baroque painter and printmaker in etching (born 1634)
- March 28 – Gaspard Rigaud, French painter and portraitist (born 1661)
- June 16 – Adriaen van der Cabel, Dutch painter of the Dutch school (born 1631)
- July 16 – François Lespingola, French sculptor (born 1644)
- September 15 – Orazio Talami, Italian Baroque painter (born 1624)
- date unknown
  - Zhu Da, Chinese painter of shuimohua and a calligrapher (born 1626)
  - Claude Bertin, French sculptor for the Palace of Versailles (date of birth unknown)
  - Giuseppe Diamantini, Italian painter and printmaker of the Baroque period (born 1621)
  - Antonio Giusti, Italian painter, active mainly in Florence (born 1624)
  - Andrea Miglionico, Italian painter of historical subjects (date of birth unknown)
  - Francisco Meneses Osorio, Spanish painter (born 1630)
  - Daniel Seiter, Viennese-born fresco painter of the Baroque (born 1642/1647)
  - Bada Shanren, Chinese painter of shuimohua and a calligrapher (born 1626)
  - Zhou Shuxi, female Chinese painter in Qing Dynasty (born 1624)
