= 1626 in art =

Events from the year 1626 in art.

== Events ==
- Orazio Gentileschi leaves France to work for Charles I of England, where he remains for the rest of his life.

== Works ==
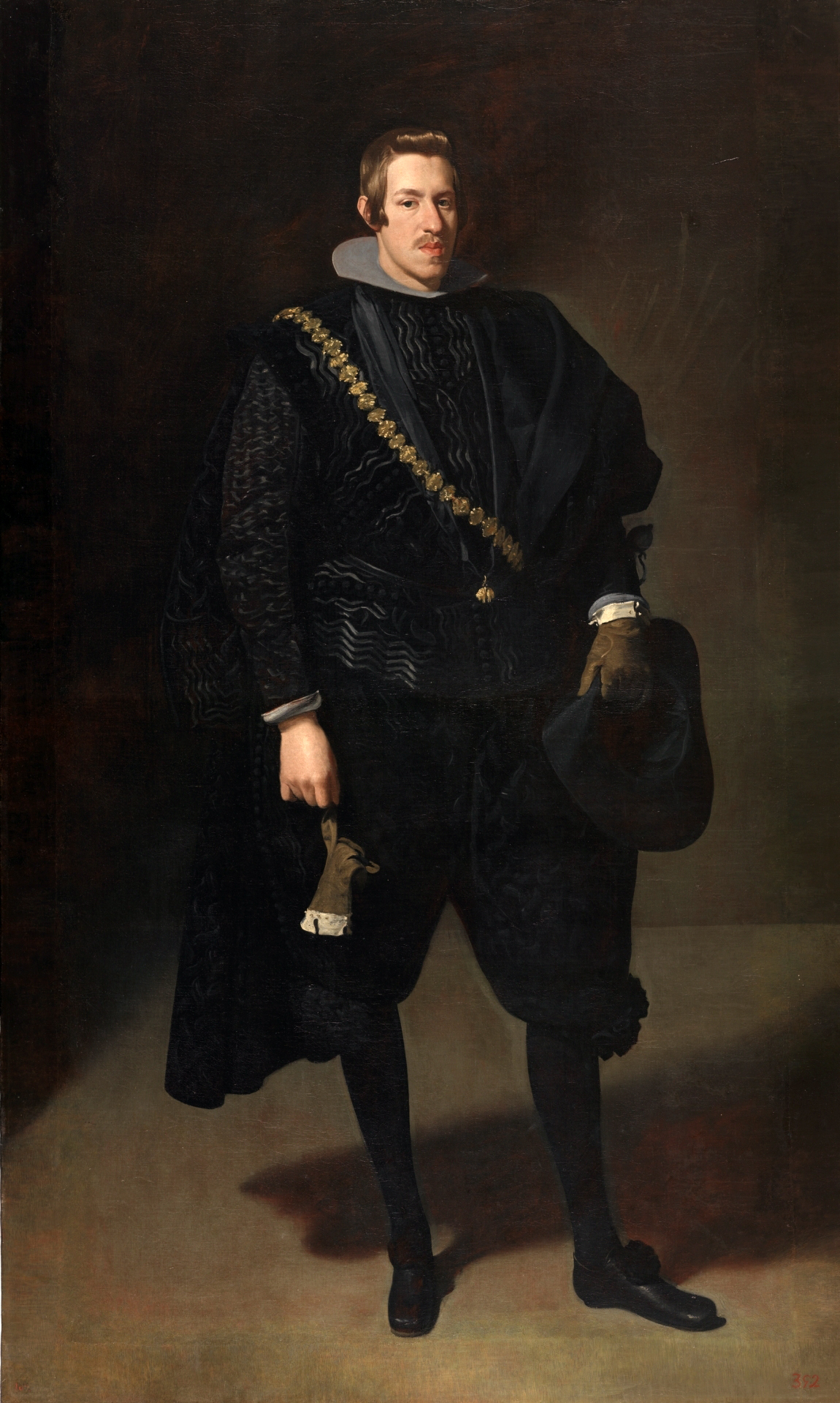
Velázquez – Portrait of the Infante Don Carlos

- Valentin de Boulogne – Musicians and Soldiers (approximate date)
- Orazio Gentileschi – The Lute Player (approximate date)
- Frans Hals – Portrait of Isaak Abrahamsz. Massa
- Michiel Jansz. van Mierevelt – George Villiers, 1st Duke of Buckingham
- Rembrandt
  - The Angel and the Prophet Balaam
  - Consul Cerialis and the Germanic Legions
  - A Musical Gathering
  - The Rest on the Flight to Egypt (etching)
  - Tobit and Anna with the Kid
- Peter Paul Rubens
  - Assumption of the Virgin Mary
  - Christ Appointing Saint Roch as Patron Saint of Plague Victims (altarpiece, completed)
- Diego Velázquez – Portrait of the Infante Don Carlos

== Births ==
- January – Lucas Achtschellinck, Flemish landscape painter (died 1699)
- September 27 – Karel Dujardin, Dutch animal and landscape painter (died 1678)
- November 30 – Cesare Pronti, Italian painter of quadratura and allegorical figures (died 1708)
- date unknown
  - Federico Agnelli, Italian engraver and printer, active in Milan (died 1702)
  - Alessandro Badiale, Italian painter and engraver (died 1671)
  - Pieter Boel, Flemish painter (died 1674)
  - Jan van de Cappelle, Dutch Golden Age painter of seascapes and winter landscapes (died 1679)
  - Andrea Carlone, Italian painter (died 1697)
  - Carlo Cesio, Italian painter active in Rome (died 1686)
  - Lorenzo Tinti, Italian painter and engraver (died 1672)
  - Simon Ushakov, Russian graphic artist (died 1686)
- probable
  - Bada Shanren (also known as Zhou Da), Chinese calligrapher and painter of shuimohua (died 1705)
  - Francis Barlow, English painter, etcher, and illustrator (died 1704)
  - Pierre Prieur, French enamel painter (died 1676)
  - Jan Steen, Dutch genre painter of the Dutch Golden Age) (died 1679)

== Deaths ==
- February 21 – Cardinal Odoardo Farnese, patron of the arts (born 1573)
- February 23 – Enea Salmeggia, Italian painter from Bergamo (born 1556)
- April – Antiveduto Grammatica, proto-Baroque Italian painter nicknamed Antiveduto ("foreseen") (born 1571)
- September 8 – Juan Sánchez Cotán, Spanish painter (born 1560)
- September 9 – Abraham Govaerts, Flemish painter of cabinet works
- date unknown
  - Agustín del Castillo, Spanish painter (born 1565)
  - Anastasio Fontebuoni, Italian painter (born 1571)
  - Pier Francesco Mazzucchelli, Italian painter of frescoes and altarpieces (born 1573)
  - Giovanni Niccolo, Italian Jesuit painter (born 1560)
  - Cristoforo Roncalli, Italian painter (born 1552)
  - Sebastian Sebastiani, Italian sculptor and founder (born unknown)
  - Adriaen de Vries, Dutch sculptor (born 1556)
- probable – Denis van Alsloot, Flemish painter (born 1570)
