= Saint Rosalia (Anthony van Dyck) =

Painting by Anthony van Dyck

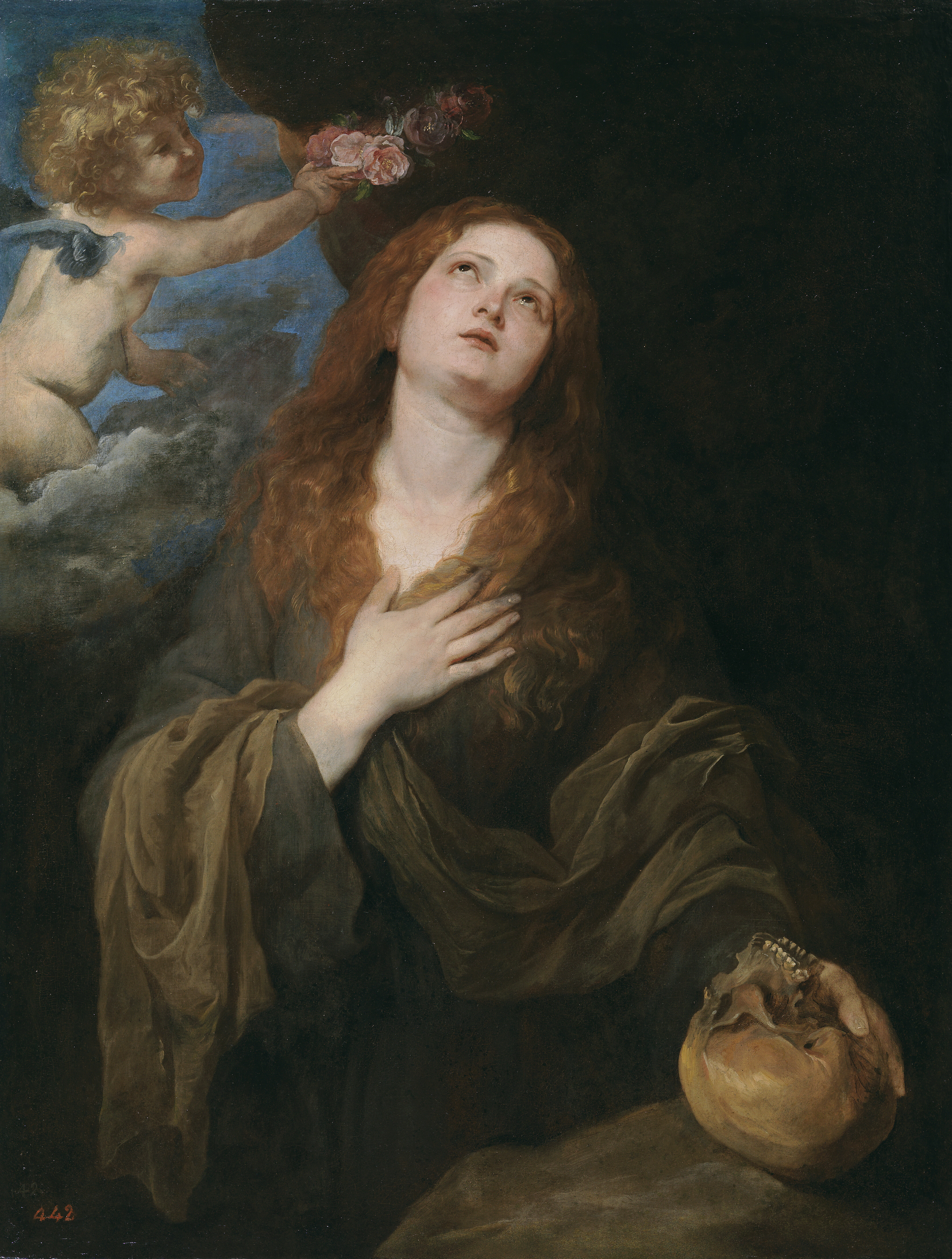
Saint Rosalia (c. 1625) by Anthony van Dyck

Saint Rosalia is a c.1625 oil on canvas painting by Anthony van Dyck. Originally owned by Giovan Francesco Serra di Cassano, it was bought by Philip IV of Spain via his Viceroy of Naples Gaspar de Bracamonte in 1664 and is now in the Museo del Prado in Madrid.

It is one of a group of surviving works showing Saint Rosalia produced by the artist in the mid-1620s whilst trapped in Palermo due to a plague, all showing the influence of Pietro Novelli, then also in the city. It uses the same composition used in three of those works (now in Palermo, London and Houston), but adds a skull in the saint's left hand and converts it from a full-length to a three-quarter-length depiction. They were all loaned to the Dulwich Picture Gallery in 2011-2012.

== See also ==
- List of paintings by Anthony van Dyck
