= 1573 in art =

List of years in art	(table)
- … 1563; 1564; 1565; 1566; 1567; 1568; 1569; 1570; 1571; 1572; 1573; 1574; 1575; 1576; 1577; 1578; 1579; 1580; 1581; 1582; 1583 …
- Art; Archaeology; Architecture; Literature; Music; Philosophy; Science; +...

Events from the year 1573 in art.

== Events ==
- July 18 - Paolo Veronese is called before the Roman Catholic Inquisition to answer the charge of including irreverent matter in the large canvas of the Last Supper he has just painted for the refectory of the Dominican basilica of Santi Giovanni e Paolo, Venice (to replace an earlier work by Titian destroyed in a fire in 1571). He responds by retitling it The Feast in the House of Levi.

== Works ==
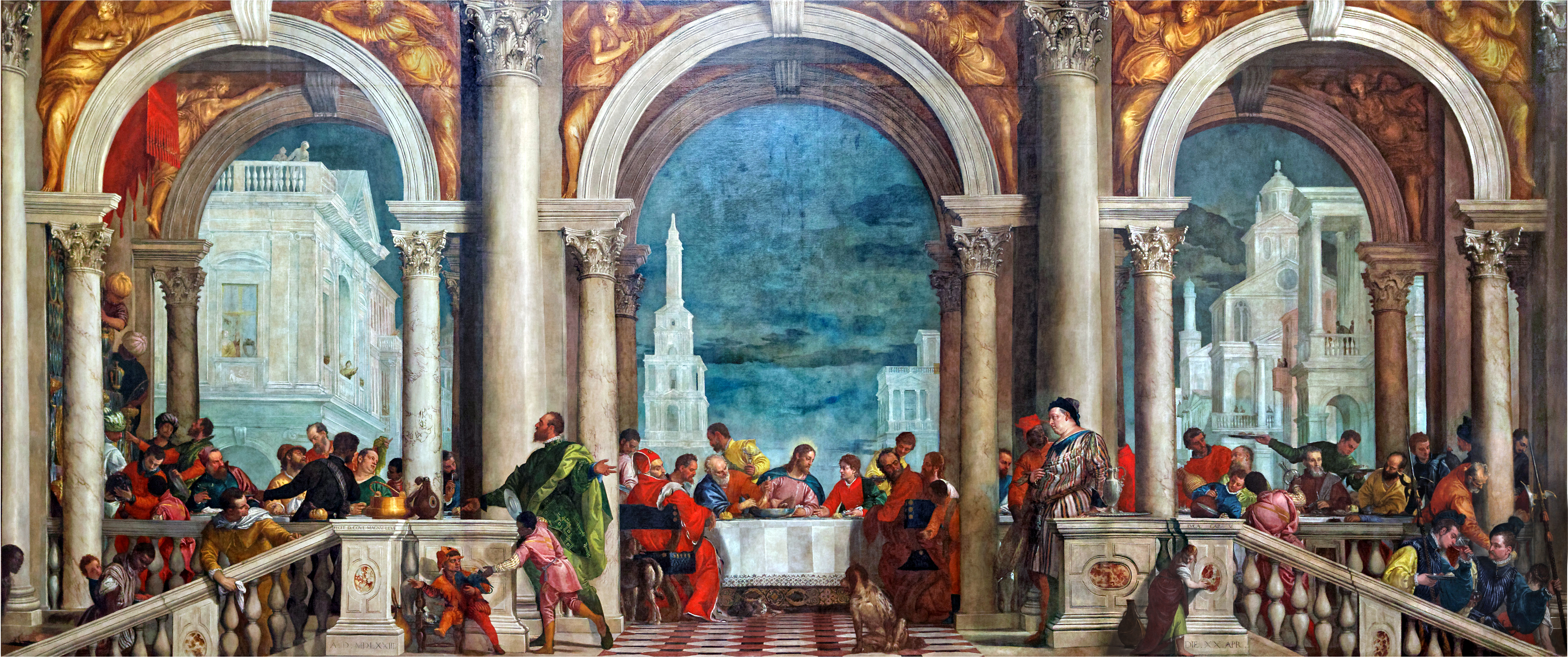
Veronese – The Feast in the House of Levi, Gallerie dell'Accademia

- Giuseppe Arcimboldo – Four Seasons series
- Giambologna – Female Figure (marble; approximate date)
- Johan Gregor van der Schardt – Self-portrait (painted terracotta bust; approximate date)
- Paolo Veronese
  - Adoration of the Magi
  - The Feast in the House of Levi
  - The Martyrdom of St. Justine (possible date)

== Births ==
- January 18 - Ambrosius Bosschaert, Dutch painter (died 1621)
- May 18 - Odoardo Fialetti, Italian painter and printmaker (died 1638)
- date unknown
  - Giovanni Battista Crespi, Italian painter, sculptor, and architect (died 1632)
  - Jacob Hoefnagel, Flemish naturalist and artist (died 1630)
  - Hendrik Hondius, Dutch painter (died 1649)
  - Pier Francesco Mazzucchelli, Italian painter of frescoes and altarpieces (died 1626)
  - Tiberio di Tito, Italian painter of portraits, including small pencil portraits (died 1627)
  - Sebastian Vrancx, Flemish Baroque painter and etcher of the Antwerp school (died 1647)
  - Wu Bin, Chinese landscape painter during the Ming Dynasty (died 1620)

== Deaths ==
- probable - Cornelis van Dalem, Flemish painter (born c.1530/1535)
