= Pan Deng =

Chinese contemporary artist and painter

- Born: 1964 (age 61–62); Nanjing, China
- Known for: Painting
- Style: Contemporary

Pan Deng (Chinese: 潘登; pinyin: Pān Dēng; born in 1964, in Nanjing, China) is a Chinese contemporary artist and painter. He is the vice chairman of the Yang Jianhou Foundation and a member of Arts Mid-Hudson.

== Career ==
In 1986 and 2002, Pan was invited to take part in Basking – Nanjing Art Activity twice. In 2005, he participated in Disease: Our Art Today held at Nanjing Museum, and the works were collected by the curator Guo Haiping.

In 2007, The Foundry Space was looking for outstanding artists in Nanjing, Pan was the only selected artist, and he successfully held a personal art exhibition Animal Farm - Pan Deng Solo Exhibition in Shanghai, His Piggy was collected by the gallery.

In 2008, he was invited to participate in Red Land - 100 Top Artists Exhibition under Single Roof at Artbase.

In 2014, he was invited to be a visiting artist of Mid-Hudson Heritage Center. During that period, he took part in the Queen City Arts Festival and successfully held a solo exhibition. Three works were collected by Hudson Art Center, and he was taken in to be a member of Hudson Artists Association. The oil painting Panda - M Love won the international gold prize in World Chinese Selected Arts Exhibition & World Wide Art Los Angeles, and at the same time, he was awarded the honorary title of China-America Culture and Art Exchange Messenger by the organizing committee. In the same year, he held in The Unrealistic Truth - 2014 Pan Deng Solo Art Show in San Jose, California, and he was paid much attention to by the local paper media: The World Daily, Sing Tao Daily, and the network media: Overseas Headlines.

His works were collected by the National Art Museum of China, Beijing Sunshine International Art Museum, Snowscape Culture and Art (Beijing) Co., Ltd., Shangdong Contemporary Art Center, and the institutions and private collectors of the United States, Canada, Denmark, France, Britain, South Korea, and China. His works were selected into Three Sets of Contemporary Painting, Chinese Painting Masters, Chinese Contemporary Art Document 2012, Contemporary Art Yearbook 2008, and other important professional publications, and he also published his album Pan Deng Oil Paintings.

He currently resides in Sacramento, California.

== Exhibitions ==
=== Solo exhibitions ===
2023

From Songzhuang to Silicon Valley, Silicon Valley Asian Art Center, US

2018

Fragment - Pan Deng's Easel Painting Exhibition, Chinese Art Gallery, San Leandro, California

2014
The Unrealistic Truth - 2014 Pan Deng Solo Art Show, Hanhai Exhibition Hall, San Jose, California
Pan Deng Solo Exhibition, Mid-Hudson Heritage Center, New York, USA

2007
Animal Farm - Pan Deng Solo Exhibition, The Foundry Space, Shanghai, China

=== Group exhibitions ===
2017

The 2nd Annual BORDERLESS Contemporary Art Exhibition, ShiMo Center for the Arts, Sacramento, California

The Us Show: Reflections of our Diversity，Blue Line Gallery, Roseville, California

2016

BORDERLESS • Contemporary Art Group Exhibition, San Mateo Art Studio, California

Famous Artist from Two Banks and Four Regions of China Invitational Exhibition, San Francisco International Art Center, California

IMPRESSION• International Art Forum & Exhibition, South San Francisco Conference Center, California
CROSSING BORDERS • San Francisco International Art Exhibit, San Francisco International Art Center, California

2015
ARTIBATOR Launching Ceremony & SVC Angel Conference, Santa Clara, California
First Annual Contemporary Asia Art Exhibition, Mid-Hudson Heritage Center, New York, US

2014
China • Jiangsu Style - Contemporary Art Exhibition, Beijing Four-dimensional Era Art Space, Beijing, China
World Wide Art Los Angeles, Los Angeles Convention Center, Los Angeles, California
Queen City Arts • Festival, Mid-Hudson Heritage Center, New York, USA
Beyond Three Worlds • Destruction, Beijing No.1 Park D, Art Institut, 5 Arts Center, Beijing, China

2013
We: 1994~2013 - The 20th Anniversary Collective Exhibition of China Song Zhuang Artists, Song Zhuang Art Museum, Beijing, China
2013 The Exhibition of Artists' Plan and Sketch, Jiu Ceng Gallery, Beijing, China
Jiangsu Area - Experience：2013 Avant-Garde Artist Exhibition，Chinese professional painter Art Museum, Beijing, China
Spring Flowers - Contemporary Art Exhibition, Yibing Art Space, Beijing, China
The 115 Artists Self- Portraits, Beijing Contemporary Art Museum, Beijing, China

2012
The First Contemporary Art 'weibo' Exhibition in 2012, Songzhuang Art Center，Beijing, China
18 Dagao Contemporary Art Exhibition, Beijing Dagao Museum, Beijing, China
Hypocrite - Contemporary Art Exhibition, Beijing Sumeng Art Gallery, Beijing, China
Art Collectors Nomination Exhibition, Mayland Artwork Exchange Center, Guangzhou, China

2011
History• New Songzhuang - 2011 New Songzhuang Era Art Exhibition, Sunshine International Art Museum, Beijing, China
Beyond reality - Easel Art, Sihe Fine Art Space, Suzhou, China

2010
China Contemporary Art Yearbook Exhibition, Sunshine International Art Museum, Beijing, China
Crossover - 2010 The 6th Culture and Art Festival of Songzhuang-China: "Antiblotio" Nanjing Art Community, Hongwan Art Museum, Beijing, China
Casual Art Festival, Sunshine International Art Museum, Beijing, China
Made in Nanjing - 2010 Contemporary Exhibition, New B Gallery, Shanghai, China
2010 Annual Exhibition of Contemporary Art, Shangdong Contemporary Art Center, Nanjing, China

2009
Let's Play Together, Soul Collection Art, Beijing, China
2009 Fifth China Songzhuang Cultural Arts Festival Nanjing Mufu Mountain Artists Community Exhibition, Songzhuang Art Center，Beijing, China
Pebeo Nanjing Mufu Art District 2009 Spring Art Salon, Nanjing Qinghe Contemporary Art Museum, Nanjing, China

2008
Red Land - 100 Top Artists Exhibition under Single Roof at Artbase, Beijing No.1 International Artbase, Beijing China
Four, Three, Two, One - Four Artists Contemporary Art Exhibition, Beijing Artist Village, Beijing, China

2007
99 Tents, 99 Dreams, Left Right Art Zone, Beijing, China
Fractal Image - Art Nanjing, Nanjing Museum, Nanjing, China

2005
Disease: Our Art Today, Nanjing Art Museum, Nanjing, China

2002
Basking - Nanjing Art Activity, Datang Golden Island, Nanjing, China

1999
One Hundred Years, One Hundred People, One Hundred Surnames, Nanjing Normal University, Nanjing, China

1996
Edge Sight - Artworks Exhibition, Jiangsu Provincial Art Museum, Nanjing, China

1986
Basking - Nanjing Art Activity, Xuanwu Lake Garden, Nanjing, China

== Collections ==
Arts Mid-Hudson
Snowscape Culture and Art (Beijing) Co., Ltd.
Sunshine International Art Museum
Shangdong Contemporary Art Center
Beijing No.1 Space Gallery
