= Pang Laichen =

Chinese art collector (1864-1949)

Pang Laichen, also known as Pang Yuanji (1864–1949) was a Chinese art collector and patron who let artists live at his private residence. His art collection included paintings by Qiu Ying.

In 1959, his grandson Paul Zenghe donated 137 paintings to the Nanjing Museum. The Chinese authorities investigated theft from the collection in 2025, and released their findings to the public in 2026.
