= Tinti =

Tinti is a surname. Notable people with the surname include:

- Camillo Tinti (born c. 1738), Italian painter
- Gabriele Tinti (actor) (1932–1991), Italian actor
- Gabriele Tinti (poet) (born 1979), Italian writer
- Giovanni Battista Tinti (1558-1617), Italian painter of the Renaissance period
- Hannah Tinti (born 1973), American writer and the co-founder of One Story magazine
- Lorenzo Tinti (1626–1672), Italian painter and engraver of the Baroque period
- Nicoletta Tinti (born 1979), Italian rhythmic gymnast

== See also ==
- Tinti-Oulen, is a town and sub-prefecture in the Kankan Prefecture in the Kankan Region of eastern Guinea
