= Ni Tian =

Chinese painter (1855–1919)

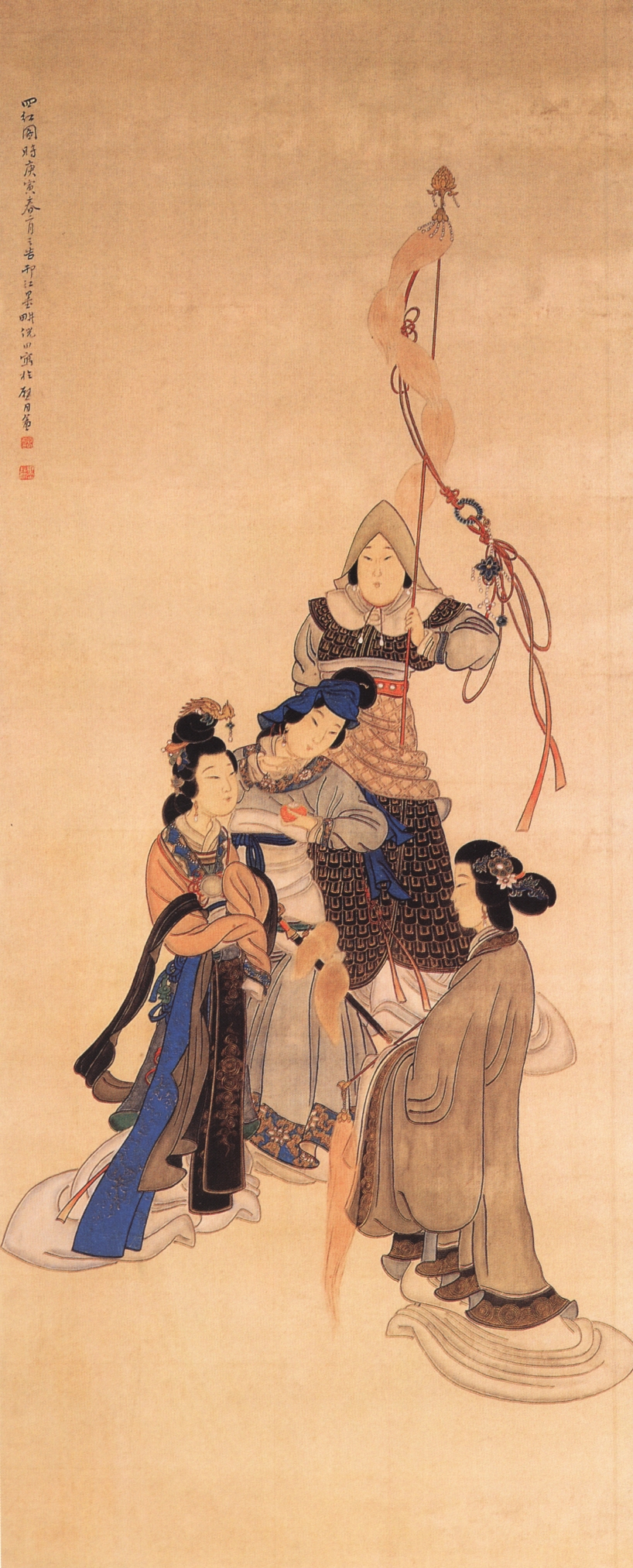
Four Beauties (四红图), Ni Tian, Nanjing Museum

Ni Tian (Chinese: 倪田; 1855–1919), born as Baotian (Chinese: 寶田), courtesy name Mogeng (Chinese: 墨畢), art name Modaoren and Biyueanzhu, was a Chinese painter in Qing Dynasty and Republic Period. He was from Yangzhou, though he later moved to Shanghai. He was a member of the Shanghai School and primarily painted landscapes, figures and flowers.
