= 1556 in art =

Events from the year 1556 in art.

== Works ==
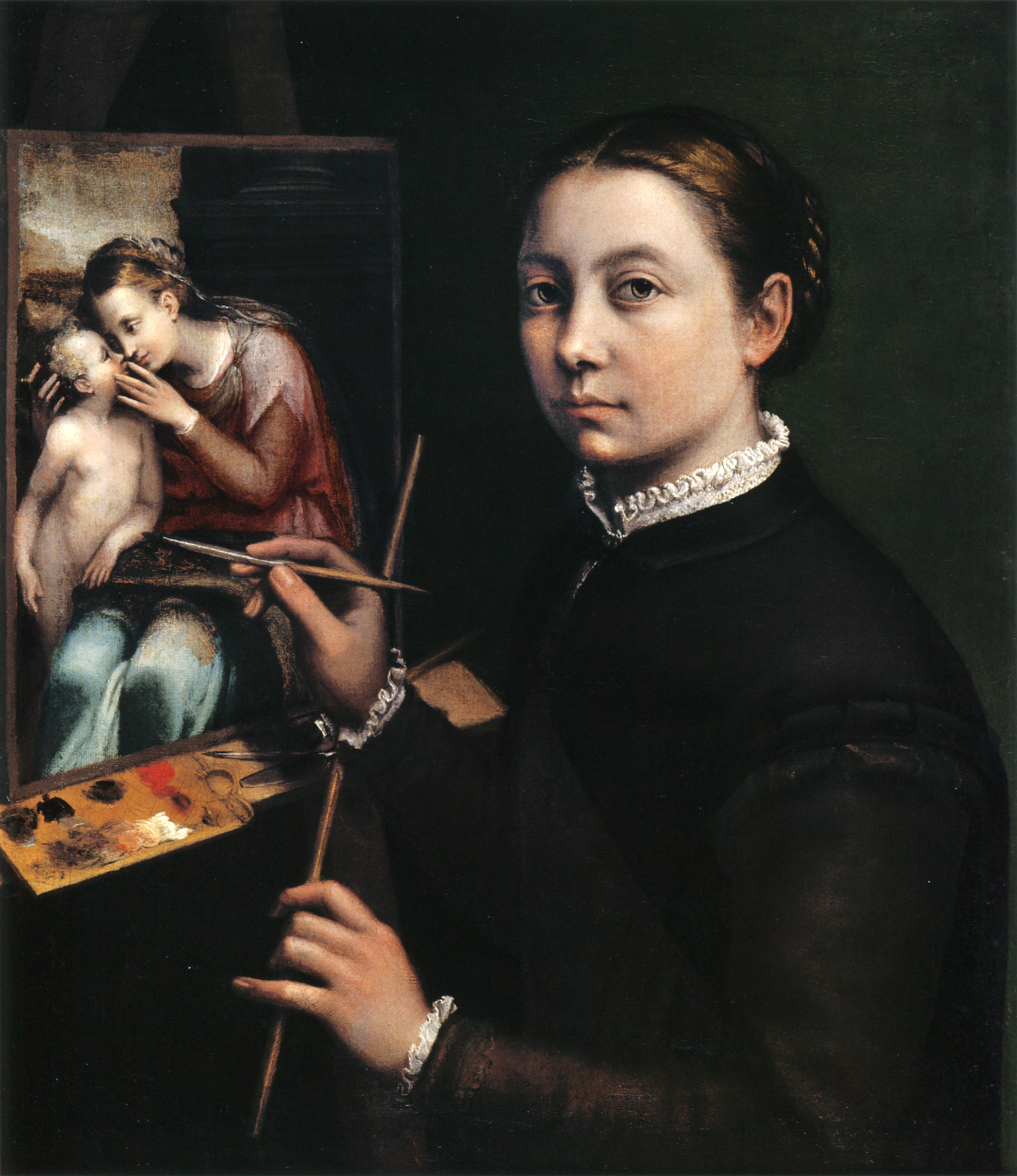
Self-portrait by Sofonisba Anguissola

- Sofonisba Anguissola – Self-portrait at the easel
- Jan Sanders van Hemessen – The Parable of the Unmerciful Servant
- Paolo Veronese - Jupiter Hurling Thinderbolts at the Vices (Begun in 1554 - completed in 1556 - created for the Sala dei Consiglio dei Dieci, of the Palazzo Ducale in Venice, now in the collection of the Louvre)

== Births ==
- August 16 - Bartolomeo Cesi, Italian painter of the Bolognese School (died 1629)
- October 24 - Giovanni Battista Caccini, Italian sculptor (died 1613)
- date unknown
  - Giovanni Bizzelli, Italian painter (died 1612)
  - Aurelio Lomi, Italian painter of frescoes (died 1622)
  - Carlo Maderno, Italian architect (died 1629)
  - Alessandro Maganza, Italian Mannerist painter (died 1630)
  - Pietro Malombra, Italian painter (died 1618)
  - Lazzaro Tavarone, Genoese painter (died 1641)
- probable
  - Adrien de Vries, late Mannerist sculptor born in the Netherlands (died 1626)
  - Otto van Veen, painter, draughtsman, and humanist (died 1629)

== Deaths ==
- April - Cristofano Gherardi, Italian Mannerist painter (born 1508)
- August 1 - Girolamo da Carpi, court painter and decorator to the Duke d'Este (born 1501)
- date unknown
  - Luca Penni, Italian painter, member of the School of Fontainebleau (born 1500)
  - Girolamo da Santa Croce, Italian Renaissance painter (born 1480/1485)
- probable – Jan Mostaert, Haarlem painter (born 1475)
