= Tiberio di Tito =

Italian painter

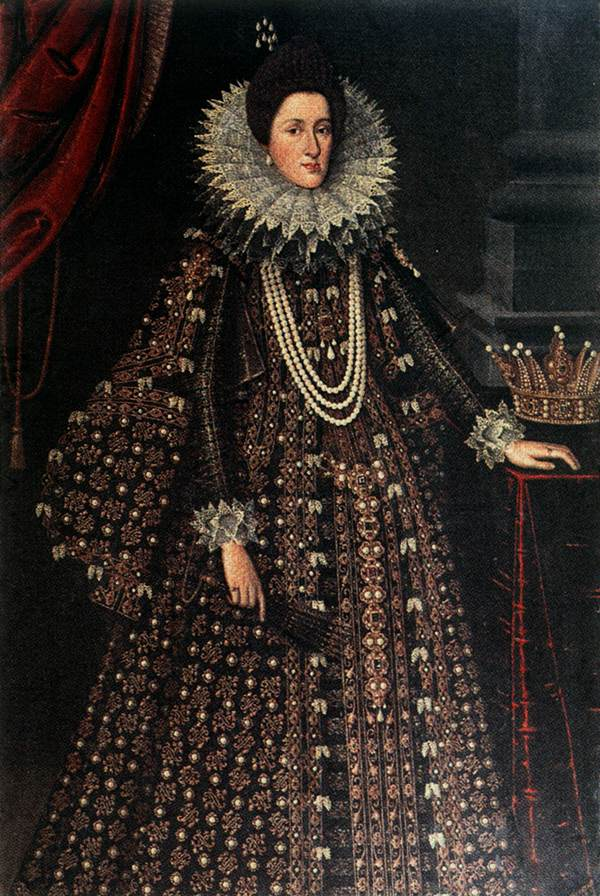
Portrait of Maria Maddalena of Austria, by Tiberio di Tito, Uffizi, 1610

Tiberio di Tito (1573–1627) was an Italian painter. He was born in Florence. He was the son and pupil of the late-Mannerist painter Santi di Tito. He specialized in portrait painting, including small pencil portraits, on which he was much employed by Cardinal Leopoldo de' Medici.
