= Judas Repentant, Returning the Pieces of Silver =

1629 painting by Rembrandt

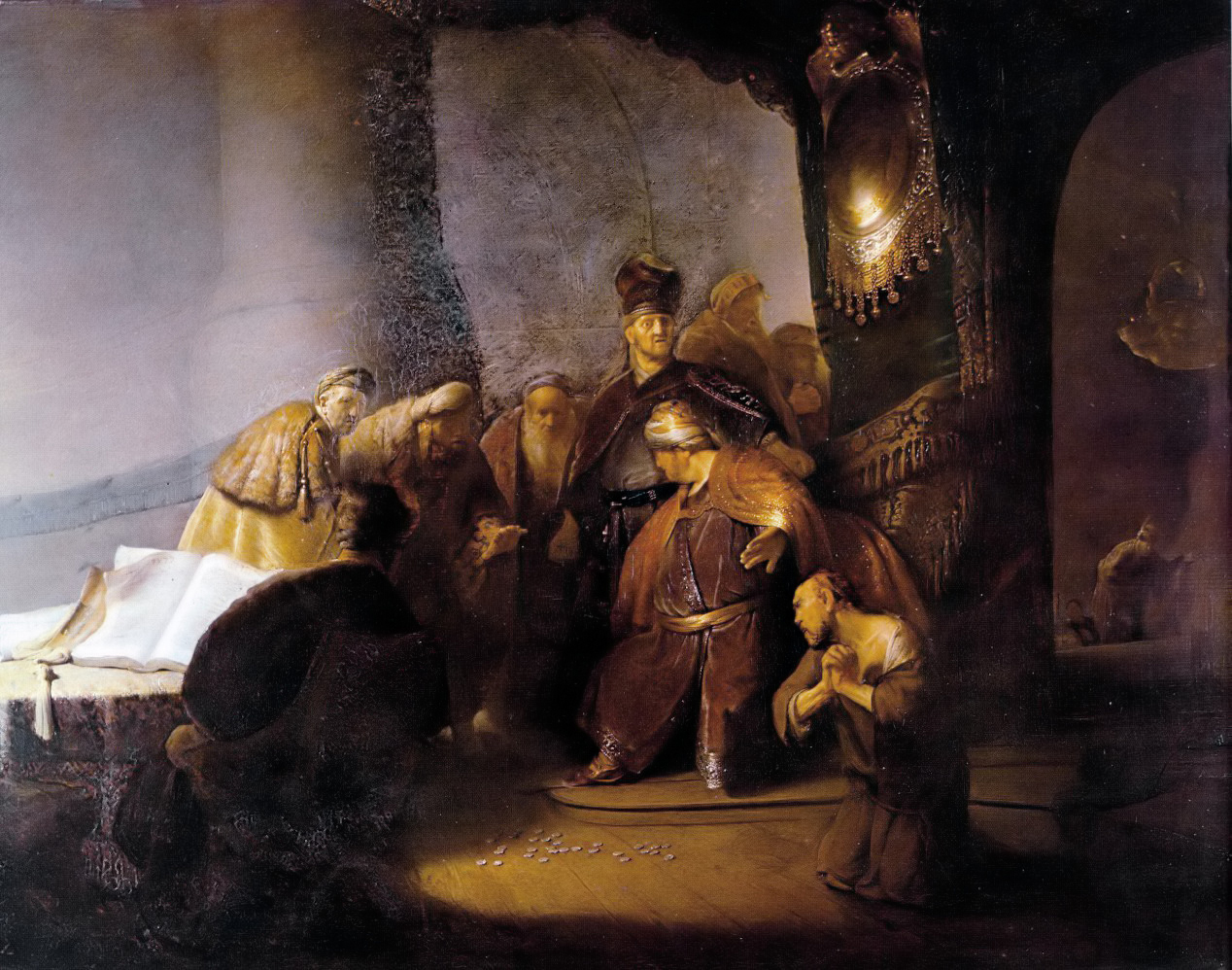
- Judas Repentant
- Artist: Rembrandt
- Year: 1629
- Type: painting
- Medium: oil on wood
- Subject: A repentant Judas returns the thirty pieces of silver to the Temple.
- Dimensions: 79 cm × 102 cm (31 in × 40 in)
- Location: Private Collection
- Owner: private collection

Judas Returning the Thirty Pieces of Silver is a painting by Rembrandt. It depicts the story of Matthew 27:3: "Then Judas, who had betrayed him, when he saw that he was condemned, repented himself, and brought again the thirty pieces of silver to the chief priests and elders".

Made in 1629 while he was working in Leiden, the painting is one of Rembrandt's earliest works. Around 1630, Constantijn Huygens wrote an analysis of the figure of Judas in it, arguing that Rembrandt had surpassed the painters from antiquity, as well as the great sixteenth-century Italian artists when it came to the representation of emotions expressed by figures that act in a history painting.

Because of the notoriety of Judas' betrayal of Jesus, this event in the gospels was rarely, if ever, portrayed before and this is the only instance of Rembrandt painting this scene. Here Judas is portrayed as a wretched and remorseful figure. Bloodstains on Judas' head show he has torn his hair out. Huygens used the words "maddened" and "devoid of hope" to describe Judas, and Rembrandt illustrates this with Judas' wringing hands and pained grimace. The high priest has dramatically turned away from Judas and the other elders seem at a loss for what to do. The one reading a codex seems to be counting up the pieces of silver (there are 30). Nobody meets the eye of anyone else: a technique used by Edward Hopper centuries later.

== Literature ==
- David Bomford, Art in the making - Rembrandt, Catalogue, The National Gallery (London 2006), p. 54–61.
