= Pierre Prieur =

French painter

Pierre Prieur (c. 1626–1676) was a French enamel painter.

== Life ==
He married Marie (1610–1677), sister of Jean Petitot, as her second husband. In 1669 he was in England, painting a miniature of Charles II of England and another of Lady Castlemaine, both after Cooper, for the king of Denmark. In 1670 he was in Poland, painting for the Danish monarch a portrait of King Michał Korybut Wiśniowiecki, and in the following year was in Denmark executing a remarkable series of portraits of the children of Frederick III of Denmark. All these, with some beautiful enamel badges for the Order of the Elephant, are held in the Danish royal collection.

By Christian V of Denmark he is said to have been sent to Spain and Russia, where several examples of his work, dated 1676, are to be seen in the Hermitage. In the following year he died in Denmark. He was a Huguenot, and was said to possess secret colors in enamel, especially a blue, which were not known to his Petitot relations. His work in England is of great rarity, Lord Dartrey possessing the finest example, and there are two remarkable works in the Pierpont Morgan collection and one at Windsor Castle. Two in the Propert collection have been lost sight of.
