= Federico Agnelli =

Italian artist (1626–1702)

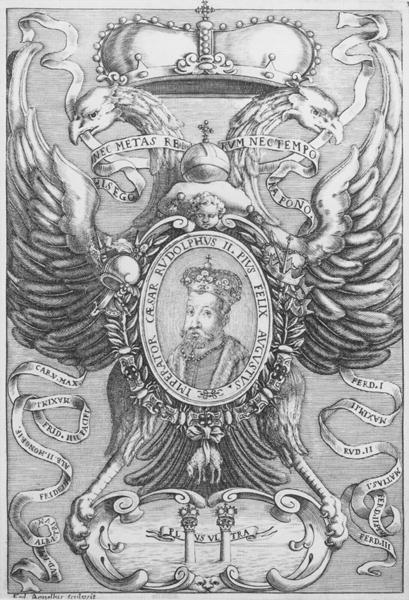
Emperor Rudolf II, Plate 11 of 'The Emperors of the Habsburg Dynasty', 1649–1657, engraving by Frederico Agnelli.

Federico Agnelli (1626–1702) was an Italian intaglio printer, engraver and typographer, active in Milan. He was chiefly employed in portraits, though he occasionally engraved emblematical and architectural subjects. He engraved with the architect Carlo Butio a set of plates representing the Cathedral at Milan.

== Biography ==
He was the founder of the Milanese typography, which was called after his family name and his descendants held this shop in Santa Margherita for almost three centuries.

It is considered that he first dedicated himself to portraiture, he executed, among other things, engraved portraits of the emperors Ferdinand II and Ferdinand III and of Pope Innocent XI. Then his company turned to views of Milan and especially of the cathedral, and the reproduction of monuments and aspects of the city was the constant care of the company. But he also took care of Rome.

Federico was also an engraver, whose work was not always easily differentiated from that of his relatives; and often the engravings were simply signed "Agnelli" or "Agnellus". The engraving activity actually prevailed over the strictly editorial one: here we should mention the printing of The Lent of Fr. P. Segneri and The Sermons of Fr. Pasquale Carafa. For the production of religious works he had the protection of ecclesiastical authority, and on 11 May 1694 Brother Innocenzo, prior of the Certosa di Pavia and Minister General of the Carthusians, declared him, together with his wife and children, the meritorious of the Order.
