= Orazio Bruni =

Orazio Bruni (born c. 1630) was an Italian engraver of the Baroque period. He was born at Siena. He worked entirely with the graver, and appears to have imitated the style of François de Poilly. He engraved plates from his own designs and others from Rutilio Manetti and others. Among his plates are The Prodigal Son, The Golden Age, A set of the Four Seasons, A set of various Animals, a Warrior, and a Female in a Triumphal Car, with Minerva presenting a Sceptre.
