= Portrait of the Infante Don Carlos =

Painting by Diego Velázquez

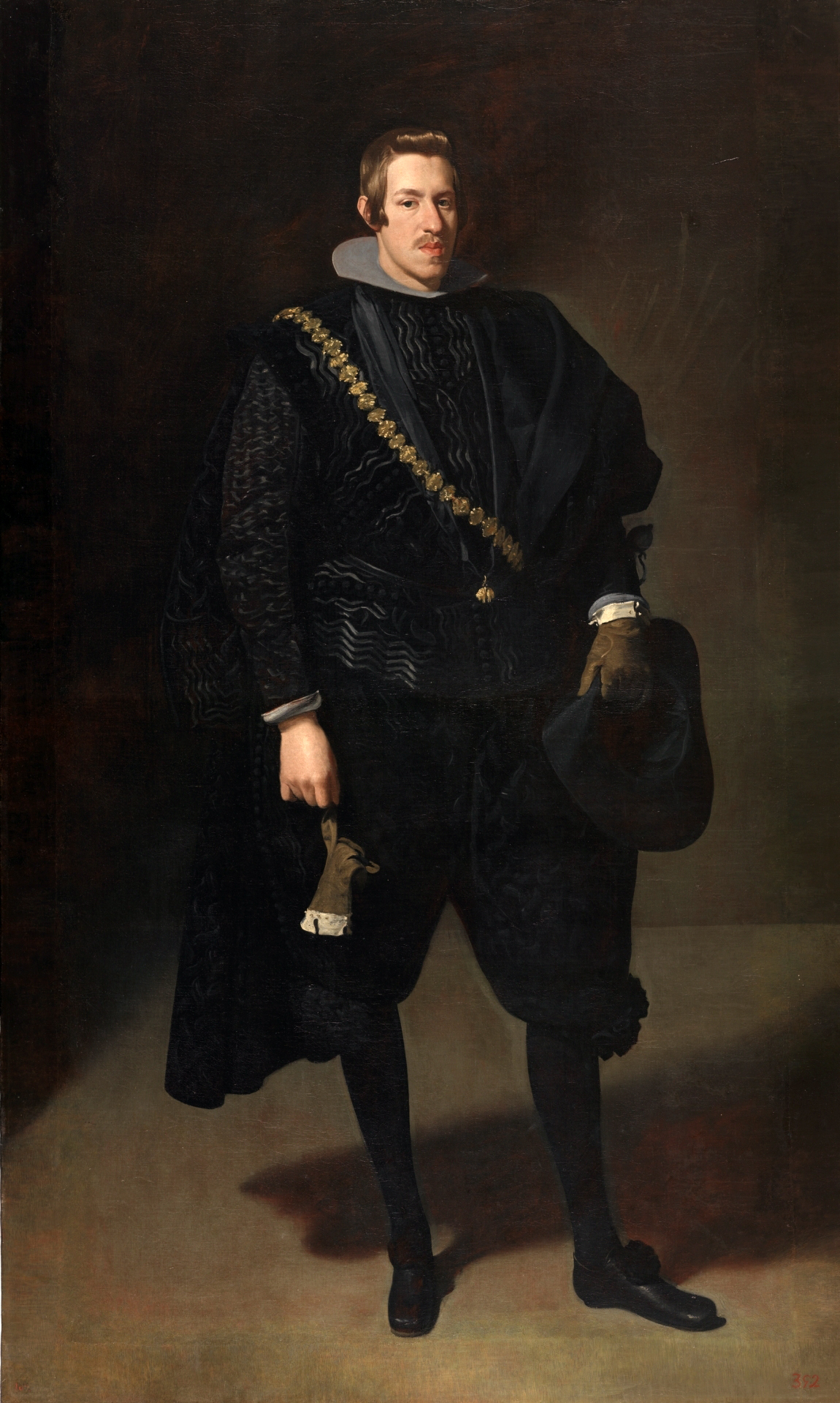
- Artist: Diego Velázquez
- Year: 1626
- Type: Oils
- Location: Museo del Prado; Madrid

Portrait of the Infante Don Carlos is a 1626/27 oil painting of Don Carlos of Spain (brother to Philip IV of Spain), produced by Diego Velázquez as one of the first paintings he produced during his stay in Madrid. It is now in the Prado.

Its subject is in a relaxed and elegant pose, wearing a black costume with grey braids and a thick gold shoulder chain with the Order of the Golden Fleece and holding a hat in his left hand and a glove in his right. The figure appears in the darkest point of the space and the artist added a 4 cm strip on each side to add to its sense of authoritarianism.

== See also ==
- List of works by Diego Velázquez
