= Hendrick Bogaert =

Dutch Golden Age painter

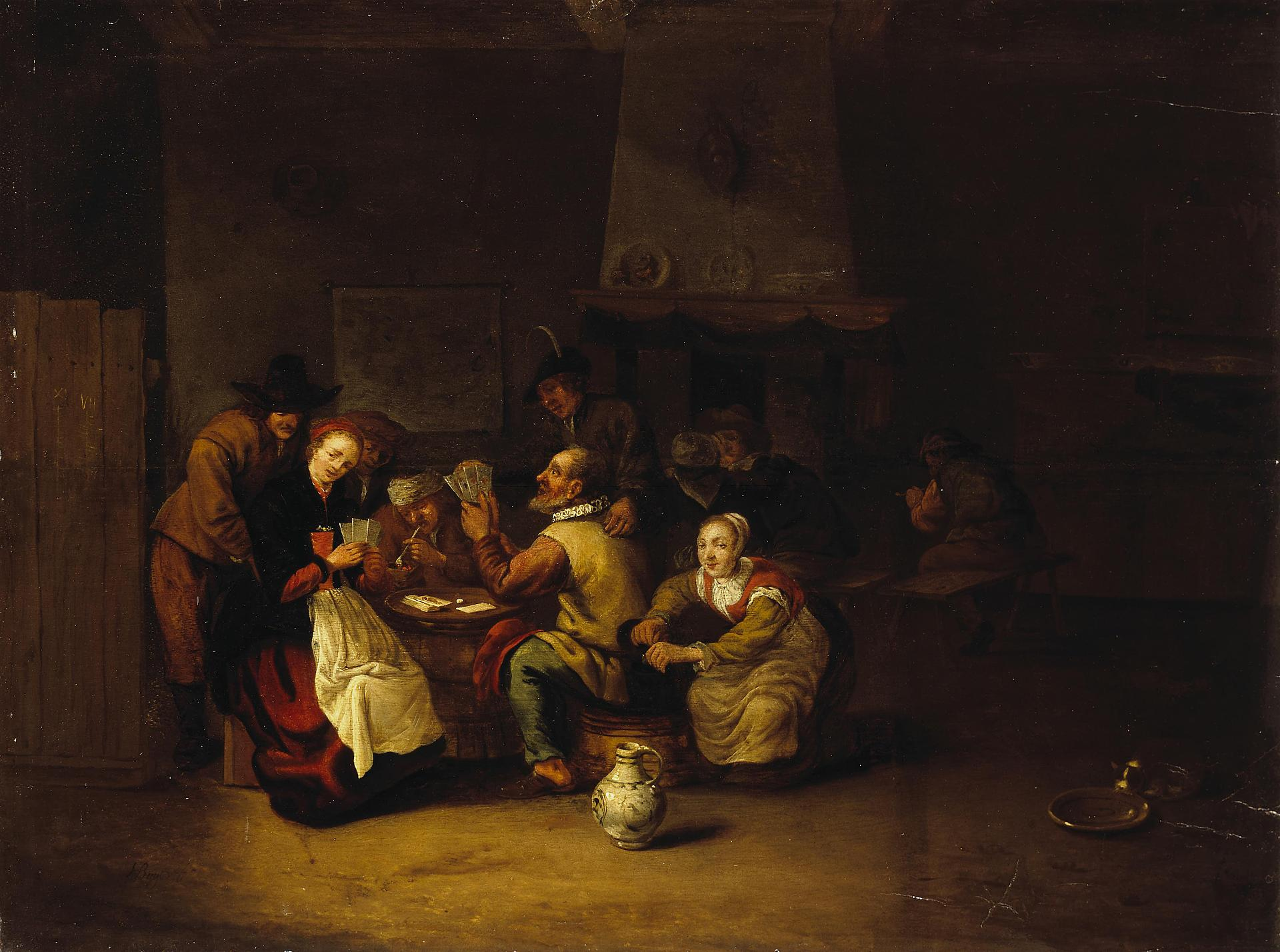
Card-playing, the Hermitage, Saint-Petersburg

Hendrick (also spelled Hendrik) Hendricksz. Bogaert (1630 – 1675) was a Dutch Golden Age painter, known for intimate and animated genre interiors depicting mostly scenes of conviviality, music, and merrymaking. His works belong to the tradition of merry company painting.

== Biography ==
Bogaert was born in Amsterdam, probably between 1626 and 1632, the son of a woodworker. He appears to have spent a large part of his life in the city. On 10 February 1657 he posted marriage banns with Marritjen Centen; at that time he lived on the Reguliersbreestraat in the house De Drie Koeyekaesen. By the time of his wife’s burial in December 1673, he was residing in the Wagenstraat.

According to the RKD he was the teacher of Joseph Mulder in 1672. Houbraken said Bogaert died in the Rotterdam "Gasthuis", or hospice, because he never saved money for his own old age. He lived life day-to-day, and was said to respond to friendly admonitions to think of his future for fear of landing in the gasthuis, with the comment "What's wrong with the hospice? Is it for Pigs?".

According to the RKD, Bogaert died in Amsterdam, at some period between 1675 and 1695. Other sources say he died in Rotterdam.

== See also ==
- Dutch Golden Age painting
