= Annunciation (Reni) =

Painting by Guido Reni

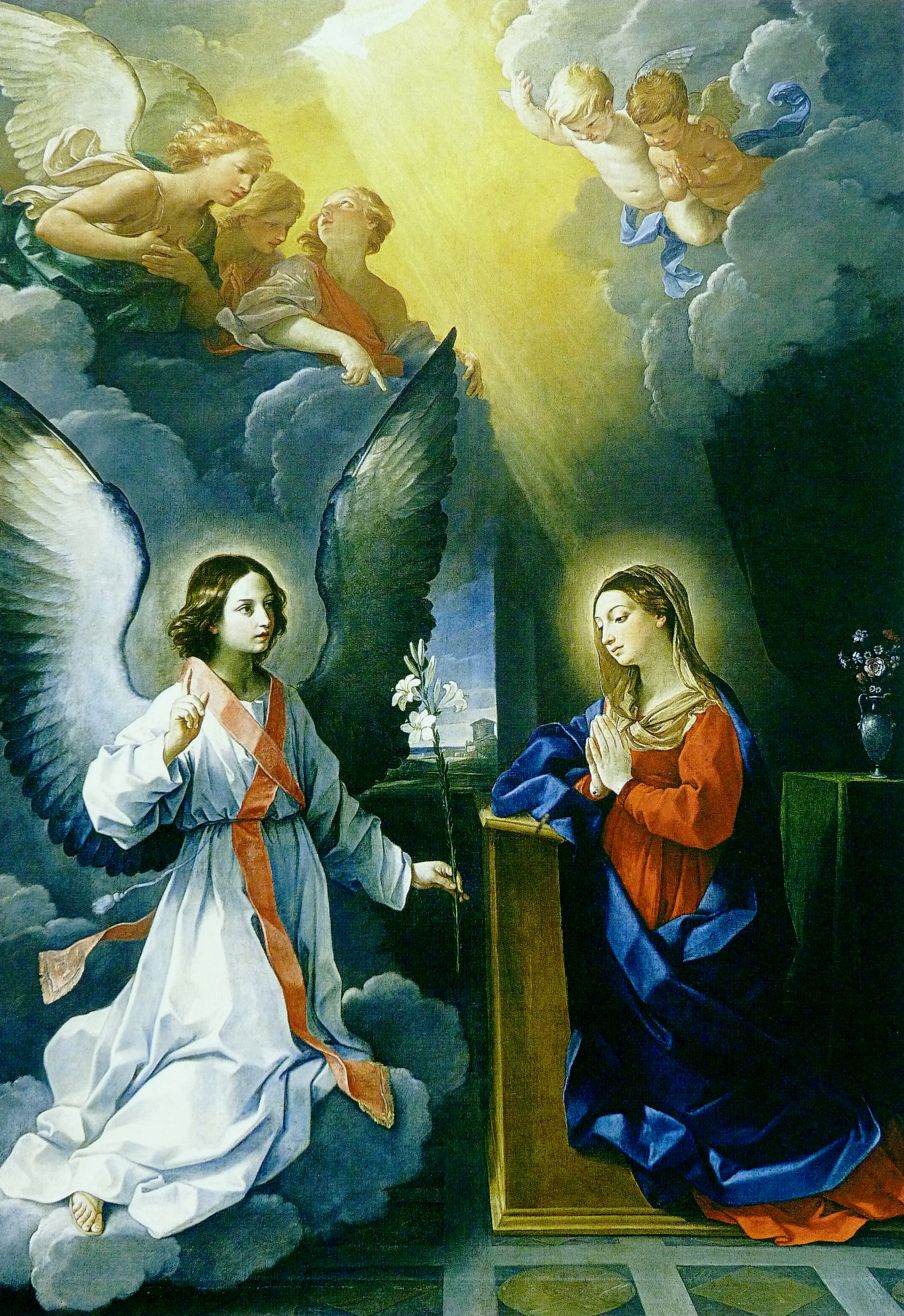
Annunciation (c. 1629) by Guido Reni

Annunciation is an oil on canvas painting by Guido Reni, commissioned by Marie de' Medici and probably painted in early 1629. The first large painting by the artist to reach France, it is now Inventory Number 521 in the Louvre Museum, displayed on the first floor in Room 12 of the Grande Galerie. Reni also produced an earlier and less-worked-up version of the work in 1621 for the church of San Pietro in Valle, Fano which is now in that town's art gallery.

== History ==
With the commission for the Annunciation as a first step, Marie de' Medici contacted Reni via Cardinal Bernardino Spada with a failed attempt to persuade him to come to Paris in order to paint the second gallery of the palais du Luxembourg, a commission initially given Rubens. Placed in a sumptuous marble and gilded wood frame on the high altar of the church of the couvent des Carmélites du faubourg Saint-Jacques in Paris, it was moved to that church's choir before 1684.

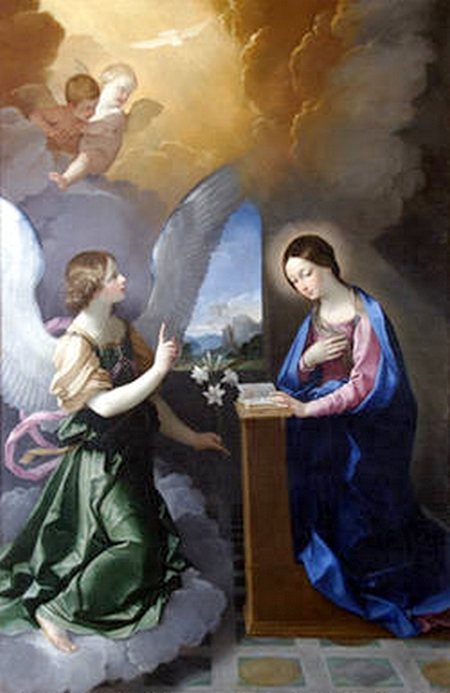
1621 version

The work was admired in 1665 by Bernini, who called it "one of the most beautiful things to be seen, which on its own was worth half of Paris". Before the mid 17th century the work had a major influence on contemporary painters such as Laurent de La Hyre, Philippe de Champaigne, Jacques Stella and Eustache Le Sueur (all leaders of 'Atticism', a major classicising movement in French art of that time) and was praised by art historians and critics such as Claude Malingre (1640), Symonds (1649), Germain Brice (1684)

On the French Revolution the work was seized and placed in storage at Les Petits-Augustins in September 1792 before becoming part of the initial nucleus collection of the Musée central des Arts de la République (later renamed the Louvre) that December. Several copies of the work survive, including one offered to Balaruc-les-Bains by Napoléon III and now on show in the church of Notre-Dame-de-l'Assomption in that town. Another copy is at the church of Saint-Germain-l'Auxerrois de Paris in Paris.

== Bibliography ==
- (in French) Jacques Thuillier, Histoire de l'art, éd. Flammarion, 2002.
- (in French) Alain Mérot, « L’atticisme parisien : réflexions sur un style » in Éloge de la clarté. Un courant artistique au temps de Mazarin 1640-1660, Éditions de la Réunion des Musées Nationaux, 1998.
- (in French) Stéphane Loire, Musée du Louvre : école italienne, XVIIe siecle, I. Bologne (Réunion des musées nationaux), 1996, p. 273-277.
- (in French) Stephen Pepper, Guido Reni, Oxford, 1984.
