= Henry Gibbs =

English painter

Henry Gibbs (1630/1–1713) was an English oil painter.

Gibbs worked in Canterbury, Kent. He painted "Aeneas and his Family Fleeing Burning Troy" in 1654, acquired by the Tate Britain gallery, London, in 1994. In 2025 it was announced that the picture would be given back to the descendants of Samuel Hartveld, from whose collection in Antwerp the Nazis looted it in 1940. There are also works by Gibbs in the Beaney House of Art and Knowledge and the Canterbury Heritage Museum. His paintings have been sold through Christie's auction house.
