= Juan Valdelmira de Leon =

Spanish painter

Juan Valdelmira de León (c.1630–c.1660) was a Spanish painter known for his still-life paintings of fruit and flowers. He was born in Navarre. He was instructed by his father at Valladolid, and after his death entered the school of Francisco Rizi at Madrid. He assisted that master in several of his works, particularly in the Portuguese church at Toledo, in the Retiro, and other places. But his chief excellence was in flowerpieces. He died in his thirtieth year.
