= Claude Bertin =

French artist

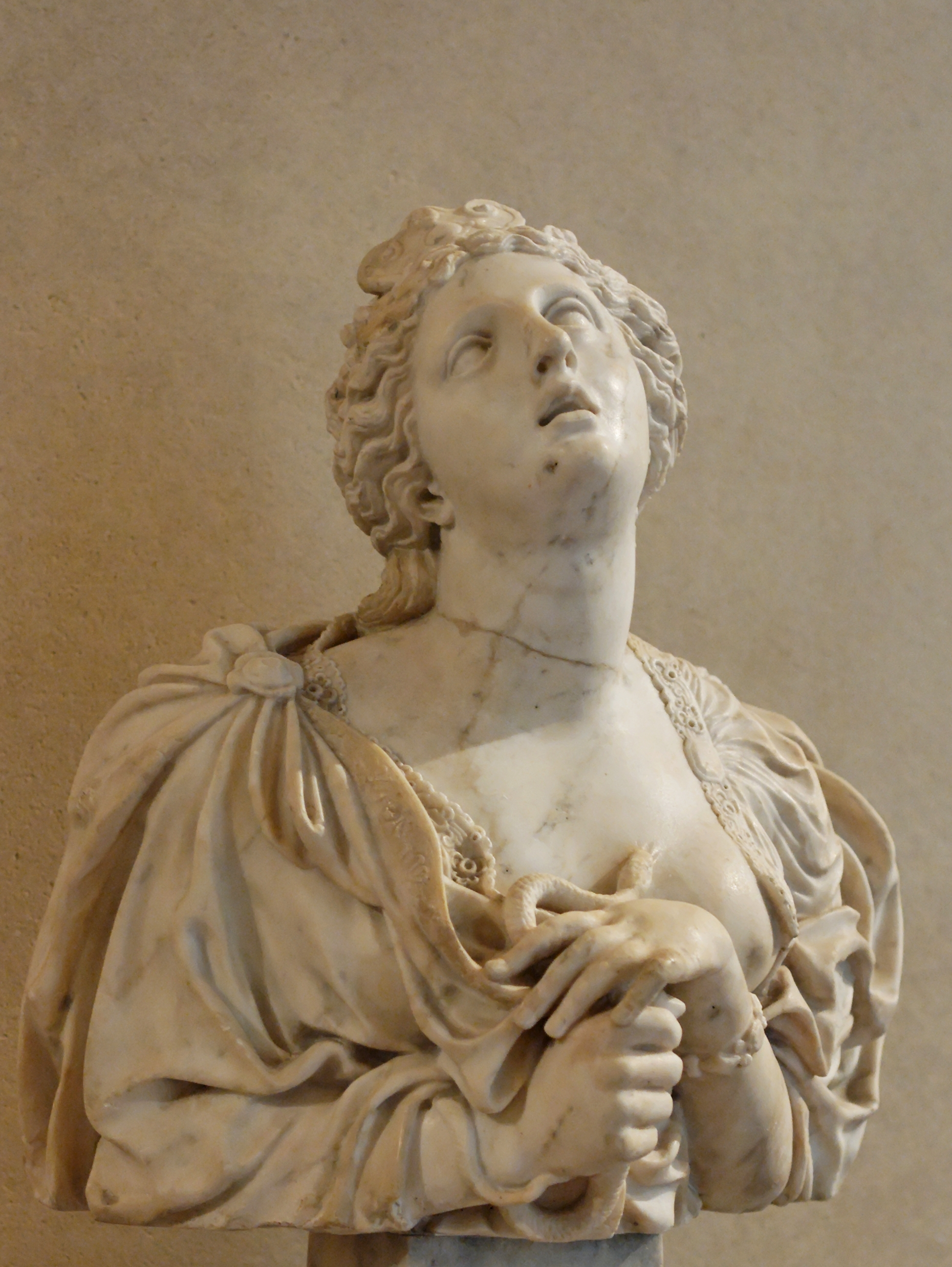
Cléopatra se suicidant by Claude Bertin, before 1697 (Musée du Louvre)

Claude Bertin (died 1705) was a French sculptor, who was part of the highly trained team that supplied sculptures for Versailles. His monumental marble vases, following the type of the Borghese Vase, with rich bas-reliefs of fruit, swags of ivy or friezes of mythological scenes, executed between 1687 and 1705, still adorn the terraces of Versailles.
