= Saint Rosalia Crowned by Angels (Houston) =

Painting by Anthony van Dyck

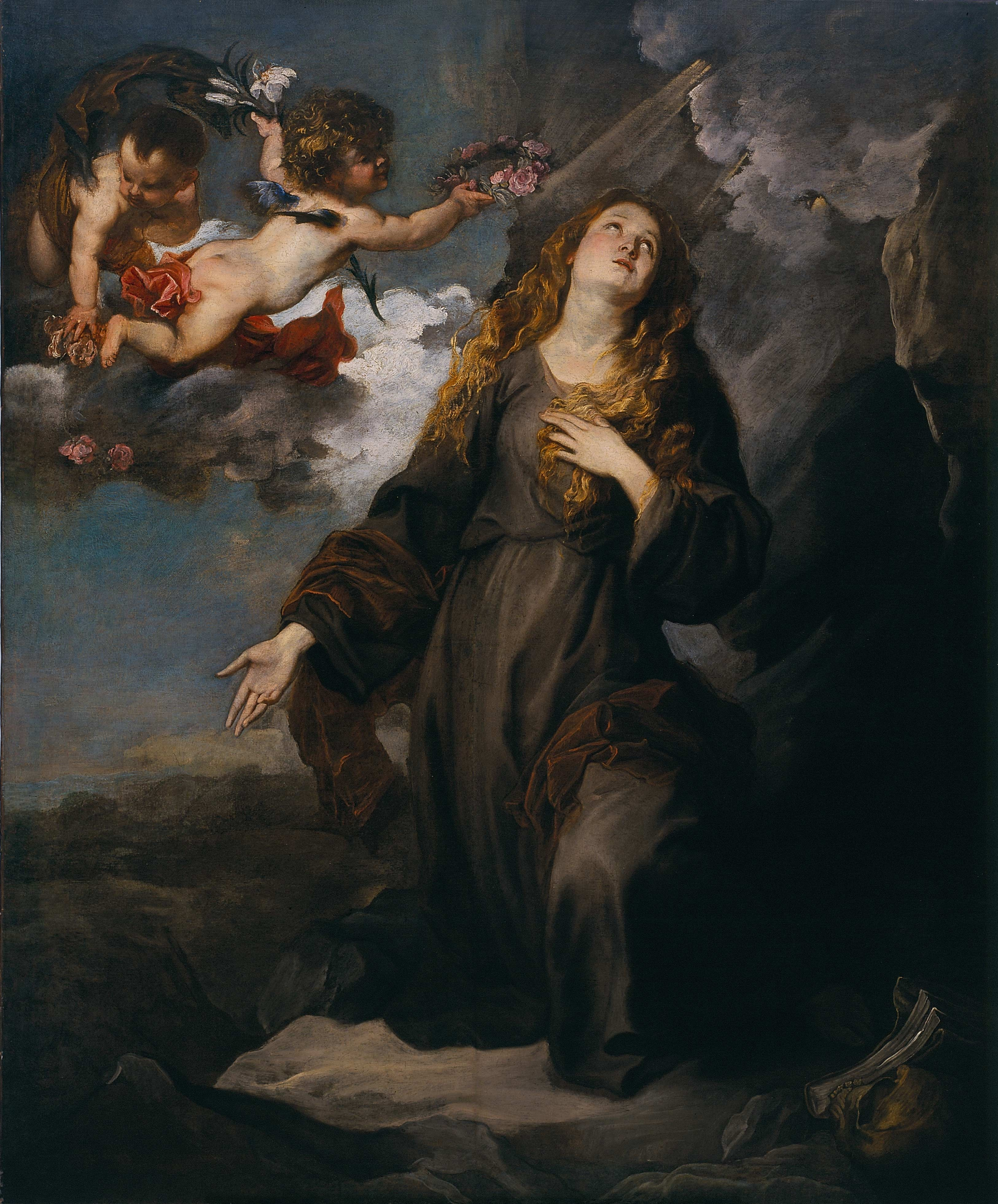
Saint Rosalia Crowned by Angels (c. 1625) by Anthony van Dyck

Saint Rosalia Crowned by Angels is a c. 1625 oil on canvas painting by Anthony van Dyck, one of five surviving works showing the saint which he produced whilst he was quarantined in Palermo, Sicily due to a plague. It is now in the Menil Collection in Houston, Texas, which bought it in 1968. It was loaned from there in 2011-2012 to the Dulwich Picture Gallery in London.

It shows the influence of Pietro Novelli, then also in the city, whilst its composition is very similar to two other 1624 works, one now in the Wellington Collection at Apsley House in London and the other still in Palermo.

== See also ==
- List of paintings by Anthony van Dyck
