= Saint Rosalia Crowned by Angels (London) =

Painting by Anthony van Dyck

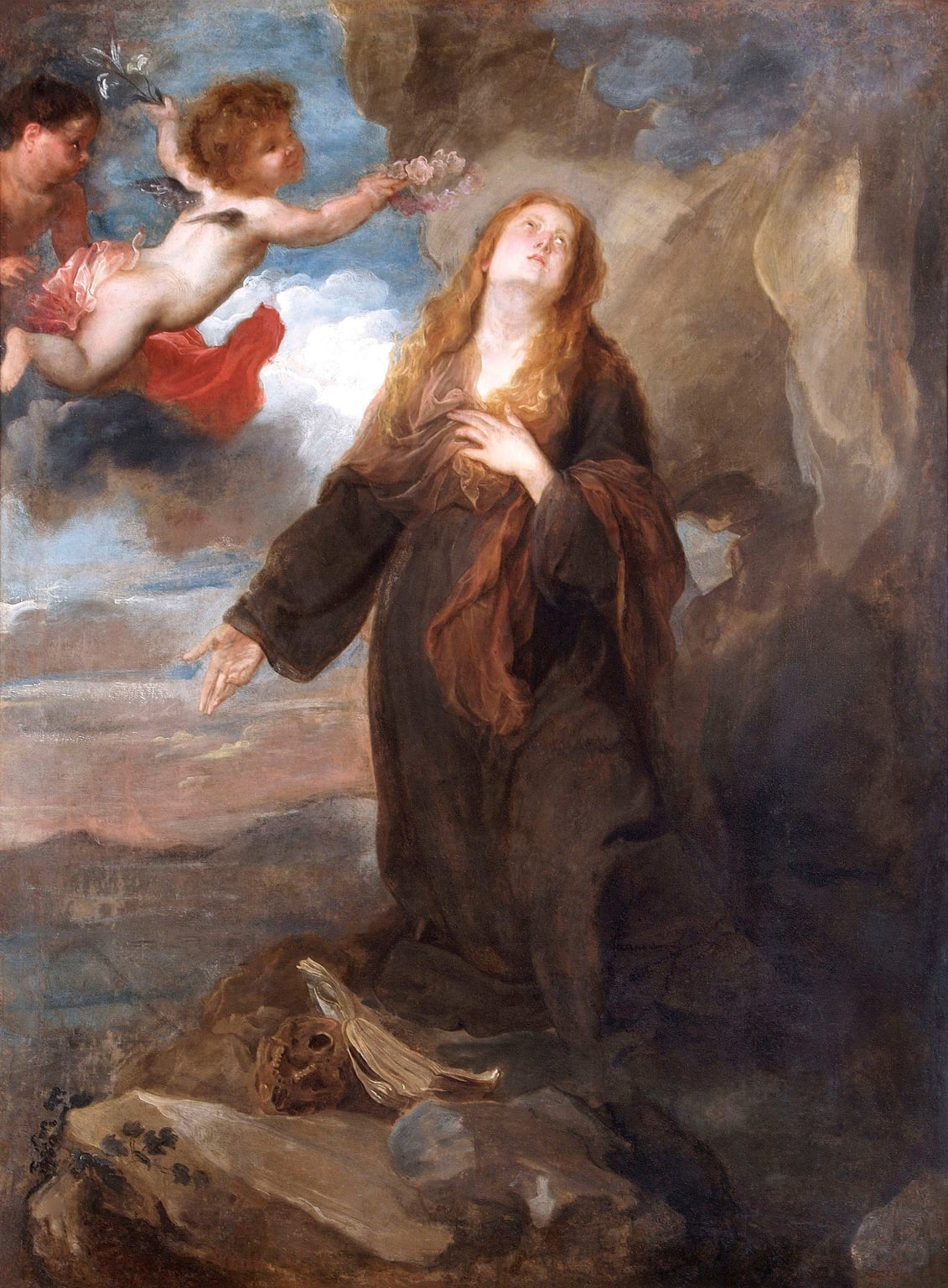
Saint Rosalia Crowned by Angels (London) (c. 1625) by Anthony van Dyck

Saint Rosalia Crowned by Angels is a c. 1625 oil on canvas painting by Anthony van Dyck, one of five surviving works showing the saint which he produced whilst he was quarantined in Palermo, Sicily due to a plague. It is now in the Wellington Collection at Apsley House in London.

In the painting Saint Rosalia intercedes for the plague-stricken. Its composition is very similar to two other 1624 works, one still in Palermo and the other in the Menil Collection. All three show the influence of Pietro Novelli, then also in the city.

== History ==
It appeared in the "passage to the king's pew" in Madrid's Palacio Real according to the 1772 inventory, moving to "the prince's dressing room" by 1776, where it still was in 1789. Looted by Joseph Bonaparte, it was found in his abandoned carriage at the Battle of Vitoria in 1813 by the Duke of Wellington, to whom it was formally granted three years later by Ferdinand VII

=== Exhibition ===
It was loaned to the Dulwich Picture Gallery in 2011-2012 for display with the other four Saint Rosalia works.

== See also ==
- List of paintings by Anthony van Dyck
