= Francisco Meneses Osorio =

Francisco Meneses Osorio (1630–1705) was a Spanish painter.

Osorio was born in Seville, and is thought to have died there. Very little is known of his life. He was a pupil, imitator, and friend of Murillo, and may have painted some of the works attributed to him; the two worked together in the Capuchin church in Cádiz. He was also a close acquaintance of Juan Garzon, with whom he worked, and was at one time secretary and later on president of the Academy of Sevillo.

While Osorio had a high reputation as a painter during his life, there has since been controversy about how much of his work was simply imitation of Murillo.

His principal work was painted for the church of Saint Martin at Madrid, and represents the Prophet Elijah. There are pictures by him in the museums in Cádiz and Seville, the latter dealing with the Order of St. Francis. A work representing St. Catherine, which is preserved in Cádiz, is said to have had a special devotion for St. Philip Neri, and to have been buried in the church dedicated to that saint.
