= Saint Rosalia Crowned by Angels (Palermo) =

Painting by Anthony van Dyck

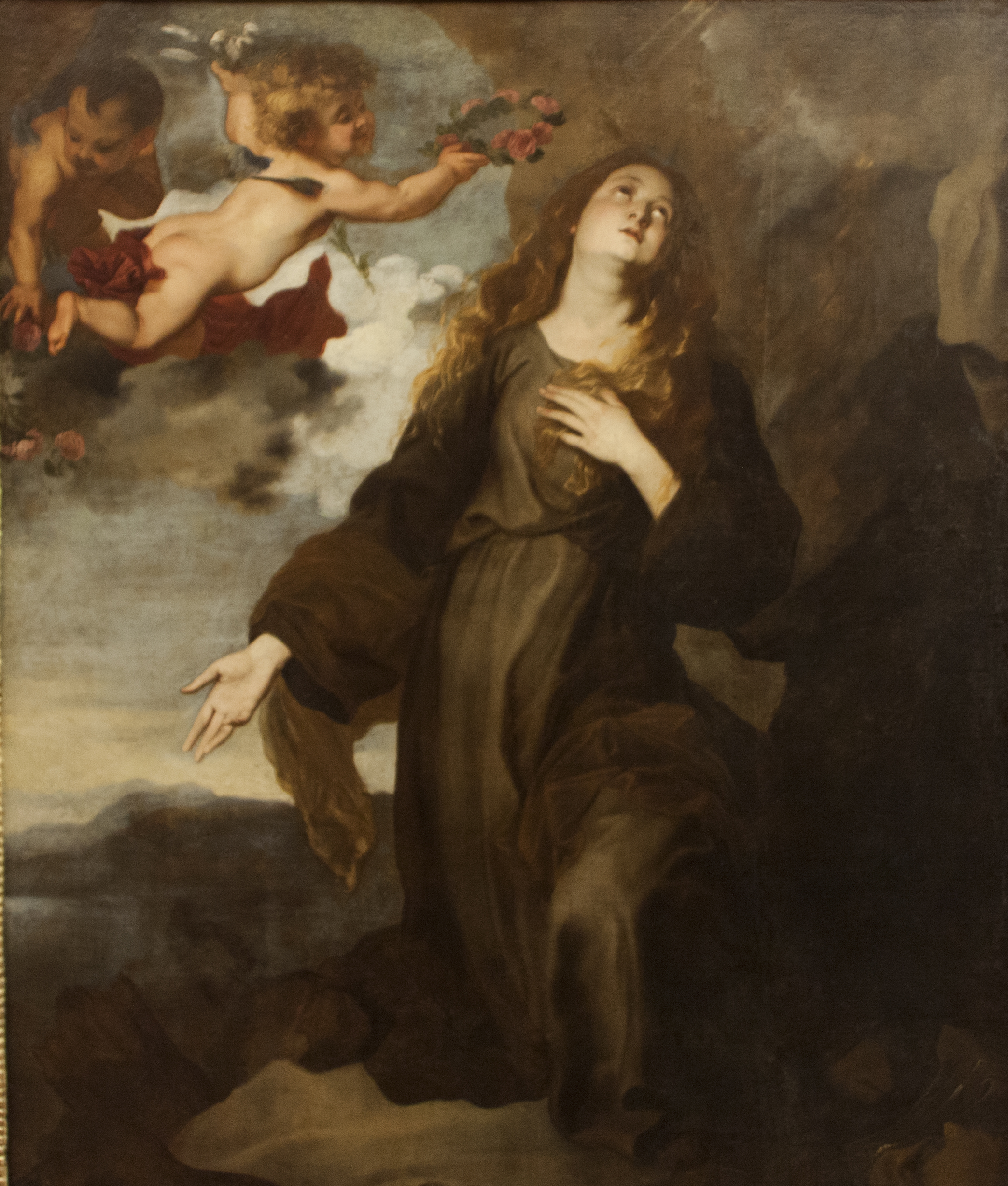
Saint Rosalia Crowned by Angels (c. 1624) by Anthony van Dyck

Saint Rosalia Crowned by Angels is an oil on canvas painting by the studio of Anthony van Dyck, created c. 1624, one of several works showing the saint produced whilst van Dyck was quarantined in Palermo, Sicily due to a plague. It is now in the Galleria Regionale del Palazzo Abatellis in Palermo, where in 2015 it was displayed alongside Saint Rosalie Interceding, loaned from the Metropolitan Museum of Art.

It is thought to be a studio version of the autograph work now in Houston Their composition is very similar to that of two other 1624 works now in the Wellington Collection at Apsley House in London and the Menil Collection. They all show the influence of Pietro Novelli, then also in the city.

== See also ==
- List of paintings by Anthony van Dyck
