= Lorenzo Tinti =

Italian painter

Lorenzo Tinti (1626–1672) was an Italian painter and engraver of the Baroque period. He was born in Bologna and was a pupil of Giovanni Andrea Sirani, and painted altar-pieces for the churches in Bologna, among them Scourging of Christ for the church of the Madonna del Piombo; and the Virgin and Child with several Saints for Santa Tecla, now demolished. Tinti etched several plates after painters of the Bolognese school, including a Holy Family and an Allegory after Elisabetta Sirani; the rest are portraits and frontispieces to books.
