= Nanjing Museum =

History and art museum in Nanjing, China

- 南京博物院
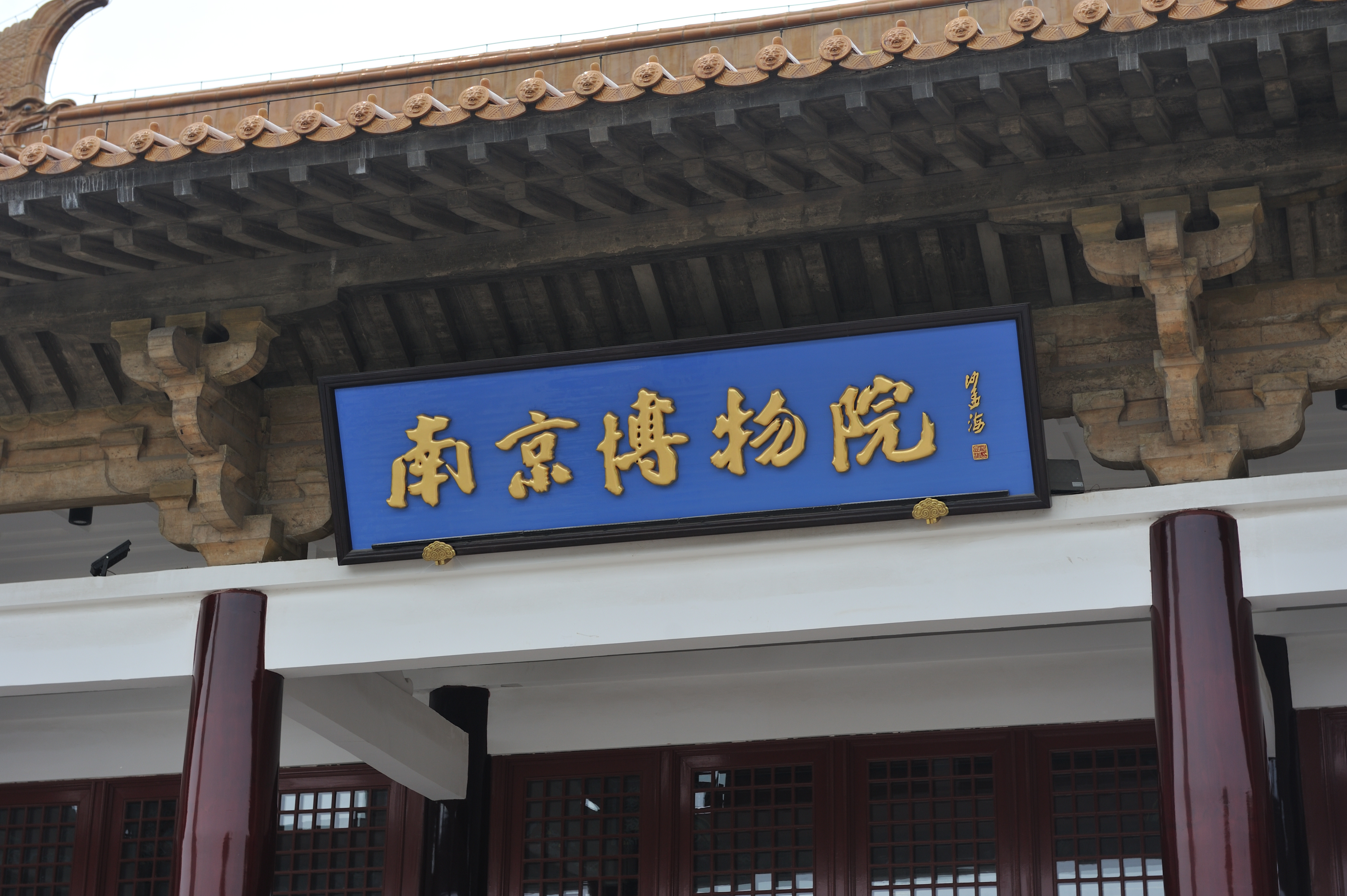
- Established: 1933
- Location: Nanjing, China
- Coordinates: 32°02′33″N 118°49′10″E
- Type: History museum, art museum
- Collection size: 400,000
- Owner: Jiangsu Provincial People's Government
- Public transit access: Minggugong station 2
- Website: www.njmuseum.com

The Nanjing Museum (Chinese: 南京博物院; pinyin: Nánjīng Bówùyuàn) is a provincial public museum in Nanjing, Jiangsu, China. It is owned by the Jiangsu Provincial People's Government and operated by the Jiangsu Provincial Department of Culture and Tourism.

With an area of 70,000 square metres (17 acres), the museum is one of the largest museums in China, with over 400,000 items in its permanent collection. Especially notable is the museum's enormous collections of Ming and Qing imperial porcelain, which is among the largest in the world.

== History ==
The Nanjing Museum was one of the first museums established in China. The predecessor of the Nanjing Museum was the preparatory department of the National Central Museum, which was established in 1933. The museum took over 12.9 hectares (32 acres) in the Half Hill Garden of Zhongshan Gate. Cai Yuanpei, the first preparatory president of the council of the museum, proposed building three major halls, named "Humanity," "Craft" and "Nature". Because of China's political instability in the 1930s, only the Humanity Hall was built. During the Japanese invasion, part of its collections were transferred to Southwest China, and in the end moved to the National Palace Museum in Taipei when the Kuomintang lost the Chinese Civil War. The historian Fu Sinian and anthropologist and archaeologist Li Ji were once preparatory presidents, and the archaeologist and museologist Zeng Zhaoyu was the first female president and also a founder of Nanjing Museum. In 1999 and 2009, extensions were built to the museum.

== Buildings ==
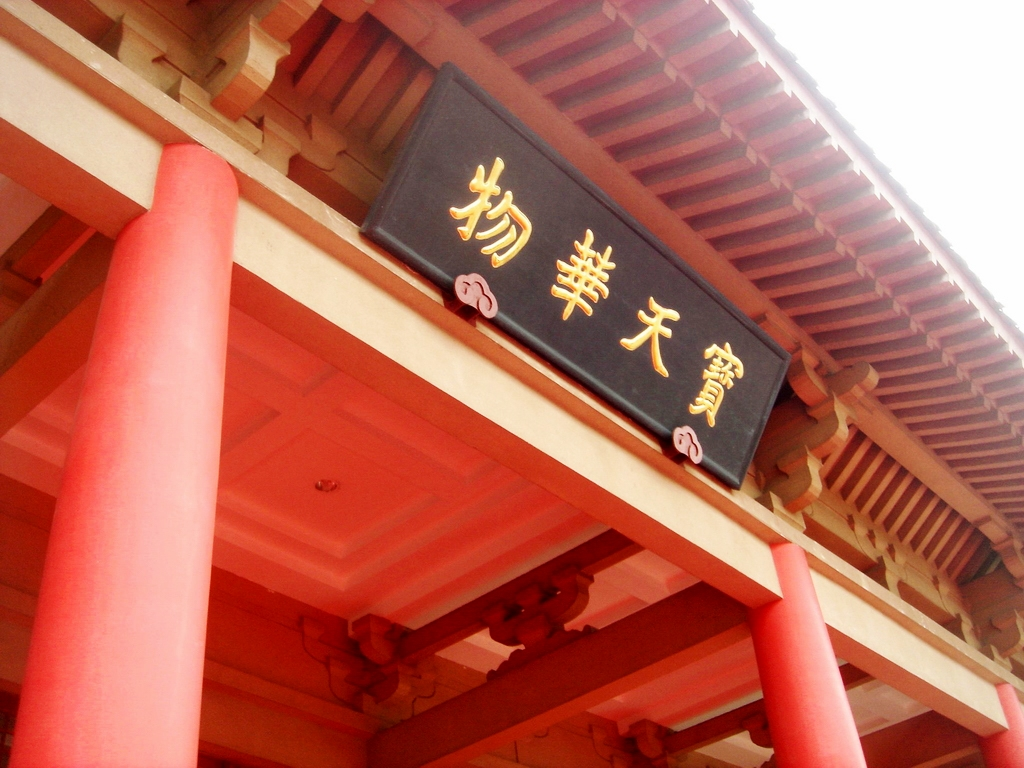
Detail of the entrance gate

The main building was designed by Liang Sicheng in the 1930s combining Chinese and Western architectural styles. The front section is structure of traditional style and features a golden tiled roof. In the back is a Western-style flat-roof structure. Added in the 1990s to the west of the main building is an art hall which references Chinese architecture of the first half of the 20th century.

== Exhibition halls ==
The Nanjing Museum has several main exhibition halls:

- The Historical Exhibition Hall shows the history of Jiangsu Province from prehistoric times to the Qing dynasty. It includes Neolithic pottery and tools, Shang and Zhou bronze vessels, Han lacquerware and jade burial suits, Tang sancai ceramics, and porcelain from the Ming and Qing dynasties.
- The Art Exhibition Hall displays Chinese painting, calligraphy, sculpture, jade, bronze, and ceramics, showing how artistic styles developed over time.
- The Republic of China Hall covers the period from 1912 to 1949, when Nanjing was the capital. It includes documents, photographs, clothing, and everyday objects from that time.
- The Intangible Cultural Heritage Hall presents traditional crafts and performing arts from Jiangsu Province, including Nanjing Cloud Brocade and paper-cutting.
- The Digital Hall uses multimedia and interactive technology to explain history and culture.
- The Special Exhibition Hall hosts temporary exhibitions on specific themes or new discoveries.

== Gallery ==
=== Paintings ===
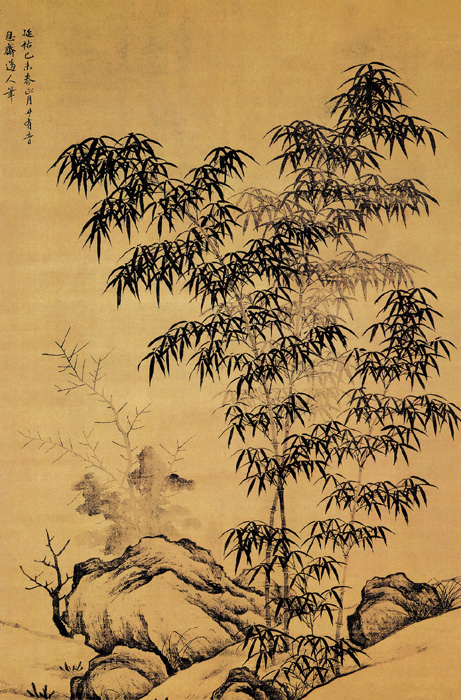
Giant Bamboos and Stones by Li Kan (1245–1320), 13th century

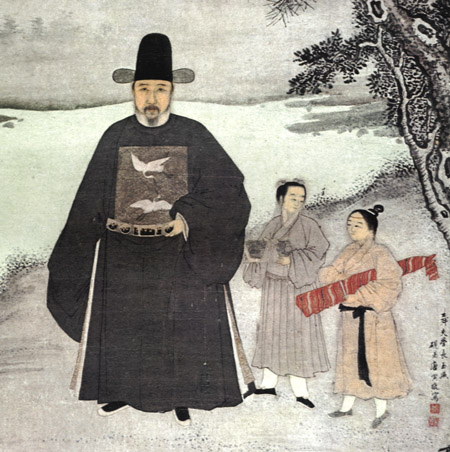
A Ming portrait of the official Jiang Shunfu, late 15th century

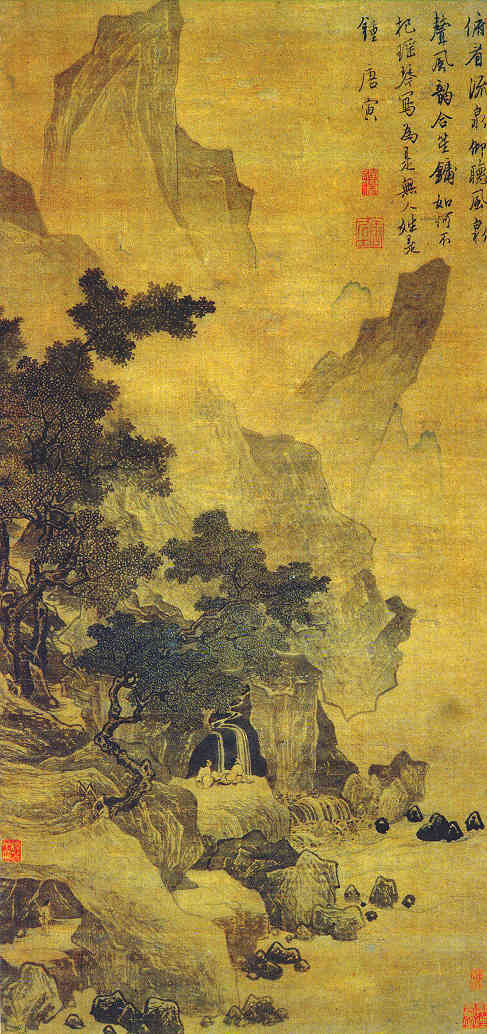
Watching the Spring and Listening to the Wind by Tang Yin (1470–1524), early 16th century

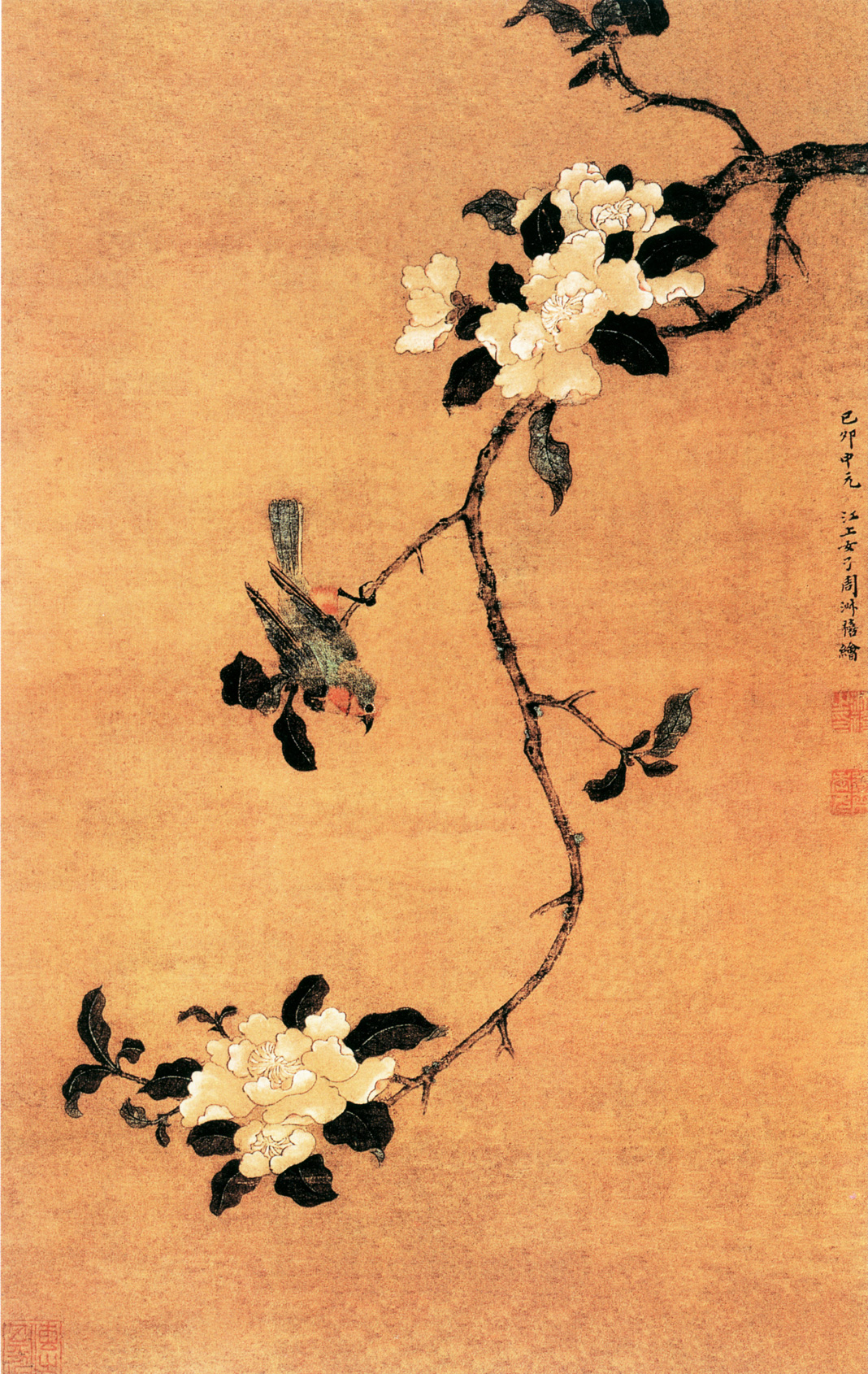
Camellia and a Lonely Bird by Zhou Shuxi (1624–1705)

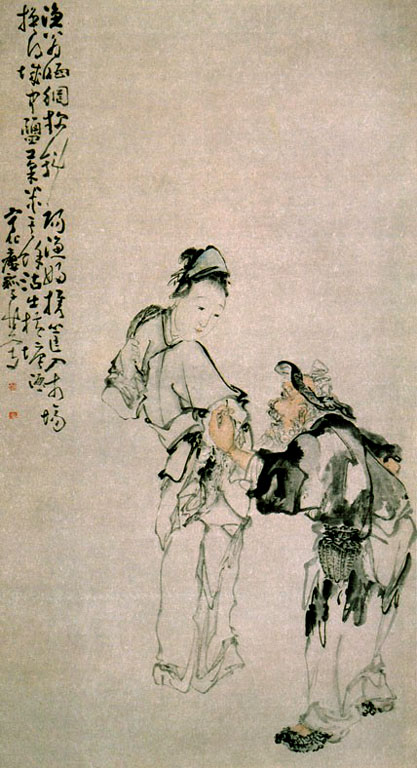
Fisherman and Fisherwoman by Huang Shen (1687–1772)

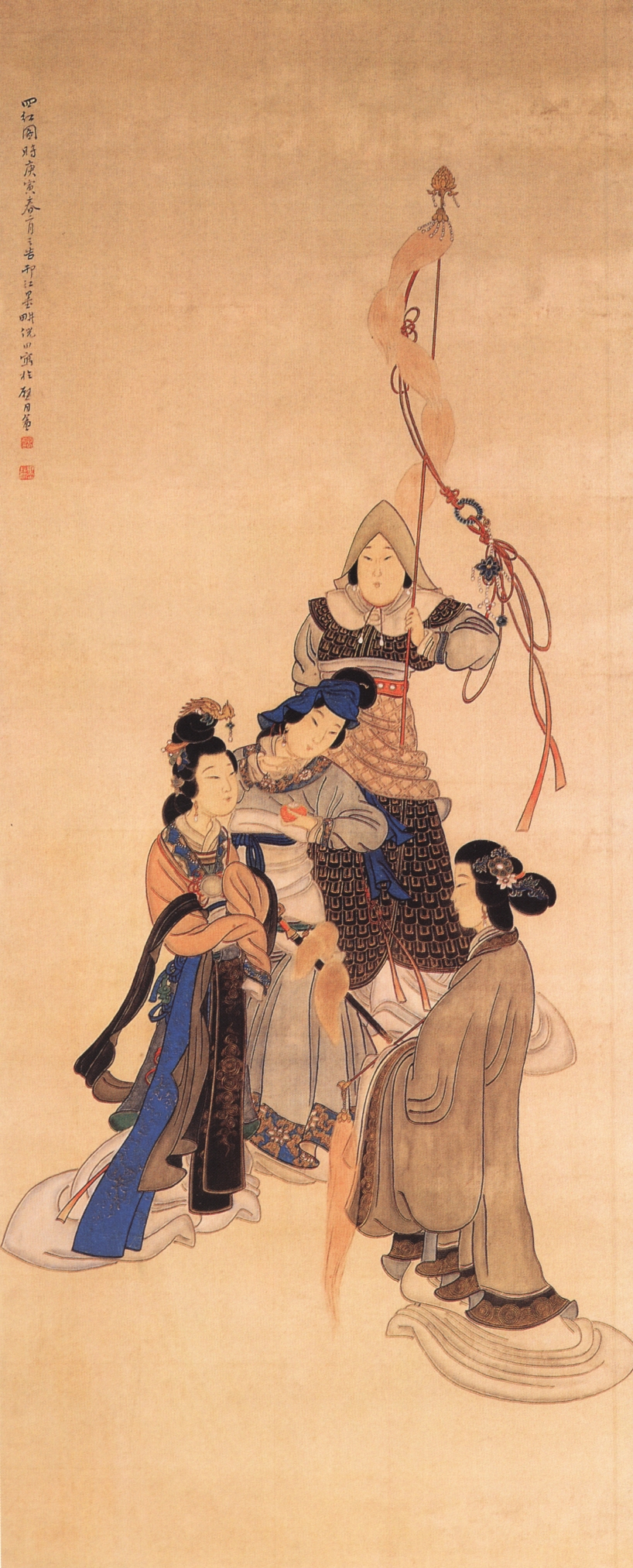
Four Beauties by Ni Tian (1855–1919)

=== Lacquer ===
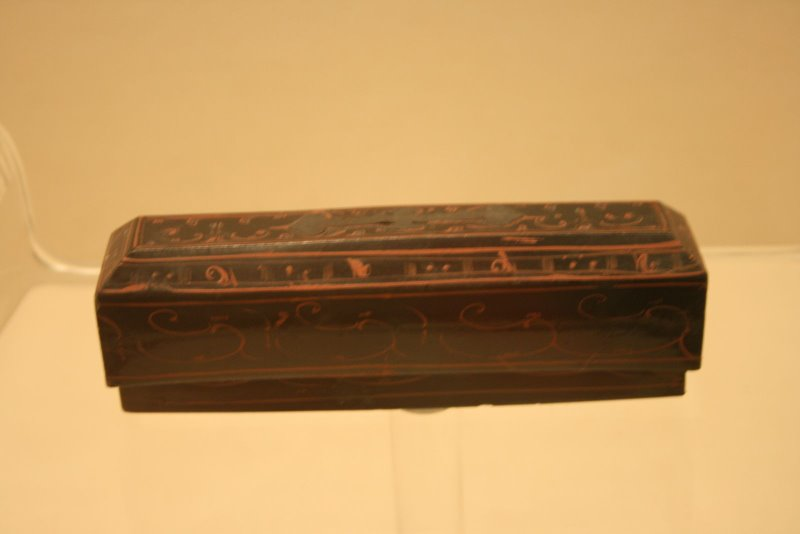
A Western Han (202 BC - 9 AD) red-and-black rectangular lacquerware box

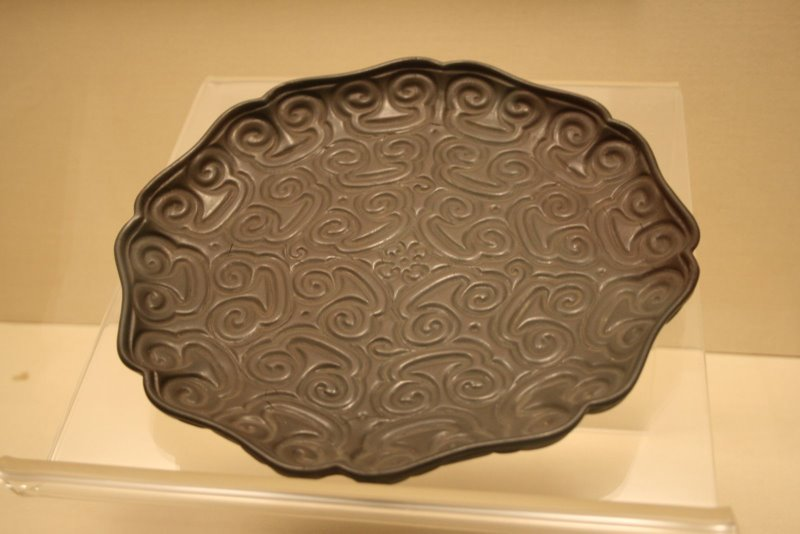
A Ming Dynasty (1368–1644) black lacquerware plate

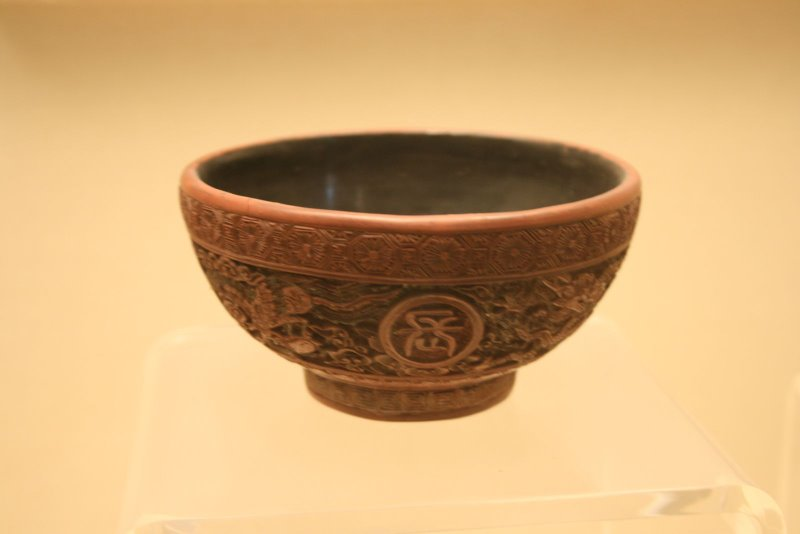
A Ming red lacquered bowl

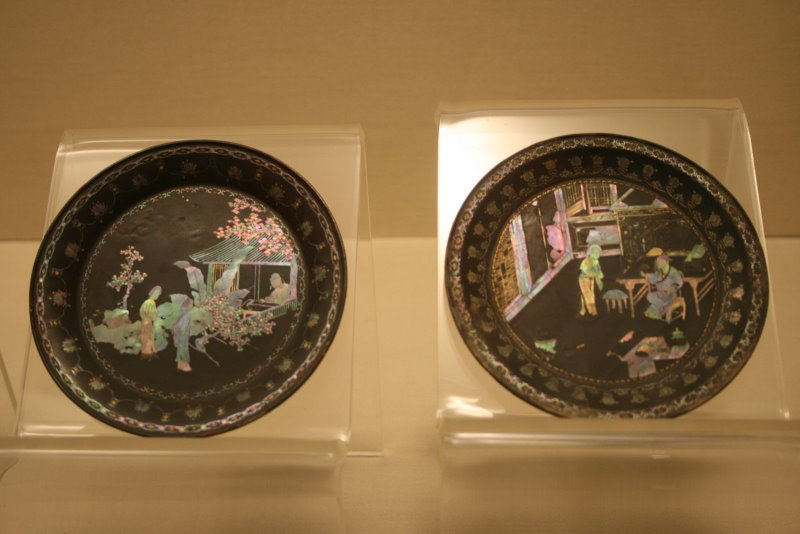
A pair of Ming Dynasty black lacquerware plates with mother-of-pearl inlaid designs of domestic scenes.

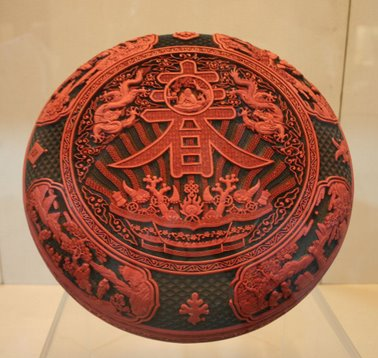
A Qing red lacquerware box with the Chinese character for "spring" inscribed on the front, dated to the Qianlong Emperor's reign (1736–1795)

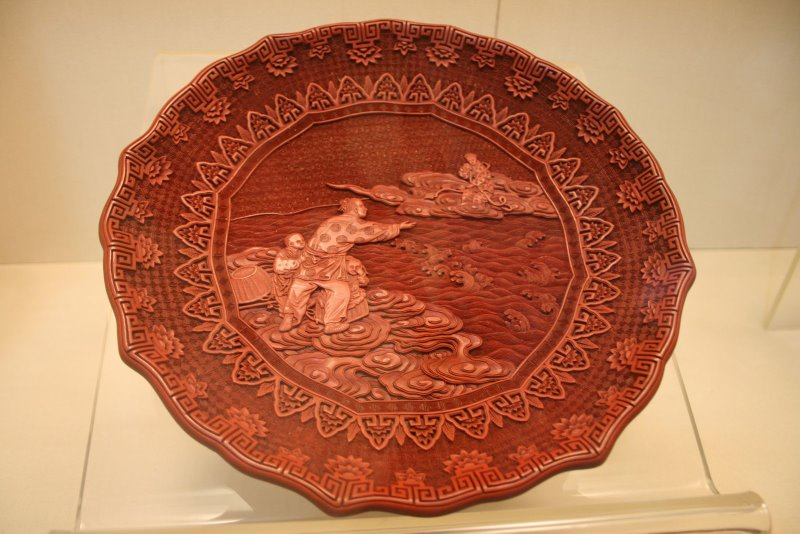
A red lacquerware plate, dated to the Qianlong Emperor's reign

=== Ceramics ===
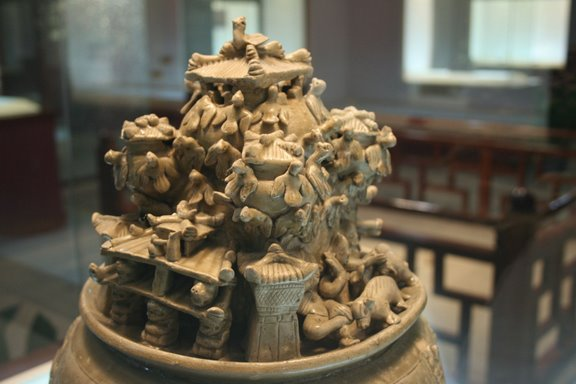
A Western Jin Dynasty (265–316 AD) celadon ceramic jar with human figures, animals, and architecture.

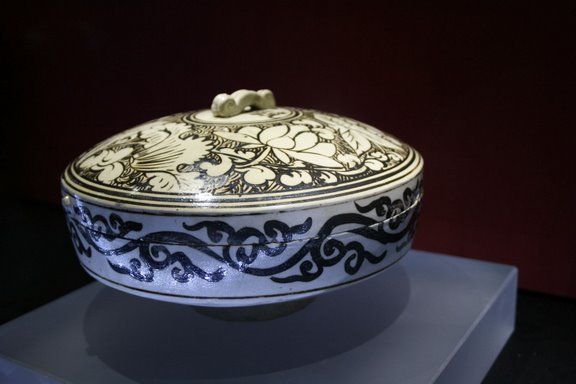
A Song Dynasty (960–1279 AD) porcelain box with a flower design

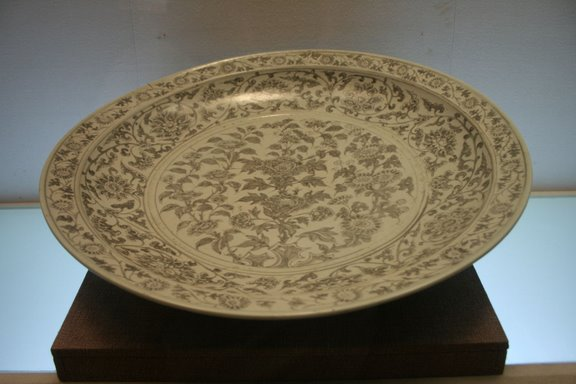
A Ming Dynasty (1368–1644 AD) porcelain dish from the reign of the Hongwu Emperor (1368–1398 AD)

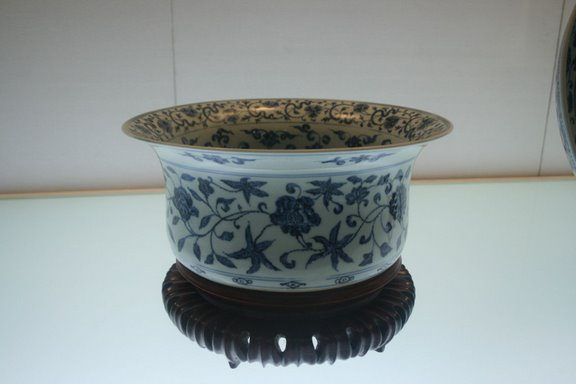
A Ming blue-and-white porcelain vase from the reign of the Yongle Emperor (1402–1424 AD)

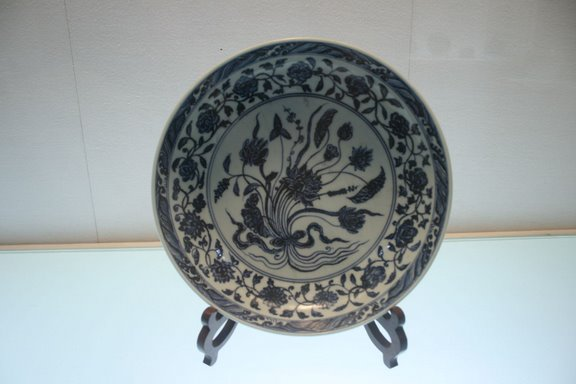
A Ming blue-and-white porcelain dish from the reign of the Xuande Emperor (1425–1435 AD)

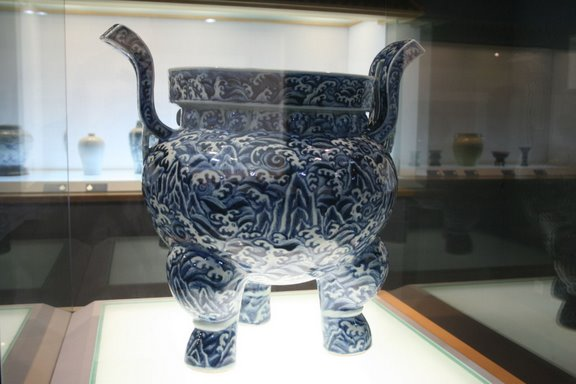
A Ming blue-and-white porcelain ding vessel from the reign of the Xuande Emperor (1425–1435 AD).

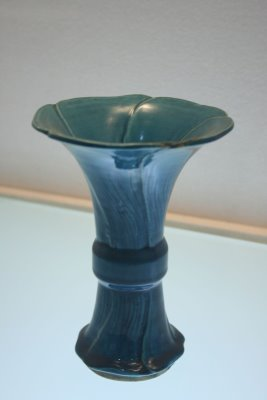
A Ming porcelain vase from the reign of the Zhengde Emperor (1505–1521 AD).

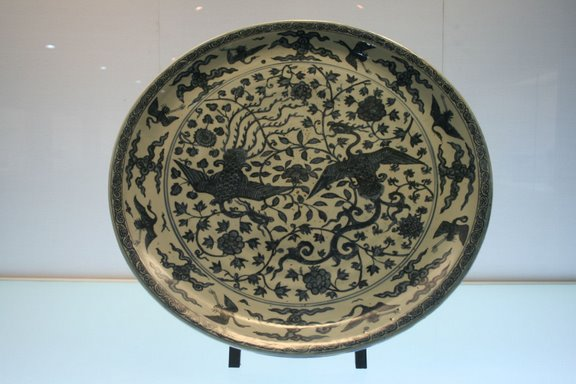
A Ming blue-and-white porcelain dish from the reign of the Jiajing Emperor (1521–1567 AD)

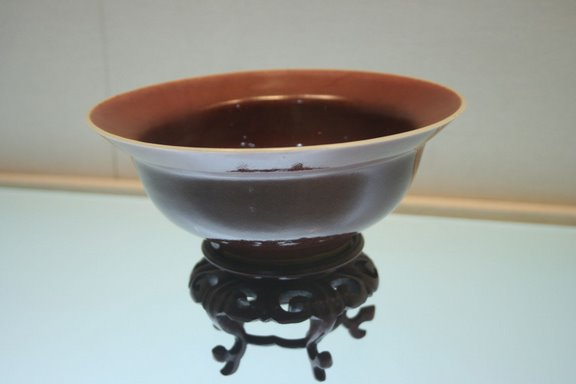
A Ming porcelain bowl from the reign of the Wanli Emperor (1572–1620 AD).

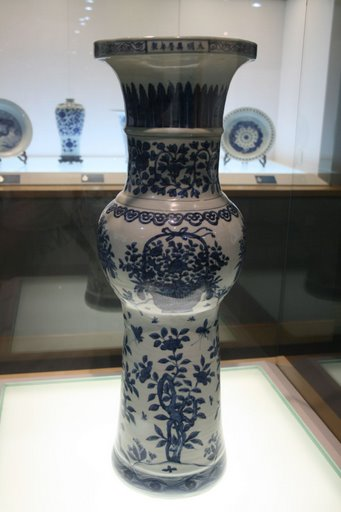
A Ming blue-and-white porcelain vase from the reign of the Wanli Emperor (1572–1620 AD)

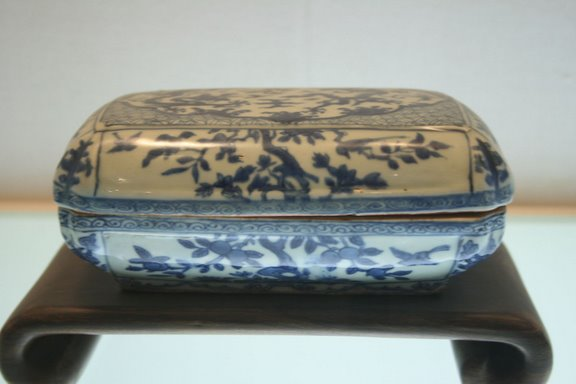
A Ming blue-and-white porcelain box from the reign of the Wanli Emperor (1572–1620 AD)

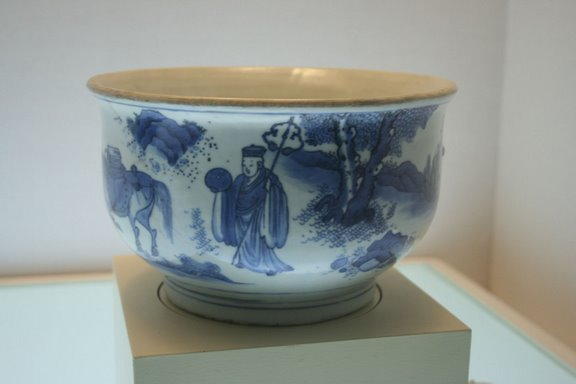
A Ming blue-and-white porcelain bowl from the reign of the Chongzhen Emperor (1627–1644 AD)

== See also ==
- Nanjing Municipal Museum
- List of museums in China
