= Zhou Shuxi =

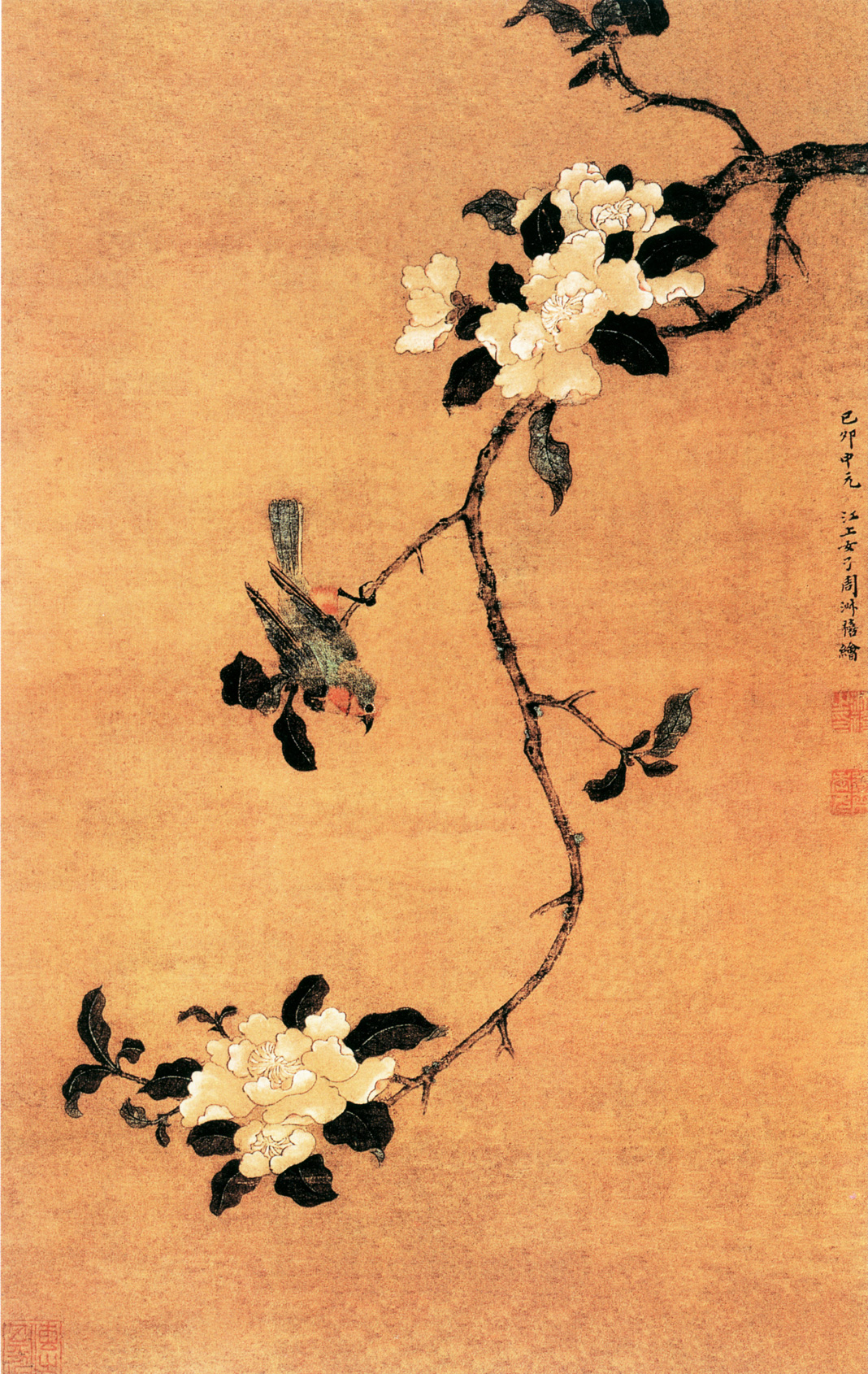
Camellia and a Lonely Bird (茶花幽禽图), Zhou Shuxi, Nanjing Museum

Zhou Shuxi (Chinese: 周淑禧; pinyin: Zhōu Shūxǐ; Wade–Giles: Chou Shu-hsi; 1624–1705) was a female Chinese painter in Qing Dynasty. She was a native of Jiangyin, Jiangsu Province, and the second daughter of Zhou Rongqi. Her sobriquet was 'Lady on the River' (Chinese: 江上女士; pinyin: Jiāngshang nǚshì).

Zhou learned painting along with her sister Zhou Shuhu from her father. Of their work Jiang Shaoshu wrote in Wusheng Shi Shi (History of Wordless Poetry) that they were "celebrated for their superb painting skills and good at painting flowers, insects and birds. In their works, lines are so thin and cursive that they look like silk produced by silkworm in spring while colors are bright and spirit is vivid."

Jiang continued in describing some of Zhou's other works: "She was also skilled in painting Buddha statues with solemn and dignified bearing and sometimes painted horses of other regions with exquisite dots and washes and meticulous composition."

Married Huang of her hometown.
