= The Betrayal of Christ =

The Betrayal of Christ may refer to:

- The Betrayal of Christ (van Dyck, Madrid)
- The Betrayal of Christ (van Dyck, Bristol)
- The Betrayal of Christ (van Dyck, Minneapolis)
