= Cupid and Psyche (van Dyck) =

Painting by Anthony van Dyck

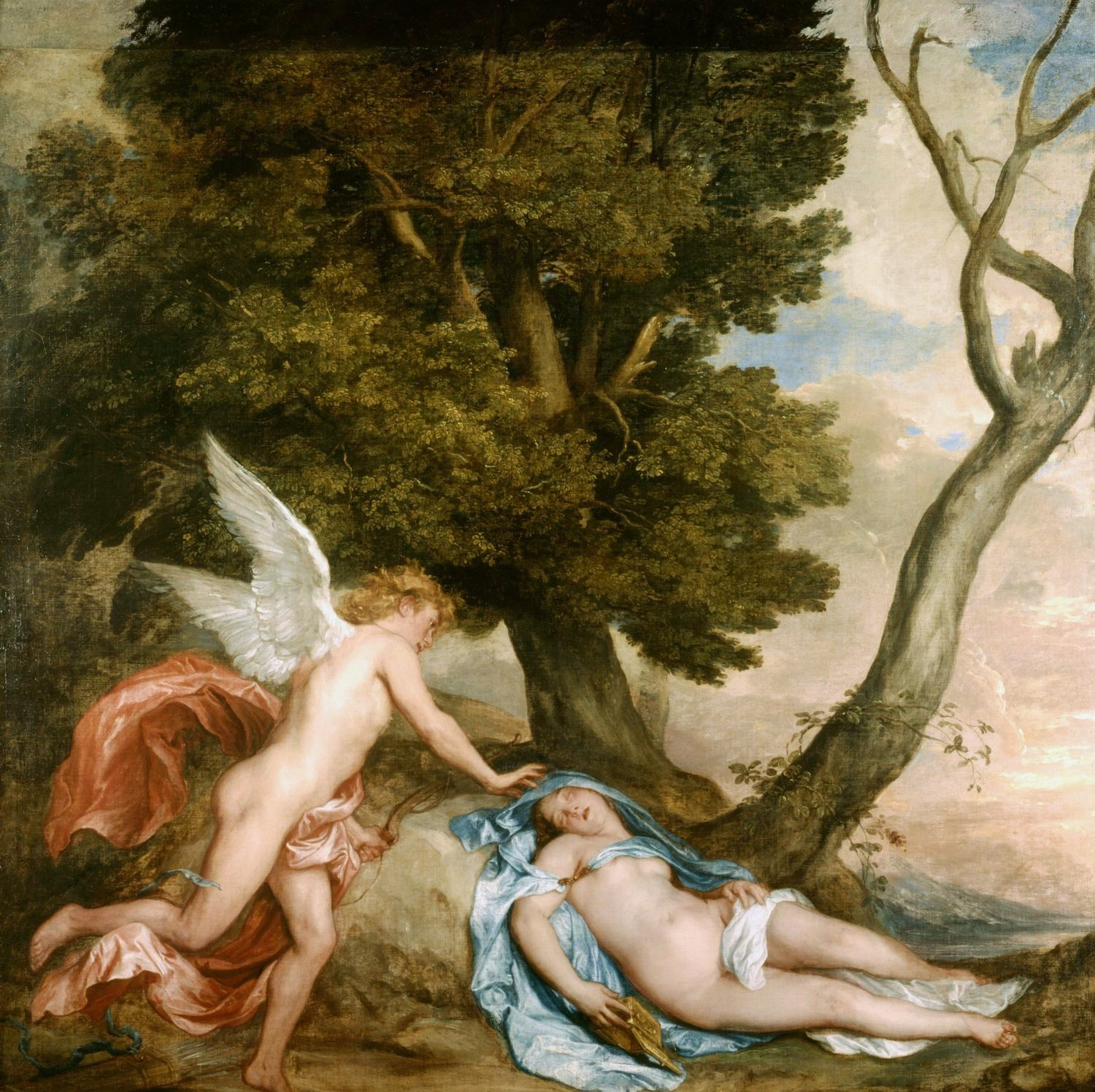

Cupid and Psyche is an oil on canvas painting by Anthony van Dyck. It is now in the British Royal Collection and shown in Kensington Palace.

One of the last works in van Dyck's oeuvre, it shows a marked influence of Titian and dates from his time as a court artist to Charles I of England. It is his sole surviving mythological painting from that period and possibly comes from a series of paintings on the Cupid and Psyche theme ordered for the Queen's House at Greenwich; other artists involved in the series included Jacob Jordaens and van Dyck's old tutor Peter Paul Rubens. That project was never completed, which is one possible explanation why the painting has no frame and is relatively unfinished. This would date it to 1638–1640. A second alternative is that it was produced for the celebrations of Princess Mary's marriage to William II of Orange in 1641. The figure of Psyche may have been based on van Dyck's mistress Margaret Lemon.

== See also ==
- List of paintings by Anthony van Dyck

== Sources ==
- Gian Pietro Bellori, Vite de' pittori, scultori e architecti moderni, Torino, Einaudi, 1976.
- Didier Bodart, Van Dyck, Prato, Giunti, 1997.
- Christopher Brown, Van Dyck 1599–1641, Milano, RCS Libri, 1999, ISBN 88-17-86060-3.
- Justus Müller Hofstede, Van Dyck, Milano, Rizzoli/Skira, 2004.
- Stefano Zuffi, Il Barocco, Verona, Mondadori, 2004.
