= Madonna and Child (van Dyck) =

Painting by Anthony van Dyck

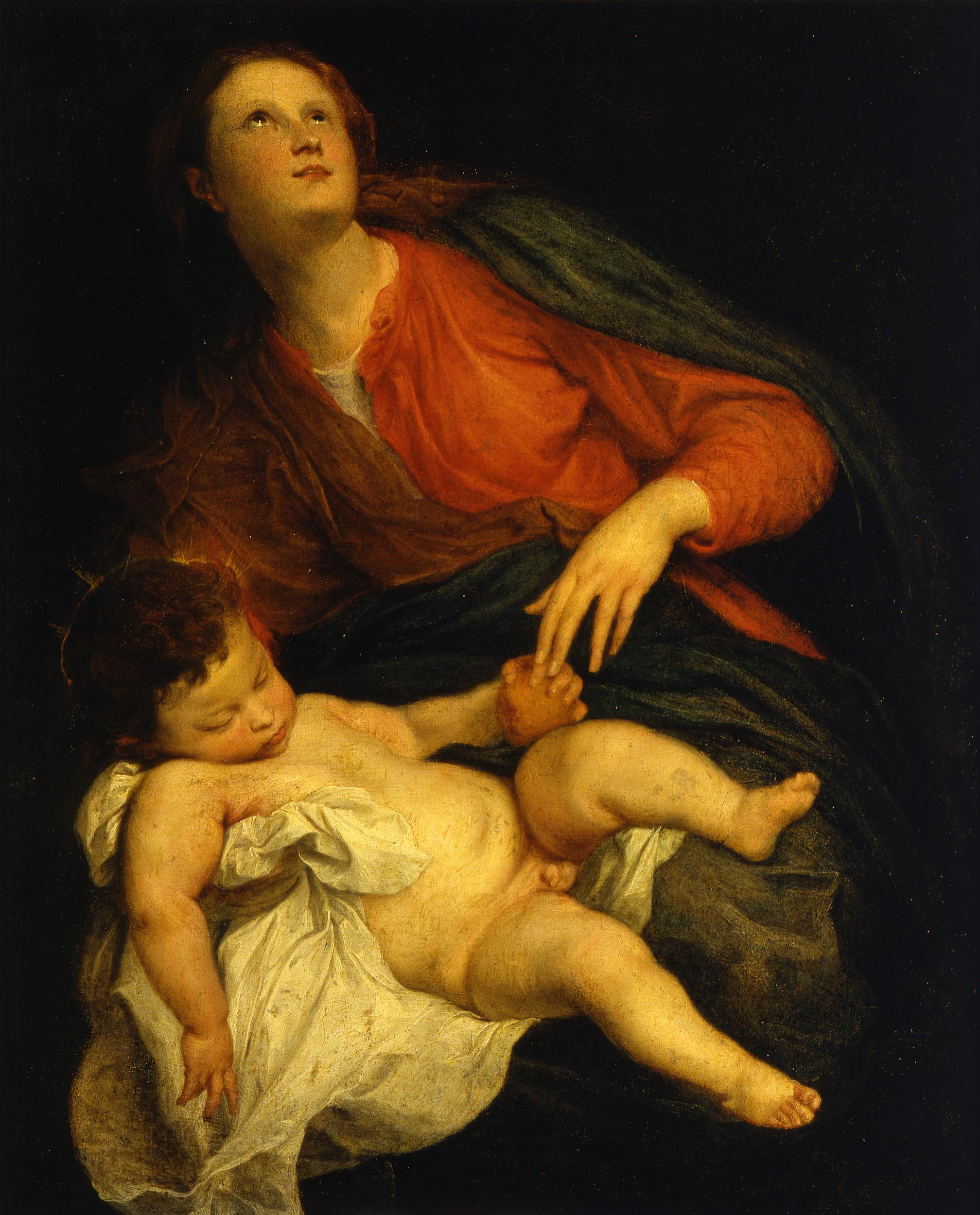
- Artist: Anthony van Dyck
- Year: c. 1621–1627
- Medium: oil on canvas
- Dimensions: 62.5 cm × 52.5 cm (24.6 in × 20.7 in)
- Location: Galleria nazionale di Parma, Parma

Madonna and Child is a 1621–1627 painting by Anthony van Dyck, now in the Galleria nazionale di Parma.

== Description ==
Madonna and Child, representing "the blessed Virgin holding the sleeping Baby Jesus in her lap," is part of a series of Madonna paintings by Anthony van Dyck. The series was made during his Italian period between 1621 and 1625 according to this Notebook of Italian Drawings. The works in this series are mostly three-quarters portraits conducted in a c. 1550–1570 Titianesque style in their iconography and use of color. The elegant gestures and dynamic movement of the elongated figure of Marie contrasts with her very human attachment to the Baby Jesus. In a deep sleep, he still holds the hand of his mother.

Madonna and Child is often compared to other works in Van Dyck's Palermo period, like the Madonna col Bambino di Palermo at the Galleria Nazional di Sicilia and the Saint Rosalie Interceding for the Plague–Stricken of Palermo at the Metropolitan Museum of Art. Venetian art, particularly Titian's, was a great inspiration for Van Dyck, who admired both its creative subjects and display of technical skill. Van Dyck had studied the works of Titian often during his two months in Venice, after his breaks in Genoa and Rome.

The dating of the work, still uncertain, varies from 1621 to 1625, according to Larsen. Limentani Virdis, however, believes the work was made c. 1627 based on the interpretative liberties that Van Dyck took from the art of Titian to incorporate Baroque elements and the influence of Pieter Paul Rubens.

== History ==
The painting entered the Galleria nazionale di Parma in 1820, after it was bought by Marie Louise from the collection of Marianna Galli Baldrighi. The attribution of the work, already determined as a Van Dyck by the time it entered the museum, has not been placed in doubt by any following studies.

== See also ==
- List of paintings by Anthony van Dyck

== Bibliography ==
- G. Allegri Tassoni, "La Madonna col Bambino dormiente di A. van Dyck”, in AP, I, 1981, pp. 51–54.
- S.J. Barnes, Van Dyck in Italy: 1621–1628, New York University, New York, 1986
- Van Dyck, Riflessi italiani; Catalogo della mostra a Palazzo Reale, a cura di Maria Grazia Bernardini, Milano, 2004
- E. Larsen, Apparato Critico: l’Opera completa di van Dyck, Classici dell’Arte Rizzoli, Milano, 1980
- E. Larsen, Van Dyck. The paintings, Freren, 1988
