= The Resurrection (van Dyck) =

Painting by Anthony van Dyck

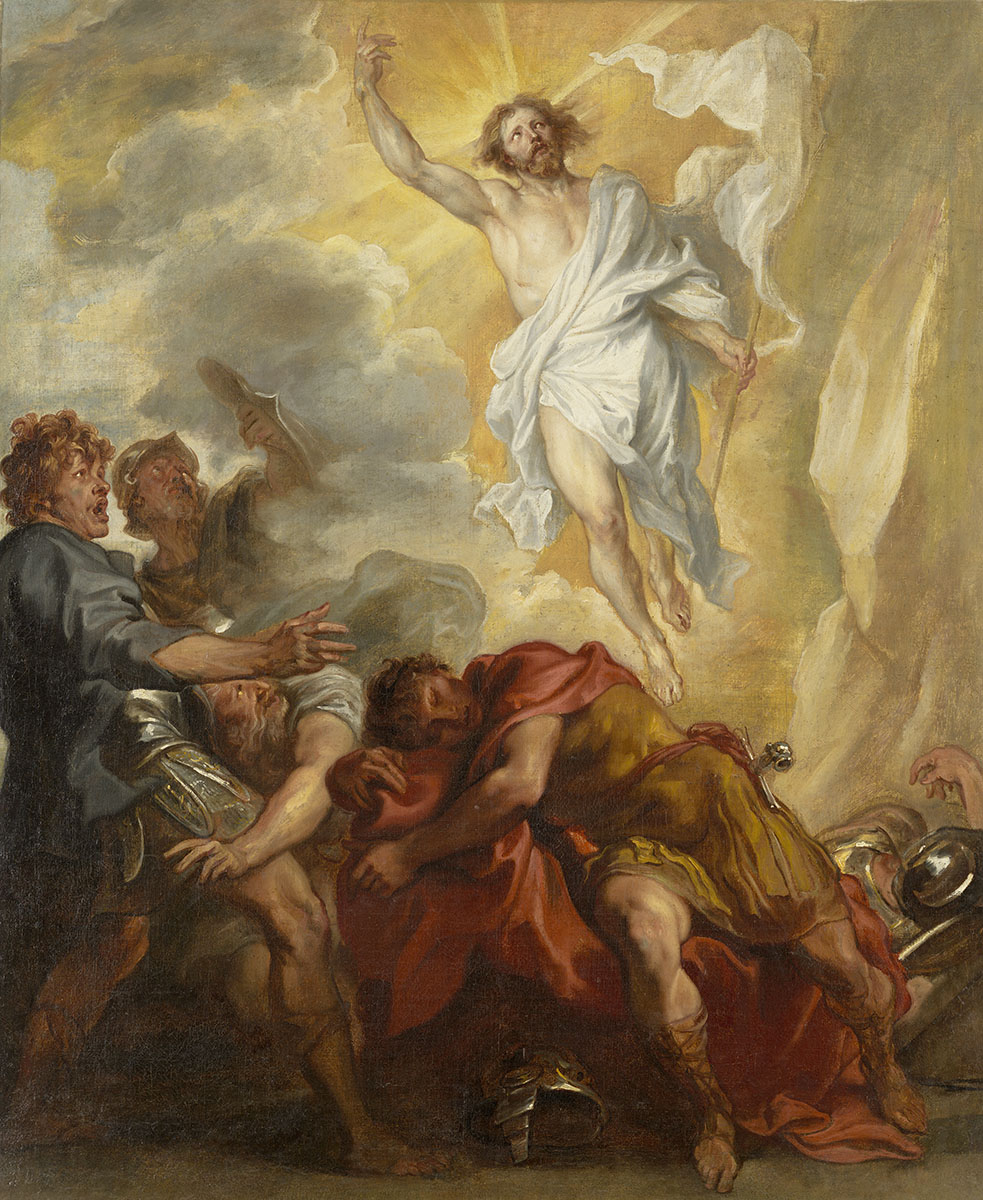
The Resurrection (1631-1632) by Anthony van Dyck

The Resurrection is an oil on canvas painting completed in 1631 - 1632 by Anthony van Dyck, now in the Wadsworth Atheneum, in Hartford, Connecticut. Experts date the painting to Van Dyck's second Antwerp period, around 1627‐32.

The painting depicts the emergence of Christ from the tomb. Dressed in white with red hair, from his head emerge bright rays of light. Christ points upward to heaven with his right hand, while his left arm holds a staff, he hovers in the air with right leg stepping forward.

The huddling five soldiers below are all in darker tones and shadows. They sport a variety of emotions and action, fear and astonishment by the guards on the left corner and along a diagonal to the right are soldiers still asleep.

The gospel of Matthew states:

There was a violent earthquake, for an angel of the Lord came down from heaven and, going to the tomb, rolled back the stone and sat on it. His appearance was like lightning, and his clothes were white as snow. The guards were so afraid of him that they shook and became like dead men.

Later the rabbinical authorities, according to Matthew, bribed the guards to concoct a story that Jesus' body had been pilfered by his disciples while the soldiers slept.

== See also ==
- List of paintings by Anthony van Dyck
