= The Three Eldest Children of Charles I (Royal Collection) =

Painting my Anthony van Dyck

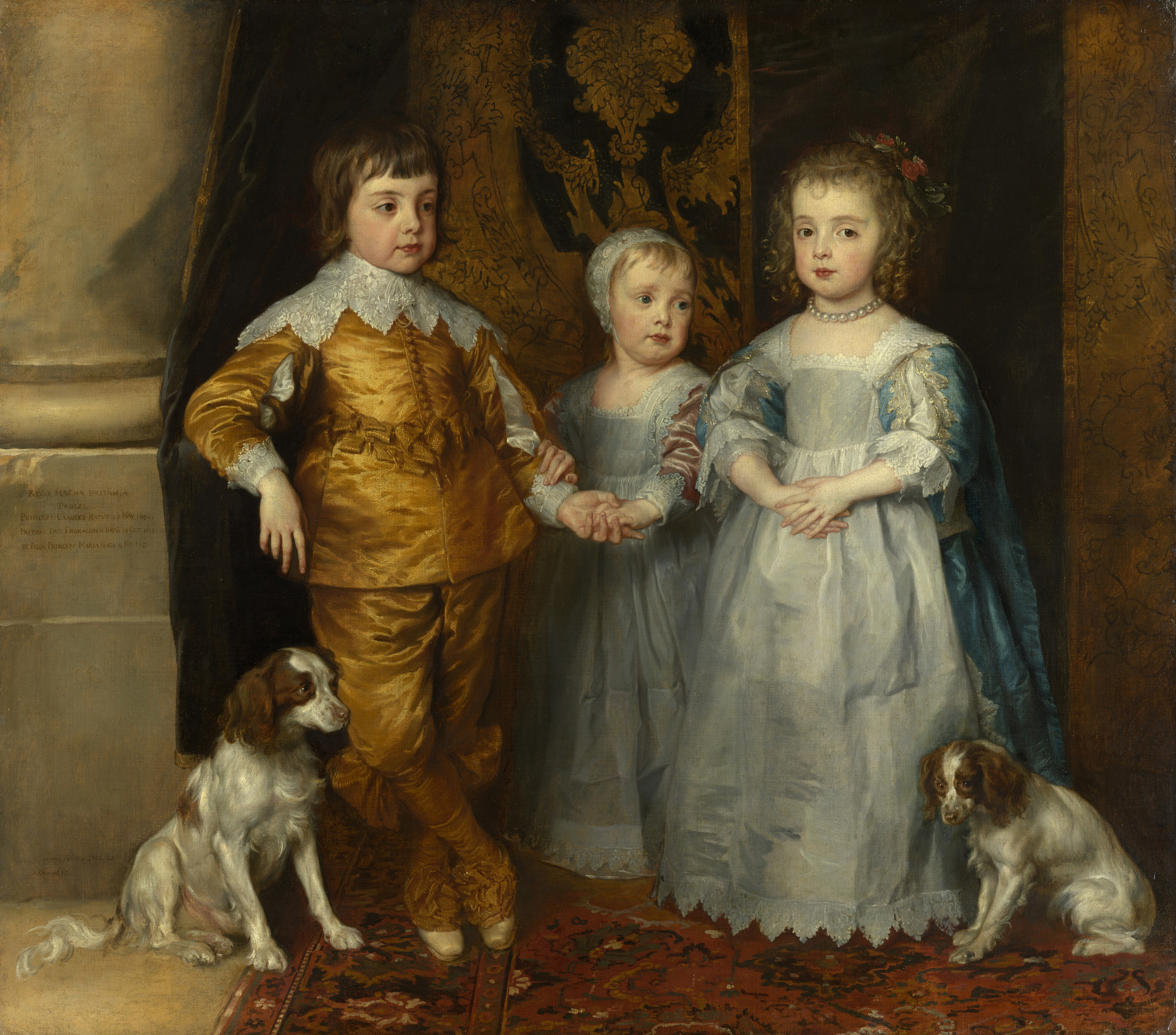

The Three Eldest Children of Charles I is an oil painting on canvas by Anthony van Dyck, produced between November 1635 and March 1636 and still in the Royal Collection. Numerous studio copies were made of this painting.

It shows Charles II, Mary and James II, the three eldest children of Charles I and his wife Henrietta Maria of France, with two King Charles Spaniels.

== Background ==
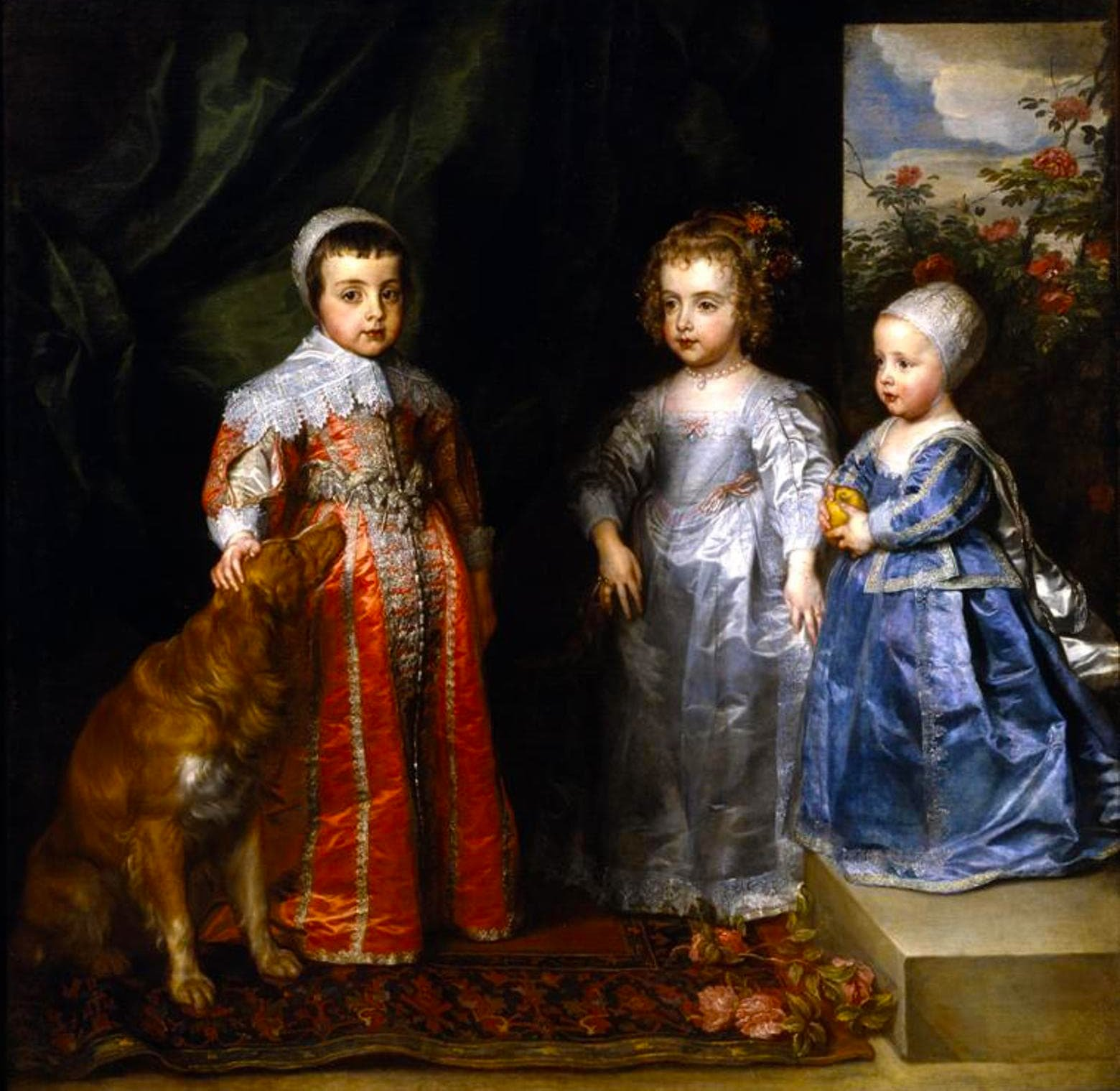
Earlier 1635 painting with both Prince Charles and Prince James wearing skirts

In 1635 Van Dyck had painted a portrait of the same three children, which was intended to be sent to the Queen's sister Christina, in exchange for portraits of the Duchess's children. However, the King was angry with Van Dyck for showing Prince Charles wearing skirts, worn only by younger children, so the artist painted a second group portrait of the same three children, this time with Prince Charles wearing the more grown-up breeches (trousers).

== Derivative works ==
Numerous studio copies were made of this painting, including copies now in Dresden and Wilton House.

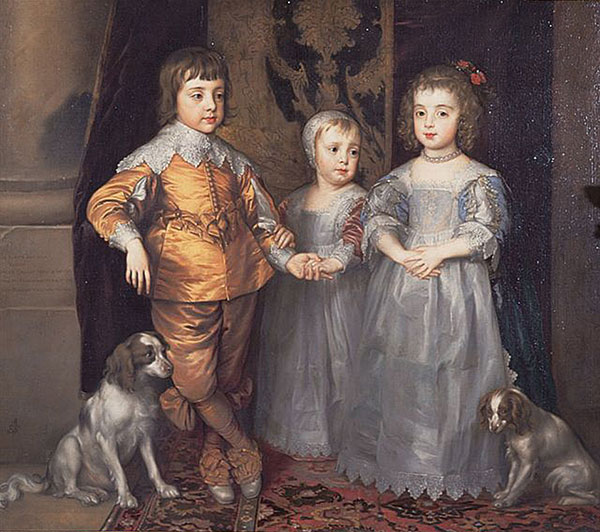
Wilton House copy

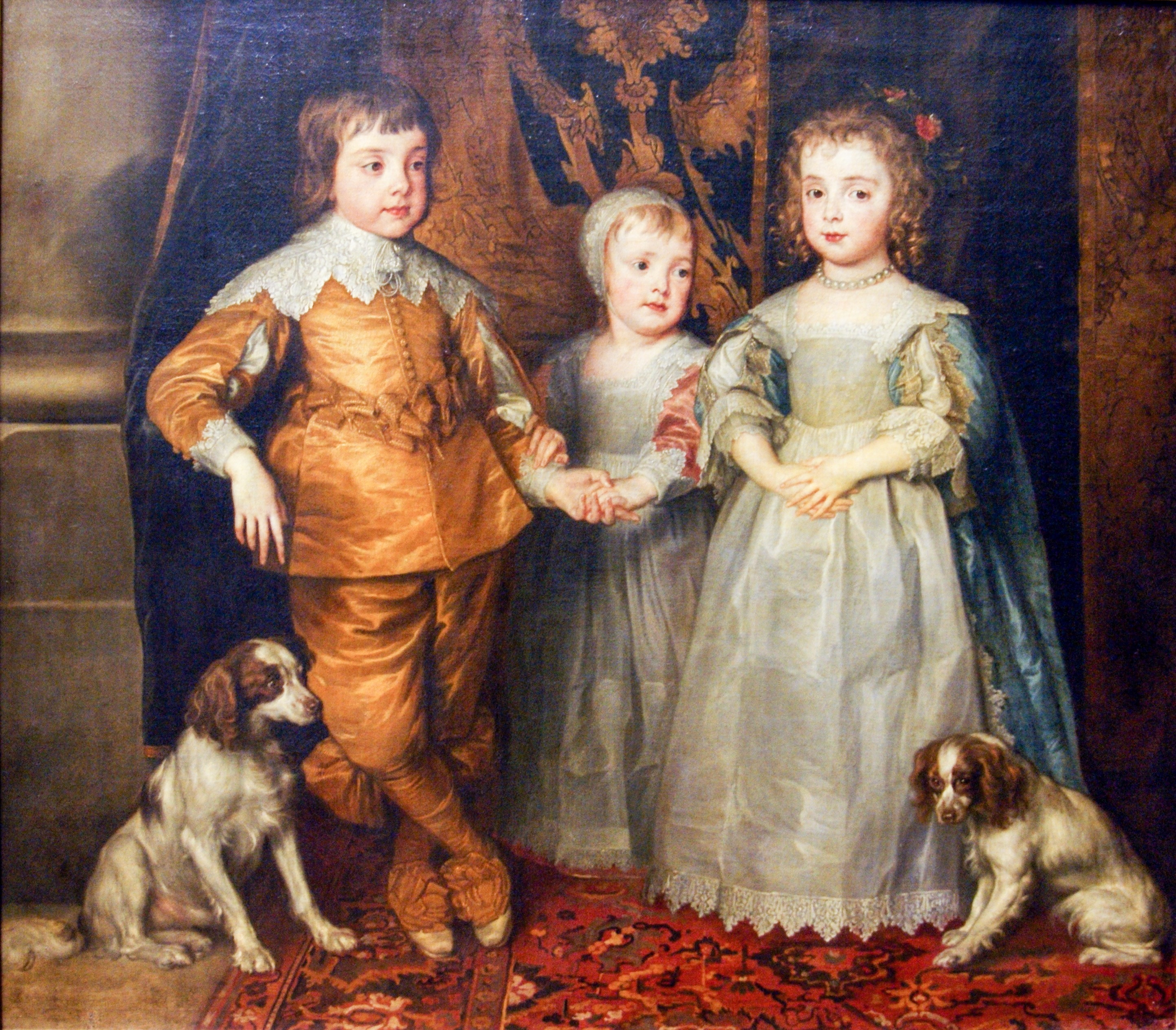
Dresden copy

== See also ==
- List of paintings by Anthony van Dyck
