= Deposition (van Dyck, 1618) =

Painting by Anthony van Dyck

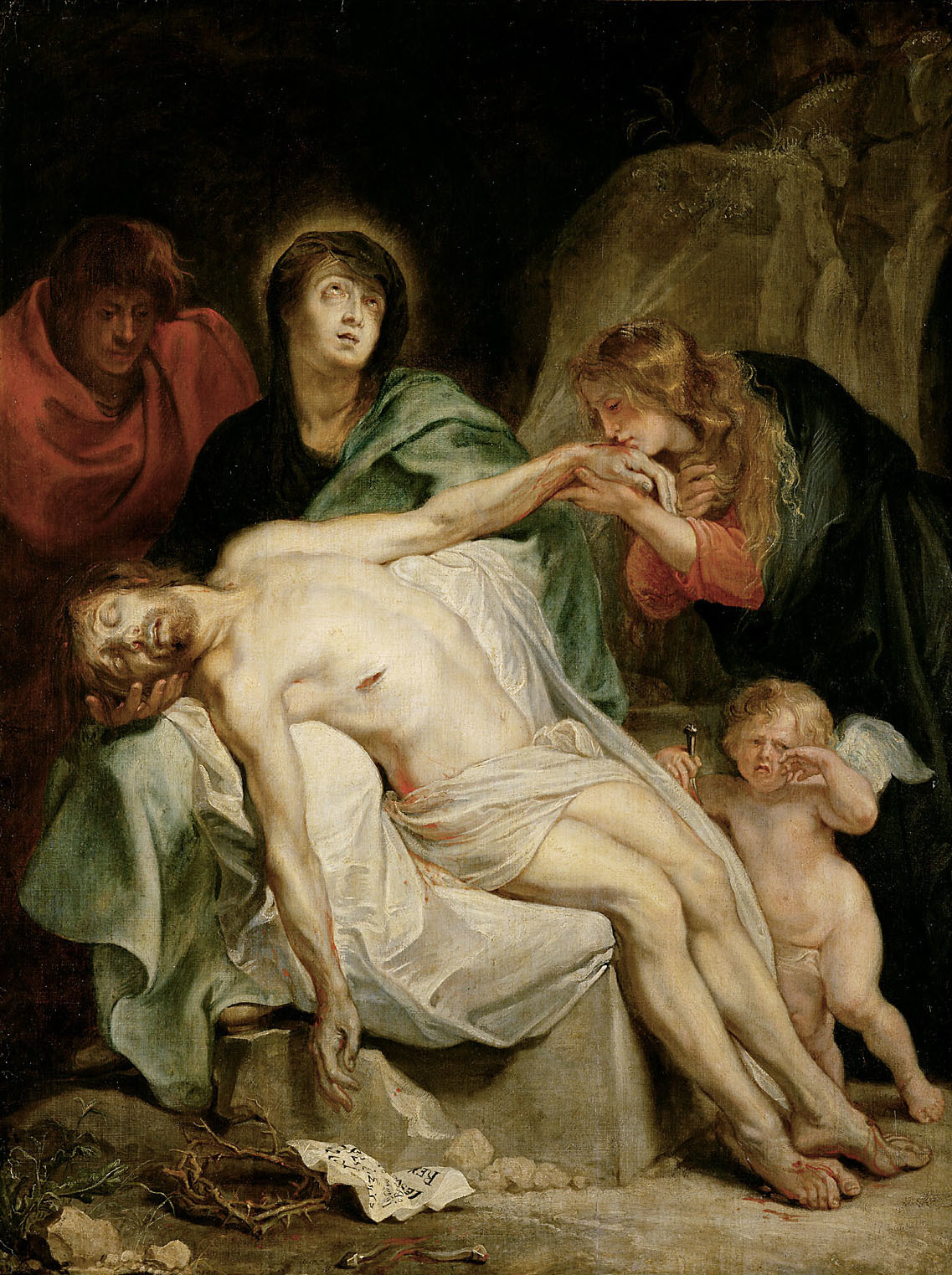
Deposition (c. 1618-1620) by Anthony van Dyck

The Deposition or Lamentation over the Dead Christ is a c. 1618-20 painting by the Flemish painter Anthony van Dyck. It is now in the Kunsthistorisches Museum, in Vienna, which it entered in 1720.

== See also ==
- List of paintings by Anthony van Dyck
