= Drunken Silenus (van Dyck) =

1620 painting by Anthony van Dyck

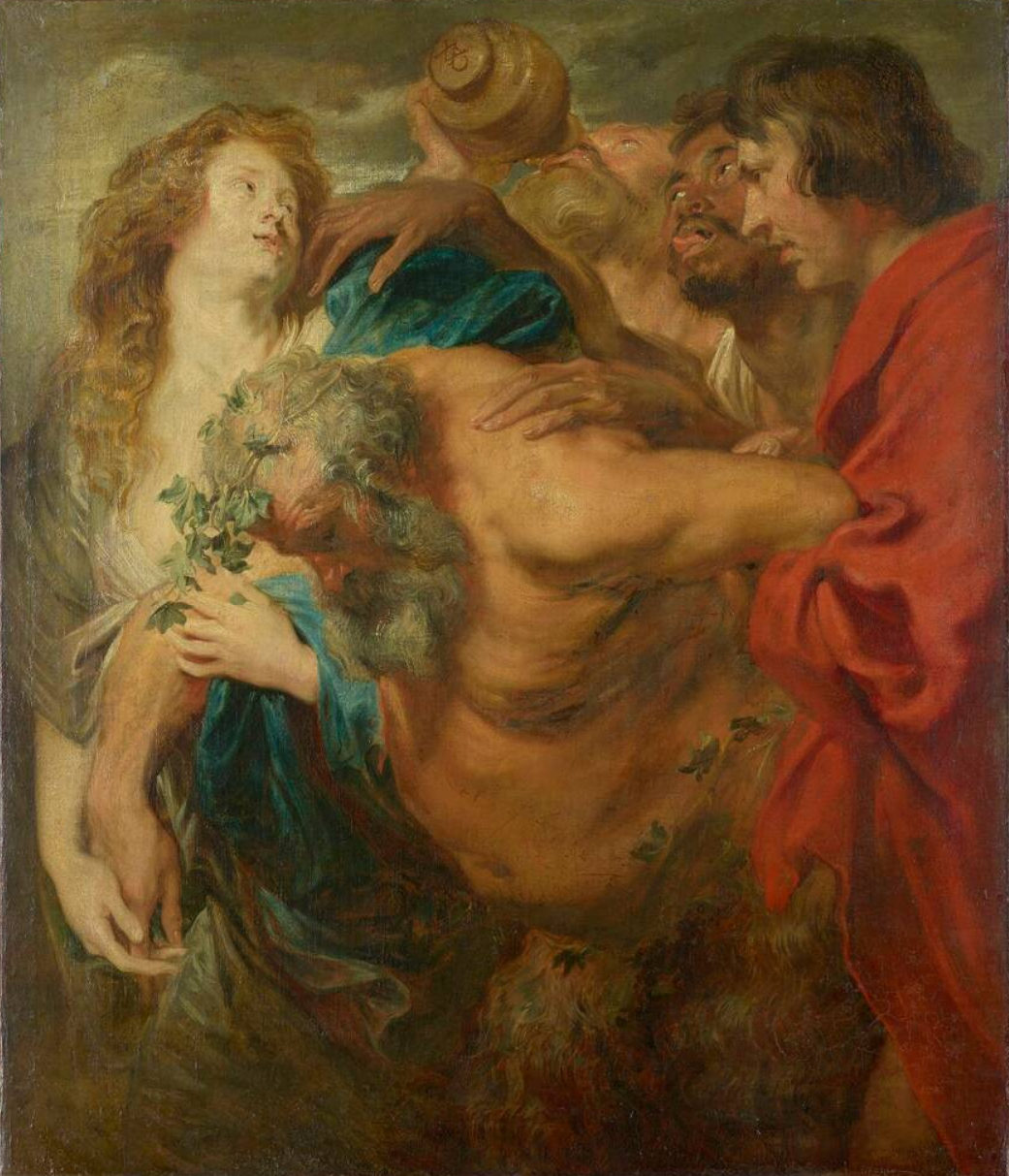
- Artist: Anthony van Dyck
- Year: 1620
- Medium: oil paint, canvas
- Dimensions: 42.13 in (107.0 cm) × 36.02 in (91.5 cm)
- Location: Gemäldegalerie Alte Meister
- Accession: Gal.-Nr. 1017
- Website: skd-online-collection.skd.museum/Details/Index/274912

Drunken Silenus is a 1620 painting by Anthony van Dyck, now in the Gemäldegalerie Alte Meister in Dresden.

== See also ==
- List of paintings by Anthony van Dyck
