= Portrait of Queen Henrietta Maria, as St Catherine =

Painting by Sir Anthony van Dyck

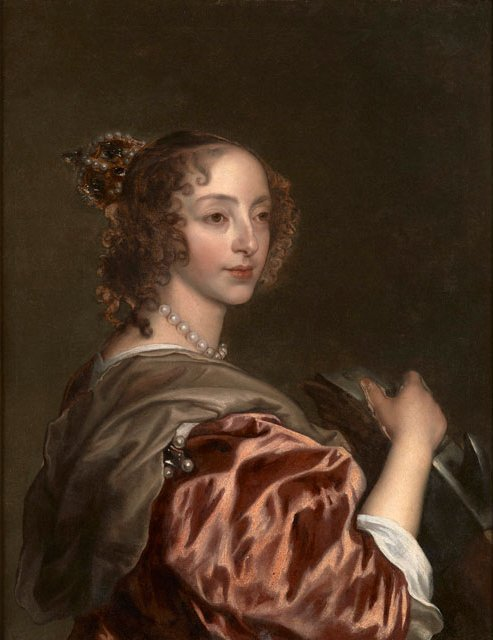
- Artist: Attributed to Anthony van Dyck
- Year: c. 1639
- Medium: Oil on canvas
- Dimensions: 70 cm × 57 cm (28 in × 22 in)
- Location: London
- Owner: Philip Mould

Portrait of Queen Henrietta Maria, as St Catherine is a painting by Sir Anthony van Dyck.

== History ==
The portrait of Queen Henrietta Maria, as St. Catherine of Alexandria was painted by van Dyck around 1639. She is depicted in a red dress, wearing a coronet and holding a wheel representing the wheel used to torture St Catherine of Alexandria.

There are numerous copies of the portrait, one of which was sold at Bonhams for £9,000 in October 2004.

Another copy, dated 1649, by Matthew Snelling, is in Alnwick Castle.

== Fake or Fortune? ==
The portrait featured in the BBC TV programme, Fake or Fortune? Philip Mould owned a portrait of Queen Henrietta Maria in a blue dress. This had been sold at Christie's on 24 January 2012. At that time it was described as being "after van Dyck" ("a fake van Dyck" for the purposes of the show's premise). It was estimated at £4,000 – £6,000 but realised £8,750 (including buyer's premium).

An X-ray suggested that Mould's portrait contained a smaller original, which had been enlarged and overpainted in the 18th century. Removal of the overpainting revealed an unfinished portrait of the Queen as St Catherine, which was subsequently attributed to Van Dyck at the conclusion of the programme by Dr Christopher Brown, director of the Ashmolean Museum and an authority on van Dyck.

Following the programme, the restored portrait went on display in the Banqueting House, Whitehall, where Henrietta once lived.

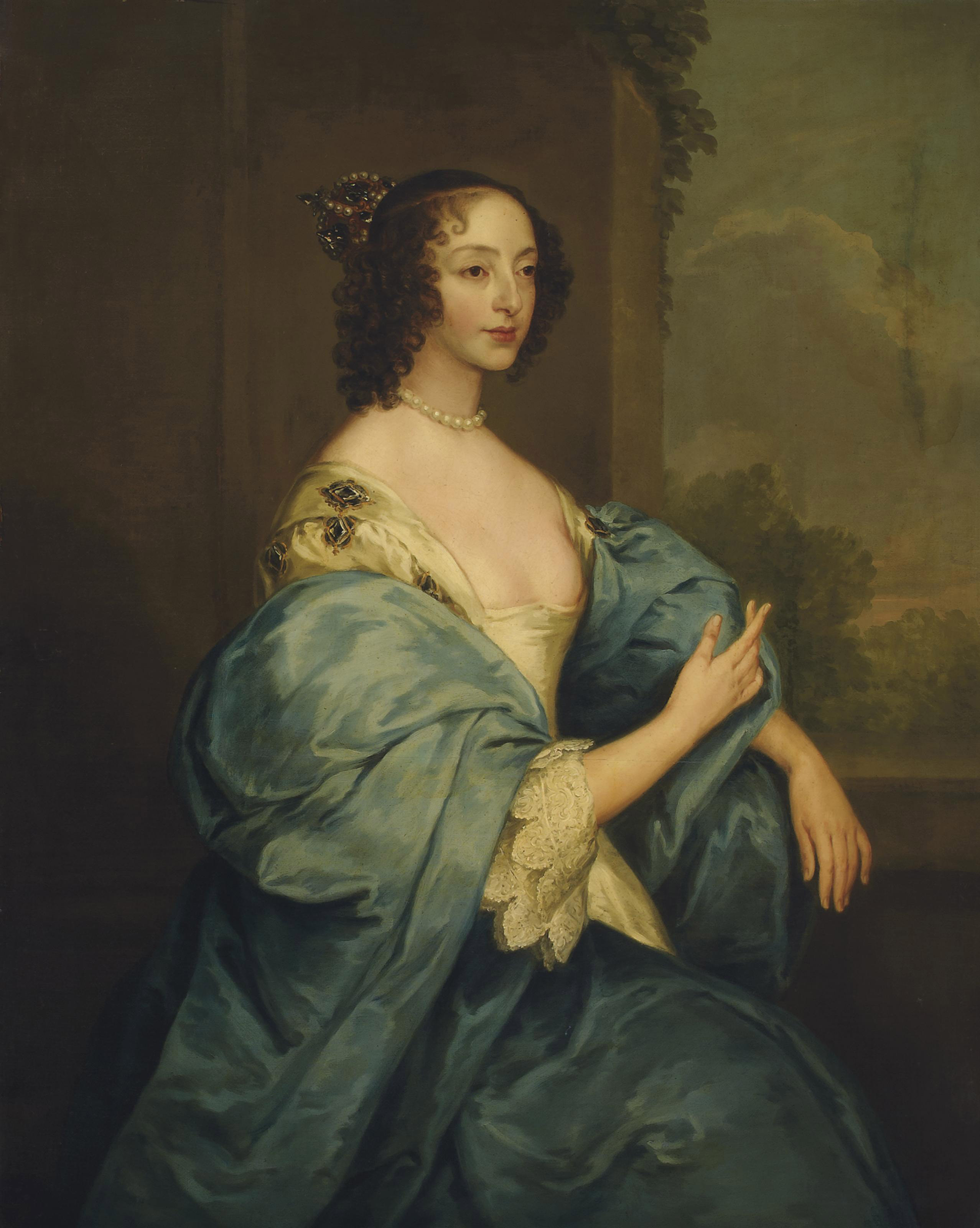
Portrait of Queen Henrietta Maria from the Philip Mould collection, before restoration.

== See also ==
- List of paintings by Anthony van Dyck
