= Lamentation over the Dead Christ (van Dyck, 1640) =

Painting by Anthony van Dyck

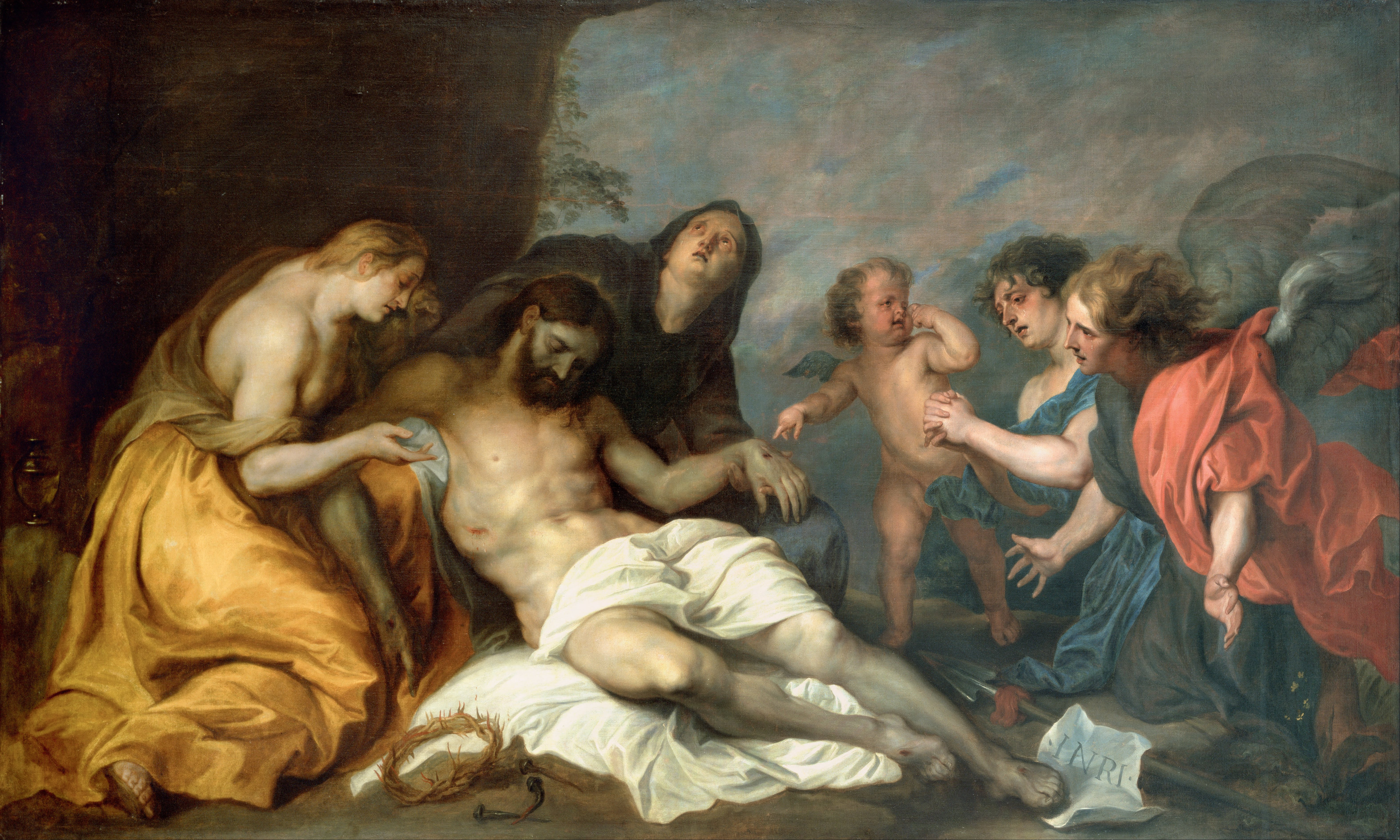
- Artist: Anthony van Dyck
- Year: c. 1630s
- Medium: oil paint, canvas
- Dimensions: 156 cm (61 in) × 256 cm (101 in)
- Location: Museo de Bellas Artes de Bilbao
- Accession: 85/221

The Lamentation over the Dead Christ is a 1634-40 painting by the Flemish artist Anthony van Dyck. One of his last treatments of the subject, it is now in the Bilbao Fine Arts Museum, having entered it in 1985. It was previously in the collection of Henry Pelham-Clinton, 7th Duke of Newcastle, before later passing into the Valdes Izaguirre collection.

== See also ==
- List of paintings by Anthony van Dyck
