= The Virgin Presenting Saint Rosalia to the Trinity =

Painting by Anthony van Dyck

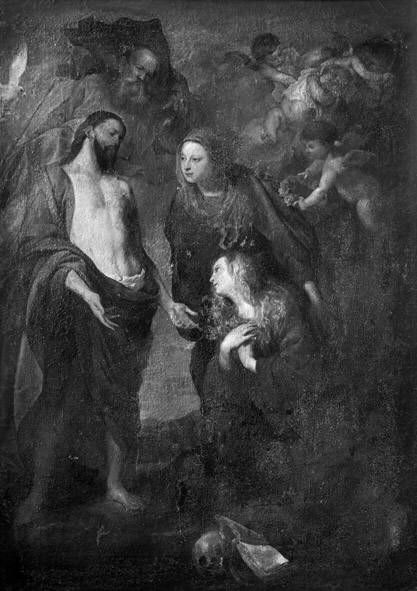
The Virgin Presenting Saint Rosalia to the Trinity (c. 1624-1625)

The Virgin Presenting Saint Rosalia to the Trinity is an oil on canvas painting, now in the Alte Pinakothek in Munich. Its poor condition makes attribution difficult, but it is usually attributed to Anthony van Dyck in his Sicilian period (1624-1625).

== See also ==
- List of paintings by Anthony van Dyck
