= Susanna and the Elders (van Dyck) =

Painting by Anthony van Dyck

Susanna and the Elders (c. 1621-1622) by Anthony van Dyck

Susanna and the Elders is an oil on canvas painting by Flemish painter Anthony van Dyck, created c. 1621-1622. It is held now in the Alte Pinakothek, in Munich, which acquired it in 1806 from the Düsseldorf Gallery.

== See also ==
- List of paintings by Anthony van Dyck
