= The Brazen Serpent (van Dyck) =

Painting by Anthony van Dyck

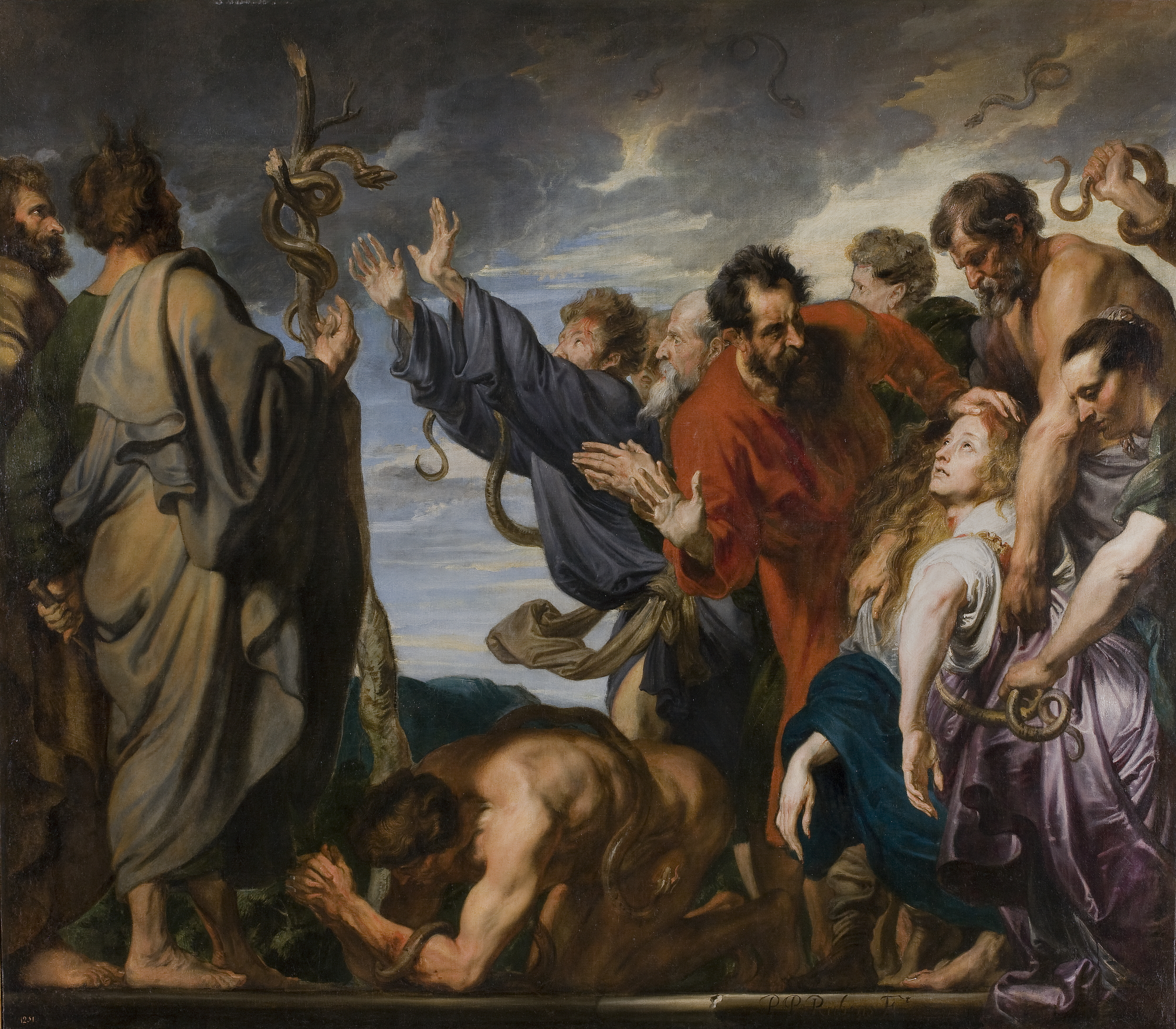
The Brazen Serpent (1618–1620) by Anthony van Dyck

The Brazen Serpent is an oil painting on canvas executed ca. 1618–1620 by the Flemish painter Anthony van Dyck, now in the Museo del Prado in Madrid. It shows the Biblical story told in Numbers whereby Moses raised a bronze image of a serpent to the Israelites. It was first recorded in 1764, when it was chosen from Juan Kelly's collection in Madrid for Charles III of Spain by Anton Raphael Mengs.

Scientific examination of the work has shown that van Dyck combined wet and dry medium for the work

== See also ==
- List of paintings by Anthony van Dyck
