= Self-portrait (van Dyck, London) =

Painting by Anthony van Dyck

- Sir Anthony van Dyck
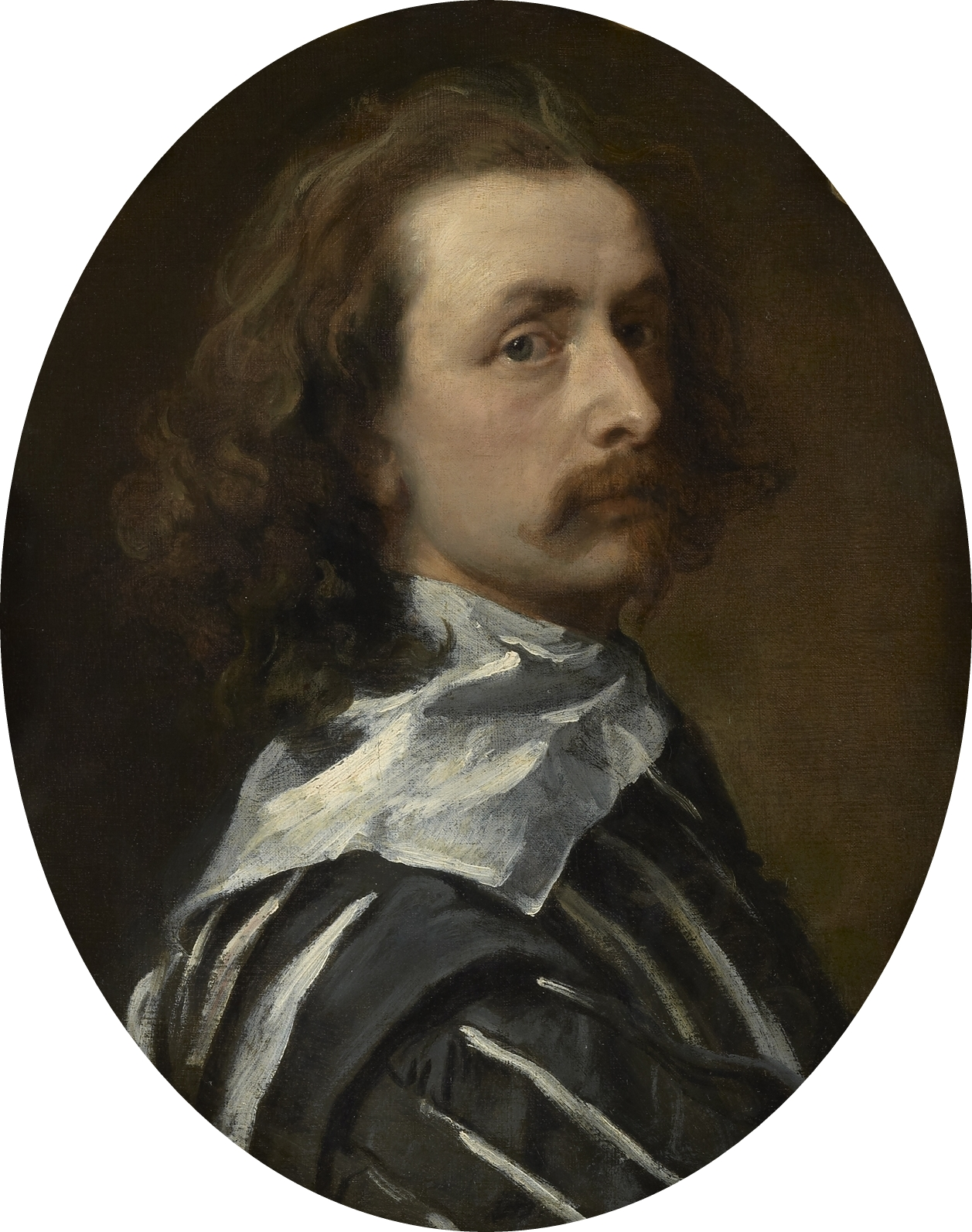
- Artist: Anthony van Dyck
- Year: c. 1640
- Medium: oil paint, canvas
- Dimensions: 56.0 cm (22.0 in) × 46.0 cm (18.1 in)
- Location: National Portrait Gallery, United Kingdom
- Owner: Alfred Bader, Philip Mould

The Self-portrait is a self-portrait by Anthony van Dyck, produced around 1640. It was purchased for the National Portrait Gallery, London in 2014.

== See also ==
- List of paintings by Anthony van Dyck
