= Jupiter and Antiope (van Dyck) =

Painting by Anthony van Dyck

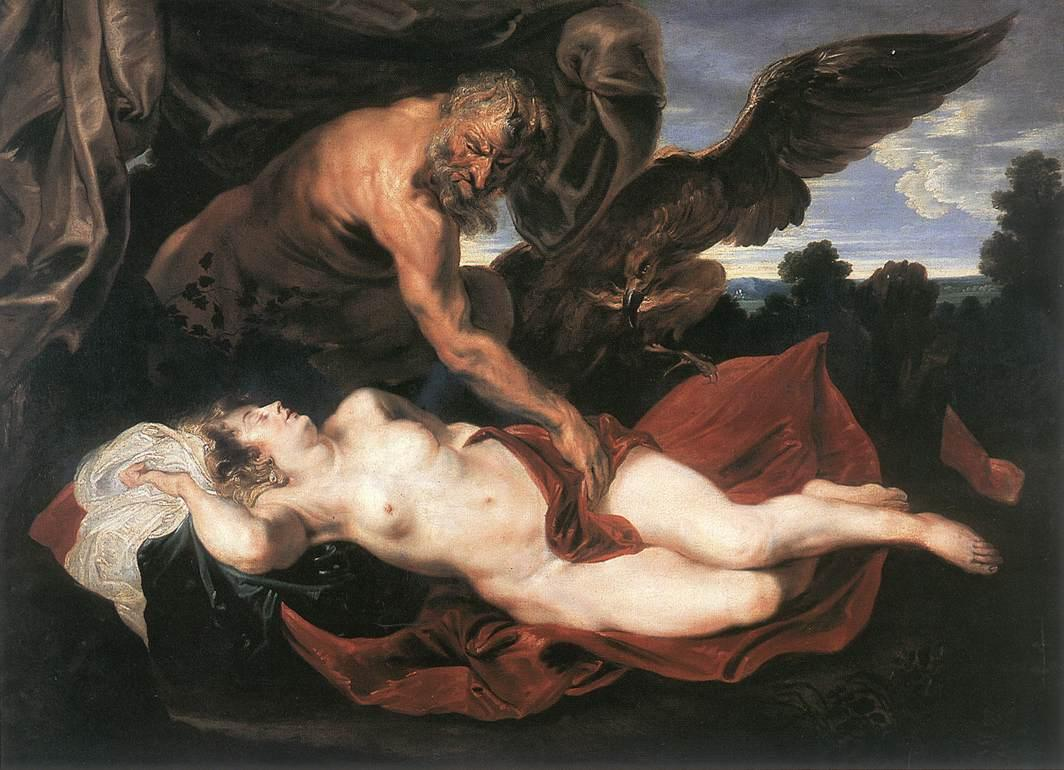
- Artist: Anthony van Dyck
- Year: c. 1620
- Medium: Oil on canvas
- Dimensions: 150 cm × 206 cm (59 in × 81 in)
- Location: Museum of Fine Arts, Ghent Wallraf-Richartz Museum, Cologne

Jupiter and Antiope is a series of two similar oil-on-canvas paintings by the late Baroque Flemish painter Anthony van Dyck, from c. 1620. One painting is in the collection of the Museum of Fine Arts, Ghent; the other in the Wallraf-Richartz Museum, Cologne.

== See also ==
- List of paintings by Anthony van Dyck
