= The Shepherd Paris (van Dyck) =

Painting Anthony van Dyck

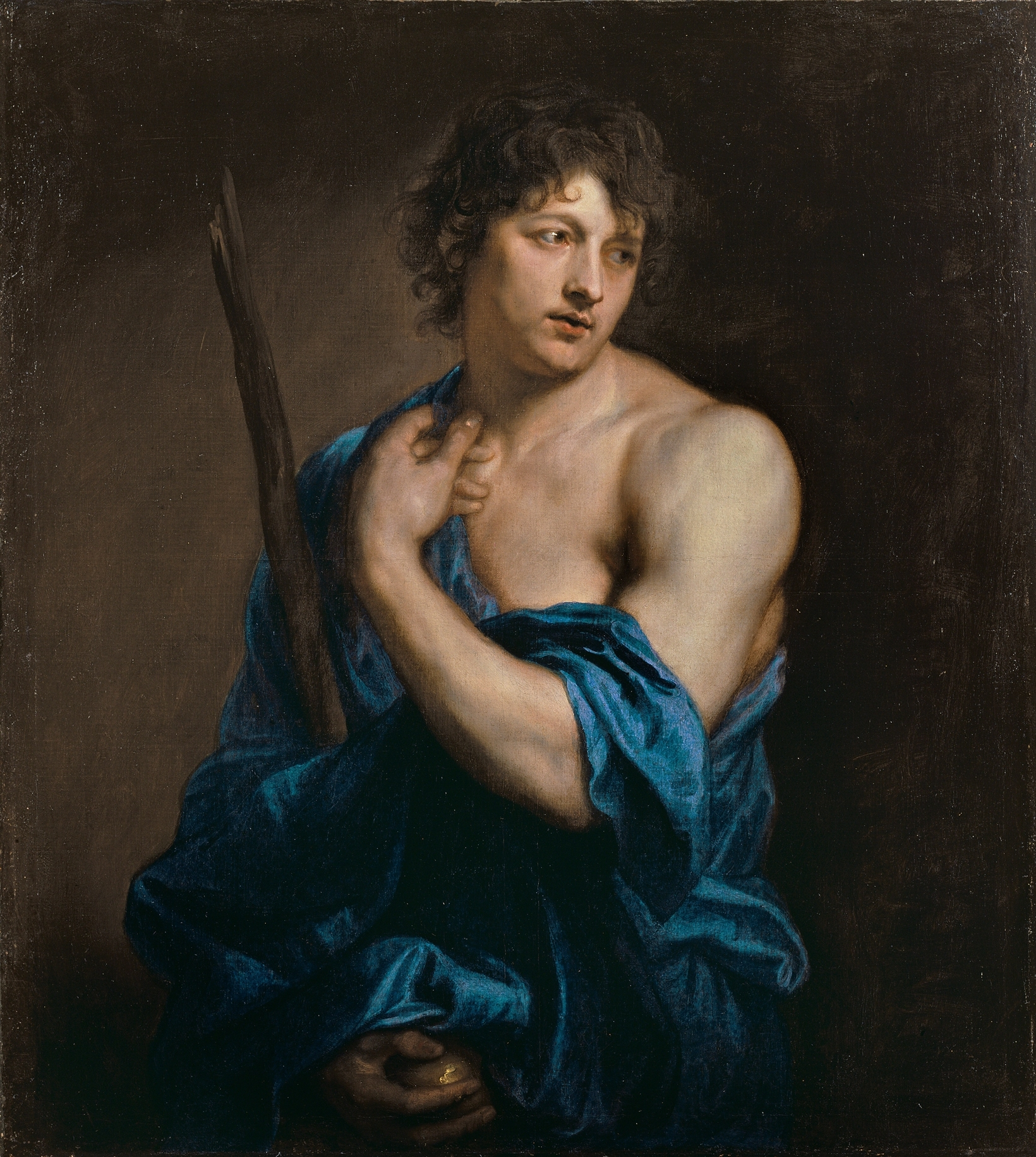
The Shepherd Paris

The Shepherd Paris is a c.1628 painting by the Flemish artist Anthony van Dyck, dating to just after the artist's return from Italy and showing the strong influence of Titian. It shows Paris during the Judgement of Paris, holding the golden apple he has been ordered to give to the most beautiful of three goddesses - unusually the artist focuses on Paris and does not show the goddesses themselves.

A painting of Paris recorded as owned by the marquis de Voyer d'Argenson in 1754 is probably to be identified with this work. It is now in the Wallace Collection. It was acquired by Henry Hope prior to 1807 before being bought by Francis Charles Seymour-Conway, 3rd Marquess of Hertford when the Hope collection was sold at Christie's on 29 June 1816. At that time, it was thought to be a self-portrait of van Dyck himself. The Marquess intended to bequeath the painting to George IV but he outlived the king and was unable to do so.

== See also ==
- List of paintings by Anthony van Dyck
