= Madonna and Child with Two Donors (van Dyck) =

Painting by Anthony van Dyck

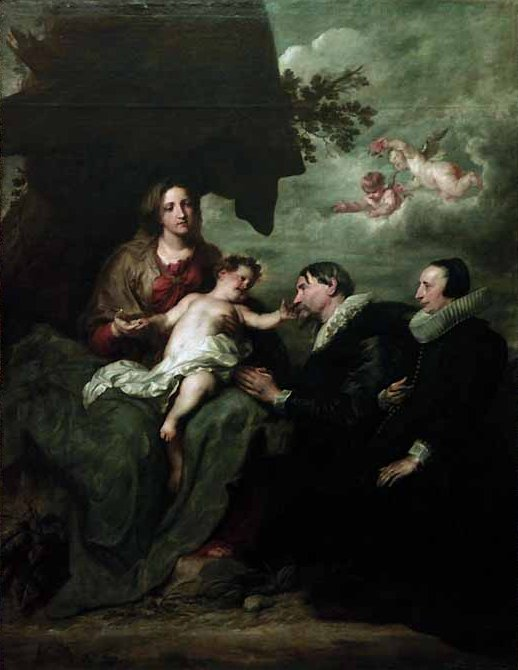
Madonna and Child with Two Donors (1630) by Anthony van Dyck

Madonna and Child with Two Donors or The Madonna of the Two Donors is a 1630 painting by Anthony van Dyck, now in the Louvre, in Paris.

The identity of the two kneeling donors is unknown but they are probably a rich couple from Antwerp, where van Dyck was then working. It soon left its original location and is recorded in the collection of Louis XIV of France as early as 1685.

== See also ==
- List of paintings by Anthony van Dyck

== Bibliography ==
- Gian Pietro Bellori, Vite de' pittori, scultori e architecti moderni, Torino, Einaudi, 1976.
- Didier Bodart, Van Dyck, Prato, Giunti, 1997.
- Christopher Brown, Van Dyck 1599-1641, Milano, RCS Libri, 1999, ISBN 88-17-86060-3.
- Justus Müller Hofstede, Van Dyck, Milano, Rizzoli/Skira, 2004.
- Stefano Zuffi, Il Barocco, Verona, Mondadori, 2004.
