= Venus Asks Vulcan to Forge Arms for her Son Aeneas =

Painting by Anthony van Dyck

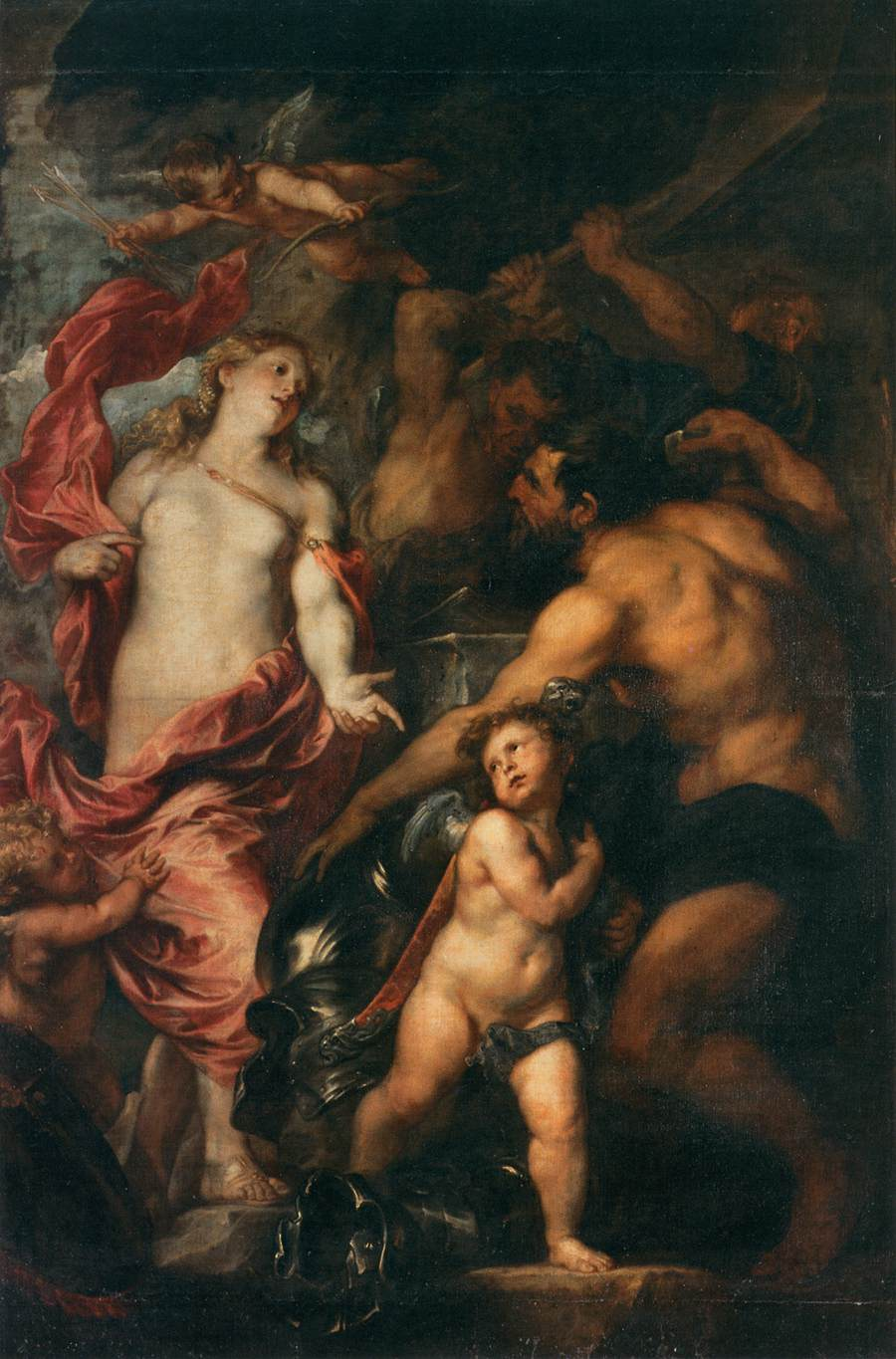
Venus Asks Vulcan to Forge Arms for her Son Aeneas (1630–1632) by Anthony van Dyck

Venus Asks Vulcan to Forge Arms for her Son Aeneas or Venus at Vulcan's Forge is a 1630–1632 oil on canvas painting by Anthony van Dyck, now in the Louvre Museum, in Paris. It depicts a scene from Virgil's Aeneid (Book VIII, lines 370–385) in which Venus asks her husband Vulcan to forge weapons for Aeneas, her son by Anchises, with her other son Cupid appearing in the centre foreground.

It does not appear in the 1683 Charles Le Brun inventory of Louis XIV's collections, but was acquired by the latter sometime before the compilation of the 1709 inventory by Jacques Bailly. It had been expanded at the top and bottom by 1709, probably in the late 17th century. It was first exhibited at its present home in 1793.

== See also ==
- List of paintings by Anthony van Dyck
