= The Crowning with Thorns (van Dyck) =

Painting by Anthony van Dyck

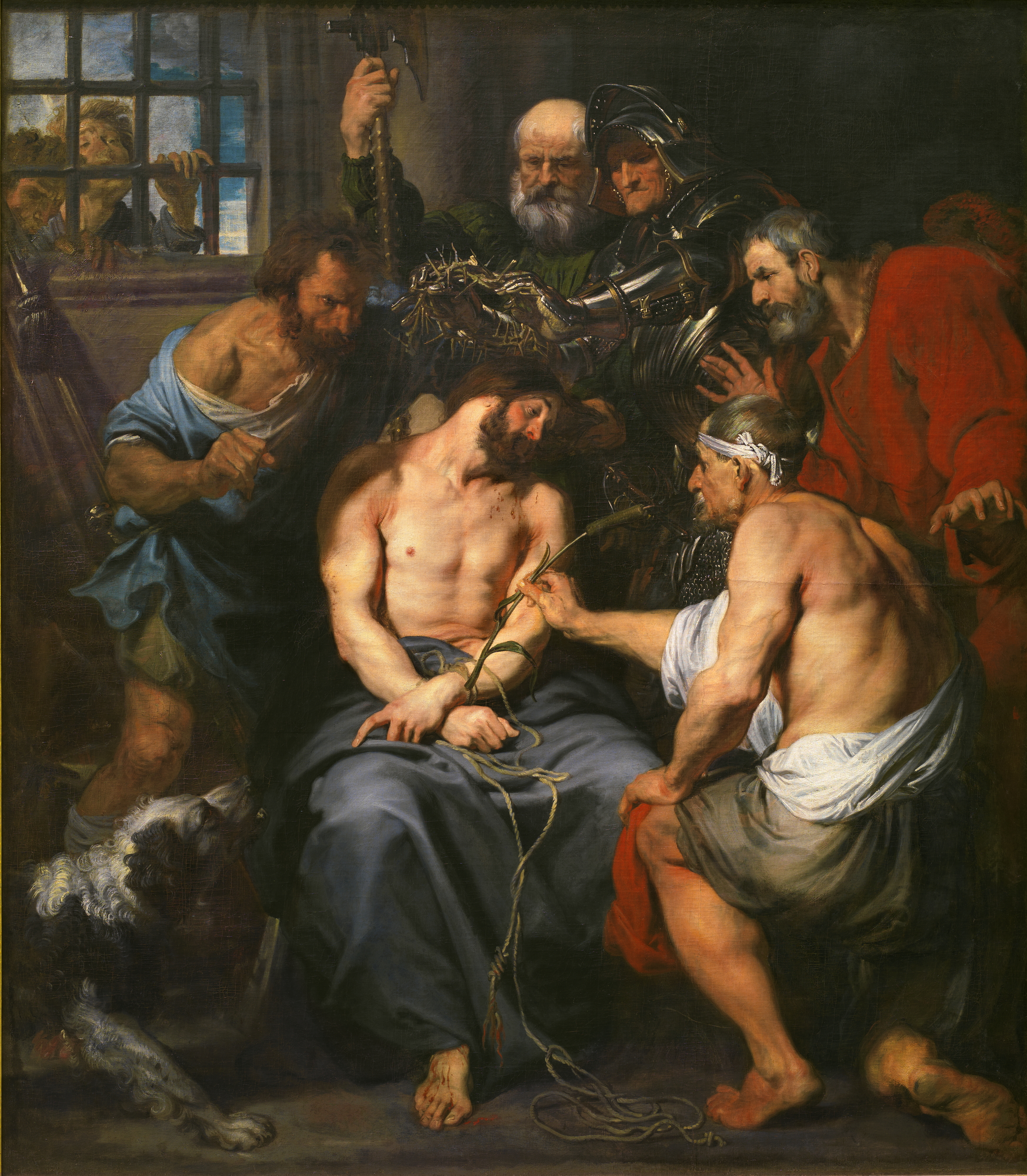
- Artist: Anthony van Dyck
- Year: 1618–1620
- Medium: oil on canvas
- Dimensions: 225 cm × 197 cm (89 in × 78 in)
- Location: Museo del Prado, Madrid

The Crowning with Thorns is an oil painting on canvas created ca. 1618–1620 by the Flemish artist Anthony van Dyck. He produced it aged 20 during his first Antwerp period, when he was the main studio assistant and pupil of Peter Paul Rubens. The painting shows Rubens' influence in its relatively sombre palette, chiaroscuro and highly realistic portrayal of musculature. Van Dyck seems to have completed it early during his stay in Italy, since it also shows the influence of Titian and other Venetian painters, as seen in the treatment of Jesus' face.

Once it was complete, van Dyck offered the painting to Rubens, who declined it. It was then bought by Philip IV of Spain, who held it in the Escorial before it entered the Museo del Prado, in Madrid, in 1839.

== See also ==
- List of paintings by Anthony van Dyck
