= The Lamentation of Christ (Anthony van Dyck, Alte Pinakothek) =

Painting by Anthony van Dyck

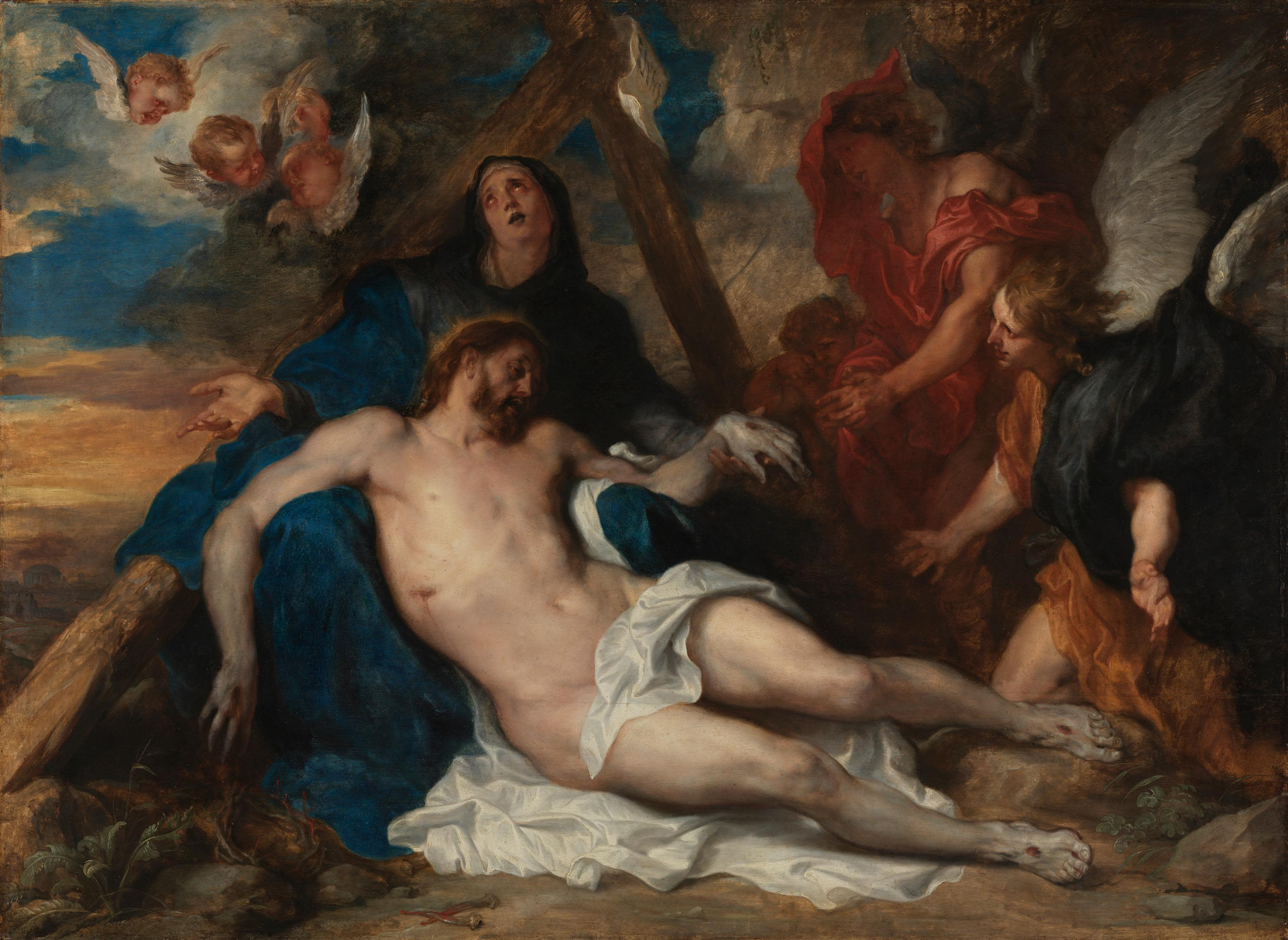
The lamentation of Christ (1634) by Anthony van Dyck

The lamentation of Christ is a painting by the Flemish artist Anthony van Dyck dated to 1628-1630. It is in the collection of the Alte Pinakothek in Munich. The artist had treated the same subject in multiple works, including two versions in the Royal Museum of Fine Arts Antwerp in Antwerp and one in the Kunsthistorisches Museum in Vienna.

== See also ==
- List of paintings by Anthony van Dyck
