= Deposition (van Dyck, 1629–30) =

Painting by Anthony van Dyck

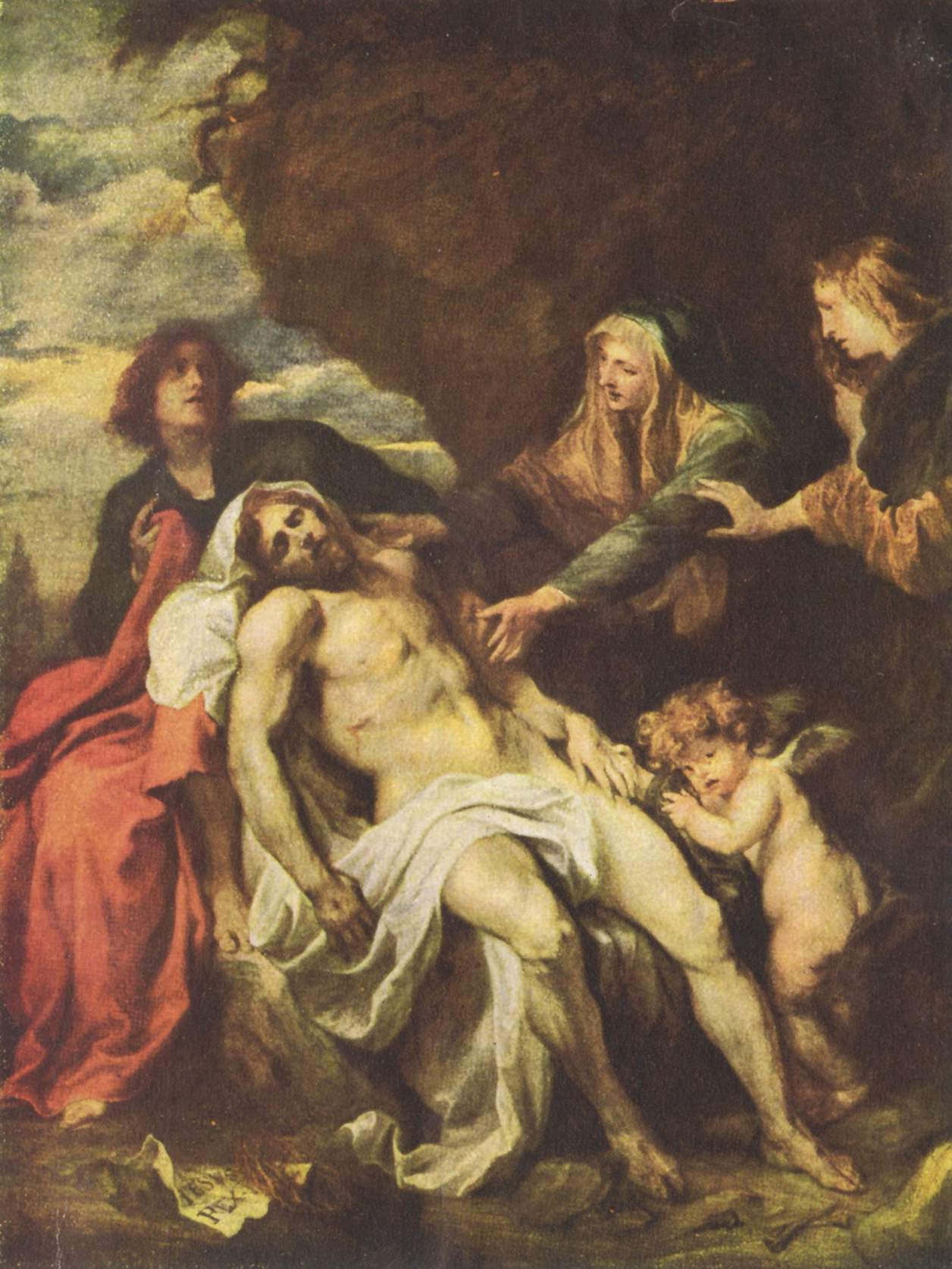
Deposition (c. 1629–1630) by Anthony van Dyck

The Deposition or Lamentation over the Dead Christ was a painting by the Flemish painter Anthony van Dyck, produced between 1629 and 1630. It measured 220 cm by 166 cm. Its final owners were the Kaiser Friedrich Museum then the Gemäldegalerie, Berlin, before it was lost (either missing or destroyed) in May 1945 in the Friedrichshain flak tower fire. A copy of the work is now in the Gedächtniskapelle of the Deutschordensmünster in Heilbronn.

== See also ==
- List of paintings by Anthony van Dyck
