= Saint Rosalie Interceding for the Plague-stricken of Palermo =

1624 painting by Anthony van Dyck

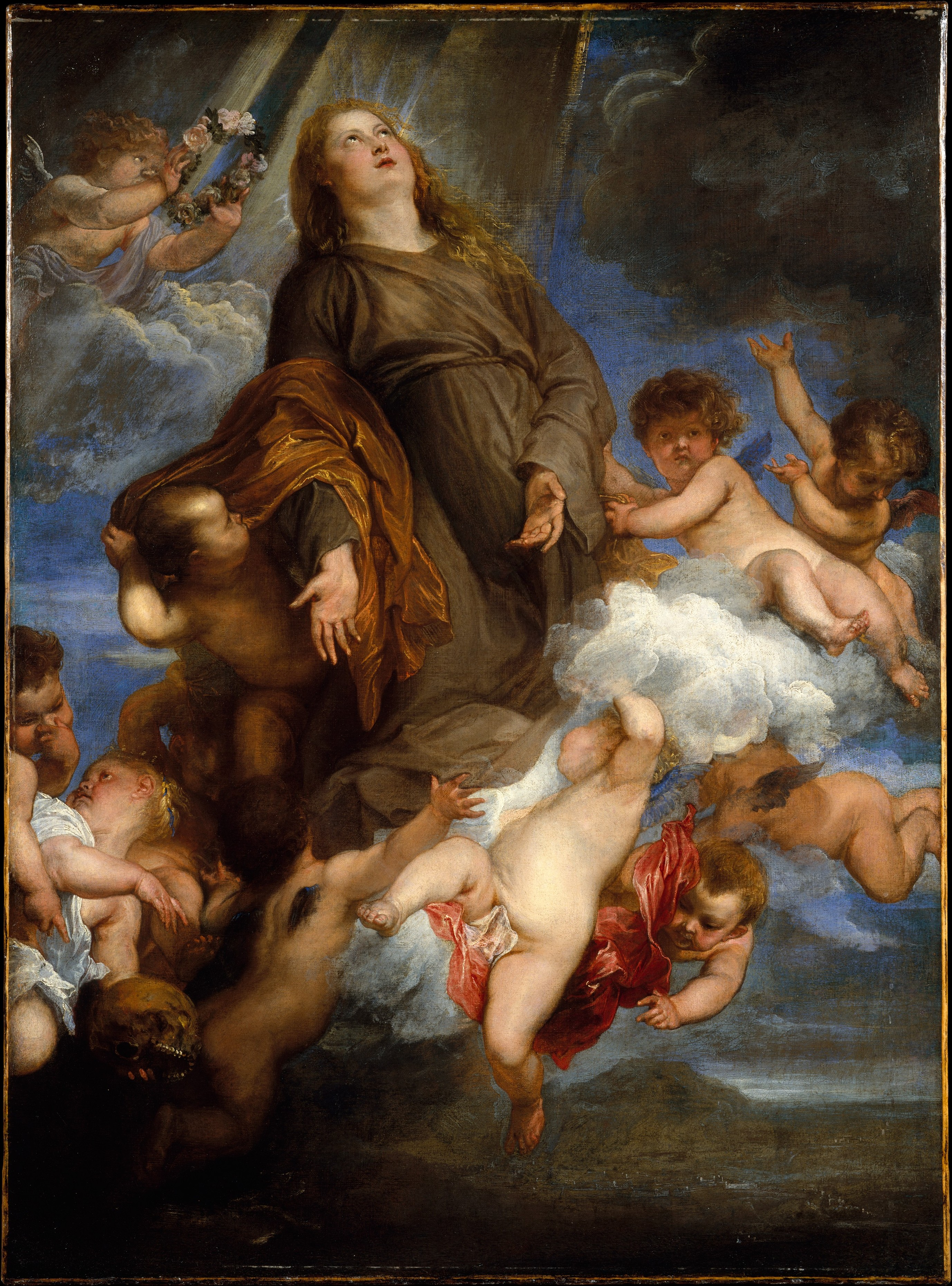
- Artist: Anthony van Dyck
- Year: 1624
- Medium: Oil on canvas
- Dimensions: 99.7 cm × 73.7 cm (39.3 in × 29.0 in)
- Location: Metropolitan Museum of Art; New York
- Accession: 71.41

Saint Rosalie Interceding for the Plague-stricken of Palermo is a painting of 1624 by Anthony van Dyck, in the Metropolitan Museum of Art in New York since 1871.

The painting depicts Saint Rosalia, the patron saint of Palermo, interceding for the city during an outbreak of the plague. In the background can be seen the port of Palermo and Monte Pellegrino.

The painting was one of six of Saint Rosalia produced in Palermo by van Dyck in the late summer of 1624 and early 1625, when the city was quarantined. He returned to the subject in 1629 with Coronation of Saint Rosalia (Vienna) and Saint Rosalia Interceding for the City of Palermo (Ponce, Puerto Rico).

The work is currently (2020) on view at the Metropolitan Museum of Art. It was an early acquisition by the institution, whose curators initially mistook it for an Assumption of the Virgin. An undated but probably autograph copy of the work is now in the Alte Pinakothek in Munich.

== History ==
The saint's remains (she died in 1166) were said to have been found on Mount Pellegrino on 15 July 1624, the same year as the painting was executed. The piece was bought or commissioned by Antonio Ruffo, a Sicilian nobleman and art collector, who later also owned Aristotle with a Bust of Homer by Rembrandt, which he commissioned in 1653, and who was patron to Matthias Stom. In recent years, using the technique of radiography based on neutron emission, it has been discovered that for this particular painting, van Dyck re-used a canvas which had previously borne a sketch for a self-portrait.

== See also ==
- List of paintings by Anthony van Dyck
