= Lamentation over the Dead Christ (van Dyck, 1629) =

Painting by Anthony van Dyck

The Lamentation over the Dead Christ
- Artist: Anthony van Dyck
- Year: c. 1629
- Medium: oil paint, canvas
- Dimensions: 303 cm (119 in) × 225 cm (89 in)
- Location: Royal Museum of Fine Arts Antwerp, béguinage of Antwerp
- Accession no.: 403
- Identifiers: RKDimages ID: 293416

The Lamentation over the Dead Christ is a painting by the Flemish painter Anthony van Dyck, created c. 1629. It is now in the Royal Museum of Fine Arts Antwerp.

== See also ==
- List of paintings by Anthony van Dyck
