= Saint Rosalia Interceding for the City of Palermo =

Painting by Anthony van Dyck

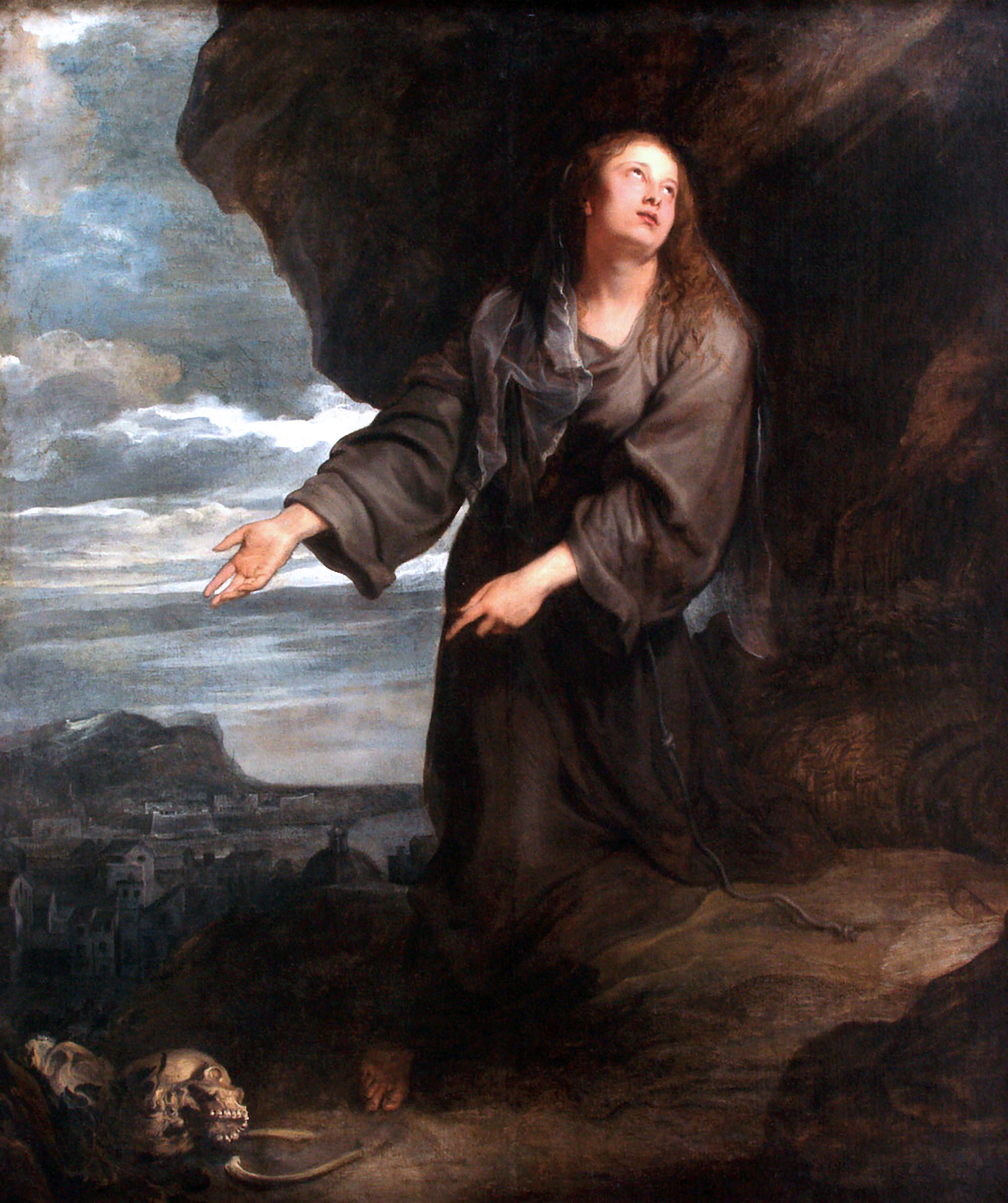
Saint Rosalia Interceding for the City of Palermo (c. 1624-1629) by Anthony van Dyck

Saint Rosalia Interceding for the City of Palermo is an oil on canvas painting of Saint Rosalia by Anthony van Dyck, now in the Museo de Arte de Ponce in Puerto Rico, which acquired it at auction at Sotheby's in London on 7 December 1960. It is sometimes dated to 1629 when the artist was back in Antwerp and sometimes to 1624-1625 whilst the artist was quarantined in Palermo, Sicily.

The work is said to have been a gift from Louis II de Bourbon to the Marquis de Cossart d'Espies of the Chateau d'Omercourt. It is next recorded in 1939, by which time it belonged to the Baron de Coriolis. A copy after the autograph version is now in the Capella dei Santi Pietro e Paolo dell'Infermeria dei Sacerdoti in Palermo.

== See also ==
- List of paintings by Anthony van Dyck
