= The Betrayal of Christ (van Dyck, Minneapolis) =

Painting by Anthony van Dyck

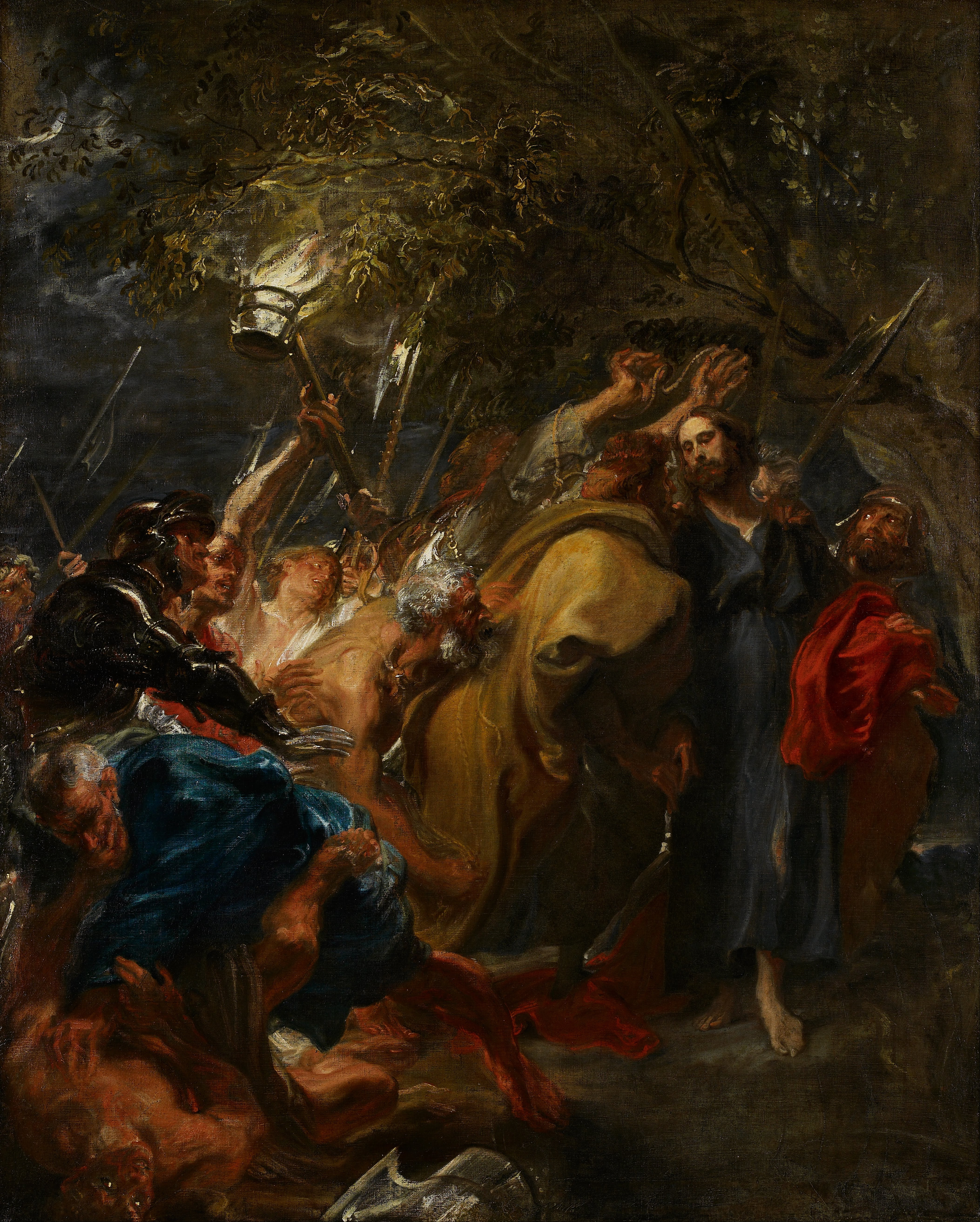
The Betrayal of Christ (1620) by Anthony van Dyck

The Betrayal of Christ is a 1620 painting by Anthony van Dyck, now in the Minneapolis Institute of Arts. He also produced two other versions of the same subject at around the same time, now in Bristol and Madrid.

== See also ==
- List of paintings by Anthony van Dyck
