= List of paintings by Anthony van Dyck =

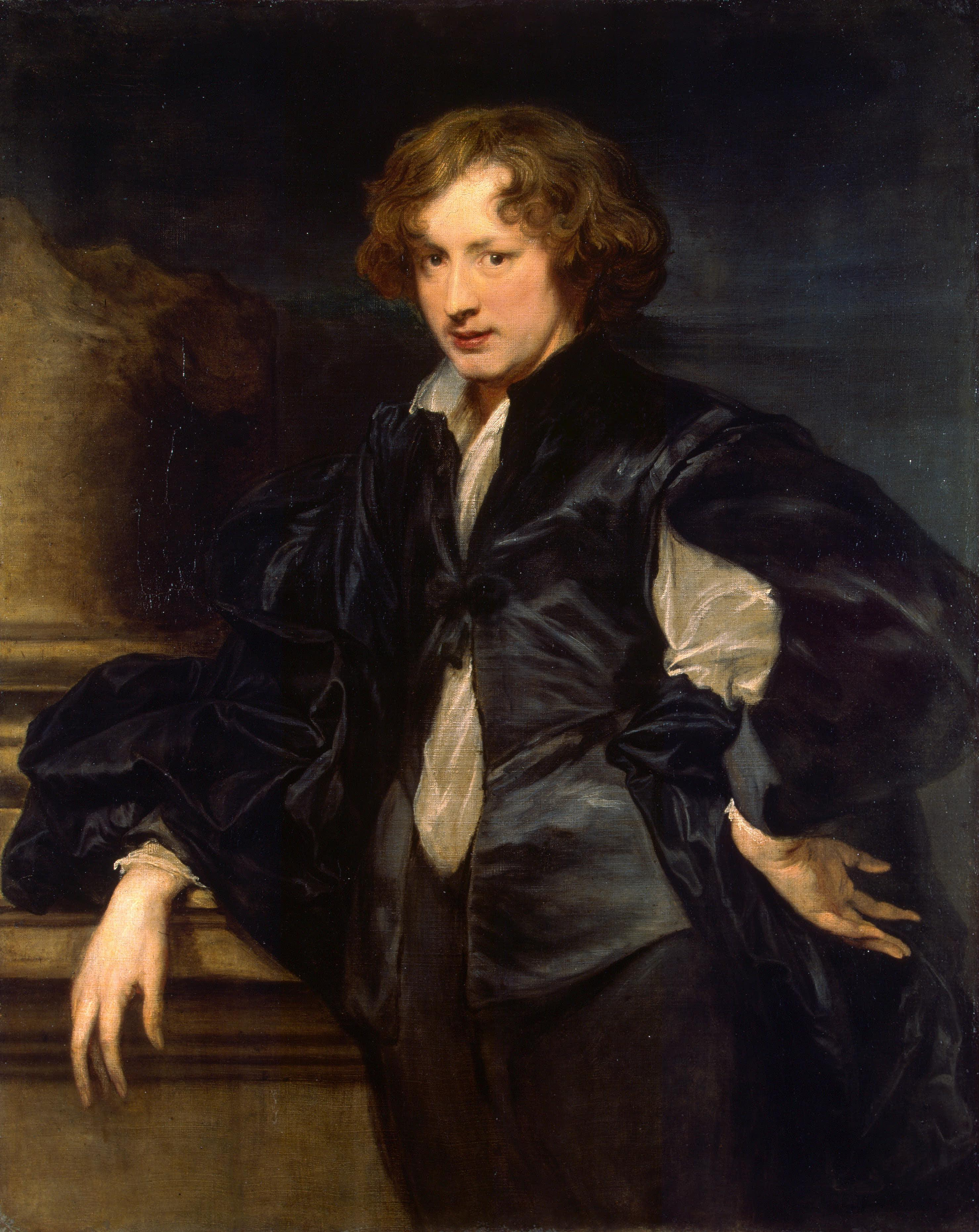
Self-portrait by van Dyck, 1623

The following is an incomplete list of works by the Flemish painter Anthony van Dyck (1599–1641).

== Portraits (1613–1632) ==
Between 1613 and 1632, van Dyck travelled all over Europe – from his native Antwerp (where he began working as a painter, initially under Hendrick van Balen and later with Peter Paul Rubens), to England for a brief stay at the court of James I and then to Italy, where he had the chance to get to know the old masters. He then finally settled back in Flanders.

Title	Year	Collection	City and country	Material	Dimensions	Image
Self-portrait (1613–14)	1613–1614	Academy of Fine Arts Vienna	Vienna, Austria	Oil on canvas	25,8 × 19,5 cm	
Self-portrait (1617–18)	1617–1618	Alte Pinakothek	Munich, Germany	Oil on canvas	82,5 × 70 cm	
Portrait of a Lady	ca. 1620	Legion of Honor Museum, Fine Arts Museums of San Francisco	San Francisco, United States	Oil on Canvas	148 x 109.2 cm	Van Dyck - Portrait of a Lady, ca. 1620, 75.2.11
Portrait of Cornelis van der Geest	ca. 1620	National Gallery	London, United Kingdom	Oil on wood	37.5 cm (14.8 in) × 32.5 cm (12.8 in)	
Self-portrait 1620–21	1620–1621	Metropolitan Museum of Art	New York City, United States	Oil on canvas	119,7 × 87,9 cm	
Portrait of Thomas Howard, 2nd Earl of Arundel	1620–1621	Getty Museum	Los Angeles, United States	Oil on panel	102,8 × 79,4 cm	
Portrait of Agostino Pallavicini	1621	Getty Museum	Los Angeles, United States	Oil on canvas	217.5 × 142.2 cm	Anthony van Dyck - Portrait of Agostino Pallavicini - Google Art Project
Portrait of Isabella Brant	1621	National Gallery of Art	Washington, D.C., United States	Oil on canvas	153 × 120 cm	
Portrait of Frans Snyders and his wife Margareta de Vos	1621	Gemäldegalerie Alte Meister	Kassel, Germany	Oil on canvas	82 × 110 cm	
Portrait of Sir Robert Shirley	1622	Petworth House	Petworth, United Kingdom	Oil on canvas	200 × 133,5 cm	
Portrait of Lady Theresa Shirley	1622	Petworth House	Petworth, United Kingdom	Oil on canvas	200 × 133,4 cm	
Portrait of François Duquesnoy	1622	Royal Museums of Fine Arts of Belgium	Brussels, Belgium	Oil on canvas	77,5 × 61 cm	
Luigia Cattaneo-Gentile	1622 circa	Musée des Beaux-Arts	Strasbourg, France	Oil on canvas	147 × 112 cm	
Self-portrait 1622–23	1622–1623	Hermitage Museum	Saint Petersburg, Russia	Oil on canvas	116,5 × 93,5 cm	
Portrait of marchesa Lomellini with her children	1623	São Paulo Museum of Art	São Paulo, Brazil	Oil on canvas	221 × 152 cm	
Portrait of Elena Cattaneo	1623	National Gallery of Art	Washington DC, United States	Oil on canvas	246 × 173 cm	
Portrait of cardinal Guido Bentivoglio	1623	Palazzo Pitti	Florence, Italy	Oil on canvas	196 × 145 cm	
The Lomellini Family	1623	National Gallery of Scotland	Edinburgh, United Kingdom	Oil on canvas	265 × 248 cm	
Portrait of Emanuele Filiberto, prince of Savoy	1624	Dulwich Picture Gallery	London, United Kingdom	Oil on canvas	126 × 99,6 cm	
Portrait of a Genoese Noblewoman with her Son	1625	National Gallery of Art	Washington DC, United States	Oil on canvas	189 × 139 cm	
Portrait of a man in armour	1625–1627	Cincinnati Art Museum	Cincinnati, United States	Oil on canvas	137,2 × 121,3	
Portrait of Jan van Monfort	1626–1628	Kunsthistorisches Museum	Vienna, Austria	Oil on canvas	114,5 × 88,5 cm	
Portrait of Johannes Baptista Franck	1626–1632	Kunsthistorisches Museum	Vienna, Austria	Oil on canvas	117 × 91 cm	
Equestrian Portrait of Anton Giulio Brignole-Sale	1627	Palazzo Rosso	Genoa, Italy	Oil on canvas	282 × 198 cm	
Double portrait of Cornelis and Lucas de Wael	1627	Capitoline Museums	Rome, Italy	Oil on canvas	120 × 101 cm	
Man with a Lute	1627 circa	Museo del Prado	Madrid, Spain	Oil on canvas	128.7 x 101 cm	
Count Hendrik van den Bergh	1627-1632	Museo del Prado	Madrid, Spain	Oil on canvas	114 x 100 cm	
Portrait of Nicholas Lanier	1628	Kunsthistorisches Museum	Vienna, Austria	Oil on canvas	111,5 × 87,5	
Portrait of the Archduchess Isabella dressed as a widow	1628–1629	Galleria Sabauda	Turin, Italy	Oil on canvas	183 × 121 cm	
Portrait of Frederick Henry, prince of Orange	1628–1629	Baltimore Museum of Art	Baltimore, United States	Oil on canvas	112,5 × 95 cm	
Portrait of the duke of Arenberg	1628–1632	Holkham Hall	Holkham, United Kingdom	Oil on canvas	315 × 240 cm	
Portrait of a Man	1628-1632	Museo del Prado	Madrid, Spain	Oil on canvas	112 x 100 cm	
Portrait of Jean-Charles della Faille	1629	Royal Museums of Fine Arts of Belgium	Brussels, Belgium	Oil on canvas	130,8 × 118,5	
Portrait of Maria Luisa de Tassis	1629	Vaduz Castle	Vaduz, Liechtenstein	Oil on canvas	128,2 × 99,5 cm	
Portrait of Carolus Scribani	1629	Kunsthistorisches Museum	Vienna, Austria	Oil on canvas	117,5 × 104 cm	
Portrait of Olivia Boteler Porter	1630s	Bowes Museum	Barnard Castle, United Kingdom	Oil on canvas		
Portrait of a Man With Gloves	1630	Kunsthistorisches Museum	Vienna, Austria	Oil on canvas	111 × 85 cm	
Portrait of Martin Rijckaert	1630	Museo del Prado	Madrid, Spain	Oil on canvas	148 × 113 cm	
Portrait of a General Wearing a Red Sash	1630–1632	Gemäldegalerie Alte Meister	Dresden, Germany	Oil on canvas	90 × 70 cm	
Portrait of Maria de' Medici	1631	Musée des Beaux-Arts	Bordeaux, France	Oil on canvas	246 × 148	
Portrait of Gaston d'Orléans	1631	Musée Condé	Chantilly, France	Oil on canvas	193 × 119 cm	
Portrait of Philippe Le Roy, Lord of Ravels	1631	Wallace Collection	London, United Kingdom	Oil on panel	213 × 120 cm	
Portrait of Jacques Le Roy	1631	Thyssen-Bornemisza Museum	Madrid, Spain	Oil on canvas	117.8 x 100.6 cm	
Portrait of Prince Charles Louis	1631–1632	Kunsthistorisches Museum	Vienna, Austria	Oil on canvas	176 × 96 cm	
Portrait of Prince Rupert of the Rhine	1631–1632	Kunsthistorisches Museum	Vienna, Austria	Oil on canvas	175 × 95,5 cm	

== Portraits (1632–1641) ==
From 1632 until his death in 1641, van Dyck travelled regularly to London and the court of his patron Charles I. An art lover, Charles I made van Dyck his Principal Painter and a baronet. In between he spent short periods in Antwerp, Brussels and Paris, where he hoped to become a court painter to Louis XIII.

Title	Year	Location	City and country	Material	Dimensions	Image
Portrait of King Charles I and Queen Henrietta Maria	1632	Archiepiscopal Palace	Kroměříž, Czechia	Oil on canvas	113,5 × 163 cm	
Portrait of Charles I in his Garter Robes	1632	Gemäldegalerie Alte Meister	Dresden, Germany	Oil on canvas	123 × 96,5 cm	
Portrait of Charles I in Armour	1632	Arundel Castle	Arundel, United Kingdom	Oil on canvas	100 × 81,8 cm	
Portrait of Henrietta Maria	1632	Royal Collection	Windsor, United Kingdom	Oil on canvas	108,6 × 86 cm	
Great Peece	1632	Royal Collection	Windsor, United Kingdom	Oil on canvas	146 × 254 cm	
Portrait of Philip, Lord Wharton	1632	National Gallery of Art	Washington DC, United States	Oil on canvas	132 × 106 cm	
Self-portrait with a sunflower	1632–1633	Private collection of the Duke of Westminster	United Kingdom	Oil on canvas	60 × 73 cm	
Portrait of Henrietta Maria with the dwarf Jeffrey Hudson	1633	National Gallery of Art	Washington DC, United States	Oil on canvas	219,1 × 134,8 cm	
Henry Percy, Baron Percy of Alnwick	1632-1641	Petworth House	Petworth, United Kingdom	Oil on canvas	136 x 108 cm	
Catherine Bruce, Mrs William Murray	1632-1641	Petworth House	Petworth, United Kingdom	Oil on canvas	135 x 108 cm	
Lady Dorothy Percy, Countess of Leicester	1632-1641	Petworth House	Petworth, United Kingdom	Oil on canvas	135 x 108 cm	
Portrait of Thomas Wentworth, 1st Earl of Strafford	1632–1633	Private Collection		Oil on canvas	213,2 × 138,2 cm	
Portrait of Lady Venezia Digby as Prudence	1633–1634	National Portrait Gallery	London, United Kingdom	Oil on canvas	101,1 × 80,2 cm	
Portrait of Lord George Stuart	1633–1634	National Portrait Gallery	London, United Kingdom	Oil on canvas	218,4 × 133,4 cm	
Algernon Percy, 10th Earl of Northumberland his First Wife Lady Anne Cecil, and their Daughter, Lady Catherine Percy	1633-1635	Petworth House	Petworth, United Kingdom	Oil on canvas	135 x 180 cm	
Portrait of the Cardinal-Infante Ferdinand of Austria	1634 circa	Museo del Prado	Madrid, Spain	Oil on canvas	107 x 106 cm	
Portrait of Marie-Claire de Croÿ, Duchess of Havré, and Son	1634	Legion of Honor Museum, Fine Arts Museums of San Francisco	San Francisco, United States	Oil on Canvas	207 x 123.2 cm	Marie Claire de Croÿ, Dutchess d'Havre with Her Son Philippe-Eugène by Anthony van Dyck
Portrait of Charles I with M. de Saint-Antonie, his Riding Master	1636	Royal Collection	Windsor, United Kingdom	Oil on canvas	368,4 × 269,9 cm	
Portrait of James Stuart, duke of Lennox and Richmond	1633–1634	Metropolitan Museum of Art	New York City, United States	Oil on canvas	215,9 × 127,6 cm	
Portrait of William Feilding, 1st Earl of Denbigh	1633–1634	National Gallery	London, United States	Oil on canvas	247,5 × 148,5 cm	
Portrait of Robert Rich, 2nd Earl of Warwick	1634	Metropolitan Museum of Art	New York City, United States	Oil on canvas	208 × 128 cm	
Portrait of Philip Herbert, 4th Earl of Pembroke	1634	National Gallery of Victoria	Melbourne, Australia	Oil on canvas	105,4 × 83,8 cm	
Magistrate of Brussels	1634	Private collection	United Kingdom	Oil on canvas		
Portrait of Francisco de Moncada	1634	Kunsthistorisches Museum	Vienna, Austria	Oil on canvas	111,5 × 86 cm	
Equestrian Portrait of Francisco de Moncada	1634	Louvre	Paris, France	Oil on canvas	307 × 242 cm	
Equestrian Portrait of Francisco de Moncada	1634	Valencia Fine Arts Museum	Valencia, Spain	Oil on canvas	303.5 x 293.5 cm	
Portrait of an Old Woman	1634	Kunsthistorisches Museum	Vienna, Austria	Oil on canvas	117 × 93 cm	
Portrait of Prince Tommaso Francesco of Savoia Carignano in Armour	1634	Gemäldegalerie	Berlin, Germany	Oil on canvas	112 × 103 cm	
Portrait of Prince Tommaso Francesco of Savoia Carignano	1634	Galleria Sabauda	Turin, Italy	Oil on canvas	315 × 236 cm	
Portrait of Quentin Simons	1634–1635	Mauritshuis	The Hague, Netherlands	Oil on canvas	98 × 84 cm	
Magistrates of Brussels	1634–35	Destroyed		Oil on canvas		
Triple Portrait of Charles I	1635	Royal Collection	Windsor, United Kingdom	Oil on canvas	84,5 × 99,7 cm	
Portrait of Queen Henrietta Maria	1635	Metropolitan Museum of Art	New York City, United States	Oil on canvas	105,5 × 84,2 cm	
The Three Eldest Children of Charles I	1635	Galleria Sabauda	Turin, Italy	Oil on canvas	153,7 × 156,8 cm	
The Three Eldest Children of Charles I	1635	Royal Collection	Windsor, United Kingdom	Oil on canvas	133,4 × 151,8 cm	
Self-portrait with Sir Endymion Porter	1635	Museo del Prado	Madrid, Spain	Oil on canvas	119 × 144 cm	
Henry Percy, 9th Earl of Northumberland KG, 'The Wizard Earl'	1635	Petworth House	Petworth, United Kingdom	Oil on canvas	137 x 120 cm	
Portrait of Philip Herbert, 4th Earl of Pembroke and His Family	1635	Wilton House	Wilton, United Kingdom	Oil on canvas	123 × 96,5 cm	
Portrait of Inigo Jones	1635–1636	Hermitage Museum	Saint Petersburg, Russia	Oil on canvas	74,5 × 53,2 cm	
Lady Lucy Percy, Countess of Carlisle	1635-1637	Petworth House	Petworth, United Kingdom	Oil on canvas	135 x 108 cm	
The King Hunting	1635–1638	Louvre	Paris, France	Oil on canvas	266 × 207 cm	
Portrait of a Young Woman with a Cello	1635–1640	Alte Pinakothek	Munich, Germany	Oil on canvas	113 × 93 cm	
Madagascar Portrait (Vienna version)	1635–40	Kunsthistorisches Museum	Vienna, Austria	Oil on canvas		
Mountjoy Blount, 1st Earl of Newport, Lord George Goring and a Page	1635-1640	Petworth House	Petworth, United Kingdom	Oil on canvas	128 x 151 cm	
Portrait of Charles I in Royal Robes	1636	Royal Collection	Windsor, United Kingdom	Oil on canvas	253,4 × 153,6 cm	
Portrait of Charles I on Horseback	1636	National Gallery	London, United Kingdom	Oil on canvas	367 × 292 cm	
Thomas Wentworth, 1st Earl of Strafford	1636	Petworth House	Petworth, United Kingdom	Oil on canvas	134 x 109 cm	
Portrait of Prince Charles Louis and Prince Rupert	1637	Louvre	Paris, France	Oil on canvas	132 × 152 cm	
Portrait of the Five Eldest Children of Charles I	1637	Royal Collection	Windsor, United Kingdom	Oil on canvas	163,2 × 198,8 cm	
Portrait of Dorothy Savage, Viscountess Andover and her sister Elizabeth, Lady Thimbleby	1637	National Gallery	London, United Kingdom	Oil on canvas	132,1 × 149,9 cm	
Portrait of George, Lord Digby and William, Lord Russell	1637	Private collection	Althorp, United Kingdom	Oil on canvas	250 × 157 cm	
The Hon. Anne Boteler, Countess of Newport	1637-1638	Petworth House	Petworth, United Kingdom	Oil on canvas	134 x 107 cm	
Portrait of Charles, Prince of Wales in Armour	1637–1638	Royal Collection	Windsor, United Kingdom	Oil on canvas	153,7 × 131,4 cm	
Portrait of Anne Carr, Countess of Bedford	1638	Petworth House	Petworth, United Kingdom	Oil on canvas	136.2 x 109.9 cm	
Portrait of Lord John and Lord Bernard Stuart	1638	National Gallery	London, United Kingdom	Oil on canvas	237,5 × 146,1 cm	
Portrait of Thomas Killigrew and Lord William Crofts	1638	Royal Collection	Windsor, United Kingdom	Oil on canvas	132,7 × 143,5 cm	
Portrait of Queen Henrietta Maria from the front	1638	Royal Collection	Windsor, United Kingdom	Oil on canvas	78,7 × 65,7 cm	
Portrait of Queen Henrietta Maria, left profile	1638	Royal Collection	Windsor, United Kingdom	Oil on canvas	71,8 × 56,5 cm	
Portrait of William Laud	1638	Hermitage Museum	Saint Petersburg, Russia	Oil on canvas	122 × 93,5 cm	
Portrait of Thomas Killigrew	1638	Chatsworth House	Chatsworth, United Kingdom	Oil on canvas	100 × 82,5 cm	
Portrait of William Howard, 1st Viscount Stafford	1638–1640	Museum of Art	São Paulo, Brazil	Oil on canvas	107 × 82,5 cm	
Portrait of Lady Dorothy Sidney, Lady Spencer, Countess of Sunderland	1639 circa	Petworth House	Petworth, United Kingdom	Oil on canvas	136,2 x 109,2cm	
Madagascar Portrait (Arundel version)	1639	Arundel Castle	Arundel, United Kingdom	Oil on canvas	135 × 206,8 cm	
Portrait of Queen Henrietta Maria, as St Catherine	1639 circa			Oil on canvas		
Portrait of Margaret Lemon	1639	Royal Collection	Windsor, United Kingdom	Oil on canvas	93,3 × 77,8 cm	
Self-portrait	1640 circa	National Portrait Gallery	London, United Kingdom	Oil on canvas		
Mary, Lady Van Dyck	1640 circa	Museo del Prado	Madrid, Spain	Oil on canvas	104 x 81 cm	
Portrait of Sir Kenelm Digby in Armour	1640	National Portrait Gallery	London, United Kingdom	Oil on canvas	117,2 × 91,7 cm	
Rachel de Ruvigny, Countess of Southampton	1640	National Gallery of Victoria	Melbourne, Australia	Oil on canvas	222,4 × 131,6 cm	
Portrait of William II of Nassau-Orange and Princess Mary	1641	Rijksmuseum	Amsterdam, Netherlands	Oil on canvas	182,5 × 142 cm	

== Mythological paintings ==
Mainly celebrated as a portraitist, van Dyck also produced several historical, religious and mythological works.

Title	Year	Location	City and country	Material	Dimensions	Image
Drunken Silenus	1620	Gemäldegalerie Alte Meister	Dresden, Germany	Oil on canvas	107 × 91,5 cm	
Jupiter and Antiope	1620	Museum of Fine Arts	Ghent, Belgium	Oil on canvas	150 × 206 cm	
Jupiter and Antiope	1620	Wallraf-Richartz Museum	Cologne, Germany	Oil on canvas	150 × 206 cm	
Thetis Receiving the Weapons of Achilles from Hephaestus	1630	Kunsthistorisches Museum	Vienna, Austria	Oil on canvas	112x142 cm	
Venus Asks Vulcan to Forge Arms for her Son Aeneas	1630-1632	Louvre	Paris, France	Oil on canvas	220x145 cm	
The Shepherd Paris	1632–1634	Wallace Collection	London, United Kingdom	Oil on canvas	105 × 92 cm	
Cupid and Psyche	1638–1640	Royal Collection	Windsor, United Kingdom	Oil on canvas	188 × 195,6 cm	

== Religious paintings ==
Title	Year	Location	City and country	Material	Dimensions	Image
Saint Rosalia Interceding for the Plague-Stricken of Palermo or Saint Rosalia Taken Up to Heaven	1624 (?)	Alte Pinakothek	Munich, Germany	Oil on canvas		
Saint Rosalia	1625	Museo del Prado	Madrid, Spain	Oil on canvas		
Saint Rosalia Crowned by Angels	1624 (circa)	Menil Collection	Houston, United States	Oil on canvas		
Saint Rosalia Crowned by Angels	1624	Wellington Collection	London, United Kingdom	Oil on canvas		
Saint Rosalia Crowned by Angels	1624 (circa)	Palazzo Abatellis	Palermo, Italy	Oil on canvas		
Pietà	1629 (circa)	Museo del Prado	Madrid, Spain	Oil on canvas	114 x 100 cm	
Coronation of Saint Rosalia	1629	Kunsthistorisches Museum	Vienna, Austria	Oil on canvas		
Saint Rosalia Interceding for the City of Palermo	1629	Museo de Arte de Ponce	Ponce, United States	oil on canvas		
The Virgin Presenting Saint Rosalia to the Trinity	1624-1625	Alte Pinakothek	Munich, Germany	Oil on canvas		
Saint Jerome	1615–1616	Liechtenstein Museum	Vienna, Austria	Oil on canvas	158 × 131 cm	
Abraham and Isaac	1617 circa	Národní Gallery	Prague, Czechia	Oil on canvas	119 × 178 cm	
Christ's Entry into Jerusalem	1617 circa	Indianapolis Museum of Art	Indianapolis, United States	Oil on canvas	151 × 229 cm	
The Mystic Marriage of Saint Catherine	1618-1620	Museo del Prado	Madrid, Spain	Oil on canvas	124 x 174 cm	
Saint Martin Dividing his Cloak	1618–1620	Church of St Martin	Zaventem, Belgium	Oil on panel	171,6 × 158 cm	
Apostle	1618 circa	Staatliche Museen	Berlin, Germany	Oil on oak panel	61 × 49 cm	
Apostle with Folded Hands	1618–1620	Staatliche Museen	Berlin, Germany	Pencil on oak panel	57 × 45 cm	
The Brazen Serpent	1618–1620	Museo del Prado	Madrid, Spain	Oil on canvas	205 × 235 cm	
Christ Crowned with Thorns	1618–1620	Museo del Prado	Madrid, Spain	Oil on canvas	223 × 196 cm	
Pentecost	1618–1620	Staatliche Museen	Berlin, Germany	Oil on canvas	265 × 221 cm	
The Lamentation	1618–20	Kunsthistorisches Museum	Vienna, Austria	Oil on canvas		
Lamentation	1618-1620	Museo del Prado	Madrid, Spain	Oil on canvas	203 x 170 cm	
Sampson and Delilah	1618–1620	Dulwich Picture Gallery	London, United Kingdom	Oil on canvas	149 × 229,5 cm	
The Lamentation	1619 circa	Ashmolean Museum	Oxford, United Kingdom	Oil on canvas		
Saint Ambrose barring Theodosius from Milan Cathedral	1619–1620	National Gallery	London, United Kingdom	Oil on canvas	149 × 113,2 cm	
The Betrayal of Christ	1620	Museo del Prado	Madrid, Spain	Oil on canvas	344 × 249 cm	
The Betrayal of Christ	1620	Bristol Museum and Art Gallery	Bristol, United Kingdom	Oil on canvas	274 × 222 cm	
The Betrayal of Christ	1620	Minneapolis Institute of Arts	Minneapolis, United States	Oil on canvas	142 × 113 cm	
The Saints John's	1620	Real Academia de Bellas Artes de San Fernando	Madrid, Spain	Oil on panel	63 X 49 cm	
Susanna and the Elders	1620–1622 (circa)	Alte Pinakothek	Munich, Germany	Oil on canvas	194 x 44 cm	
Christ and The Adulteress	1620-1622 (circa)	BBVA Collection	Madrid, Spain	Oil on canvas	169 x 252 cm	
Christ and the Adulteress	1620-1622 (circa)	Hospital de la Venerable Orden Tercera.	Madrid, Spain	Oil on canvas	191 x 235 cm	
Madonna and Child	1620- 1625	Galleria Nazionale di Parma	Parma, Italy	Oil on canvas	62.5 x 52.5 cm	
Virgin and Child	1621-1622	Museum Cerralbo	Madrid, Spain	Oil on canvas	98 x 84 cm	
Martyrdom of Saint Sebastian	1621-1627	Real Monasterio de San Lorenzo del Escorial	Madrid, Spain	Oil on canvas	191.5 x 141.5 cm	
Virgin and Child with Repentant Sinners	1621-1627	Real Academia de Bellas Artes de San Fernando	Madrid, Spain	Oil on canvas	127 x 137 cm	
Saint Rosalie Interceding for the Plague–Stricken of Palermo	1624	Metropolitan Museum of Art	New York City, United States	Oil on canvas	99,7 × 73,7 cm	
Christ on the Cross	1627	Carmen Thyssen-Bornemisza Collection	Madrid, Spain	Oil on panel	105.3 x 73 cm	
Crucifixion	1628–1630	Kunsthistorisches Museum	Vienna, Austria	Oil on canvas	133 × 101 cm	
The Lamentation	1628-1630	Alte Pinakothek	Munich, Germany	Oil on canvas	109 × 149 cm	
The Lamentation	1629 circa	Royal Museum of Fine Arts Antwerp	Antwerp, Belgium	Oil on canvas		
The Lamentation	1629–1630	Destroyed, once held at the Kaiser Friedrich Museum	Berlin, Germany	Oil on canvas	220 × 166 cm	
The Vision of the Blessed Hermann Joseph	1630	Kunsthistorisches Museum	Vienna, Austria	Oil on canvas	160 × 128 cm	
Sampson and Delilah	1630	Kunsthistorisches Museum	Vienna, Austria	Oil on canvas	146 × 254 cm	
Madonna and Child with Two Donors	1630	Louvre	Paris, France	Oil on canvas	250 × 191 cm	
Rest on the Flight into Egypt	1630	Alte Pinakothek	Munich, Germany	Oil on canvas	134,7 × 114,8 cm	
Madonna with Partridges	1632	Hermitage Museum	Saint Petersburg, Russia	Oil on canvas	215 × 285.5 cm	
The Lamentation	1635	Royal Museum of Fine Arts Antwerp	Antwerp, Belgium	Oil on canvas		
The Lamentation	1640	Bilbao Fine Arts Museum	Bilbao, Spain	Oil on canvas		

== Notes ==
- All information on dimensions, location and dates are taken from the two books in the bibliography.

== Bibliography ==
- Christopher Brown, Antonie Van Dyck 1599–1641, Milano, RCS Libri, 1999, ISBN 88-17-86060-3.
- Erik Larsen, L'opera completa di Van Dyck 1626–1641, Milano, Rizzoli, 1980.
