= The Betrayal of Christ (van Dyck, Madrid) =

Painting by Anthony van Dyck

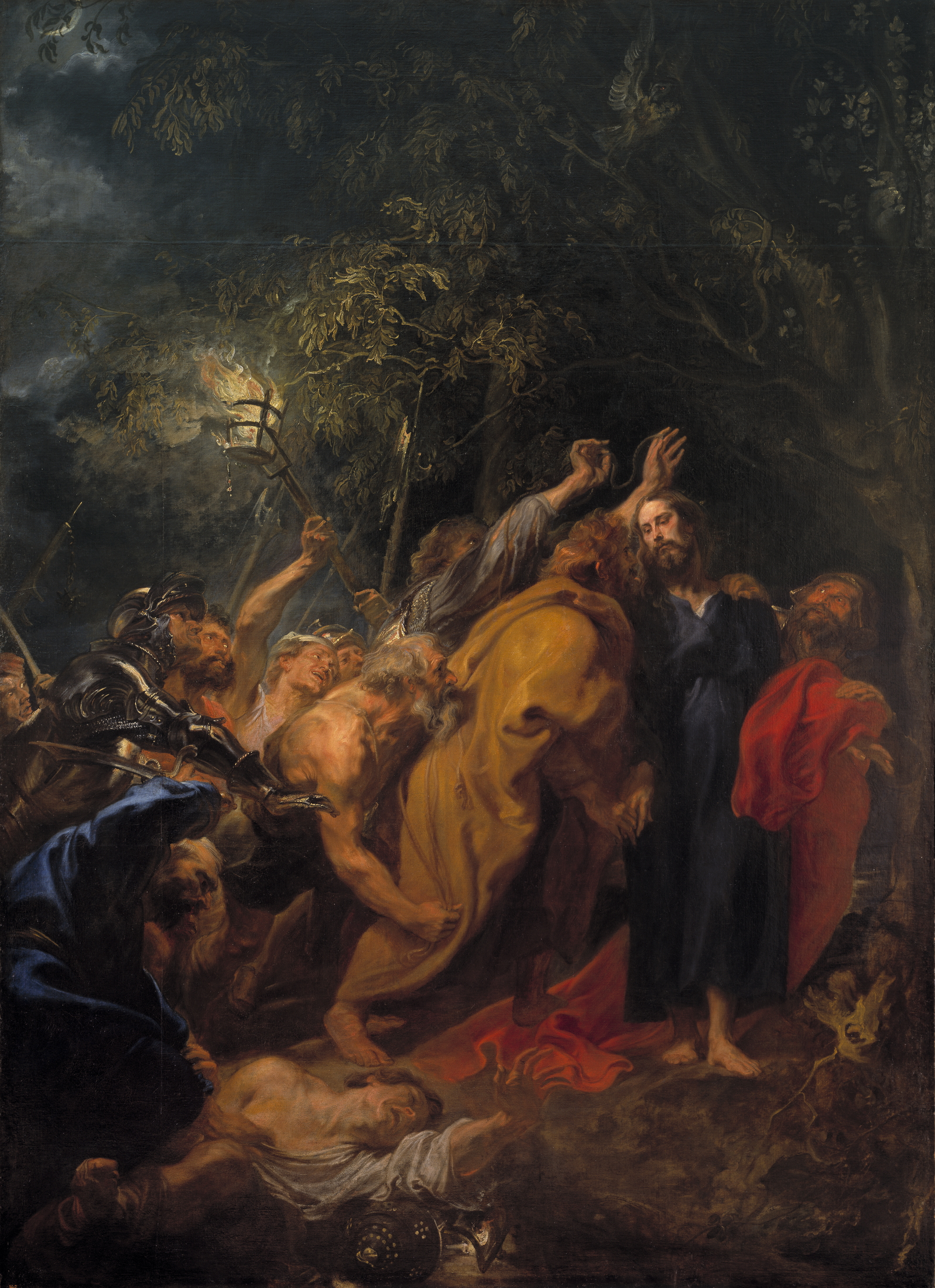
The Betrayal of Christ (c. 1620) by Anthony van Dyck. Museo del Prado.

The Betrayal of Christ is a c. 1620 painting by the Flemish painter Anthony van Dyck now at Museo del Prado in Madrid. He also produced two other versions of the same subject at around the same time, now in Bristol and Minneapolis.

== See also ==
- List of paintings by Anthony van Dyck
