= The Betrayal of Christ (van Dyck, Bristol) =

Painting by Anthony van Dyck

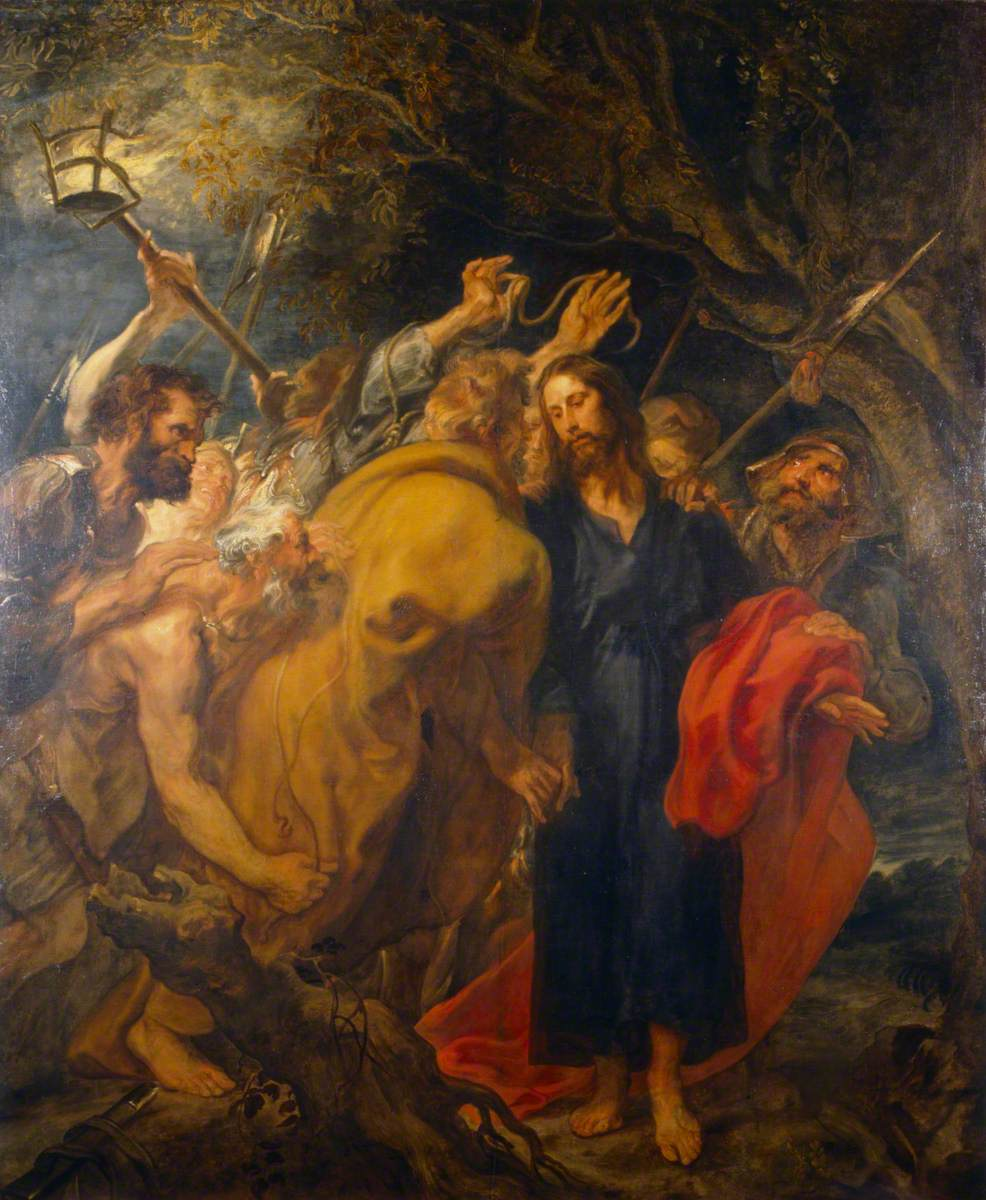
The Betrayal of Christ (c. 1618-1620) by Anthony van Dyck

The Betrayal of Christ is a c. 1618-20 painting by Anthony van Dyck. He also produced two other versions of the same subject at around the same time, now in Madrid and Minneapolis.

It was acquired by Paul Methuen. He bequeathed it to his cousin and godson Paul Methuen in 1757, who displayed it at Corsham Court. It remained in the family until 1984, when it was accepted by the UK government in lieu of inheritance tax and allocated to Bristol Museum and Art Gallery, which continues to hang it at Corsham Court. It is currently in storage.

== See also ==
- List of paintings by Anthony van Dyck
