= Margaret Lemon =

English musician and artist's model (c. 1614-1643)

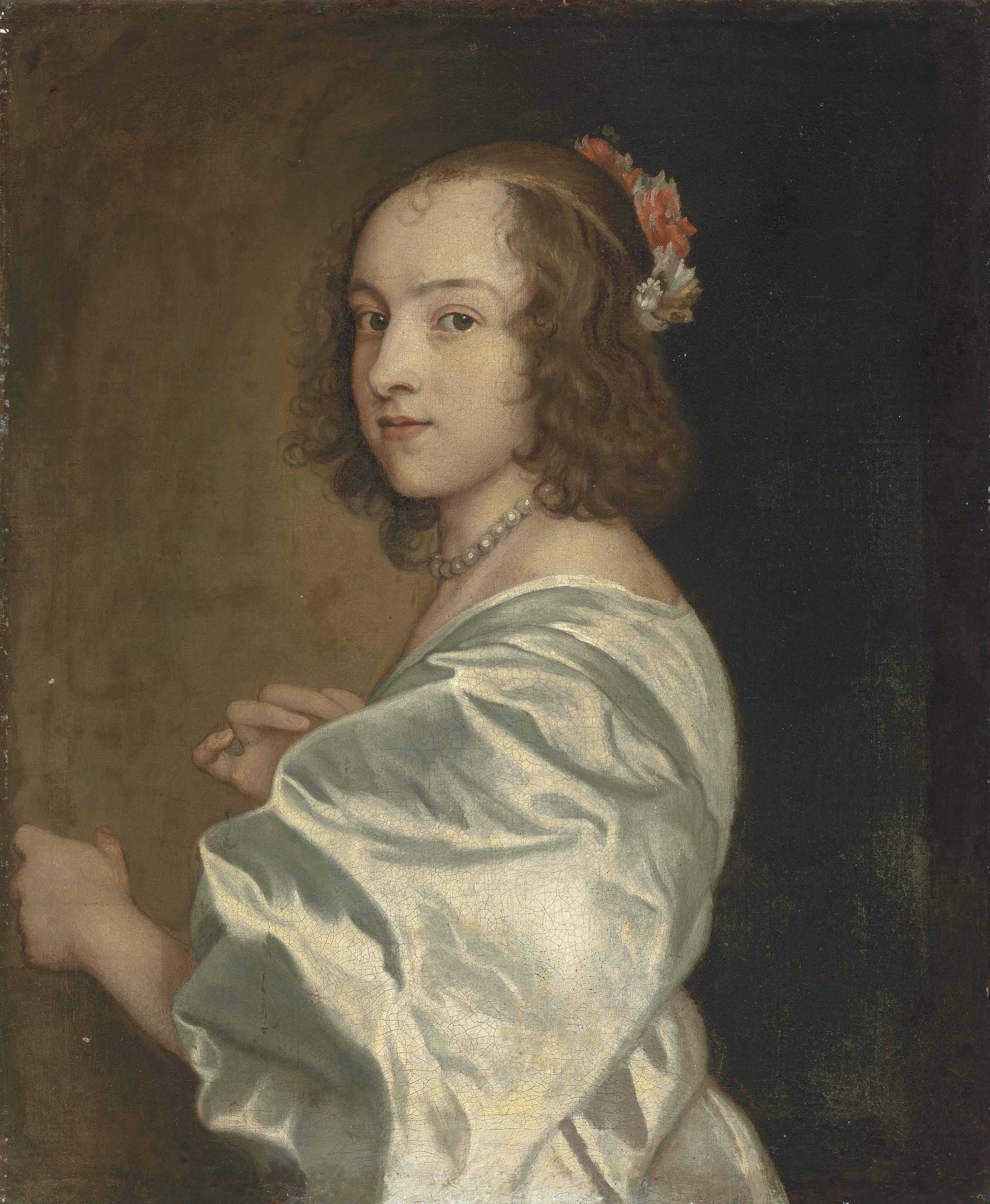
- Born: c. 1614; Kingdom of England
- Died: c. 14 December 1643 (Age 28 or 29)
- Occupations: musician,model
- Known for: most painted female commoner of the 17th century
- Partner: Anthony van Dyck

Margaret Lemon (born c. 1614) was an English musician and artist's model. She was the most painted female commoner of the seventeenth century, and she was the partner of Anthony van Dyck.

== Life ==
It is known that Lemon was English, but her date of birth can only be guessed by estimating her age in paintings of her. She is believed to have had Flemish ancestry and she was probably a courtesan when she met Anthony van Dyck after he came to work, again, in England in 1632. She was a musician who could play the viol. Her life story is recreated based on gossip rather than records.

She is known to have been in London from 1629. Although she was extravagant with money she was given the responsibility of looking after her partner's houses in Blackfriars and at his suite of rooms at Eltham Palace. Van Dyck entertained his rich patrons at his houses including Charles I of England. It is not recorded that she and the King met although Charles later bought a portrait of her.

She was the model for Van Dyck's painting based on the classical idea of the "Modest Venus". The painting is in the British Royal Collection and it shows Lemon trying to, modestly, cover her breasts.

Lemon was said to have had Endymion Porter as a guest while Van Dyck was away, but she expected Van Dyck to be faithful. Wenceslaus Hollar said that she tried to put Van Dyck's career in jeopardy when she attempted to bite off his thumb in a fit of jealousy.

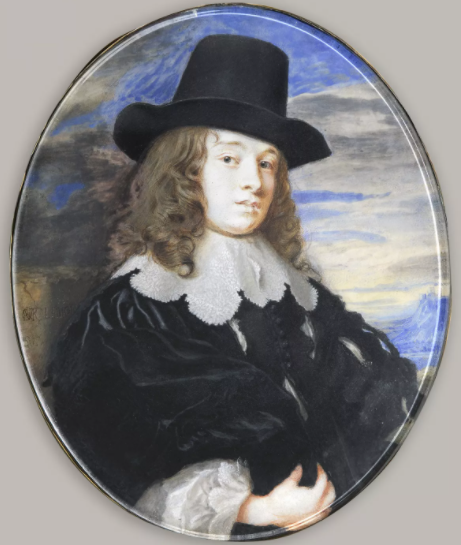
Watercolour miniature of Margaret Lemon by Samuel Cooper c.1636

Lemon's relationship with Van Dyck ended and he married Mary Ruthven, who was considered more respectable, in February 1640. His new wife came from a Scottish aristocratic family and she was a lady-in-waiting to Queen Henrietta Maria. Van Dyck died two years later, but Lemon continued as a model attracting attention from younger ambitious painters including Peter Lely, Samuel Cooper, Cornelis Jansen van Ceulen and Adriaen Hanneman.

== Legacy ==
There is a portrait of her in the Frick Collection which was made in about 1638 by Van Dyck and which was lost for some years. There is another in the Royal Collection which is kept at Hampton Court Palace. In 2022 there were eight portraits of her in the National Portrait Gallery which were "after Anthony van Dyck". Peter Lely's painting of her, in "The Concert", is in the Courtauld Institute. Contemporary copies and engravings of Van Dyck's painting of her as Flora exist although the original is lost. The historian Susan E. James says that she was the most painted female commoner of the seventeenth century.
