= The Three Eldest Children of Charles I (Turin) =

1635 painting by Anthony van Dyck

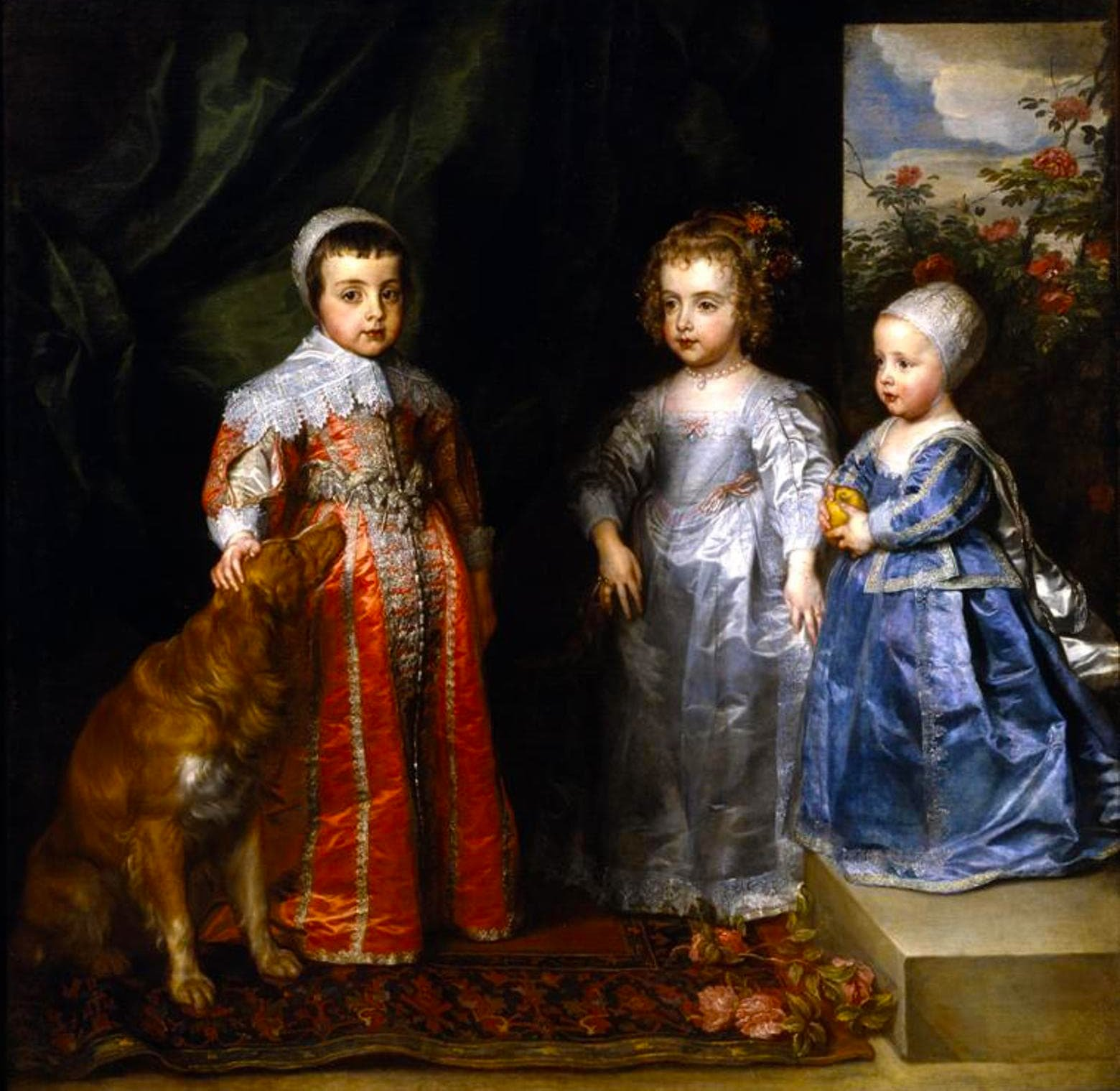

The Three Eldest Children of Charles I is an oil painting on canvas of 1635 by Anthony van Dyck in the Galleria Sabauda in Turin.

It shows Charles II, Mary and James II, the three eldest children of Charles I and his wife Henrietta Maria of France, with a spaniel to the left. It was commissioned by their mother to send to her sister Christine of France in Turin.

== See also ==
- List of paintings by Anthony van Dyck
