= El Playón =

El Playón may refer to:

- El Playón, Santander, a municipality in Colombia
- El Playón, Venezuela
