= Feast of Saint Rosalia =

Annual religious festival in Sicily, Italy

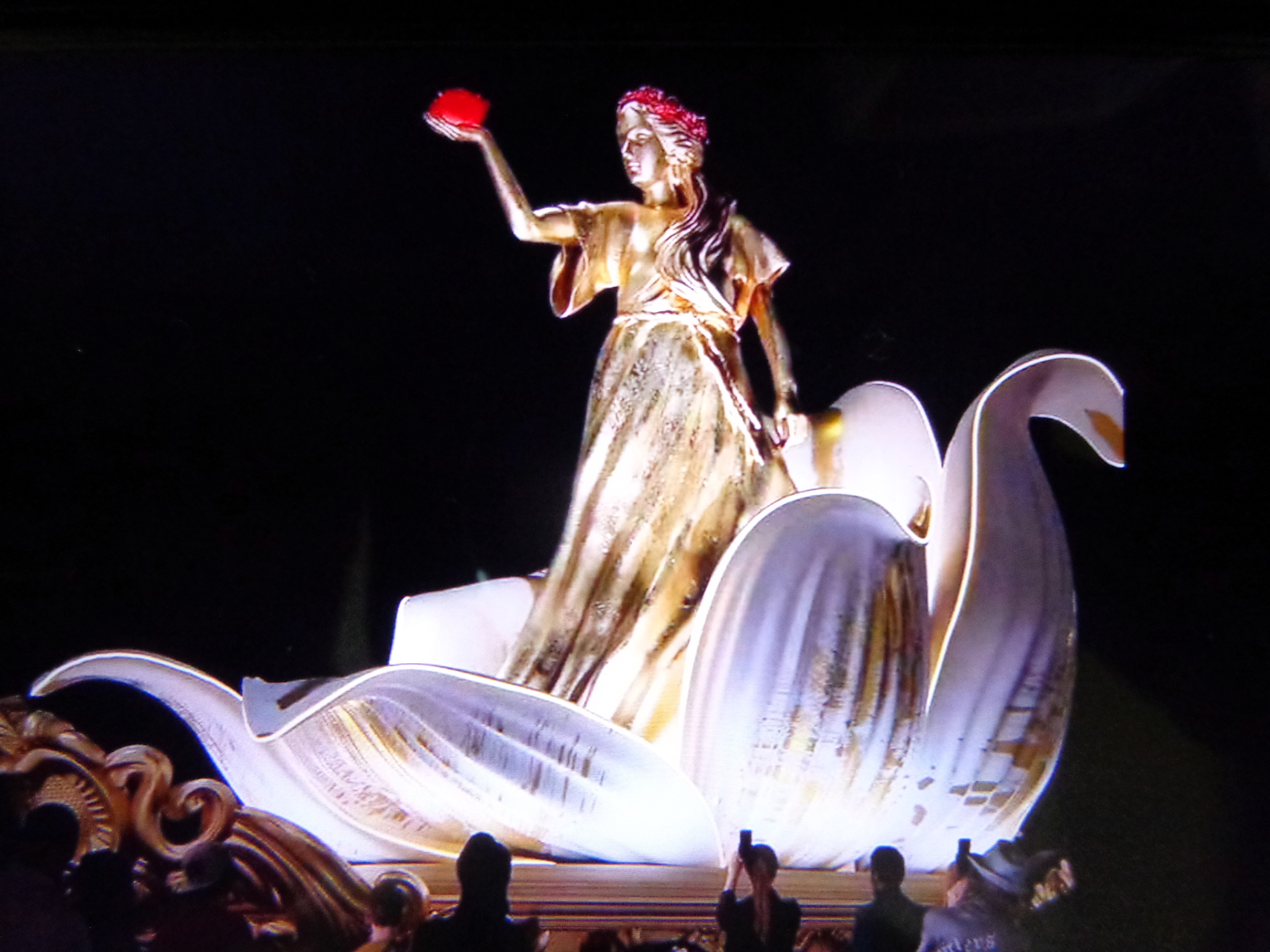
triumphal chariot, 2024

The Feast of Saint Rosalia (Italian: Festino di Santa Rosalia; Sicilian: Fistinu di Santa Rusulia) is an annual religious festival held in Palermo every July (10-15) since 1624. It is the only Sicilian religious celebration officially recognized as part of Italy's intangible cultural heritage by the Central Institute for Demoethnoanthropology (IDEA).

Saint Rosalia's liturgical feast day, however, is celebrated on 4 September at the sanctuary dedicated to the saint on Mount Pellegrino in Palermo, where she is traditionally believed to have died in 1170.

== The Origins of the Feast of Saint Rosalia ==
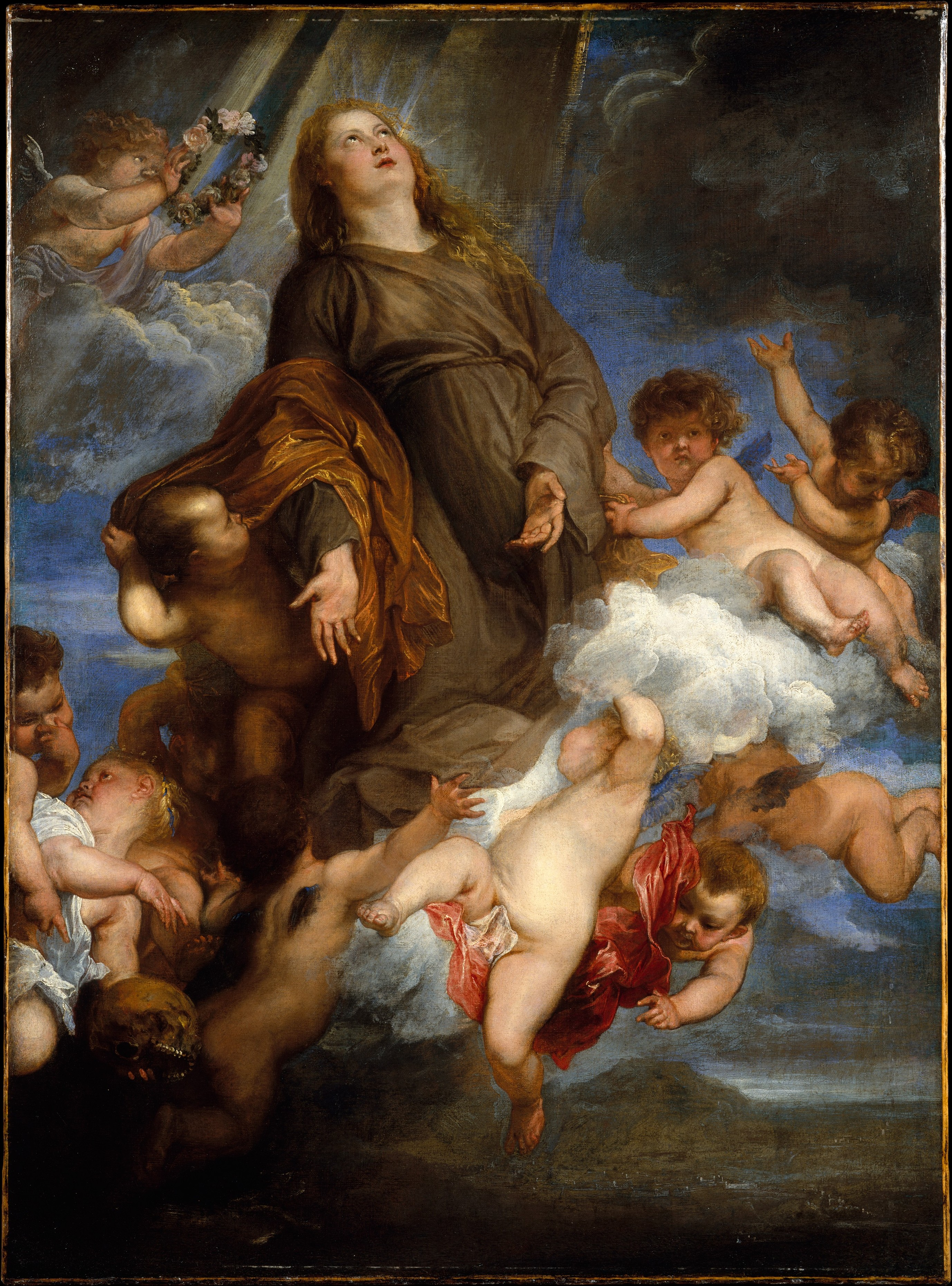
Anthony van Dyck, Saint Rosalie Interceding for the Plague-stricken of Palermo (1624).

In 1624, the Viceroy of Sicily, Emanuele Filiberto of Savoy, who resided in Palermo, allowed a vessel arriving from Tunis and commanded by the Tunisian Moor Muhammad Calavà, who was suspected of carrying the plague, to enter the city's harbour. According to tradition, the ship carried numerous rich and valuable gifts as well as freed Christian slaves. The disease subsequently spread among rats, through the city's markets and outlying districts, and eventually reached the urban centre. As the epidemic worsened, the population of Palermo continued to fall ill and die despite invoking the city's patron saints and the patronesses of its four historic quarters — Saint Agatha, Saint Christina, Saint Oliva, and Saint Nympha — but, according to tradition, no miracle occurred.

One of those affected was Girolama La Gattuta, a 47-year-old embroiderer from Ciminna, who was suffering from a severe malignant fever at Palermo's Great Hospital. On 15 October 1623, while gravely ill, she reportedly experienced a vision of a nun dressed in white, surrounded by flashes of lightning. The figure touched her mouth, after which she felt as though she had been "filled with water". The nun identified herself as Saint Rosalia and instructed Girolama to go to Mount Pellegrino to fulfil a vow.

According to tradition, Girolama was miraculously cured three days later. However, she did not travel to Mount Pellegrino or fulfil her vow, and subsequently contracted malaria once again. On 26 May 1624, the day of Pentecost, although still ill, she climbed Mount Pellegrino accompanied by her husband, Benedetto Lo Gattuto, their friend Vito Amodeo, a 37-year-old sailor from Trapani, and Amodeo's wife. There she drank clear water dripping from the rock walls of a cave, located beside the ancient Church of Saint Rosalia and covered externally by vegetation, and was said to have been miraculously healed. She then fell asleep and dreamed of the Virgin Mary, dressed in white and holding the Christ Child, wearing a coral necklace. The Virgin instructed her to excavate the cave, where she would find "a saint, a treasure". At the back of the cave, Girolama saw a young woman dressed in a long tunic, kneeling in prayer with a rosary in her hands.

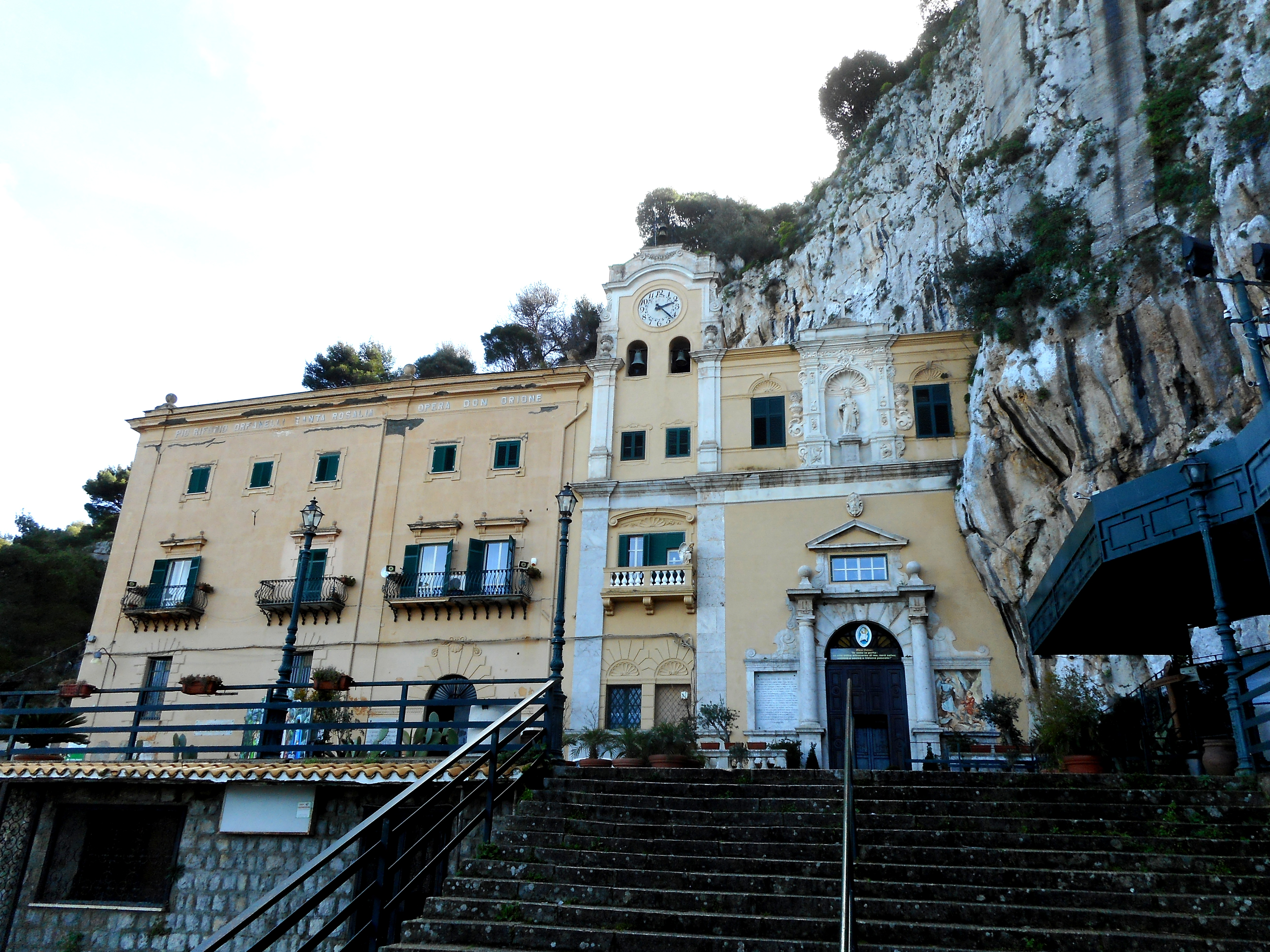
Sanctuary of Santa Rosalia, Mount Pellegrino.

After awakening, Girolama identified a large stone in the cave and, through her persistent insistence, excavations began in early June. The work was carried out by Girolama herself, together with her husband, local farmers, and Franciscan friars from the nearby convent. Meanwhile, following the death of Viceroy Emanuele Filiberto of Savoy from the plague on 3 August 1624, the Senate of Palermo prohibited residents from leaving their homes or the city without an official pass issued by a notary.

On 15 July 1624, excavations at the site indicated by Girolama uncovered a set of exceptionally white human bones beneath a large flat slab of marble and calcarenite, partially enclosed in calcareous concretions. Earlier in the excavation, darker bones — believed to have belonged to a secular friar and a novice — as well as goat bones had also been discovered. Owing to their white colour and the delicate proportions of the skull, the newly discovered remains were identified as those of a woman. Contemporary accounts also claimed that the bones emitted a strong floral fragrance and that the casket containing them was remarkably light, so much so that it could reportedly be carried by a single man.

The remains were cleaned and transferred to the chapel of the Archbishop's Palace, the residence of Cardinal and Archbishop of Palermo Giannettino Doria. After they were examined by Jesuit anatomists led by Father Giordano Cascini — who later wrote the first biography of Saint Rosalia based on historical evidence and oral traditions identifying the remains as those of a young woman — Doria became convinced of their authenticity. He subsequently ordered that the relics be carried in procession through the streets of Palermo.

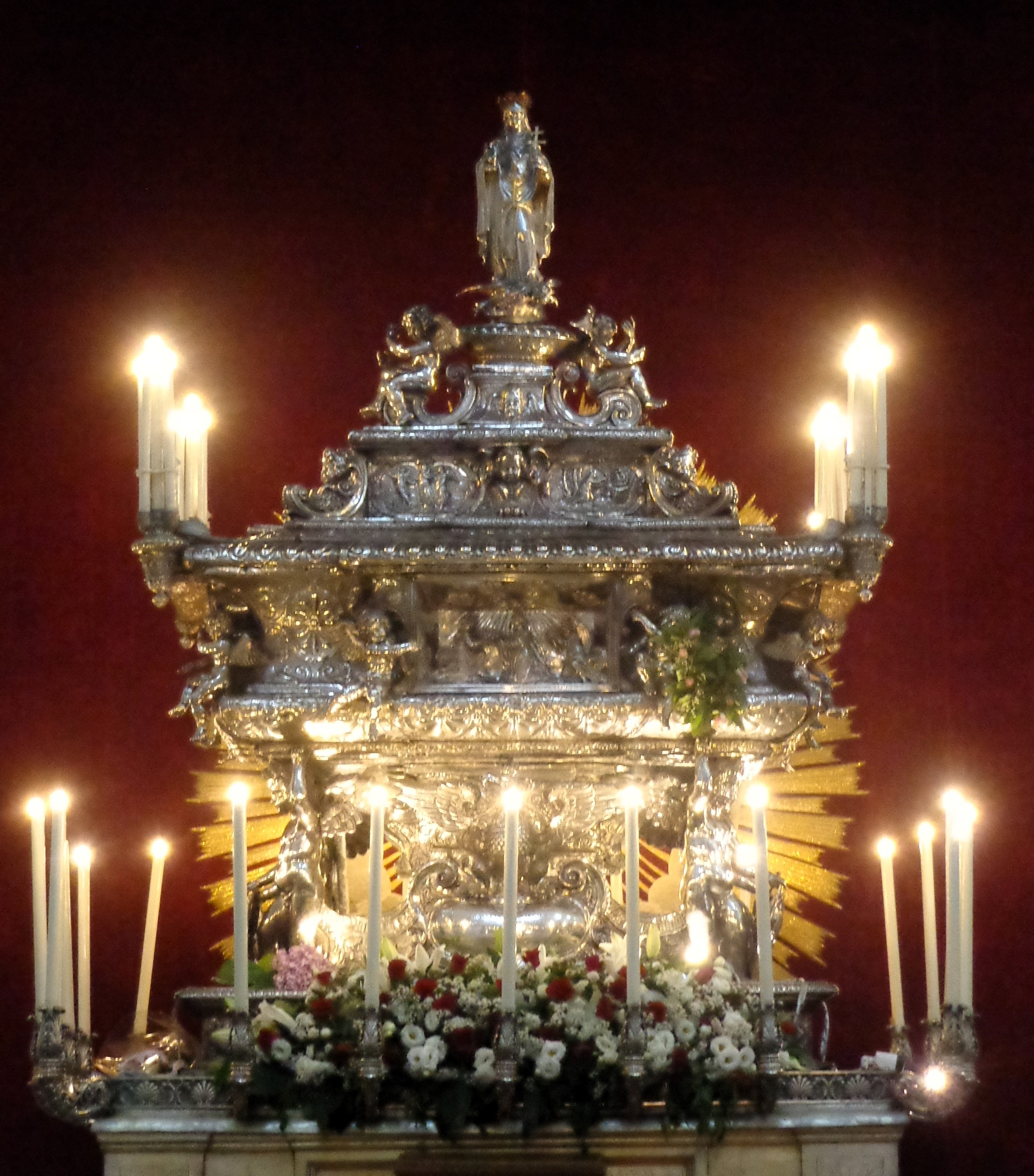
Silver urn of Saint Rosalia, Palermo Cathedral.

On 13 February 1625 Saint Rosalia appeared on Mount Pellegrino to a soapmaker named Vincenzo Bonello (or Bonelli), who lived in the Monte di Pietà district of Palermo. Bonello, whose fifteen-year-old wife had died of the plague, was reportedly contemplating suicide. The saint is said to have prevented him from taking his own life and told him that the epidemic would end only if her remains were carried in procession through the city and the Te Deum was sung, in accordance with a promise made by the Virgin Mary.

Following the apparition, Bonello summoned his confessor, the parish priest of the Church of Sant'Ippolito, and recounted what he had experienced. Three days later, he contracted the plague and died. According to the tradition, he had already received the miracle promised by the saint.

After a further examination of the remains by anatomists, Archbishop Giannettino Doria was informed that the bones were those of a woman and were therefore identified as those of Rosalia, who was believed to have been the only woman to have lived as a hermit on Mount Pellegrino.

On 9 June 1625 Doria led a solemn procession through the streets of Palermo carrying the saint's relics, accompanied by the clergy, the Palermo Senate, and prominent citizens. According to tradition, as the relics passed through the city and the Te Deum was sung, the plague came to an end, with no further cases recorded thereafter, and many of those afflicted were said to have recovered. Since then, Saint Rosalia has been venerated as the patron saint and protector of Palermo, and popular tradition also attributes to her the protection of the city from earthquakes, storms, and other natural disasters.

== The Feast ==
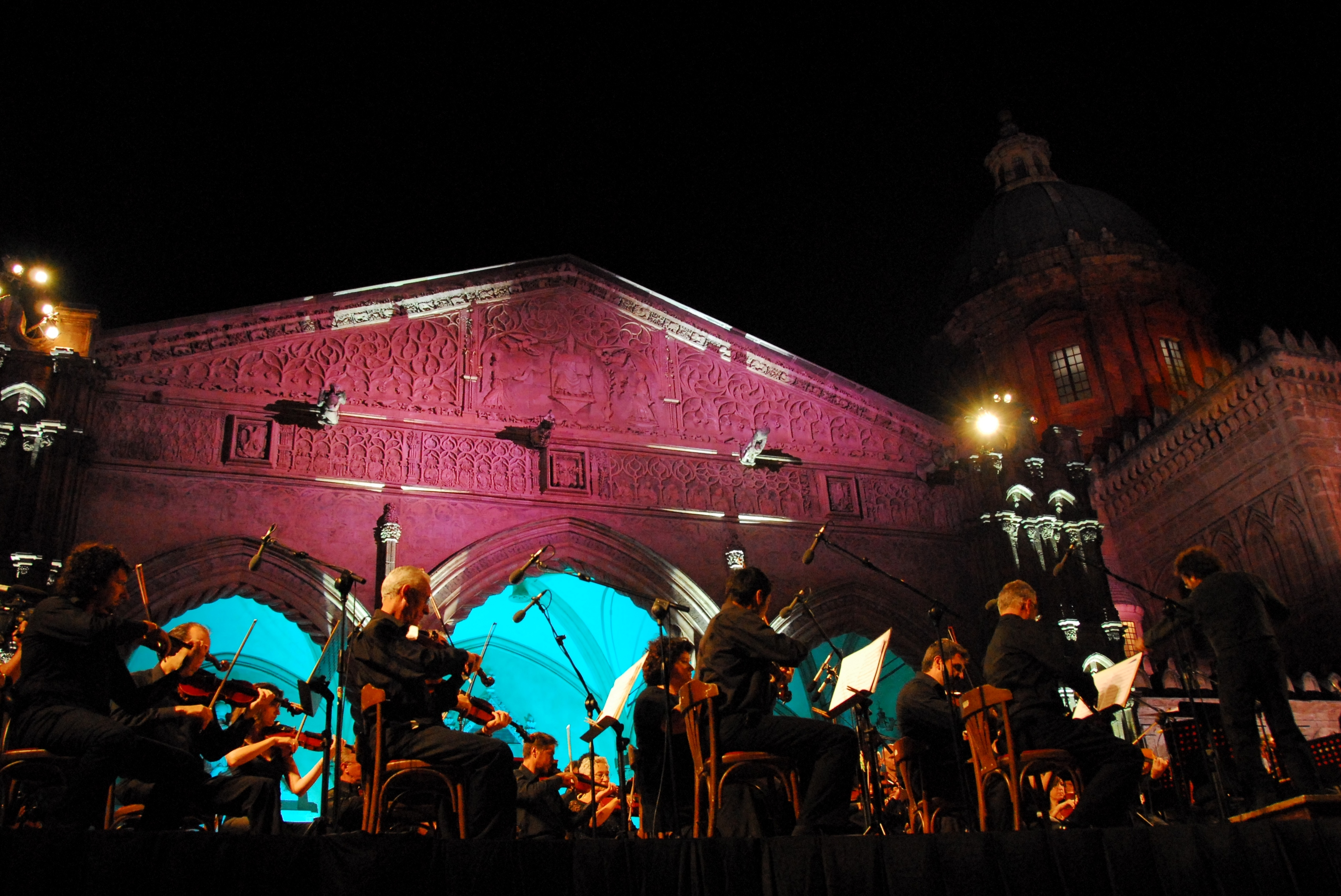
The Sicilian Symphony Orchestra, Palermo Cathedral, 2007.

On the night of 14 July, the artistic and popular celebrations reach their climax with a large “popular procession”. Starting from the Royal Palace and the Palermo Cathedral, the procession follows the ancient Cassaro thoroughfare towards the sea, passing through Porta Felice, along an ideal route symbolising the passage from death (the plague) to life (the light of the fireworks by the seafront).

Amid music, songs and various choreographed performances, a large triumphal chariot, renewed every year, is pulled through the streets. A statue of the saint, also newly created each year, is placed on top of the chariot. At the Quattro Canti, there is a traditional moment in which the mayor in office lays flowers at the feet of the statue of the saint and exclaims: “Viva Palermo e Santa Rosalia!” (“Long live Palermo and Saint Rosalia!”). The procession then reaches the Foro Italico, where a fireworks display takes place.

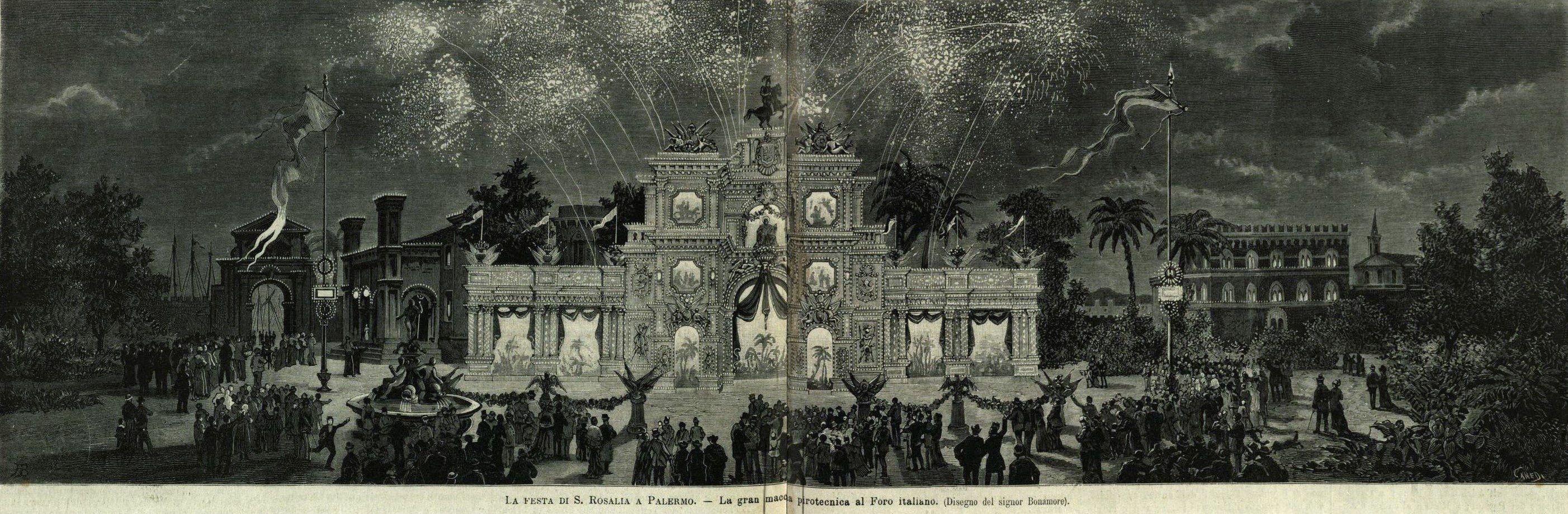
Pyrotechnic machine, 1880.

Since the late 1990s the event, which was once a procession involving all civil, military and religious authorities, has evolved into a fully fledged theatrical performance. It features spectacular lighting effects, videomapping and acrobatic dances depicting the final days of the plague in Palermo. The performance has an itinerant character: after being staged in the city, it is presented in various locations around the world in order to recover part of the costs incurred for the organisation of the entire Festino. Among the cinema personalities who have taken part in the Festino over the years are Pino Caruso, Luigi Maria Burruano, Luigi Lo Cascio, Eleonora Abbagnato, Tony Sperandeo, Lando Buzzanca, Dario Aita and Giusy Buscemi.

15 July, a solemn day in the city, marks the culmination of the religious celebrations. During that procession, while the Te Deum was sung, the “end of the plague” was believed to have occurred, with the decline of the contagion and the beginning of public recoveries among those affected by the disease. Throughout the day, several solemn Masses are celebrated in the Cathedral. In the afternoon, around 6 p.m., the procession of the Sacred Relics of Saint Rosalia begins.

== The triumphal chariot ==
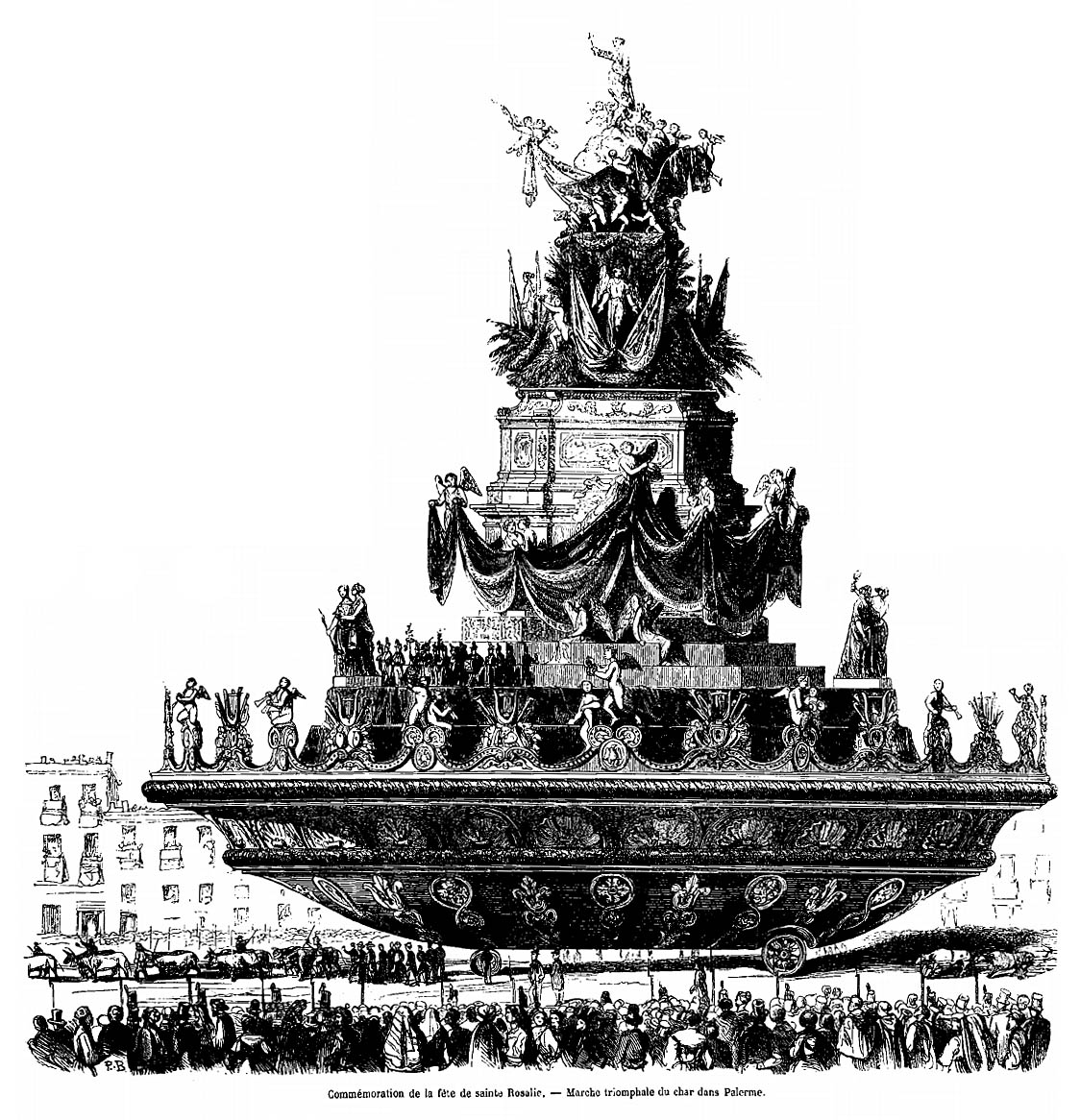
Triumphal chariot, 1850.

The four small floats used for the earliest processions were replaced in 1686 by a large triumphal float. The float, conceived as a metaphor for the saint’s triumph, soon became the central element of the celebration. It immediately reached considerable dimensions and was replaced several times in the pursuit of increasingly solemn and spectacular effects. Between the 18th and 19th centuries, many renowned architects from Palermo worked on its design.

In 1701, under the direction of architect Paolo Amato, the float took the form of a vessel for the first time, an idea that was later revived in modern versions. During the Bourbon period, until 1860, the 18th-century float was preserved for a long time, displaying the opulence of the royal court. On the occasion of the Unification of Italy, a new float was created, consisting of a large basin decorated with putti. In 1896, inspired by Giuseppe Pitrè, a float of such large dimensions was built that it could not pass through the streets of the city centre and had to travel along the outer streets of Palermo. In 1924, for the third centenary of the discovery of the relics, a stationary float was created, featuring a central tower 25 metres high.

In 1974, for the 350th edition of the Festino, a new float was created based on the 1701 designs by architect Paolo Amato. Inspired by the Baroque style and shaped like a vessel, it reached a height of ten metres and a length of nine metres, and was pulled by oxen. From this point onwards, the float itself became a small choreographic stage.

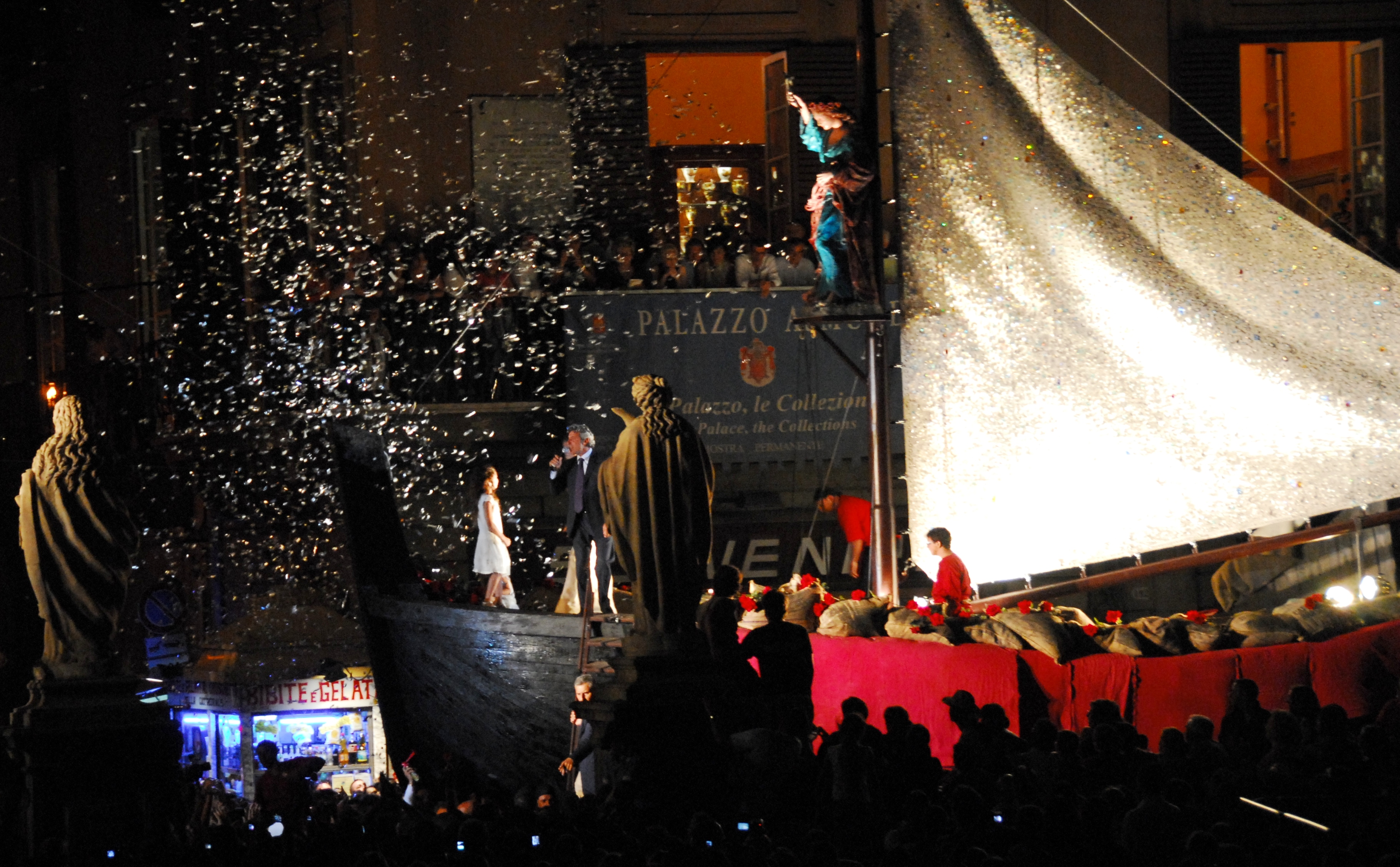
The chariot of Jannis Kounellis, 2007.

In 2000 and 2001 the float with silver wings from the 1998 edition, designed by stage designer Lupo, was used again. The design incorporated a new prow in the shape of a Saracen figure. The float crossed the ocean and took part in the Columbus Day parades in 2003 and 2004; it is currently preserved in New York City.

In 2007 a new float was created from a design by Jannis Kounellis, marking a departure from Baroque forms in favour of the simpler shape of a traditional tuna-fishing boat. Its sail was entirely inlaid with Swarovski crystals.

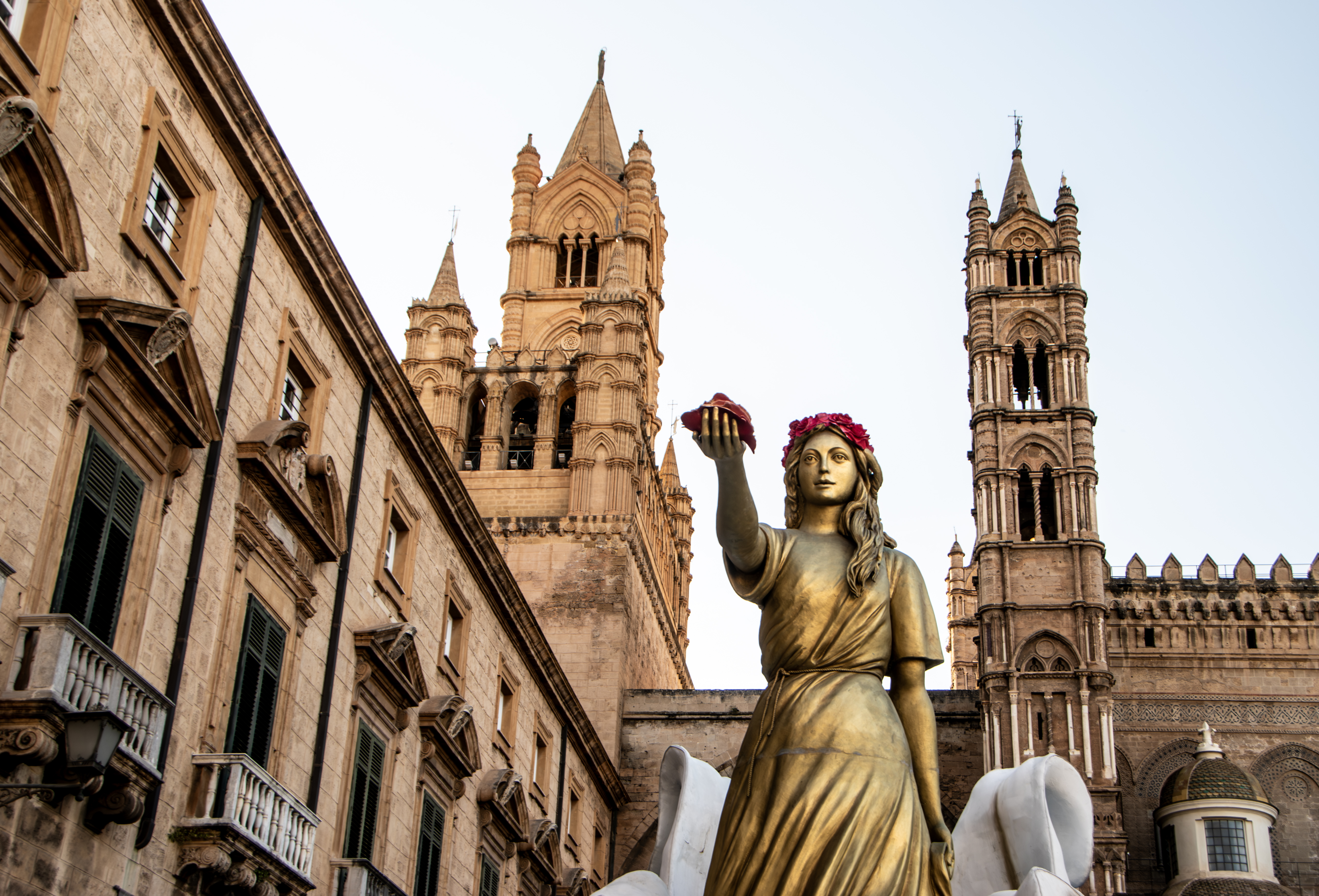
The statue from the 2024 triumphal chariot at Palermo Cathedral.

In 2024 the 400th edition of the Feast of Saint Rosalia was dedicated to the theme of hope. For the occasion, a new chariot was created in the shape of a carriage, entirely covered in gold, with bas-relief decorations depicting lilies on its sides and large roses on its four wheels. It was pulled by fifteen men and carried a large statue of the saint placed inside a giant lily. The 400th Festino received an award at the Bea World Festival 2024, ranking among the three best events in the world.
