= The Coronation of Saint Rosalia =

1629 painting by Anthony van Dyck

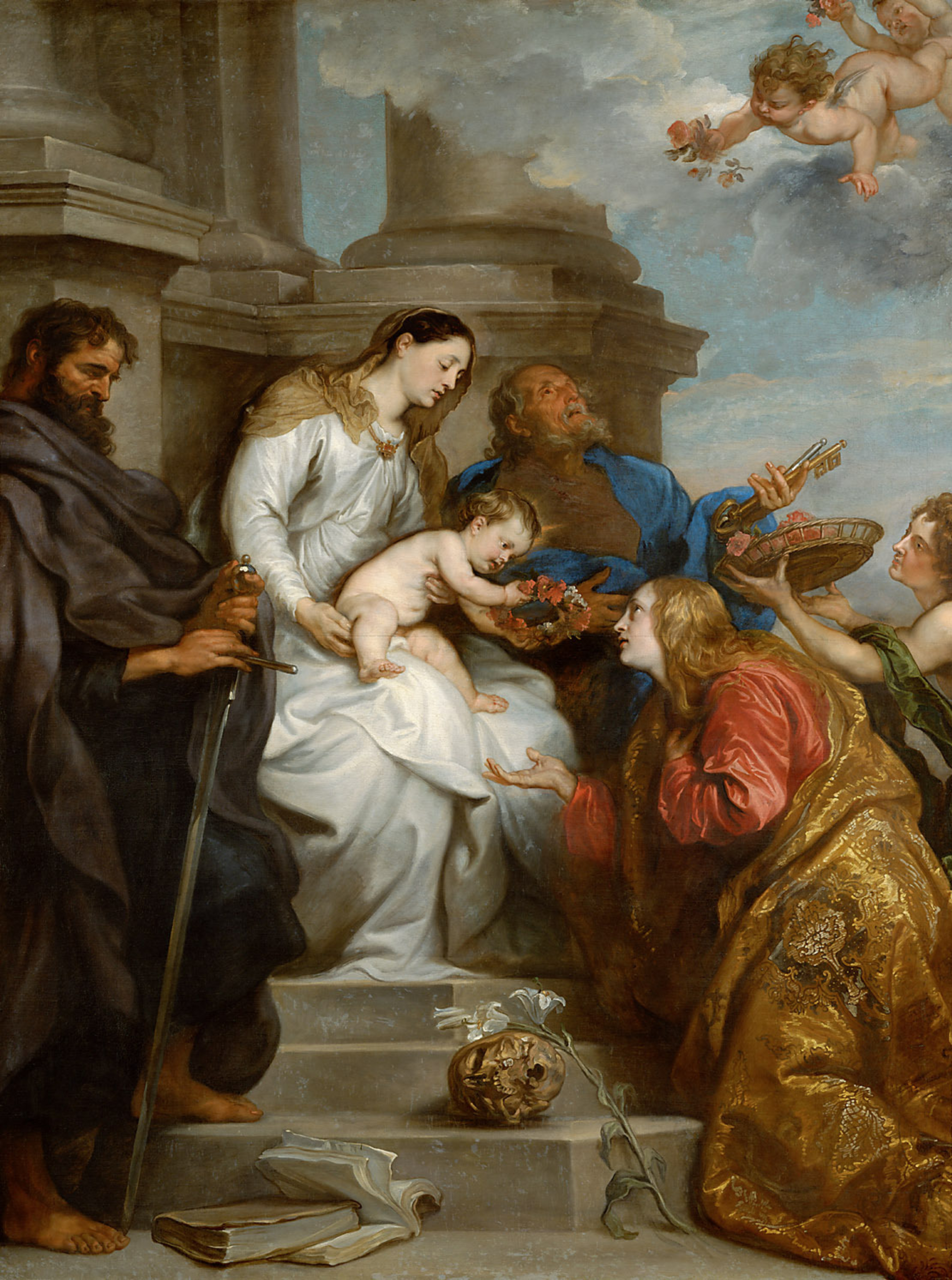
- Artist: Anthony van Dyck
- Year: 1629
- Type: oil on canvas
- Dimensions: 275 cm × 210 cm (108 in × 83 in)
- Location: Kunsthistorisches Museum, Vienna

The Coronation of Saint Rosalia or Madonna and Child with Saints Rosalia, Peter and Paul is an oil on canvas painting made by Anthony van Dyck in 1629.

It and the compositionally similar The Vision of the Blessed Hermann Joseph (1630) were both painted for the chapel of the Fraternity of the senior bachelors (Sodaliteit van de Bejaerde Jongmans in Flemish) in Antwerp's Jesuit church, then named the Saint Ignatius Church but later renamed the St. Charles Borromeo Church. Both paintings remained there until 1776, when empress Maria Theresa of Austria acquired them, taking them to Vienna, where they both now hang in the Kunsthistorisches Museum.

== History ==
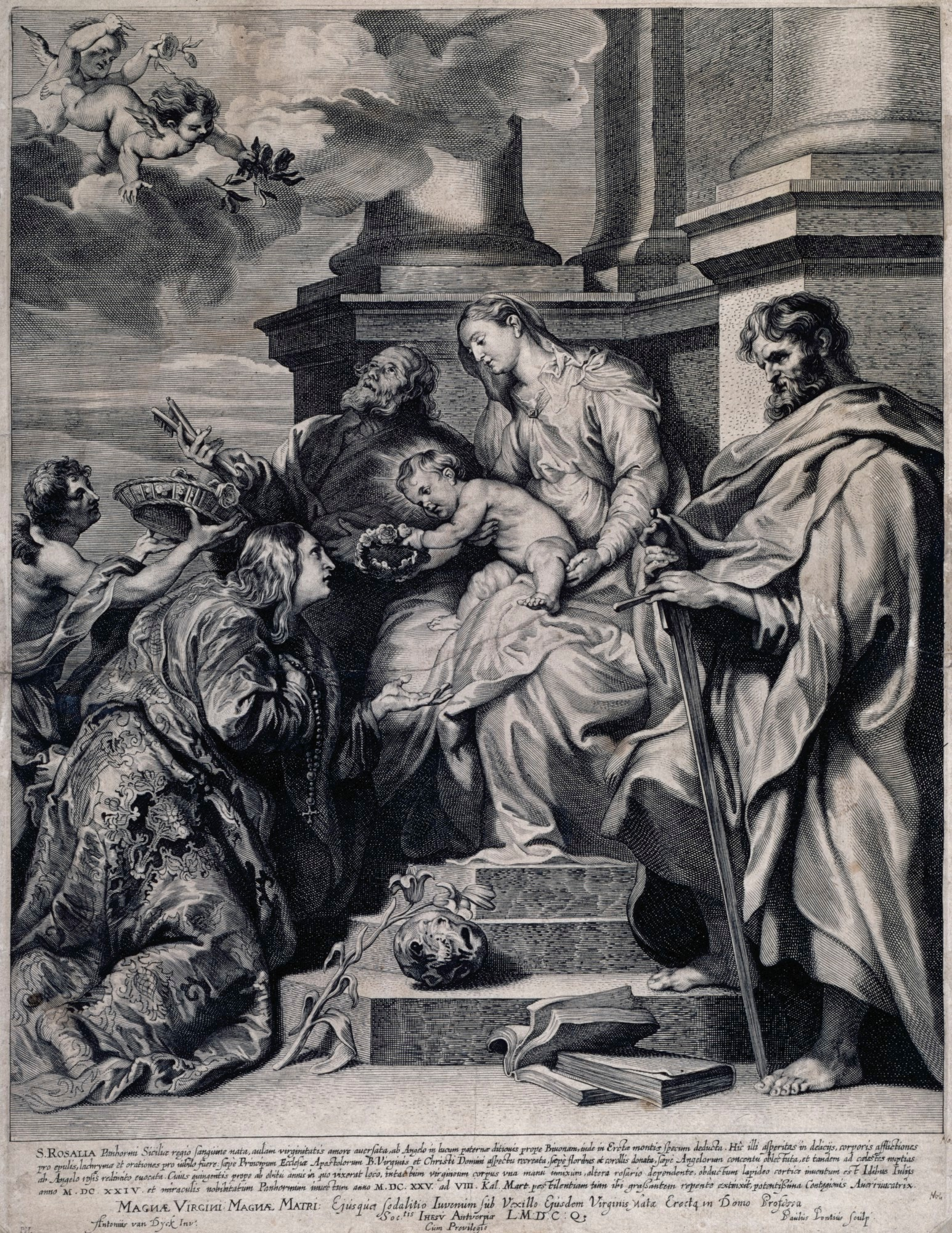
Paulus Pontius after van Dyck, Coronation of Saint Rosalia, 1629-1658

It was the last painting the artist produced of Saint Rosalia and - with Saint Rosalia Interceding for the City of Palermo (also 1629) - represented a return to a subject of which he had painted five earlier versions whilst trapped in the saint's home city of Palermo during a plague in late 1624 and early 1625. The chapel in which it was to hang housed relics of the saint sent to Antwerp by the Jesuits during an earlier plague there in 1626 in the hope of spreading her cult beyond Sicily via major trading cities in the Spanish Netherlands. The saint was particularly invoked against the plague. They also tried to spread her cult from their church in Ypres, for which they commissioned Gaspar de Crayer's Coronation of Saint Rosalia (Museum of Fine Arts, Ghent) in 1644, a work heavily influences by Paulus Pontius's print of van Dyck's version of the subject.

The Jesuits had been particularly active in promoting Saint Rosalia's cult in Sicily and beyond. The Jesuit Giordano Cascini had produced in 1627 the saint's first hagiography entitled Vitae Sanctae Rosaliae, Virginis Panormitanae e tabulis, situ ac vetustate obsitis e saxis ex antris e rudieribus caeca olim oblivione consepultis et nuper in lucem. One reason why van Dyck was given the commission was that he was himself a member of the Antwerp Fraternity of senior bachelors. He worked for a relatively low fee considering his fame at the time. Another reason why he was chosen was that he various earlier works of the saint. That van Dyck may have met Cascini and the other Palermo Jesuits in 1624–1625 is regarded as another possible reason for the commission.

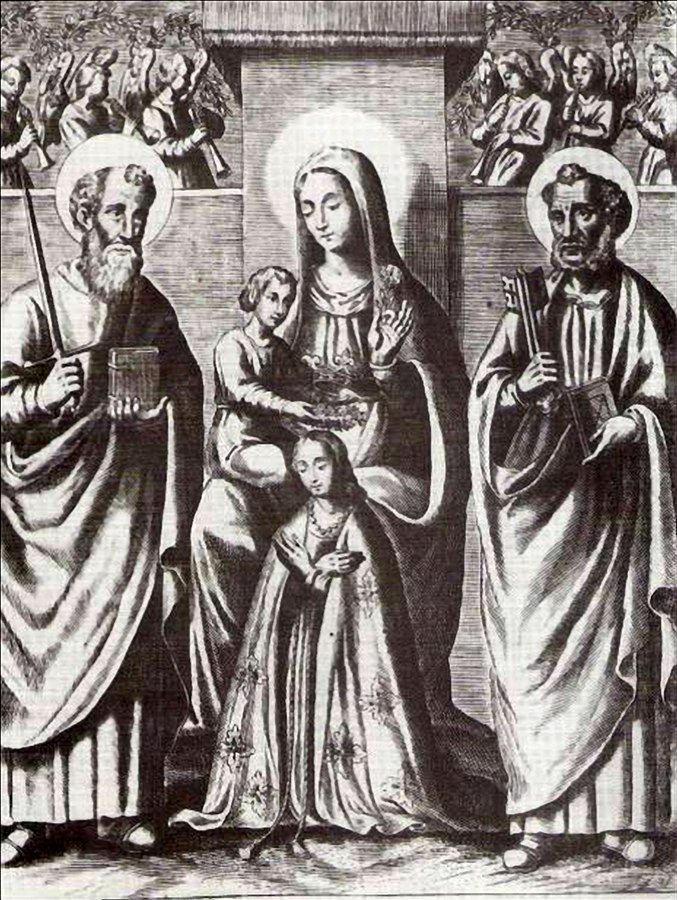
The coronation of Saint Rosalia with Saints Peter and Paul, print from the 1627 Vitae Sanctae Rosaliae by Giordano Cascini

Van Dyck had started making drawings of the saint for the engravings that were included in the Vita S.Rosaliae Virginis Panormitanae Pestis patronae iconibus expressa, published by Cornelis Galle the Elder in Antwerp in 1629. The engravings in the publication, of which only one copy survives, were the work of Antwerp engraver Philips van Mallery. These drawings by van Dyck, the resulting engravings and the painting itself all show a strong influence from the prints illustrating Cascini's 1627 hagiography of the saint.

== Analysis ==
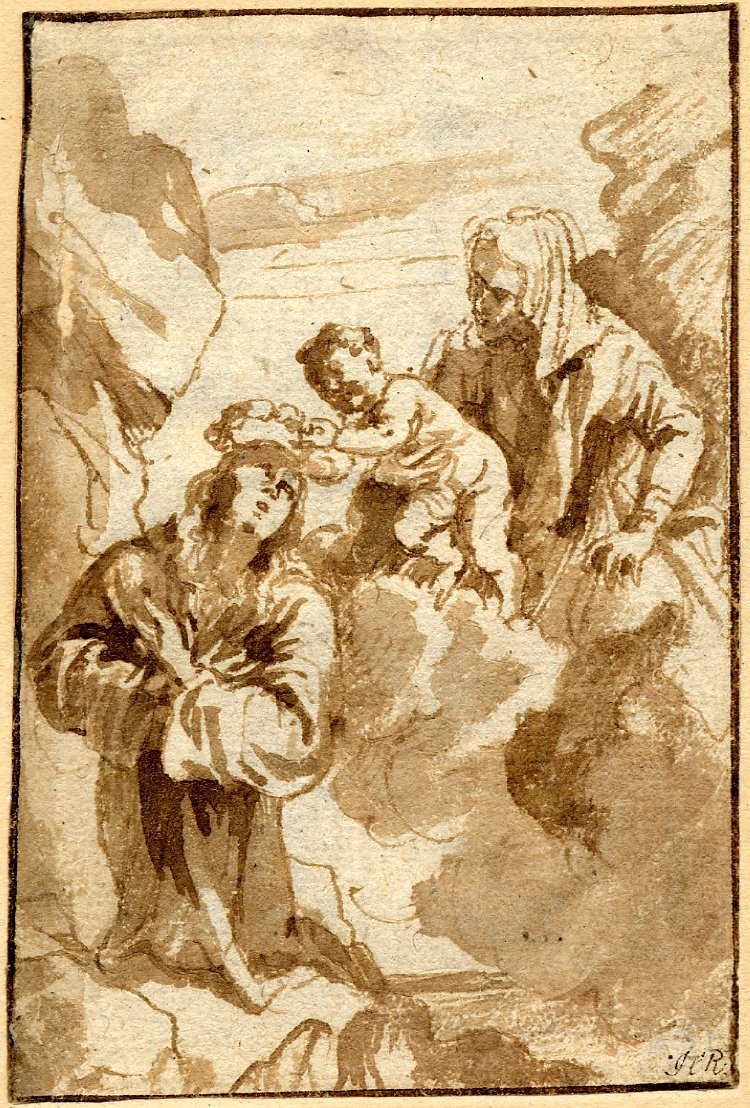
Saint Rosalia, 1629 drawing by van Dyck in the British Museum.

In both the Coronation and his 1624-1625 paintings of the saint, van Dyck drew heavily on prints after works by Sicilian artists, though mainly for themes and details rather than style or composition. The Coronation depicts the Virgin and Child flanked by saint Paul and saint Peter, with their usual attributes of a sword and keys. The Christ Child crowns Saint Rosalia, who is on her kneels, similarly as in the engraving in Cascini's Vitae Sanctae Rosaliae. That engraving is derived from a lost 1494 painting by Tommaso De Vigilia once in Santa Rosalia church in Bivona in western Sicily.

Rosalia's rich brocaded mantle is unprecedented in earlier Flemish art showing the saint, which had usually shown her alone in a poor Franciscan-type habit. This detail is probably also drawn from a print but may also show the influence of the earlier c. 1506 oil on panel painting by Riccardo Quartararo, showing Rosalia in royal clothing adoring the enthroned Virgin and Child.

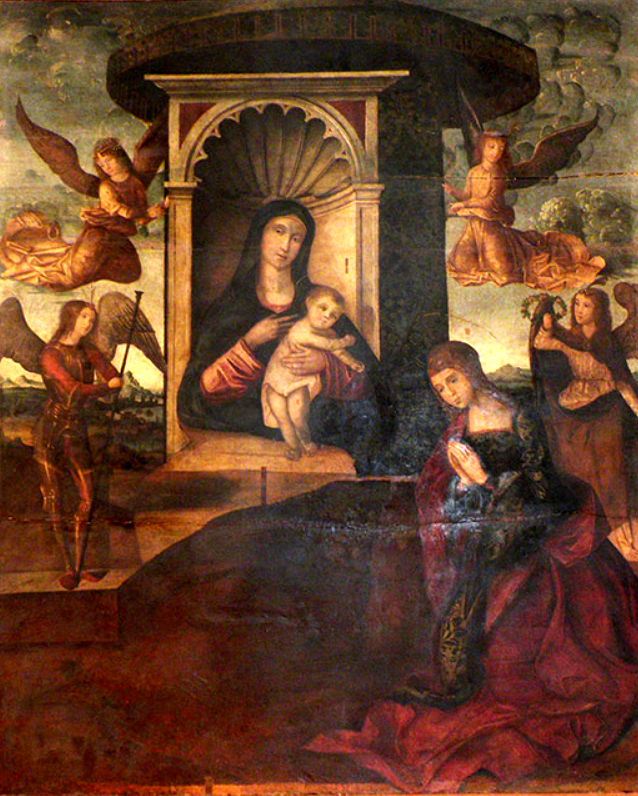
Saint Rosalia Adoring the Madonna and Child by Riccardo Quartararo, c. 1506

Sicilian works are not believed to have influenced the composition or style of the Coronation, which instead show the Venetian influence van Dyck had picked up during his time in Italy, a decisive influence on the formation of his style. The brightly-lit colours and the diagonal formed by the Madonna, Child and Saint Rosalia are very similar to Paolo Veronese's 1575 Mystic Marriage of Saint Catherine, clearly van Dyck's main model for Coronation. The skull, lily and roses are all typical attributes of Saint Rosalia, with the last two not only shown woven into the crown but also carried in the basket of the figure at the extreme right of the painting (probably quoting Titian's c. 1550 Prado Salome) and held by the cherubs in the top right-hand corner.

== See also ==
- List of paintings by Anthony van Dyck
