= St. Rosalia's Church (Ljubljana) =

Former Baroque church in Ljubljana (Slovenia)

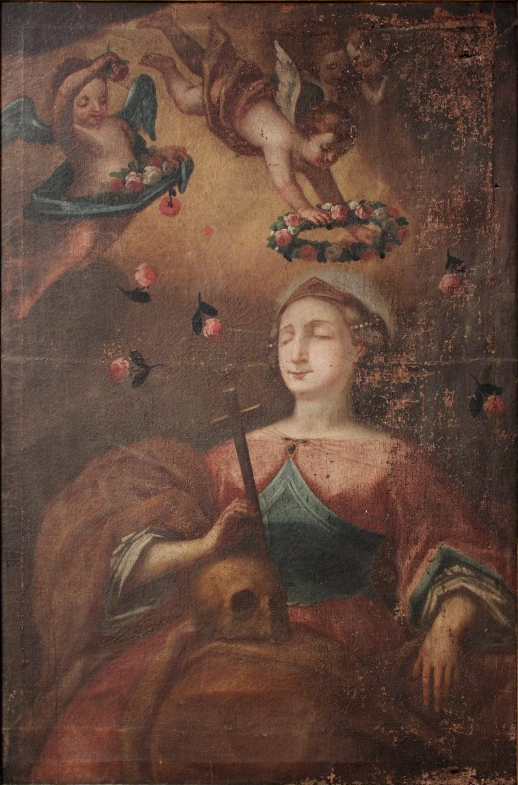
Saint Rosalia, the image that has presumably been preserved from St. Rosalia's Church

St. Rosalia's Church (Slovene: cerkev sv. Rozalije) was a Baroque church that stood on Castle Hill in Ljubljana in the 18th century. Its construction began in 1708, but it was only completed in 1723. The church was heavily damaged in a fire in 1774 and pulled down in 1786. It was octagonal and was the first church in Ljubljana with a dome. It may have been built upon plans by the architect Carlo Martinuzzi. Until late spring 2011, some remains of its walls were visible in a playground on Castle Hill, and presumably also an altar painting of Saint Rosalia, now kept by the Ursuline Convent in Ljubljana, has been preserved from St. Rosalia's Church.
