= Saint Rosalia =

Patron saint of Palermo, Italy

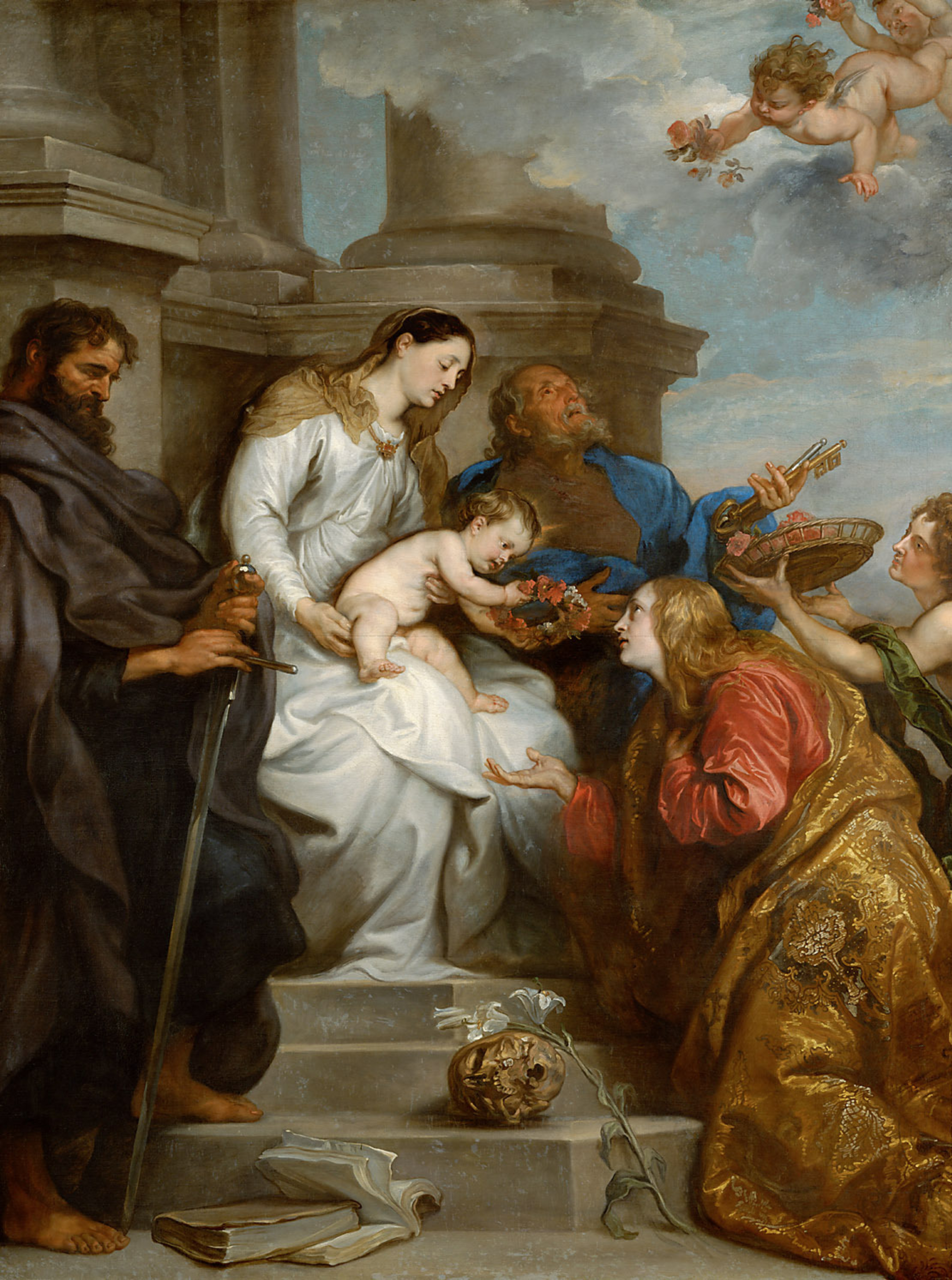
- The Coronation of Saint Rosalia by van Dyck

Virgin
- Born: 1130; Palermo, Kingdom of Sicily
- Died: 1166 (aged 35–36); Mount Pellegrino, Kingdom of Sicily
- Venerated in: Catholic Church
- Feast: 4 September
- Attributes: cross, book, skull, spray of lilies, chisel and hammer, crown of roses, attended by winged angels, cave opening of Palermo Harbour
- Patronage: Palermo; El Hatillo, Miranda; Zuata, Anzoátegui; El Playón, Portuguesa; Santa Rosalía de Camargo, Chihuahua; El Alto de Escuque, Trujillo; Italian fishermen of Monterey, California

Rosalia (Italian: [rozaˈliːa]; Sicilian: Rusulìa; 1130–1166), nicknamed la Santuzza ("the Little Saint") was a virgin and hermit on Monte Pellegrino. She is venerated as the patron saint of Palermo in Italy, Camargo in Chihuahua, and three towns in Venezuela: El Hatillo, Zuata, and El Playón. She is especially invoked in times of plague. During the COVID-19 pandemic, she was invoked by some citizens of Palermo to protect the city.

== Life ==
Rosalia was born of a Norman noble family that claimed descent from Charlemagne. Devoutly religious, she retired to live as a hermit in a cave on Mount Pellegrino, where she died alone in 1166. Tradition says that she was led to the cave by two angels. On the cave wall, she wrote "I, Rosalia, daughter of Sinibald, Lord of [Monte] delle Rose, and Quisquina, have taken the resolution to live in this cave for the love of my Lord, Jesus Christ."

== 1624 plague ==
In 1624, a plague beset Palermo. During this hardship Rosalia reportedly appeared first to a sick woman, then to a hunter, to whom she indicated where her remains were to be found. She ordered him to bring her bones to Palermo and have them carried in procession through the city.

The hunter climbed the mountain and found her bones in the cave as described. He did what she had asked in the apparition. After her remains were carried around the city three times, the plague ceased. After this Rosalia was venerated as the patroness saint of Palermo, and a sanctuary was built in the cave where her remains were discovered.

Her post-1624 iconography is dominated by the work of the Flemish painter Anthony van Dyck, who was trapped in the city during the 1624–1625 quarantine, during which time he produced five paintings of Rosalia, now in Madrid, Houston, London, New York and Palermo itself. In 1629 he also produced Saint Rosalia Interceding for the City of Palermo and Coronation of Saint Rosalia to assist Jesuit efforts to spread devotion to her beyond Sicily.

== Context and religious devotion ==
=== Norman Sicily and Religious Diversity ===
Saint Rosalia lived in the twelfth century, during the Norman Kingdom of Sicily. This kingdom came to be after the Normans conquered the region in the eleventh century. Sicily became a strong and well-organized kingdom under King Roger II and his successors. One unique thing about Sicily was its diversity. According to The Society of Norman Italy, Sicily was made up of a mixed religious population that included Christians, Greek Christians, Muslims, and Jews. This diversity shaped the people on the island and made Sicily different from the majority of the other European city-states at the time.

==== Rosalia and Norman Sicilian Society ====
Rosalia’s story is a strong example of how older traditions from the medieval period continued to shape people’s beliefs in later centuries. The discovery of her remains connects back to the Norman period. Looking at what Saint Rosalia meant to her people, she represents several important values of Norman Sicilian society. Her life of devotion and isolation reflects the importance of religion, and her connection to Palermo shows how local identity mattered. In a diverse society with many different cultures, saints helped create a sense of unity. Saint Rosalia gave the Sicilian people a sense of protection and hope.

===== Palermo and Medieval Religious Culture =====
Palermo’s location is also very important for understanding Rosalia as a saint. Palermo was and still is the capital of the kingdom and one of the most important cities in the Mediterranean due to its central location. Because of this, Sicily had connections to most of Europe, North Africa, and the Byzantine Empire. This meant that different cultures, languages, and religions were constantly interacting. This connected and diverse environment made it necessary for people to share beliefs and practices, and religion became one of the main ways to do that. Religion played a central role in shaping the cultural context of Saint Rosalia. In medieval Sicily, people strongly believed in the power of saints to help in everyday life. Saints were seen as protectors who could perform miracles, such as healing the sick, and save cities from suffering. The fact that most people believed this shows that devotion to saints was not a small part of their culture; it was a key belief in their society.

====== Cult and Legacy ======
Rosalia’s cult filled a devotional and political need in Sicily, reinforcing community and trust in divine protection. Today, there are still celebrations of Saint Rosalia in multiple countries. These celebrations continue to praise her, illustrating the hope that she brought during tough times. Historians often debate whether this cult represented the revival of an older tradition or a response to crisis. In either case, Rosalia’s veneration filled a social and political need, reinforcing identity and resilience. Now, her cult remains central to Sicilian society and memory, illustrating how medieval traditions can be reshaped to address early modern challenges.

====== Noblewomen and Female Hermits ======
One of the most significant and unique aspects of Saint Rosalia’s life was that she was both a noblewoman and a female hermit. In twelfth-century Sicily, noble women were usually expected to help their families through marriage, manage their homes, raise children, and live through their aristocratic status. Her decision reflected a broader movement in medieval Europe in which noble women abandoned wealth and social status to devote themselves to God. By leaving society and living alone in a cave on Mount Pellegrino, Rosalia demonstrated the ideals of sacrifice, humility, and separation from worldly life that were highly valued in medieval spirituality.

====== Women, Sanctity, and Medieval Devotion ======
Rosalia’s identity as a female hermit also helps historians understand changing attitudes towards women and sanctity during this time period. Women often had limited political authority and power, so religious devotion was one of the only ways noblewomen could have influence and recognition. Female saints such as Rosalia became important examples of holiness because their sacrifices of humility, chastity, obedience to God, and isolation were ideals admired by medieval society. Rosalia’s significance extends beyond her later association with miracles and plague protection. Her life also reflected twelfth-century spirituality and the increasing visibility of women in medieval devotional culture. Historians have used Rosalia’s life to examine how gender, religion, and nobility influenced expressions of religious devotion in Norman Sicily.

== Veneration ==
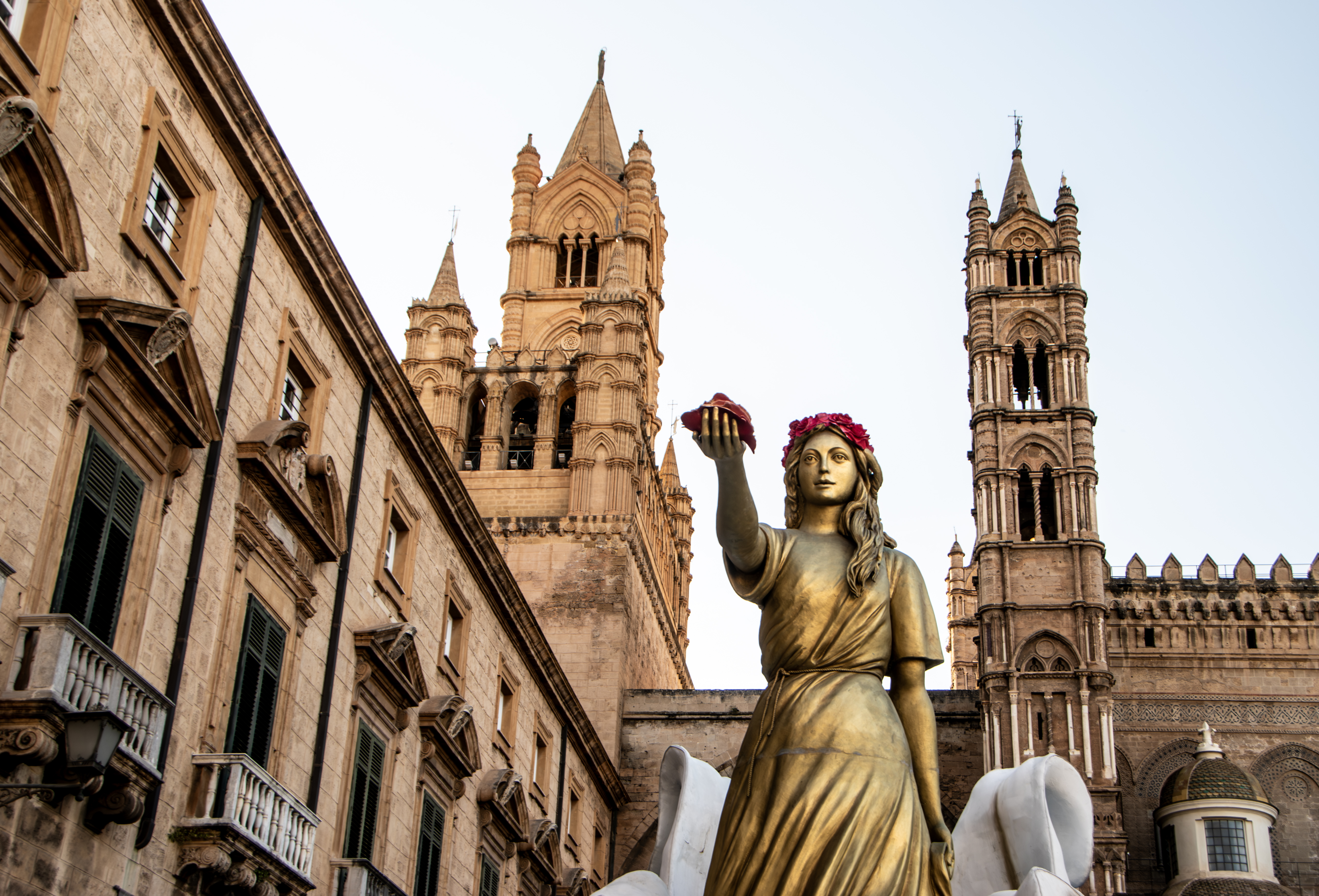
Float of Saint Rosalia beside the Archbishops' Palace and Cathedral of Palermo, Italy

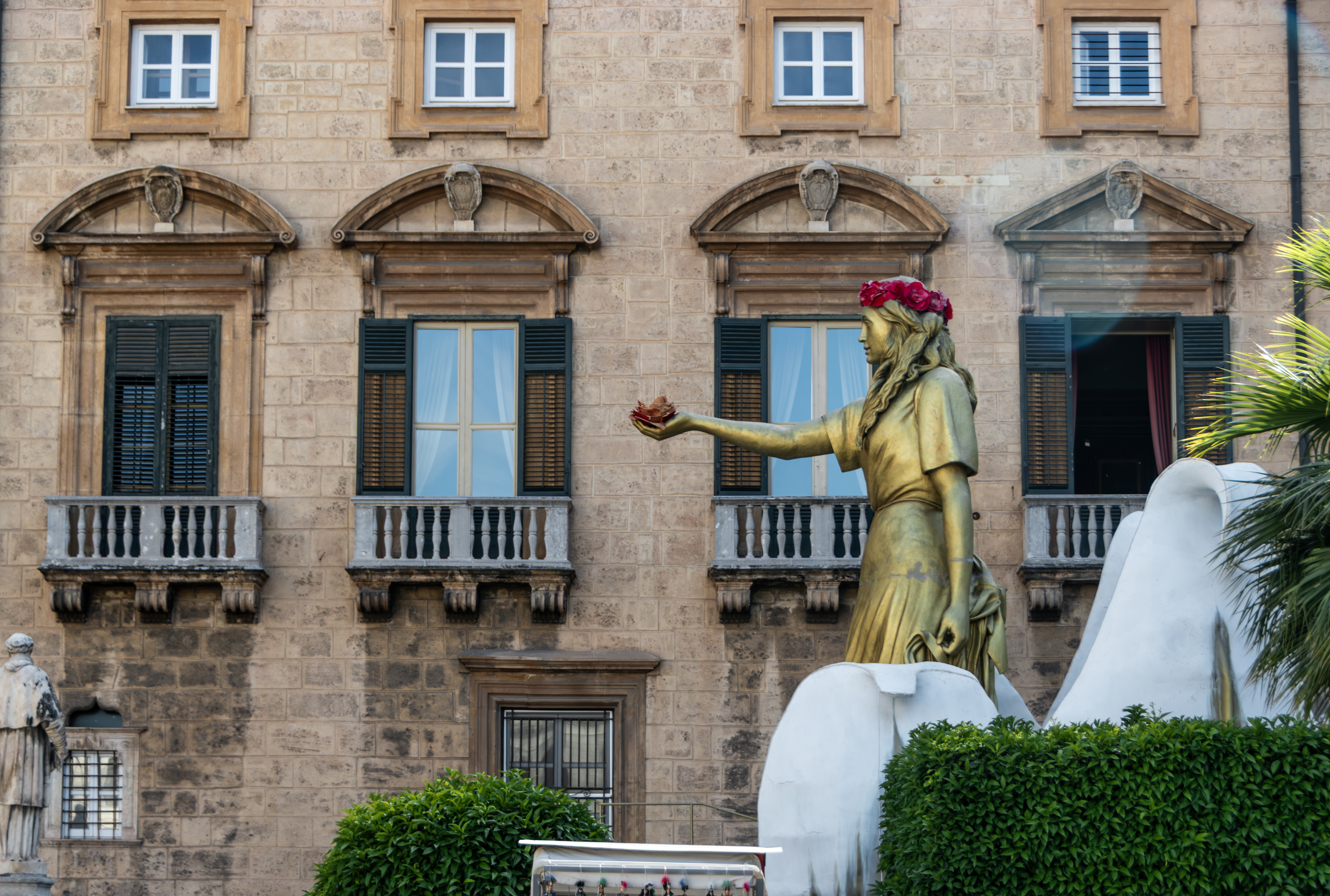
Float of Saint Rosalia in Palermo, Italy

In Palermo, the Feast of Saint Rosalia is held each year on 14 July, and continues into the next day. It is a major social and religious event in the city.

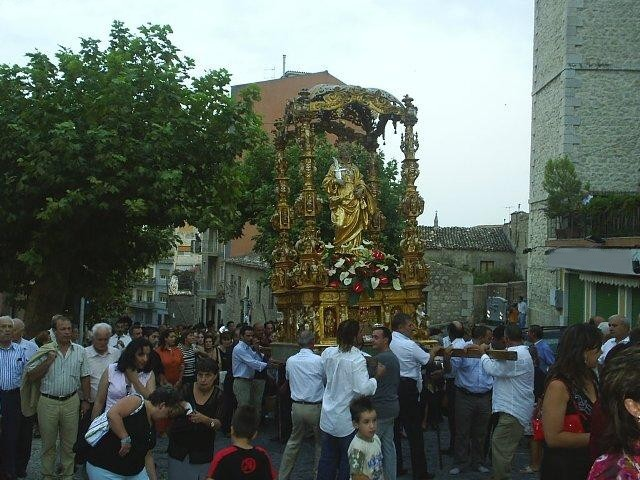
A statue of St. Rosalia carried through the streets of Bivona, Sicily

The feast of St. Rosalia is on 4 September.

The devotion to Santa Rosalia is widespread among the large and mainly Hindu Tamil community of Sri Lankan origin settled in Palermo.

On 4 September, a tradition of walking barefoot from Palermo up to the Sanctuary of Santa Rosalia high up on Mount Pellegrino is observed in honor of Rosalia. In Italian-American communities in the United States, the July feast is generally dedicated to Our Lady of Mount Carmel while the September feast, beginning in August, brings large numbers of visitors annually to the Bensonhurst section of Brooklyn in New York City.

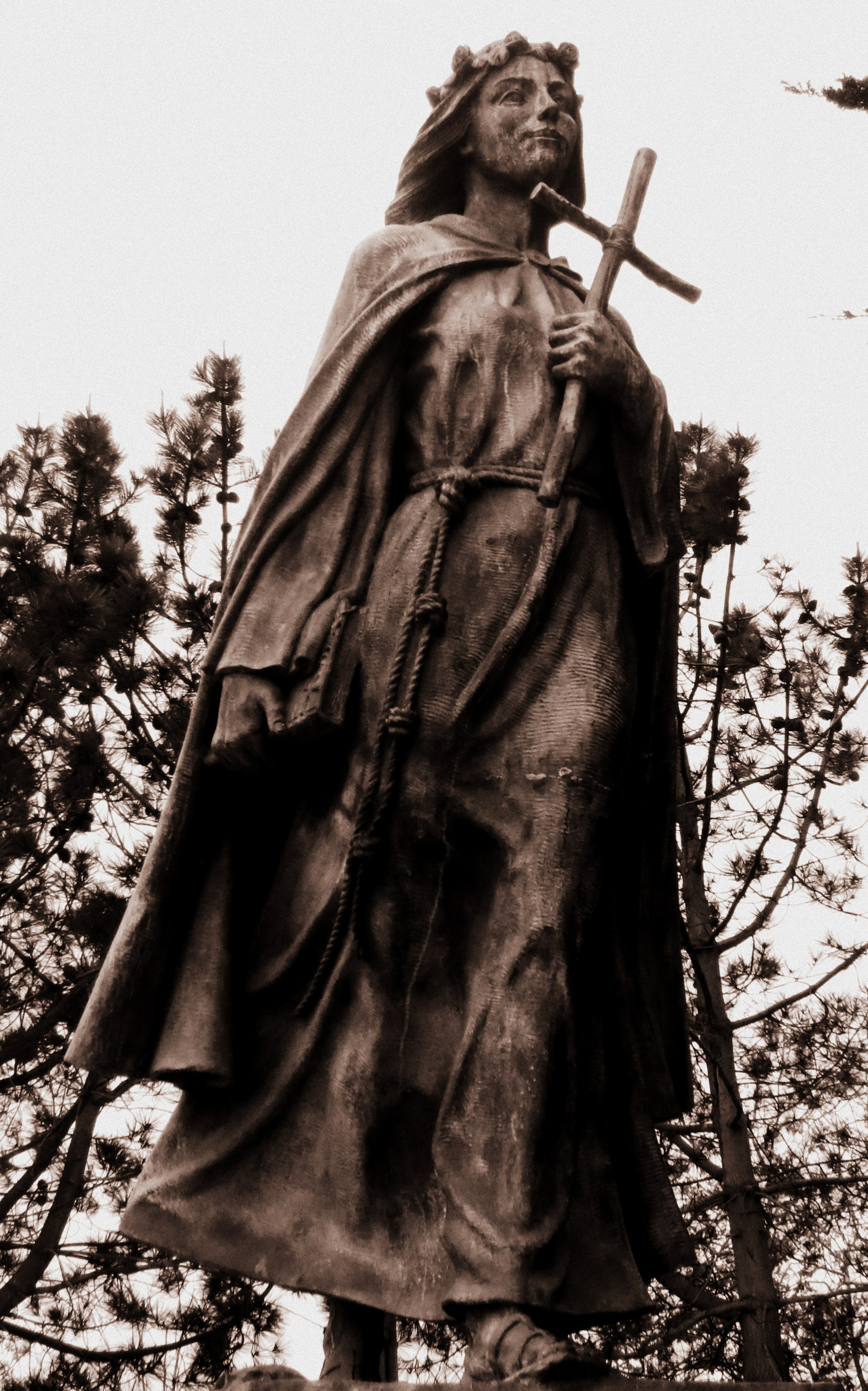
Saint Rosalia statue, Monterey, California

Santa Rosalia is venerated as the patroness of the Italian sardine fishing fleet in Monterey, California.

Also, although St. Rosalia lived in a period after the Great Schism, some Orthodox faithful today recognise and venerate her as a saint.

== In biology ==
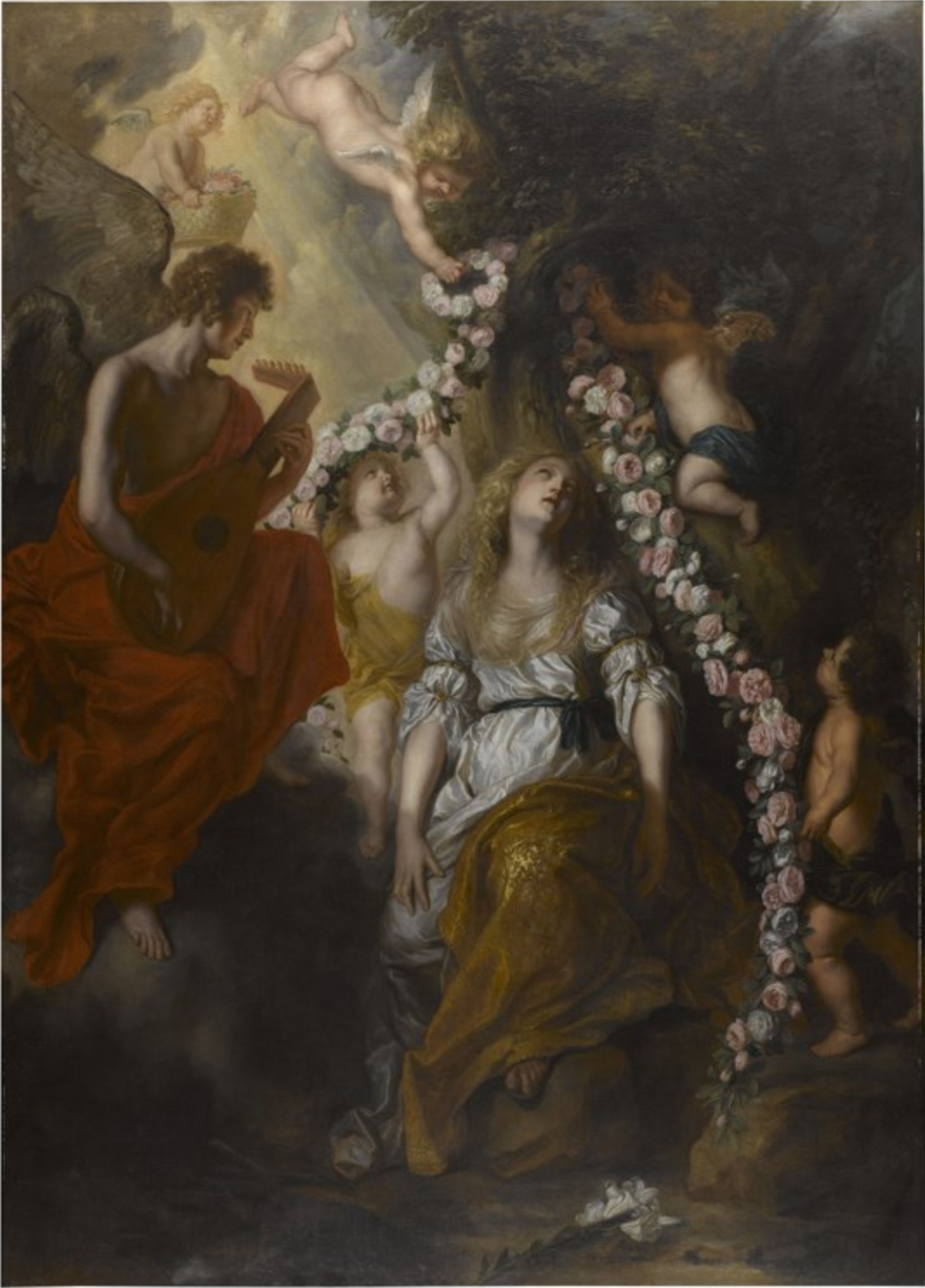
The ecstasy of Saint Rosalia of Palermo by Theodoor Boeyermans

Rosalia was proposed as the patron saint of evolutionary studies in a paper by G.E. Hutchinson. This was due to a visit he paid to a pool of water downstream from the cave where St. Rosalia's remains were found, where he developed ideas based on observations of water boatmen.

== In art ==
Saint Rosalia was an important subject in Italian Renaissance and Baroque painting, particularly in sacre conversazioni (group pictures of saints flanking the Virgin Mary) by artists such as Riccardo Quartararo, Mario di Laurito, Vincenzo La Barbara, and possibly Antonello da Messina.

It was the Flemish master Anthony van Dyck (1599–1637), who was caught up in Palermo during the 1624 plague, who produced the most paintings of her. His depictions – a young woman with flowing blonde hair, wearing a Franciscan cowl and reaching down toward the city of Palermo in its peril – became the standard iconography of Rosalia from that time onward. Van Dyck's series of St. Rosalia paintings have been studied by Gauvin Alexander Bailey and Xavier F. Salomon, both of whom curated or co-curated exhibitions devoted to the theme of Italian art and the plague. In March 2020, The New York Times published an article about the Metropolitan Museum of Art's painting of Saint Rosalia by Van Dyck in the context of COVID-19.

Van Dyck also made designs for prints which were engraved by Philips van Mallery for the publication Vita S. Rosaliae Virginis Panormitanae Pestis Patronæ iconibus expressa, which was published by Cornelis Galle the Elder in Antwerp in 1629. Only a few copies of the work, which recounts the life of Saint Rosalia, survive.

== See also ==
- Coronation of Saint Rosalia
- List of Catholic saints
