= Hadewych of Meer =

Premonstratensian abbess (c. 1150–1200)

Blessed Hadewych O.Praem.
- Born: c. 1150; Germany
- Died: 14 April, c. 1200
- Venerated in: Roman Catholic Church

Hadewych, O.Praem., (c. 1150 – 14 April, c. 1200) a.k.a. Hadewig or Hedwig, was abbess of the Premonstratensian monastery of Meer, (now part of Meerbusch) in modern North Rhine-Westphalia, Germany.

== Life ==
Hadewych was the daughter of Count Lothair of Meer and Hildegund. Her brother was Hermann Joseph. After her father's death, she accompanied her mother on a pilgrimage to Rome. Upon their return, about 1178, they both took religious vows as nuns and converted the family castle into a monastery. Hadewych became part of the community founded by her mother. She succeeded her mother as abbess in 1183.

Hadewych died on April 14, about the year 1200; devotion to her quickly spread among the Norbertine community. She, as well as her mother and her brother, are venerated as "Blessed" by the Catholic church.
