= Hildegund (widow) =

Blessed Hildegund O.Praem.
- Born: ~1130; Germany
- Died: 1183
- Venerated in: Roman Catholic Church
- Feast: 6 February

Hildegund (c. 1130–1183) was a Praemonstratensian abbess. Born to nobility, her father was Count Herman of Lidtberg and her mother Countess Hedwig. She was married to Count Lothair of Meer (now Meerbusch), in the modern region of North Rhine-Westphalia, Germany. Together they had three children, one of whom did not survive into adulthood.

At the age of twelve, her son Hermann Joseph was sent to the Premonstratensians (Norbertine) at Steinfeld Abbey, who sent him to the Netherlands to study. Upon his return, he became a canon regular of the order and served as provost in the Diocese of Münster. There he developed widespread fame as a mystic. In 1958 Pope Pius XII formally recognized his cultus, and Hermann Joseph von Steinfeld is regarded as a saint.

With the death of her husband, Hildegund made a pilgrimage to Rome, accompanied by her daughter, Hedwig. Upon their return to Germany in 1178, despite the opposition of her family, she took vows as a nun of the Premonstratensian Order. She converted her castle into a monastery, serving as its first abbess

She should not be confused with another Hildegund of the same era, who lived her life disguised as a man, and was considered by some as a saint.
