= Hermann Joseph von Steinfeld =

German canon regular and mystic

Saint Hermann Joseph O.Praem.
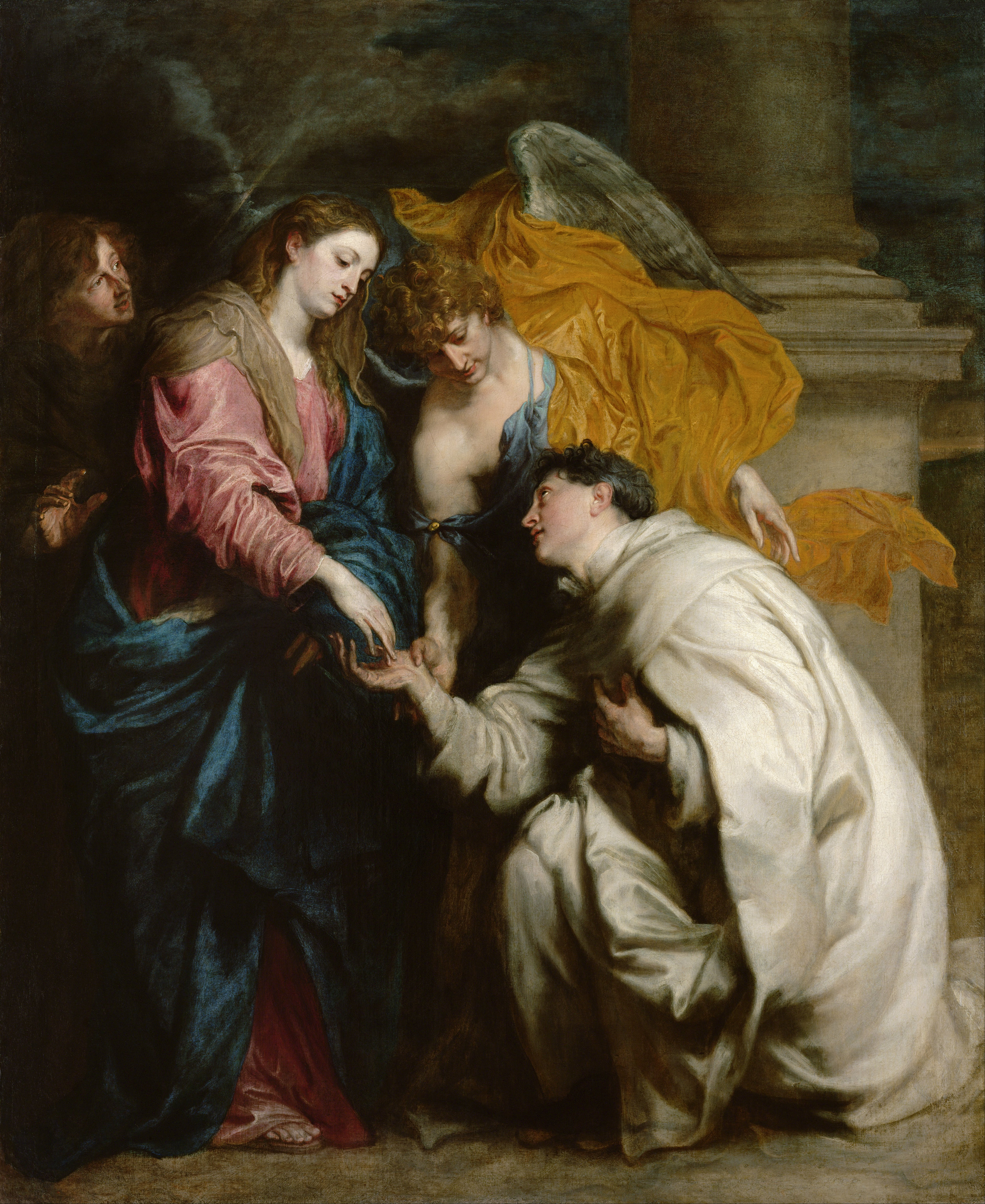
- The Vision of the Blessed Hermann Joseph by Anthony van Dyck
- Born: c. 1150
- Died: 7 April 1241
- Venerated in: Roman Catholic Church
- Canonized: 11 August 1958, Vatican City by Pope Pius XII
- Feast: 7 April
- Attributes: kneeling before a statue of the Virgin and Child and offering an apple
- Patronage: Children; Students; Watchmakers

Hermann Joseph, (c. 1150 – 7 April 1241) was a German Premonstratensian canon regular and mystic. Never formally canonized, in 1958 his status as a saint of the Roman Catholic Church was formally recognized by Pope Pius XII.

== Life ==
Hermann was born in Cologne, the son of Count Lothair of Meer and his wife Hildegund. His sister was Hadewych of Meer. Though of the nobility, the family was not overly wealthy. According to the biography by Razo Bonvisinus, a contemporary and prior of Steinfeld Abbey, at the age of seven Hermann attended school and very early was known for devotion to the Blessed Virgin. At every available moment, he could be found at the church of St. Maria im Kapitol, where he would kneel rapt in prayer to Mary. Bonvisinus claims that the boy once presented an apple, saved from his lunch to a statue of Jesus, who accepted it. According to still another legend, on another occasion, when on a cold day he made his appearance with bare feet, Mary procured him the means of getting shoes.

At the age of twelve, he entered the abbey of the Premonstratensian (more commonly known as Norbertine) Canons Regular at Steinfeld. As he was too young to be accepted into the Order, he was sent to study, probably at Mariengaarde at Hallum in Friesland. Upon his return, he made his vows and was given the habit and the additional name "Joseph". As a novice, he was entrusted initially with the service of the refectory and later of the sacristy.

After his ordination, Hermann was sometimes sent out to perform pastoral duties and was also in frequent demand for the making and repairing of clocks. He was also active in pastoral care outside the monastery, especially in women's monasteries in the Eifel region. Herman was characterized by his child-like devotion to Mary. Late in his life, he had under his charge the spiritual welfare of the Cistercian nuns at Hoven, near Zülpich, whom he served as chaplain. There he died and was buried in their cloister.

== Works ==
His "Commentary on the Canticle of Canticles" is lost. His Opuscula, still extant, include:

- Duodecim gratiarum actiones
- Jubilus seu Hymnus de SS. undecim millibus Virginibus
- Oratio ad Dominum nostrum Jesum Christum, taken to a great extent from the Canticle of Canticles
- Alia Oratio
- Precula de quinque Gaudiis B. Mariae V.

It is not quite certain whether the last three are the works of Hermann, though they are generally ascribed to him.

He possibly created the oldest hymn to the Sacred Heart of Jesus ("Summi regis cor aveto").

== Veneration ==
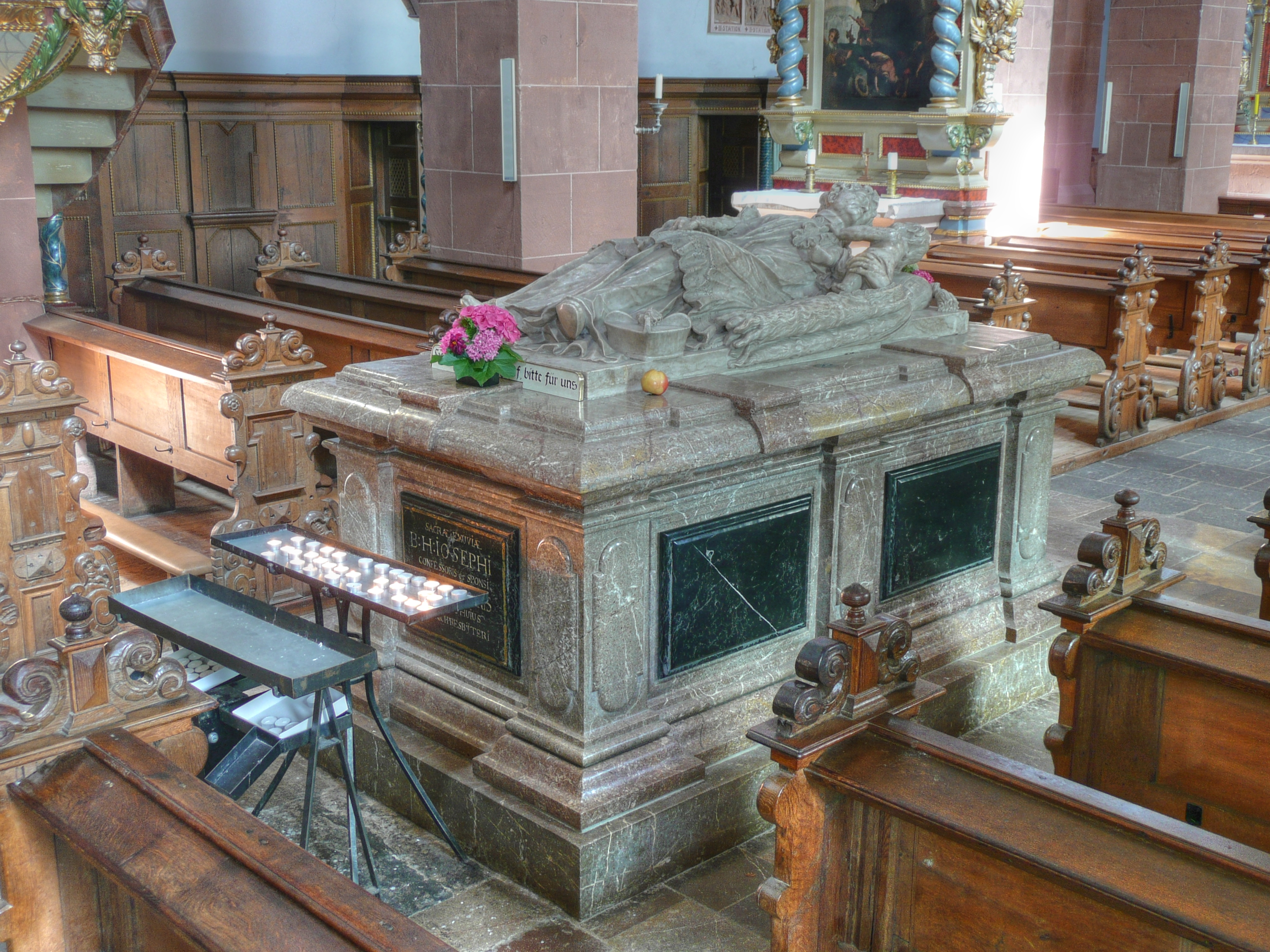
Tomb of Hermann Joseph von Steinfeld, Kloster Steinfeld

Reports of miracles that are said to have happened immediately after his death testify to the veneration of the saint in the late Middle Ages. The miracle stories show well-known hagiographic patterns. Miraculous healings deal with the blind or almost blind, paralyzed and possessed, but also with everyday complaints such as toothache, sore throat, headache, etc.

His body was later transferred back to Steinfeld, where his marble tomb and large picture may be seen to the present day. By custom, apples are left at his tomb, in reference to a legend that Hermann once offered an apple to the Christ Child in the arms of the Madonna in the church of St. Maria im Kapitol at Cologne - who took it. Portions of his relics are at Cologne and at Antwerp. His grave in Steinfeld became a pilgrimage destination. In the Middle Ages especially by mothers, in modern times by children and pupils. The Hermann Josef Festival is held at Steinfeld on the sixth Sunday after Easter.

The process of his canonization was begun in 1626, at the request of Archbishop Ferdinand of Cologne and the Emperor Ferdinand II, but was interrupted. His feast, however, continued to be celebrated on 4 April, by the members of his Order and the name of Hermann was listed in the Premonstratensian supplement to the Roman Martyrology. They also celebrate the translation of his relics on 24 May. Pope Benedict XIII consecrated an altar in honour of the Blessed Hermann Joseph in the Roman College of the Norbertines in 1728.

His status as a saint was confirmed by Pope Pius XII in 1958. (The Salvatorian Fathers, who had come to occupy the abbey in Steinfeld in modern times, opted to perform this less costly and involved process—known as Confirmatio Cultus—rather than to carry out a full canonization process.) His current feast day on the calendar of the diocese of Cologne is 21 May. (His mother and sister are listed among the "Blessed".)

=== Iconography ===
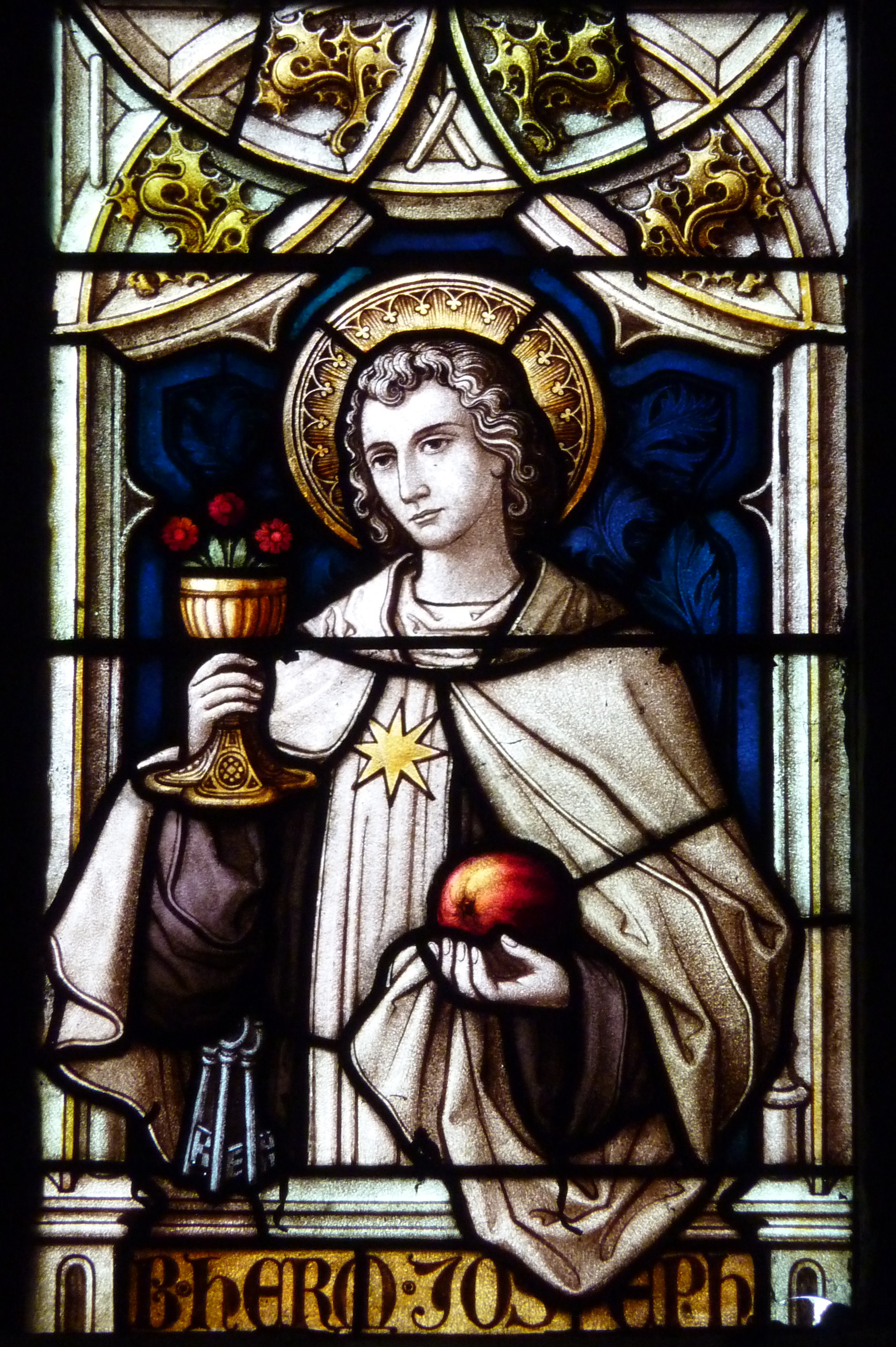
Stained glass image of Hermann Joseph, with apple and chalice filled with roses. (Wachtberg)

Hermann Josef is depicted as a religious with Mary and the baby Jesus, often offering an apple; his attributes are a chalice or three roses.

=== Patronage ===
Hermann Joseph is the patron of watchmakers, and of children and young people. As a former sexton, he was held up as a model for sextons, acolytes, and altar servers.

Hermann Josef received calls from expectant women who asked for a good delivery. The patronage of expectant mothers ("patronus puerperarum") has been handed down since the 17th century in the use of "touch relics", such as needles, brooches and clasps left on the reliquary and retrieved to fastened to their hairstyle or clothes in the hope of a happy pregnancy through the intercession of the saint.
