= The Vision of the Blessed Hermann Joseph =

Painting by Anthony van Dyck

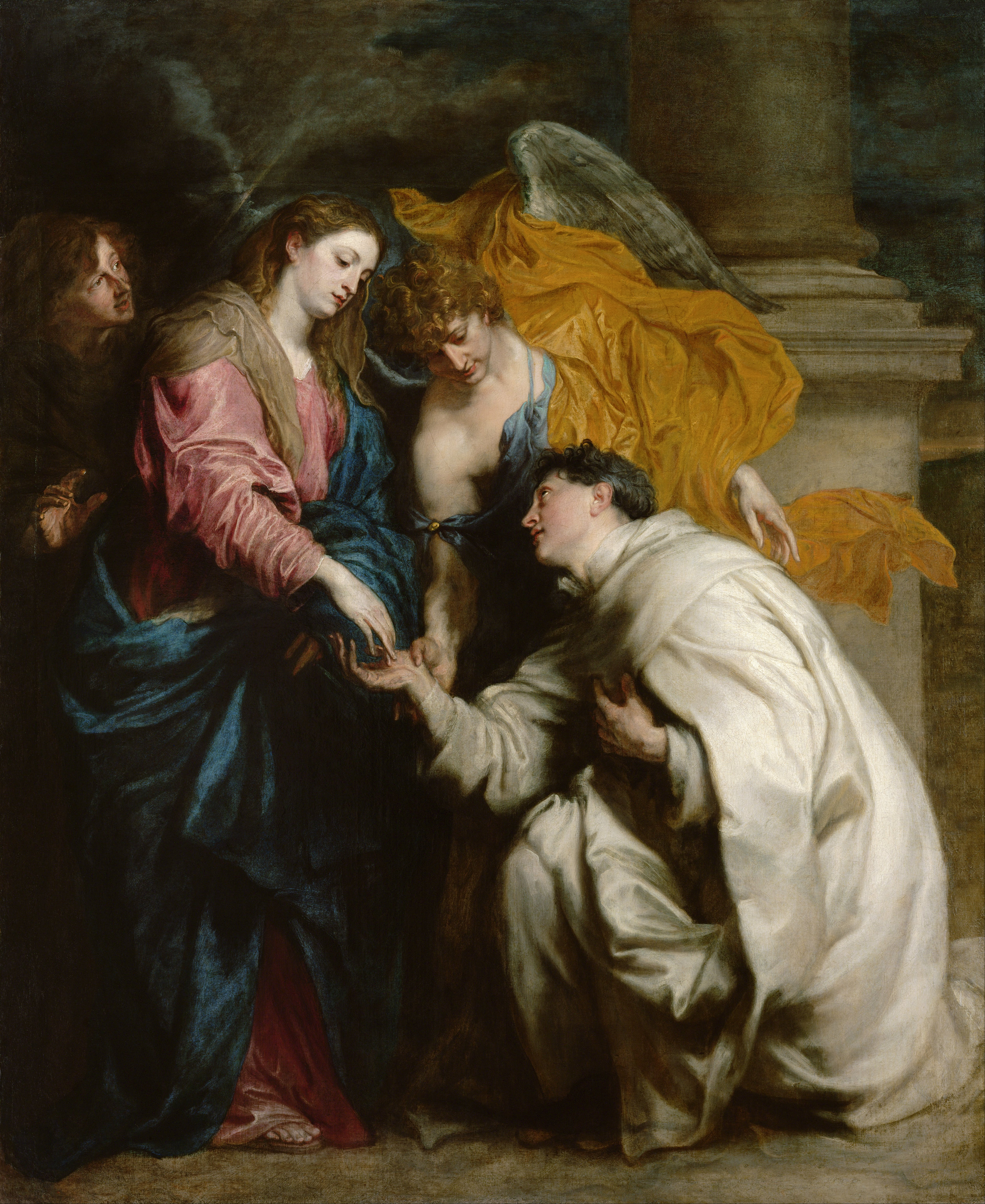
The Vision of the Blessed Hermann Joseph (1629-1630) by Anthony van Dyck

The Vision of the Blessed Hermann Joseph, or The Mystical Engagement of the Blessed Hermann Joseph to the Virgin Mary, is a 1629-1630 painting by the Flemish Baroque painter Anthony van Dyck.

== Background ==
The painting depicts Hermann Joseph (c. 1150–1241), a Premonstratensian canon and priest from the Cologne region. He had a devotion to the Virgin Mary and according to legend had several visions of her during his lifetime – the painting shows one of these, in which he was joined in a mystic marriage to her and received the name 'Joseph' after her spouse Saint Joseph Produced for a chapel in Saint Ignatius Church in Antwerp (as had Coronation of Saint Rosalia the previous year), it is now in the Kunsthistorisches Museum in Vienna.

== History ==
The painting was one of several commissioned from van Dyck by the Jesuit sodality in Antwerp, of which he had become a member in 1628. It seems to have been influenced by The Vision of Saint Francis Xavier by the Antwerp painter Gerard Seghers and by Rubens's Saint Teresa of Ávila's Vision of the Holy Spirit – van Dyck had been working as Rubens' studio assistant and pupil since returning to Antwerp in 1627 after eight years in Italy, including work on a series of paintings for Saint Carolus Borromeus church.

== See also ==
- List of paintings by Anthony van Dyck
