= Joseph of Schönau =

German monk

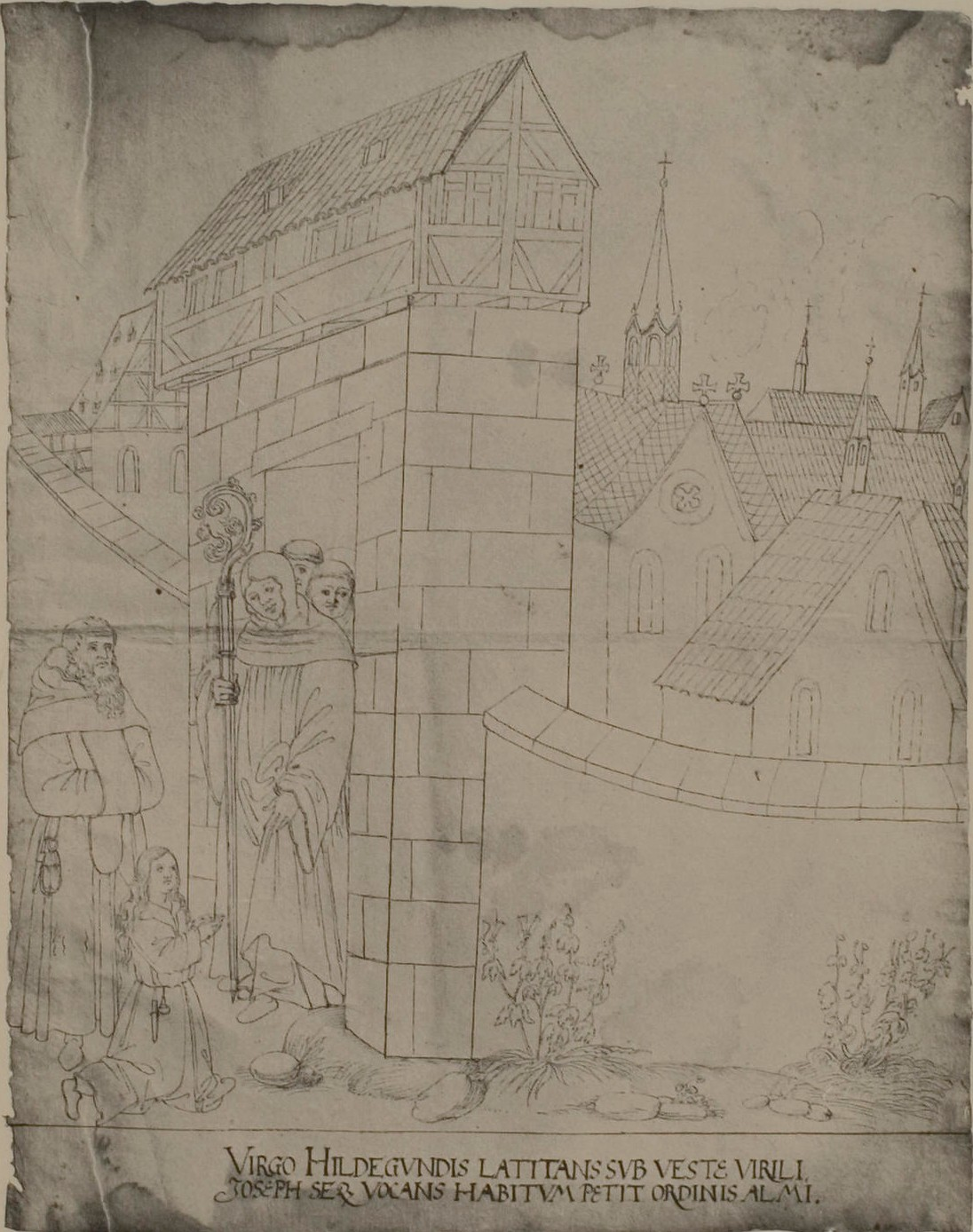

Joseph of Schönau (died 1188) was a German monk who lived as a man despite their body being characterised as female after his death. The individual's name prior to adopting a male identity may have been "Hildegund". Joseph is often described as a saint (feast day April 20), though the cult has never been formally approved.

The stories of Joseph's adventures and entry into the monastery were supposedly told by Joseph himself on his deathbed. According to the tale, when Joseph was 12 years old, shortly after the death of his mother, his father, a knight of Neuss in Germany, took the child on a pilgrimage to the Holy Land. The father died on the way back, and young Joseph was robbed and abandoned in Tyre by the man charged with his protection, and was forced to beg.

Joseph managed to return to Germany, where he became servant to an old canon of Cologne. Eventually, Joseph was sent to deliver a message to the Pope, who resided in Verona at the time. During the journey, Joseph was accused of being a robber and condemned to death. He was saved by undergoing the ordeal of red hot iron, yet was nonetheless hanged by the real robbers' companions. He was cut down in time and survived. After having returned to Germany, he joined Schönau Abbey as a Cistercian novice. Three years later, he died.

On his deathbed, Joseph had described his adventures (though not his background or birth name) to the monk charged with his instruction. Only after Joseph's death was his full body seen, after which the monks began to refer to him with feminine terms, such as by using female Latin endings. An abbot of a nearby monastery wrote an account of Joseph's life in 1188, the year of his death.

Joseph was also called Hildegund in some sources, under the assumption that Hildegund was the name given to them at birth; therefore, he should not be confused with Saint Hildegund (c. 1130–1178), whose feast day is 6 February.
