= Mount Pellegrino =

Mountain in Palermo, Italy

Coordinates: 38°10′N 13°21′E

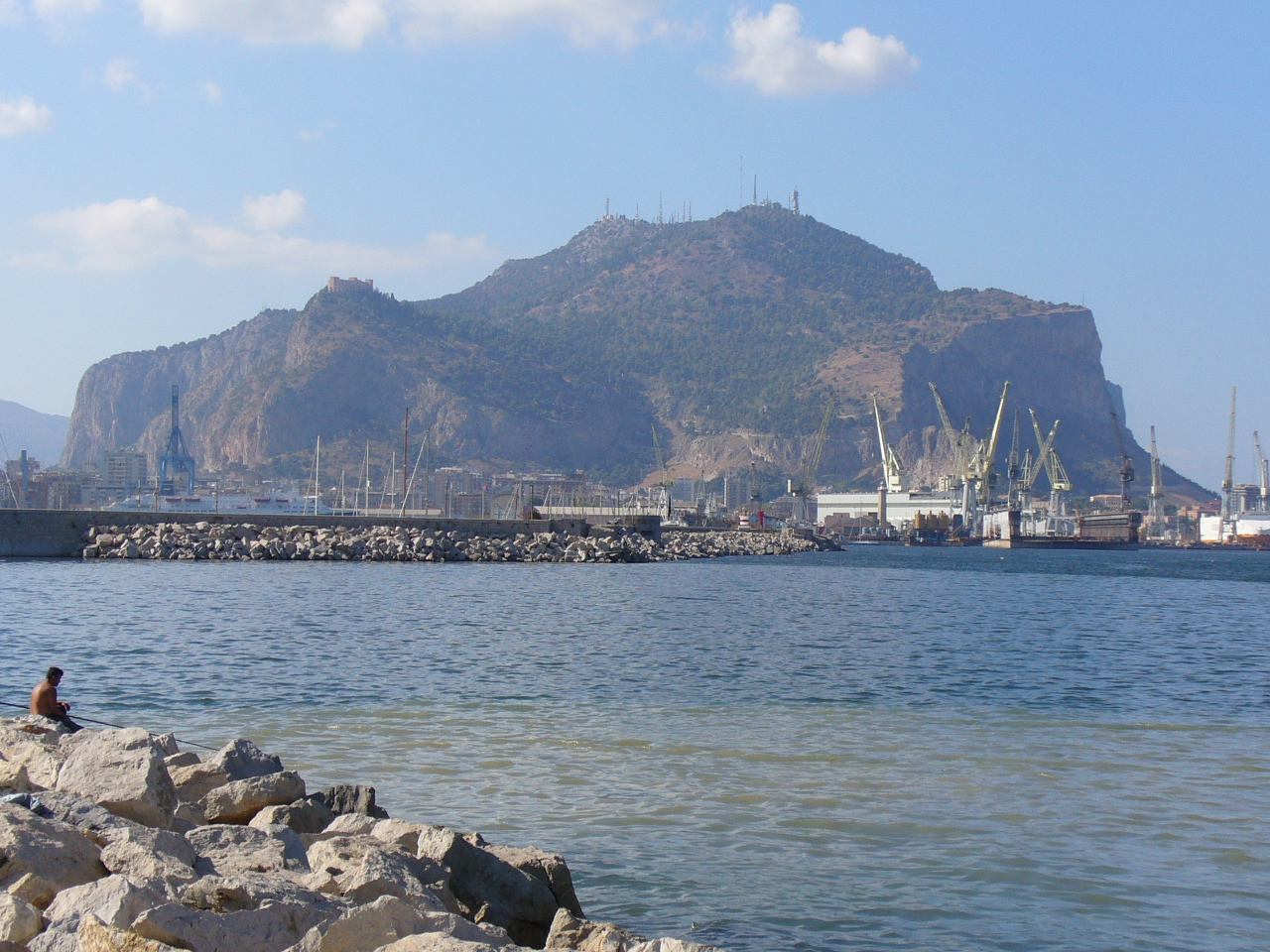
Mount Pellegrino with Palermo Harbor at its feet, seen from the southern coast of the city.

Mount Pellegrino (Italian: Monte Pellegrino; Sicilian: Munti Piddirinu) is an isolated carbonate rock promontory on the northern coast of Palermo, Sicily, Southern Italy. It has an altitude of 606 meters (1,988 ft) above sea level, making it the highest peak within the city perimeter; however, due to its low height it is generally compared to a hill. It extends towards the Tyrrhenian Sea, closes the Gulf of Palermo to the north, and marks the eastern border of the bay of Mondello. Being visible from all the areas on which the city stands, the promontory is one of its most represented symbols. In 1992, Mount Pellegrino been identified as a Special Area of Conservation by the European Commission due to the fossil finds, the presence of a notable endemism, and the historical finds, which include the Paleolithic graffiti of the Addaura cave, one of the few finds of rock art in the Mediterranean area. From 1996, it is the heart of the natural reserve of the same name, which extends for 1,050 hectares (2594,607 acres).

Mount Pellegrino is a very important area regarding both religious and cultural traditions of Palermo. The Phoenician settlers who founded the city between the 8th and the 7th century BC considered it a sacred place and established a sanctuary there for the goddess of fertility Tanit. In medieval times it became a destination for christian hermit monks. Furthermore, it is home to the Sanctuary of Saint Rosalia, venerating the patron saint of Palermo who died in a cave on the top of the promontory in the 12th century.

In the 18th century, the German writer Johann Wolfgang von Goethe described Mount Pellegrino as the most beautiful promontory in the world in his book Italian Journey. Goethe was particularly impressed by the Palermo cult of Saint Rosalia, and once he visited the top of the mountain, where the cave-sanctuary stands, he was struck by its beauty and noted that perhaps all of Christianity "has no other sanctuary that is decorated and venerated in a more naive and moving way".
