= El Playón, Santander =

El Playón
- Municipality and town
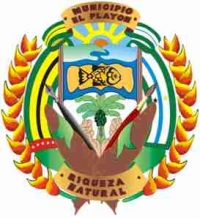
- Flag Coat of arms

- Location of the municipality and town of El Playón in the Santander Department of Colombia.

- Location in Colombia
- Coordinates: 7.47667°N 73.2081°W
- Country: Colombia
- Department: Santander Department

Area
  - Total: 459 km^{2} (177 sq mi)
- Elevation: 469 m (1,539 ft)

Population (Census 2018)
  - Total: 12,966
  - Density: 28.2/km^{2} (73.2/sq mi)
- Time zone: UTC-5 (Colombia Standard Time)

El Playón is a town and municipality in the Santander Department in northeastern Colombia.
