= Santuario di Santa Rosalia, Palermo =

Church building in Palermo, Italy

Sanctuary of Saint Rosalia
- Santuario di Santa Rosalia
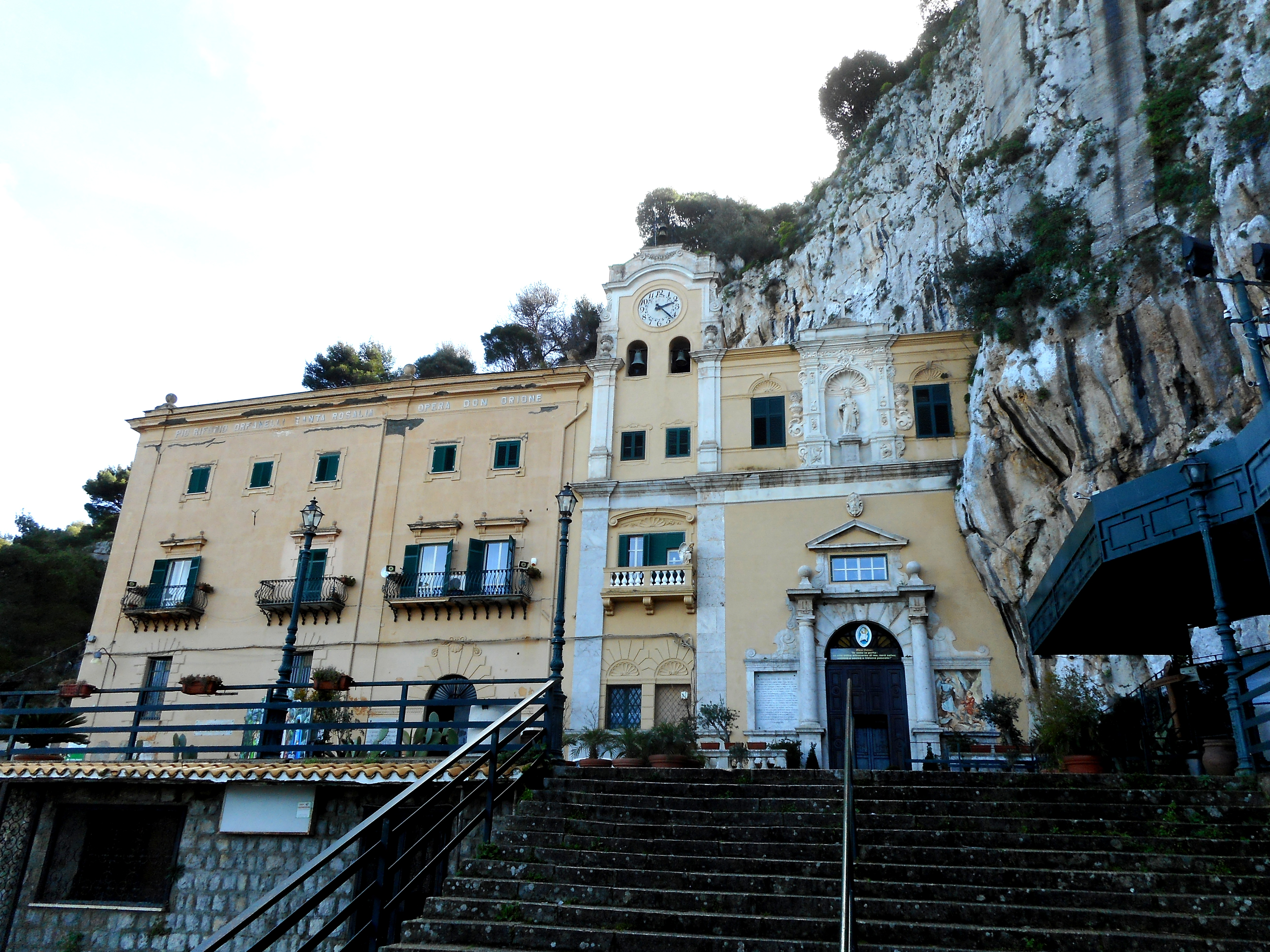
- External view of Sanctuary

Religion
- Affiliation: Roman Catholic
- Province: Archdiocese of Palermo
- Rite: Roman Rite

Location
- Location: Monte Pellegrino, Palermo, Italy
- Interactive map of Sanctuary of Saint Rosalia
- Coordinates: 38.16823°N 13.35134°E

Architecture
- Groundbreaking: 1625

The Sanctuary of Santa Rosalia is a church and pilgrimage site located on via Bonnaojust outside of the urban neighborhoods of Palermo, nestled against a stone cliff wall on Mount Pellegrino, which looms to the north of the Sicily city. On 15 July 1624, putative relics of this 12th century saint were discovered in a cave at the site, and since the plague ebbed after these bones were paraded through town, Saint Rosalia was adopted as the fourth female patron saint of Palermo, and this sanctuary was erected in her honor.

== History ==
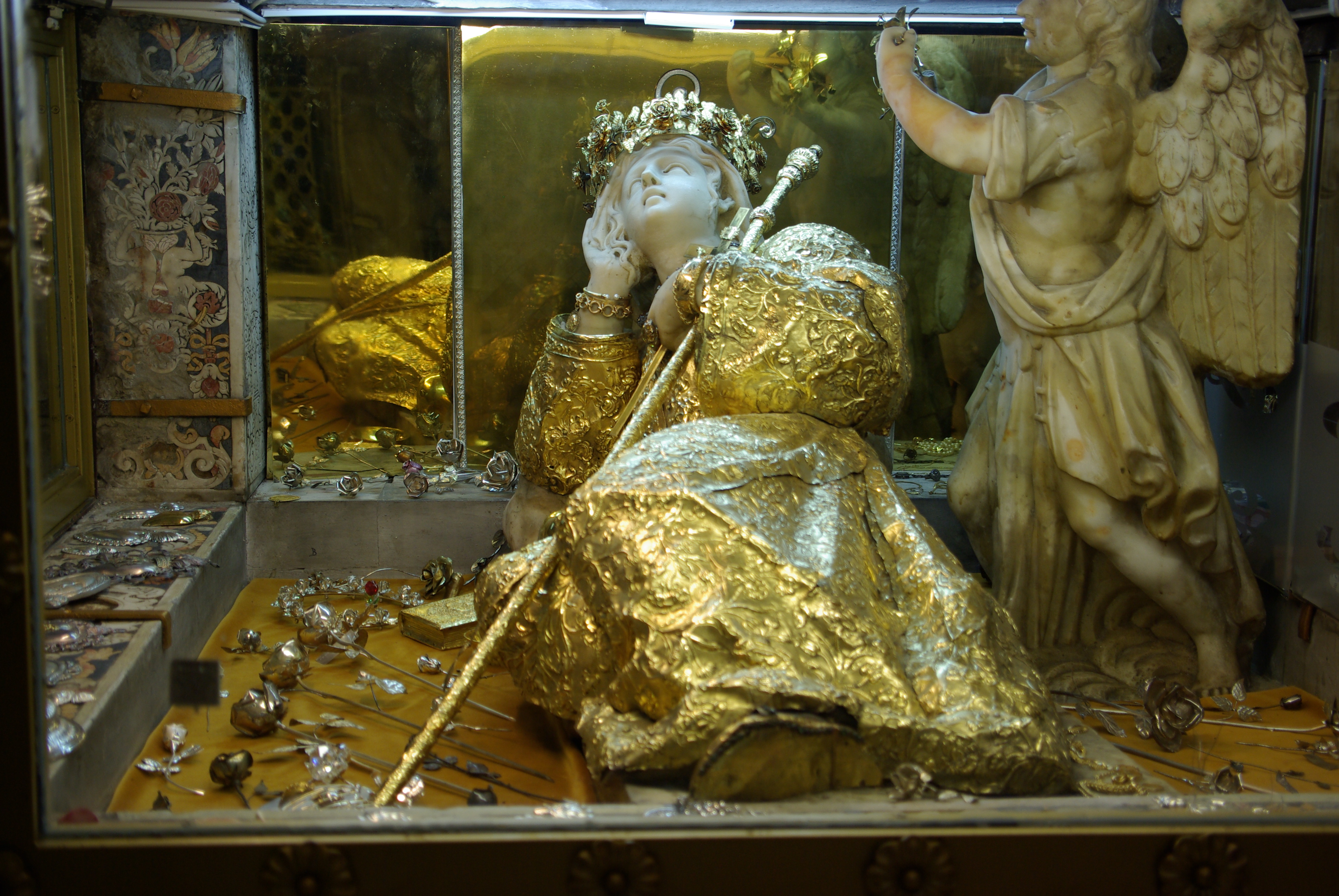
Gilded statue of Santa Rosalia

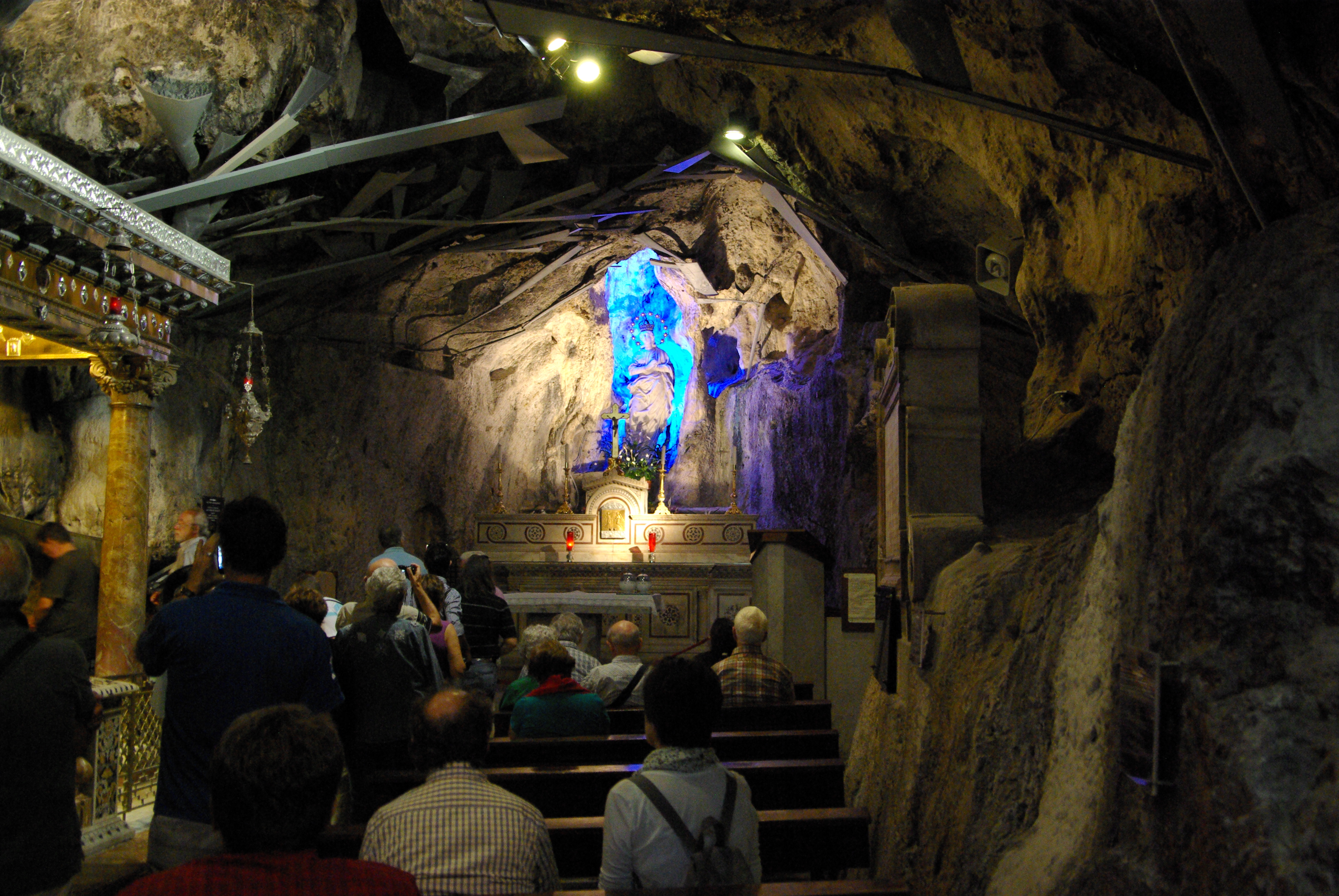
Grotto of Sanctuary

In 1624 the construction sanctuary at this site was patronized by the senate of Palermo and the cardinal archbishop Giannetino Doria. Since the 12th-century and linked to Rosalia, there appears to have been prior chapels or churches at this mountain which appears to have been a locus attracting religious hermits, much like Rosalia herself. By 1474, an eremitic community was located near the grotto; by 1574 it had become affiliated with the Franciscan order. In 1626, this monastery was suppressed.

Located high on the mountain, upon arrival to the locale, one ascends from a herd of souvenir stands to the sanctuary proper by an arduous staircase of over 70 steps. The yellow three story structure has a church facade on the right, merging with the cliff. The left structure has a frieze reading Pio Refugio Orfanelli Santa Rosalia/ Opera Don Orione, recalling the presence of a former orphanage for girls at the site. Since 1946, the custodians of the Sanctuary are Orionine brothers, members of a congregation called Sons of Divine Providence.

The sanctuary has been for centuries a site for pilgrimage for both the faithful and the tourists. Goethe visited the site in 1787, describing the sacred spot as one that better befits the humility of the saint than the sumptuous festivities that are celebrated to commemorate her retirement from the world. A British traveler of the 1880s describes the festival of Santa Rosalia as resembling a pagan saturnalia. The Baedeker guide from 1893 describes the zig-zag ascent up the mountain, for which donkeys could be hired to lead up to sanctuary through a hillside teeming with goats. It describes the Grotto of St Rosalia as a small decorated candle-lit cavern visited by numerous worshippers.

The church facade leads to an open air room where various plaques recall the veneration of the saint by various kings. The structure houses in a glass case, a gold-leaf and marble depiction of the recumbent hermit saint, attended by an cherub, with the marble sculpture (1625) by Gregorio Tedeschi, and the gold ornament provided in 1735 by King Charles III of Sicily. The grotto in the cliff has a standing statue of the saint. The building contains a display of donations to the sanctuary, many made of silver and gold.

To the northwest of the sanctuary is a ground labyrinth made with stones. Elsewhere on Mount Pellegrino, but no longer accessible, was found the Grotta dell'Addaura with Neolithic depictions of humans. Finally to the North of the sanctuary, in a belvedere overlooking the sea, is a graffiti-riddled statue of Santa Rosalia. The 1963 statue is peculiar because the Saint holds a spear like pole. However, the pole is a lightning rod, since the statues at this site place in 1663, 1750, and 1880 were all damaged by lightning.

A poetical illustration by Letitia Elizabeth Landon to an engraving of a painting of the grotto by Robert Brandard was published posthumously in Fisher's Drawing Room Scrap Book, 1840.
