= Riccardo Quartararo =

Italian painter (1443–1506)

- Born: 1443; Sciacca, Sicily
- Died: 1506 (aged 62–63); Palermo, Sicily
- Notable work: Archangel Michael, Saints Peter and Paul
- Movement: Renaissance

Riccardo Quartararo (Sciacca, Sicily, 1443 - Palermo, 1506) was an Italian painter of the Renaissance period, active in Sicily and Naples.

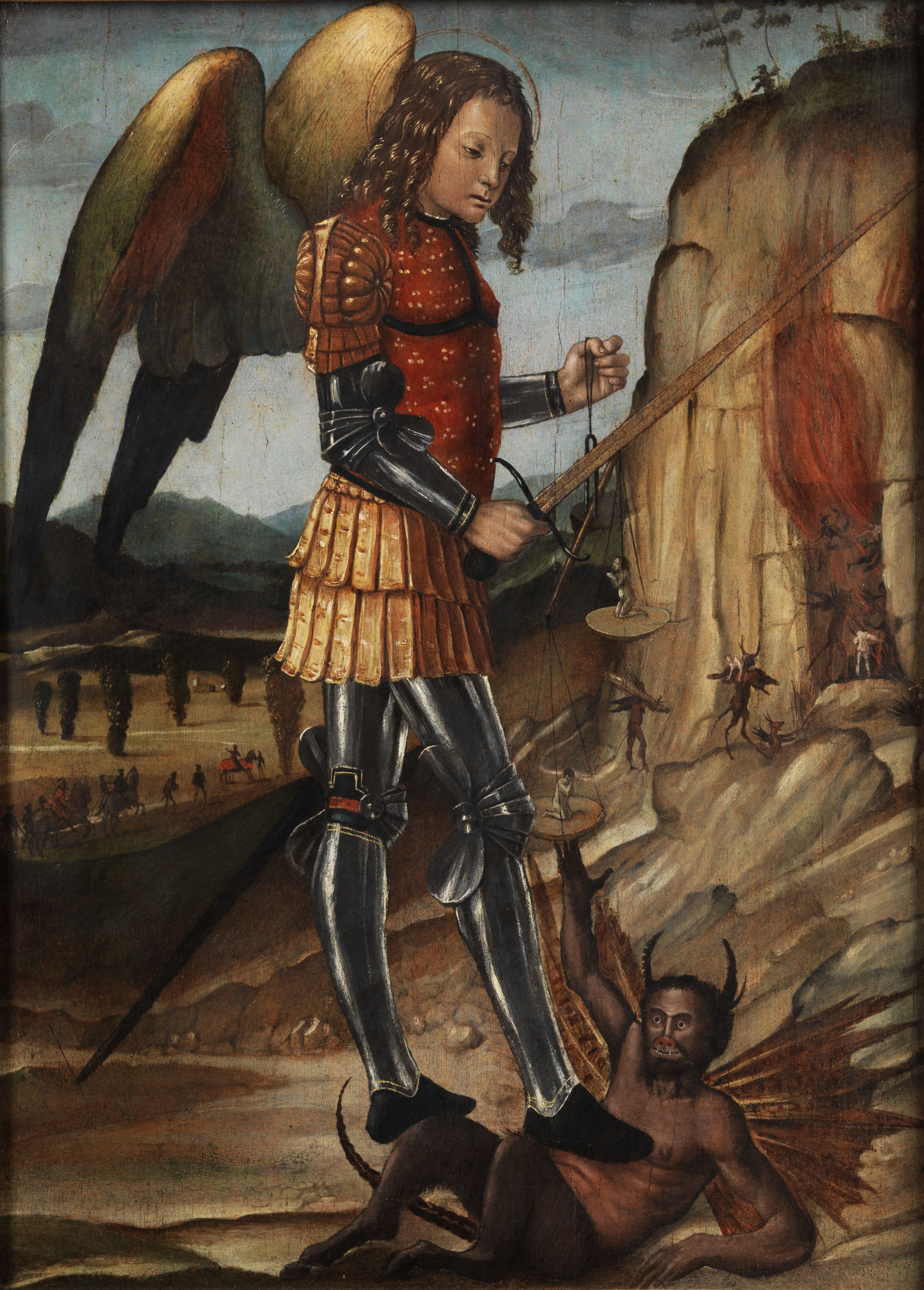
Archangel Michael

He painted the images of Saints Peter and Paul on wood, and they are now at Palermo Museum. The museum had once attributed them to followers of Antonello Crescenzio.

His first works in Palermo are a processional banner or Gonfalone (1485) for the Confraternity of Santa Elena in Corleone in 1485 During 1491–1501, he was active in Naples, working with Costanzo Moysis of Venice as a documented in the 1492 will by Quartararo and his wife Antonella Siscorsa. He also painted a Santa Cecilia for the Cathedral of Palermo.

Attributed to Quartararo are two painted wood tablets depicting two saints, one of Saint Margaret, at the Museo Nazionale of the ancient Salvatore Monastery of Palermo. The original condition was poor and they were heavily retouched in later centuries. Also attributed to Quartararo are two wood canvases in the private hands of a St. John the Baptist and St James Major.
