= El Playón, Venezuela =

Coordinates: 9.102775°N 69.041519°W

El Playón
- lndependencia
- Santa Rosalía within Portuguesa
- Country: Venezuela
- State: Portuguesa
- Municipality: Santa Rosalía Municipality
- Time zone: VST

El Playón is a tourist town in the state of Portuguesa, Venezuela. It is the shire town of Santa Rosalía Municipality. Its official name is Independencia, in honour of Francisco de Miranda's 1806 landing in a prelude to the Venezuelan War of Independence. (The landing was unsuccessful, leading to the loss of two ships.)
