= Deposition =

Deposition may refer to:

- Deposition (law), taking testimony outside of court
- Deposition (politics), the removal of a person of authority from political power
- Deposition (university), a widespread initiation ritual for new students practiced from the Middle Ages until the 18th century

== Art ==
- Deposition from the Cross, the depiction of the removal of Jesus from the cross
- Deposition (Bellini), a 1515–16 painting by Giovanni Bellini and his workshop
- Deposition of Christ (Bronzino), a 1545 oil painting
- The Deposition (Michelangelo), a 1547–55 marble sculpture
- The Deposition from the Cross (Pontormo), a 1528 oil painting
- Deposition from the Cross, Volterra (Rosso Fiorentino)
- The Deposition (Raphael), a 1507 oil painting
- The Deposition (Rubens), a 1602 painting by Peter Paul Rubens (previously attributed to van Dyck) now in the Galleria Borghese
- Deposition (Rogier van der Weyden) or The Descent from the Cross, an oil painting, c.1435
- Deposition (van Dyck, 1615), a 1615 painting by Anthony van Dyck, now in the Alte Pinakothek in Munich
- Deposition (van Dyck, 1618), a 1618–20 painting, now in the Kunsthistorisches Museum in Vienna
- Deposition (van Dyck, 1619), a c. 1619 painting, now in the Ashmolean Museum
- Deposition (van Dyck, 1629), a c. 1629 painting, now in the Royal Museum of Fine Arts Antwerp
- Deposition (van Dyck, 1629–30) or Lamentation over the Dead Christ, lost 1945
- Deposition (van Dyck, 1634), a 1634 painting, now in the Alte Pinakothek in Munich
- Deposition (van Dyck, 1635), a 1635 painting, now in the now in the Royal Museum of Fine Arts Antwerp
- Deposition (van Dyck, 1640), a 1634–40 painting, now in the Valdes Izaguirre collection

== Science ==
- Deposition (chemistry), molecules settling out of a solution
- Deposition (geology), material such as sediment being added to a landform
- Deposition (phase transition), the process by which a gas is transformed into a solid
- Deposition (aerosol physics), a process where aerosol particles set down onto surfaces

== Technology ==
- Cathodic arc deposition, a physical vapor deposition technique using an electric arc to vaporize material from a cathode target
- Chemical vapor deposition, a chemical process used in the semiconductor industry to produce thin films
- Electron beam-induced deposition, a process of decomposing gaseous molecules by an electron beam
- Electrospark deposition, a micro-welding manufacturing process typically used to repair damage to mechanical components
- Electrophoretic deposition
- Ion beam-assisted deposition, a combination of ion implantation with a physical vapor deposition technique
- Molecular vapor deposition, the gas-phase reaction between surface reactive chemicals and an appropriately receptive surface
- Nanoparticle deposition, the process of attaching nanoparticles to solid surfaces called substrates to create coatings of nanoparticles
- Particle deposition, the spontaneous attachment of particles to surfaces
- Physical vapor deposition, a variety of vacuum deposition methods used to produce thin films and coatings
- Pulsed laser deposition, a physical vapor deposition technique using a high-power pulsed laser beam in a vacuum chamber

== Other uses ==
- Defrocking or deposition, the opposite of ordination in many Christian churches
- "Depositions" (Superstore), an episode of the TV series Superstore
- "The Deposition" (The Office), an episode of the TV series The Office

== See also ==
- Depo (disambiguation)
- Deposit (disambiguation)
