= Nicki Whitehouse =

British archaeologist

Nicola Jane Whitehouse

Academic background
- Education: Newcastle University (BA, 1988); Sheffield University (MSc, 1993; PhD, 2000)
- Doctoral advisor: Prof Paul Buckland; Prof Kevin Edwards

Academic work
- Discipline: Archaeology; Palaeoecology
- Sub-discipline: Environmental archaeology
- Institutions: University of Glasgow
- Website: https://www.gla.ac.uk/schools/humanities/staff/nickiwhitehouse/

Nicki Whitehouse is a British archaeologist and Environmental archaeologist. She is a Professor in Archaeological Science at the University of Glasgow.

== Education and career ==
Whitehouse has a bachelor's degree in archaeology from Newcastle University, awarded 1988; a master's degree in Environmental Archaeology and Palaeoeconomy from the University of Sheffield, awarded 1993; and a doctorate from Sheffield, awarded 2000. Her research is focused on human-environment relationships and the interface between the physical sciences and humanities.

She was Professor of human-environment systems in the School of Geography, Earth and Environmental Sciences at the University of Plymouth before taking up her current role at the University of Glasgow in 2020.

Whitehouse is a fellow of the Royal Entomological Society and Fellow of the Society of Antiquaries; she was President of the INQUA Humans and Biosphere Commission (HABCOMM) between 2011-2019. She is on the editorial board of several major journals, including Quaternary International (since 2011), Journal of Archaeological Science: Reports (since 2015), She was a member of the committee of the Association for Environmental Archaeology from 2013 to 2017, and prior to that its membership secretary.

== Research ==
Whitehouse specialises in the analysis of sub-fossil insects and the integration of this data with other environmental proxies. Her research has covered topics including the inter-relationships between archaeology, environmental and climatic change; changing biodiversity as a consequence of climate change and human impact; and the development of the cultural landscape, particularly during the transition to agriculture and land use change. Her research has been funded by the Arts and Humanities Research Council, Natural Environment Research Council, the Heritage Lottery Fund and INSTAR (Irish National Strategic Archaeological Research). She is global co-lead of the LandCover6K project with Prof Kathy Morrisson and Prof Marco Madella. She has collaborated with Meriel McClatchie, Phil Barratt, Rick Schulting, Rowan McLaughlin and Amy Bogaard. She has long standing collaborations with Tony Brown, University of Southampton, including as Co-I on AHRC funded Celtic Crannogs project. She was also a co-investigator on a European Research Council project, Fragility and sustainability in restricted island environments: adaptation, cultural change and collapse in prehistory (FRAGSUS), from 2013 to 2018. She is currently lead of a major MSCA/UKRI funded Doctoral Training Network called AGRI-DRY (with Prof Marco Madella), https://agri-dry.org, which focuses on Dryland Agriculture and Land use for Past, Present and Future Resilience, focused on African and Mediterranean landscapes. She is PI of a research network project focused on Re-wilding and the Historic Environment, funded the Royal Society of Edinburgh.

== Selected publications ==
- Brown, Antony G.; Fonville, Thierry; van Hardenbroek, Maarten; Cavers, Graeme; Crone, Anne; McCormick, Finbar; Murray, Emily; Mackay, Helen; Whitehouse, Nicki J.; Henderson, Andrew C.G.; Barratt, Phil; Davies, Kim; Head, Katie; Langdon, Peter; Alsos, Inger G.; Pirrie, Duncan (October 2022). "New integrated molecular approaches for investigating lake settlements in north-western Europe". Antiquity. 96 (389): 1179–1199. doi:10.15184/aqy.2022.70. hdl:10037/27954. S2CID 252605679.
- Brown, A. G.; Van Hardenbroek, M.; Fonville, T.; Davies, K.; Mackay, H.; Murray, E.; Head, K.; Barratt, P.; McCormick, F.; Ficetola, G. F.; Gielly, L.; Henderson, A. C. G.; Crone, A.; Cavers, G.; Langdon, P. G.; Whitehouse, N. J.; Pirrie, D.; Alsos, I. G. (3 June 2021). "Ancient DNA, lipid biomarkers and palaeoecological evidence reveals construction and life on early medieval lake settlements". Scientific Reports. 11 (1): 11807. Bibcode:2021NatSR..1111807B. doi:10.1038/s41598-021-91057-x. PMC 8175756. PMID 34083588.
- Brown, Antony G.; Rhodes, Edward J.; Davis, Steve; Zhang, Yusheng; Pears, Ben; Whitehouse, Nicki J.; Bradley, Chris; Bennett, Jenny; Schwenninger, Jean-Luc; Firth, Antony; Firth, Emma; Hughes, Paul; Walling, Des (May 2021). "Late Quaternary evolution of a lowland anastomosing river system: Geological-topographic inheritance, non-uniformity and implications for biodiversity and management". Quaternary Science Reviews. 260 106929. Bibcode:2021QSRv..26006929B. doi:10.1016/j.quascirev.2021.106929. S2CID 234870618.
- McClatchie, Meriel; Schulting, Rick; McLaughlin, Rowan; Colledge, Sue; Bogaard, Amy; Barratt, Phil; Whitehouse, Nicki (2 January 2022). "Food Production, Processing and Foodways in Neolithic Ireland". Environmental Archaeology. 27 (1): 80–92. Bibcode:2022EnvAr..27...80M. doi:10.1080/14614103.2019.1615215. hdl:10026.1/14361. S2CID 182570144.
- McLaughlin, T. Rowan; Whitehouse, Nicki J.; Schulting, Rick J.; McClatchie, Meriel; Barratt, Philip; Bogaard, Amy (June 2016). "The Changing Face of Neolithic and Bronze Age Ireland: A Big Data Approach to the Settlement and Burial Records". Journal of World Prehistory. 29 (2): 117–153. doi:10.1007/s10963-016-9093-0. hdl:10026.1/5100. S2CID 254738998.
- Lancelotti, Carla; Zurro, Debora; Whitehouse, Nicki J.; Kramer, Karen L.; Madella, Marco; García-Granero, Juan José; Greaves, Russell D. (2016). "Resilience of small-scale societies' livelihoods: a framework for studying the transition from food gathering to food production". Ecology and Society. 21 (4). doi:10.5751/ES-08757-210408. hdl:10230/44610. JSTOR 26269996. S2CID 3286766.
- Whitehouse, Nicki J.; Schulting, Rick J.; McClatchie, Meriel; Barratt, Phil; McLaughlin, T. Rowan; Bogaard, Amy; Colledge, Sue; Marchant, Rob; Gaffrey, Joanne; Bunting, M. Jane (November 2014). "Neolithic agriculture on the European western frontier: the boom and bust of early farming in Ireland". Journal of Archaeological Science. 51: 181–205. Bibcode:2014JArSc..51..181W. doi:10.1016/j.jas.2013.08.009.
- Whitehouse, Nicki J., ed. (2008). North of Ireland: Field Guide. Quaternary Research Association. ISBN 978-0-907780-77-9.
- Murphy, Eileen M.; Whitehouse, Nicki J., eds. (2007). Environmental Archaeology in Ireland. Oxbow Books. ISBN 978-1-78297-478-9.
