= Subfields of archaeology =

List of academic sub-disciplines

Archaeological subfields are typically characterised by a focus on a specific method, type of material, geographical, chronological, or other thematic categories. Among academic disciplines, archaeology, in particular, often can be found in cross-disciplinary research due to the inherent multidisciplinary and geographical nature of the field in general. The lived human experience is vast and varied and reconstructing those lifeways and their consequences requires problem solving from numerous angles. In general, archaeologists work backwards with their research, starting with what is already known.

== By time ==
=== By historicity ===
Another main division of archaeology distinguishes:

- Historical archaeology, which examines civilizations that left behind written records; and
- Prehistoric archaeology, which concerns itself with societies that did not have writing systems. However, the term is generally valid only in Europe and Asia where literate societies emerged without colonial influence. In areas where literacy arrived relatively late, it is more convenient to use other terms to divide up the archaeological record.

In areas of semi-literacy the term

- Protohistoric archaeology can be adopted to cover the study of societies with very limited written records. One example of a protohistoric site is Fort Ross on the northern California coast, which included settlements of literate Russians and non-literate American Indians and Alaska natives;
- Ethnoarchaeology is the study of modern societies resembling extinct ones of archaeological interest, for archaeological purposes. It is often difficult to infer solid conclusions about the structure and values of ancient societies from their material remains, not only because objects are mute and say little about those who crafted and used them, but also because not all objects survive to be uncovered by scholars of a later age. Ethnoarchaeology seeks to determine, for instance, what kinds of objects used in a living settlement are deposited in middens or other places where they may be preserved, and how likely an object is to be discarded near to the place where it was used.
- Taphonomy is the study of how objects decay and degrade over time. This information is critical to the interpretation of artefacts and other objects, so that the work of ancient people can be differentiated from the later work of living creatures and elemental forces.

=== By time period ===
A selective list of sub-disciplines distinguished by time-period might include:

- Palaeolithic archaeology studies the earliest period of human history, focusing on stone tools and early humans.
- Mesolithic archaeology examines the transitional period between the Paleolithic and Neolithic, often marked by hunter-gatherer societies.
- Neolithic archaeology explores the advent of agriculture and more settled communities.
- Bronze Age archaeology investigates the period characterized by the use of early metallurgy including bronze tools and the rise of early civilizations with large cultural footprints.
- Medieval archaeology is the study of post-Roman European archaeology until the sixteenth century.
- Post-medieval archaeology is the study of material culture in Europe from the 16th century onwards.
- Historical archaeology is the study of the past using both material evidence (i.e. artifacts and their contexts) and documentary evidence (including maps, photographs and film). Usually this is associated with the Americas.
- Industrial archaeology focuses on the preservation of material relics of the Industrial Revolution or the archaeology of work.
- Modern archaeology is the study of modern society using archaeological methods, e.g. the Tucson Garbage Project.

More regional specific categories include:

- Classical archaeology is the study of the past using both material evidence (i.e. artifacts and their contexts) and documentary evidence (including maps, literature of the time, other primary sources, etc.). Classical archaeology specifically pertains to the Mediterranean area and the archaeology of Greece and its surrounding areas.
- Viking Age archaeology examines the material culture and societal structures of the Viking Age in Scandinavia.

== By geography ==
Some archaeologists fall into regional or categorical groupings based on geography; these include:

- African archaeology – Archaeology conducted in Africa
- Archaeology of the Americas – Study of the archaeology of North, Central and South America and the Caribbean
- Australian archaeology
- European archaeology
- Landscape archaeology – Sub-discipline of archaeology and archaeological theory
- Maritime archaeology – Archaeological study of human interaction with the sea
- Near Eastern archaeology – Archaeological sub-discipline
- Urban archaeology – Archaeological sub-discipline

== By civilization or cultural grouping ==
Certain civilizations and cultural groups have attracted so much attention that their study has been specifically named. These sub-disciplines include:

- Assyriology (Mesopotamia),
- Classical archaeology (Greece and Rome),
- Etruscology (Etruria),
- Egyptology (Egypt),
- Indology (India),
- Islamic archaeology
- Phoenician-Punic archaeology (Phoenicia and its colonies), and
- Sinology (China).

== By cultural object or event ==
- Archaeology of religion and ritual
- Archaeomusicology
- Biblical archaeology – Archaeological sub-discipline
- Battlefield archaeology – Sub-discipline of Archaeology
- Calceology – Study of footwear
- Lithic analysis – Scientific analysis of chipped stone artifacts
- Folklore research
- Numismatics – Study of currencies, coins and paper money

== By theory ==
Some archaeologists prefer to approach their research from various philosophical and political lenses. These include:

- Feminist archaeology – Subdiscipline of archaeology (See also: Gender archaeology)
- Marxist archaeology – Subfield using dialectical materialism
- Processual archaeology – Theoretical paradigm in archaeology
- Post-processual archaeology – Theoretical paradigm in archaeology
- Some archaeologists also specialise in debunking and challenging the claims of pseudoarchaeology.

== By method ==
Many subdisciplines, notably from the Environmental and archaeological sciences, are often grouped by their methods. These subfields are often heavily disciplinary with other departments. These include:

- Aerial archaeology
- Anthracology – Study of preserved charcoal remains
- Archaeoastronomy – Interdisciplinary study of astronomies in cultures
- Archaeobiology
- Archaeobotany – Study of plants used by people in ancient times
- Archaeogenetics – Study of ancient DNA
- Archival research – Type of research using evidence from archival records
- Bioarchaeology – Sub-discipline of archaeology
- Archaeoinformatics having two sub categories
  - Computational archaeology – Archaeological sub-discipline (See also: Statistics)
  - Digital archaeology – Application of digital technology to archaeology
- Experimental archaeology involves attempting to re-enact past processes to test theories about ancient manufacturing, engineering and the effects of time on sites and objects (for example: flintknapping)
- Osteoarchaeology – Sub-discipline of archaeology
- Palaeoecology – Study of interactions between organisms and their environments across geologic timescales
- Paleoethnobotany – Study of plants used by people in ancient times
- Paleopathology – Scientific study of ancient diseases and injuries
- Zooarchaeology – Analysis of animal remains found in archaeological sites (see also: Archaeozoology)

Specific methods include:

- Chronological dating – Methods for estimating a realistic date for an event or object
- Geophysical survey (archaeology) – Non-invasive physical sensing techniques used for archaeological imaging or mapping
- GIS in archaeology – System to capture, manage, and present geographic data
- Magnetic survey (archaeology) – Magnetic detection of archaeological artefacts and features
- Remote sensing in archaeology

== Other sub-disciplines ==
The following is a list of other sub-disciplines. Some of these are not areas of study in their own right, and are only methods to be used in larger projects. This non-exhaustive list includes:

- Epigraphy
- Forensic archaeology - the application of archaeological techniques to criminal investigations. It has become particularly prominent in the investigation of mass-killings associated with war crimes.
- Garbology
- Museum studies - the display and interpretation of past remains for the public
- Recceology - the study of warfare and the means of warfare from an archaeological perspective
- Settlement archaeology - "The study of the internal structure, arrangement, distribution, and relationships of ancient settlements in the context of their environmental setting and landscape position."

Post-excavation analysis and heritage preservation also make use of a wide variety of further techniques.

== See also ==
- Art history
- Historical anthropology
