= National Bank of Uzbekistan =

Bank in Uzbekistan

Coordinates: 41°20′09″N 69°17′01″E

National Bank for foreign economic activity of the Republic of Uzbekistan

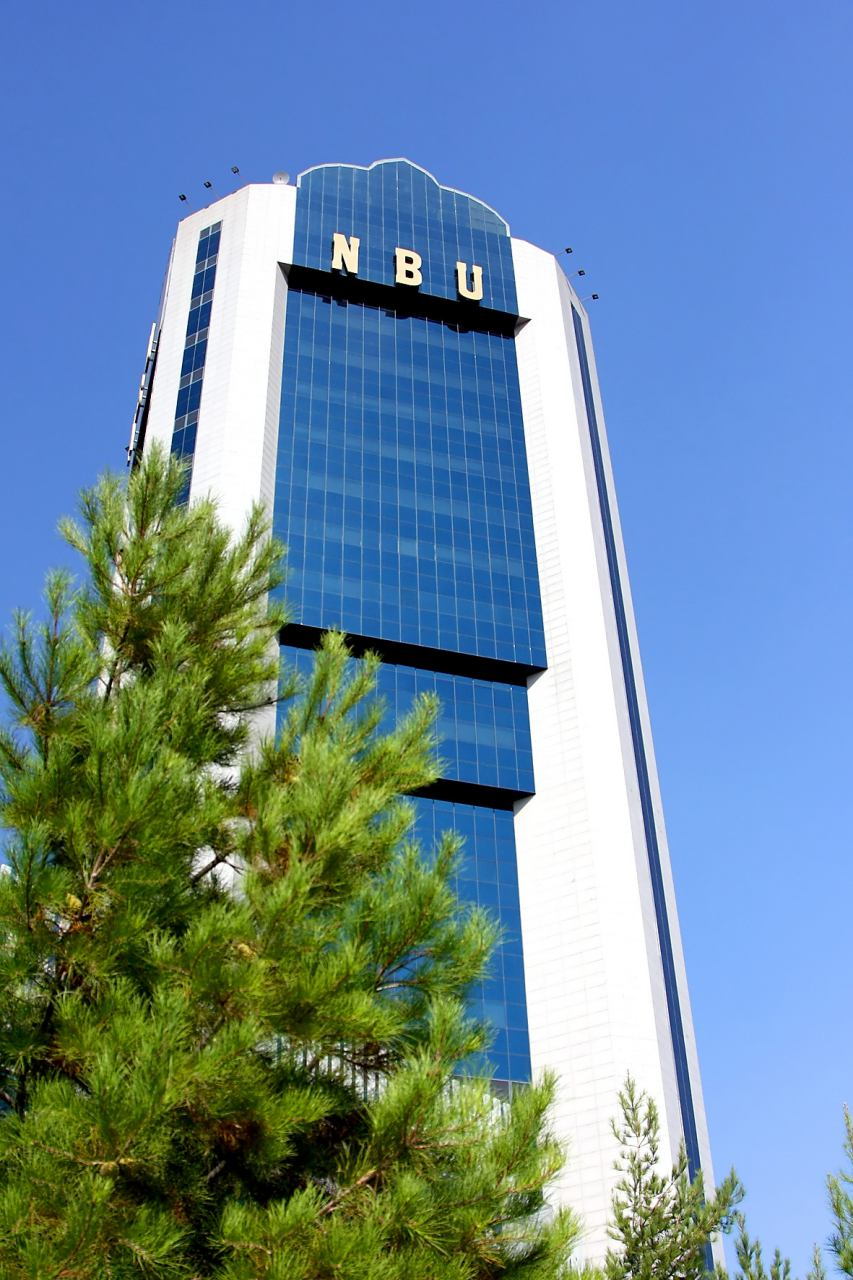
- Type: joint stock company
- Founded: 1991; 35 years ago
- Headquarters: Tashkent, Republic of Uzbekistan
- Key people: Alisher Mirsoatov
- Net income: 983,32 billion soum (01.01.2022)
- Total assets: 89 919,41 billion soum (01.01.2022)
- Total equity: 14 584,59 billion soum (01.01.2022)
- Number of employees: 5823
- Website: www.nbu.uz/en

National Bank of the Republic of Uzbekistan for Foreign Economic Activity' Joint Stock Company (Uzbek National Bank or NBU RUz; uzbek - O‘zbekiston Respublikasi Tashqi iqtisodiy faoliyat milliy banki) or the National Bank of Uzbekistan (NBU) is a universal commercial bank in Uzbekistan. It's the largest bank in the country and accounts for around a quarter of the aseets of the banking system.

The bank is owned by the Foundation for Reconstruction and Development of Uzbekistan and the Ministry of Economics and Finance. It operates as an investment bank for national development projects, as an export-import bank supporting economic cooperation and a commercial bank that provides services to individuals and organizations.

== History ==
NBU was established by Islam Karimov on September 7, 1991, as a unitary enterprise. The bank started operations on October 7, 1991, with one hundred staff. The first office of the bank was located at 23, Akhunbabayeva street.

In 2019, NBU was transformed from a unitary enterprise whose capital was held by the Government of Uzbekistan into a joint stock company owned by the Foundation for Reconstruction and Development of Uzbekistan and the Ministry of Economics and Finance.

== Operations ==
NBU is the largest bank in Uzbekistan accounts for around a quarter of the assets of the banking system. It's the largest retail deposit holder in the country and also holds deposits governmental offices, public sector entities, and state-owned enterprises. Roughly a half of its loan portfolio is represented by the projects in industries prioritized by the government. The bank also provides commercial services to individuals and organizations.

The bank has 90 offices in Uzbekistan and a subsidiary bank in Russia, the Asia-Invest Bank. In 2025, Russian investigative journalists reported that the European Union considered sanctions against the NBU, which could lead to disconnection from the SWIFT network. Since 2020, NBU is a part of the Russian SPFS network launched as an equivalent for SWIFT.

NBU has around 700 correspondent banks in 80 countries, including JPMorgan Chase, Citibank, The Bank of New York Mellon, Commerzbank, Deutsche Bank, Societe Generale, Credit Suisse, Sumitomo Mitsui Banking Corporation, MUFG Bank, Sberbank of Russia, VTB Bank, and others.

== Retail banking ==
In 1993, NBU joined Visa International. Since 1994, it started issuing Visa cards (Uzbekistani sum cards since 1996). In 1997, NBU for the first time in Uzbekistan introduced a payroll project for The Coca-Cola Company. In 2016, NBU joined MasterCard International.

NBU operates its own international money transfers system AsiaExpress and supports other popular remittance services providers, such as Migom, MoneyGram, Contact, Leader, Unistream, and Zolotaya Korona.

In 2021, the bank launched a joint BNPL (buy now, pay later) service in cooperation with a fintech platform Solfy. The bank provided its financial infrastructure and debt financing. Solfy's early investor, Sberbank of Russia's ex-first deputy CEO Maksim Poletaev joined NBU's supervisory board in March 2023 and had remained the member of the board until March 2024.

In Fall 2025, the bank has allegedly withdrew the initial agreement to prolong the debt and initiated the debt enforcement proceedings. The startup attempted to negotiate the solution with no success. In March 2026, the CEO of the Solfy's Tashkent office was detained on financial charges. Solfy's legal advisors considered the event the abuse of force and informal ties between NBU's chairman Alisher Mirsoatov and his brother, deputy prosecutor of Tashkent Khabibula Mirsoatov.

== Investments ==
NBU is one of the key development corporations in Uzbekistan. It invests in projects of state and social importance in the fields of infrastructure, logistics, industry, healthcare, etc. In the 2020s, the bank put emphasis on retail lending, but also provided a significant amount of policy-based loans. In many cases, the bank received state guarantees that helped mitigate the project-related risks.

== Financial results ==
In 2025, the bank's assets totaled 145.2 trillion billion sum, deposits to 49.2 trillion sum, equity to 19,4 trillion sum. NBU's profit amounted to 13% of aggregated profit of the whole bank industry in Uzbekistan.

The bank held 21.2 trillion sun in retail loans, including 13 trillion in mortage. Loans to small and medium enterprises totaled 2.52 trillion sum. The shared of bad debt was around 3,3% (compared to the industry average of 3.7%). The bank maintained a low cost-to-income ratio of 31.1%.

In 2020, NBU operated 68 branches and 43 financial services centers in Uzbekistan, operated 103 currency exchange offices, 309 ATMs and 332 kiosks. The bank had over 4 billion retail clients and provided services to 165 thousand organizations and 87 thousand individual entrepreneurs. Over 195 thousand clients used the bank's mobile app Milliy..

== Ratings ==
The NBU is a credit and financial institution of the country rated by such international agencies as Moody’s Investors Service and Standard & Poor’s. The receiving and confirmation of high marks from leading international rating agencies remains relevant and important for the NBU.

December 24, 2018, was marked by an increase in long-term credit rating by Standard & Poor’s international rating agency from 'B+' to 'BB−'.

Credit ratings (as of 1 July 2019)
National Bank of Uzbekistan
Agency	Rating	Evaluation
Moody’s	The outlook for all ratings	Stable
Moody’s	On deposits in national currency	B1
Moody’s	On deposits in foreign currency	B2
Moody’s	Financial stability of the bank (BFSR)	E+
Standard & Poor's	Long-term rating	BB-
Standard & Poor's	Short-term rating	
