= Environmental archaeology =

Sub-discipline of archaeology

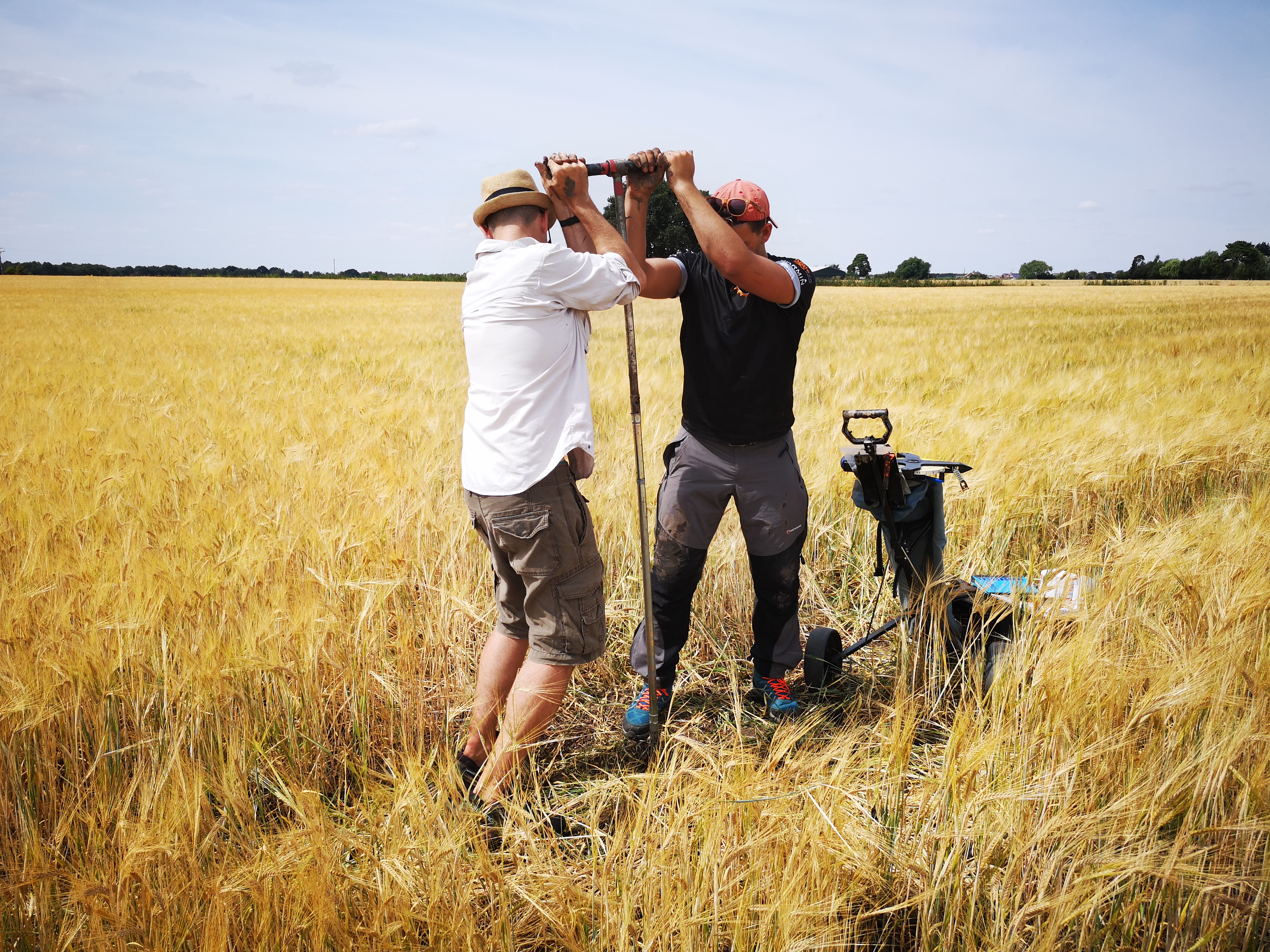
Geoarchaeological survey of stratigraphic units using a versatile coring unit, a common tool for environmental archaeologists.

Environmental archaeology is a sub-discipline of archaeology which emerged in the 1970s and seeks to use archaeological data to reconstruct the relationships between past societies and the environments they lived in. It utilizes approaches from paleoecology to study past environments through the methods of human paleoecology and other geosciences. Reconstructing past environments and past peoples' relationships and interactions with the landscapes they inhabited provides archaeologists with insights into the origins and evolution of anthropogenic environments and human systems. This includes subjects such as prehistoric lifestyle adaptations to change and how economic practices have affected the environment.

Environmental archaeology often involves studying plant and animal remains in order to investigate which plant and animal species were present at the time of past habitations, and how past societies managed and interacted with them. It may also involve studying the physical environment and how similar or different it was in the past compared to the present day. An important component of such analyses represents the study of site formation processes.

This field is particularly relevant when artifacts may be absent from an excavated or surveyed site, or in cases of earth movement, such as erosion, which may have buried artifacts and archaeological features. While specialist sub-fields, for example bioarchaeology or geomorphology, are defined by the materials they study, the term "environmental" is used as a general template in order to denote a general field of scientific inquiry that is applicable across time periods and geographical regions studied by archaeology as a whole.

== Subfields ==
=== Archaeobotany ===
Archaeobotany is the study and interpretation of plant remains. By determining the uses of plants in historical contexts, researchers can reconstruct the diets of past humans, as well as determine their Subsistence economy strategies and plant economy. This provides greater insight into a people's social and cultural behaviors. Analysis of specimen like wood charcoal, for example, can reveal the source of fuel or construction for a society. Archaeobotanists also often study seed and fruit remains, along with pollen and starch. Plants can be preserved in a variety of ways, but the most common are carbonization, water logging, mineralization, and desiccation. A field within archaeobotany is ethnobotany, which looks more specifically at the relationship between plants and humans, and the cultural impacts plants have had and continue to have on human societies. Plant usage as food and as crops or as medicine is of interest, as well the plants' economic influences.

=== Zooarchaeology ===
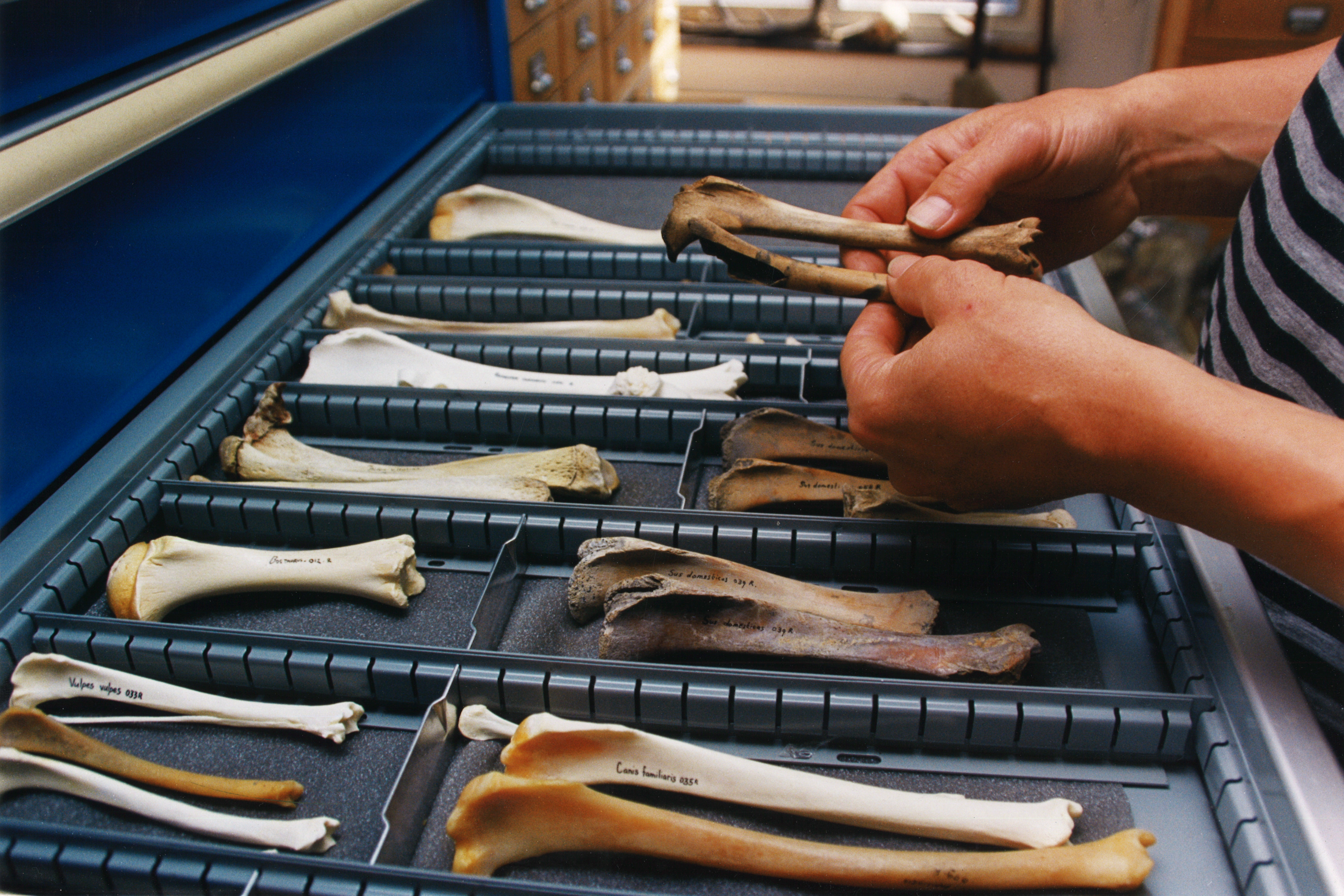
A comparative collection being used to identify zooarchaeological remains

Zooarchaeology is the study and interpretation of animal remains and what these remains can tell us about past human diets, behaviors, and history. Through the analysis of the physical features of animal remains, evidence of extractive behaviors such as hunting as well as domestication can be demonstrated. These data are interpreted as a reflection of the changes that humans have caused to the environment, such as the depletion or overharvesting of animal populations over time. As with other zooarchaeological applications, in environmental archaeology, data gathered from faunal analyses can often be either species-specific or involve multi-species analysis. These primary data are obtained from the excavation of archaeological features, which can include both waste disposal areas as well as items made from modified animal materials. Additionally, faunal studies implement biomolecular methods such as stable isotopes, Zooarchaeology by Mass Spectrometry (ZooMS), and ancient DNA to provide insight into the lives of past animal populations. These methods have been leveraged to demonstrate anthropogenic environmental change via overhunting, habitat destruction, and declining genetic diversity.

=== Geoarchaeology ===
Geoarchaeology is the study of landscape and of geological processes. It looks at environments within the human timeline to determine how past societies may have influenced or been influenced by the environment. Sediment and soil are often studied because this is where the majority of artifacts are found, but also because natural processes and human behavior can alter the soil and reveal its history. Apart from visual observation, computer programming and satellite imaging are often employed to reconstruct past landscapes or architecture.

=== Other related fields ===
Due to the multidisciplinary nature of archaeology in general, the range of research in the earth and environmental sciences, and possibility of methodologies, environmental archaeology has branched and connected with a number of other fields to include numerous cross and subfields such as:

- aerial archaeology
- anthracology – Study of preserved charcoal remains
- archaeoastronomy – Interdisciplinary study of astronomies in cultures
- archaeobiology
- archaeoentomology
- archaeological geophysics – Non-invasive physical sensing techniques used for archaeological imaging or mapping
- archaeological science – Application of scientific techniques to archaeology
- archaeomagnometry – Magnetic detection of archaeological artefacts and features
- archival research – Type of research using evidence from archival records
- bioarchaeology and human ecology
- coastal archaeology
- computational archaeology – Archaeological sub-discipline
- environmental history – Specialisation of history
- geomorphology – Scientific study of landforms
- landscape archaeology – Sub-discipline of archaeology and archaeological theory
- landscape history – Study of changes in the physical environment caused by human activities
- maritime archaeology – Archaeological study of human interaction with the sea
- palaeoclimatology – Study of changes in ancient climate
- palaeoecology – Study of interactions between organisms and their environments across geologic timescales
- Quaternary research
- remote sensing
- as well as fields related to various chronological dating techniques; including radiocarbon dating, luminescence dating, and archaeomagnetic dating.

== Significance ==
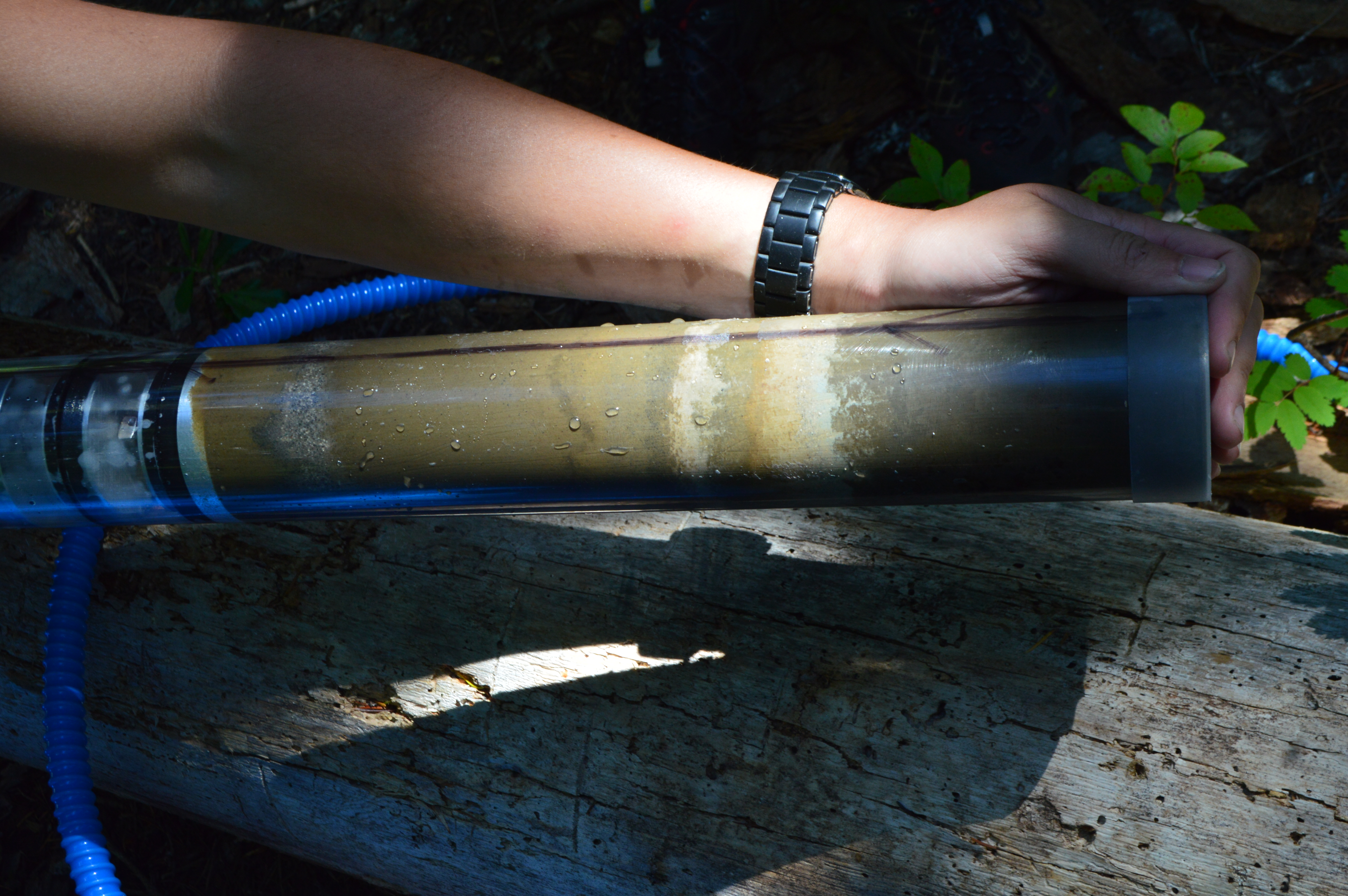
Lake sediment core used to help archaeologists reconstruct past climates.

Each focus within environmental archaeology collects information about a different aspect of humans' relation with their surrounding environment. Together these components (along with methods from other fields) are combined to fully understand a past society's lifestyle and interactions with their environment. Past aspects of land use, food production, tool use, and occupation patterns can all be established and the knowledge applied to current and future human-environment interactions. Through predation, agriculture, and introduction of foreign biota into new environments, humans have altered past environments. Understanding these past processes can help us pursue conservation and restorative processes in the present.

Environmental archaeology provides insight on sustainability and why some cultures collapsed while others survived. Societal collapse has occurred many times throughout history, one of the most prominent examples being the Maya civilization. Using lake sediment core and climate reconstruction technology discussed earlier, archaeologists were able to reconstruct the climate present at the time of the Mayans. Although the Yucatán Peninsula was found to have extreme drought at the time Mayan society collapsed, many other factors contributed to their demise. Deforestation, overpopulation, and manipulating wetlands are only a few theories as to why the Maya civilization collapsed, but all of these worked in tandem to negatively impact the environment. From a sustainability perspective, studying how the Mayans impacted the environment allows researchers to see how these changes have permanently affected the landscape and subsequent populations living in the area.

Archaeologists are increasingly under pressure to demonstrate that their work has impact beyond the discipline. This has prompted environmental archaeologists to argue that an understanding of past environmental changes is essential to model future outcomes in areas such as climate change, land cover change, soil health and food security.

== Methods ==
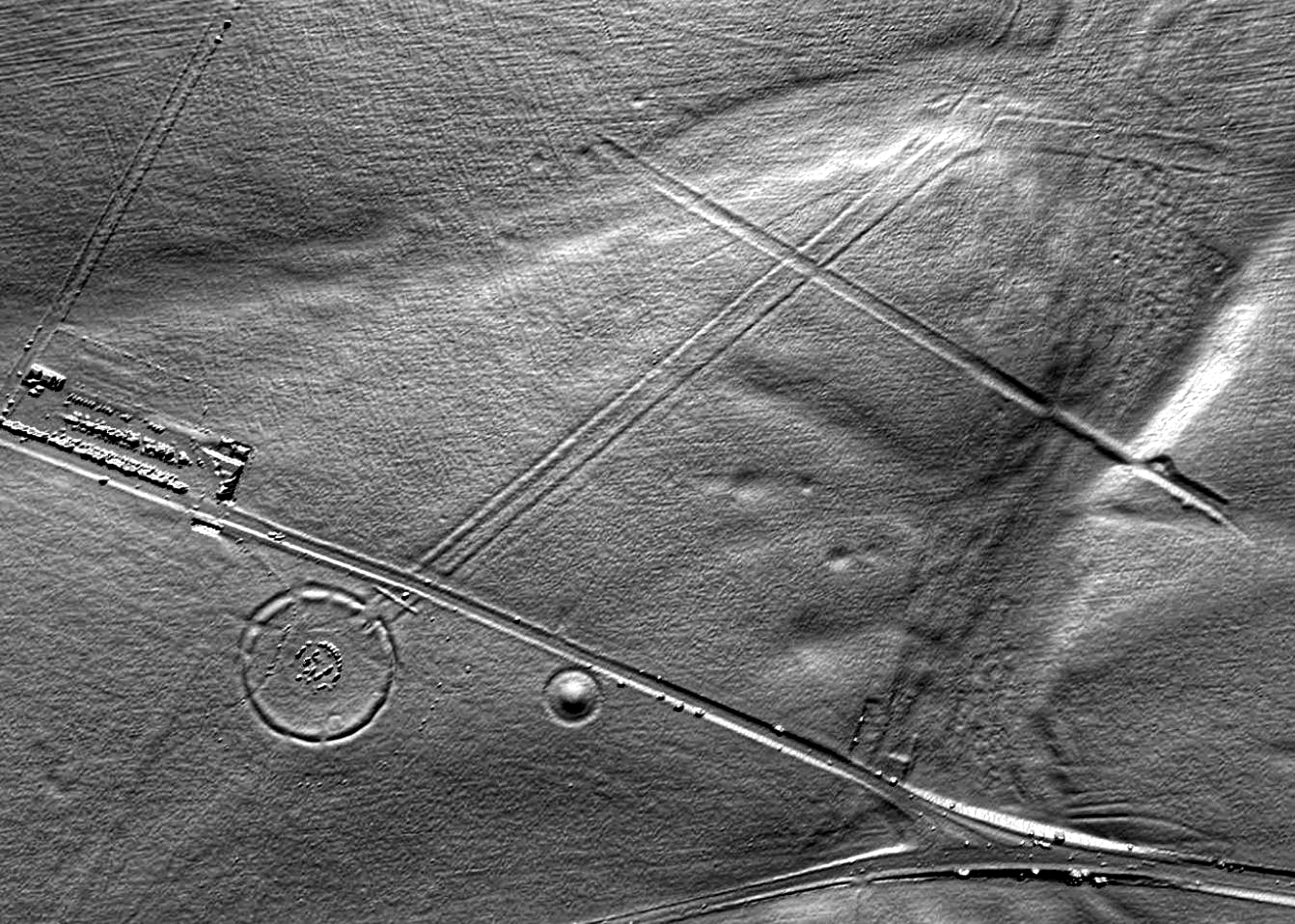
LiDAR maps are a GIS tool used in archaeology to locate three-dimensional surface features.

Environmental archaeologists approach a site through evaluation and/or excavation. Evaluation seeks to analyze the resources and artifacts given in an area and their potential significance. Excavation takes samples from different layers in the ground and uses a similar strategy to evaluation. The samples typically sought after are human and faunal remains, pollen and spores, wood and charcoal, insects, and even isotopes. Biomolecules like lipids, proteins, and DNA can be revelatory samples. With respect to geoarchaeology, computer systems for topography and satellites imaging are often used to reconstruct landscapes. The Geographic Information System (GIS) is a computer system that can process spatial data and construct virtual landscapes. Climate records are able to be reconstructed through paleoclimatology proxies, which can provide information on temperatures, precipitation, vegetation, and other climate-dependent conditions. These proxies can be used to provide context for present climate and compare past climate against the present.

== History ==
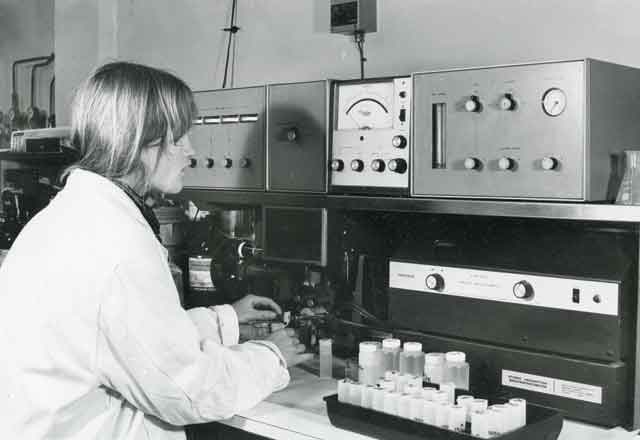
The human environment department of the UCL Institute of Archaeology in the 1970s.

Environmental archaeology has emerged as a distinct discipline since the second half of the 20th century. In recent years it has grown rapidly in significance and is now an established component of most excavation projects. The field is multidisciplinary, and environmental archaeologists, as well as palaeoecologists, work side by side with archaeologists and anthropologists specialising in material culture studies in order to achieve a more holistic understanding of past human livelihood and people-environment interactions, especially how climatic stress affected humans and forced them to adapt.

In archaeology in the 1960s, the environment was seen as having a "passive" interaction with humans. With the inclusion of Darwinism and ecological principles, however, this paradigm began to shift. Prominent theories and principles of the time (oasis theory, catastrophism, and longue duree) emphasized this philosophy. Catastrophism, for instance, discussed how catastrophes like natural disaster could be the determining factor in a society's survival. The environment could have social, political, and economic impacts on human communities. It became more important for researchers to look at the direct influence the environment could have on a society. This gave rise to middle range theory and the major questions asked by environmental archaeology in the 20th and 21st centuries. Research has since led environmental archaeology to two major conclusions: humanity originated in Africa and agriculture originated in south-west Asia. Another important shift in thinking within the field centered around the notion of cost-effectivity. Before, archaeologists thought that humans usually acted to maximize their use of resources, but have since come to believe that this is not the case. Subsequent theories/principles include sociality and agency, and the focus on relationships between archaeological sites. Government research audits and the 'commercialisation' of environmental archaeology have also shaped the sub-discipline in more recent times.

=== Notable contributors ===
- John Birks, a botanist and emeritus professor at the University of Bergen and University College London, is renowned for his novel quantitative techniques in Quaternary palaeoecology. His extensive research focuses on the vegetational and environmental history of the past 10–20,000 years across various regions, including Fennoscandia, the United Kingdom, Minnesota, the Yukon, Siberia, and Tibet.
- Don Brothwell (1933–2016), was a distinguished British archaeologist and anthropologist, who specialised in human palaeoecology and environmental archaeology. His career spanned several prominent institutions including the University of Cambridge, the British Museum, and the University of London, the University of York. Brothwell was celebrated as a pioneer in archaeological science, contributing extensively to the study of human and animal remains, and founding the Journal of Archaeological Science.
- Karl Butzer is a notable pioneer of environmental archaeology and has won numerous awards and conducted research in the fields of archaeology, geography, and geology.
- Eric Higgs researched the development of agriculture in Asia and the method of "site catchment analysis", which looks at the exploitation of land based on the land's potential.
- Douglas Kennett is a controversial environmental archaeologist and human behavioral ecologist known for his work investigating how climate change affected Maya civilization in its development and disintegration. and for his contributions as a member of the Comet Research Group to the controversial and disputed Younger Dryas impact hypothesis (YDIH) which asserts that the Clovis culture was destroyed by a shower of comets. The YDIH has been comprehensively refuted by a team of experts in impact physics, archaeology, and other related fields. His most widely disseminated paper was a collaboration with biblical archaeologists who believe they have discovered the ancient city of Sodom at Tell el-Hammam, Jordon, and that it was destroyed by a comet. On February 15, 2023, the following editor's note was posted on this paper, "Readers are alerted that concerns raised about the data presented and the conclusions of this article are being considered by the Editors. A further editorial response will follow the resolution of these issues." On April 24, 2025, Nature issued a formal retraction note, citing concerns about methodology, analysis, and data interpretation.
- Louis Leakey contributed to a vast amount of research in this field. Leakey and his wife Mary Leakey are most known for their work on human origins in Africa. Lewis Binford developed the middle range theory. Under this theory, researchers study the relationship between humans and the environment, which can be depicted in models.
- Cathy Whitlock, an Earth Scientist and Professor at Montana State University, specializing in Quaternary environmental change and palaeoclimatology. She is most known for her research on "palaeofire," which uses sediment cores to reconstruct historical vegetation, fire, and climate patterns (particularly post-Yellowstone fires). Whitlock has significantly contributed to academic understandings of climate dynamics and encouraging informed conservation efforts and was elected to the National Academy of Sciences in 2018.
- Janet Wilmshurst, a New Zealand-based palaeoecologist who has researched fossil records to examine relationships between human settlements and natural disturbances, including novel methods of carbon-dated rat-gnawed seeds to trace Polynesian settlements over time.

== See also ==
- Archaeology of Hatfield and Thorne
- Archaeogeography
- Area of archaeological potential
- Bioanthropology
- Diatoms
- Digital Archaeology
- Disturbance (archaeology)
- Earth system science
- Environmental science
- Harris matrix
- Geoscience
- Geography (see also: Human Geography and Physical Geography)
- GIS in archaeology
- Macrofossil
- Microfossil
- Stratigraphy (archaeology)
- Subfields of archaeology
- Systems theory in archaeology
