= Deposition (van Dyck, 1619) =

Painting by Anthony van Dyck

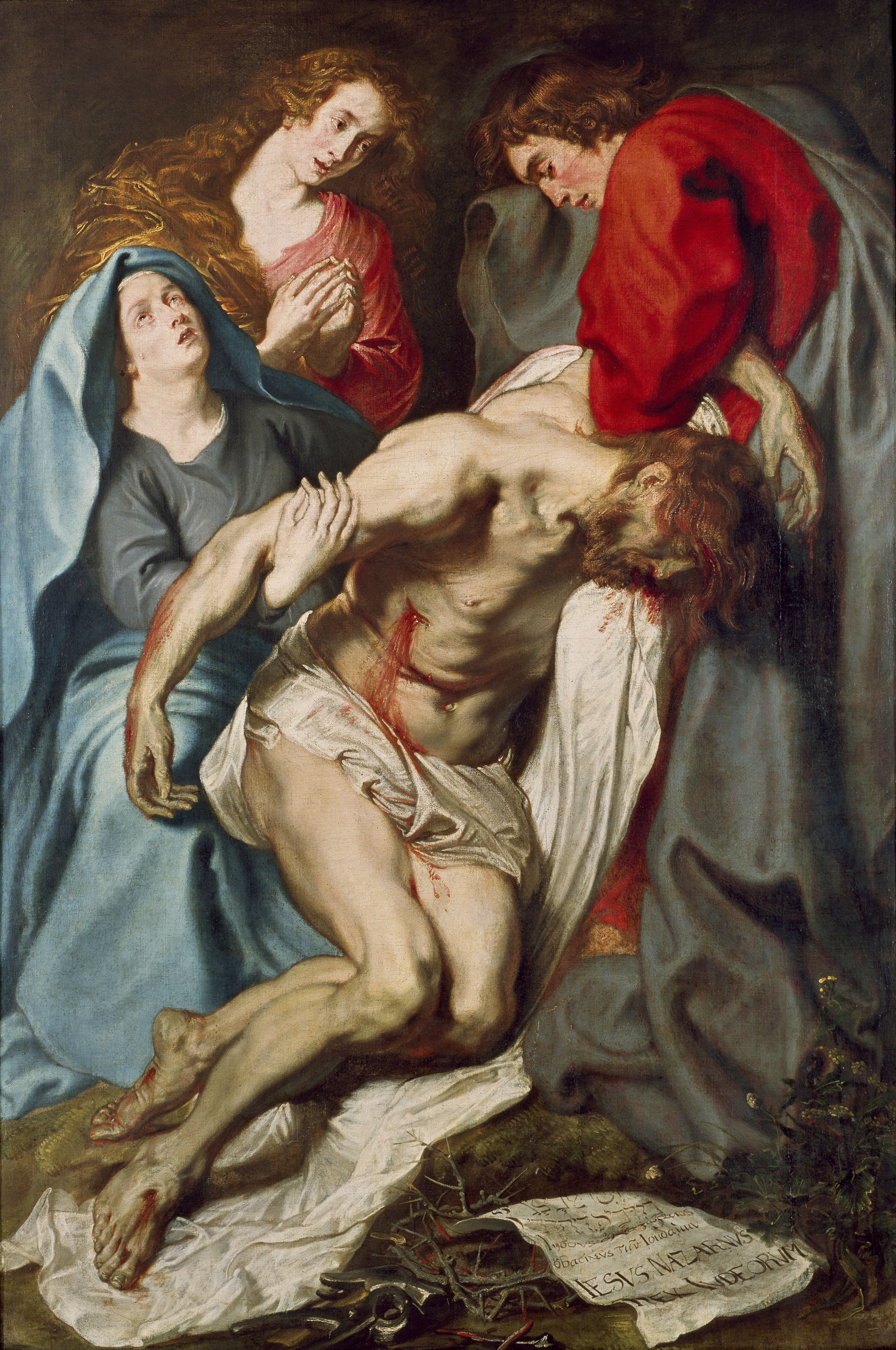
The Deposition (c. 1619) by Anthony van Dyck

The Deposition is a 1619 painting by the Flemish artist Anthony van Dyck. It dates to around 1619 and reworks his 1615 version of the same subject It is held in the Ashmolean Museum, in Oxford, where it was offered by Charles T. Maude in 1869.

== See also ==
- List of paintings by Anthony van Dyck
