= Deposit =

A deposit is generally something (often money) left somewhere.

Deposit may refer to:

== Money ==
- Deposit (finance)
- Security deposit
- A down payment or partial payment in advance
- Deposit account, a bank account that allows money to be deposited and withdrawn by the account holder
  - Demand deposit, the funds held in demand deposit accounts in commercial banks
- Damage deposit, a sum of money paid in relation to a rented item or property to ensure it is returned in good condition
- Container deposit, a deposit on a beverage container paid when purchased and refunded when returned
- Election deposit, a sum that a candidate must pay in return for the right to stand in an election

== Places ==
- Deposit (town), New York
- Deposit (village), New York

== Science ==
- Deposition (geology), material added to a landform
- Ore deposit

== Other uses ==
- Amanat (political party), also called Deposit or Nūr Otan, a major political party in Kazakhstan

== See also ==
- Deposit formation or fouling, the accumulation of unwanted material on solid surfaces
- Deposit model, a method of identifying the character and degree of survival of buried archaeological remains
- Deposit of faith or Fidei depositum, the Apostolic Constitution by which Pope John Paul II ordered the publication of the Catechism of the Catholic Church
- Deposition (disambiguation)
- Precipitation (chemistry)
