= Archaeobiology =

Archaeobiology, the study of the biology of ancient times through archaeological materials, is a subspecialty of archaeology. It can be seen as a blanket term for archaeobotany, animal osteology, zooarchaeology, microbiology, and many other sub-disciplines. Specifically, plant and animal remains are also called ecofacts. Sometimes these ecofacts can be left by humans and sometimes they can be naturally occurring. Archaeobiology tends to focus on more recent finds, so the difference between archaeobiology and palaeontology is mainly one of date: archaeobiologists typically work with more recent, non-fossilised material found at archaeological sites. Only very rarely are archaeobiological excavations performed at sites with no sign of human presence.

== Flora and Fauna in Archaeology ==
The prime interest of paleobotany is to reconstruct the vegetation that people in the past would have encountered in a particular place and time. Plant studies have always been overshadowed by faunal studies because bones are more conspicuous than plant remains when excavating. Collection of plant remains could everything including pollen, soil, diatoms, wood, plant remains and phytoliths. Phytoliths are sediments and diatoms are water deposits. Each plant remain can tell the archaeologist different things about the environment during a certain time period. Animal remains were the first evidence used by 19th century archaeologists. Today, archaeologists use faunal remains as a guide to the environment. It helps archaeologists understand whether the fauna were present naturally or through activities of carnivores or people. Archaeologists deal with macrofauna and microfauna. Microfauna are better indicators of climate and environmental change than larger species. These can be as small as a bug or as big as a fish or bird. Macrofauna helps archaeologists build a picture of past human diet.

== Bacteria and Protists in Archaeology ==
Bacteria and Protists form two separate kingdoms, but both are fairly similar when compared. Bacteria are prokaryotic microorganisms, while protists are a group of eukaryotic organisms. Because both are microorganisms, both fall under the study of microbiology and special techniques are required for archaeologists to even see them. Archaeologists, in order to find these microorganisms in a site, have to first take samples from the site and bring them in for lab analysis. Once in the lab, they can use equipment such as optical microscopes, in order to actually see evidence of micro organic remains. Archaeologists that look at these microorganisms do not actually find the living bacteria or protist, but instead find indentations left behind in material from where they had been. Depending on where the indentations were in the strata, archaeologists can determine the age of the microorganisms.

== Osteology in Archaeology ==
The study of osteology is a study of bones and can be a subdiscipline in archeology. Osteologists in archeology reconstruct bones of humans or animals from the past to find more about the past civilizations. Osteology is used in archaeology to determine the age, gender, and ethnicity of the remains. It is also helpful to rebuild past societies’ cultural background. Osteology shares past activities pursued by the ancient cultures including human and animal migrations as well as warfare. Using the remains from the past can help modern archaeologist uncover the past from what they ate to their daily activities. This can help uncover the mysteries of histories.

== Animals in Archaeology ==
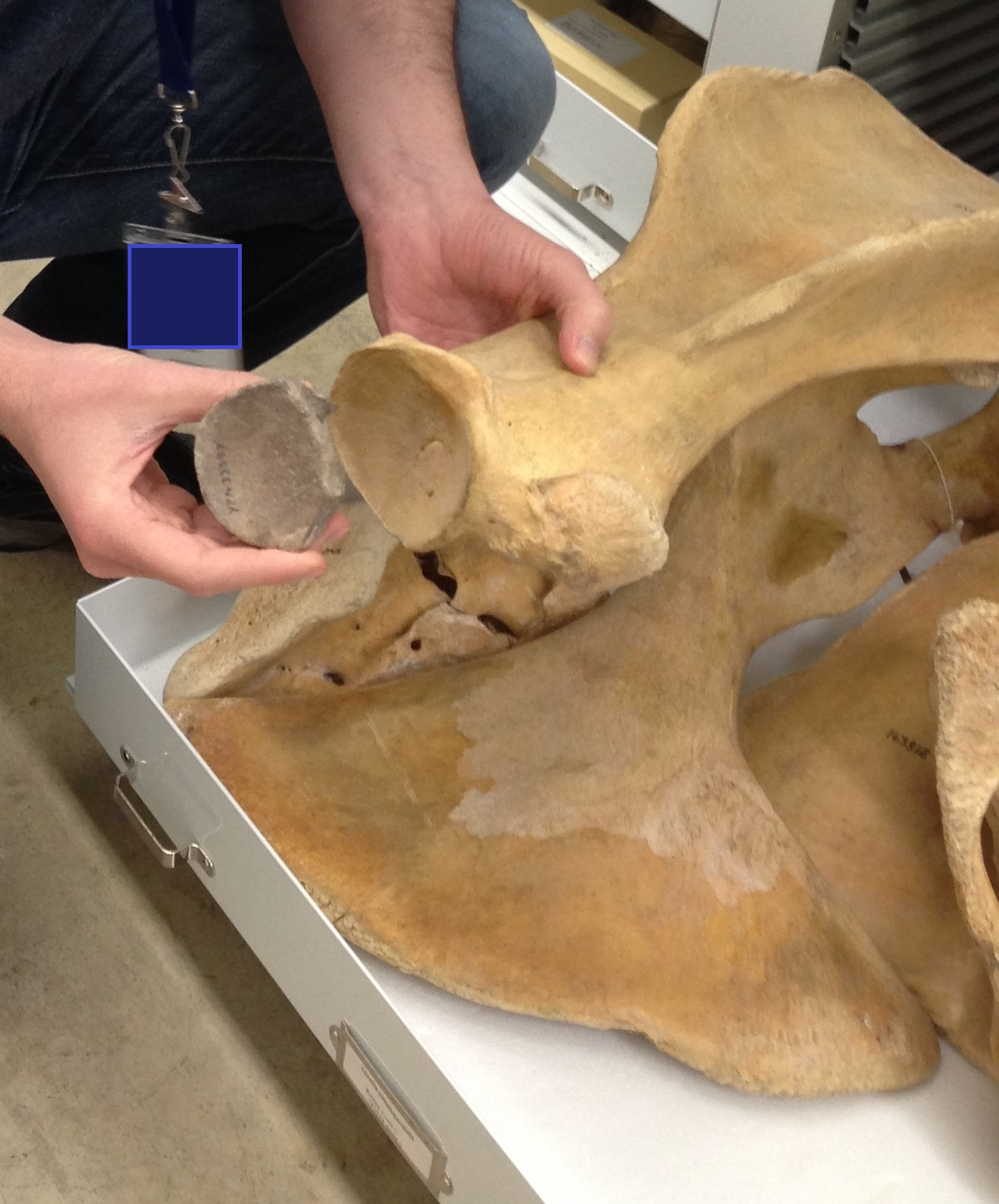
Zooarchaeology: comparing an archaeological bone to a modern bone in a comparative collection

The study of animal remains in archaeology teaches how humans and animals interacted with one another in prehistoric times. This gives an insight on how humans began domesticating animals. In zooarchaeology, studies will show the animal and human husbandry, as well as the process of cultures adding animals into their diets. Studying animals in archaeology requires the help from different fields such as zoology, anthropology, paleontology, osteology, and anatomy. Zooarchaeologists gather and observe the fragments of the bones from reptiles, mammals, amphibians, and birds around an archaeological site. Thus, they will gather context clues on how humans and animals subsided together within their environment. Through the years, humans have learned the basics of how to domesticate, breed, hunt and consume animals. This area in archaeology informs others on how humans have evolved into manipulating animals throughout prehistory and beyond.

== See also ==
- Archaeology
- Biology
- Paleoneurology
- Zooarchaeology
- Environmental archaeology
