= Depo =

Depo may refer to:

- Defence Export Promotion Organization (DEPO), a government agency in Pakistan
- Depo-Provera, a birth control injection
- Deposition (law), evidence given under oath for later use in court
- the NASDAQ trading symbol for the company Depomed
- Wacław Depo (born 1953), Roman Catholic bishop

== See also ==
- Depo Hostivař, a station on the Prague Metro
- Depoe Bay, Oregon, a city on the Pacific coast
- Depot (disambiguation), pronounced the same as "depo" in some accents
- Deposition (disambiguation)
