= Geoarchaeology =

Archaeological sub-discipline

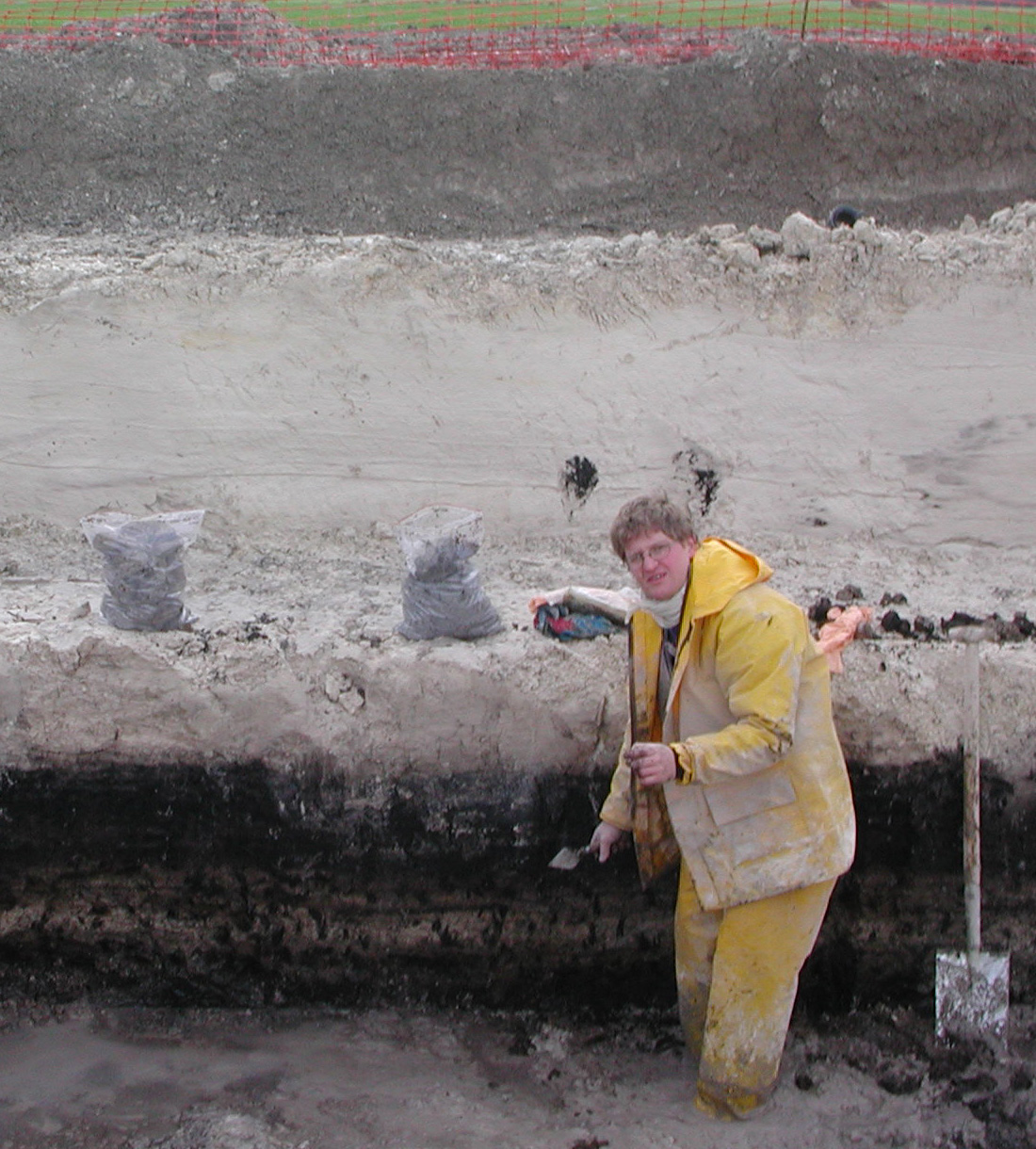
A geoarchaeologist analyzes the stratigraphy on the route of the LGV Est high-speed railway line.

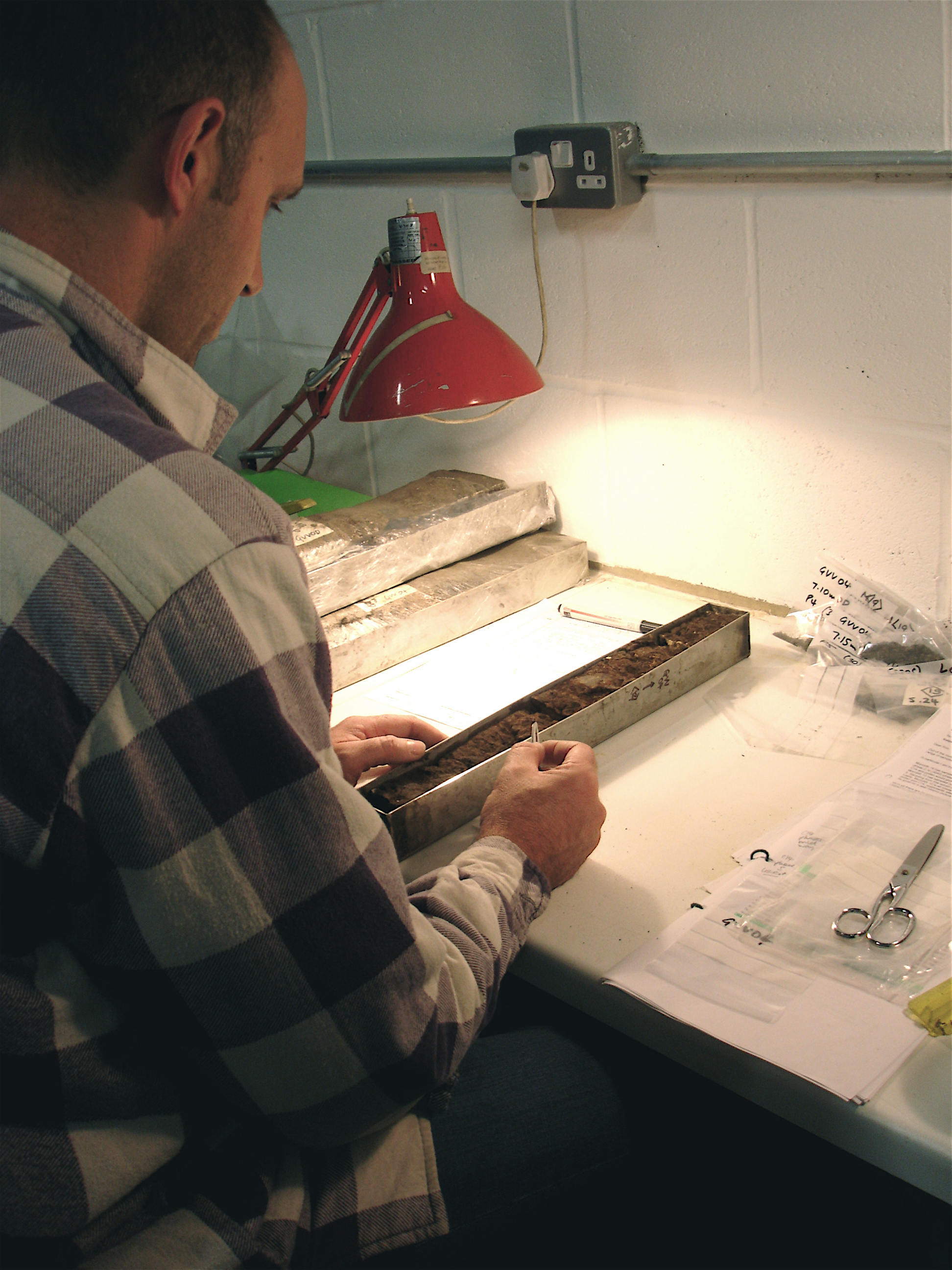
geoarchaeologist at work on column sample

Geoarchaeology is a multidisciplinary field of study that applies the theories and techniques of the geosciences to archaeology. It draws on techniques and approaches from geomorphology, sedimentology, pedology, stratigraphy, and geochronology to interpret sediments, soils, and landforms in archaeological investigations to inform archaeological and chronological knowledge and thought. Geoarchaeologists study the natural physical processes that affect archaeological sites such as geomorphology, for example, and their effects on buried sites and artifacts post-deposition.

Geoarchaeologists' work frequently involves studying the soils and sediments of archaeological sites and the surrounding region to inform archaeological research. Geoarchaeologists also frequently use tools such as computer cartography, geographic information systems (GIS), and digital elevation models (DEM) in combination with disciplines from human and social sciences and earth sciences to inform their investigations and interpretations of sites.

Geoarchaeology is important because it informs archaeologists about the geology of the site, including the geomorphology of the soil and sediment. It also places artifacts and landforms present in the site into relative and absolute temporal context to better inform archaeological interpretations.

Geoarchaeology is considered a subfield of environmental archaeology because it utilizes similar concepts and techniques and applies them to address the same archaeological problems.

== Objectives ==
There are three main objectives in most kinds of geoarchaeological investigations:

1. To place archaeological sites and their contents into their temporal context. This is done through the analysis and interpretation of the stratigraphy of the site and by using absolute dating techniques.
2. To understand the natural processes that create archaeological sites.
3. To develop landscape reconstructions of the area where the site was located to aid in interpretations of the site.

== History and Development ==
Geoarchaeological concepts and techniques have been used in both geological and archaeological investigations since the 18th century. However, scientists began to use the methods and techniques of the geosciences to interpret the archaeological record more commonly in the middle of the 19th century.

The application of stratigraphic principles to archaeological sites stems from the work of Niels Stenson (aka Nicolas Steno) in 1669 and James Hutton in 1788. Stenson’s work developed and provided a basis for the principles of superposition and original horizontality, two of the core concepts in both geoarchaeology and archaeology. Hutton’s work led to significant conclusions in the 1850s about how old the human race is. Geoscience concepts continued to be applied to archaeological investigations in this way for the next few decades, until the early 1900s, when the application of these principles to archaeological sites became more refined with the addition of more specific field and lab techniques for studying past environmental conditions and material analysis.

Geoarchaeology, as we know it today, developed as a subfield of archaeology in the 1970s-1980s through the work of multidisciplinary teams applying geoscience field techniques to their studies. Innovations in dating technology in the 1940s enabled more accurate absolute dates to be obtained from many kinds of archaeological sites, which demonstrated the value of geoscience concepts and techniques to archaeology.

== Techniques Used ==
=== Monolith Sampling ===
Monolith sampling is a geoarchaeological sampling technique that involves collecting sample cores from a section of an archaeological site to analyze and detect the buried processes that have affected the site. Narrow metal tins are hammered into the section, either by hand or by using machinery, in a sequence to collect the complete profile of the site for study. If more than one tin is needed, they are arranged in offset and overlapping positions so the complete profile can be rebuilt, typically off-site in laboratory conditions.

=== Loss on Ignition Testing ===
Loss on ignition testing for soil organic content is a technique that measures the organic content of soil samples. Samples taken from a known location in the profile, collected by column sampling, are weighed and placed in a furnace oven, which burns off the organic content. The cooked sample is then weighed again, and the resulting loss in weight of the sample indicates the organic content in the profile at a given depth. This technique is often used to detect buried soil horizons that may not be visible to the naked eye. Ancient land surfaces, especially from the prehistoric era, can be difficult to discern, so this technique is useful for evaluating an area's potential for prehistoric surfaces and archaeological evidence. Comparative measurements down the profile are made, and a sudden rise in organic content at some point in the profile, combined with other indicators, is strong evidence for buried surfaces.

=== Near-Surface Geophysical Prospection ===
Geophysical archaeological prospection methods are used to non-destructively explore and investigate possible archaeological sites buried in the subsurface. Commonly used methods include:

- Magnetometry
- Ground-penetrating radar
- Earth resistance measurements
- Electromagnetic induction measurements (including metal detection and Magnetic susceptibility surveys)
- Sonar (sidescan, single-beam or multibeam sonar, sediment sonar) in underwater archaeology

Less commonly used geophysical archaeological prospection methods include:

- Reflection or refraction seismic measurements
- Gravity measurements
- Thermography

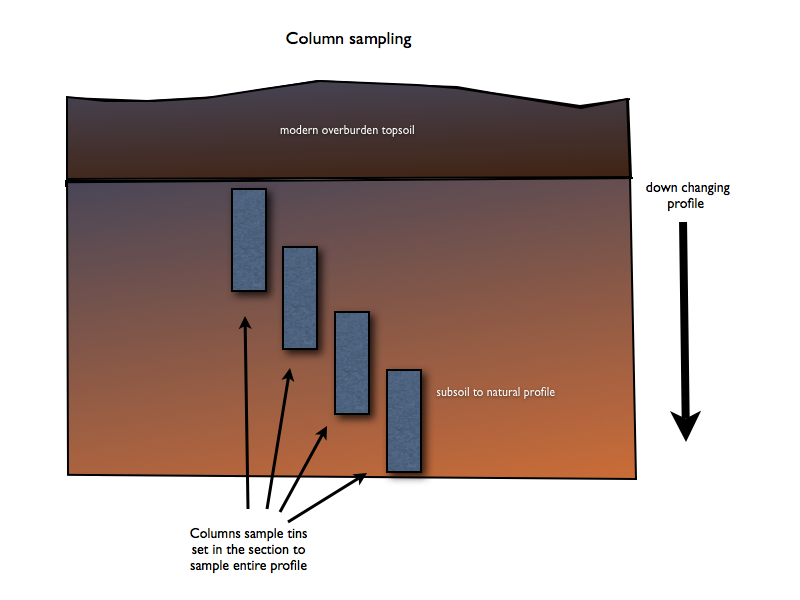
offset column sampling of the soil profile

=== GIS in Geoarchaeology ===
GIS (Geographic Information Systems) has been widely used in archaeology since the 1980s. In archaeological contexts, GIS is mainly used for managing information and for spatial analysis. Spatial analysis is its most common application in archaeology, followed closely by heritage management. GIS is also commonly used to help gather and analyze archaeological data.

=== Magnetic Susceptibility Analysis ===
The magnetic susceptibility of a material is a measure of its ability to become magnetised by an external magnetic field (Dearing, 1999). The magnetic susceptibility of soil reflects the presence of magnetic iron-oxide minerals, such as maghemite. Just because the soil contains a lot of iron does not mean that it will have high magnetic susceptibility. Magnetic forms of iron can be formed by burning and microbial activity, such as in top-soils and some anaerobic deposits. Magnetic iron compounds can also be found in igneous and metamorphic rocks.

The relationship between iron and burning means that magnetic susceptibility is often used for:

- Site prospection, which identifies areas of archaeological potential before excavation.
- Identifying hearth areas and the presence of burning residues in deposits.
- Explaining whether areas of reddening are due to burning or other natural processes such as gleying (waterlogging).

The relationship between soil formation and magnetic susceptibility means that it can also be used to:

- Identify buried soils in depositional sequences.
- Identify redeposited soil materials in peat, lake sediments, etc.

=== Phosphate and Orthophosphate Content with Spectrophotometry ===
Phosphate in man-made soils derives from people and their animals, rubbish, and bones. One hundred people excrete about 62 kg of phosphate annually, with about the same amount from their rubbish. Their animals excrete even more. The human body contains about 650 g of PO_{4} (500g, or 80%, in the skeleton), resulting in elevated levels in burial sites. Most is quickly immobilised on the clay of the soil and 'fixed', where it can persist for thousands of years. For a 1 ha site, this corresponds to about 150 kg PO_{4} ha-1yr-1, about 0.5% to 10% of that already present in most soils. Therefore, it doesn't take long for human activity to make orders-of-magnitude differences in the phosphate concentration in soil. Phosphorus exists in different 'pools' in the soil 1) organic (available), 2) occluded (adsorbed), 3) bound (chemically bound). Each of these pools can be extracted using progressively more aggressive chemicals. Some workers (Eidt, especially) think that the ratios between these pools can give information about past land use, and perhaps even dating.

Whatever method is used to get the phosphorus from the soil into solution, the process of detecting it is usually the same. This uses the 'molybdate blue' reaction, where the depth of the colour is proportional to phosphorus concentration. In the lab, this is measured using a colorimeter, in which light passing through a standard cell produces an electric current proportional to the light attenuation. In the field, the same reaction is used on detector sticks compared to a colour chart.

Phosphate concentrations can be plotted on archaeological plans to show former activity areas and are also used to prospect for sites on the broader landscape.

=== Particle Size Analysis ===
The particle size distribution of a soil sample may indicate the conditions under which the strata or sediment were deposited. Particle sizes are generally separated using dry or wet sieving (coarse samples such as till, gravel, and sands, sometimes coarser silts) or by measuring the changes in the density of a dispersed solution (in sodium pyrophosphate, for example) of the sample (finer silts, clays). A rotating clock glass with a very fine-grained dispersed sample under a heat lamp helps separate particles.

The results are plotted as curves that can be analyzed using statistical methods to characterize particle distribution and other parameters.

The fractions received can be further investigated for cultural indicators, macrofossils and microfossils, and other interesting features, so particle size analysis is the first step in handling these samples.

=== Trace element geochemistry ===
Trace element geochemistry studies the abundance of elements in geological materials that do not occur in large amounts. Because these trace element concentrations are determined by many factors that govern the conditions under which a specific geological material is formed, they are usually unique between two locations containing the same type of rock or other geological material.

Geoarchaeologists use this uniqueness in trace element geochemistry to trace ancient patterns of resource acquisition and trade. For example, researchers can examine the trace element composition of obsidian artifacts to "fingerprint" them. They can then study the trace element composition of obsidian outcrops to determine the original source of the raw material used to make the artifact.

=== Clay Mineralogy Analysis ===
Geoarchaeologists study the mineralogical characteristics of pots through macroscopic and microscopic analyses. They can use these characteristics to understand the various manufacturing techniques used to make the pots and, through this, to know which production centers likely made them. They can also use mineralogy to trace the raw materials used to make the pots to specific clay deposits.

=== Ostracod Analysis ===
Naturally occurring Ostracods in freshwater bodies are Affected by changes in salinity and pH due to human activities. Analysis of Ostracod shells in sediment columns reveals changes brought about by farming and habitation activities. This record can be correlated with age-dating techniques to help identify changes in human habitation patterns and population migrations.

== Archaeological geology ==
Archaeological geology is a term coined by Werner Kasig in 1980. It is a subfield of geology that emphasises the value of earth constituents for human life.

== See also ==
- Deposit model
