= Meriel McClatchie =

Archaeobotanist

- Title: Associate Professor

Academic background
- Education: UCL Institute of Archaeology
- Thesis: Arable agriculture and social organisation: a study of crops and farming systems in Bronze Age Ireland (2009)

Academic work
- Discipline: Archaeology
- Sub-discipline: Archaeobotany

Meriel McClatchie is an archaeologist specialising in archaeobotany. She is an associate professor at University College Dublin.

== Education ==
McClatchie studied Archaeology and History at University College Cork, followed by a Masters degree also at University College Cork. McClatchie completed her PhD in 2009 at the Institute of Archaeology, University College London.

== Research ==
McClatchie has worked as a research fellow at Queen's University Belfast, University College Dublin and the University College Cork. In 2016 she was appointed an assistant professor in archaeology at UCD School of Archaeology in 2016, and in 2021 was promoted to an associate professor in 2021.

Her research addresses food, landscape and settlement in Europe, from the prehistoric to the post-medieval period.

== Selected publications ==
- McClatchie, Meriel, et al. 2014. "Neolithic farming in north-western Europe: archaeobotanical evidence from Ireland." Journal of Archaeological Science 51: 206-215.
- McClatchie, Meriel, et al. 2015. "Early medieval farming and food production: A review of the archaeobotanical evidence from archaeological excavations in Ireland." Vegetation History and Archaeobotany 24.1: 179-186.
- McClatchie, M., Bogaard, A., Colledge, S., Whitehouse, N., Schulting, R., Barratt, P., & McLaughlin, T. 2016. Farming and foraging in Neolithic Ireland: An archaeobotanical perspective. Antiquity, 90(350), 302-318. doi:10.15184/aqy.2015.212
