= Molecular vapor deposition =

Molecular vapor deposition is the gas-phase reaction between surface reactive chemicals and an appropriately receptive surface.

Often bi-functional silanes are used in which one termination of the molecule is reactive. For example, a functional chlorosilane (R-Si-Cl_{3}) can react with surface hydroxyl groups (-OH) resulting a radicalized (R) deposition on the surface.

The advantage of a gas phase reaction over a comparable liquid phase process is the control of moisture from the ambient environment, which often results in cross polymerization of the silane leading to particulates on the treated surface. Often a heated sub-atmospheric vacuum chamber is used to allow precise control of the reactants and water content. Additionally the gas phase process allows for easy treatment of complex parts since the coverage of the reactant is generally diffusion limited. Microelectromechanical Systems (MEMS) sensors often use molecular vapor deposition as a technique to address stiction and other parasitic issues relative to surface-to-surface interactions.
