= Electrospark deposition =

Electrospark deposition is a micro-welding manufacturing process typically used to repair damage to precision or valuable mechanical components such as injection moulding tools. This process may also be referred to as "spark hardening", "electrospark toughening" or "electrospark alloying".
