= Deposition (Bellini) =

Painting by Giovanni Bellini in the Gallerie dell'Accademia, Venice

- Lamentation over the Dead Christ
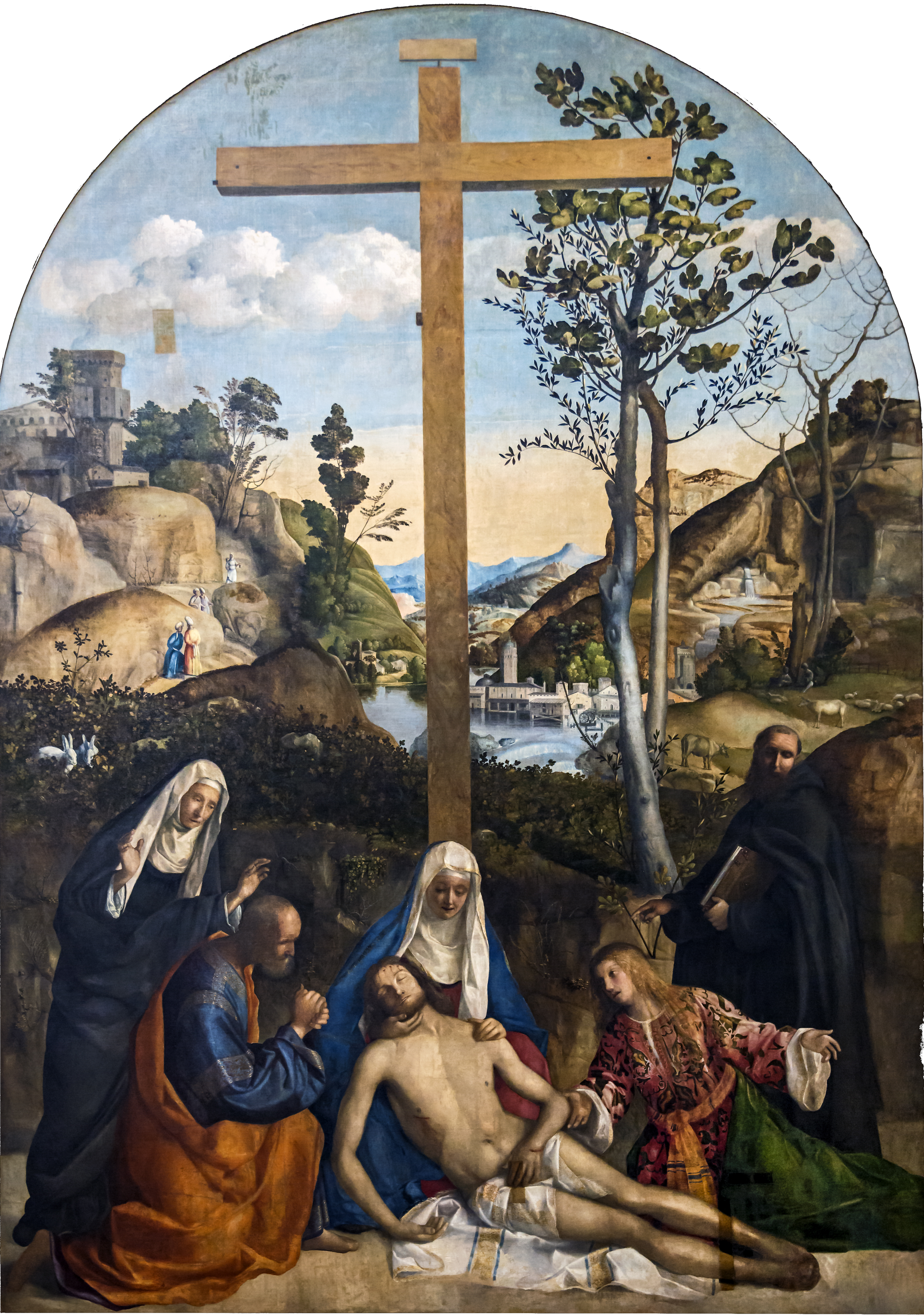
- Artist: Giovanni Bellini
- Year: 1510–16
- Medium: oil on canvas
- Dimensions: 444 cm × 312 cm (175 in × 123 in)
- Location: Gallerie dell'Accademia, Venice
- Website: WGA entry

Deposition or Lamentation over the Dead Christ is a painting by Giovanni Bellini and his workshop, dating to 1510–16 and thus one of his last works. It measures 4.44 m by 3.12 m and is in oils on canvas. It was commissioned for the Santa Maria dei Servi church in Venice, which is now demolished; it is now in the Gallerie dell'Accademia in that city.

== See also ==
- List of works by Giovanni Bellini
