= Hatfield neolithic trackway =

Ancient trackway

The Hatfield Neolithic Trackway (Lindholme Trackway) was discovered in 2004, and is one of the oldest known ancient timber trackways in England. The trackway is the second confirmed archaeological structure from Hatfield and Thorne Moors. The Lindholme Trackway dates to around 2900–2500 BC.

== Context ==
Situated in the Humberhead Levels, Hatfield Moor and Thorne Moor form part of the largest raised peat mire in England. The moors have been drained, improved for agriculture and the peat extracted for fuel and compost since the Bronze Age; however, these processes were continually industrialised from the 17th century until the late 20th century. Hatfield Moor and Thorne Moor are currently undergoing a long term management plan of restoration and conservation.

== Discovery ==
In October 2004 a number of worked wooden poles were discovered by a local man, Mick Oliver, who was walking across the site. The site is sometimes known as the Oliver Track (presumably in comparison to the Sweet Track), or Lindholme Track. Further investigation, including excavation, survey and palaeoenvironmental work, showed that the site was a late neolithic timber trackway, about 45m long, extending from dry land across a shallow pool to a wooden platform.

== Neolithic Period ==
It was during the time the timber trackway was built that the local environment began to change. Previous paleo-environmental studies on the moor indicate peat growth began around 3000BC. The radiocarbon date from the east of the site of 5470-5220 cal. BC is the earliest available on Hatfield Moor for wetland inception and indicated the northern part of Hatfield Moor was one of the earliest foci for peat formation. The site was constructed during a period of environmental transformation, where evidence from the coleopteran analyses demonstrated the site was built at a time of increasingly wet and acidic conditions. Modelling produced by Chapman and Geary (2014) illustrate the trackway was built across and into a pool that marks the earliest known area of wetland development, at the northernmost edge of Lindholme Island. Where evidence also shows the Pinus dominated woodland beginning to die back in places. It is with this evidence along with analysis of the context of the site that the purpose of the structure can begin to be understood.

== Structure ==
The trackway consist of 50m of timber trackway leading north from Lindholme Island. It is the only example where both termini have been excavated allowing the functionality of the site to be exposed. ‘The Hatfield trackway- condition assessment’ acknowledged it was in class 2 decay, and the wood was considered in a state of moderate decay with a preserved inner core but softer decayed outer layers. The assessment demonstrated the wood had lost elasticity and species identification was impossible on a large number of samples indicating the wood had undergone severe decay and biodeteriation resulting in the loss of cellulose and sugar molecules from the cell walls.

The platform and trackway were built of locally available wood, but it is believed that the selection of the wood probably had a deeper resonance with the builders. One recognised material was Birch (Betula) bark which is thought to have been utilised for is whiteness and to have been selected for its visibility amongst the greys and browns of the pool muds. It has also been identified as relating to notions including social cohesion and continuity, unconcealed openness and birth. The design of trackway narrows at the platform edge, providing a specific visual impression from the land edge. This is thought to have created an intentional 'forced perspective' which would have also controlled the movement of its users, allowing several people to walk along the platform at its land edge but enabled single file access to the platform.

The location of the trackway is significant in that it is not situated closer to the drier land. it is situated parallel with the dryland ridge which would have allowed people on dry land to view the activities taking place on the structure. Allowing the interpretation to be made that the structure was in fact used as an arena for performances, entertainment and ceremonies. Although no contemporary parallels can be drawn from other trackways regarding the interpretation of its use comparisons can be made to more modern cultural traditions involving ceremonies and rituals enacted where physically separated by waters around the platforms

== Peat Geochemistry ==
At the time of the condition assessment the soil was recorded to be acidic above and below the track, with high organic content and low levels of nitrate with sulphides, sulphates and sulphur present in low concentrations. The availability of the last three substrates evidenced the conditions around the trackway were reducing meaning immediate action was necessary for the trackways continued preservation.

== Preservation and current condition ==
In situ preservation was recommended for the trackway as a viable management strategy- assuming water levels could be maintained at a level above the timber and the peat saturated throughout. However this brought about new and problematic issues regarding the site's management that had to be overcome by the creation of innovative preservation techniques and policies.

In 2017 the trackway was designated as a Scheduled Ancient Monument by Historic England.

In 2018 the trackway was proposed for inclusion on the heritage at risk register

The Humberhead Peatlands have become a flagship enterprise for peat conservationists as well as for the archaeological assets held within.
