= Deposition (university) =

Former ritual in European universities

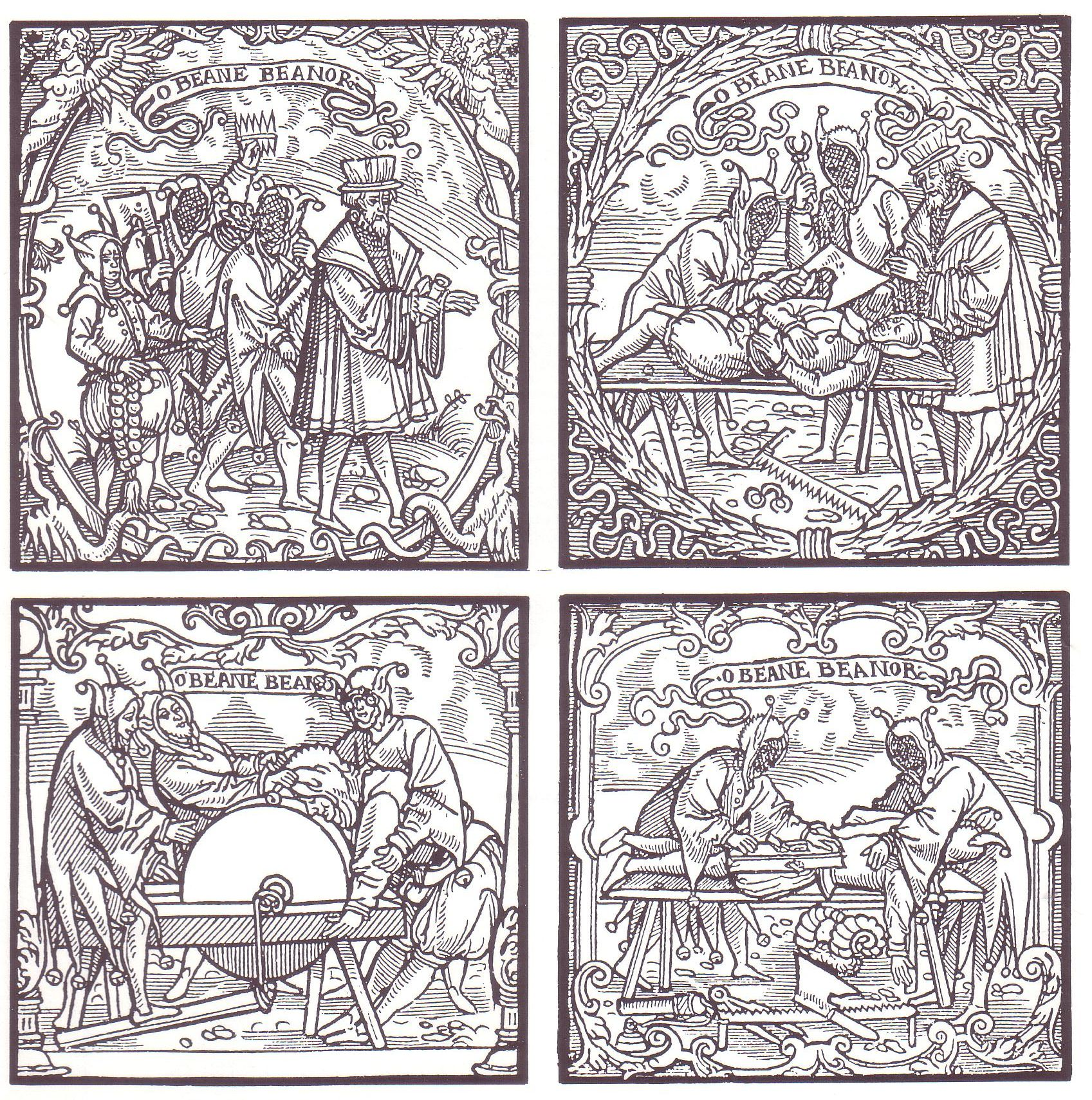
Deposition: Polishing off the horns. Woodcut from the 16th century

The deposition (from Latin depositio cornuum, "taking off the horns") was a semi-official initiation ritual which was common at universities throughout Europe from the Middle Ages until the 18th century. The ritual was introduced at German universities in the late 15th century, probably from the influential University of Paris. Models may have included the Freisprechung ritual in artisan guilds, where apprentices were admitted to the status of journeymen.

== Purpose ==
A basis for the deposition was the idea that the arriving student was still wild and unpolished before their immatriculation – like an animal – and had to be relieved of the signs of their uncivilised state before they could be accepted as part of the university. The student only had to go through the deposition once in their life; they would receive a deposition certificate ("Depositionsschein" in German) which they could need to approve their transfer to another university.

The deposition consisted of scolding, in which the unworthiness of the new student would be clarified to them, in ritualistic removal of animal-like artificial body parts with the help of over-dimensioned tools, as well as beating and other abuse, which would have the function of a purification ritual.

In the speeches at the ritual, models from classical antiquity for the deposition process would be cited. Reference would be made to the examination of the Spartan youth, to the customs of the Academy of Plato, and the water consecration among the Athenian Sophists of Late Antiquity.

== Process ==
The arriving student would in the Middle Ages be known by the term beanus, derived from the French bec jaune, "yellow beak" (cf. English "greenhorn"). The beanus would be treated by his new fellow students as a pecus campi ("animal of the field") and outfitted correspondingly. He would have to don a hood with horns and put the teeth of a boar sticking out of his mouth. He would then have to listen to a speech about his own unworthiness. The animal-like traits would then be knocked off with the help of over-sized tools. The body of the student would be additionally abused, symbolizing the cleansing and beautification. During the process wood-working tools would be used, as the student still was an "uncouth man" (German ungehobelt, unplaned).

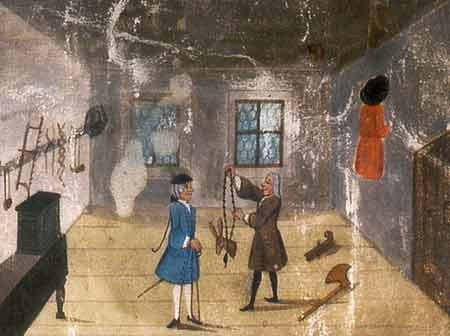
From 1682 onwards, the students would only be shown the deposition instruments (leaf from a Stammbuch from Jena, 1740).

At the University of Leipzig, the tools used in the deposition ritual are still preserved and kept in the art collection. The tools include those used for knocking off or polishing away the animal-like parts (axe, pliers, grindstone), tools for woodworking (plane), and for personal hygiene (shaving brush, shaving cream, shaving knife, ear spoon). Injuries to new students were common with the use of these tools.

After this, examinations would be carried out, and additional speeches of admonition would be held. Finally, the leader of the ritual would put salt in the mouth of the beanus (sal sapientiae, "salt of wisdom"), pour wine over his head (vinum laetitiae, "wine of joy") and declare him free of his "beanism".

After the payment of the relevant fee, an entrance examination would follow, carried out by a professor, and the matriculation by the rector of the university.

Normally a party would be held at the expense of the newly matriculated student or students, which would obviously be a significant burden for them. This custom was maintained even after the deposition had been abolished and would often be used excessively, leading to the prohibition of forcing the new students to participate in these parties.

== Duties and responsibilities ==
In the Middle Ages, the deposition was led by the Rector, as the students in question would live and study under monastery-like circumstances.

In the Early Modern period, as the schools lost their ecclesiastical character and their finances were reduced, the Dean of the Faculty of Arts (later called the Faculty of Philosophy) would take over the task. In this faculty, the basic scholarly concepts (septem artes liberales) were taught. The teachers and the Dean were, as a rule, students in the "higher" faculties of medicine, theology or law. It was during the Early Modern period that the custom of deposition slowly deteriorated into a farce. The position of depositor was taken over by the "pedell"; at the end of the 17th century, he would still demonstrate the tools and make out the deposition certificate for a fee.

In the 18th century, the responsibilities and duties of the depositor were still included in the statutes of a university determined by the ruler of the country. There were also detailed prescriptions on how to keep the tools.

The last known depositor at the University of Marburg was the pedell Johannes Georg Schimmelpfeng (1697–1785). In Jena, the deposition was abolished after the death of the last depositor in 1785. At the University of Leipzig, the deposition was prohibited by 1719, because of the excesses of the students.

== Book printers ==
In the late Middle Ages, the new craft of book printing would be established in the vicinity of universities, and the printers – who, at the time, had no old traditions of their own – would borrow the custom of deposition. The deposition of book printers was abolished in 1803 because of the excesses. A reminder of it still exists in the custom of Gautschen.

== See also ==
- Hazing
