= Deposit model =

In the field of archaeology a deposit model is a method of identifying the character and degree of survival of buried archaeological remains over a specified area without necessarily excavating the whole area.

Following the introduction of archaeology into the planning process in most western nations, the importance of gathering as much information as possible on a site without digging it up has grown. Such information can be used to inform the decisions made by planners, developers and archaeologists about the necessity for, and nature of, any archaeological work in advance of new building.

A deposit model uses the results of previous excavations and other intrusive archaeological investigations to estimate the nature of the archaeology over a wider area. Productive excavations in one area would suggest that land nearby would also be productive. Since the buried archaeological record is essentially a volume of earth trapped between the two archaeological horizons defined by the underlying natural geology and the horizon of modern intrusions projecting down into the record, the detailed mapping of the underlying geology of an area has become important in deposit modeling and has resulted in a growth of work for geoarchaeologists. The results of surveying can be extrapolated between known geographical points and used to estimate the impact of certain types of development.

By taking into account known disturbances to the ground certain areas can be presumed to have limited archaeological potential. A survey of buildings identifying which have basements in them for example may suggest that certain streets have had all their archaeology removed (or truncated) in the past.

Where buildings stand on top of probable or known archaeology the effect that their foundations and floors have on ground water levels may also be important in the degree of preservation that can be expected.

All this information can be stored on a computer GIS database and analysed and augmented as time goes by and further information is revealed.

An early deposit model of the city of York was produced in the early 1990s and has been used to inform archaeological decisions in the city since.

== See also ==
- Geoarchaeology
