= The Lamentation of Christ by circle of Rubens (Alte Pinakothek) =

Painting by circle of Peter Paul Rubens

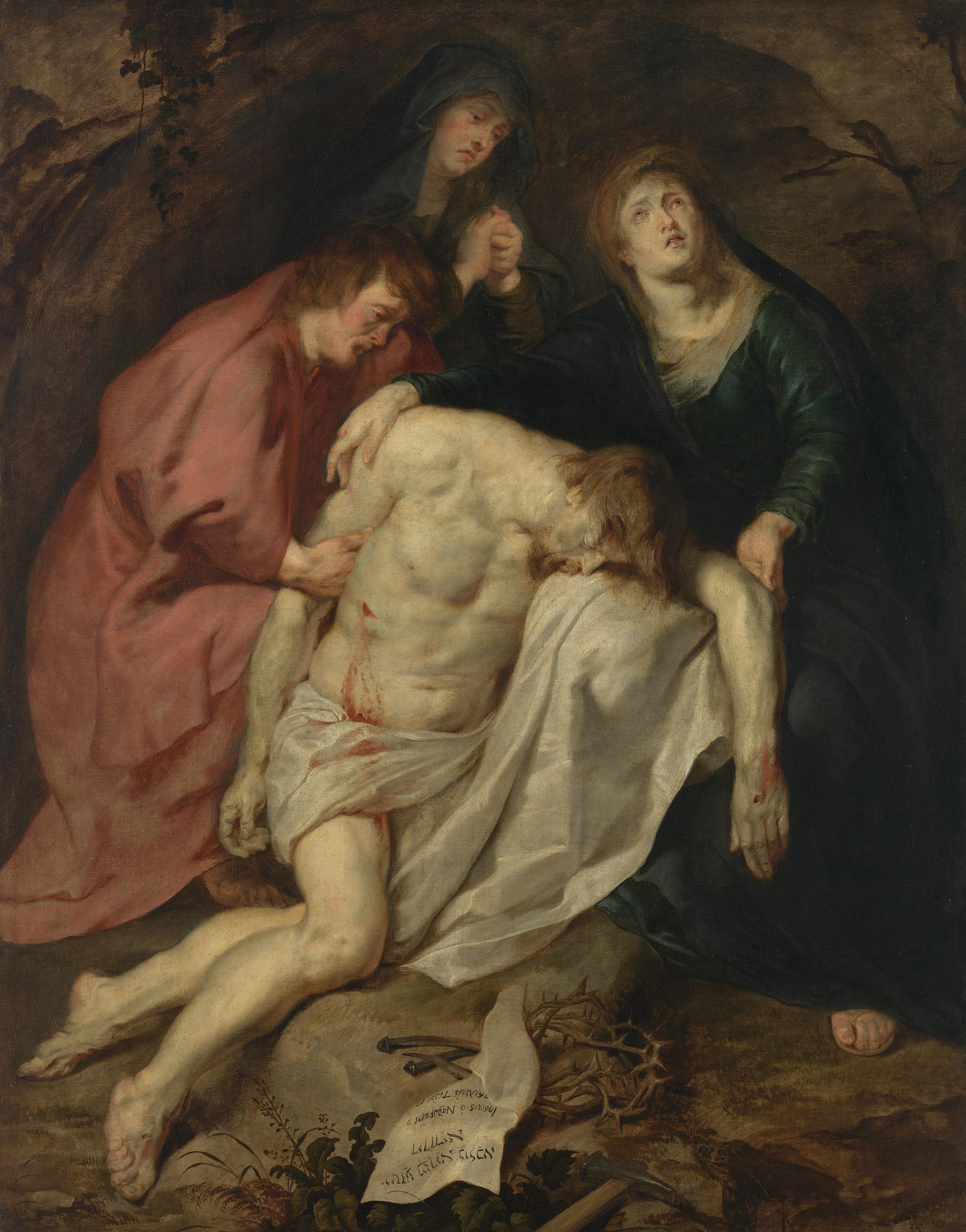
The Lamentation of Christ

The Lamentation of Christ is a painting ascribed to the circle of the Flemish artist Peter Paul Rubens and dated to around 1620. It is held in the collection of the Alte Pinakothek in Munich.
