= Anthracology =

Study of preserved charcoal remains

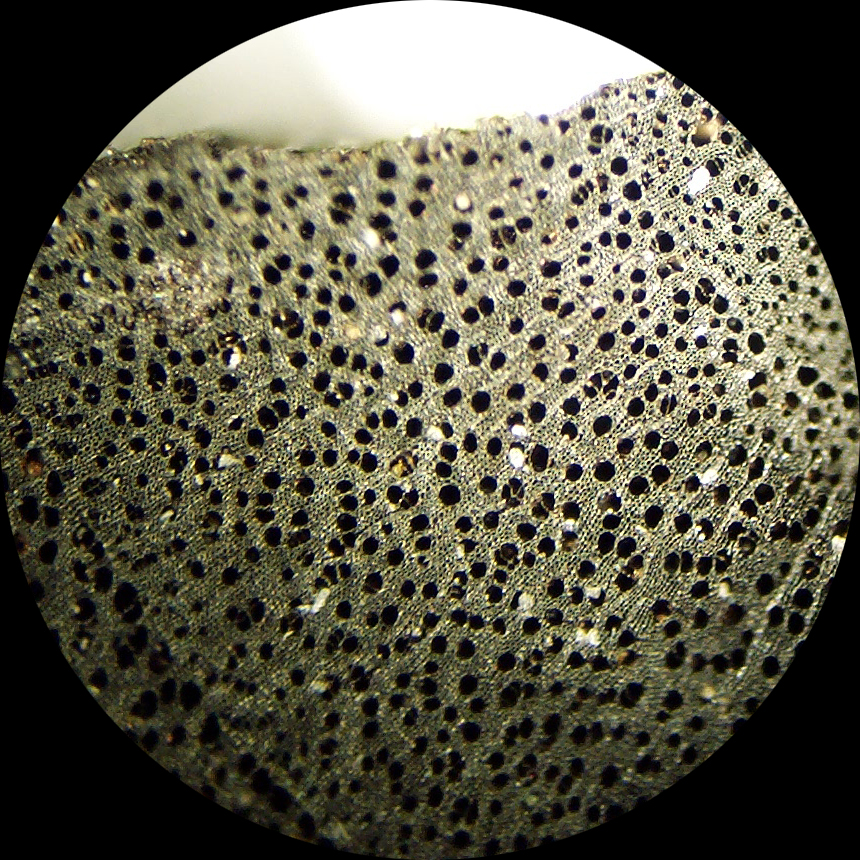
Microscopic view of charcoal particles during an anthracological study.

Anthracology (from anthrax (ἄνθραξ), the Greek word for coal) is the analysis and identification of charcoal which is preserved after carbonization, based on wood anatomy. The remains of carbonized wood come from archaeological sites and sediments, and may yield evidence of natural or anthropogenic paleo-fires. Anthracological studies are also applied to extant material, such as the inspection of charcoal of illegal provenance. The discipline was started in Brazil by Rita Scheel-Ybert in the late 1990s, but the identification of species from carbonized wood dates from the end of the 19th century. The working methods back then (based on the preparation of thin sections) were difficult and time-consuming, and research did not have a paleo-environmental approach. From the 1970s on, the use of reflected light microscopes, mainly from France by Professor Jean-Louis Vernet, allowed the multiplication of anthracological analysis, prompting the appearance of paleo-ecological studies. Anthracological analyses in Southern Brazil and in the Central Amazon have extended the knowledge of early settlements, their environmental resources and fuel economy, and the use of wood in ritual contexts. The conservation of carbonized fruits, seeds, roots and tubers has furthered the knowledge of diet and food production issues.

== Background ==
Anthracology is a method of study for Archaeology. Archaeological sediments are usually very rich in charcoal fragments, which identification provides interpretations on the landscape, paleovegetation, relations between humans and their environment, and plants use by ancient populations. Besides the paleoenvironmental perspective that allows the reconstitution of past plant formations and, therefore, of the paleoclimate, this discipline offers important palaeoethnobotanical information regarding the utilization of wood in everyday basis and also in rituals, including also the subsistence of ancient populations, by means of conservation of carbonized dietary remains.

The anthracological analysis of archaeological charcoal is already largely acknowledged as a reliable tool for palaeoenvironmental reconstruction. The development of this discipline, in Brazil, has been marked by a strong preoccupation with the definition of appropriate methodologies, seeking both palaeoenvironmental and palaeoethnobotanical information that are committed to archaeological issues.

Anthracological analyses in sambaquis and Tupi-Guarani sites on Southern and Southeastern Brazil, as well as in ceramic sites in Central Amazon, have been essential to broaden our knowledge about the landscape in the areas where such settlements were established, the environmental resources, site catchment area, fuel economy, and use of wood in quotidian and ritual contexts. More recently, anthracological analysis has proven itself an important tool to support archaeological interpretation, helping to elucidate site formation processes and providing more consistent information on the site's functional aspects.

Besides that, the conservation of carbonized fruits, seeds, and underground organs remains (roots and tubers) have enabled the approaching of diet and food production issues.

== Anthracology and dendrology ==
Dendrology studies associated to anthracological analyses make possible to estimate the minimum diameter of charred woods on the basis of the angulation of the rays. The first studies on this research line took place on the Black Forest, in Germany, where it was possible to recognize the effect of anthropical activities on the forest structure and composition (Ludemann, 2002, 2008; Ludemann & Nelle, 2002; Ludemann et al., 2004; Nelle, 2002).

== Geoanthracology ==
The study of charcoal of sedimentary origin (soils, paleosoils or sedimentary deposit) provides essentially palaeoenvironmental information, allowing the reconstitution of previous vegetation and palaeoclimate. Important information on the relations between past vegetation, forest fires, and climate changes are being obtained from several studies performed in Europe and North America.

In Brazil, anthracological analyses coupled with the study of the isotopic composition of the soil at the state of São Paulo made possible to establish that the climate of that region was drier during the beginning of the Holocene and moister right after that period, as it is nowadays, from ca. 3000 years BP (Scheel-Ybert et al., 2003).

== Legal control of charcoal production ==
Anthracological studies may also be used for conservationist and technological approaches, as in detecting species of illegal provenience and determining charcoal quality. The use of Anthracology in Brazil as a tool to identify and, therefore, inspect and control charcoal production has important conservationist character since the country is the world's main charcoal producer. Although such charcoal (which is mainly destined for the steel industry) may be regarded as renewable energy, its environmental impact is actually strong, since a huge part of it is the result of illegal extraction from native forests.
