= Magnetic survey (archaeology) =

Magnetic detection of archaeological artefacts and features

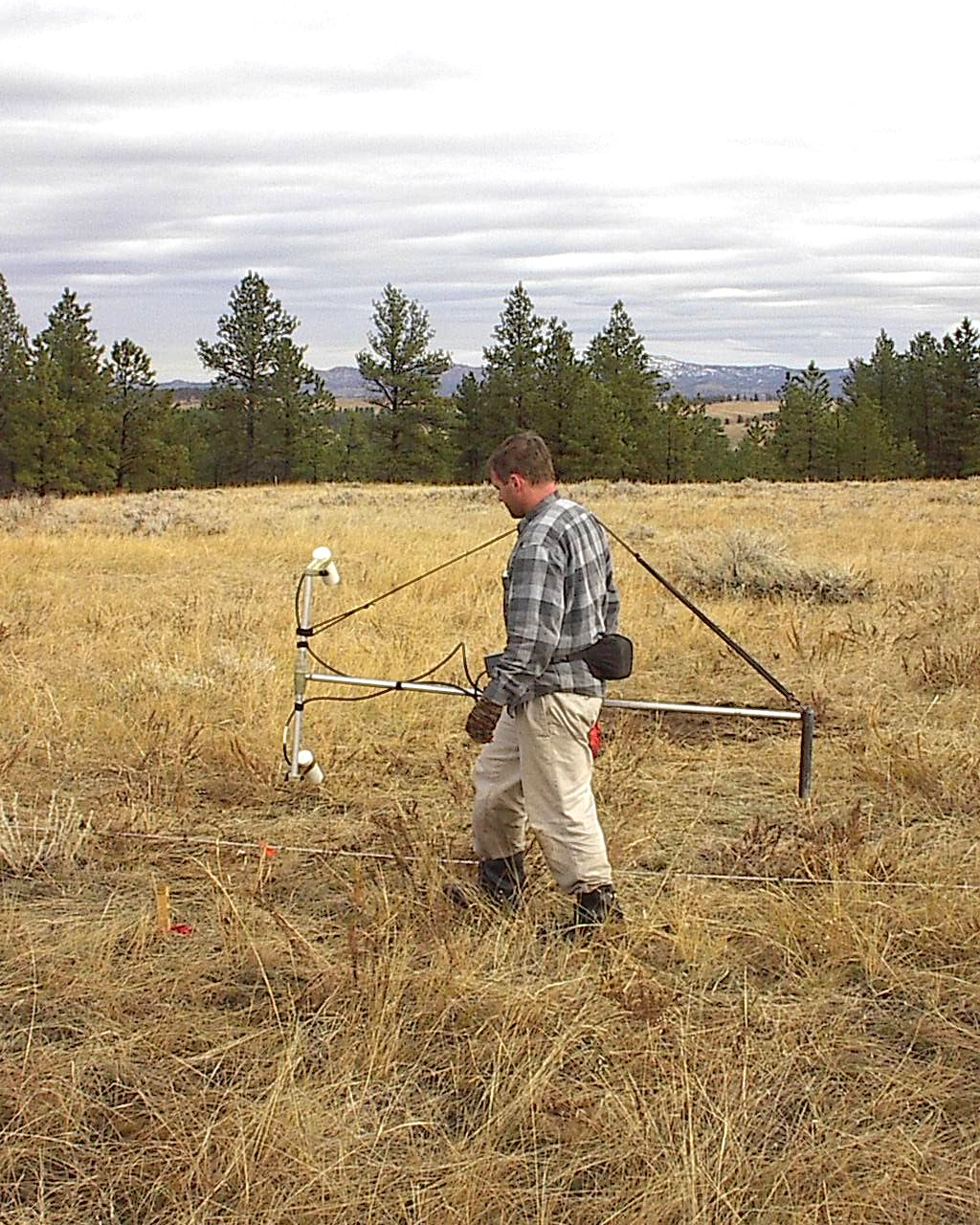
Magnetic survey of an archaeological site

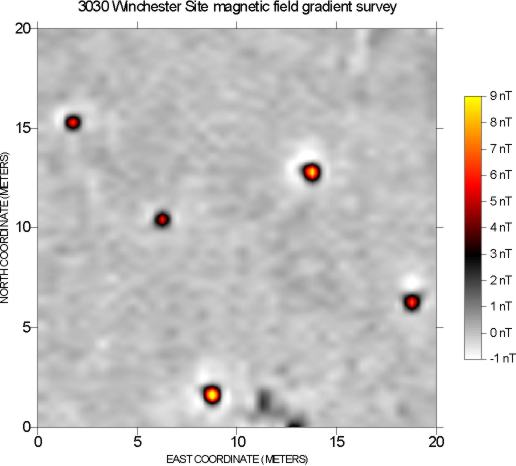
Magnetic gradiometer map of Prehistoric fire-hearths

A magnetic survey at Pembroke Castle carried out by Dyfed Archaeological Trust and funded by the Castle Studies Trust

Magnetic surveying is one of a number of methods used in archaeological geophysics. Magnetic surveys record spatial variation in the Earth's magnetic field. In archaeology, magnetic surveys are used to detect and map archaeological artefacts and features. Magnetic surveys are used in both terrestrial and marine archaeology.

== Overview ==
Magnetometers used in geophysical survey may use a single sensor to measure the total magnetic field strength, or may use two (sometimes more) spatially separated sensors to measure the gradient of the magnetic field (the difference between the sensors). In most archaeological applications the latter (gradiometer) configuration is preferred because it provides better resolution of small, near-surface phenomena. Magnetometers may also use a variety of different sensor types. Proton precession magnetometers have largely been superseded by faster and more sensitive fluxgate and cesium instruments.

Every kind of material has unique magnetic properties, even those that we do not think of as being "magnetic". Different materials below the ground can cause local disturbances in the Earth's magnetic field that are detectable with sensitive magnetometers. The chief limitation of magnetometer survey is that subtle features of interest may be obscured by highly magnetic geologic or modern materials.

Magnetometry largely relies on the fact that the topsoil has a higher magnetic susceptibility than most bedrocks or subsoils. This is because of the concentration of iron minerals in the topsoil, often weathered from the bedrock. Environmental processes such as repeated vegetation fires and redox reactions caused by wetting and drying of the soil convert iron compounds to oxide maghemite (y-Fe_{2}O_{3}). Associated anthropogenic activities such as lighting fires or irrigated farming accentuate this effect.

Magnetometry is therefore useful for finding pits and ditches which have been backfilled with topsoil, with a higher magnetic susceptibility than the surroundings. Roads and structures are also visible from magnetic surveys since they can be detected because the susceptibility of the subsoil material used in their construction is lower than the surrounding topsoil.

== Terrestrial magnetic surveys ==
In terrestrial archaeology, magnetic surveys are typically used for detailed mapping of archaeological features on known archaeological sites. More exceptionally, magnetometers are used for low-resolution exploratory surveys.

Several types of magnetometer are used in terrestrial archaeology. Early surveys, beginning in the 1950s, were conducted with proton precession magnetometers. Data collection with proton precession instruments was slow, making high sample density surveys impracticable. Data were manually recorded and plotted. The subsequent introduction of Fluxgate and cesium vapor magnetometers improved sensitivity, and greatly increased sampling speed, making high resolution surveys of large areas practical. Equally important was the development of computers to handle, process, and display large datasets.

Magnetometers react very strongly to iron and steel, brick, burned soil, and many types of rock, and archaeological features composed of these materials are very detectable. Where these highly magnetic materials do not occur, it is often possible to detect very subtle anomalies caused by disturbed soils or decayed organic materials. Many types of sites and features have been successfully mapped with magnetometers, ranging from very ephemeral prehistoric campsites to large urban centers.

Magnetic survey help to prove that a survey area has the potential for more detailed studies and scientific excavation.

== Marine magnetic surveys ==
Magnetic surveys are extremely useful in the excavation and exploration of underwater archaeological sites. The apparatus used on the water slightly differs from that on land. Marine magnetometers come in two types: surface-towed and near-bottom. Both are towed a sufficient distance (about two ship lengths) away from the ship to allow them to collect data without being affected by the ship's magnetic properties. Surface-towed magnetometers allow for a wider range of detection but have lower precision than near-bottom magnetometers.

The most common type of magnetometer used for marine surveying is the fluxgate magnetometer. Fluxgate magnetometers utilize two ferromagnetic cores each wound with a primary coil (in opposite directions) and an outer secondary coil attached to an amp meter. When an alternating current (AC) is passed through the primary coils, it creates two opposing magnetic fields that vary in intensity based on the outside magnetic fields. By floating them parallel to the seafloor, they can measure the changes in magnetic fields over the seabed.

Another common type is the newer proton precession magnetometer. This utilizes a container full of hydrogen-rich liquids (commonly kerosene or methanol) that, when agitated by a direct current (DC) or Radio Frequency (RF), cause the electrons to become energized and transfer that energy to the protons due to the Overhauser Effect, basically turning them into dipole magnets. When the stimulus is removed, the protons precess at a rate that can be interpreted to determine the magnetic forces of the area.

In maritime archaeology, these are often used to map the geology of wreck sites and determine the composition of magnetic materials found on the seafloor. An Overhauser magnetometer (PPM) was used in 2001 to map Sebastos (the harbor of Caesarea Maritima) and helped to identify components of the Roman concrete.

== Airborne magnetic surveys ==
Measuring the Earths' magnetic field is a very useful tool in mineral exploration, oil exploration, and geological mapping. To cover large areas with uniform data, aircraft such as helicopters, airplanes, and drones are employed. The amount of detail is a function of flight height and sample density, in addition to instrument sensitivity. For surveys, drones are used which helps greatly in the process.

== Related methods ==
The magnetic properties of archaeological materials form the basis for a number of other archaeological techniques, Including:

- Magnetic susceptibility survey
- Laboratory analysis of magnetic samples
- Archaeomagnetic dating
