= Portrait of Thomas Arnold =

Painting by Henry Thomas Phillips

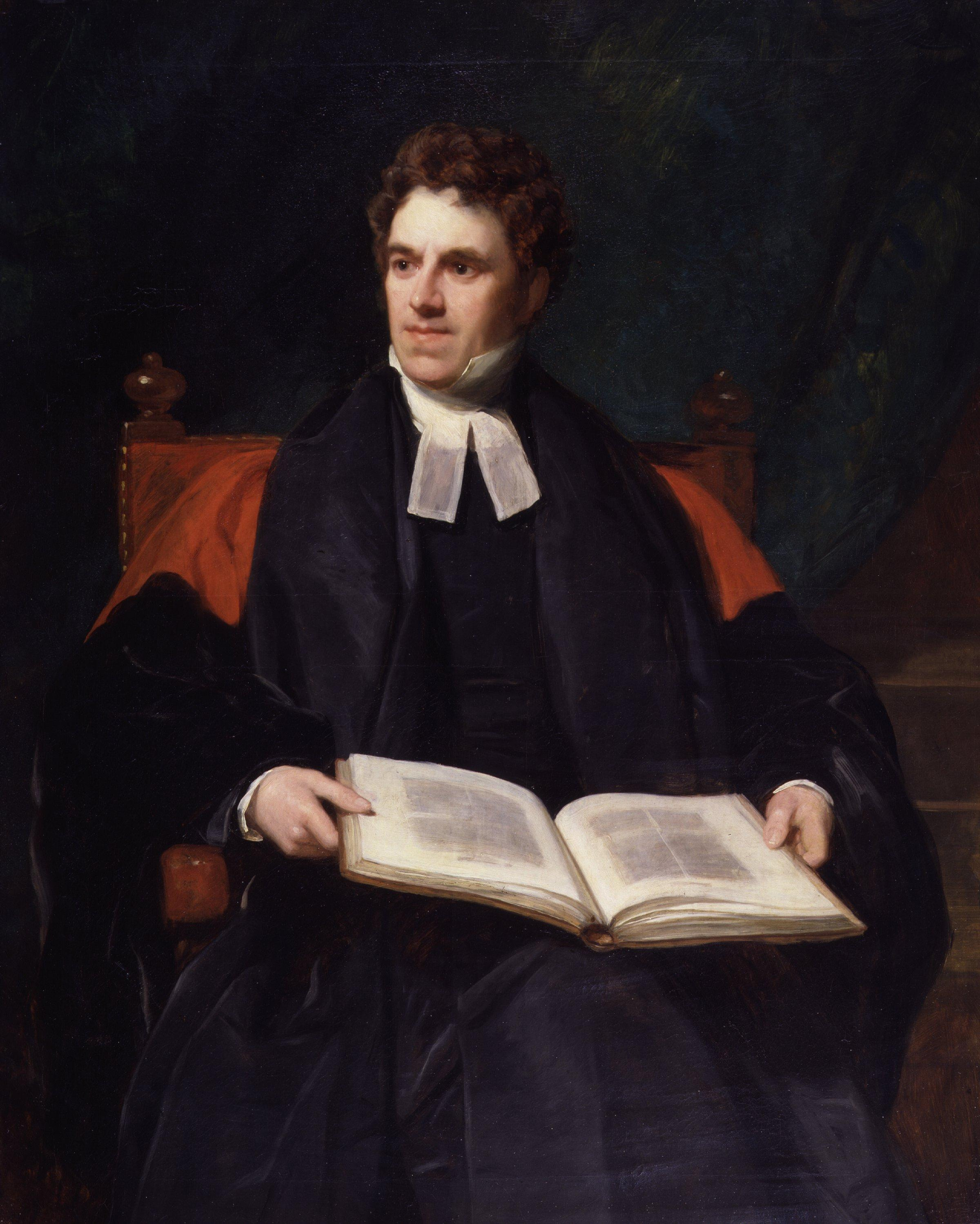
- Artist: Thomas Phillips
- Year: 1839
- Type: Oil on canvas, portrait painting
- Dimensions: 121.9 cm × 99.1 cm (48.0 in × 39.0 in)
- Location: National Portrait Gallery, London

Portrait of Thomas Arnold is an oil on canvas portrait painting by the British artist Thomas Phillips, from 1839.

== History and description ==
It depicts the British historian and educator Thomas Arnold who served as headmaster of Rugby School from 1828 and 1841. Arnold was featured in the novel Tom Brown's Schooldays by Thomas Hughes, who had attended Rugby during his leadership. He is shown dressed in academic robes with an open book in front of him. He looks to the left side. Phillips, a contemporary and rival of Thomas Lawrence, had emerged as one of the leading portraitists of the Regency era.

The painting was displayed at the Royal Academy Exhibition of 1839 at the National Gallery in London. In 1923 it was acquired by the National Portrait Gallery. Replicas are in Oriel College and Rugby School, while an engraving was produced in 1840 produced on the original.

== Bibliography ==
- Copley, Terence (2002). Black Tom: Arnold of Rugby: The Myth and the Man. Bloomsbury Academic. ISBN 978-0-8264-5723-3.
- Ormond, Richard (1974). Early Victorian Portraits. ISBN 0-11-290093-3.
