= Robin Hood and His Merry Men Entertaining Richard the Lionheart in Sherwood Forest =

Painting by Daniel Maclise

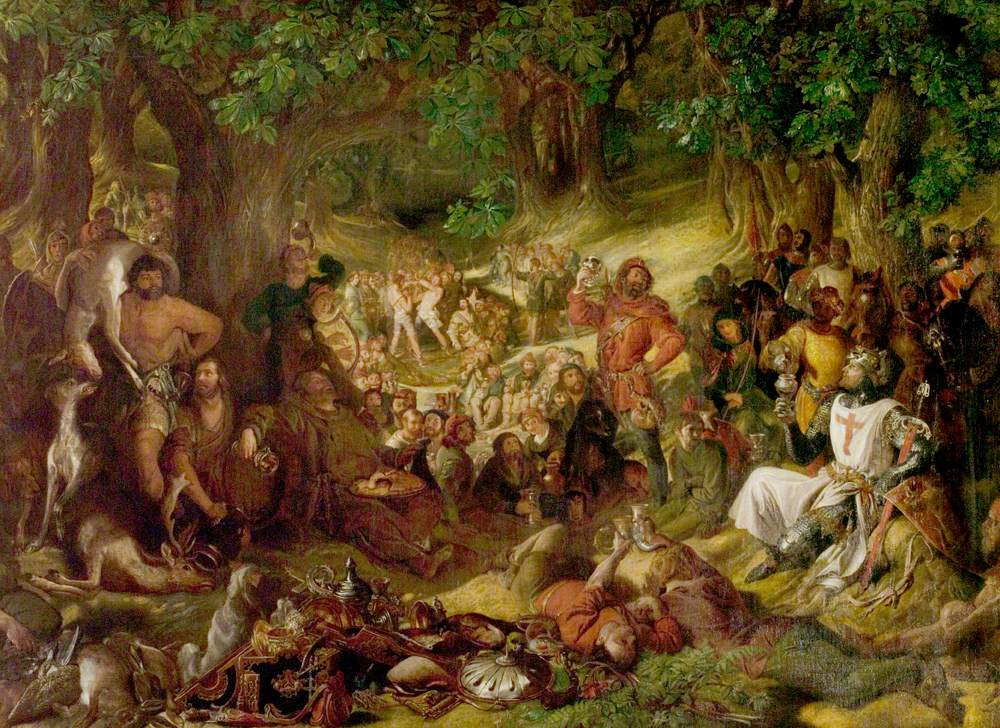
- Artist: Daniel Maclise
- Year: 1839
- Type: Oil on canvas, history painting
- Dimensions: 111 cm × 155 cm (44 in × 61 in)
- Location: Nottingham Castle, Nottingham

Robin Hood and His Merry Men Entertaining Richard the Lionheart in Sherwood Forest is an 1839 history painting by the Irish artist Daniel Maclise, reflecting the style of the Romantic movement. It shows the former outlaw Robin Hood and his band of Merry Men hosting the rightful king Richard I at his hideout in Sherwood Forest. The king and his entourage are dressed as crusaders, having recently returned from fighting in the Holy Land. Behind them the festivities are in full swing with an archery completion taking place. Little John is on the left, carrying a hunted animal across his shoulders. Nearby Friar Tuck has slumped sleepily against a tree, with a large pie in front of him.

The painting was based on a scene from the 1819 novel Ivanhoe by the Scottish writer Walter Scott. It was displayed at the Royal Academy Exhibition of 1839 at the National Gallery in London. Today the work is in the collection of Nottingham Castle, having been acquired in 1984.

== Bibliography ==
- DeGategno, Paul. Ivanhoe: The Mask of Chivalry. Twayne, 1994
- Gordon, Catherine May. British Paintings of Subjects from the English Novel, 1740-1870. Garland, 1988.
- Murray, Peter. Daniel Maclise, 1806-1870: Romancing the Past. Crawford Art Gallery, 2008.
- Weston, Nancy. Daniel Maclise: Irish Artist in Victorian London. Four Courts Press, 2009.
