= Grace Before Meat =

Painting by David Wilkie

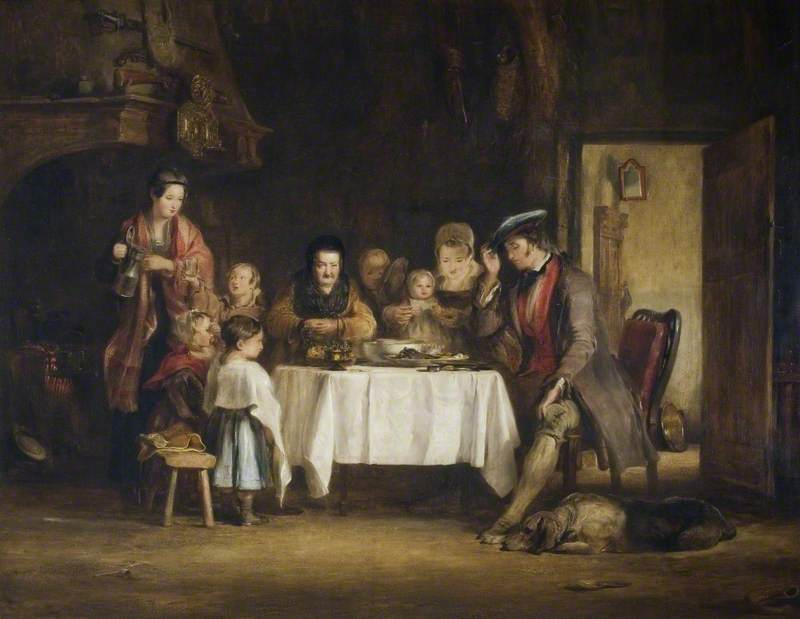
- Artist: David Wilkie
- Year: 1839
- Type: Oil on canvas, genre painting
- Dimensions: 101 cm × 127 cm (40 in × 50 in)
- Location: Birmingham Art Gallery, Birmingham

Grace Before Meat is an 1839 oil painting by that British artist David Wilkie. A genre painting, it depicting a family sitting down to dinner and saying Grace before they eat. It has an overtly simple theme and composition. Emphasising Wilkie's international reputation, the painting was commissioned by Glendy Burk of New Orleans.

The picture drew on the trading of painting by Rembrandt and other artists of the Dutch Golden Age. It marked a return to the style of his early career when he had produced modest scenes of everyday life inspired by Dutch Old Masters. It is often consider a companion piece to Wilkie's The Cotter's Saturday Night. although they are not formal pendant paintings. The picture was displayed at the Royal Academy Exhibition of 1839 held at the National Gallery in London. It is now in the collection of Birmingham Art Gallery, which acquired it in 1954.

A preparatory watercolour picture is in the collection of the Yale Center for British Art in Connecticut.

== Bibliography ==
- Herrmann, Luke. Nineteenth Century British Painting. Charles de la Mare, 2000
- Tromans, Nicholas. David Wilkie: The People's Painter. Edinburgh University Press, 2007.
