= Football (painting) =

Painting by Thomas Webster

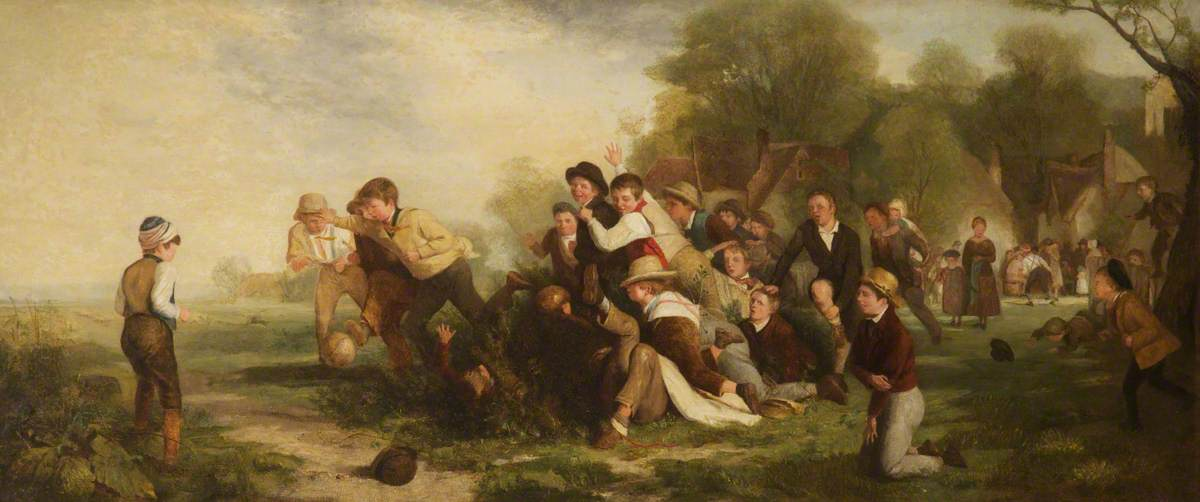
- Artist: Thomas Webster
- Year: 1839
- Type: Oil on panel, genre painting
- Dimensions: 63 cm × 150 cm (25 in × 59 in)
- Location: National Football Museum, Manchester

Football or The Football Game is an 1839 oil painting by the British artist Thomas Webster. A genre painting, it show a group of boys in an English village playing with a ball. It was painted at a time when modern rules of what became association football were rapidly emerging from the traditional game. The sport was formally codified in 1863 by the Football Association.

Webster was celebrated for his scenes of everyday life, capturing the late Regency and Victorian era. Elected a member of the Royal Academy in 1846 he was subsequently a key influence and a member of the Cranbrook Colony of artists who enjoyed success with such scenes that updated the traditional Seventeenth Century style of Dutch Old Masters to the contemporary period.

This painting was displayed at the Royal Academy Exhibition of 1839 held at the National Gallery in London where it was acquired by the art collector Robert Vernon for 200 guineas. Today it is in the collection of the National Football Museum in Manchester.

== Bibliography ==
- Brown, Paul. The Victorian Football Miscellany. Superelastic, 2013.
- Sandle, Doug & Long, Jonathan. Interrelationships Between Sport and the Arts. Taylor & Francis, 2022.
- Thompson, Carol (ed.) The Cranbrook Colony: Fresh Perspectives. Wolverhampton Art Gallery, 2010.
- Wingfield, Marry Ann. Sport and the Artist: Ball Games. Antique Collectors' Club, 1988.
