= Christ Blessing Little Children (Eastlake) =

Painting by Charles Lock Eastlake

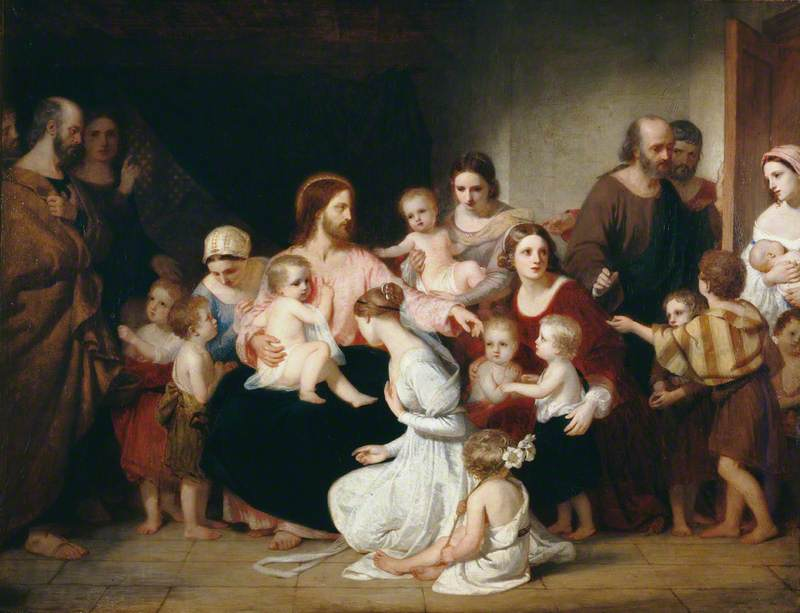
- Artist: Charles Lock Eastlake
- Year: 1839
- Type: Oil on canvas, religious painting
- Dimensions: 79 cm × 103.2 cm (31 in × 40.6 in)
- Location: Manchester Art Gallery, Manchester

Christ Blessing Little Children is an 1839 religious oil painting by the British artist Charles Lock Eastlake. It depicts Jesus surrounded by mothers and their young children, who stylistically resemble the works of Raphael.

Eastlake spent many years living in Rome and was strongly influenced by traditional Italian art. It was displayed at the Royal Academy Exhibition of 1839 at the National Gallery in London. It won widespread praises from critics and the public. The painting is now in the collection of the Manchester Art Gallery having been acquired in 1886.

In 1847 the engraver James Henry Watt produced a popular print based on the painting, a copy of which is now in the Victoria and Albert Museum.

== Bibliography ==
- Giebelhausen, Michaela. Painting the Bible: Representation and Belief in Mid-Victorian Britain. Taylor & Francis, 2017.
- Monkhouse, Cosmo. Pictures by Sir Charles Eastlake. Virtue, Spalding, 1876.
