= Royal Academy Exhibition of 1839 =

1839 art exhibition in London

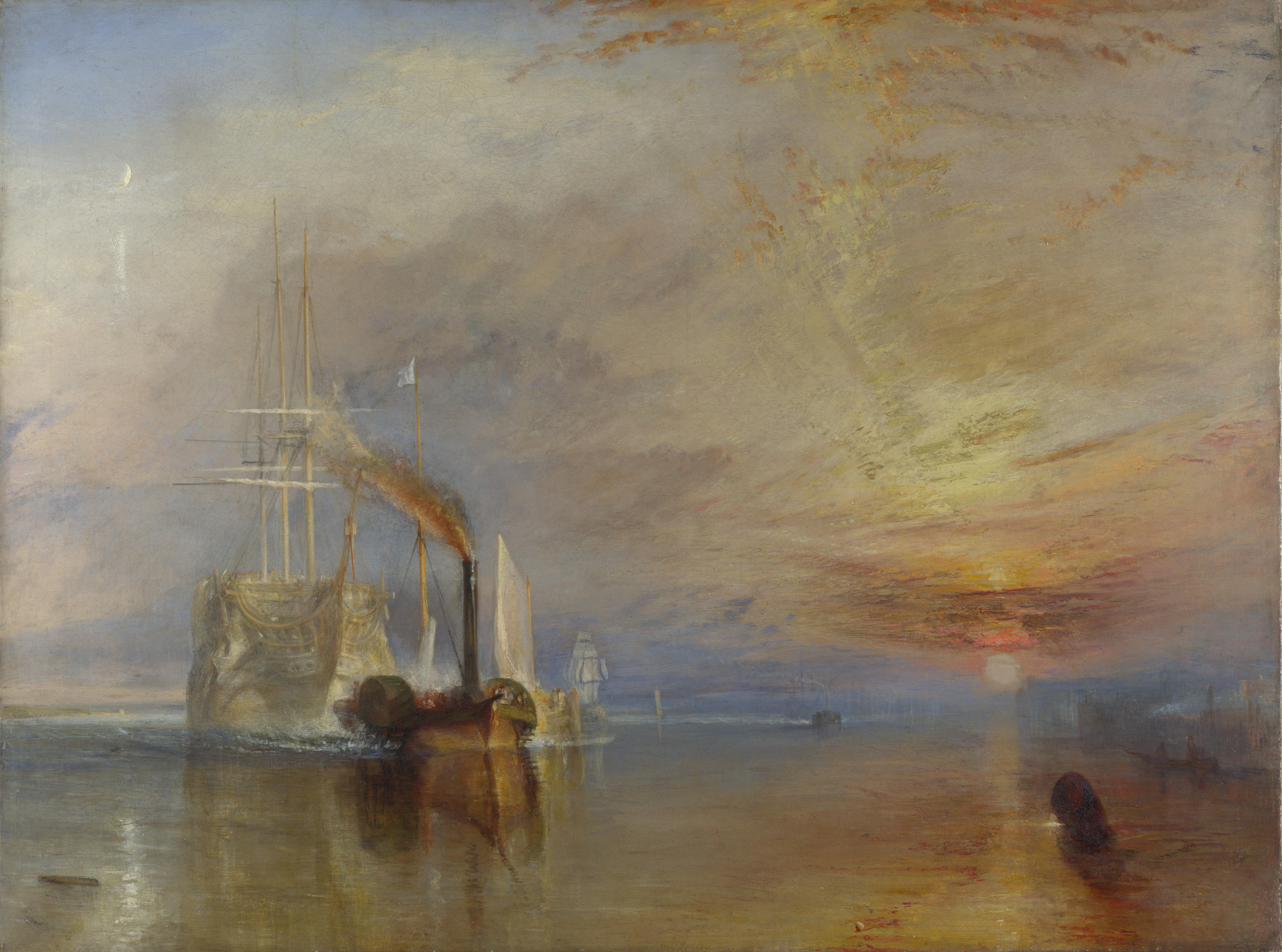
The Fighting Temeraire by J.M.W. Turner

The Royal Academy Exhibition of 1839 was the seventy first Summer Exhibition of the British Royal Academy of Arts. It was held at the National Gallery in London from 6 May to 27 July 1839. It featured submissions from leading painters, sculptors and architects of the early Victorian era.

J.M.W. Turner sent in a number of paintings, each of which met with a degree of critical hostility. The best known of these works was The Fighting Temeraire, featuring a celebrated Napoleonic War battleship being towed up the River Thames to be broken up. The others include included the companion pieces Ancient Rome - Agrippina Landing with the Ashes of Germanicus and Modern Rome – Campo Vaccino both landscapes featuring views of the city Rome. He also displayed a third Roman-themed work Cicero at His Villa at Tusculum as well as The Rape of Proserpine based on Greek Mythology. Edwin Landseer debuted a number of paintings, reflecting his speciality in animal painting.

David Wilkie displayed the history painting Sir David Baird Discovering the Body of Sultan Tipoo Sahib, which was one of the most popular works in the exhibition. Wilkie also displayed a simpler genre subject Grace Before Meat. The Irish artist Daniel Maclise enjoyed success with his Robin Hood and His Merry Men Entertaining Richard the Lionheart in Sherwood Forest, illustrating a scene from Walter Scott's novel Ivanhoe. Marshall Claxton submitted Lady Jane Grey in the Tower featuring a scene from the Tudor era while Solomon Hart displayed Lady Jane Grey at Her Place of Execution. Charles Landseer, the brother of Edwin, presented The Pillaging of a Jews House in the Reign of Richard I depicting medieval antisemitism.

In portraiture the President of the Royal Academy Martin Archer Shee displayed a depiction of the future Prime Minister Lord Aberdeen. His rival Thomas Phillips featured several portraits including Thomas Arnold and the art collector Lord Egremont. Francis Grant, rapidly establishing himself as one of the leading portrait painters of the early Victorian era, enjoyed success with his sporting painting The Melton Hunt Going to Draw the Ram's Head Cover which was bought by the Duke of Wellington for a large price. Amongst the many sculptures on display was Edward Hodges Baily's marble statue of the engineer Thomas Telford, designed for Westminster Abbey.

== Gallery ==
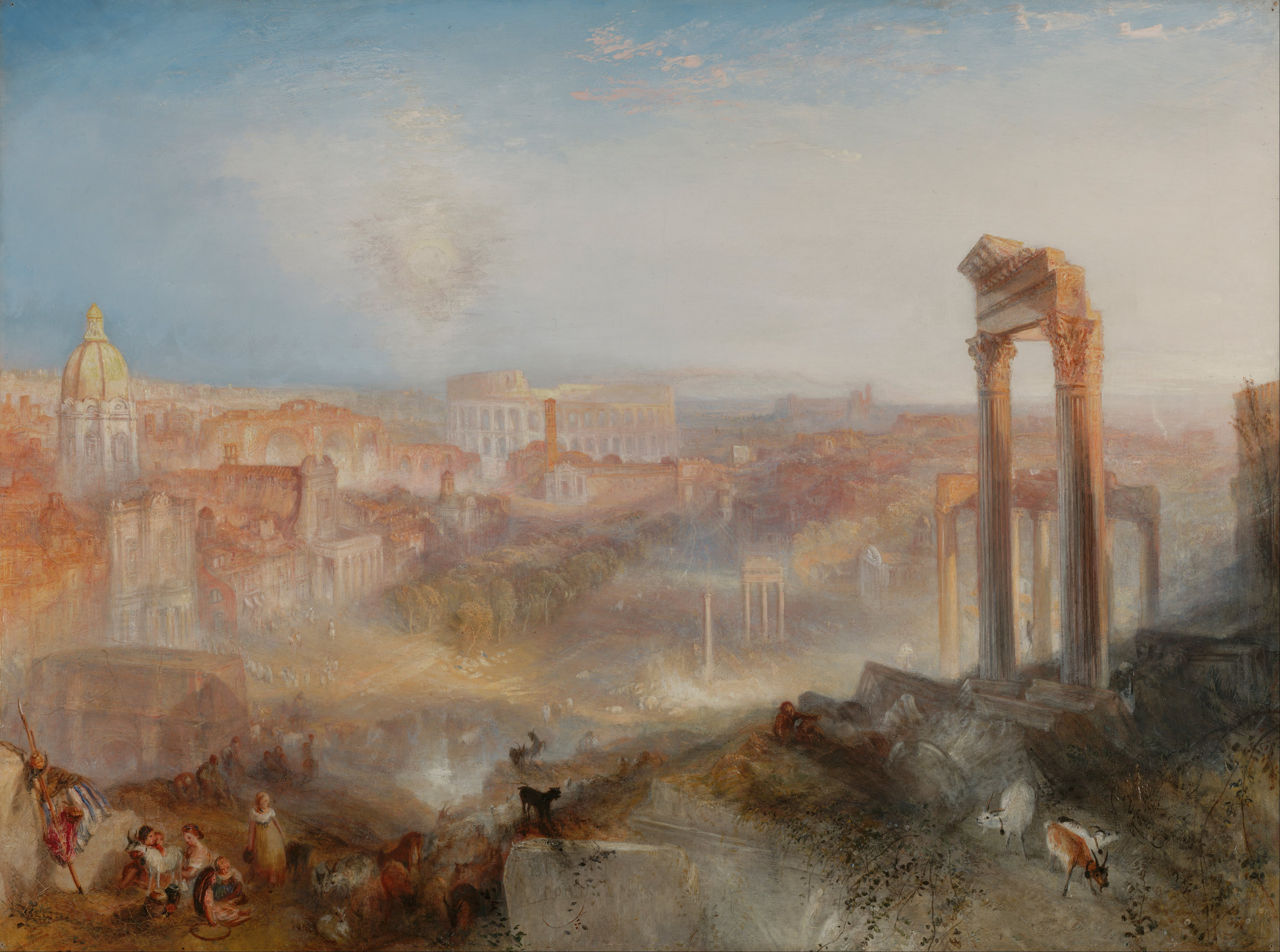
Modern Rome – Campo Vaccino by J.M.W. Turner

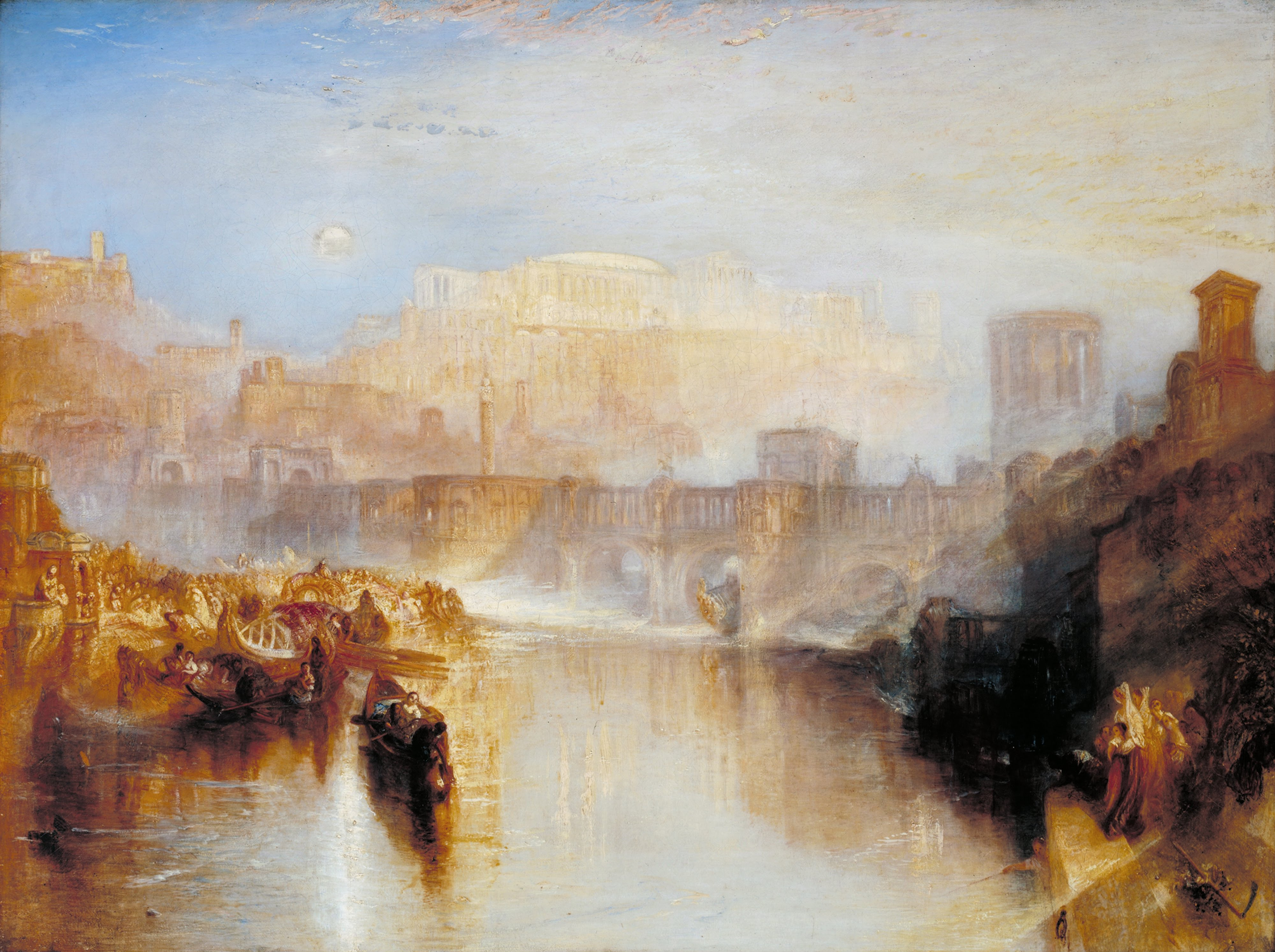
Ancient Rome – Agrippina Landing with the Ashes of Germanicus by J.M.W. Turner

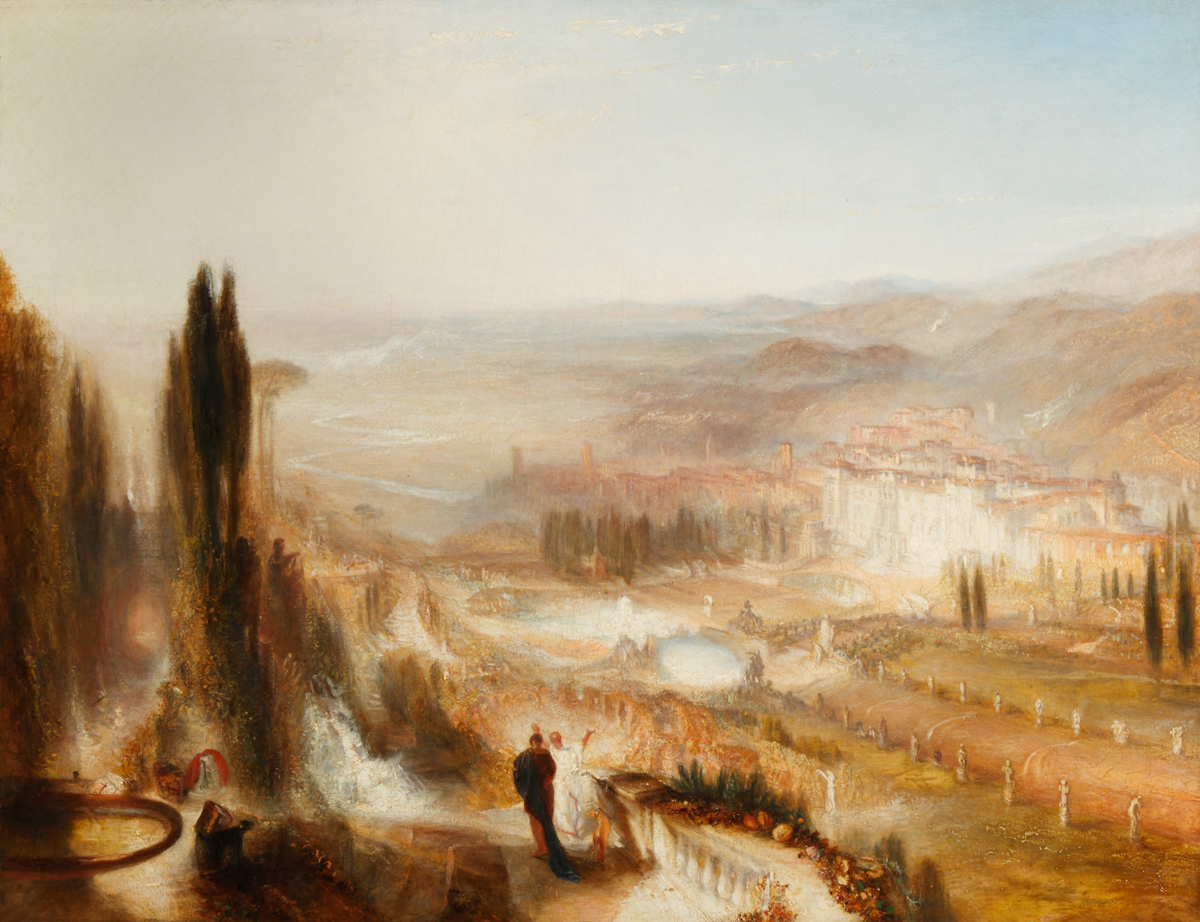
Cicero at His Villa at Tusculum by J.M.W. Turner

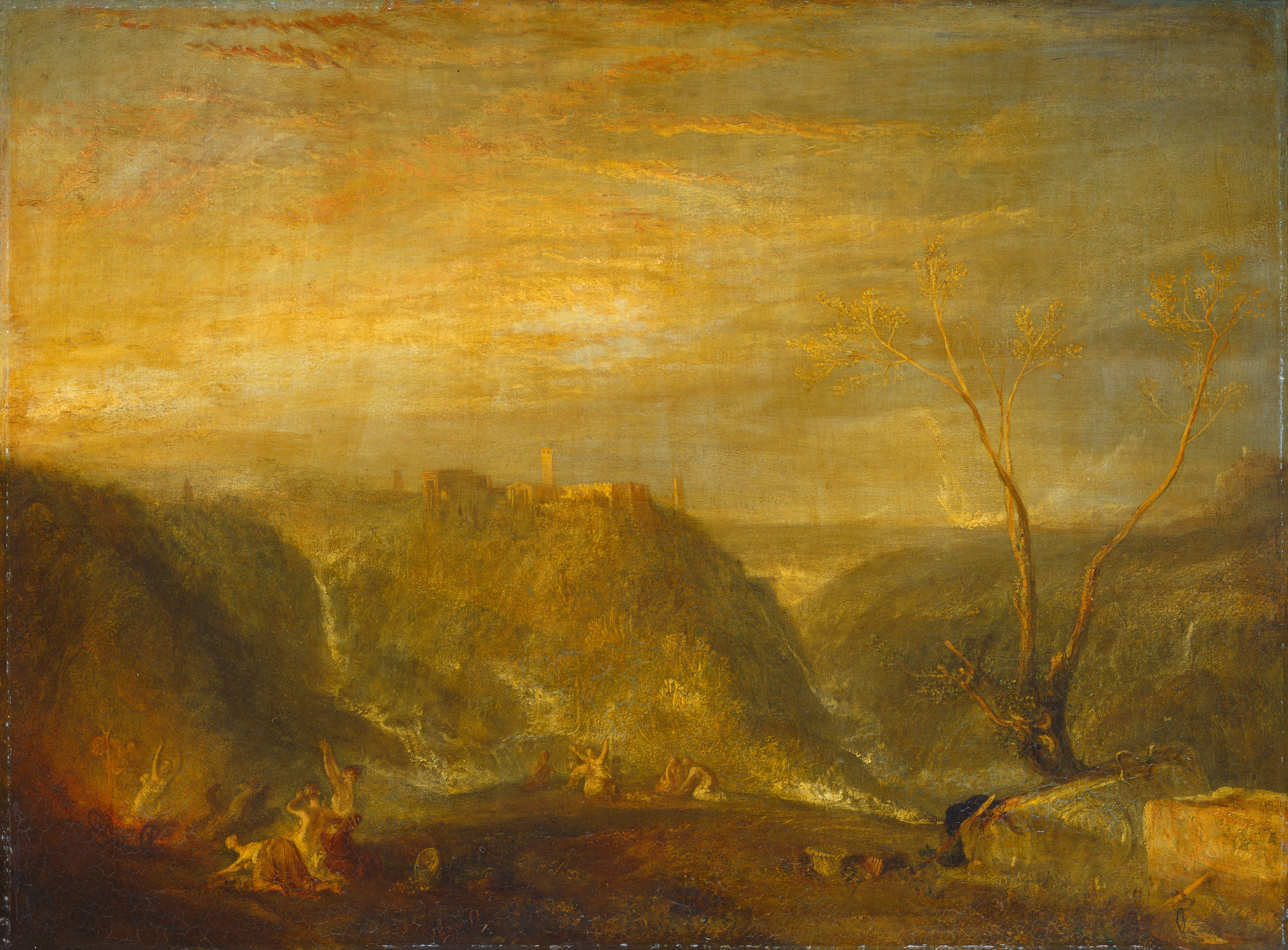
The Rape of Proserpine by J.M.W. Turner

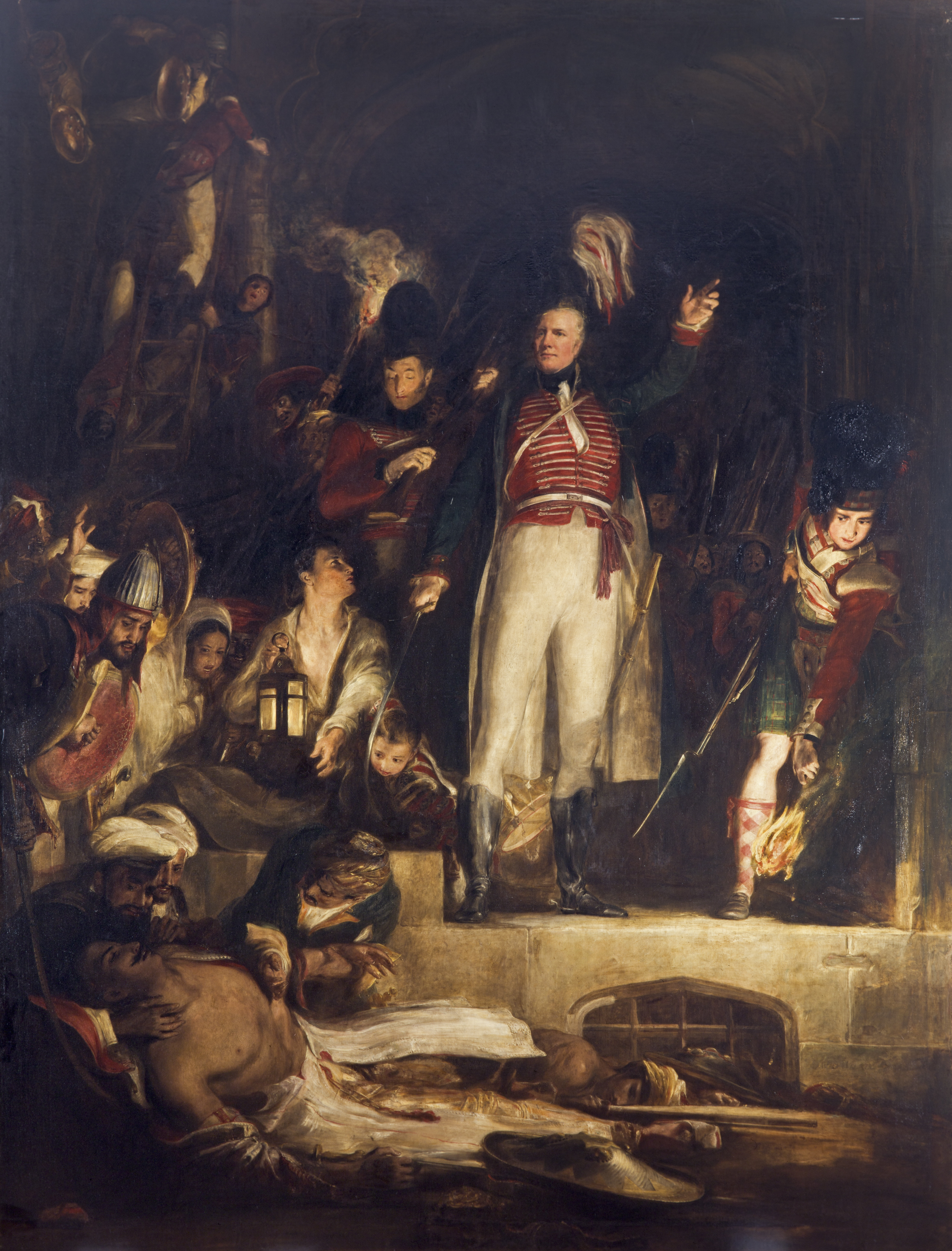
Sir David Baird Discovering the Body of Sultan Tipoo Sahib by David Wilkie

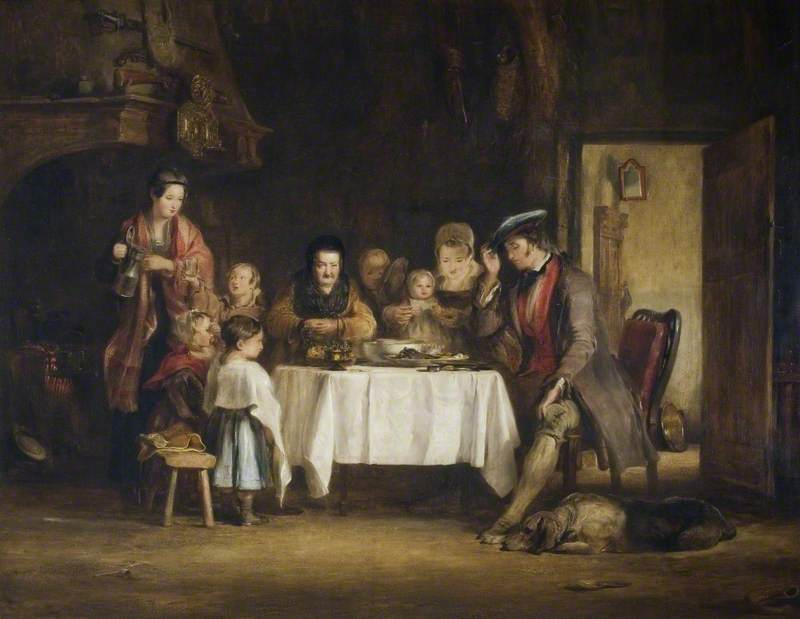
Grace Before Meat by David Wilkie

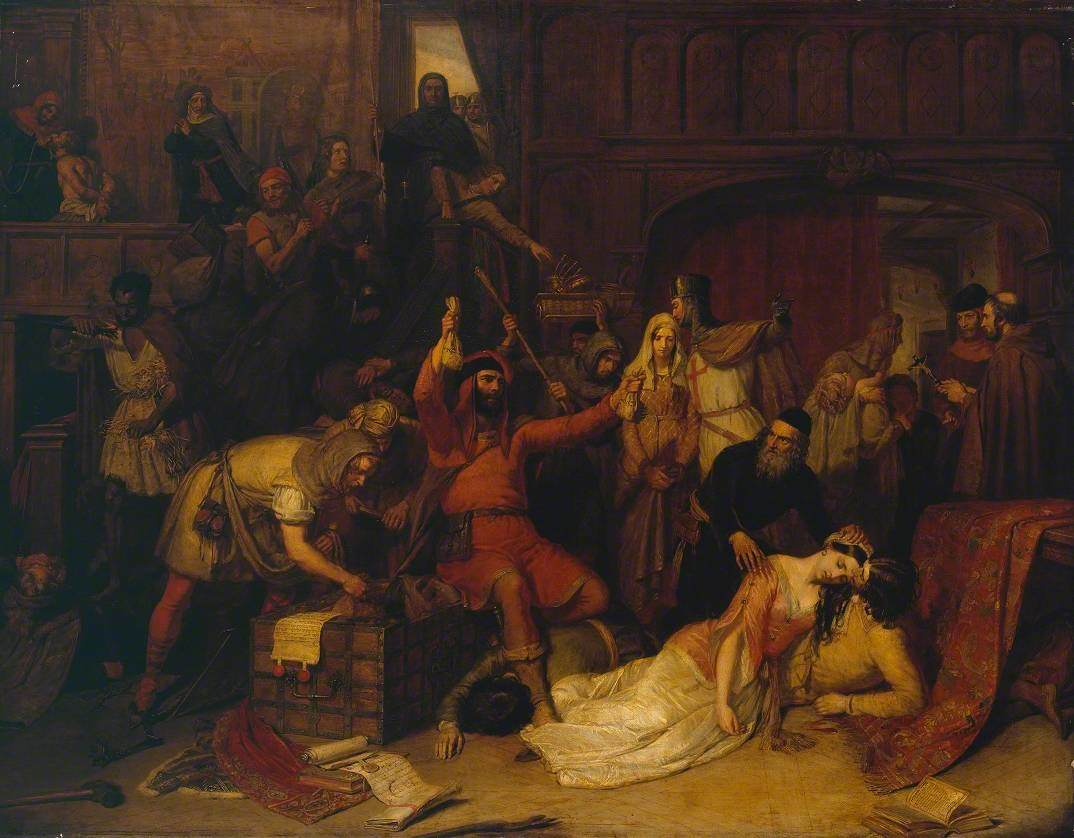
The Pillaging of a Jew's House in the Reign of Richard I by Charles Landseer

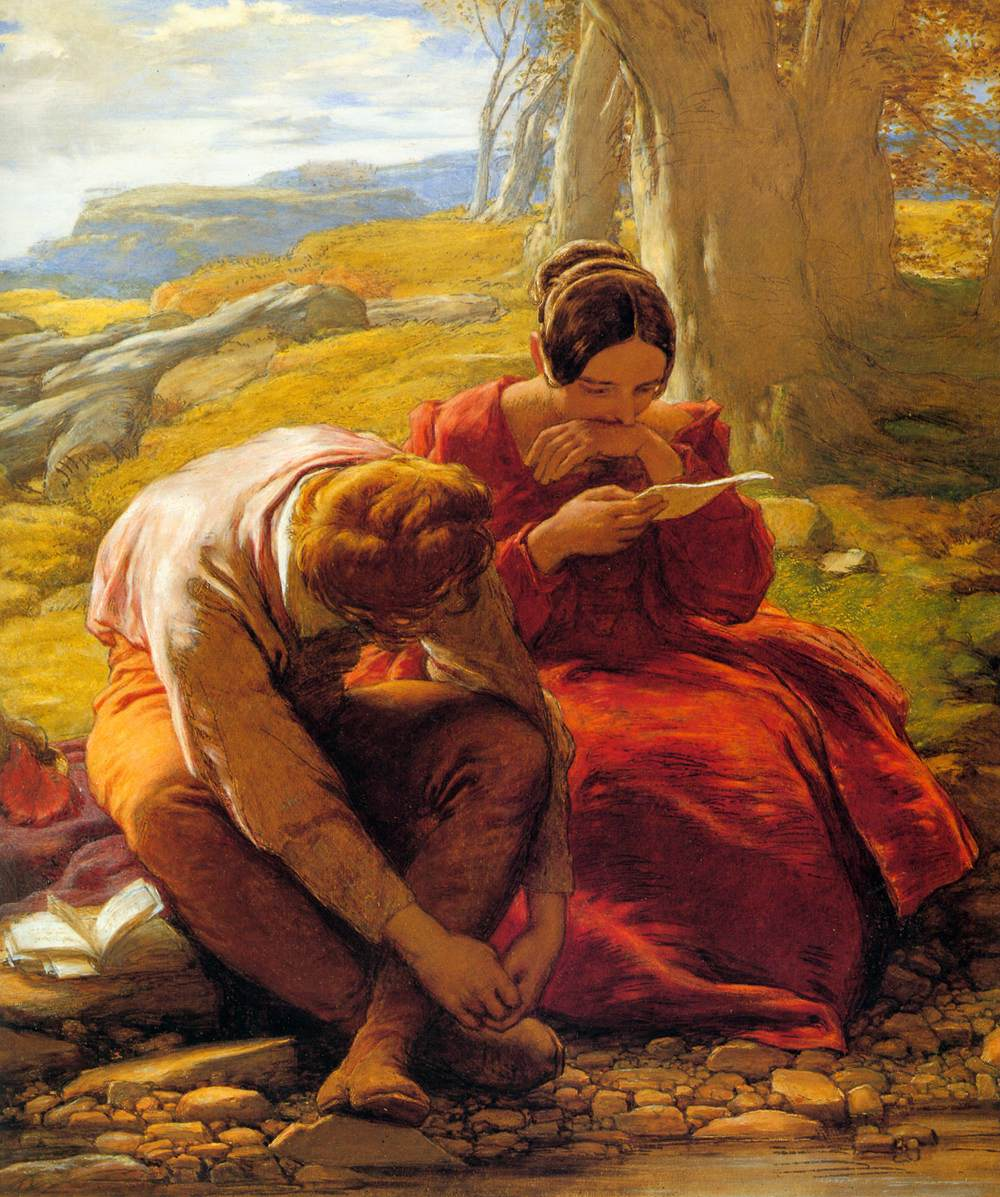
The Sonnet by William Mulready

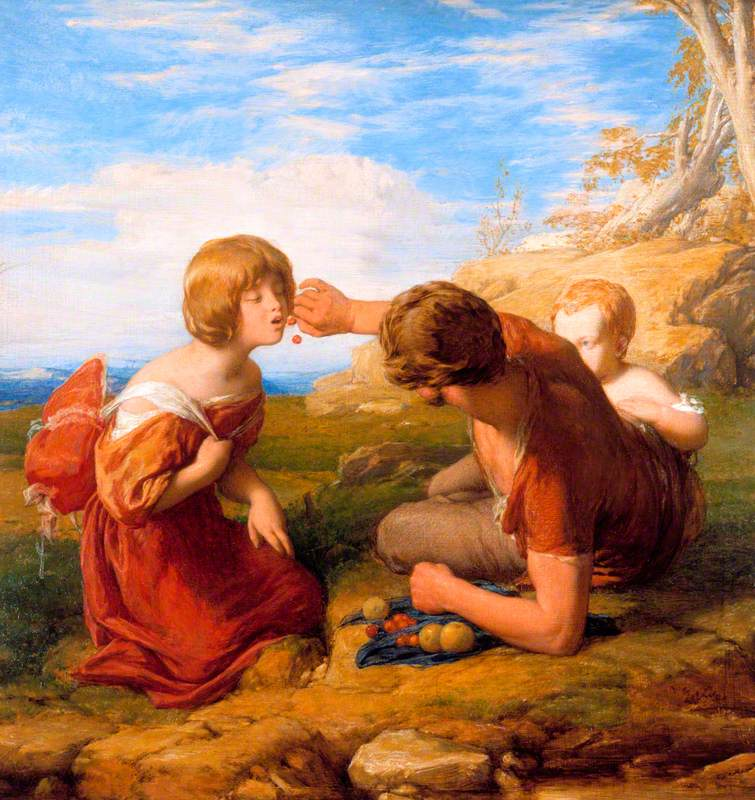
Open Your Mouth and Shut Your Eyes by William Mulready

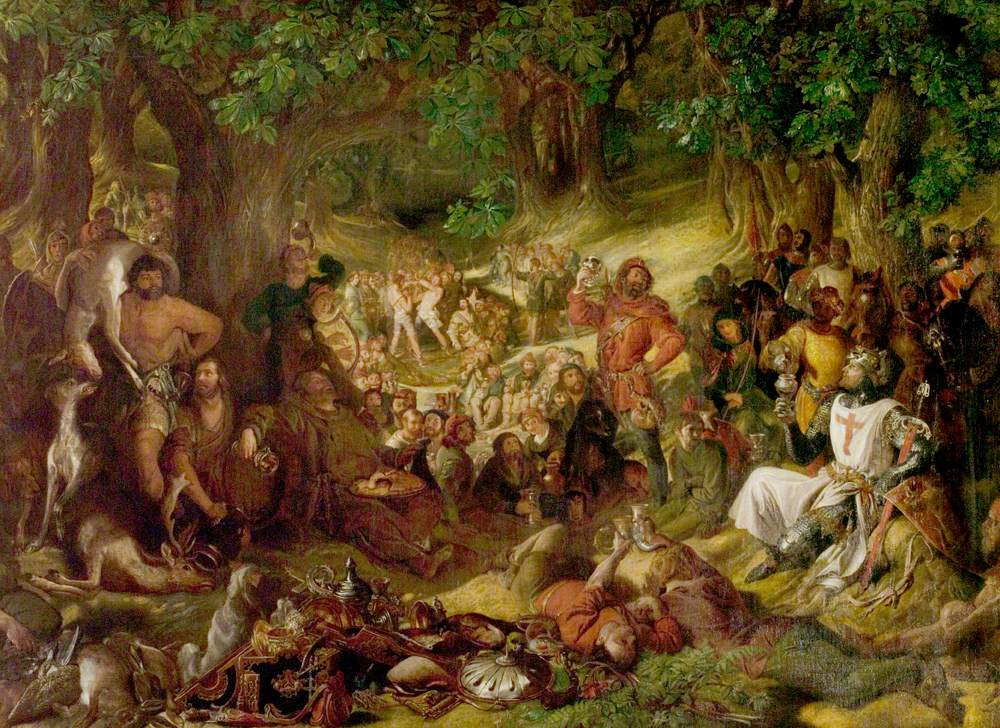
Robin Hood and His Merry Men Entertaining Richard the Lionheart in Sherwood Forest by Daniel Maclise

Lady Jane Grey at Her Place of Execution by Solomon Hart

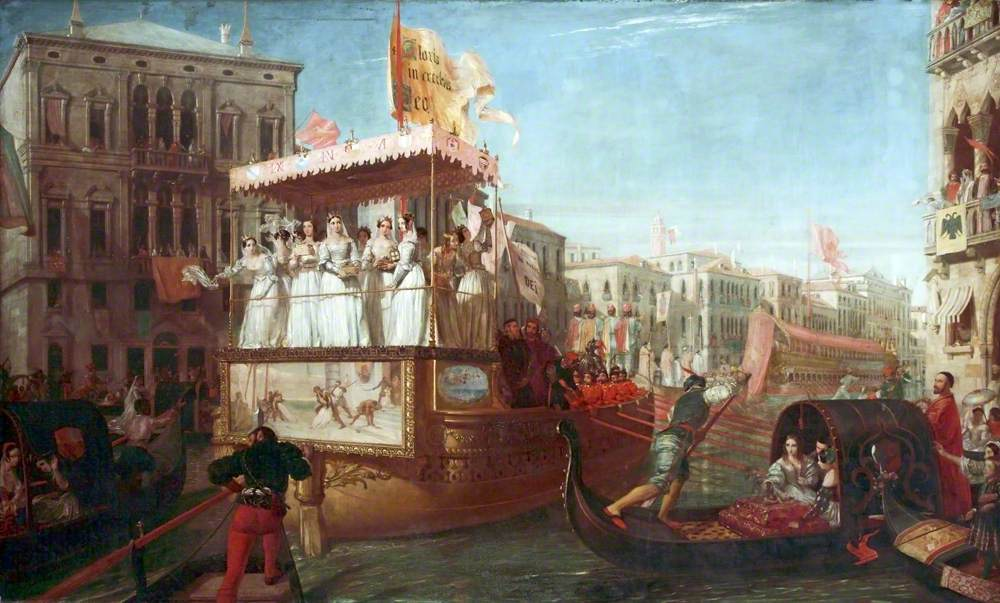
The Brides of Venice by John Rogers Herbert

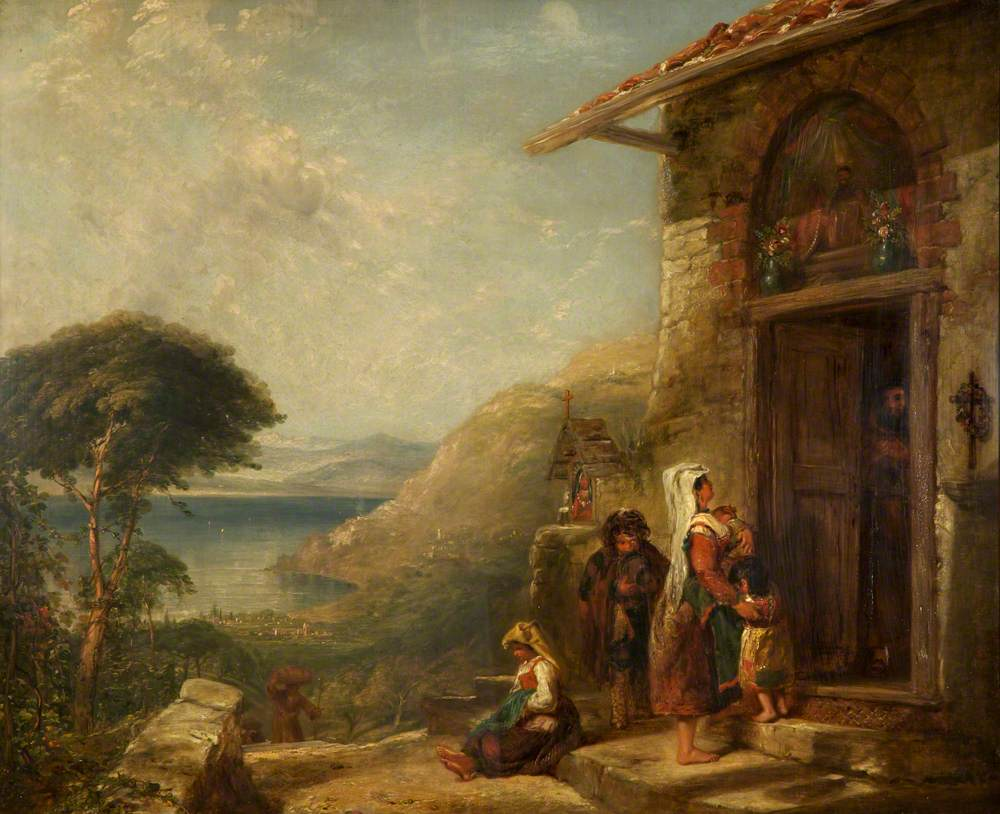
Poor Travellers at the Door of a Capuchin Convent near Vico, Bay of Naples by William Collins

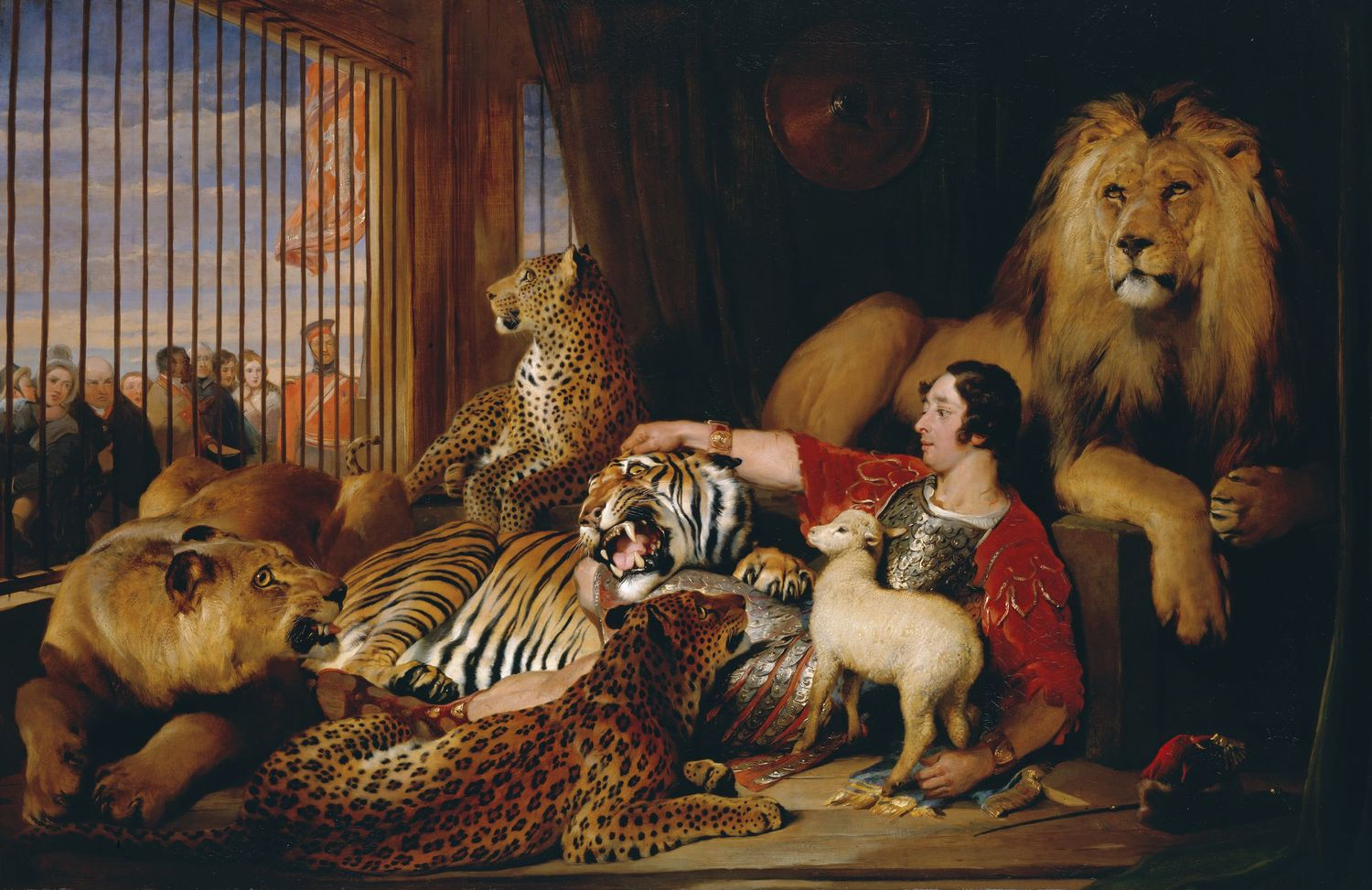
Isaac van Amburgh and his Animals by Edwin Landseer

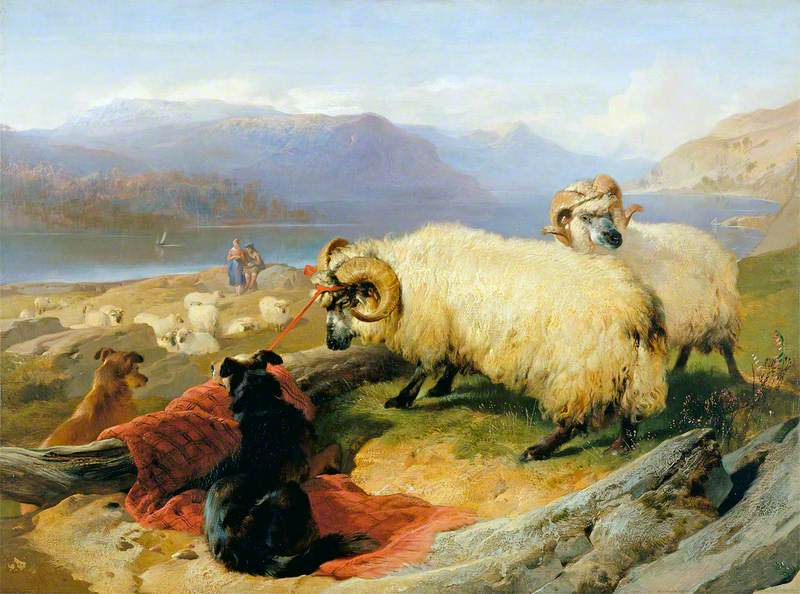
Tethered Rams by Edwin Landseer

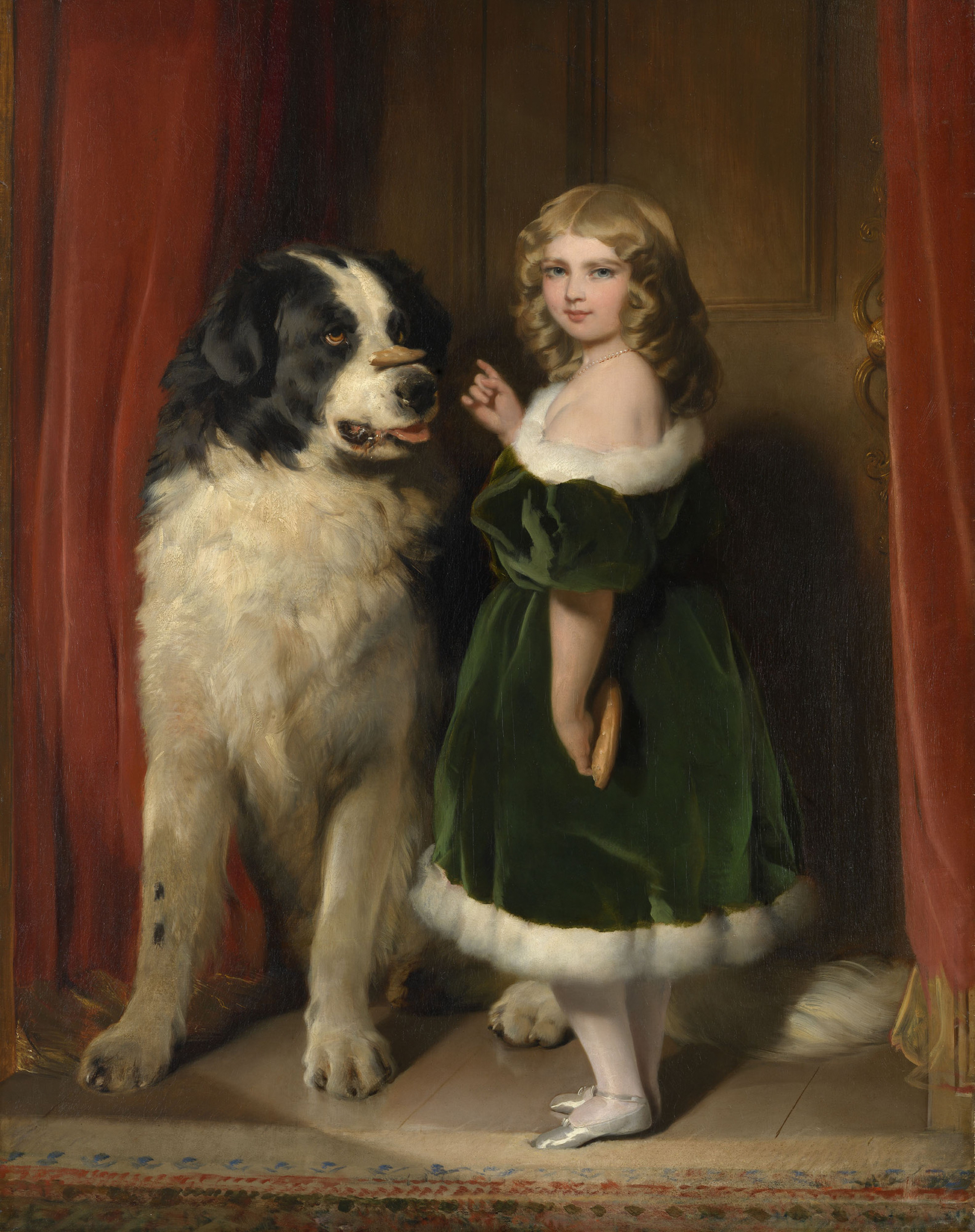
Princess Mary of Cambridge with Nelson by Edwin Landseer

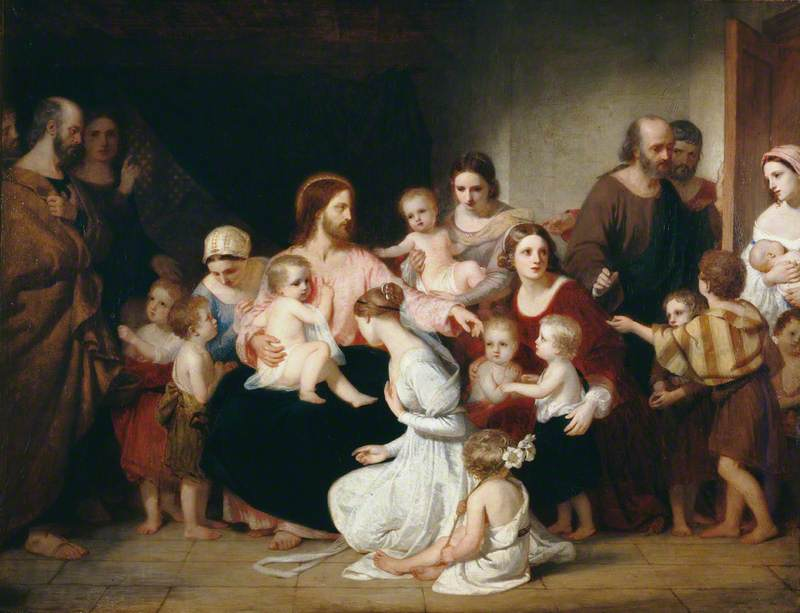
Christ Blessing Little Children by Charles Lock Eastlake

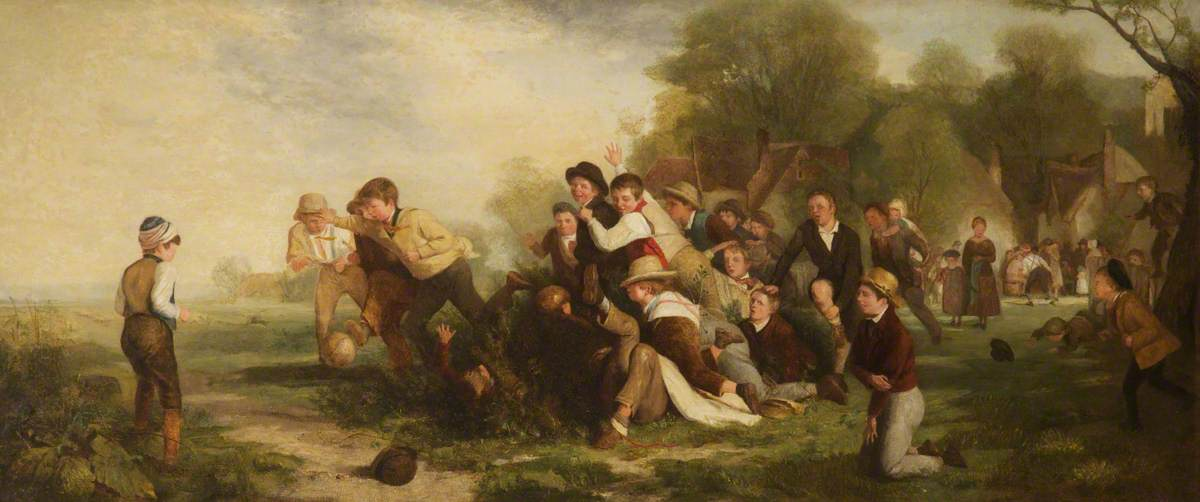
The Football Game by Thomas Webster

The Entry of the Black Prince into London by James Ramsay

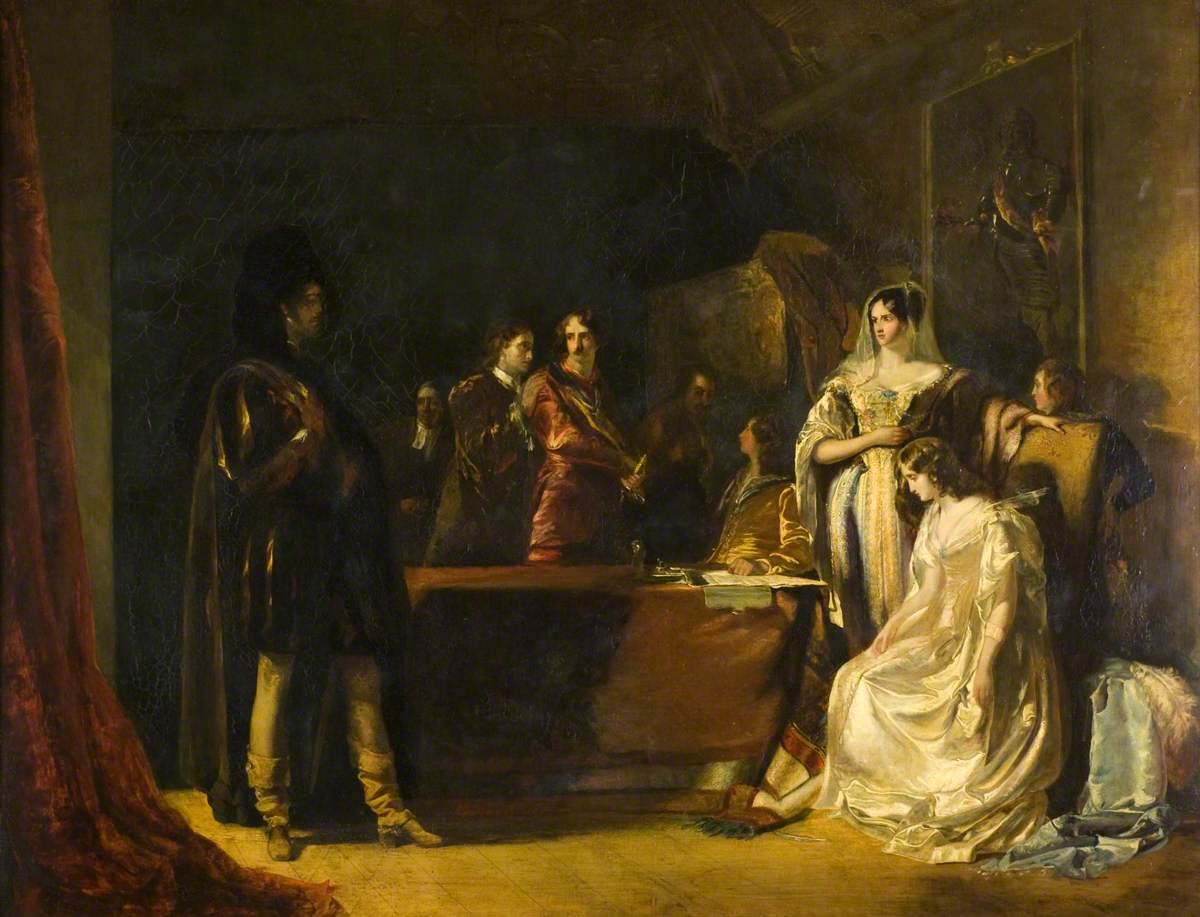
The Bride of Lammermoor by Robert Scott Lauder

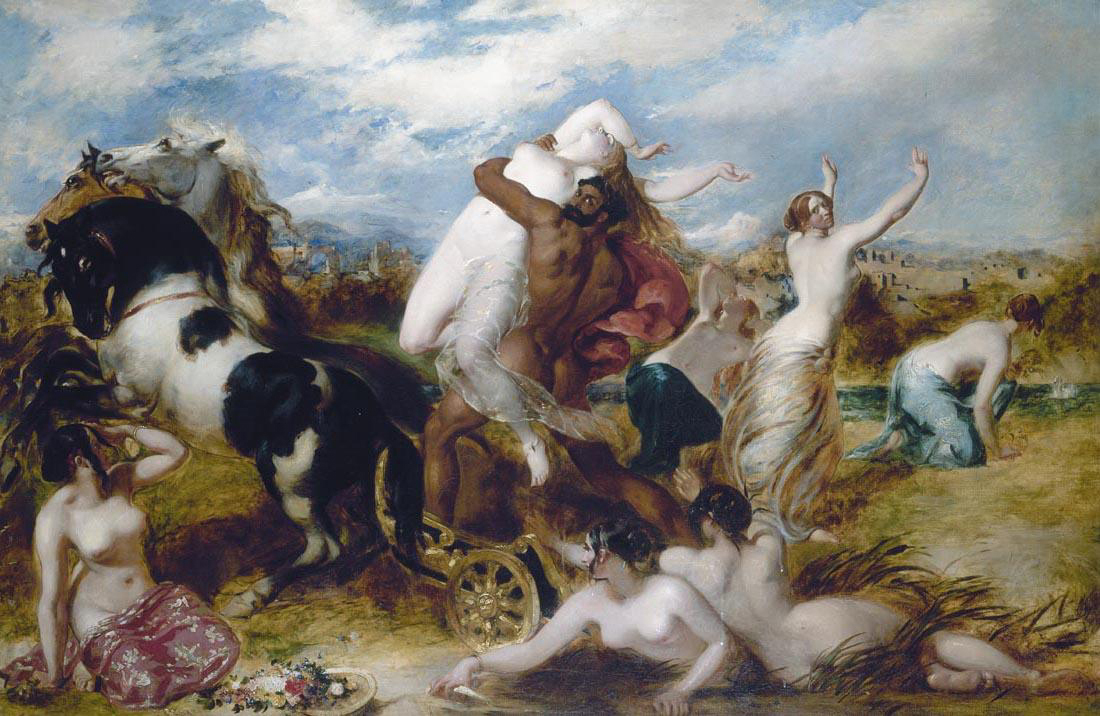
Pluto Carrying off Proserpine by William Etty

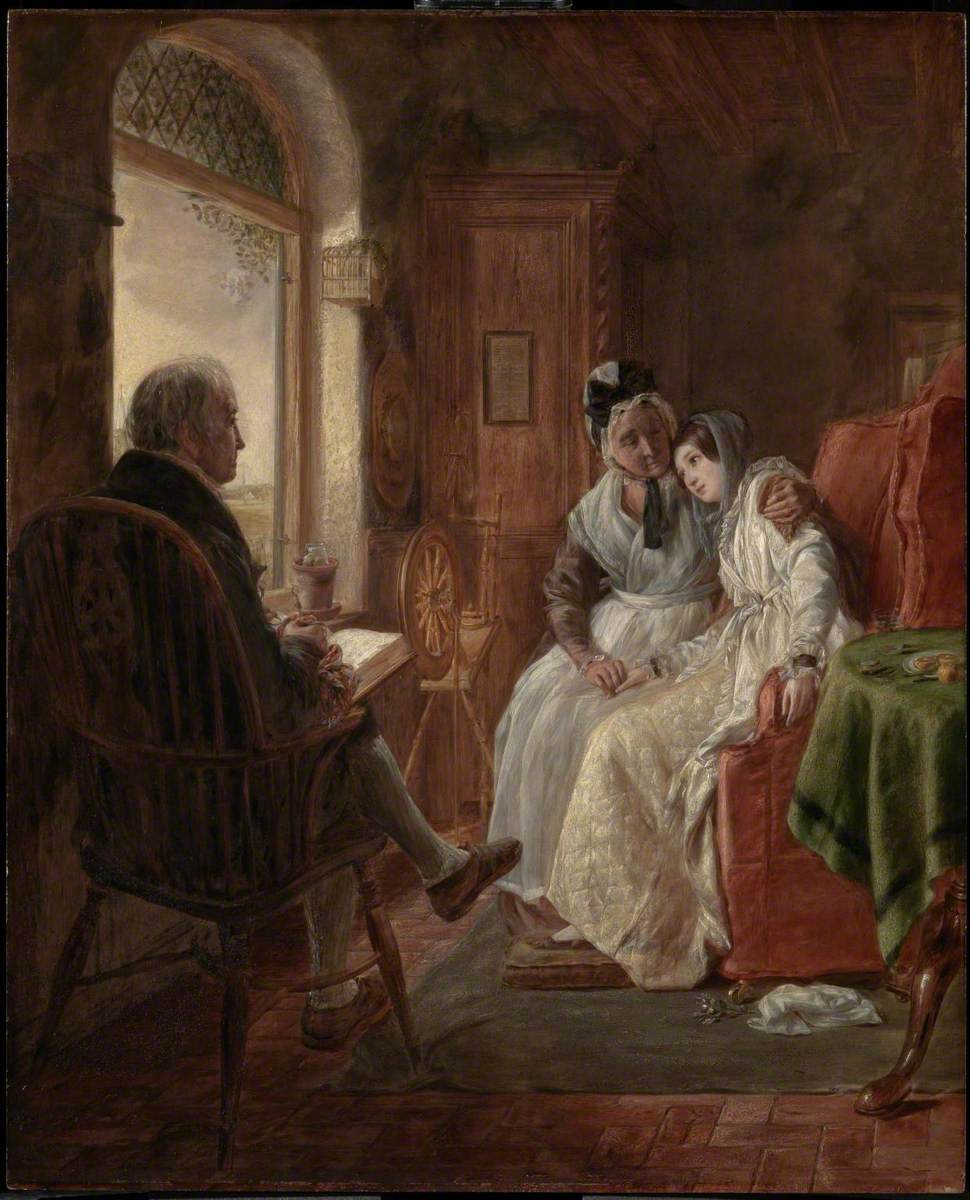
The Pride of the Village by John Callcott Horsley

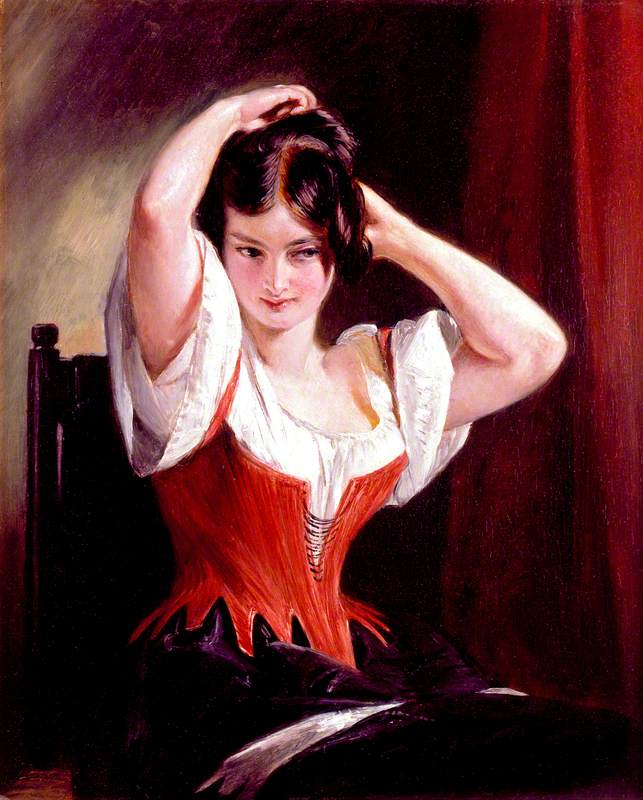
Dulcinea del Toboso by Charles Robert Leslie

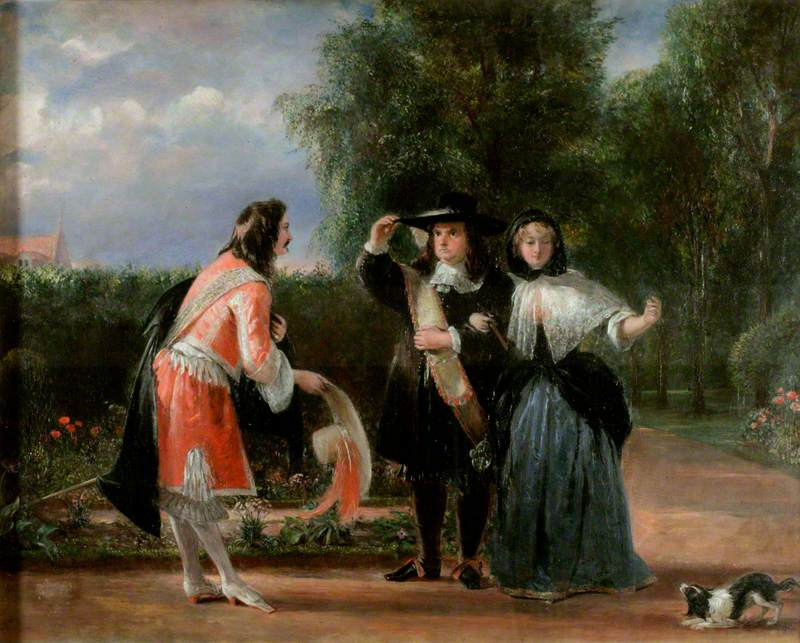
Who Can This Be? by Charles Robert Leslie

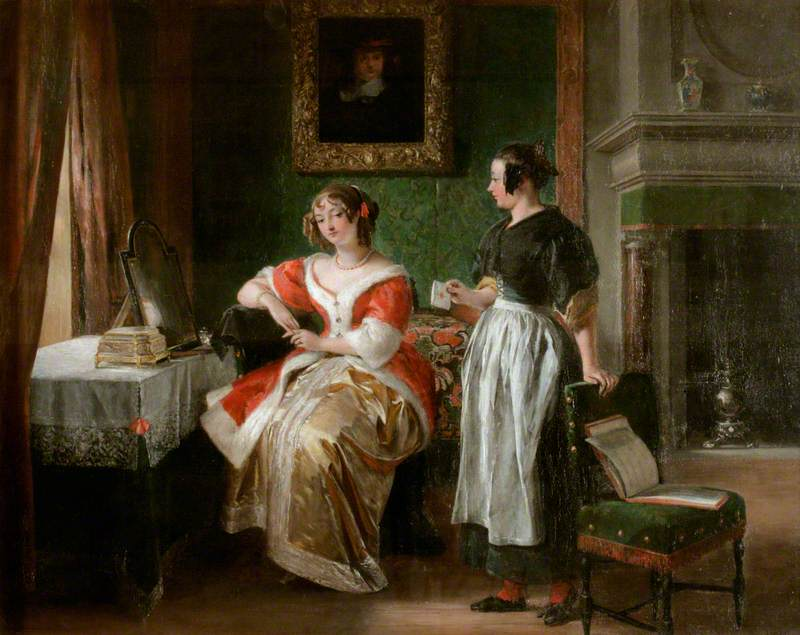
Who Can This Be From? by Charles Robert Leslie

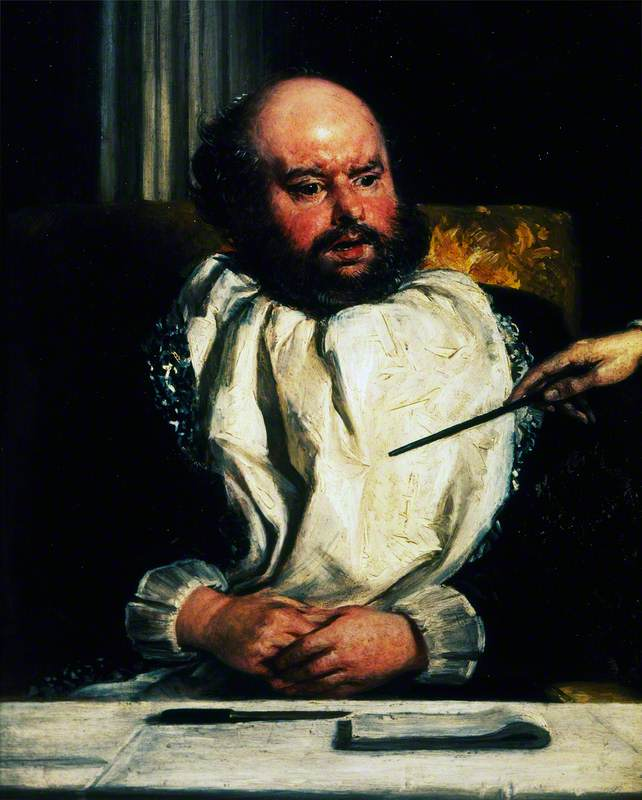
Sancho Panza by Charles Robert Leslie

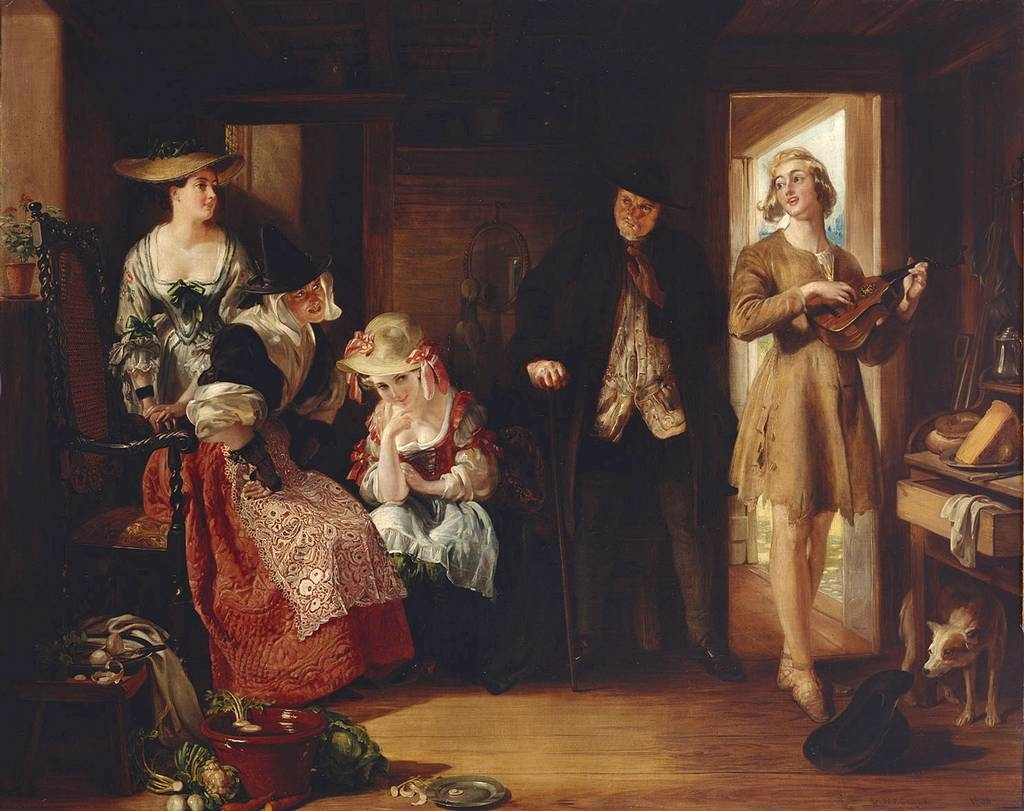
A Scene from Midas by Daniel Maclise

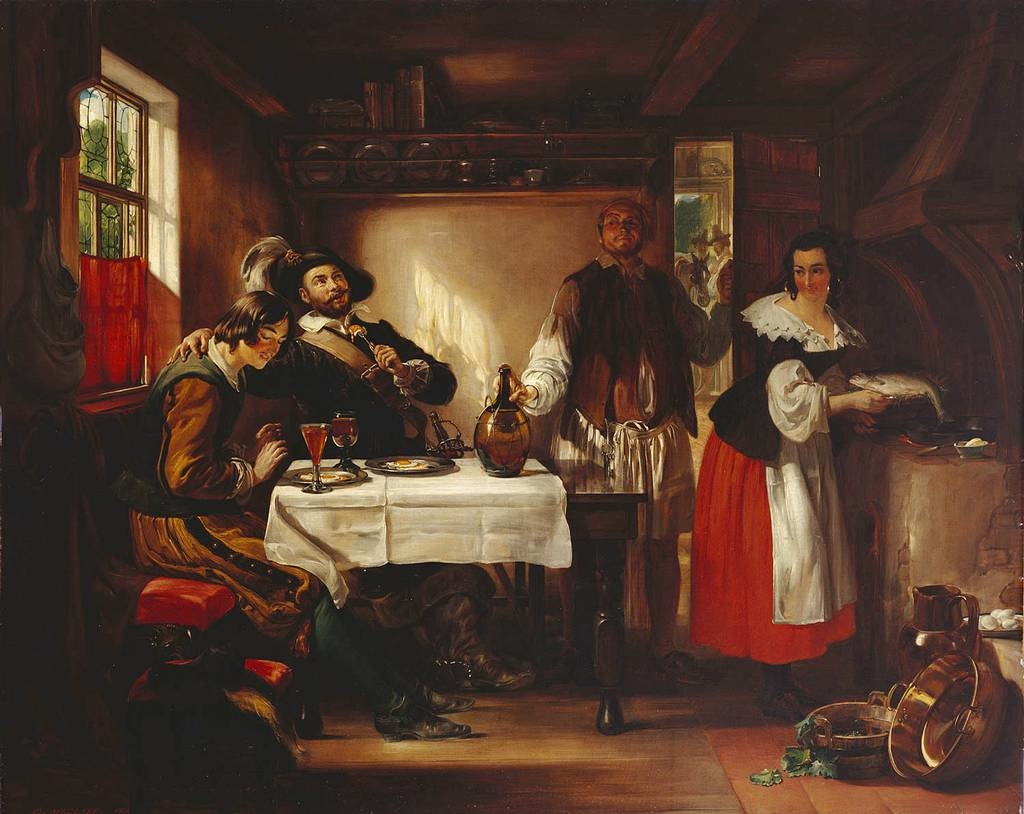
A Scene from Gil Blas by Daniel Maclise

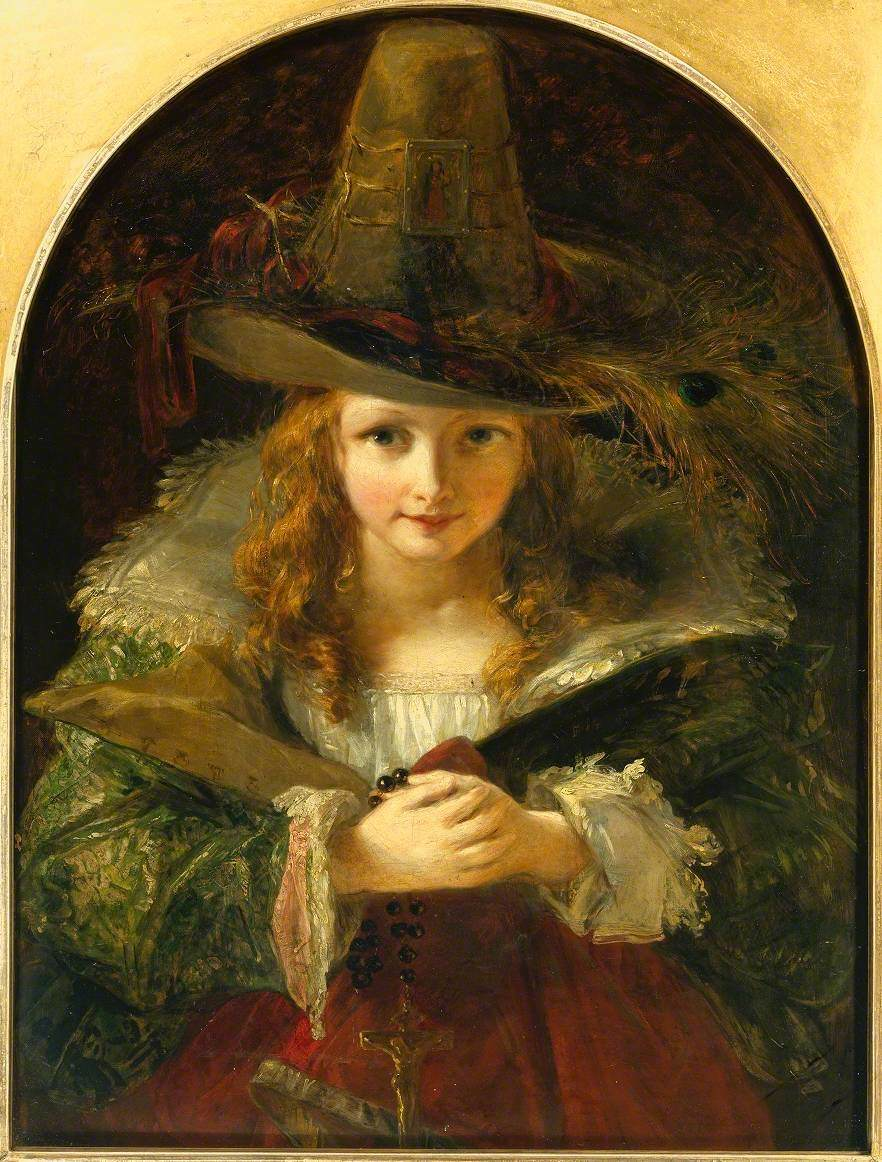
Le Chapeau de Brigand by Thomas Uwins

The Melton Hunt Going to Draw the Ram's Head Cover by Francis Grant

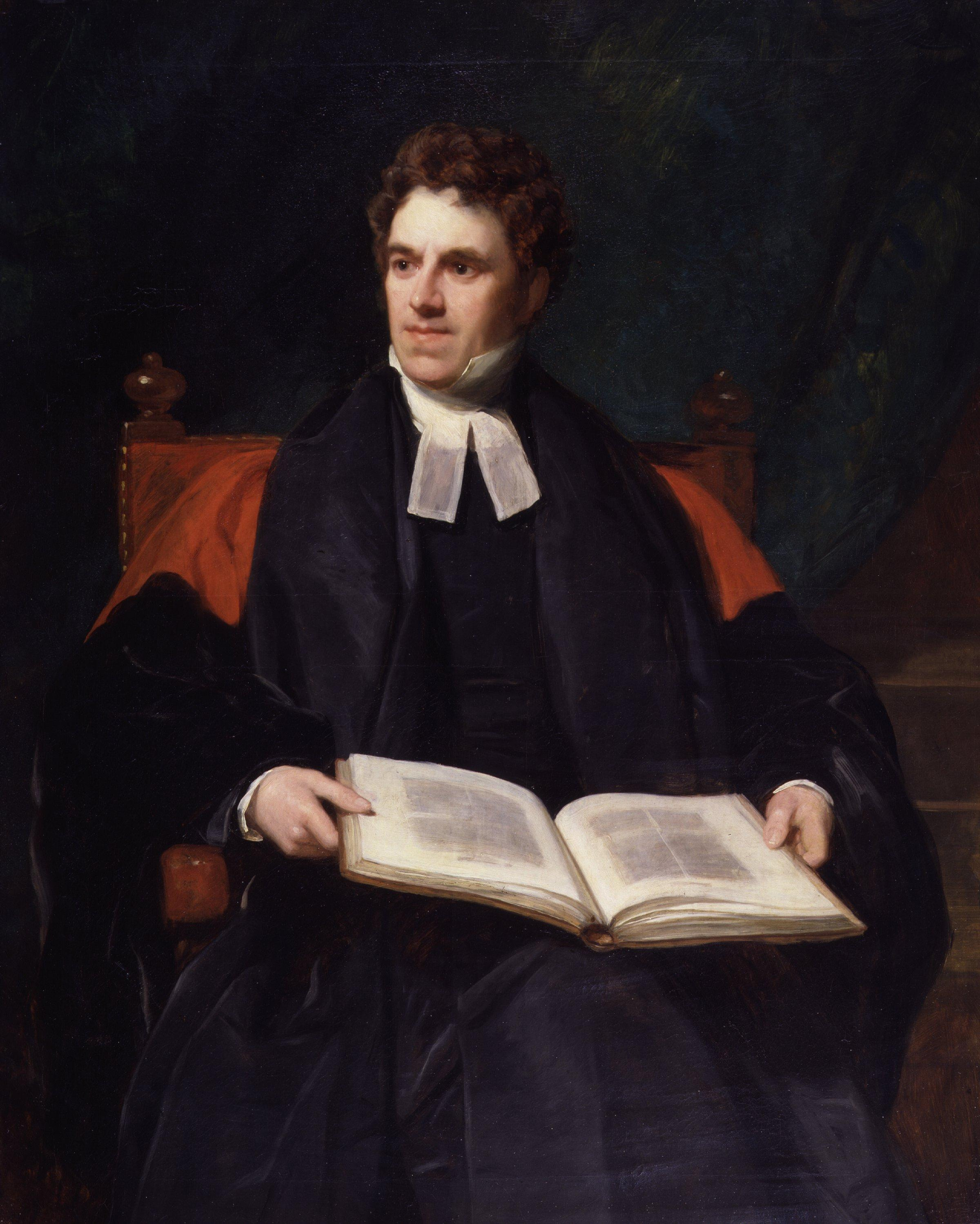
Portrait of Thomas Arnold by Thomas Phillips

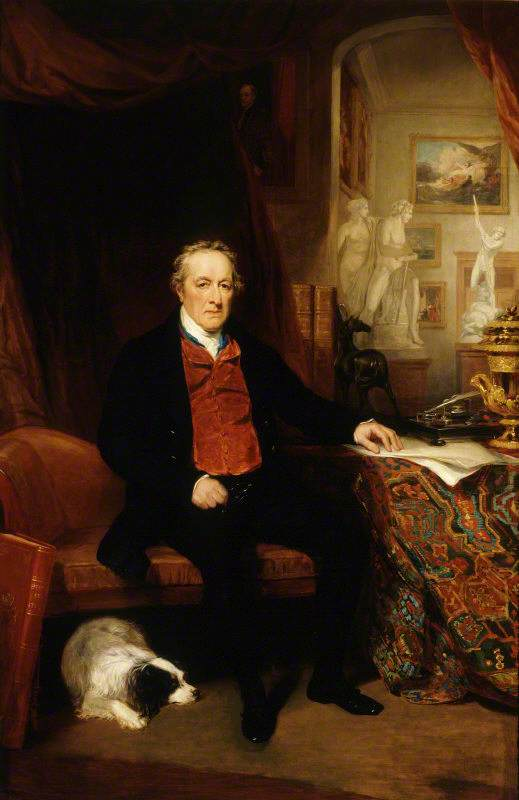
Portrait of the Earl of Egremont by Thomas Phillips

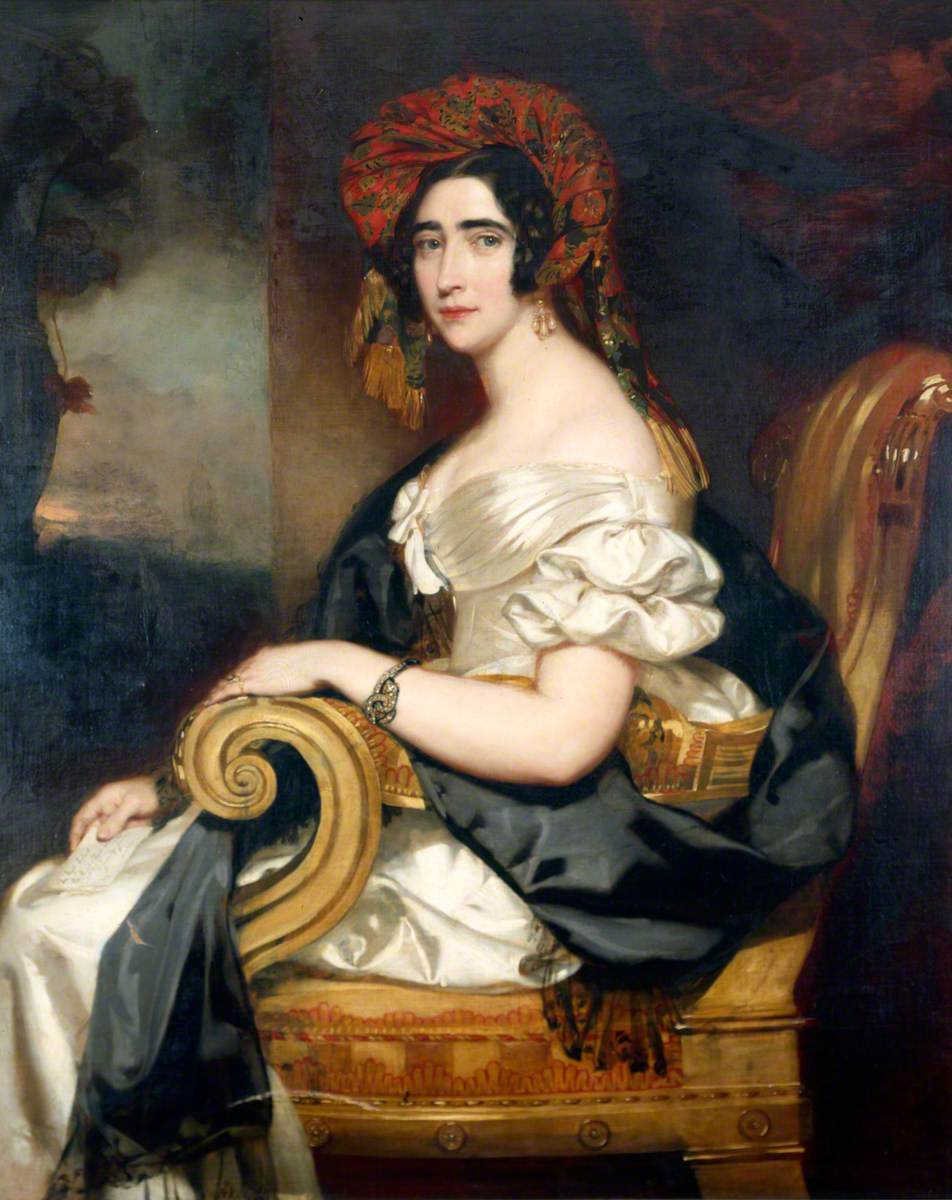
Portrait of the Duchess of Cambridge by John Lucas

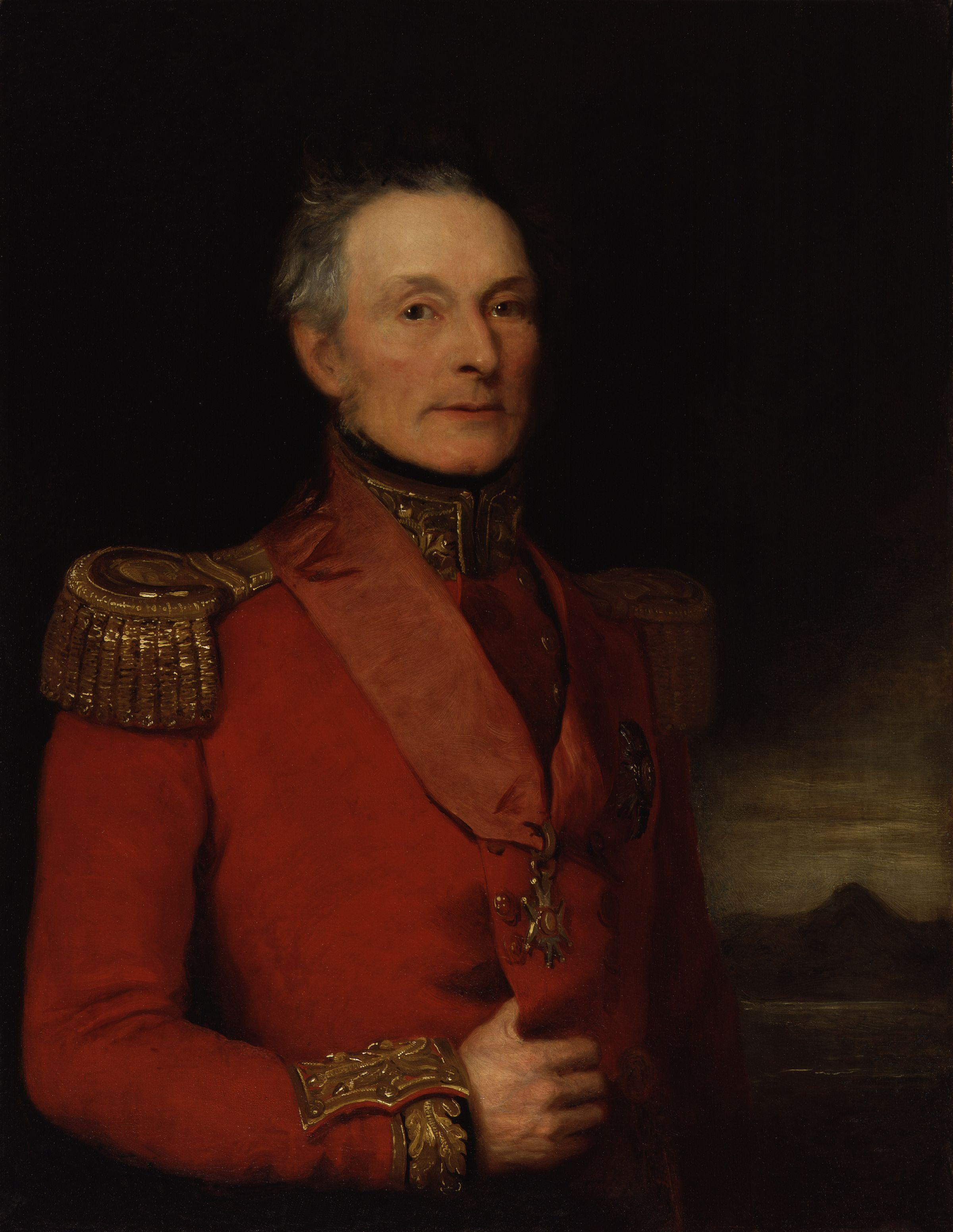
Portrait of Henry Sheehy Keating by Andrew Morton

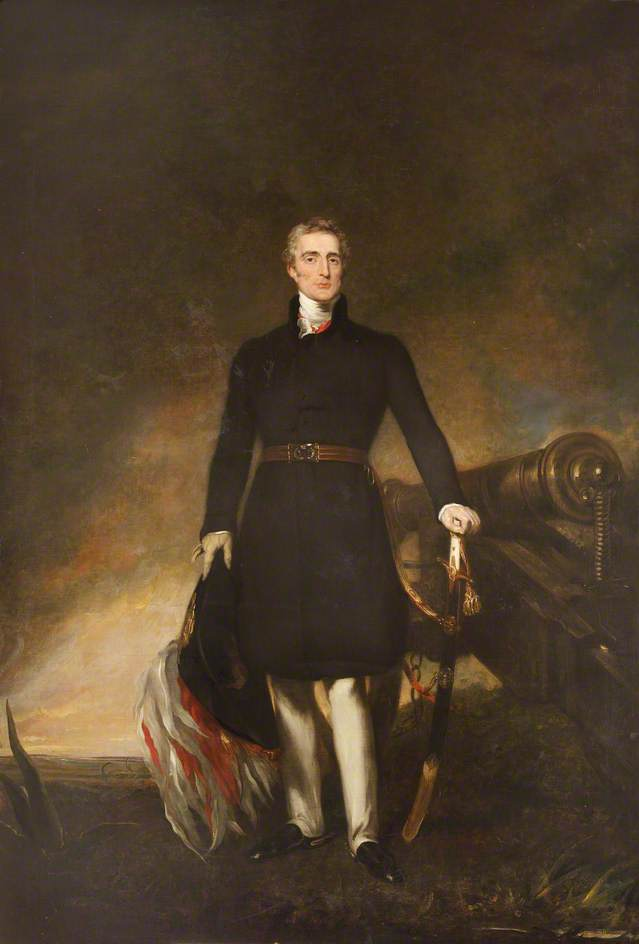
Portrait of the Duke of Wellington by John Simpson

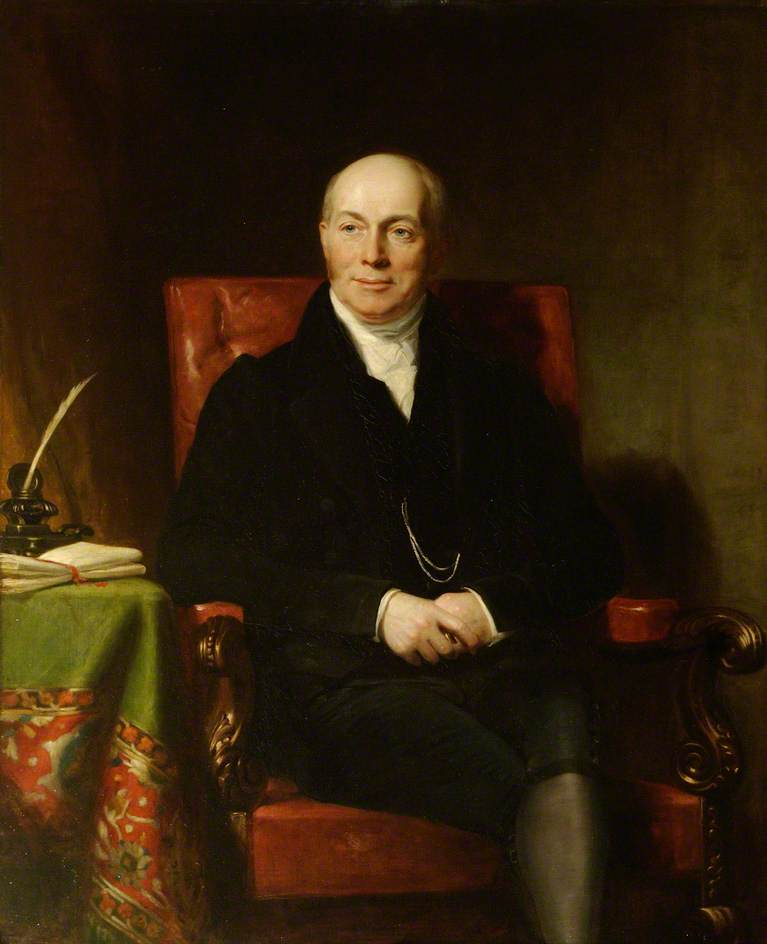
Portrait of Thomas Estcourt by Henry William Pickersgill

Portrait of the Earl of Derby by Henry Perronet Briggs

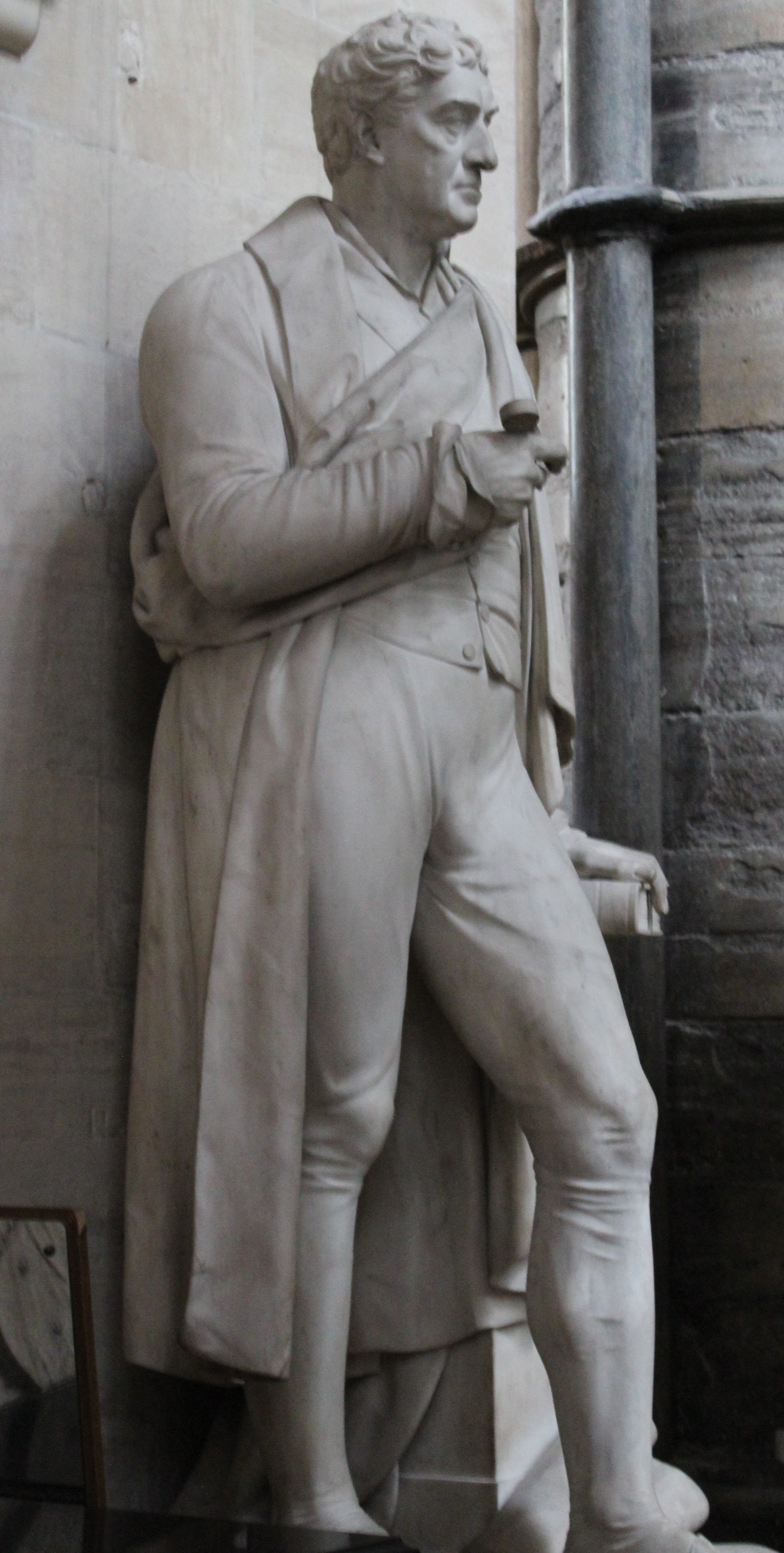
Statue of Thomas Telford by Edward Hodges Baily

== See also ==
- Salon of 1839, a contemporary French exhibition held at the Louvre in Paris

== Bibliography ==
- Bailey, Anthony. J.M.W. Turner: Standing in the Sun. Tate Enterprises Ltd, 2013.
- Hamilton, James. Turner - A Life. Sceptre, 1998.
- Ormond, Richard. Sir Edwin Landseer. Philadelphia Museum of Art, 1981.
- Shanes, Eric. The Life and Masterworks of J.M.W. Turner. Parkstone International, 2012.
- Tromans, Nicholas. David Wilkie: The People's Painter. Edinburgh University Press, 2007.
