= Cicero at His Villa at Tusculum =

Painting by J. M. W. Turner

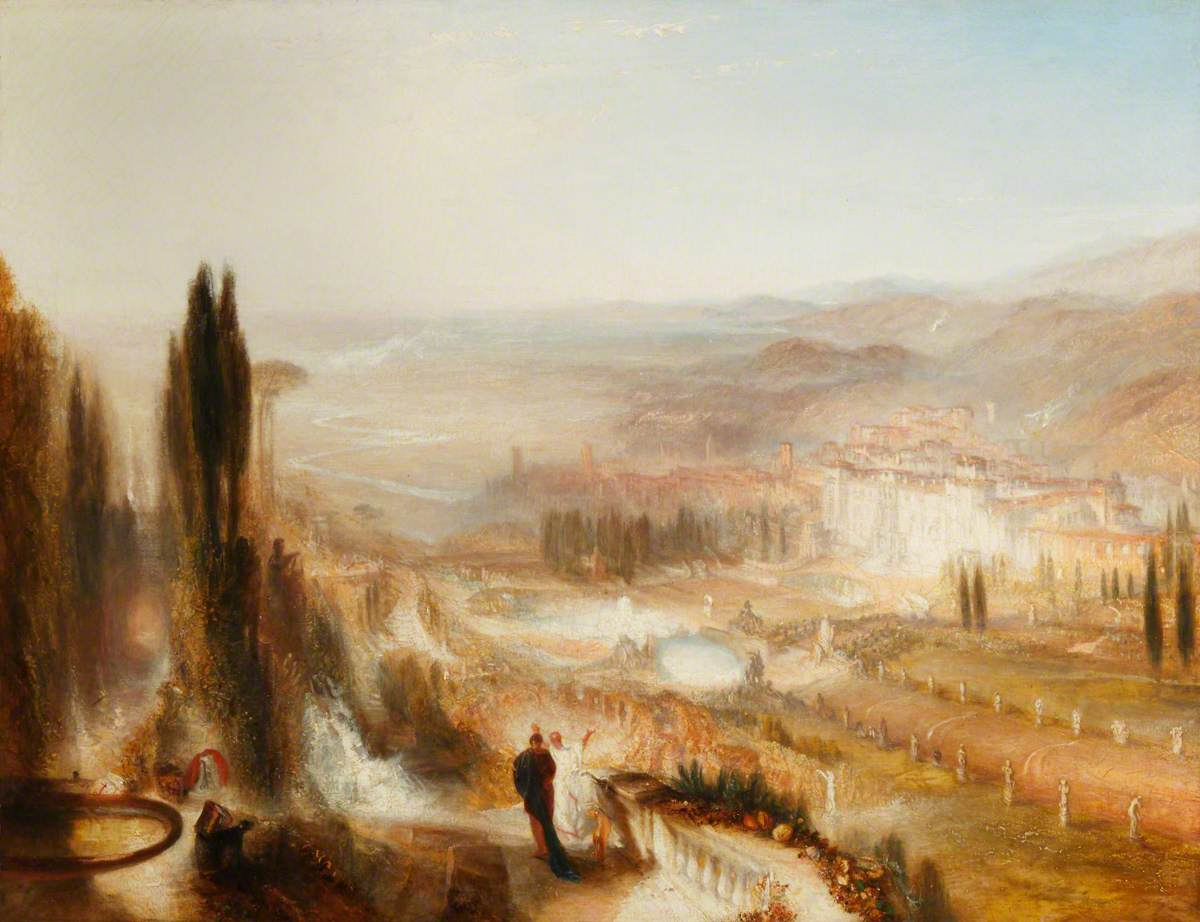
- Artist: J. M. W. Turner
- Year: 1839
- Type: Oil on canvas, landscape painting
- Dimensions: 92.5 cm × 123.5 cm (36.4 in × 48.6 in)
- Location: Ascott House, Buckinghamshire

Cicero at His Villa at Tusculum is an 1839 historical landscape painting by the British artist J.M.W. Turner. It imagines a view of the villa of the Roman statesman Cicero, located at Tusculum in the Alban Hills.

It was partly intended to pay tribute to the eighteenth century British landscape artist Richard Wilson who had produced a similar scene, and whose work and was strongly influenced by his time in Italy and who Turner felt had become neglected in a manner similar to Cicero.

The painting was displayed at the Royal Academy Exhibition of 1839 held at the National Gallery in Trafalgar Square. Today the painting is displayed at Ascott House in Buckinghamshire.

== See also ==
- List of paintings by J. M. W. Turner

== Bibliography ==
- Bailey, Anthony. J.M.W. Turner: Standing in the Sun. Tate Enterprises, 2013.
- Kelly, Frank. J.M.W. Turner. Tate Publishing, 2007.
- Pugh, Simon (ed.) Reading Landscape Country, City, Capital. Manchester University Press, 1990.
- Smiles, Sam. J. M. W. Turner: The Making of a Modern Artist. Manchester University Press, 2017.
