= Isaac A. Van Amburgh =

American animal trainer

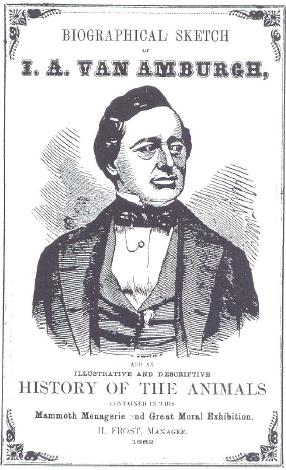
Isaac Van Amburgh Biographical Sketch, ca. 1860

Isaac A. Van Amburgh (1811–1865) was an American animal trainer who developed the first trained wild animal act in modern times. By introducing jungle acts into the circus, Van Amburgh paved the way for combining menageries with circuses. After that, menageries began using equestrian and clown performances in circus rings. Gradually the distinction between circus and menagerie faded.

Starting as a cage-cleaner in the Zoological Institute of New York, Van Amburgh quickly gained notoriety for his acts of daring, for example placing his bare arm, and even his head, inside the jaws of a wild cat. Also known for his domineering attitude toward his animals, he earned the title "The Lion King."

Despite the disapproval of some for his brutal treatment of animals, Van Amburgh remained very popular and successful, beginning his own menagerie which he took to Europe. He died a wealthy man, and his name continued to be used in the circus world for more than a century after.

== Early life and beginning of career ==
Isaac A. Van Amburgh (a name adopted by his American Indian grandfather) was born on May 26, 1808, in Fishkill, New York. Van Amburgh's early life, though atypical, proved to be of great training for his later adventures as "the Lion King." Van Amburgh's father died when he was still an infant, leaving him and his mother with very little. The night before Amburgh was born, his mother had a strange dream. According to Richard Horne in The Life of Van Amburgh, the Brute-Tamer: With Anecdotes of His Extraordinary Pupils, she dreamt that she walked into an old barn with rows of cooking kettles lined up. As she opened the kettles one by one, she found different parts of a lion's body cooking in the kettle. She then proceeded to devour the lion part by part and put the lion's whole head in her mouth. She woke up extremely disturbed, having no idea what this dream meant for her son's future. Horne goes on to describe how Isaac's mother was constantly worried about him while he was growing up. Legend dictates that while reading the Bible, young Isaac came upon the tale of Daniel in the lions' den, and, from then on, was determined to be a lion tamer. Van Amburgh never showed the same interests in material objects or even games as the other children. Rather, he spent his time surrounded by roaches, mice, and rats, feeding them pieces of his dinner to attract and even train them. He soon became a sort of animal authority to call when the local wildlife disrupted neighborhood homes and farms. Van Amburgh would investigate reports of destroyed or stolen crops and livestock and seek out the animal responsible. Upon finding the offender, he would beat the creature into submission, effectively preventing it from causing additional problems. He found his start in the Zoological Institute of New York.

=== Zoological Institute of New York ===
At nineteen, Isaac left his home in Peekskill, New York to look for a job in neighboring North Salem. There he found a job as a cage cleaner in the Zoological Institute of New York.

Despite its name, the Zoological Institute was not a zoo at all, but rather a tiny traveling menagerie. In a period of time when amusement was regarded with suspicion, it was from its name that this show got its value.

Although he started out as a "cage boy," Isaac showed an aptitude for training the wild animals whose cages he cleaned. One of the owners of the Zoological Institute, Titus, was a dealer in wild animals. So he appreciated the novelty of trained wild animals, recognizing that "novelty plus publicity meant money."

June, Titus, and Angevine distributed posters by the thousands. They put Isaac in costume – a Roman toga, in reference to the gladiators of ancient Rome's Circus Maximus. In the winter, Van Amburgh trained his wild animals in the barns of New York's upper Westchester and the lower Putnam counties. The next year, 1821, the Van Amburgh Menagerie hit New York City.

== The Lion King ==
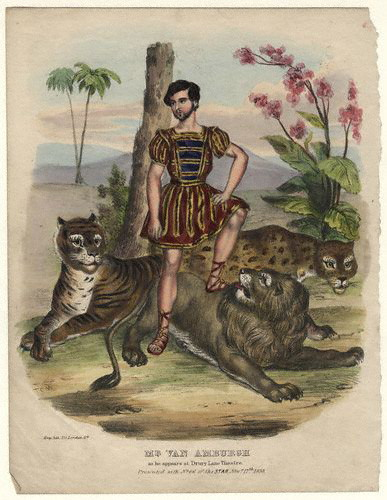
Isaac van Amburgh (1808–1865) by T. C. Wilson 1838 in National Portrait Gallery, London.

In 1833, at age twenty-two, Isaac A. Van Amburgh entered a cage of wild cats at the Zoological Institute. In the cage were a male and female lion, a male and female leopard, a black-maned Cape lion, and a panther. From the Richmond Hill Theatre, New York, Van Amburgh astonished the country. In the words of his biographer, "The effect of his power was instantaneous. The Lion halted and stood transfixed. The Tiger crouched. The Panther with a suppressed growl of rage sprang back, while the Leopard receded gradually from its master. The spectators were overwhelmed with wonder .... Then came the most effective tableaux of all. Van Amburgh with his strong will bade them come to him while he reclined in the back of the cage – the proud King of animal creation."

Van Amburgh did more than just enter the cage. Nathaniel Hawthorne described a menagerie he saw on September 4, 1828, near North Adams, Massachusetts: "A man put his arm and head into the lion's mouth, – all the spectators looking on so attentively that a breath could not be heard. That was impressive, – its effect on a thousand persons, – more than the thing itself." As Van Amburgh was one of the few performers of the time to perform this way, it was probably Van Amburgh that Hawthorne saw. In fact, Van Amburgh is usually credited with being the first man ever to put his head into the mouth of a lion. On July 7, 1838, the New York Mirror also described how Van Amburgh's "fearless acts of placing his bare arm moist with blood, in the lion's mouth and thrusting his head into the distended jaws of the tiger" were watched with keen interest.

=== Van Amburgh's Menagerie ===
Van Amburgh, made an instant hero, discovered he now had the freedom to make his own decisions. By entering lions' dens in and out of the country, he began earning real money. Featured in the "Flatfoot shows," he was able to earn up to four hundred dollars per week. By age twenty-three, he had his own travelling menagerie, and by the mid-1840s his was the largest traveling show in England. In 1861, it was one of America's eleven big traveling shows.Van Amburgh had a structure to his shows that allowed his act to be easily transportable and sustainable, while also providing audience members with knowledge of what they were purchasing tickets to see. A typical show for Isaac Van Amburgh featured several animals including tigers, leopards, lambs, and lions. He showcased animals of all shapes and sizes to promote variety as well as showcase how he could train animals who normally do not get along well together in the same space. He performed his shows in cages that were transportable so that he could move to various venues easily. These venues were popular including the famous Drury Lane Theatre, in which Queen Victoria watched him perform. During his act, he performed several tricks that were known among his audiences. He would ride on the back of a lion, lay the lion and the lamb side by side to show how well tamed they were, and most impressively, stuck his own head inside the mouth of the lion to show how docile he had rendered the animal.

Even after the 1868 fire that killed Van Amburgh's animals and destroyed other circus artifacts, the potent name of Van Amburgh continued to be used by circuses until 1922.

Elephant Hill Road in Connersville, Indiana, is named for the elephant Tippo Sahib who died and was buried on that hill. Tippo Sahib was part of the Van Amburgh circus.

=== London and Queen Victoria ===
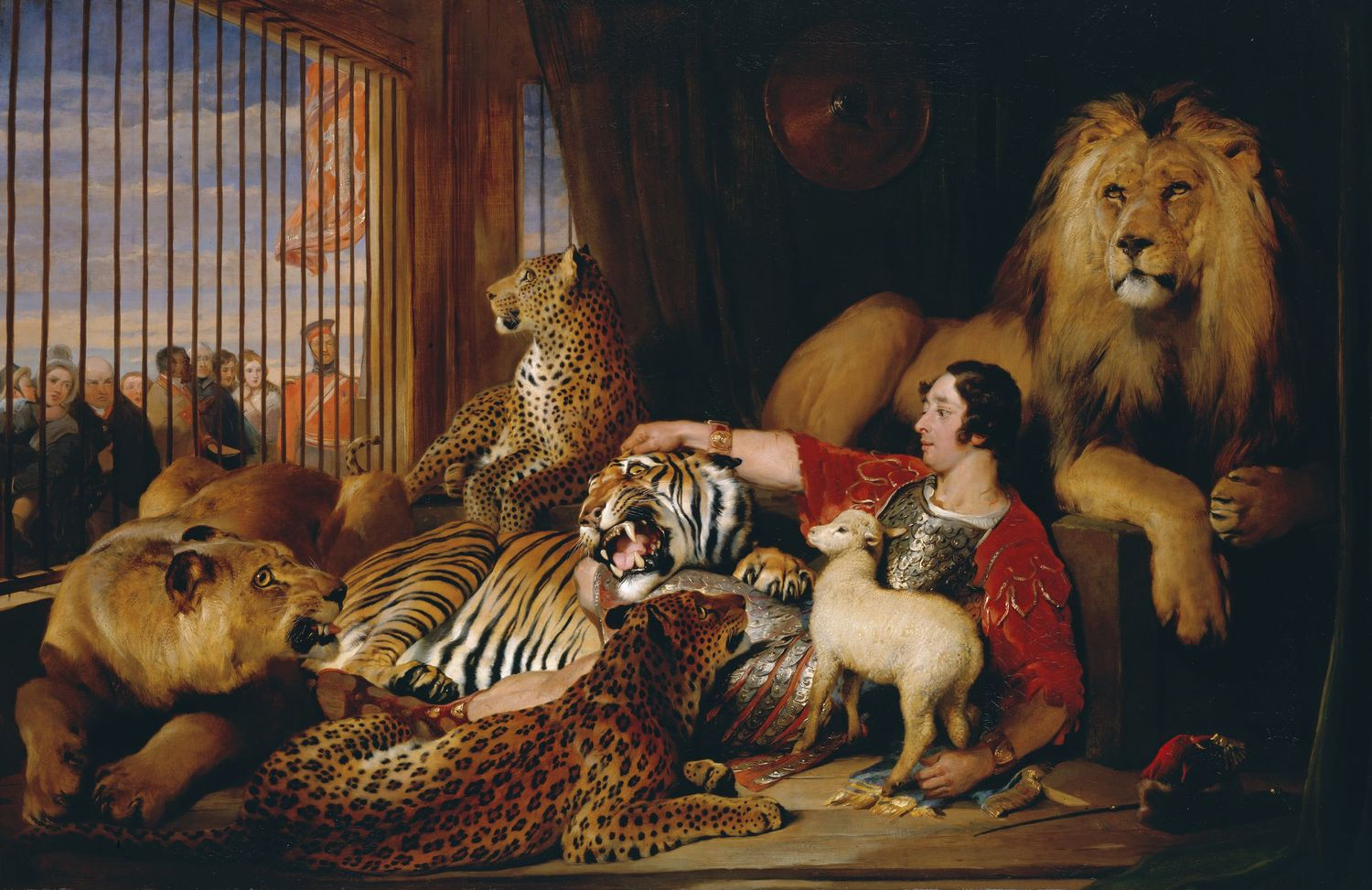
Isaac van Amburgh with his Animals by Sir Edwin Henry Landseer, 1839

In the late 1830s, Van Amburgh took his act to England and Europe for several years. He made his debut in London at Astley's on August 27, 1838, and is said to have made £300 per week there.

While in England, Van Amburgh performed for Queen Victoria and Prince Albert in 1844. The former took special interest in him. In fact, the Queen commissioned artist Edwin Landseer to paint a portrait of Van Amburgh and his cats. Upon its completion, the painting was exhibited at the Royal Academy, an impressive honor for the time.

In 1839, Queen Victoria traveled six times in as many months solely to watch Van Amburgh perform at Drury Lane. She even remained after one evening's performance in order to watch his feeding the cats. Even before his 1838 European debut, Van Amburgh was one of America's most celebrated characters. But after such special royal favor, Van Amburgh "became a figure that even the American upper crust could admit to appreciating." He was the first major American wild animal trainer to achieve such an international celebrity status.

== Criticisms ==
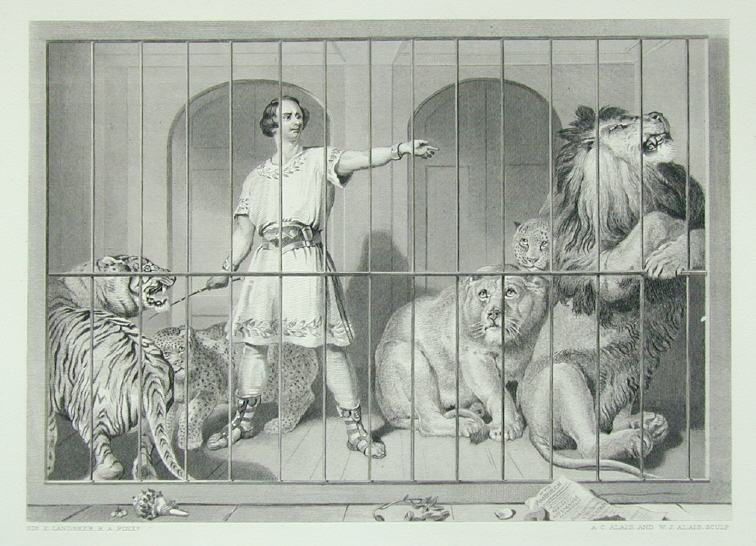
Van Amburgh in the Wild Cat Cage

Circuses were regularly under attack in the press and at the pulpit as "traveling death" and "moral ruin." But predecessors of Van Amburgh were less inhumane. Despite his great success and popularity, Van Amburgh regularly faced criticism for the cruelty he showed to his animals. Van Amburgh reportedly beat his animals with a crowbar. In costume, whether in loose-fitting jungle clothing or ancient Roman gladiatorial garb, Van Amburgh would bait the animals, attempting to evoke as much ferocity on their part as he could. Thereupon, he would beat them into submission. "His pièce de résistance was forcing the lions to ... lick his boots as the ultimate sign of his conquest and the animals' abject subservience." Van Amburgh's own publicity agent, Hyat Frost, reported that Van Amburgh starved his lions for three days before one of these royal command performances. They were so hungry when it came time to perform that he was forced to "lash them furiously with his whip 'into the most abject and crouching submission.'"

In response to these attacks, Van Amburgh cited Bible verses to justify his touring menagerie. He quoted Genesis 1:26, arguing that God had given men dominion over animals. Thus "it was a religious act for trained animals to kneel at his feet." He is also well-remembered for having acted out a scene from the Bible by forcing a lion and a lamb to lie down together and even inviting a child from the audience into the den.

== Death and legacy ==
In August 1838, the editor of the Age reported that "there have already been several cases in which lions have snapped off the heads of persons persisting in this sort of foolish experiment." Van Amburgh, however, was one of the few early lion tamers who died in bed. On November 29, 1865, at age fifty-four, Isaac A. Van Amburgh suffered a fatal heart attack in Philadelphia. He died a very wealthy man.

Even after Van Amburgh's death, Hyatt Frost, his manager since 1865, continued using the Van Amburgh name. From him it was leased by the Ringling Brothers in 1889.

Van Amburgh himself lived to hear his deeds put to a popular song, "The Menagerie." Dr. W. J. Wetmore, M.D., published "Van Amburgh's Menagerie" in 1865, which began like this:

Van Amburgh is the man, who goes to all the shows

He goes into the lion's cage, and tells you all he knows;

He sticks his head in the lion's mouth, and keeps it there a-while,

And when he pulls it out again, he greets you with a smile.

chorus:

The elephant now moves round, the music begins to play.

Them boys around the monkey's cage had better keep away

== See also ==
- Lion taming

== Sources ==
- Bunyan, Patrick (1999), All Around the Town: Amazing Manhattan Facts and Curiosities.
- Central Michigan University, Mount Pleasant, Mich. 48859, January 13, 2011 http://clarke.cmich.edu/resource_tab/information_and_exhibits/rides_and_spangles_michigan_circuses_and_carnivals/lion_tamers.html
- "Circus in America" © to Lavahn G. Hoh and the University of Virginia, 2004 http://www.circusinamerica.org/public/timelines?date1=1825&date2=1871
- Culhane, John. The American Circus, Henry Holt and Company, Inc., 1990
- Ferguson, O. J. Biographical Sketch of I. A. Van Amburgh. Booth & Co., 1865
- Hawthorne, Nathaniel. Passages from the American Note-Books of Nathaniel Hawthorne. Bowstn: Houghton, Mifflin, 1898. Entry for September 4, 1838.
- History Magazine, "Step Right Up," October/November 2001 issue http://www.history-magazine.com/circuses.html
- Horne, Richard. The Life of Van Amburgh, the Brute-Tamer: with Anecdotes of His Extraordinary Pupils. Machen and Company, Dublin, 1838.
- Johnson, William M., The Rose-Tinted Menagerie (http://www.iridescent-publishing.com/rtm/ch1p3.htm)
- Thayer, Stuart. American Circus Anthology, Essays of the Early Years, arranged and edited by William L. Slout. Copyright © 2005 by Stuart Thayer and William L. Slout. All rights reserved. http://www.circushistory.org/Thayer/Thayer2c.htm
