= The Sonnet =

Painting by William Mulready

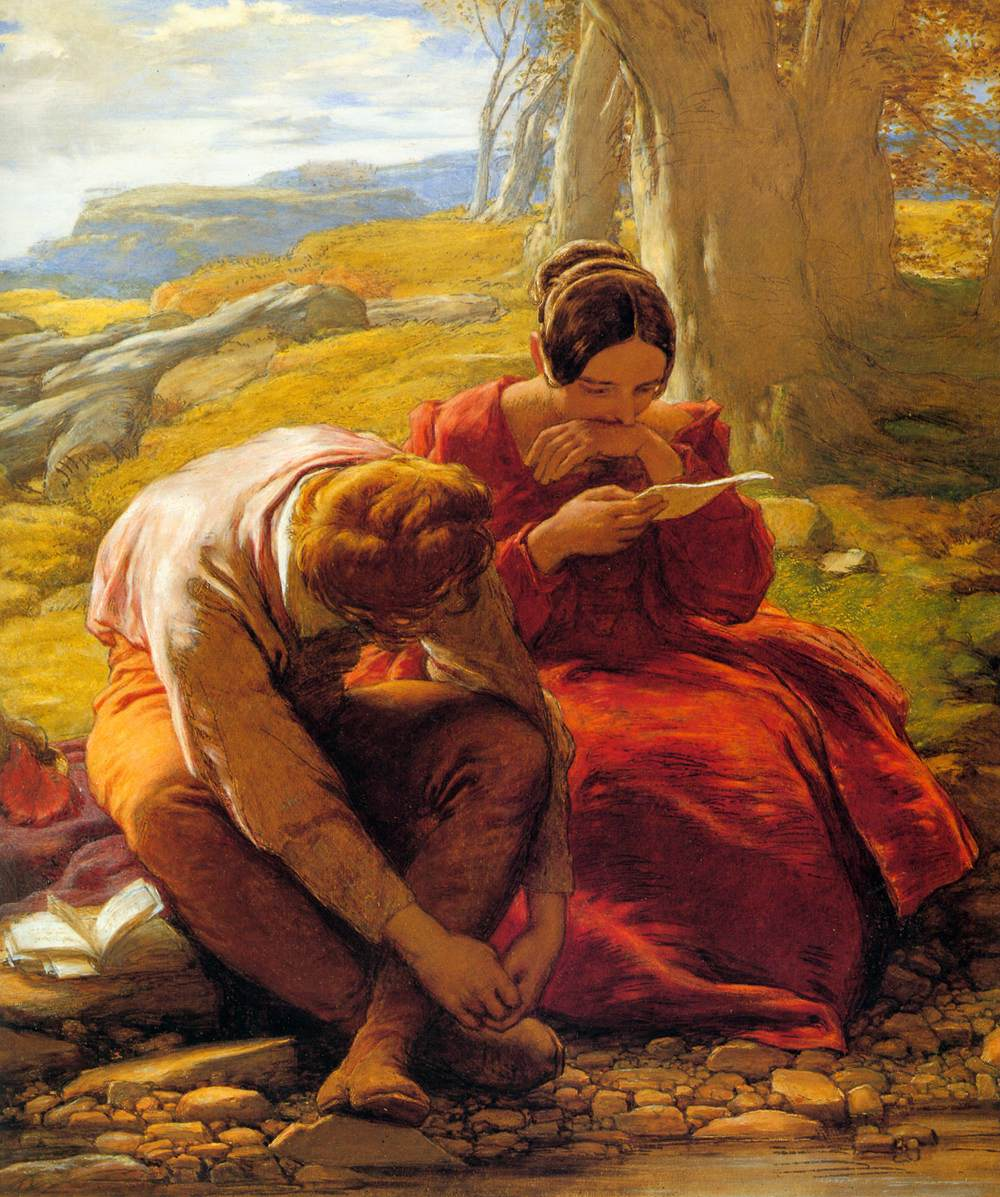
- Artist: William Mulready
- Year: 1839
- Type: Oil on panel, genre painting
- Dimensions: 36 cm × 31 cm (14 in × 12 in)
- Location: Victoria and Albert Museum, London

The Sonnet is an oil on panel genre painting by the Irish artist William Mulready, from 1839. It depicts a scene in rural England featuring a courting couple. The young man sits self-consciously while his companion reacts with naive delight as she reads the romantic sonnet he has written in her honour.

The painting was displayed at the Royal Academy Exhibition of 1839 at the National Gallery in London. Today it is part of the collection of the Victoria and Albert Museum in South Kensington, having been given as part of Sheepshanks Gift by the art collector John Sheepshanks in 1857.

== Bibliography ==
- Bermingham, Ann. Landscape and Ideology: The English Rustic Tradition, 1740-1860. University of California Press, 1989.
- Roe, Sonia. Oil Paintings in Public Ownership in the Victoria and Albert Museum. Public Catalogue Foundation, 2008.
- Wright, Christopher, Gordon, Catherine May & Smith, Mary Peskett. British and Irish Paintings in Public Collections: An Index of British and Irish Oil Paintings by Artists Born Before 1870 in Public and Institutional Collections in the United Kingdom and Ireland. Yale University Press, 2006.
