= Isaac van Amburgh and his Animals =

Painting by Edwin Landseer

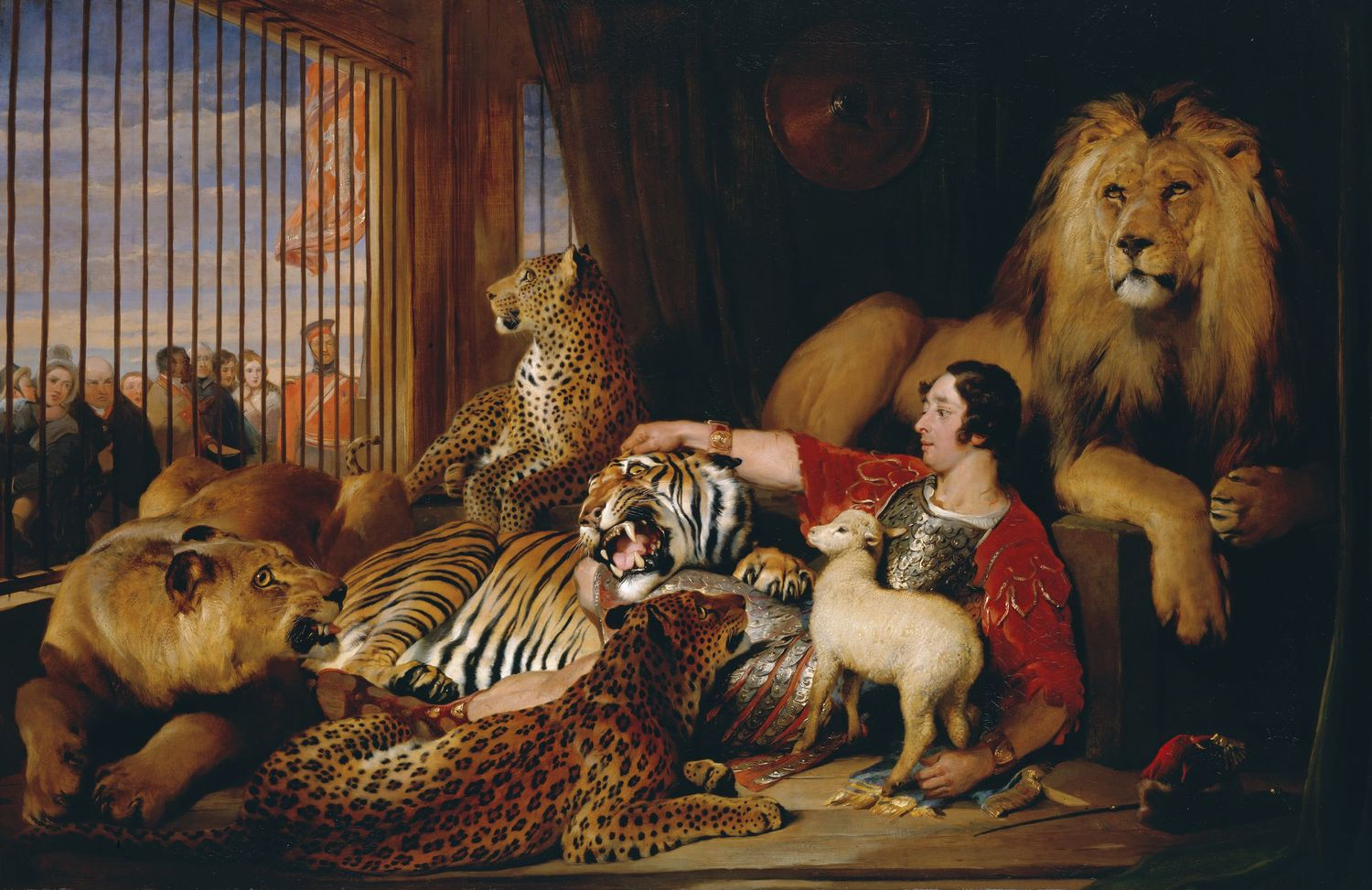
- Artist: Edwin Landseer
- Year: 1839
- Type: Oil on canvas, portrait painting
- Dimensions: 113.7 cm × 174.8 cm (44.8 in × 68.8 in)
- Location: Windsor Castle, Windsor

Isaac van Amburgh and his Animals is an 1839 portrait painting by the British artist Edwin Landseer. It shows the American animal trainer Isaac A. Van Amburgh. Van Amburgh enjoyed great success performing in London in the late 1830s at locations like the Theatre Royal, Drury Lane and Astley's Amphitheatre. He is shown surrounded by lions and other animals in a cage with spectators peering through the bars. It was one of the earliest commissions for Landseer from Queen Victoria. He was one her favourite painters and would produce works for her for several decades. The painting was displayed at the Royal Academy Exhibition of 1839 at the National Gallery. It remains in the Royal Collection today at Windsor Castle.

== Bibliography ==
- Donald, Diana. Picturing Animals in Britain, 1750–1850. Yale University Press, 2007.
- Koenigsberger, Kurt. The Novel and the Menagerie: Totality, Englishness, and Empire. Ohio State University Press, 2007.
- Ormond, Richard. Sir Edwin Landseer. Philadelphia Museum of Art, 1981.
