= John Stevens (translator) =

English captain, Hispanist and translator

John Stevens (c. 1662 – 1726) was an English captain, Hispanist and translator. He is known for his translation of Don Quixote in 1700.

== Life ==
Stevens was born in London, where his father was a page to Catherine of Braganza, and was educated by Benedictines at Douai, around 1675. He was bilingual, speaking Spanish from infancy, presumably with his mother. He served in the forces sent to quell Monmouth's Rebellion, and went with Henry Hyde, 2nd Earl of Clarendon to Dublin in 1685. He then through the Hyde connection became a tax official at Welshpool. English catholic and Jacobite, he fought in the Irish Williamite War and was at the siege of Limerick. He kept a diary of the conflict.

Before 1695 Stevens had settled again in London. From that time till his death he was engaged in translations, and historical and antiquarian compilations. He was editor of the British Mercury from 1712 to 1715. He died on 27 October 1726.

== Works ==
Stevens's first publication, an abridged translation in three volumes of Manuel de Faria y Sousa's Portuguesa Asia, appeared in 1695, with a dedication to Catharine of Braganza. In 1698 he produced a translation and continuation from 1640 of the same author's History of Portugal. His English version of Don Francisco Manuel de Mello's The Government of a Wife was issued in 1697. It was dedicated to Don Luis da Cunha, the Portuguese envoy. In the same year, Stevens published a version of Quevedo's Fortune in her Wits, or the Hour of all Men. He issued in 1707 a translation of the collected comedies of Quevedo, which was republished in 1709 and in 1742. A collection of Spanish works translated and adapted by him appeared in the same year under the title of The Spanish Libertines. It consisted of Andrés Pérez de León's Justina, the Country Jilt (sometimes attributed to Francisco López de Ubeda); Celestina, the Bawd of Madrid, by Fernando de Rojas; Gonzales, the Most Arch and Comical of Scoundrels; and Juan de Ávila's comedy, An Evening's Intrigue, adapted by the translator.

Stevens tried a revision of Thomas Shelton's English version of Don Quixote (second edition London, 1706, in 2 vols). It was dedicated to Sir Thomas Hanmer, and was illustrated by copperplates engraved from the Brussels edition. Stevens also translated in 1705 the so-called continuation of Don Quixote made by Alonso Fernández de Avellaneda, which had not before appeared in English. The version was prepared from a previous French translation attributed (perhaps spuriously) to Le Sage.

A rendering by Stevens of Quevedo's Pablo de Segovia the Spanish Sharper formed the basis of the Edinburgh version of 1798, and was reprinted in vol. ii of The Romancist and Novelist's Library, edited by W. C. Hazlitt, in 1841. Henry Edward Watts used it for his edition of 1892. Stevens also translated from the Spanish works of history and travel, as well as Quintana's The most Entertaining History of Hippolyto and Aminta, 2nd edit. 1729. His rendering of Mariana's History of Spain appeared in 1699; and of Sandoval's History of Charles V in 1703. In 1715 he translated Texeira's Spanish version of Mírkhánd's History of Persia. His translation of Herrera's General History of the Vast Continent and Islands of America, commonly called the West Indies, issued in 6 vols. 1725–1726, and reprinted in 1740, was a free version. From Spanish authors, Stevens also mainly compiled his New Collection of Voyages and Travels, published in two volumes in 1711 (it originally appeared in monthly parts), and republished in 1719.

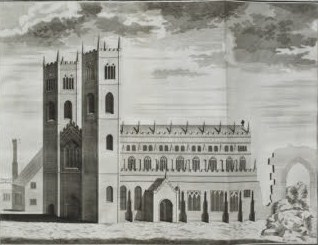
Worksop Priory, engraving from Antient Abbeys (1722)

Stevens was also an antiquary. In 1718 he published anonymously a translation and abridgement of William Dugdale's Monasticon Anglicanum. In 1722 he published a continuation of the Monasticon in two volumes, as The History of the Antient Abbeys, Monasteries, Hospitals, Cathedrals, &c., illustrated with copperplates (and with additions from Hugh Todd). As a further continuation of the Monasticon Anglicanum Stevens issued anonymously in 1722, his Monasticon Hibernicum (a translation, with additions and alterations, of Louis Augustin Alémand's Histoire Monastique d'Irlande 1690). Stevens also translated Bede's Historia ecclesiastica gentis Anglorum. The rendering is very literal; some of the notes were used in William Hurst's version, published in 1814. Stevens's translation formed the basis of that of John Allen Giles (1840), and of that issued in Bohn's Antiquarian Library (1847).

From the French Stevens translated in 1712 for Bernard Lintot parts of "Dupin", probably Louis Ellies Dupin's Bibliothèque Universelle des Historiens; and Book iii of P. J. D'Orléans's Histoire des Révolutions en Angleterre sous la Famille des Stuarts, 1722.

Stevens also compiled:

- A Brief History of Spain, 1701.
- The Ancient and Present State of Portugal, 1701, (based on Faria y Sousa's Europa Portuguesa).
- The Lives and Actions of all the Sovereigns of Bavaria, 1706.
- A Spanish–English and English–Spanish Dictionary, with Grammar, 1706; 1726.
- The Royal Treasury of England; or an Historical Account of Taxes, 1725; 2nd edit., 1733.

Stevens left manuscripts, which were purchased from his widow by John Warburton.

== Selected translations ==
- History of the most ingenious knight Don Quixote de la Mancha. (London: R. Chiswell, 1700). Translation from Cervantes' Don Quixote.
- Continuation of the comical history of the most ingenious knight, Don Quixote de la Mancha, by the licentiate Alonzo Fernandez de Avellaneda. Being a third volume; never before printed in English. Illustrated with several curious copper cuts.(London: J. Wale and J. Senex, 1705). Translation of Avellaneda's apocryphal continuation of Don Quixote, from the French.
- General history of Spain...written in Spanish by the R. F. F. John de Mariana... (London: Sare, Saunders and Bennet, 1699). Translation of the Historia General de España of Juan de Mariana, with addenda by Camargo and Varen de Soto.
- Fortune in her wits, or, The hour of all (London: Sare, Saunders and Bennet, 1697). Translation of La hora de todos y la Fortuna con seso of Francisco de Quevedo.
- Choice humorous and satirical works. Translation of satirical and humour works by Francisco de Quevedo.
- Pleasant history of the life and actions of Paul, the Spanish sharper, the patterns of rogues and mirror of vagabonds. Translation of Francisco de Quevedo's Buscón.
- The Spanish Libertines: or, the lives of Justina, the Country Jilt, Celestina, the bawd of Madrid and Estebanillo Gonzales, the most arch and comical of scoundrels (written by himself). To which is added, a play (in five acts and in prose) call'd An Evening's Adventures (by J. de Avila). All four written by eminent Spanish authors, and now first made English by Captain J. S. (London: 1707). Translation of Estebanillo González, La Pícara Justina, La Celestina, etc.
- History of Charles the Vth, emperor and king of Spain, the great hero of the house of Austria. Translation of the Historia del Emperador Carlos V by Fray Prudencio de Sandoval.
