= Francisco de Robles =

Spanish publisher and bookseller

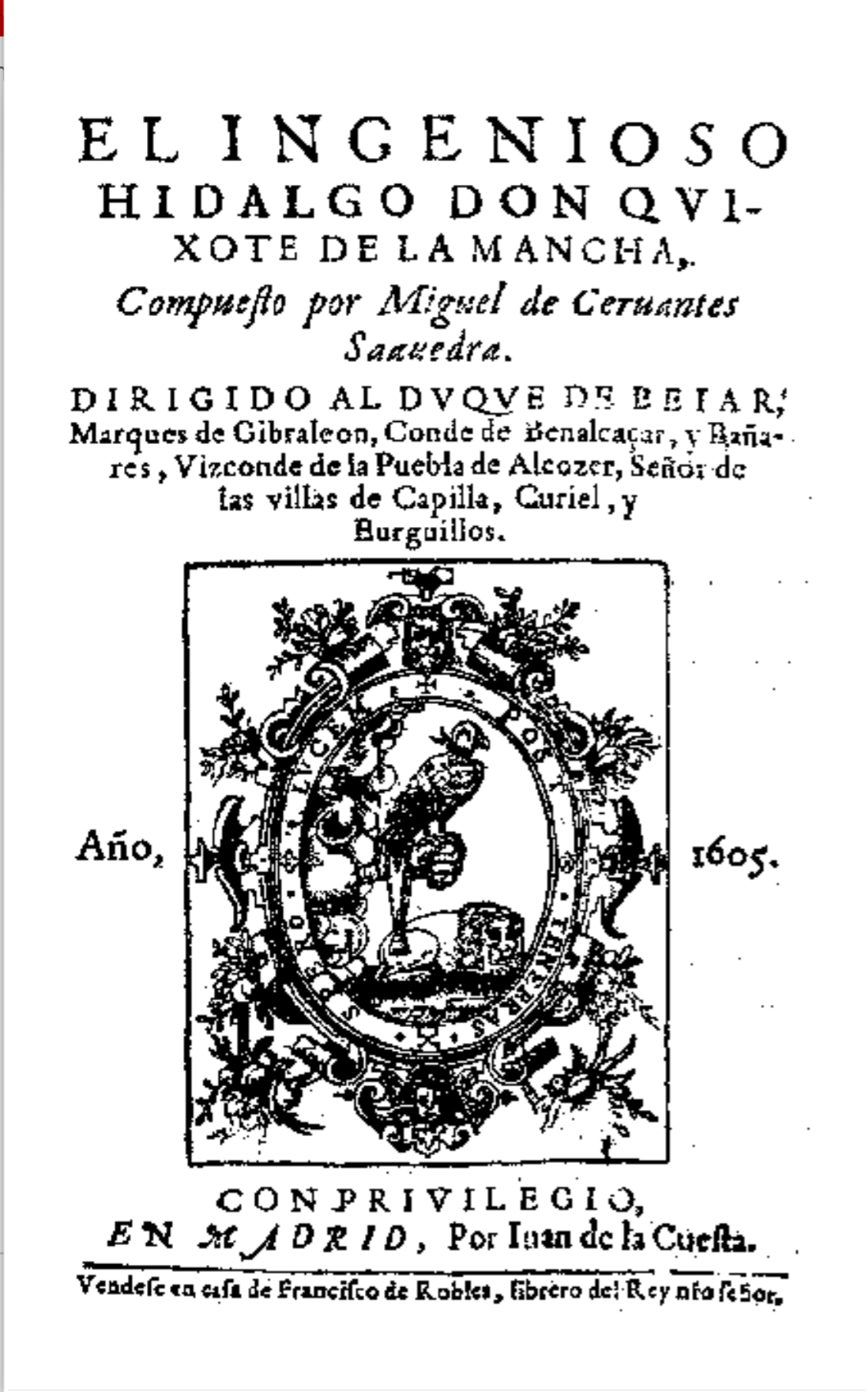
The title page of the first (1605) edition of Cervantes' Don Quijote

Francisco de Robles was a bookseller in Madrid, whose shop was near the Puerta de Guadalajara. He was also a publisher; among his books are the first editions of Don Quixote (1605) and the Exemplary Novels (1613), by Miguel de Cervantes. Robles contracted with the printer Juan de la Cuesta to print Don Quijote in his shop at Atocha 87, in Madrid, which is today a museum and cultural center, and home of the Sociedad Cervantina.

Robles was godfather of Cuesta's two children.

Before moving to Madrid, his father, Blas de Robles, had published Cervantes' La Galatea in 1585 in nearby Alcalá de Henares, after paying Cervantes 336 reales for its copyright (privilegio).
