= La Galatea =

Book by Miguel de Cervantes

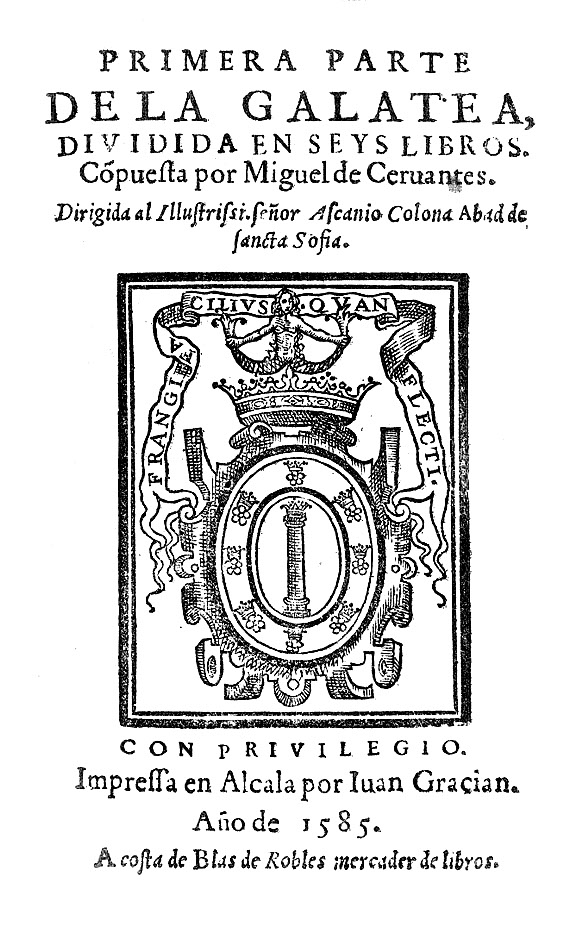
- Author: Miguel de Cervantes Saavedra
- Language: Spanish
- Genre: Pastoral novel
- Publisher: Blas de Robles
- Publication date: 1585
- Publication place: Spain
- Media type: Print (Hardback & Paperback)
- Pages: 375 folios
- Word count: 119,945

La Galatea (Spanish pronunciation: [la ɣalaˈte.a]) was Miguel de Cervantes’ first book, published in 1585. Under the guise of pastoral characters, it is an examination of love and contains many allusions to contemporary literary figures. It enjoyed modest success, but was not soon reprinted; its promised sequel was never published.

== Plot ==
The main characters of the Galatea are Elicio and Erastro, best friends and both in love with Galatea. The novel opens with her and her best friend, Florisa, bathing, and talking of love. Erastro and Elicio reveal to each other their desire for Galatea, but agree not to let it come between their friendship. Eventually, all four of them begin their journey to the wedding of Daranio and Silveria, along which, in the pastoral tradition, they encounter other characters who tell their own stories and often join the traveling group.

The vast majority of the characters in the book are involved primarily in minor story lines. Lisandro loses his love, Leonida, when Crisalvo mistakenly kills her instead of his former love Silvia. Lisandro avenges Leonida's death in the presence of the main party. Astor, under the pseudonym Silerio, feigns attraction for Nísida's sister Blanca to avoid the scorn of Nísida's lover Timbrio, who dies following the confusion present after a successful duel against his rival Pransiles. Astor's grief thrusts him into hermitage, waiting to hear from Nísida. Arsindo holds a poetry competition betwixt Francenio and Lauso, which is judged by Tirsi and Damón, lauded by many within the novel as some of the most famous poets of Spain. The competition is determined to have no single winner. The wedding has controversy as Mireno is deeply in love with Silveria, yet Daranio's wealth guaranteed him the hand of Silveria.

These stories sometimes have characters that cross over, resulting in the sub-plots being intertwined at times. For example, Teolinda, whose sister Leonida played in an integral role in separating Teolinda from her lover Artidoro, finds Leonida much later with a group of soldiers. The fame of Tirsi and Damón instantly connects them with the hired wedding bards, Orompo, Crisio, Marsilio, and Orfenio, as well as the teacher Arsindo.

== Analysis ==
La Galatea is an imitation of the Diana of Jorge de Montemayor, and shows an even greater resemblance to Gaspar Gil Polo's continuation of the Diana. Next to Don Quixote and the Novelas exemplares, his pastoral romance is considered particularly notable because it predicts the poetic direction in which Cervantes would go for the rest of his career. It possesses little originality, but is highly reminiscent of its models, and particularly of the Diana of Gil Polo. The name Galatea, as well as the format of a pastoral involving two characters competing over a girl, is an imitation of Virgil's Eclogues and the related classical pastoral material which Virgil himself drew from.

In composing this pastoral romance, Cervantes seems to have intended to use the tale merely as an excuse for a rich collection of poems in the old Spanish and Italian styles. The story is merely the thread, which holds the beautiful garland together; the poems are the portion most deserving of attention. They are many and various, and uphold Cervantes' claim to rank among the most eminent poets, whether in reference to verse or to prose. Should his originality in versified composition be called in question, a close study of Galatea must banish all doubt.

Although some contemporaries of Cervantes decried the quality of his dramatic works, when compared to those of Lope de Vega. the same is not true of his lyrical compositions. One contemporary, Luis Gálvez de Montalvo, in his 1582 novel, El pastor de Fílida, urges Cervantes to complete it. From the romance of Galatea, Cervantes composed in all the various kinds of syllabic measure used in his time. He even occasionally adopted the old dactylic stanza. He appears to have experienced some difficulty with the metrical form of the sonnet, but his poems in Italian octaves display great facility. Among these, the song of Caliope, in the last book of the Galatea, stands out.

In the same manner as Gil Polo did in his Diana, Cervantes makes the river Turia pronounce the praises of the celebrated Valencians. He summons the muse Calliope before the shepherds and shepherdesses, to render homage to those contemporaries whom he esteems worthy of distinction as poets. The most widely admired poems in the Galatea are a few in the cancion style. Some of which are iambics, and some in trochaic or Old Spanish verse. Cervante indulged in those antiquated and fantastic plays of wit, which at a subsequent period he himself ridiculed.

=== Themes ===
Upbringings and life-styles
One of the primary treatments in the Galatea, and most evident in the contrast between Elicio and Erastro, is the perception of rural and city folk and their lives. Elicio, a cultured shepherd, and Erastro, a rústico ganadero (rustic herdsman) are an odd pair of friends, and throughout the novel their differing views come out in conversations with other characters. Erastro, though from the rural parts of Spain, is very eloquent in speech—a trait that surprises many. However, because of his background, Erastro feels disadvantaged in his desire for Galatea, who had a very cultured upbringing similar to Elicio’s. A similar discussion ensues when a group of soldiers meets the group and one of them, Darinto, describes his view of pastoral (or rural) life as being a simple one, without all the complications, formalities and expenses of city life. Damón replies that the rural life is not as glorious or desirable as Darinto imagines: there are just as many chores and other things to do in country life as in city life, and so is not the relaxing simple life described.
Friendship
Love, affection, and desire

== Second part ==
The original title published with the work now simply known as the Galatea was La primera parte de la Galatea (The First Part of the Galatea).

Cervantes indicated on numerous occasions during his life he planned to publish a second part, even in the ending of the first part:

El fin deste amoroso cuento y historia […] con otras cosas sucedidas a los pastores hasta aquí nombrados, en la segunda parte desta historia se prometen, la cual, si con apacibles voluntades esta primera viene rescibida, tendrá atrevimiento de salir con brevedad a ser vista y juzgada de los ojos y entendimiento de las gentes.

The end of the loving story […] with other matters which happened to the swains herein enumerated, are promised in the second part, which, if with a cheerful recognition this first part is received, it will embolden the author to submit for judgment, to the eyes and intelligence of the public, the sequel.

— Miguel de Cervantes Saavedra, La Galatea, book VI

In Cervantes' later novel, Don Quixote, La Galatea appears in the book burning scene. Its worth is measured as satisfactory in itself, but both the Barber and Curate agree the plot matters little without a Second Part. The Galatea enjoyed moderate success, but any work that Cervantes may have begun on a conclusion was lost to history following his death.

== In other media ==
The book is used in the Starz series, Black Sails. In the third episode of the second season, Captain Flint leaves a copy of La Galatea at the doorstep of his close friend, Miranda Barlow.

The book appears in Don Quixote by the same author.
