= Quixotism =

Impractical idealism

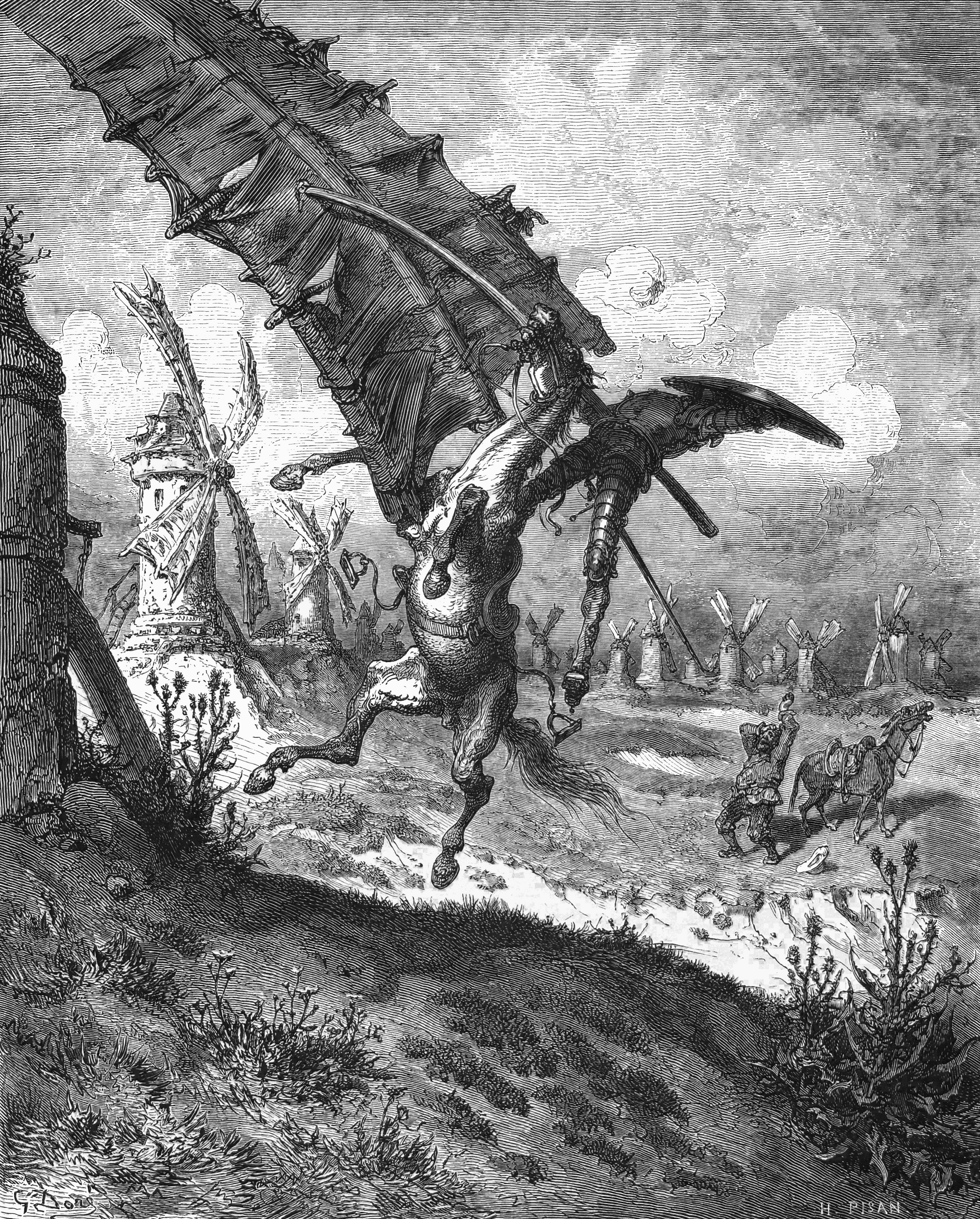
Illustration by Gustave Doré depicting the windmill scene of Don Quixote, in which the hero fights with windmills, which he imagines to be giants.

Quixotism (/kwɪkˈsɒtɪzəm/ or /kiːˈhoʊtɪzəm/; adj. quixotic) is impracticality in pursuit of ideals, especially those ideals manifested by rash, lofty and romantic ideas or extravagantly chivalrous action. It also serves to describe an idealism without regard to practicality. An impulsive person or act might be regarded as quixotic.

Quixotism is usually related to "over-idealism", meaning an idealism that does not take consequence or absurdity into account. It is also related to naïve romanticism and to utopianism.

== Origin ==
Quixotism as a term or a quality appeared after the publication of Don Quixote in 1605. Don Quixote, the main protagonist of this novel, written by Spanish author Miguel de Cervantes Saavedra, dreams up a romantic ideal world which he believes to be real, and acts on this idealism, which leads him into imaginary fights with windmills that he regards as giants, leading to the related metaphor of "tilting at windmills".

In the 17th century, the term quixote was used to describe a person who does not distinguish between reality and imagination. The poet John Cleveland wrote in 1644, in his book The Character of a London Diurnall:

The Quixotes of this Age fight with the Wind-mills of their owne Heads.

The word quixotism is mentioned, for the first time, in Pulpit Popery, True Popery (1688):

...all the Heroical Fictions of Ecclesiastical Quixotism...

Spanish language opposes quijotesco ('Quixotic') with sanchopancesco ('lacking idealism, accommodating and chuckling' after Sancho Panza).

== In practice ==
Aaron R Hanlon draws parallels with Don Quixote's internal storytelling and voter psychology in the 2016 United States presidential election. Like Quixote, who Hanlon says "has a way of severing rationality from fact", both urban progressives and rural Americans are susceptible to a kind of quixotism. For Hanlon, this is why fact-checking Donald Trump's electoral claims proves futile, as "facts have never been enough to unite discordant narratives about the way things are". Instead, he emphasises the need to pay closer attention to the impact of stories.

== See also ==
- Chūnibyō
