= Thomas Shelton (translator) =

17th-century Irish translator

Thomas Shelton (fl. 1604–1620) was a translator of Don Quixote from Spanish into English. Shelton's translation of the first part of the novel was published in London in 1612. It was the first translation of Don Quixote into any language. Shelton published his complete translation of the novel in 1620.

== Life ==
Shelton was a Roman Catholic from Dublin. He may have been educated in Spain, where a "Thomas Shelton, Dublinensis" was listed as a student in Salamanca.

Shelton's activities in Ireland brought him to the attention of the English intelligence service. He seems to have been employed in carrying letters to persons in England from Lord Deputy Fitzwilliam at Dublin Castle. However, evidence emerged that he was hostile to the English crown: a letter was intercepted in which he offered his services to Florence MacCarthy, who was seeking to arrange a military intervention by the king of Spain—the Spanish sent an expedition to Kinsale, Ireland in 1601.

In 1600 a spy reported that Shelton and one Richard Nugent were at the headquarters of the Irish rebel Tyrone. Shelton and Nugent were reported to be planning to travel to Scotland, but they changed their destination to Spain. Whether they arrived in Spain is not clear as they both ended up in Flanders. Nugent was to claim he left Ireland because he was neglected in love, publishing Cynthia, containing direful sonnets, madrigalls and passionate intercourses, describing his repudiate affections expressed in loves owne language.

Shelton's dedication of his major literary work to Theophilus Howard has led to speculation as to the connection between them. The Oxford Dictionary of National Biography suggests they could have met in the Low Countries in 1610. Another suggestion is that the connection was via Lady Suffolk, Theophilus' mother. According to Alexander T. Wright, in a paper published in October 1898, Lady Suffolk had three relatives bearing the name Thomas Shelton, and the author may therefore have been related. Moreover, Lady Suffolk received money from the King of Spain on the recommendation of the Spanish ambassador. She was of interest to the Spanish because of her perceived influence on the Earl of Salisbury.

Shelton at one time hoped to obtain a pardon from the English authorities, but so far as is known spent his final years on the continent where he became a Franciscan.

The life of Thomas Shelton inspired the biographical novel Behind the Tapestry by Lenny McGee, now translated and published in Italian as Dietro l'arazzo by Coazinzola Press.

== Publications ==
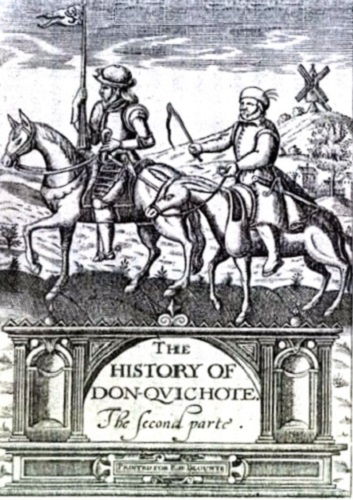
Illustration from Thomas Shelton's translation of the second part of Don Quixote, which appeared in 1620

Shelton's first publication was a poem in Cynthia (London 1604), a book of lyric verse mentioned above in which the author, Nugent, included several pieces by his friends. Shelton wrote a sonnet prefixed to the Restitution of Decayed Intelligence (Antwerp 1605) of Richard Verstegan.

=== The Quixote translation ===
In the dedication of The History of the Valorous and Wittie Knight-Errant Don-Quixote of the Mancha (1612) he explains to his patron, Lord Howard de Walden, afterwards 2nd Earl of Suffolk, that he "Translated some five or six yeares agoe, The Historie of Don-Quixote, out of the Spanish tongue, into the English ... in the space of forty daies: being therunto more than half enforced, through the importunitie of a very deere friend, that was desirous to understand the subject."

As source, Shelton did not use either of the authorized 1605 editions of the First Part of Cervantes' masterpiece, but an edition published in Brussels, in the Spanish Netherlands, in 1607. Shelton's translation of the First Part of the novel was published while Cervantes was still alive. On the appearance of the Brussels imprint of the Second Part of Don Quixote in 1616, the year of Cervantes's death, Shelton translated that also into English, completing his task in 1620, and printing at the same time a revised edition of the First Part.

His performance has become a classic among English translations for its racy, spirited rendering of the original, but was faulted by translators such as John Ormsby (who had a fondness for it), for being so literal that certain words and phrases are completely mistranslated. ("Gustos", for example, means "delights" or "likings", but Shelton renders it as "gusts", and "dedos", which literally means "fingers", is rendered as such by Shelton, although the word can also mean "inches", which is the way Cervantes intends it.) Ormsby states, in his introduction to his own 1885 translation, that Shelton failed to recognize that a Spanish word can have more than one shade of meaning, and accuses Shelton of not having had a good knowledge of Spanish. In his introduction to the Tudor Translations (1896) reprint of Shelton's translations, James Fitzmaurice-Kelly sees the performance otherwise: "Shelton's title to remembrance is based upon the broadest grounds. He had no sympathy for the arid accuracy that juggles with a gerund or toys with the crabbed subjunctive. From the subtleties of syntax, as from the bonds of prosody he sallies free; and the owls of pedantry have bitterly resented his arrogant disdain for them and theirs. And they have sought to avenge themselves, after their manner, by reproaching him with taking a disjunctive for an interjection, and with confounding of predicate and subject. They act after their kind. But Shelton's view of his function was ampler and nobler than the hidebound grammarian's. He appeals to the pure lover of literature; and as a man of letters he survives."

Both parts of Shelton's Don Quixote are available in Fitzmaurice-Kelly's 4-volume reprint for the Tudor Translations (1896), which itself was reprinted by AMS Press in 1967, and the First Part was also included in the famous Harvard Classics; the translation of the complete novel is reproduced in Macmillan's "Library of English Classics" with an introduction by A. W. Pollard, who incorporates the suggestions made by A. T. Wright in his Thomas Shelton, Translator.
