= Don Quixote =

1605–1615 novel by Miguel de Cervantes

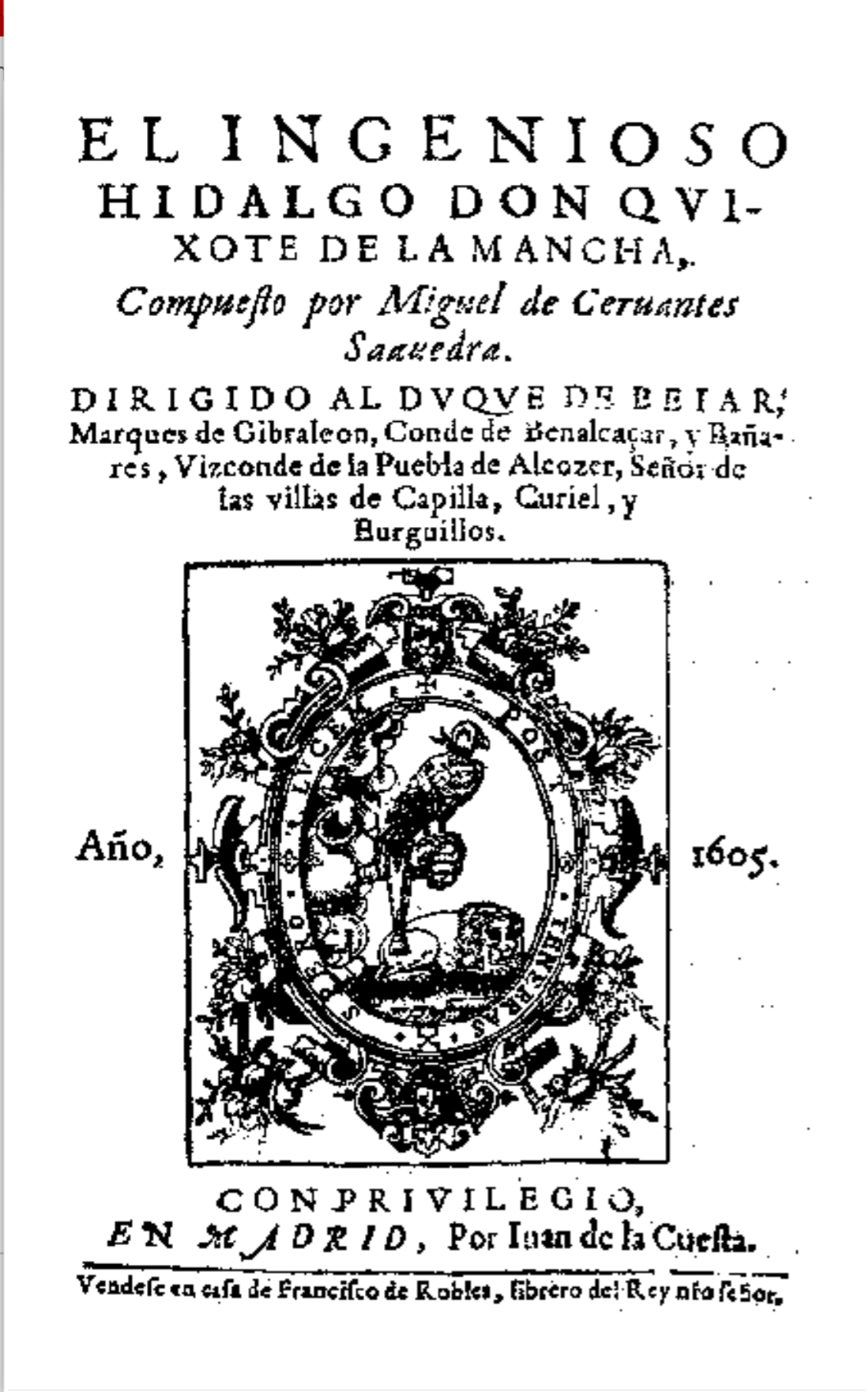
- Don Quijote de la Mancha, first edition, 1605, printed by Juan de la Cuesta
- Author: Miguel de Cervantes
- Original title: El ingenioso hidalgo don Quijote de la Mancha
- Language: Early Modern Spanish
- Genre: Novel
- Publisher: Francisco de Robles
- Publication date: 1605 (Part One); 1615 (Part Two)
- Publication place: Habsburg Spain
- English publication date: 1612 (Part One); 1620 (Part Two)
- Media type: Print
- Dewey Decimal: 863
- LC Class: PQ6323
- Original text: El ingenioso hidalgo don Quijote de la Mancha at Spanish Wikisource
- Translation: Don Quixote at Wikisource

Don Quixote (Note: Titled The Ingenious Gentleman Don Quixote of La Mancha in full. The original title in Early Modern Spanish is El ingenioso hidalgo don Quixote de la Mancha. "Quixote" is spelled "Quijote" in modern Spanish and pronounced [kiˈxote].) is a novel by Miguel de Cervantes, written in Early Modern Spanish and published in two parts in 1605 and 1615. It is considered a founding work of Western literature and the first modern novel. Don Quixote is one of the most-translated books in the world and one of the best-selling books in history.

The plot revolves around the adventures of a member of the lowest nobility, a hidalgo (Note: Although in popular usage, the term identifies a nobleman or woman, hidalga, without a hereditary title, the reality of the hidalguía, that is, the condition of hidalgo or hidalga, was, in practice, much more complex. Among other aspects, although not usually great landowners, hidalgos were exempted from paying taxes.) from La Mancha named Alonso Quijano, who reads so many chivalric romances that he decides to become a knight-errant (caballero andante) to revive chivalry and serve his nation, under the name Don Quixote de la Mancha. (Note: The modern-day spelling of Quixote in Spanish is Quijote.) He recruits as his squire a simple farm labourer, Sancho Panza, who brings an earthy wit to Don Quixote's lofty rhetoric. In the first part of the book, Don Quixote does not see the world for what it is and prefers to imagine that he is living out a knightly story meant for the annals of all time. As Salvador de Madariaga pointed out in his Guía del lector del Quijote (1972 [1926]), opposing Quixotization with Sanchification, "Sancho's spirit ascends from reality to illusion" while Don Quixote's does the opposite.

The book had a major influence on the literary community, being directly referenced in works of 19th‑century French literature such as Alexandre Dumas's The Three Musketeers (1844) and Edmond Rostand's Cyrano de Bergerac (1897). Even the word quixotic ('impractically idealistic') became part of language. Mark Twain referred to Don Quixote as having "swept the world's admiration for the mediaeval chivalry-silliness out of existence". (Note: "A curious exemplification of the power of a single book for good or harm is shown in the effects wrought by Don Quixote and those wrought by Ivanhoe. The first swept the world's admiration for the mediaeval chivalry-silliness out of existence; and the other restored it. As far as our South is concerned, the good work done by Cervantes is pretty nearly a dead letter, so effectually has Scott's pernicious influence undermined it." Mark Twain (1883). Life on the Mississippi, p. 34. (Cited in Moore, 1922.)) It has been described by some as the greatest work ever written.

== Summary ==
For Cervantes and the readers of his day, Don Quixote was a one-volume book published in 1605, divided internally into four parts, not the first part of a two-part set. The mention in the 1605 book of further adventures yet to be told was totally conventional, did not indicate any authorial plans for a continuation, and was not taken seriously by the book's first readers.

=== Part 1 ===
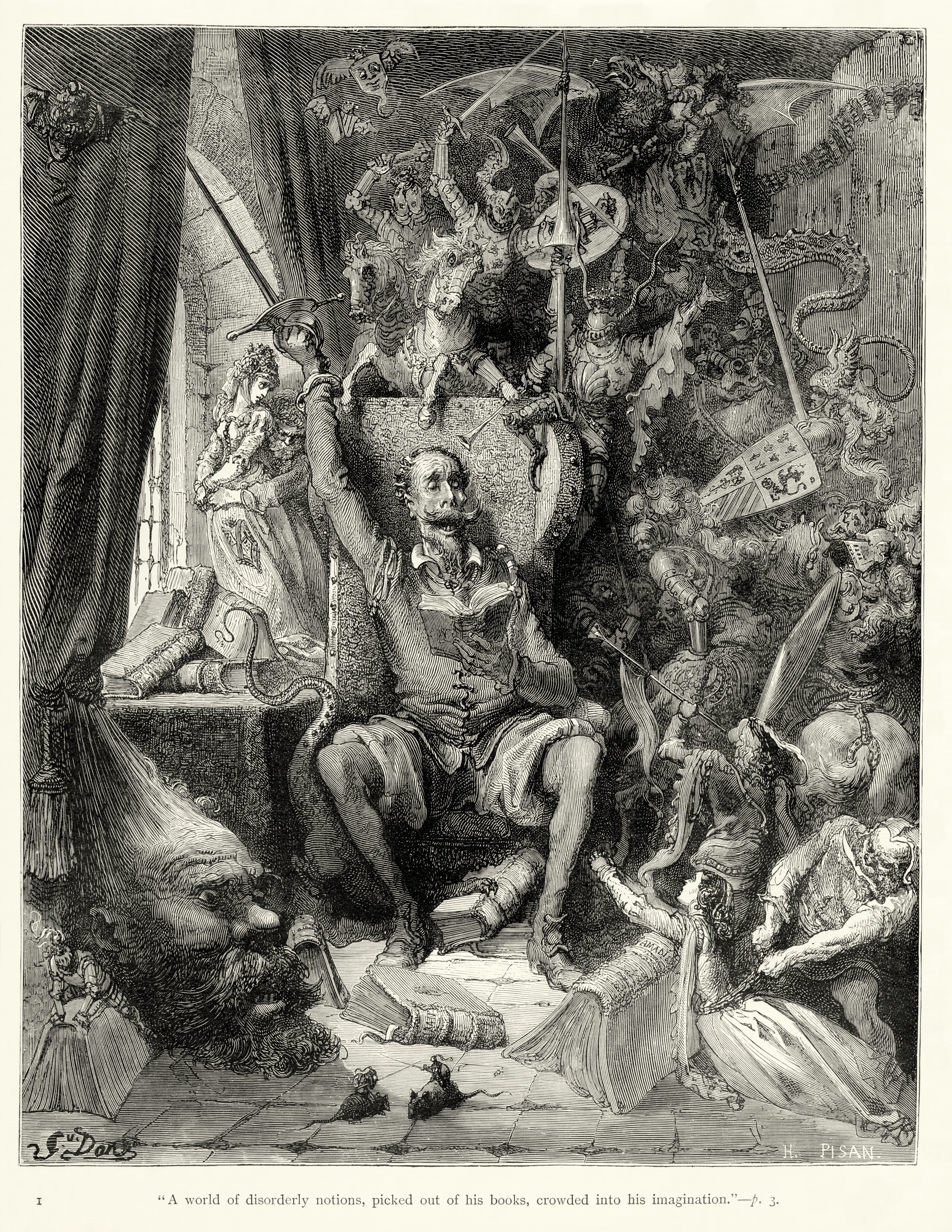
Don Quixote goes mad from his reading of books of chivalry. Engraving by Gustave Doré.

==== The first sally ====
Cervantes, in a metafictional narrative, writes that the first few chapters were taken from "the archives of La Mancha", and the rest were translated from an Arabic text by the Moorish historian Cide Hamete Benengeli.

Alonso Quixano is an hidalgo nearing 50 years of age who lives in a deliberately unspecified region of La Mancha with his niece and housekeeper. While he lives a frugal life, he is full of fantasies about chivalry stemming from his obsession with chivalric romance books. Eventually, his obsession becomes reality when he decides to be a knight errant, donning an old suit of armour. He renames himself "Don Quixote", names his old workhorse "Rocinante", and designates Aldonza Lorenzo (a slaughterhouse worker with a famed hand for salting pork) his lady love, renaming her Dulcinea del Toboso.

As he travels in search of adventure, he arrives at an inn that he believes to be a castle, calls the prostitutes he meets there "ladies", and demands that the innkeeper, whom he takes to be the lord of the castle, dub him a knight. The innkeeper agrees. Quixote starts the night holding vigil at the inn's horse trough, which Quixote imagines to be a chapel. He then becomes involved in a fight with muleteers who try to remove his armour from the horse trough to water their mules. In a pretend ceremony, the innkeeper dubs him a knight to be rid of him and sends him on his way.

Quixote next encounters a servant named Andres who is tied to a tree and being beaten by his master over disputed wages. Quixote orders the master to stop the beating, untie Andres and swear to treat his servant fairly. However, the beating is resumed, and redoubled, as soon as Quixote leaves.

Quixote then chances upon traders from Toledo. He demands that they agree that Dulcinea del Toboso is the most beautiful woman in the world. One of them demands to see her picture so that he can decide for himself. Enraged, Quixote charges at them but his horse stumbles, causing him to fall. One of the traders beats up Quixote, who is left at the side of the road until a neighbouring peasant brings him back home.

While Quixote lies unconscious in his bed, his niece, the housekeeper, the parish curate, and the local barber decide to burn most of his chivalric and other books, seeing them as the root of his madness. However, while filtering through the books, they enter repeated cycles of pity for such good books (which they decide to preserve by themselves), strong determination to get rid of all other books, then back to pity. Eventually, they seal up the library room, later telling Quixote that it was done by a wizard.

==== The second sally ====
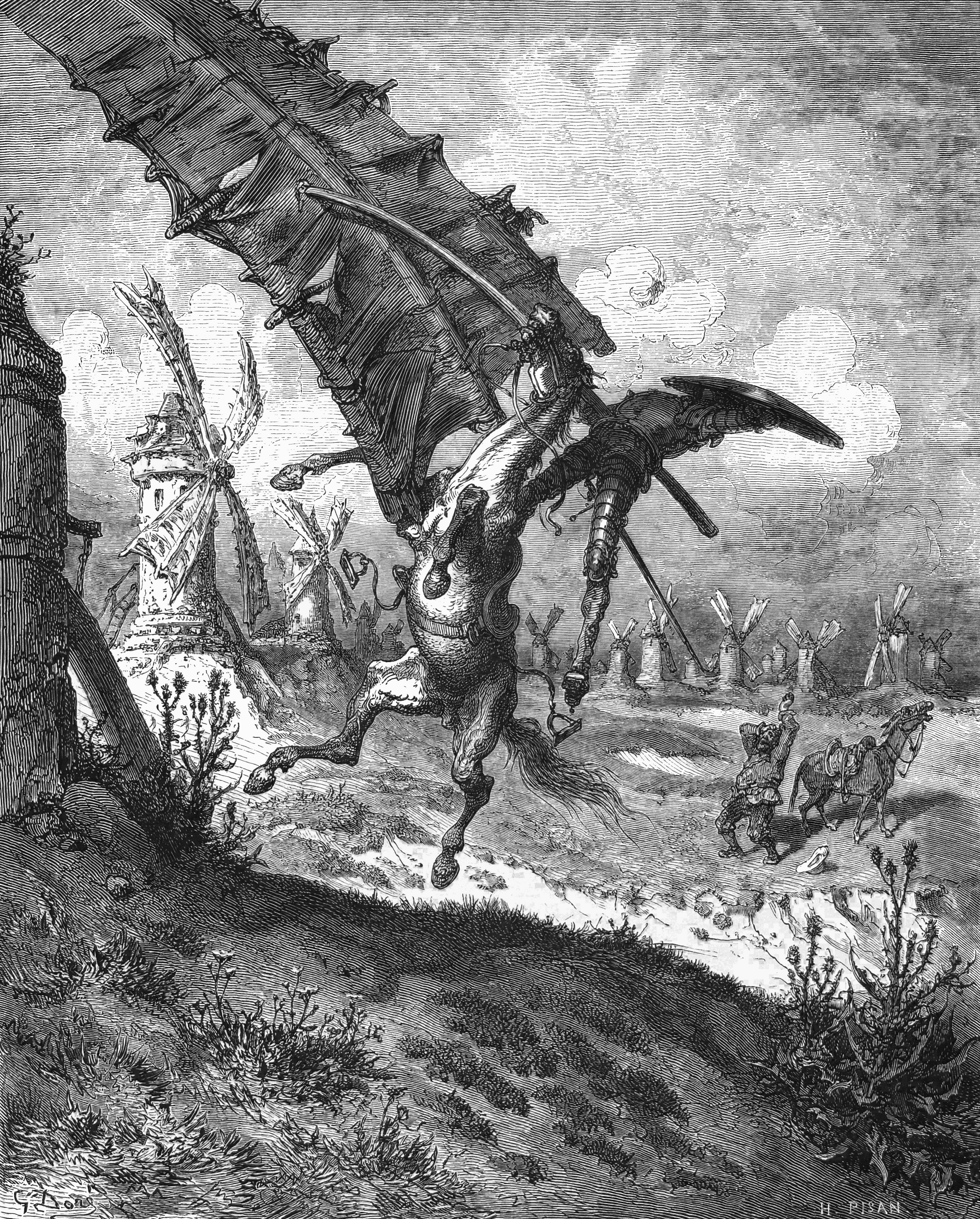
Illustration by Gustave Doré depicting the famous windmill scene

Don Quixote asks his neighbour, the poor farm labourer Sancho Panza, to be his squire, promising him a petty governorship. Sancho agrees and they sneak away at dawn. Their adventures together begin with Quixote's attack on some windmills which he believes to be ferocious giants. They next encounter two Benedictine friars and, nearby, an unrelated lady in a carriage. Quixote takes the friars to be enchanters who are holding the lady captive, knocks one of them from his horse, and is challenged by an armed Basque travelling with the company. The combat ends with the lady leaving her carriage and begging him not to harm the Basque.

After a friendly encounter with some goatherds and a less friendly one with some porters driving Galician ponies, Quixote and Sancho enter an inn owned by Juan Palomeque, where a mix-up involving a servant girl's romantic rendezvous with another guest results in a brawl. Quixote explains to Sancho that the inn is enchanted. They decide to leave, but Quixote, following the example of the fictional knights, leaves without paying. Sancho ends up wrapped in a blanket and tossed in the air by several mischievous guests at the inn before he manages to follow.

After further adventures involving a dead body, a barber's basin that Quixote imagines as the legendary helmet of Mambrino, and a group of galley slaves, they wander into the Sierra Morena. There they encounter the dejected and mostly mad Cardenio, who relates his story. Inspired by Cardenio, Quixote decides to imitate what he has read in his chivalric romances and live like a hermit in a display of devotion to Dulcinea. He sends Sancho to deliver a letter to Dulcinea, but instead Sancho finds the barber and priest from his village. They make a plan to trick Quixote into coming home, recruiting Dorotea, a woman they discover in the forest, to pose as the Princess Micomicona, a damsel in distress.

The plan works and Quixote and the group return to the inn, though Quixote is now convinced, thanks to a lie told by Sancho when asked about the letter, that Dulcinea wants to see him. At the inn, several other plots intersect and are resolved. Meanwhile, a sleepwalking Quixote does battle with some wineskins which he takes to be the giant who stole the princess Micomicona's kingdom. An officer of the Santa Hermandad arrives with a warrant for Quixote's arrest for freeing the galley slaves, but the priest begs for the officer to have mercy on account of Quixote's insanity. The officer agrees and Quixote is locked in a cage which he is made to think is an enchantment. He has a learned conversation with a Toledo canon he encounters by chance on the road, in which the canon expresses his scorn for untruthful chivalric books, but Don Quixote defends them. The group stops to eat and lets Quixote out of the cage; he gets into a fight with a goatherd and with a group of pilgrims, who beat him into submission, before he is finally brought home.

The narrator ends the story by saying that he has found manuscripts of Quixote's further adventures.

=== Part 2 ===
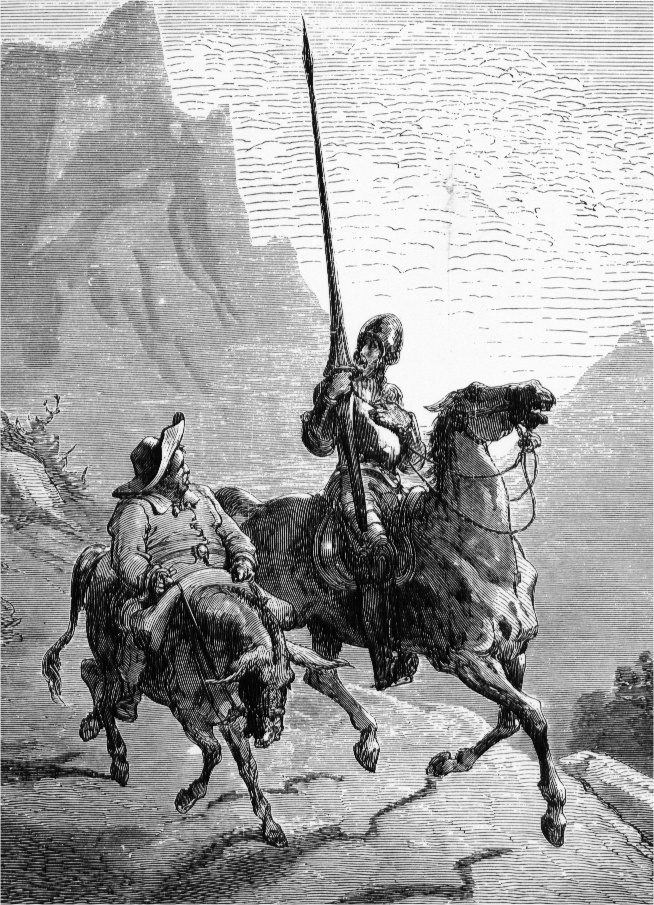
Don Quixote de la Mancha and Sancho Panza, 1863, by Gustave Doré

Although the two parts are often published as a single work, Don Quixote, Part Two was a sequel published ten years after the original novel. In an early example of metafiction, Part Two includes characters who have read the first part of the novel and are thus familiar with the history and peculiarities of the two protagonists.

==== The third sally ====
Don Quixote and Sancho are on their way to El Toboso to meet Dulcinea, with Sancho aware that his story about Dulcinea was a complete fabrication. They reach the city at daybreak and decide to enter at nightfall. However, a bad omen frightens Quixote into retreat and they quickly leave. Sancho is instead sent out alone by Quixote to meet Dulcinea and act as a go-between. Sancho's luck brings three peasant girls along the road and he quickly tells Quixote that they are Dulcinea and her ladies-in-waiting and as beautiful as ever. Since Quixote only sees the peasant girls, Sancho goes on to pretend that an enchantment of some sort is at work.

A duke and duchess encounter the duo. These nobles have read Part One of the story and are themselves very fond of books of chivalry. They decide to play along for their own amusement, beginning a string of imagined adventures and practical jokes. As part of one prank, Quixote and Sancho are led to believe that the only way to release Dulcinea from her spell is for Sancho to give himself three thousand three hundred lashes. Sancho naturally resists this course of action, leading to friction with his master. Under the duke's patronage, Sancho eventually gets his promised governorship, though it is false, and he proves to be a wise and practical ruler before all ends in humiliation. Near the end, Don Quixote reluctantly sways towards sanity.

Quixote battles the Knight of the White Moon (a young man from Quixote's hometown who had earlier posed as the Knight of Mirrors) on the beach in Barcelona. Defeated, Quixote submits to prearranged chivalric terms: the vanquished must obey the will of the conqueror. He is ordered to lay down his arms and cease his acts of chivalry for a period of one year, by which time his friends and relatives hope he will be cured.

On the way back home, Quixote and Sancho "resolve" the disenchantment of Dulcinea. Upon returning to his village, Quixote announces his plan to retire to the countryside as a shepherd, but his housekeeper urges him to stay at home. Soon after, he retires to his bed with a deathly illness, and later awakes from a dream, having fully become Alonso Quixano once more. Sancho tries to restore his faith and his interest in Dulcinea, but Quixano only renounces his previous ambition and apologizes for the harm he has caused. He dictates his will, which includes a provision that his niece will be disinherited if she marries a man who reads books of chivalry.

After Quixano dies, the author emphasizes that there are no more adventures to relate and that any further books about Don Quixote would be spurious.

=== Other stories ===
Don Quixote, Part One contains a number of stories which do not directly involve the two main characters, but which are narrated by some of the picaresque figures encountered by the Don and Sancho during their travels. The longest and best known of these is "El Curioso Impertinente" (The Ill-Advised Curiosity), found in Part One, Book Four. This story, read to a group of travellers at an inn, tells of a Florentine nobleman, Anselmo, who becomes obsessed with testing his wife's fidelity and talks his close friend Lothario into attempting to seduce her, with disastrous results for all.

In Part Two, the author acknowledges the criticism of his digressions in Part One and promises to concentrate the narrative on the central characters (although at one point he laments that his narrative muse has been constrained in this manner). Nevertheless, "Part Two" contains several back narratives related by peripheral characters.

Several abridged editions have been published which delete some or all of the extra tales in order to concentrate on the central narrative.

==== The Ill-Advised Curiosity summary ====
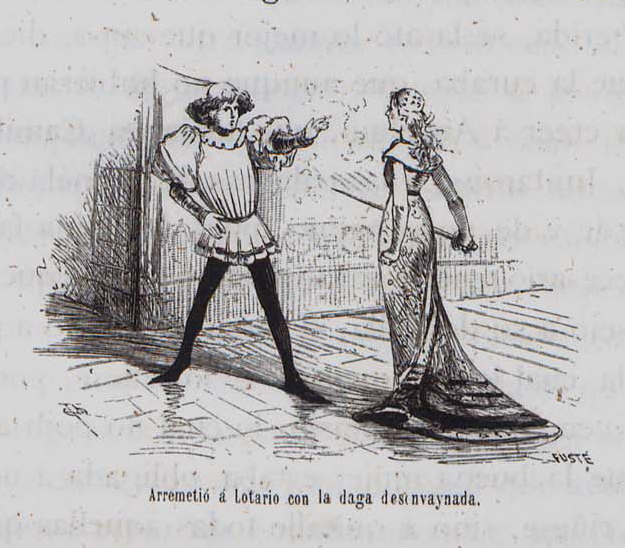
"Camilla threatens Lothario with a dagger", illustration by Apeles Mestres, engraving by Francisco Fusté

The story within a story relates that, for no particular reason, Anselmo decides to test the fidelity of his wife, Camilla, and asks his friend, Lothario, to seduce her. Thinking that to be madness, Lothario reluctantly agrees, and soon reports to Anselmo that Camilla is a faithful wife. Anselmo learns that Lothario has lied and attempted no seduction. He makes Lothario promise to try in earnest and leaves town to make this easier. Lothario tries and Camilla writes letters to her husband telling him of the attempts by Lothario and asking him to return. Anselmo makes no reply and does not return. Lothario then falls in love with Camilla, who eventually reciprocates; an affair between them ensues, but is not disclosed to Anselmo, and their affair continues after Anselmo returns.

One day, Lothario sees a man leaving Camilla's house and jealously presumes she has taken another lover. He tells Anselmo that, at last, he has been successful and arranges a time and place for Anselmo to see the seduction. Before this rendezvous, however, Lothario learns that the man was the lover of Camilla's maid. He and Camilla then contrive to deceive Anselmo further: When Anselmo watches them, she refuses Lothario, protests her love for her husband, and stabs herself lightly in the breast. Anselmo is reassured of her fidelity. The affair restarts with Anselmo none the wiser.

Later, the maid's lover is discovered by Anselmo. Fearing that Anselmo will kill her, the maid says she will tell Anselmo a secret the next day. Anselmo tells Camilla that this is to happen, and Camilla expects that her affair is to be revealed. Lothario and Camilla flee that night. The maid flees the next day. Anselmo searches for them in vain before learning from a stranger of his wife's affair. He starts to write the story, but dies of grief before he can finish. Lothario is killed in battle soon afterward and Camilla dies of grief.

== Style and interpretations ==
=== Use of language ===
The novel's farcical elements make use of punning and similar verbal playfulness. Character-naming in Don Quixote makes ample figural use of contradiction, inversion, and irony, such as the names Rocinante (a reversal) and Dulcinea (an allusion to illusion), and the word quixote itself, possibly a pun on quijada (jaw) but certainly cuixot (Catalan: thighs), a reference to a horse's rump.

As a military term, the word quijote refers to cuisses, part of a full suit of plate armour protecting the thighs. The Spanish suffix -ote denotes the augmentative—for example, grande means large, but grandote means extra large, with grotesque connotations. Following this example, Quixote would suggest 'The Great Quijano', an oxymoronic play on words that makes much sense in light of the character's delusions of grandeur.

Cervantes wrote his work in Early Modern Spanish, heavily borrowing from Old Spanish, the medieval form of the language. The language of Don Quixote, although still containing archaisms, is far more understandable to modern Spanish readers than is, for instance, the completely medieval Spanish of the Poema de mio Cid, a kind of Spanish that is as different from Cervantes' language as Middle English is from Modern English. The Old Castilian language was also used to show the higher class that came with being a knight errant.

In Don Quixote, there are basically two different types of Castilian: Old Castilian is spoken only by Don Quixote, while the rest of the roles speak a contemporary (late 16th century) version of Spanish. The Old Castilian of Don Quixote is a humoristic resource—he copies the language spoken in the chivalric books that drove him to madness; and many times when he talks nobody is able to understand him because his language is too old. This humorous effect is more difficult to see nowadays because the reader must be able to distinguish the two old versions of the language, but when the book was published it was much celebrated. (English translations can get some sense of the effect by having Don Quixote use the Early Modern English of the King James Bible or Shakespeare, or even Middle English.)

In Old Castilian, the letter x represented the sound written sh in modern English, so the name was originally pronounced [kiˈʃote]. However, as Old Castilian evolved towards modern Spanish, a sound change caused it to be pronounced with a voiceless velar fricative [x] sound (like the Scots or German ch), and today the Spanish pronunciation of "Quixote" is [kiˈxote]. The original pronunciation is reflected in languages such as Asturian, Leonese, Galician, Catalan, Italian, Portuguese, Turkish and French, where it is pronounced with a "sh" or "ch" sound; the French opera Don Quichotte is one of the best-known modern examples of this pronunciation.

Today, English speakers generally attempt something close to the modern Spanish pronunciation of Quixote (Quijote), as /kiːˈhoʊti/, although the traditional English spelling-based pronunciation with the value of the letter x in modern English is still sometimes used, resulting in /ˈkwɪksət/ or /ˈkwɪksoʊt/. In Australian English, the preferred pronunciation amongst members of the educated classes was /ˈkwɪksət/ until well into the 1970s, as part of a tendency for the upper class to "anglicise its borrowing ruthlessly". The traditional English rendering is preserved in the pronunciation of the adjectival form quixotic, i.e., /kwɪkˈsɒtɪk/, defined by Merriam-Webster as the foolishly impractical pursuit of ideals, typically marked by rash and lofty romanticism.

=== Meaning ===
Harold Bloom says Don Quixote is the first modern novel, and that the protagonist is at war with Freud's reality principle, which accepts the necessity of dying. Bloom says that the novel has an endless range of meanings, but that a recurring theme is the human need to withstand suffering.

Edith Grossman, who wrote and published a highly acclaimed English translation of the novel in 2003, says that the book is mostly meant to move people into emotion using a systematic change of course, on the verge of both tragedy and comedy at the same time. Grossman has stated:

The question is that Quixote has multiple interpretations [...] and how do I deal with that in my translation. I'm going to answer your question by avoiding it [...] so when I first started reading the Quixote I thought it was the most tragic book in the world, and I would read it and weep [...] As I grew older [...] my skin grew thicker [...] and so when I was working on the translation I was actually sitting at my computer and laughing out loud. This is done [...] as Cervantes did it [...] by never letting the reader rest. You are never certain that you truly got it. Because as soon as you think you understand something, Cervantes introduces something that contradicts your premise.

=== Themes ===
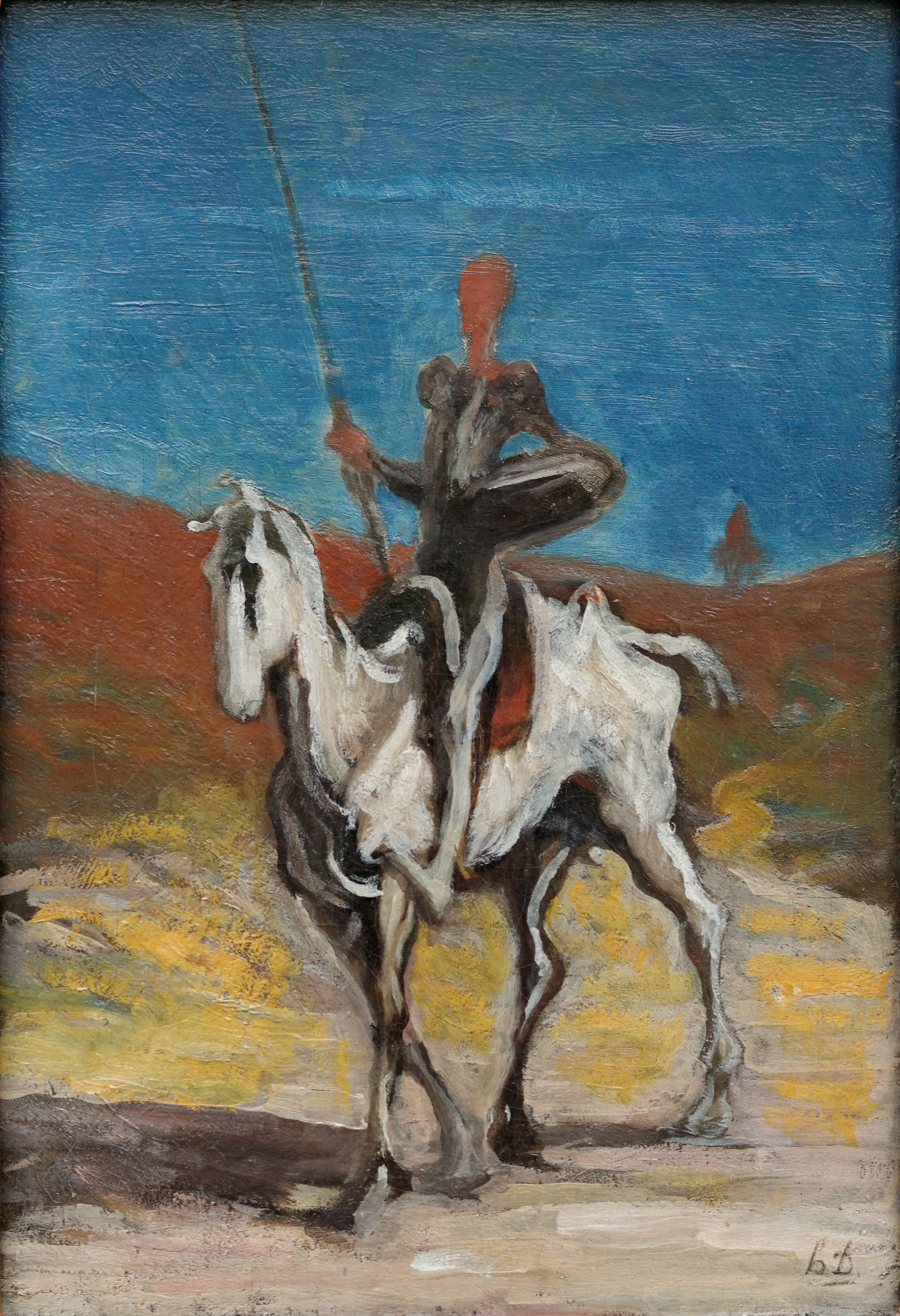
Don Quixote by Honoré Daumier (1868)

The novel's structure is episodic in form. The full title is indicative of the tale's object, as ingenioso (Spanish) means "quick with inventiveness", marking the transition of modern literature from dramatic to thematic unity. The novel takes place over a long period of time, including many adventures united by common themes of the nature of reality, reading, and dialogue in general.

Although burlesque on the surface, the novel, especially in its second half, has served as an important thematic source not only in literature but also in much of art and music, inspiring works by Pablo Picasso and Richard Strauss. The contrasts between the tall, thin, fancy-struck and idealistic Quixote and the fat diddy, world-weary Panza is a motif echoed ever since the book's publication, and Don Quixote's imaginings are the butt of outrageous and cruel practical jokes in the novel.

Even faithful and simple Sancho is forced to deceive him at certain points. In exploring the individualism of his characters, Cervantes helped lead literary practice beyond the narrow convention of the chivalric romance. He spoofs the chivalric romance through a straightforward retelling of a series of acts that redound to the knightly virtues of the hero. The character of Don Quixote became so well known in its time that the word quixotic was quickly adopted by many languages. Characters such as Sancho Panza and Don Quixote's steed, Rocinante, are emblems of Western literary culture. The phrase "tilting at windmills" to describe an act of attacking imaginary enemies (or an act of extreme idealism), derives from an iconic scene in the book.

It stands in a unique position between medieval romance and the modern novel. The former consists of disconnected stories featuring the same characters and settings with little exploration of the inner life of even the main character. The latter are usually focused on the psychological evolution of their characters. In Part I, Quixote imposes himself on his environment. By Part II, people know about him through "having read his adventures", and so, he needs to do less to maintain his image. By his deathbed, he has regained his sanity, and is once more "Alonso Quixano the Good".

== Background ==
The cave of Medrano (also known as the casa de Medrano) in Argamasilla de Alba, which has been known since the beginning of the 17th century, and according to the tradition of Argamasilla de Alba, was the prison of Miguel de Cervantes and the place where he conceived and began to write his famous work "Don Quixote de la Mancha."

=== Sources ===
Sources for Don Quixote include the Castilian novel Amadis de Gaula, which had enjoyed great popularity throughout the 16th century. Another prominent source, which Cervantes evidently admires more, is Tirant lo Blanch, which the priest describes in Chapter VI of Quixote as "the best book in the world." (However, the sense in which it was "best" is much debated among scholars. Since the 19th century, the passage has been called "the most difficult passage of Don Quixote".) The scene of the book burning provides a list of Cervantes's likes and dislikes about literature.

Cervantes makes a number of references to the Italian poem Orlando furioso. In chapter 10 of the first part of the novel, Don Quixote says he must take the magical helmet of Mambrino, an episode from Canto I of Orlando, and itself a reference to Matteo Maria Boiardo's Orlando innamorato. The interpolated story in chapter 33 of Part four of the First Part is a retelling of a tale from Canto 43 of Orlando, regarding a man who tests the fidelity of his wife.

Another important source appears to have been Apuleius's The Golden Ass, one of the earliest known novels, a picaresque from late classical antiquity. The wineskins episode near the end of the interpolated tale "The Curious Impertinent" in chapter 35 of the first part of Don Quixote is a clear reference to Apuleius, and recent scholarship suggests that the moral philosophy and the basic trajectory of Apuleius's novel are fundamental to Cervantes' program. Similarly, many of both Sancho's adventures in Part II and proverbs throughout are taken from popular Spanish and Italian folklore.

Cervantes' experiences as a galley slave in Algiers also influenced Quixote.

Medical theories may have also influenced Cervantes' literary process. Cervantes had familial ties to the distinguished medical community. His father, Rodrigo de Cervantes, and his great-grandfather, Juan Díaz de Torreblanca, were surgeons. Additionally, his sister, Andrea de Cervantes, was a nurse. He also befriended many individuals involved in the medical field, in that he knew medical author Francisco Díaz, an expert in urology, and royal doctor Antonio Ponce de Santa Cruz who served as a personal doctor to both Philip III and Philip IV of Spain.

Apart from the personal relations Cervantes maintained within the medical field, Cervantes' personal life was defined by an interest in medicine. He frequently visited patients from the Hospital de Innocentes in Sevilla. Furthermore, Cervantes explored medicine in his personal library. His library contained more than 200 volumes and included books like Examen de Ingenios, by Juan Huarte and Practica y teórica de cirugía, by Dionisio Daza Chacón that defined medical literature and medical theories of his time.

Researchers Isabel Sanchez Duque and Francisco Javier Escudero have found that Cervantes was a friend of the family Villaseñor, which was involved in a combat with Francisco de Acuña. Both sides combated disguised as medieval knights in the road from El Toboso to Miguel Esteban in 1581. They also found a person called Rodrigo Quijada, who bought the title of nobility of "hidalgo", and created diverse conflicts with the help of a squire.

=== Spurious Second Part by Avellaneda ===
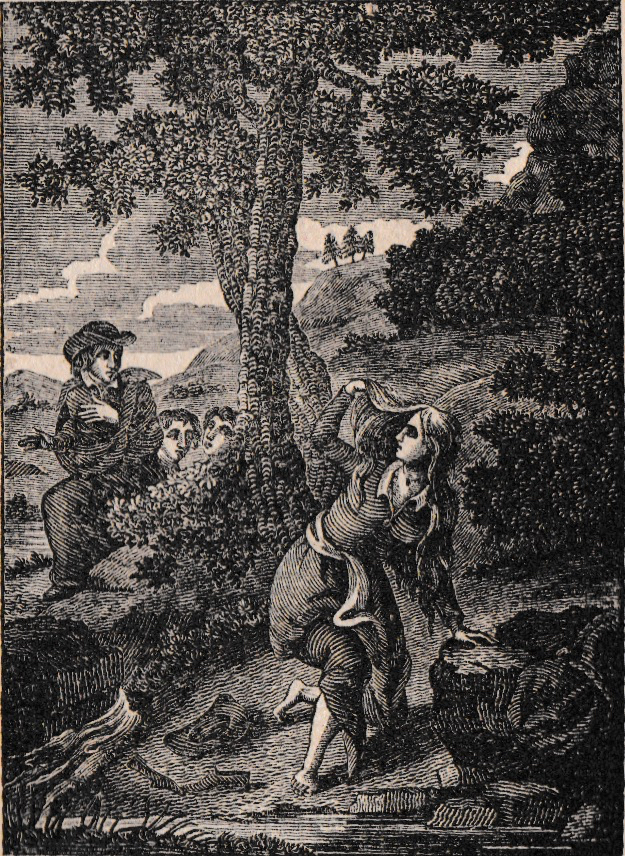
Illustration to The Ingenious Gentleman Don Quixote of La Mancha, Volume II

It is not certain when Cervantes began writing Part Two of Don Quixote, but he had probably not proceeded much further than Chapter LIX by late July 1614. In about September, however, a spurious Part Two, entitled Second Volume of the Ingenious Gentleman Don Quixote of La Mancha: by the Licenciado (doctorate) Alonso Fernández de Avellaneda, of Tordesillas, was published in Tarragona by an unidentified Aragonese who was an admirer of Lope de Vega, rival of Cervantes. It was translated into English by William Augustus Yardley, Esquire in two volumes in 1784.

Some modern scholars suggest that Don Quixote's fictional encounter with Avellaneda's book in Chapter 59 of Part II should not be taken as the date that Cervantes encountered it, which may have been much earlier.

Avellaneda's identity has been the subject of many theories, but there is no consensus as to who he was. In its prologue, the author gratuitously insulted Cervantes, who took offence and responded; the last half of Chapter LIX and most of the following chapters of Cervantes's Segunda Parte lend some insight into the effects upon him; Cervantes manages to work in some subtle digs at Avellaneda's own work, and in his preface to Part II, comes very near to criticising Avellaneda directly.

In his introduction to The Portable Cervantes, Samuel Putnam, a noted translator of Cervantes' novel, calls Avellaneda's version "one of the most disgraceful performances in history".

The second part of Cervantes' Don Quixote, finished as a direct result of the Avellaneda book, has come to be regarded by some literary critics as superior to the first part, because of its greater depth of characterization, its discussions, mostly between Quixote and Sancho, on diverse subjects, and its philosophical insights. In Cervantes's Segunda Parte, Don Quixote visits a printing-house in Barcelona and finds Avellaneda's Second Part being printed there, in an early example of metafiction. Don Quixote and Sancho Panza also meet one of the characters from Avellaneda's book, Don Alvaro Tarfe, and make him swear that the "other" Quixote and Sancho are impostors.

=== Setting ===
==== Location ====
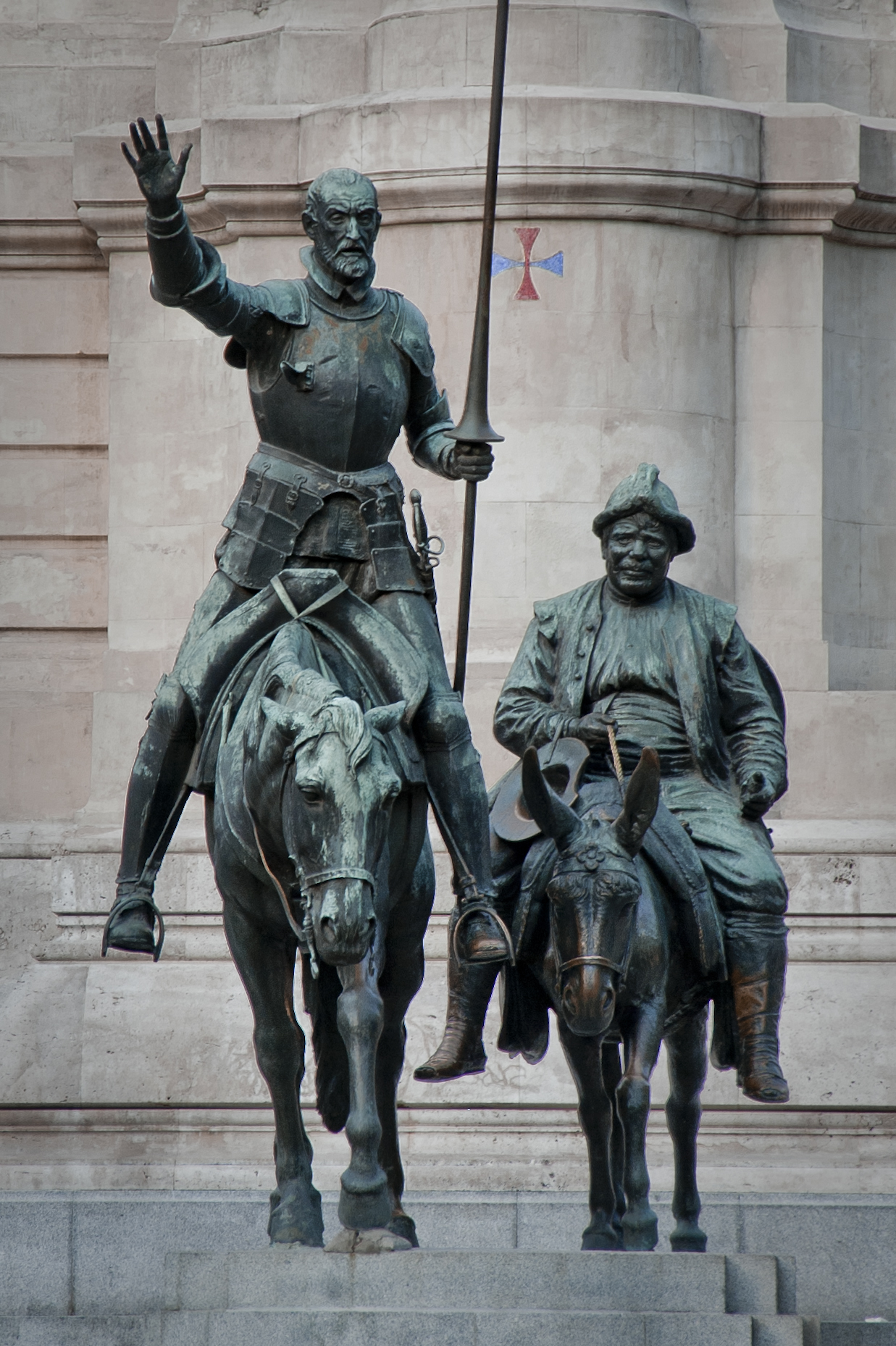
Bronze statues of Don Quixote and Sancho Panza, at the Plaza de España in Madrid

Cervantes' story takes place on an unspecified place in the plains of La Mancha, with some authors suggesting that a more precise location would be that of the comarca of Campo de Montiel, located in what is nowadays the province of Ciudad Real.

En un lugar de La Mancha, de cuyo nombre no quiero acordarme, no ha mucho tiempo que vivía un hidalgo de los de lanza en astillero, adarga antigua, rocín flaco y galgo corredor.
(Somewhere in La Mancha, in a place whose name I do not care to remember, a gentleman lived not long ago, one of those who has a lance and ancient shield on a shelf and keeps a skinny nag and a greyhound for racing.)

— Miguel de Cervantes, Don Quixote, Volume I, Chapter I (translated by Edith Grossman)

The location of the village to which Cervantes alludes in the opening sentence of Don Quixote has been the subject of debate since its publication over four centuries ago. Indeed, Cervantes deliberately omits the name of the village, giving an explanation in the final chapter:

Such was the end of the Ingenious Gentleman of La Mancha, whose village Cide Hamete would not indicate precisely, in order to leave all the towns and villages of La Mancha to contend among themselves for the right to adopt him and claim him as a son, as the seven cities of Greece contended for Homer.

— Miguel de Cervantes, Don Quixote, Volume II, Chapter 74

In 2004, a team of academics from Complutense University, led by Francisco Parra Luna, Manuel Fernández Nieto, and Santiago Petschen Verdaguer, deduced that the village was that of Villanueva de los Infantes. Their findings were published in a paper titled "'El Quijote' como un sistema de distancias/tiempos: hacia la localización del lugar de la Mancha", which was later published as a book: El enigma resuelto del Quijote. The result was replicated in two subsequent investigations: "La determinación del lugar de la Mancha como problema estadístico" and "The Kinematics of the Quixote and the Identity of the 'Place in La Mancha'".

Translators of Don Quixote, such as John Ormsby, have commented that the region of La Mancha is one of the most desertlike, unremarkable regions of Spain, the least romantic and fanciful place that one would imagine as the home of a courageous knight.

On the other hand, as Borges points out:

I suspect that in Don Quixote, it does not rain a single time. The landscapes described by Cervantes have nothing in common with the landscapes of Castile: they are conventional landscapes, full of meadows, streams, and copses that belong in an Italian novel.

— Jorge Luis Borges

The story also takes place in El Toboso where Don Quixote goes to seek Dulcinea's blessings.

==== Historical context ====
Don Quixote is said to reflect the Spanish society in which Cervantes lived and wrote. Spain's status as a world power was declining, and the Spanish national treasury was bankrupt due to expensive foreign wars. Spanish cultural dominance was also waning as the Protestant Reformation had put the Spanish Roman Catholic Church on the defensive, which had led to the establishment of the Spanish Inquisition. Meanwhile, the hidalgo class was losing relevance because of changes in Spanish society which made the high ideals of chivalry obsolete.

== Legacy ==
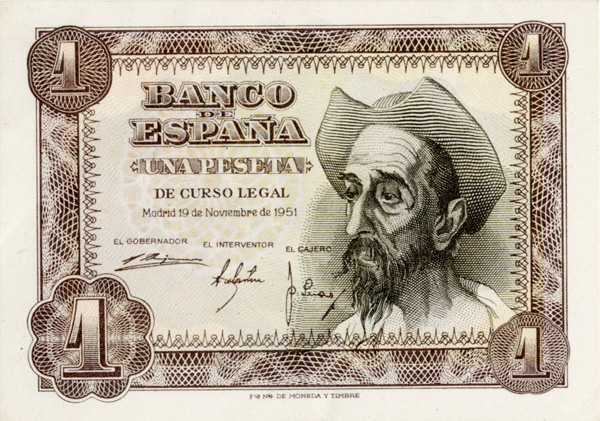
Don Quixote on a 1 Peseta banknote from 1951

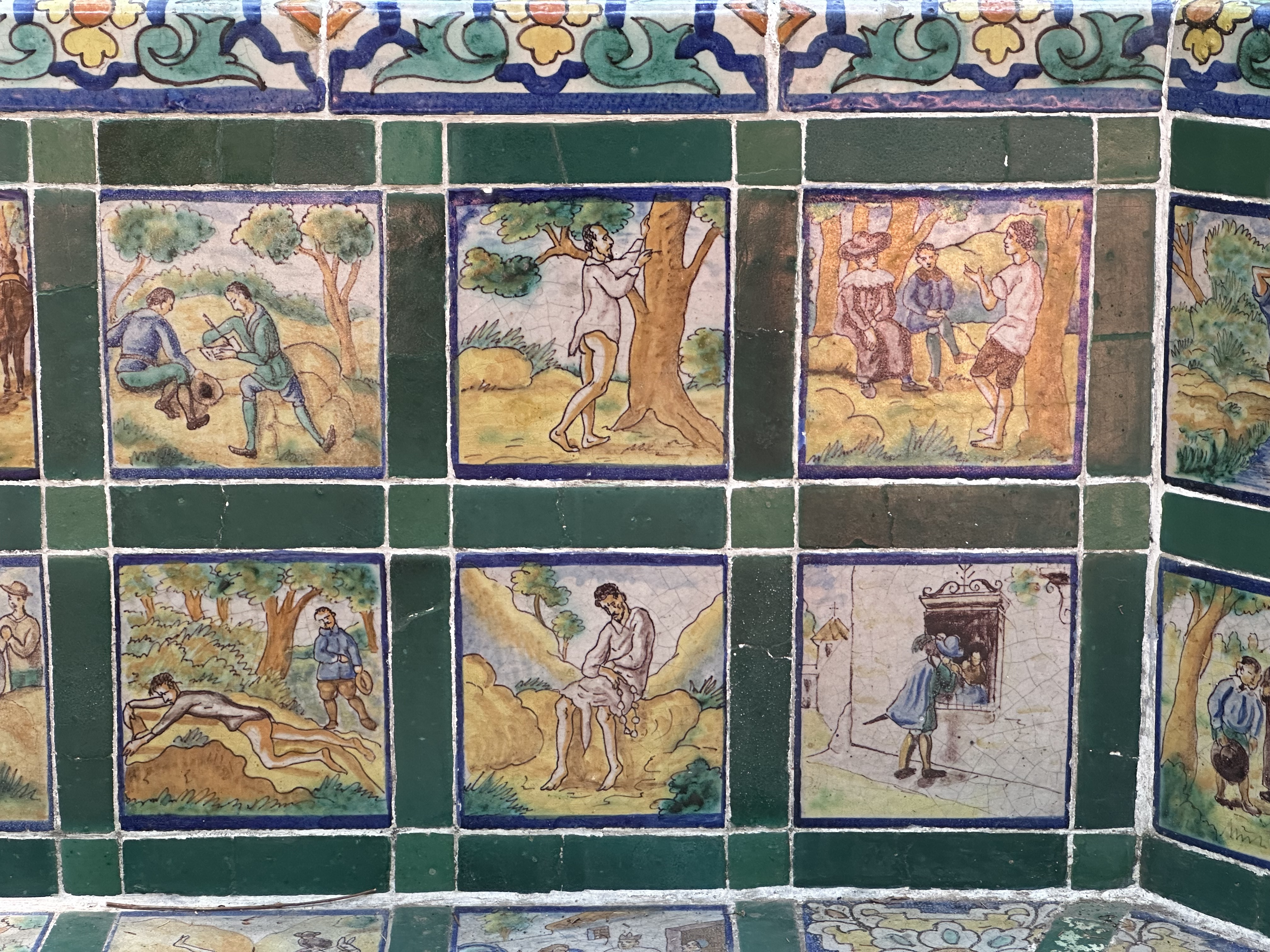
Tiles depicting scenes from Don Quixote on a bench in Chapultepec

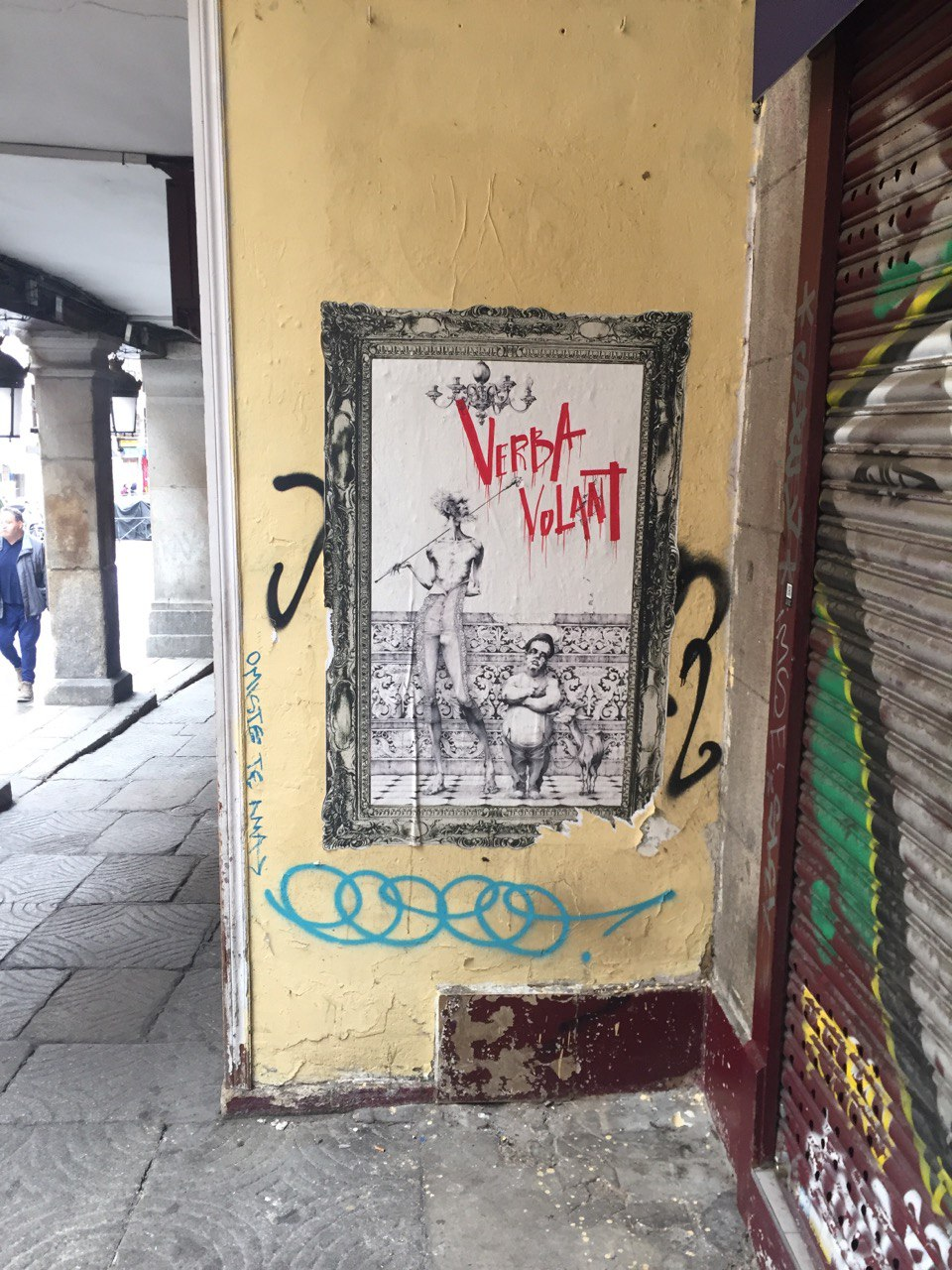
Madrid street art near Plaza España involving Don Quixote

In 2002 the Norwegian Nobel Institute conducted a study among writers from 55 countries, the majority voted Don Quixote "the greatest work of fiction ever written".

=== Influence on modern Spanish ===
The opening sentence of the book created a classic Spanish cliché with the phrase de cuyo nombre no quiero acordarme ("whose name I do not wish to recall"): En un lugar de la Mancha, de cuyo nombre no quiero acordarme, no ha mucho tiempo que vivía un hidalgo de los de lanza en astillero, adarga antigua, rocín flaco y galgo corredor. ("In a village of La Mancha, whose name I do not wish to recall, there lived, not very long ago, one of those gentlemen with a lance in the lance-rack, an ancient shield, a skinny old horse, and a fast greyhound.")

=== Influence on the English language ===
Don Quixote alongside its many translations, has also provided a number of idioms and expressions to the English language. Examples with their own articles include the phrase "the pot calling the kettle black" and the adjective "quixotic".

==== Tilting at windmills ====
Tilting at windmills is an English language idiom that means "attacking imaginary enemies". The expression is derived from Don Quixote, and the word "tilt" in this context refers to jousting. This phrase is sometimes also expressed as "charging at windmills" or "fighting the windmills".

The phrase is sometimes used to describe either confrontations where adversaries are incorrectly perceived, or courses of action that are based on misinterpreted or misapplied heroic, romantic, or idealistic justifications. It may also connote an inopportune, unfounded, and vain effort against adversaries real or imagined.

==== In science ====
Dulcibella camanchaca, a deep-sea amphipod species, was named after the character Dulcinea in the novel, following the tradition of naming amphipods after literary figures.

Lohuecotitan pandafilandi and Qunkasaura pintiquiniestra are dinosaurs named after minor characters in the novel.

The family, genus, and gastropod species Quijotidae, Quijote, and Quijote cervantesi are named after the novel and its author.

== Publication ==
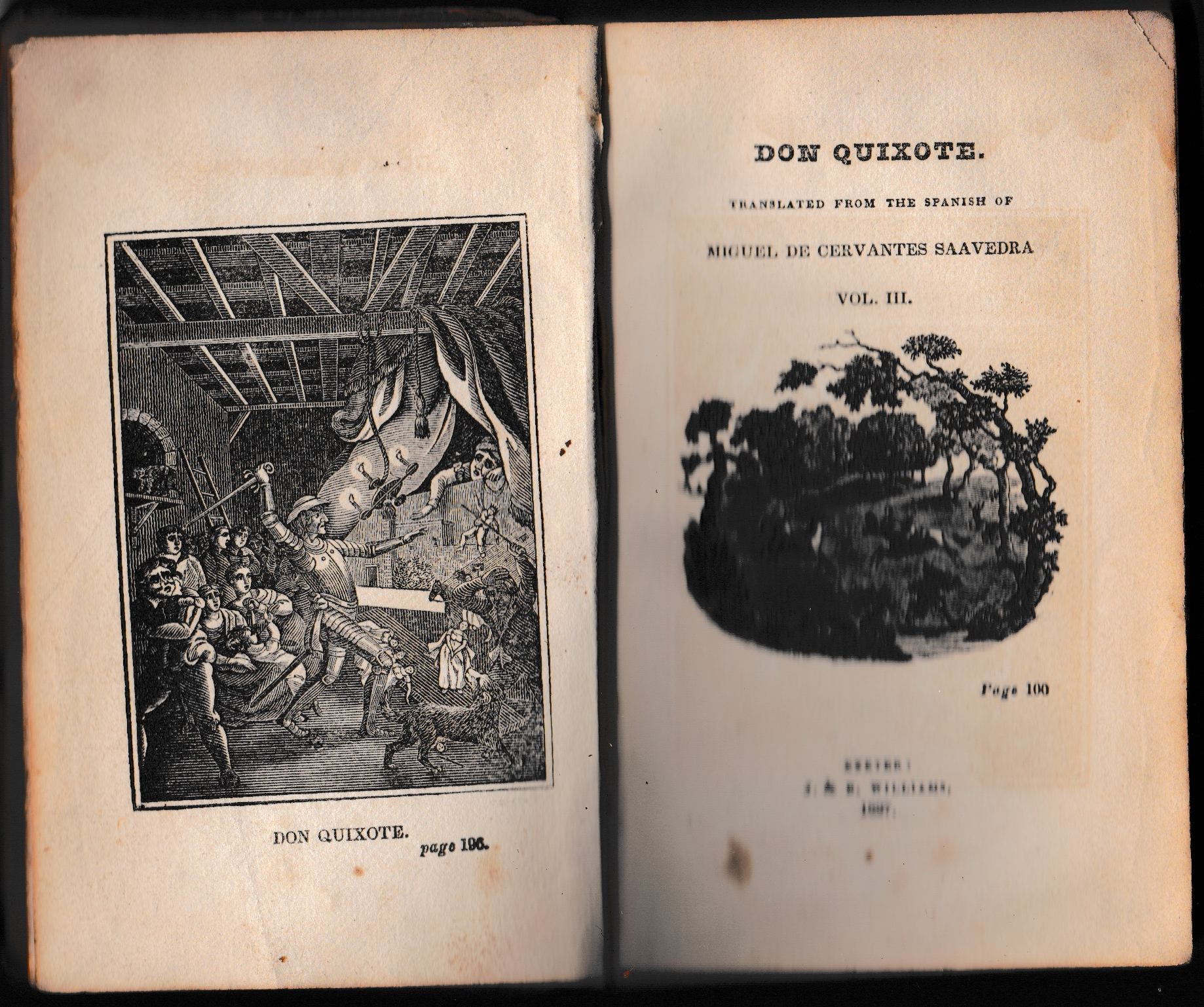
Illustration to Don Quixote de la Mancha by Miguel de Cervantes (the edition translated by Charles Jarvis)

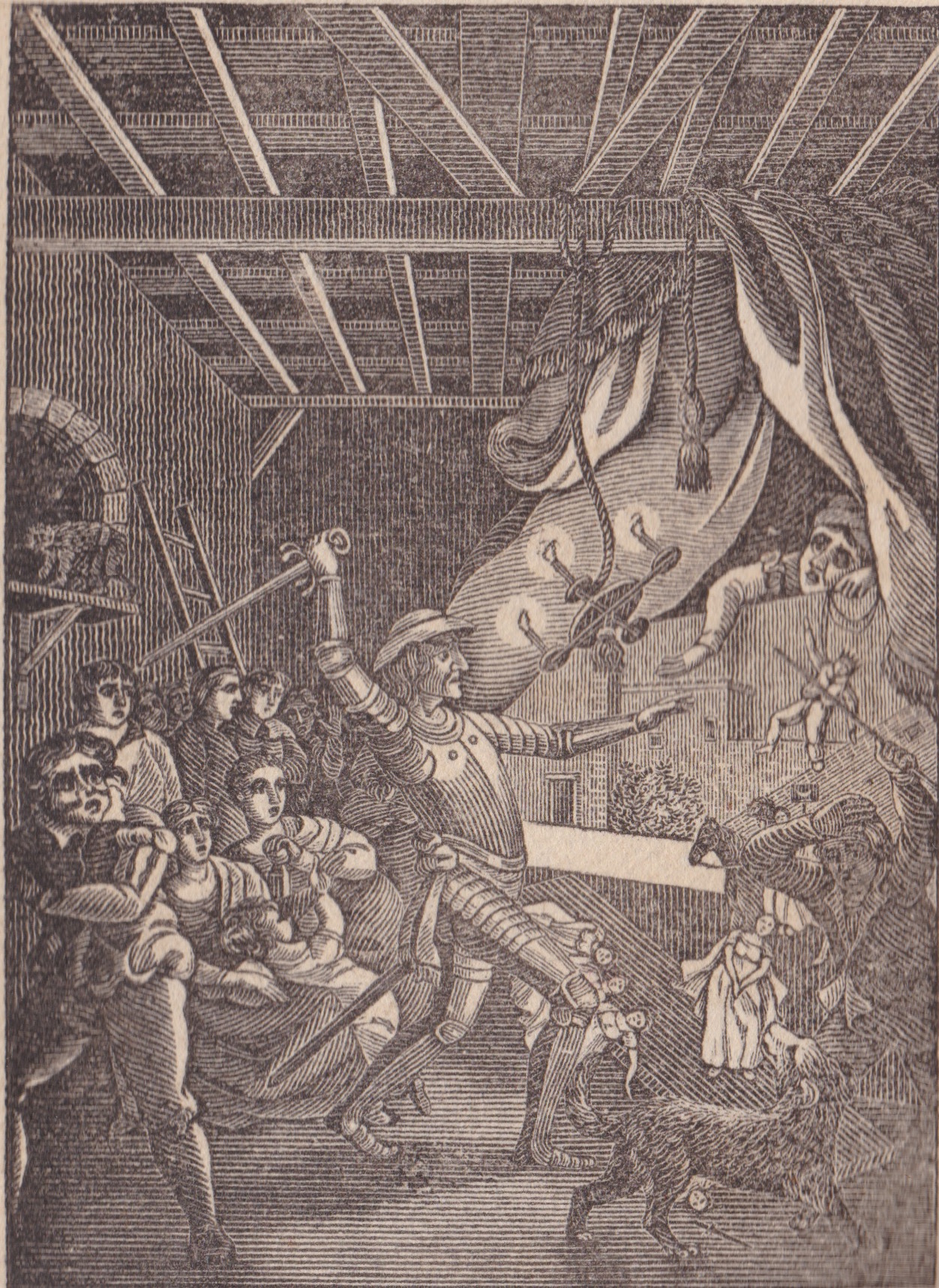
Don Quixote. Close-up of illustration

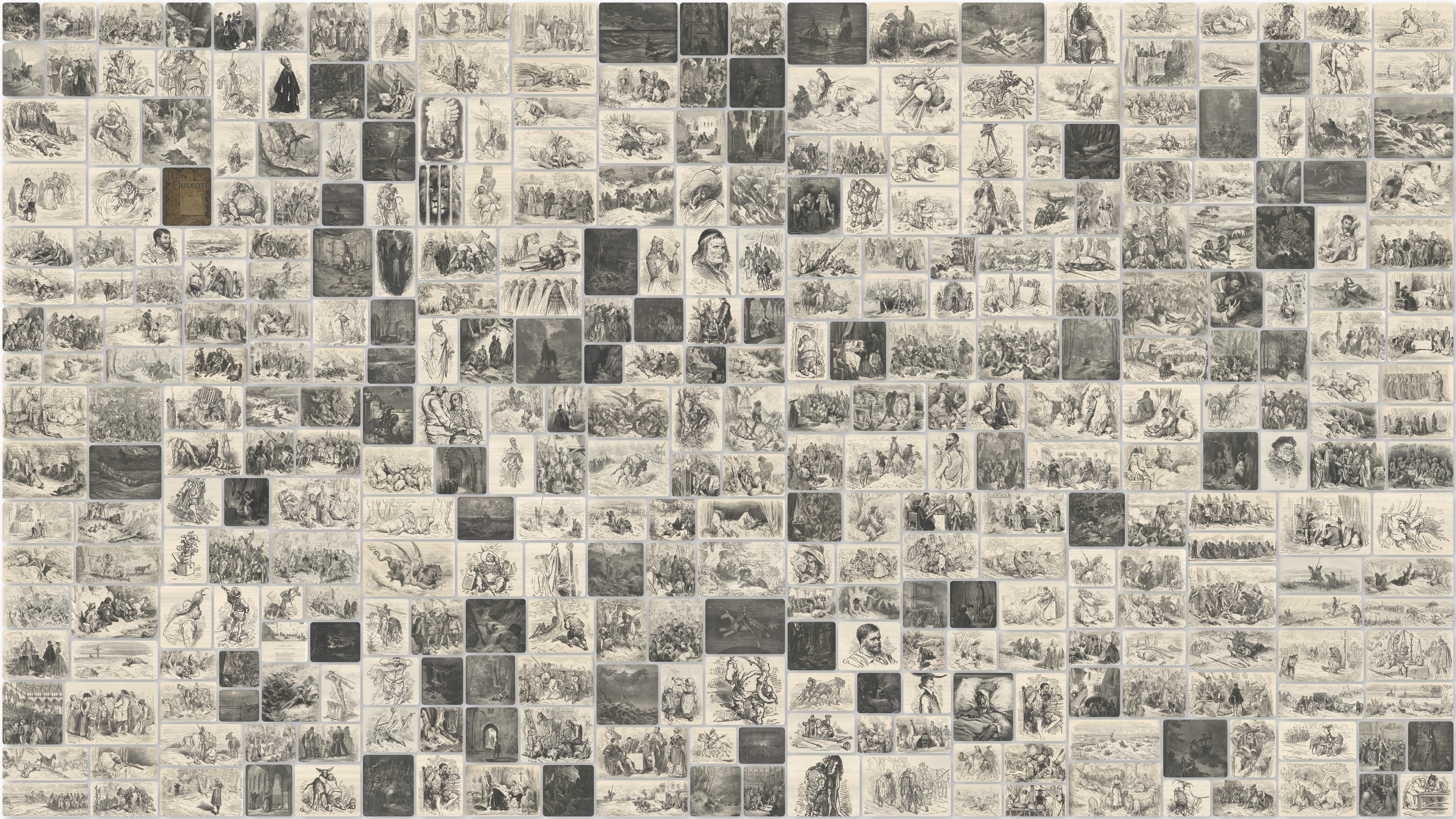
Collage of the engravings of The Adventures of Don Quixote by Gustave Doré

In July 1604, Cervantes sold the rights of El ingenioso hidalgo don Quixote de la Mancha (known as Don Quixote, Part I) to the publisher-bookseller Francisco de Robles for an unknown sum. License to publish was granted in September, the printing was finished in December, and the book came out on 16 January 1605.

The novel was an immediate success. Most of the 400 copies of the first edition were sent to the New World, with the publisher hoping to get a better price in the Americas. Although most of them disappeared in a shipwreck near La Havana, approximately 70 copies reached Lima, from where they were sent to Cuzco, in the heart of the defunct Inca Empire.

No sooner was it in the hands of the public than preparations were made to issue derivative (pirated) editions. In 1614 a fake second part was published by a mysterious author under the pen name Avellaneda. This author was never satisfactorily identified. This rushed Cervantes into writing and publishing a genuine second part in 1615, which was a year before his own death. Don Quixote had been growing in favour, and its author's name was now known beyond the Pyrenees. By August 1605, there were two Madrid editions, two published in Lisbon, and one in Valencia. Publisher Francisco de Robles secured additional copyrights for Aragon and Portugal for a second edition.

Sale of these publishing rights deprived Cervantes of further financial profit on Part One. In 1607, an edition was printed in Brussels. Robles, the Madrid publisher, found it necessary to meet demand with a third edition, a seventh publication in all, in 1608. Popularity of the book in Italy was such that a Milan bookseller issued an Italian edition in 1610. Yet another Brussels edition was called for in 1611. Since then, numerous editions have been released and in total, the novel is believed to have sold more than 500 million copies worldwide. The work has been produced in numerous editions and languages, the Cervantes Collection, at the State Library of New South Wales includes over 1,100 editions. These were collected, by Ben Haneman, over a period of thirty years.

In 1613, Cervantes published the Novelas ejemplares, dedicated to the Maecenas of the day, the Conde de Lemos. Eight and a half years after Part One had appeared came the first hint of a forthcoming Segunda Parte (Part Two). "You shall see shortly", Cervantes says, "the further exploits of Don Quixote and humours of Sancho Panza." Don Quixote, Part Two, published by the same press as its predecessor, appeared late in 1615, and was quickly reprinted in Brussels and Valencia (1616) and Lisbon (1617). Parts One and Two were published as one edition in Barcelona in 1617. In 1632, Cardinal Zapata ordered that the sentence "and remember, Sancho, that works of charity done in a lukewarm and half-hearted way are without merit and of no avail", should be removed from future editions. Historically, Cervantes' work has been said to have "smiled Spain's chivalry away", suggesting that Don Quixote as a chivalric satire contributed to the demise of Spanish chivalry.

=== English editions in translation ===
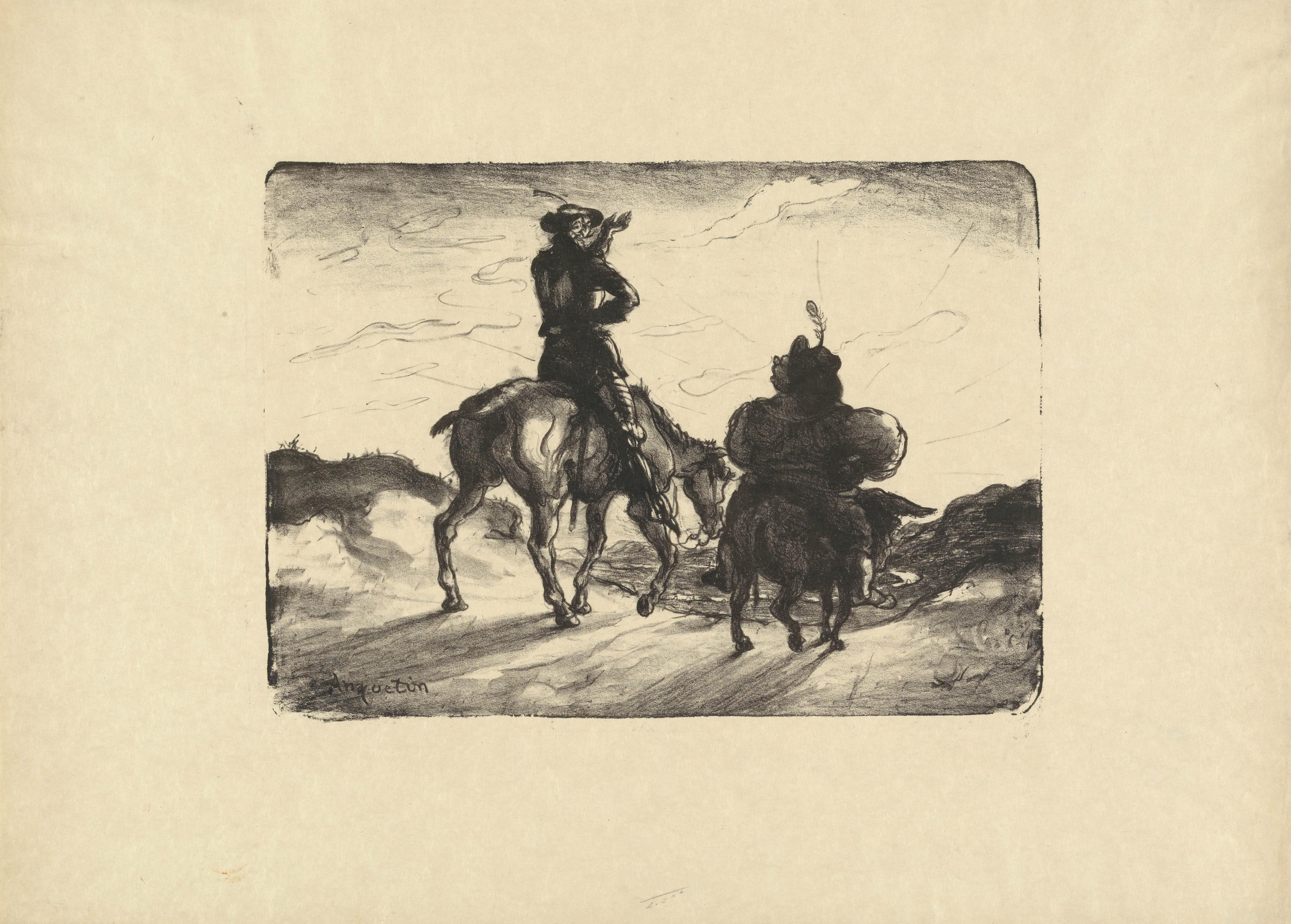
Don Quichote and Sancho Panza by Louis Anquetin

There are many translations of this book, and it has been adapted many times in shortened versions. Many derivative editions were also written at the time, as was the custom of envious or unscrupulous writers. Seven years after the Parte Primera appeared, Don Quixote had been translated into French, German, Italian, and English, with the first French translation of 'Part II' appearing in 1618, and the first English translation in 1620. One abridged adaptation, authored by Agustín Sánchez, runs slightly over 150 pages, cutting away about 750 pages.

Thomas Shelton's English translation of the First Part appeared in 1612 while Cervantes was still alive, although there is no evidence that Shelton had met the author. Although Shelton's version is cherished by some, according to John Ormsby and Samuel Putnam, it was far from satisfactory as a carrying over of Cervantes' text. Shelton's translation of the novel's Second Part appeared in 1620.

Near the end of the 17th century, John Phillips, a nephew of poet John Milton, published what Putnam considered the worst English translation. The translation, as literary critics claim, was not based on Cervantes' text but mostly on a French work by Filleau de Saint-Martin and on notes which Thomas Shelton had written.

Around 1700, a version by Pierre Antoine Motteux appeared. Motteux's translation enjoyed lasting popularity; it was reprinted as the Modern Library Series edition of the novel until recent times. Nonetheless, future translators would find much to fault in Motteux's version: Samuel Putnam criticized "the prevailing slapstick quality of this work, especially where Sancho Panza is involved, the obtrusion of the obscene where it is found in the original, and the slurring of difficulties through omissions or expanding upon the text". John Ormsby considered Motteux's version "worse than worthless", and denounced its "infusion of Cockney flippancy and facetiousness" into the original.

The proverb "The proof of the pudding is in the eating" is widely attributed to Cervantes. The Spanish word for pudding (budín), however, does not appear in the original text but premieres in the Motteux translation. In Smollett's translation of 1755 he notes that the original text reads literally "you will see when the eggs are fried", meaning "time will tell".

A translation by Captain John Stevens, which revised Thomas Shelton's version, also appeared in 1700, but its publication was overshadowed by the simultaneous release of Motteux's translation.

In 1742, the Charles Jervas translation appeared, posthumously. Through a printer's error, it came to be known, and is still known, as "the Jarvis translation". It was the most scholarly and accurate English translation of the novel up to that time, but future translator John Ormsby points out in his own introduction to the novel that the Jarvis translation has been criticized as being too stiff. Nevertheless, it became the most frequently reprinted translation of the novel until about 1885. Another 18th-century translation into English was that of Tobias Smollett, himself a novelist, first published in 1755. Like the Jarvis translation, it continues to be reprinted today.

A translation by Alexander James Duffield appeared in 1881 and another by Henry Edward Watts in 1888. Most modern translators take as their model the 1885 translation by John Ormsby.

An expurgated children's version, under the title The Story of Don Quixote, was published in 1922 (available on Project Gutenberg). It leaves out the risqué sections as well as chapters that young readers might consider dull, and embellishes a great deal on Cervantes' original text. The title page actually gives credit to the two editors as if they were the authors, and omits any mention of Cervantes.

The most widely read English-language translations of the mid-20th century are by Samuel Putnam (1949), J. M. Cohen (1950; Penguin Classics), and Walter Starkie (1957). The last English translation of the novel in the 20th century was by Burton Raffel, published in 1996. The 21st century has already seen five new translations of the novel into English. The first is by John D. Rutherford and the second by Edith Grossman. Reviewing the novel in The New York Times, Carlos Fuentes called Grossman's translation a "major literary achievement" and another called it the "most transparent and least impeded among more than a dozen English translations going back to the 17th century."

In 2005, the year of the novel's 400th anniversary, Tom Lathrop published a new English translation of the novel, based on a lifetime of specialized study of the novel and its history. The fourth translation of the 21st century was released in 2006 by former university librarian James H. Montgomery, 26 years after he had begun it, in an attempt to "recreate the sense of the original as closely as possible, though not at the expense of Cervantes' literary style."

In 2011, another translation by Gerald J. Davis appeared, which is self-published via Lulu.com. The latest and the sixth translation of the 21st century is Diana de Armas Wilson's 2020 revision of Burton Raffel's translation.

== List of English translations ==
=== In public domain ===
1. Thomas Shelton (Part 1: 1612; Revised Part 1 and Part 2: 1620)
2. John Phillips (1687) – the nephew of John Milton
3. Captain John Stevens (1700) (revision of Thomas Shelton)
4. Edward Ward (1700), (The) Life & Notable Adventures of Don Quixote merrily translated into Hudibrastic Verse (39 cantos)
5. Pierre Antoine Motteux (1700)
6. John Ozell (1719) (revision of Pierre Antoine Motteux)
7. John Blunt (1733) (another revision of Thomas Shelton)
8. Charles Jervas (1742)
9. Dr. Tobias Smollett (1755) (revision of Charles Jervas)
10. George Kelly (1769) (considered as another revision of Pierre Antoine Motteux)
11. Charles Henry Wilmot (1774)
12. Mary Smirke with engravings by Robert Smirke (1818)
13. Pierre Antoine Motteux, edited by John Gibson Lockhart (1822)
14. Charles Jervas edited by John Wilson Clark (1871)
15. Alexander James Duffield and James Young Gibson (1881)
16. John Ormsby (1885) – the original version available free on the Internet Archive, is to be preferred to the Wikisource and similar versions that do not include Ormsby's careful notes and with his Introduction much abbreviated.
17. Henry Edward Watts (1888, revised 1895)
18. Robinson Smith (1910)

=== In copyright ===
1. Samuel Putnam (Modern Library, 1949)
2. J. M. Cohen (Penguin, 1950)
3. Walter Starkie (1964)
4. Joseph Ramon Jones and Kenneth Douglas (1981) (revision of Ormsby). (ISBN 978-0393090185, 0393090183) - Norton Critical Edition
5. Burton Raffel (Norton, 1996)
6. John David Rutherford (Penguin, 2000)
7. Edith Grossman (2003)
8. O. M. Brack Jr. (2003) (revision of the 1755 Tobias Smollett revision of Charles Jervas)
9. Thomas Albert Lathrop (2005, Second Edition: 2007)
10. James H. Montgomery (2006)
11. E.C. Riley (2008) (revision of Charles Jervas)
12. Gerald J. Davis (2011)
13. Diana de Armas Wilson (2020) (revision of Burton Raffel)

Reviewing 27 out of the current 30 English translations as a whole in 2008, Daniel Eisenberg stated that there is no one translation ideal for every purpose but expressed a preference for those of Putnam and the revision of Ormsby's translation by Douglas and Jones.

== See also ==
- List of works influenced by Don Quixote – including a gallery of paintings and illustrations
- António José da Silva – writer of Vida do Grande Dom Quixote de la Mancha e do Gordo Sancho Pança (1733)
- Coco – In the last chapter, the epitaph of Don Quijote identifies him as "el coco".
- Man of La Mancha, a musical play based on the life of Cervantes, author of Don Quixote.
- Monsignor Quixote, a novel by Graham Greene
- "Pierre Menard, Author of the Quixote", a short story by Jorge Luis Borges

=== Authors and works mentioned in Don Quixote ===
- Feliciano de Silva – author of Don Quixote's favourite books, 'for their lucidity of style and complicated conceits were as pearls in his sight, particularly when in his reading he came upon courtships and cartels, where he often found passages like "the reason of the unreason with which my reason is afflicted so weakens my reason that with reason I murmur at your beauty;" or again; "the high heavens, that of your divinity divinely fortify you with the stars, render you deserving of the desert your greatness deserves."'
- Alonso Fernández de Avellaneda – author of a spurious sequel to Don Quixote which, in turn, is referenced in the actual sequel
- Amadís de Gaula – one of the chivalric novels found in Don Quixote's library.
- Belianís – one of the chivalric novels found in Don Quixote's library.
- Tirant lo Blanch – one of the chivalric novels mentioned by Don Quixote.

=== General ===
- Great books
- List of best-selling books
- Lists of 100 best books
