= Belianís de Grecia =

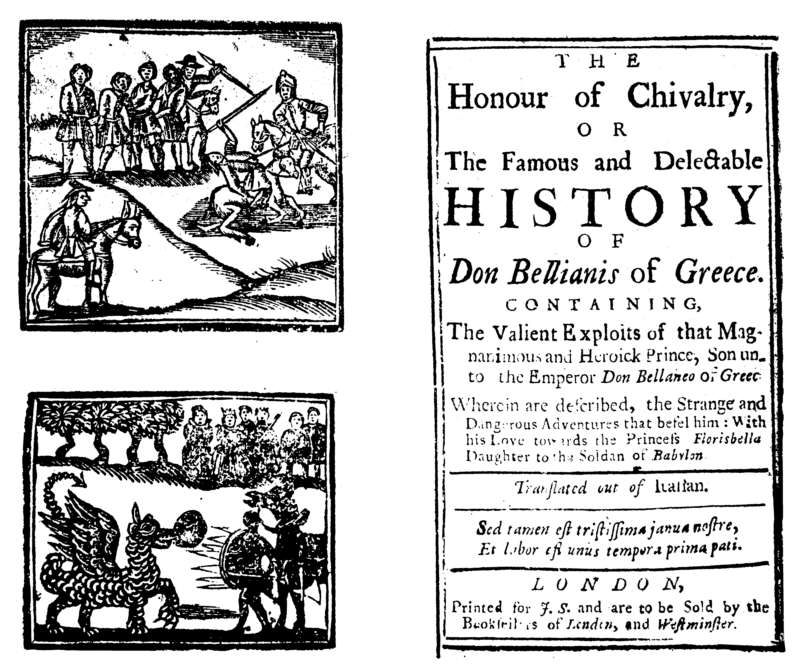
Deteriorated design: early 18th-century chapbook edition of The Honour of Chivalry, first published in English in 1598.

Belianís de Grecia (or Belianis of Greece in English) is the eponymous hero of a Spanish chivalric romance novel, The Honour of Chivalry, following in the footsteps of the influential Amadís de Gaula. An English abridgement of this novel was published in 1673. It is best known today because it was one of the books spared during the expurgation of Don Quixote's library in Chapter 6 of Part I of Don Quixote.

This book was known by the English man of letters Samuel Johnson; see Eithne Henson, “The Fictions of Romantick Chivalry”: Samuel Johnson and Romance, London and Toronto 1992, and John Hardy, "Johnson and Don Bellianis [sic]," Review of English Studies, new series, vol. 17 (1966), pp. 297–299. It is also mentioned by Edmund Burke in the general introduction to his work On Taste where it is contrasted with the Aeneid (referred to as the "Eneid") as being a lower form of literature: The type of reader who "is charmed with Don Bellianis... is not shocked with the continual breaches of probability, the confusion of times, the offences against manners, the trampling upon geography; for he knows nothing of geography and chronology, and he has never examined the grounds of probability." This was no concern for Laurence Sterne; in the final lines of Volume II of The Life and Opinions of Tristram Shandy, Gentleman, Tristram Shandy declares that even "the sage Alquise, the magician in Don Belianis of Greece, nor the no less famous Urganda, the sorceress his wife, (were they alive) could pretend to come within a league of the truth."
