= Mambrino =

Fictional Moorish king

Mambrino was a fictional Moorish king, celebrated in the romances of chivalry. His first appearance is in the late fourteenth-century Cantari di Rinaldo, also known as Rinaldo da Monte Albano, Rinaldo Innamorato or Innamoramento di Rinaldo. The Cantari di Rinaldo is an adaptation of the Old French chanson de geste, Renaud de Montauban, also known as Les Quatre Fils Aymon. In the Old French, Renaud defeats the Saracen king Begon, who was invading King Yon's kingdom of Gascony. The Italian replaces Begon with Mambrino, and furnishes him with an elaborate backstory. In the Cantari, Mambrino is one of six brothers, all giants. Four of the brothers had been decapitated by Rinaldo on various occasions earlier in the poem, so that his invasion of Gascony was motivated by his desire for vengeance. Rinaldo, as the Italians called Renaud, wins the war by defeating Mambrino in single combat and decapitating him as well. Mambrino's helmet, in this poem, has for its crest an idol which is so constructed that whenever the wind blows through it, it says, "Long live the most noble lord Mambrino, and all his barons."

In later poems, Mambrino’s helmet was made of pure gold and rendered its wearer invulnerable. These are the helmet's attributes in the Orlando Innamorato and the Orlando Furioso, throughout which poems it is worn by Rinaldo. Francesco Cieco da Ferrara's poem, Mambriano, is about the titular son of Mambrino's sister and his attempt to avenge his uncle. Both the sister and the nephew were invented by Francesco.

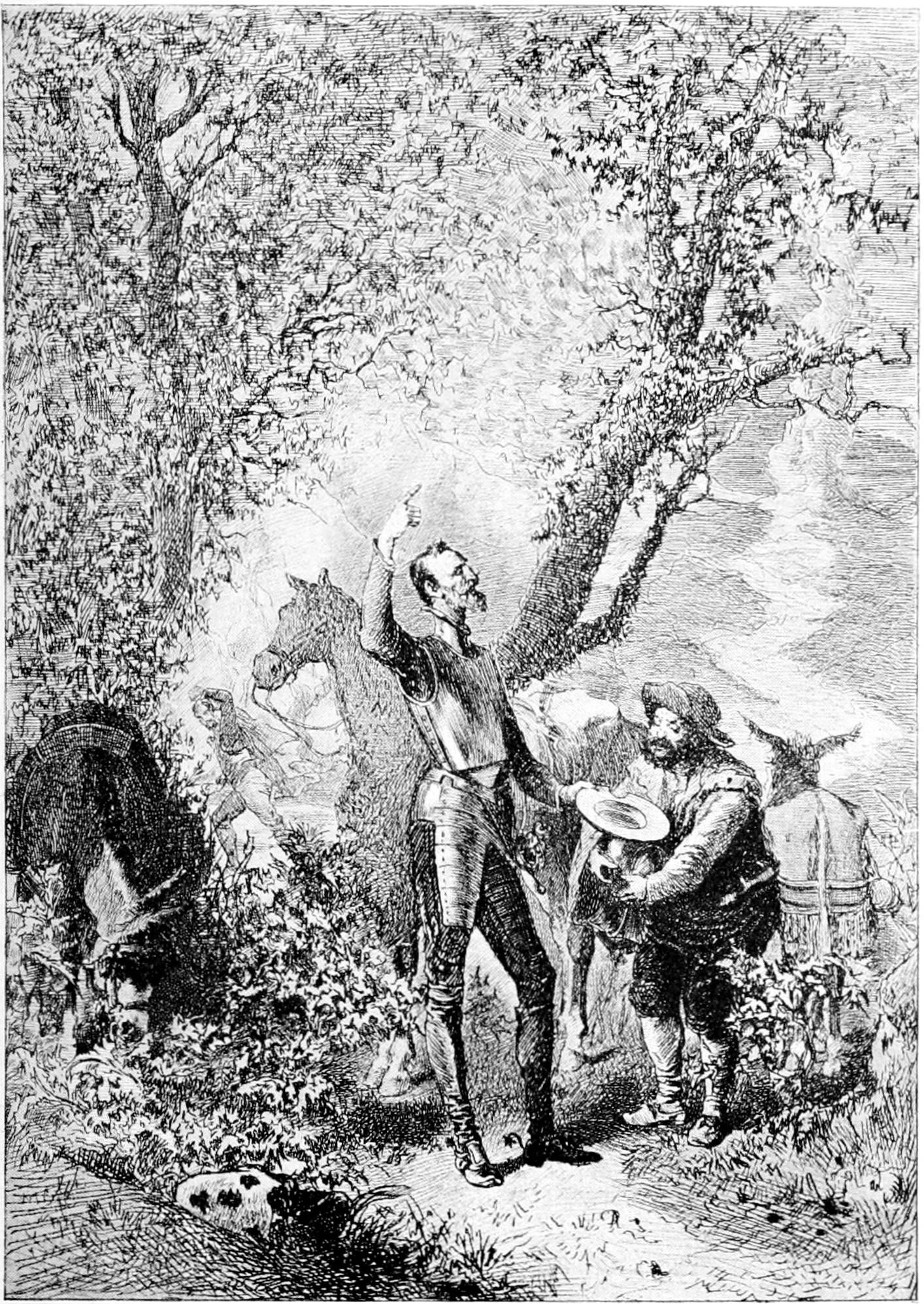
Don Quixote extols the basin that he takes for Mambrino's helmet.

Cervantes, in his novel Don Quixote de la Mancha, tells us of a barber who was caught in the rain, and to protect his hat clapped his brazen basin on his head. Don Quixote insisted that this basin was the enchanted helmet of the Moorish king. Don Quixote wishes to obtain the helmet in order to make himself invulnerable. In the musical Man of La Mancha, an entire song is constructed around the titular character's search for the helmet and his encounter with the barber.

There is a reference in Patrick Leigh Fermor's Mani to Mambrino with respect to a very large straw hat worn by a Greek man in the 1930s. "[The man] came loping towards us under his giant Mambrino's helmet of straw."

Chapter 2 of George Eliot's novel "Middlemarch" is headed by a paragraph from "Don Quixote" in which the helmet of Mambrino is referred to.

== See also ==
- Cap of invisibility
