= María de Quiñones =

Spanish book printer (died 1669)

- Died: 1669
- Occupation: printer

María de Quiñones (d. 1669) was a Spanish book printer.

She married the printer Juan de la Cuesta in 1602. In 1607, her spouse left for India, and gave her a power of attorney to manage his printing company in his absence. She remained in charge until 1666. Her company was one of the most successful in Spain and responsible for the publication of a large number of the literature of the Spanish Golden Age, including authors such as Lope de Vega, Tirso de Molina and Pedro Calderón de la Barca.

A street in Madrid is named Quiñones after her.

== See also ==
- List of women printers and publishers before 1800
