= John Ormsby (translator) =

British translator

- Born: 25 April 1829; Gortnor Abbey, County Mayo
- Died: 30 October 1895 (aged 66)
- Resting place: Ramsgate Cemetery, Ramsgate, Kent
- Writing career
- Notable work: translation of Don Quixote

John Ormsby (1829–1895) was a nineteenth-century Anglo-Irish translator. He is most famous for his 1885 English translation of Miguel de Cervantes' Don Quixote de la Mancha, perhaps the most scholarly and accurate English translation of the novel up to that time. It is so precise that Samuel Putnam, who published his own English translation of the novel in 1949, faults Ormsby for duplicating Cervantes' pronouns so closely that the meaning of the sentences sometimes becomes confusing.

== Life ==
John Ormsby was born at Gortnor Abbey, co. Mayo, on 25 April 1829. He was the eldest son of George Ormsby (died 1836), a captain in the 3rd dragoons and high sheriff of co. Mayo in 1827, and his wife Marianne, third daughter of Humphrey Jones of Mullinabro, co. Kilkenny. He was a direct descendant of the Ormsby family which migrated from Lincolnshire to co. Mayo in the reign of Elizabeth I. On the death of both parents during his childhood, he was placed under the guardianship of Denis Brown, dean of Emly. He was educated at Dr. Roman's private school at Seapoint, and at Trinity College, Dublin, where he graduated B.A. in 1843, and he won a silver medal for chemistry at the University of London in 1846. Two years later, he was admitted at the Middle Temple, but he was never called to the bar. His literary tastes were developed early, and he contributed papers of travel to Fraser's Magazine, to the Saturday Review, and to the early numbers of the Cornhill and the Pall Mall Gazette. He lived at this period in King's Bench Walk in the Temple, a "denizen of Bohemia, but of the cultivated and scholarlike Bohemia", and his friends often remarked that he would be an "excellent representative of Warrington in 'Pendennis'". He was extremely well read in eighteenth-century literature, and especially in Defoe, Fielding, and Boswell.

He was a member of the Alpine Club almost from its inauguration in 1858. He was one of the first party to climb the Pic de Grivola in August 1859, and he contributed an amusing paper on "The Ascent of the Grivola" to the second volume of the second series of Peaks, Passes, and Glaciers, by members of the Alpine Club (1862).

In 1864, he published Autumn Rambles in North Africa, travel sketches from La Grande Kabylie and Tunis during 1863–4, originally contributed for the most part to Fraser, with illustrations by the author. In 1876, he collected in volume form his Stray Papers, including some amusing pieces, "Sandford and Merton", "Mme. Tussaud's", and "Swift on the Turf". In 1879, he published a translation from Spanish of the Poem of the Cid, dedicated to Pascual de Gayangos.

He died on 30 October 1895, and was buried in Ramsgate Cemetery in Kent.

== His translation of Don Quixote ==
Ormsby's translation has seen more editions than any other nineteenth-century English version of the novel, having been included in the Heritage Book Club series of great novels, and in the Great Books of the Western World set. The contemporaneous translations by Alexander James Duffield (1881) and Henry Edward Watts (1888) have been virtually forgotten.

Ormsby not only translates the novel; he provides a long and informative introduction with a brief analysis of all the major English versions of Don Quixote up to then (except for the Duffield version), as well as explaining the conceptual choices that he himself made in translating the novel, in terms of affectation, for example, or using the simplest everyday language. He also features a short biography of Cervantes in his introduction, as well as providing his own controversial analysis of the work. Ormsby refutes the widely accepted view that Don Quixote is a sad novel with allegorical meanings and a pessimistic philosophy, and states that because Cervantes himself declared it to be a satire against books of chivalry, it is primarily only that, although it does contain much observation on human character. Ormsby also refutes, in addition, the commonly held view that Don Quixote is an innately noble person, stating that his nobility of character is an attitude that he assumes simply to imitate his knightly heroes. An 1886 edition of the Quarterly Review, published only a year after Ormsby's translation was first issued, took him to task for his limited interpretation of the novel and of Don Quixote's character, while praising the accuracy of the translation.

Even while referring to Don Quixote as a "great classic", Ormsby was far from an unquestioning admirer of Cervantes' work, at times criticizing the author's writing habits and linguistic style. He wrote, for example: "Never was great work so neglected by its author. That it was written carelessly, hastily, and by fits and starts, was not always his fault, but it seems clear he never read what he sent to the press." He wrote two versions of his introductory analysis, a longer version published in the original 1885 edition of his translation, in which he severely criticized Cervantes' writing style, and a more concise version (the one published in most editions of the translation), in which some of the criticisms have been omitted.

Ormsby also provided his own footnotes for his translation. They are usually missing in Internet versions of his translation.

A revised version of Ormsby's translation, by Kenneth Douglas and Joseph Jones, with new introduction and notes, was published by W.W. Norton in 1981 (ISBN 0-393-09018-3).
