= Juan de la Cuesta =

Spanish printer

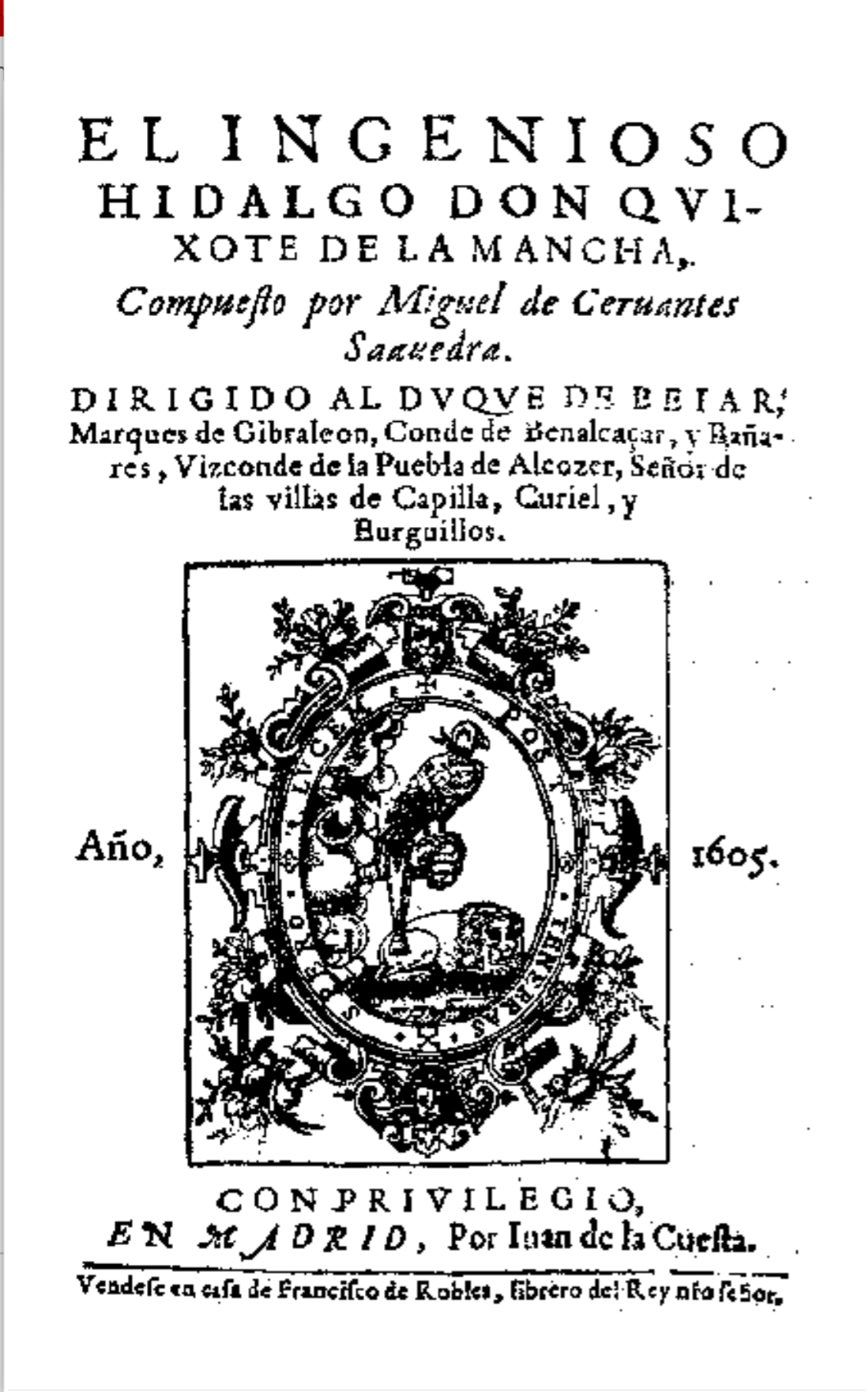
Title page of the first (1605) edition of Cervantes' Don Quijote.

Juan de la Cuesta (died 1627) was a Spanish printer known for printing (not publishing) the first editions of Don Quixote de la Mancha (1605) and the Novelas ejemplares (1613), by Miguel de Cervantes, as well as the works of other leading figures of Spain's Golden Age, such as Lope de Vega.

Although he may previously have worked in Segovia, and there was also a Juan de la Cuesta based in Alcalá de Henares in 1589 (although the latter may refer to another person), it was not until 1599 that he started working in Madrid, taken on as manager of the printing shop owned by María Rodríguez de Rivalde, widow of the printers Juan Íñiguez de Lequerica and Pedro Madrigal.

An inventory carried out of the premises in September 1595, just a few years before he was taken on to run the business for the woman who would become his mother-in-law, referred to six presses, and the year they started printing the Quixote, 1604, it had twenty employees.

He married María de Quiñones in 1604, and in 1607 he left Madrid, abandoning his pregnant wife, who would, after her husband's death, take over the business and become an important printer in her own right.

Cuesta's print shop, at 87 Calle Atocha in Madrid, has been restored, and is now the headquarters of the Sociedad Cervantina, founded by Luis Astrana Marín in 1953. It has a replica of Cuesta's printing press. It was officially opened as a museum by the king and queen of Spain in 1987.
