= Miguel Esteban =

Coordinates: 39°31′N 3°05′W

- municipality
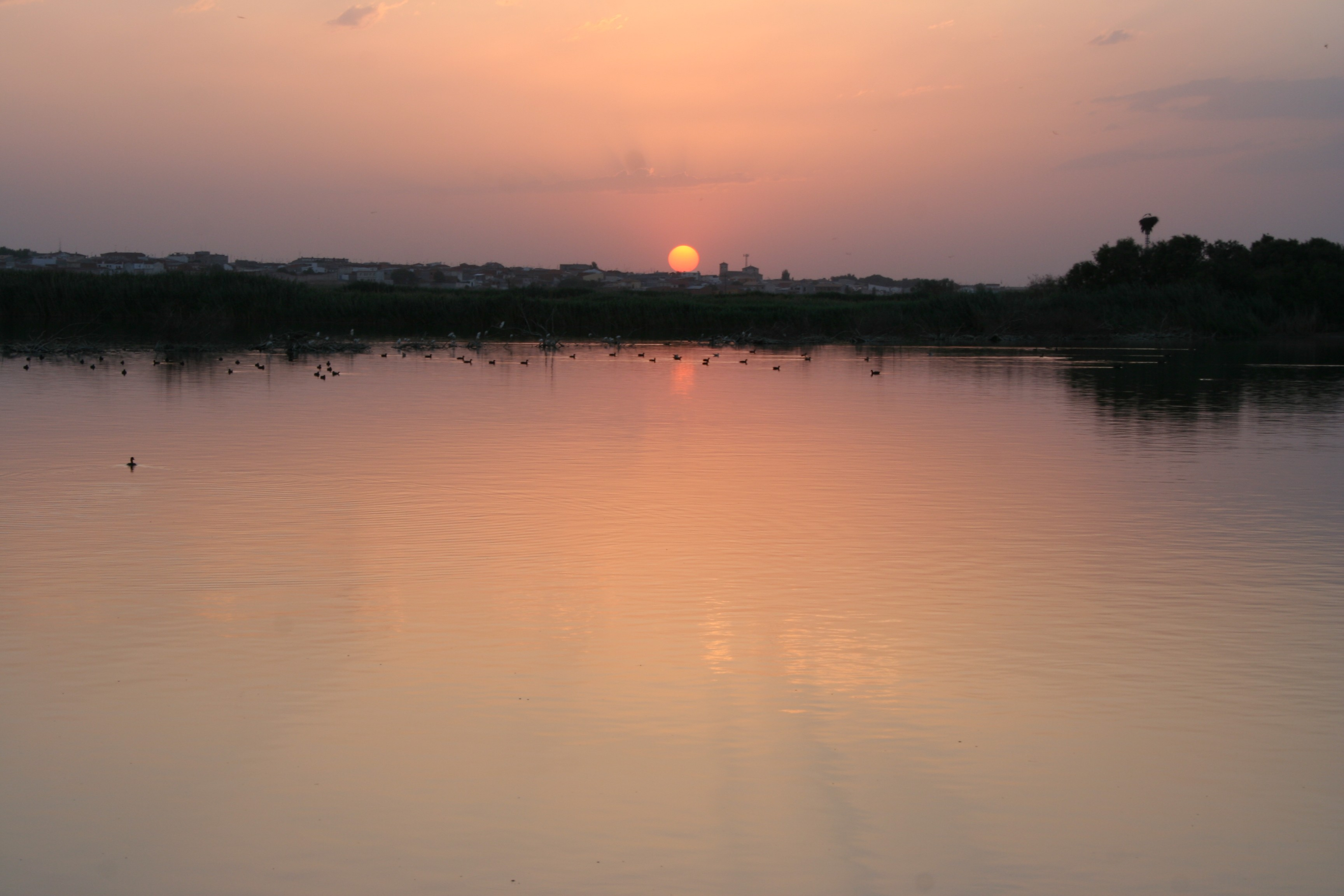
- Sunset in the Miguel Esteban lagoon.

- Coat of arms
- Interactive map of Miguel Esteban
- Country: Spain
- Autonomous community: Castile-La Mancha
- Province: Toledo
- Municipality: Miguel Esteban

Area
  - Total: 93 km^{2} (36 sq mi)
- Elevation: 610 m (2,000 ft)

Population (2025-01-01)
  - Total: 4,751
  - Density: 51/km^{2} (130/sq mi)
- Time zone: UTC+1 (CET)
  - Summer (DST): UTC+2 (CEST)

Miguel Esteban is a municipality located in the province of Toledo, Castile-La Mancha, Spain. According to the 2006 census (INE), the municipality has a population of 5435 inhabitants.
