= Don Quixote (character) =

Alonso Quijano
- Don Quixote character
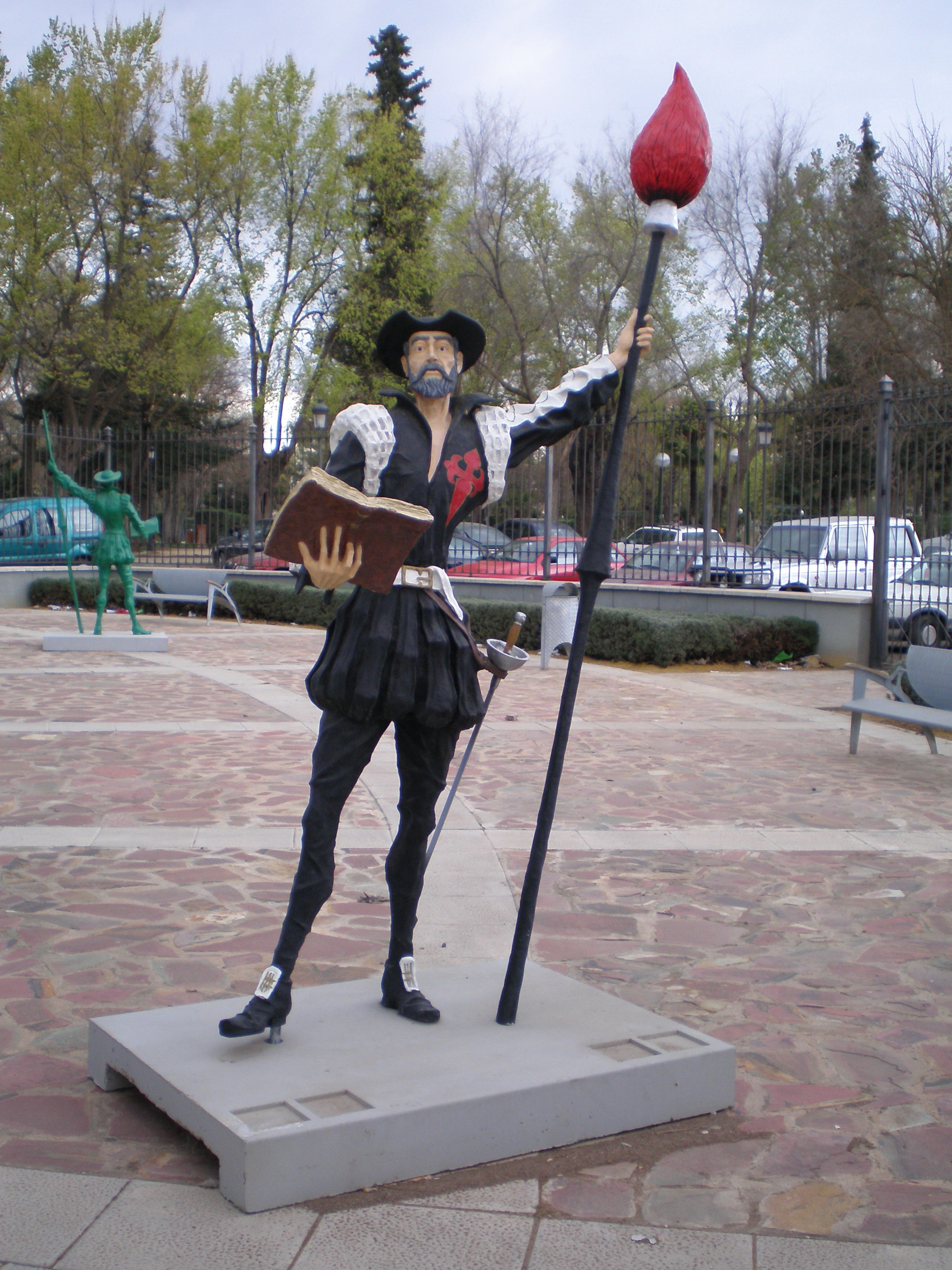
- Statue of Don Quixote in Ciudad Real
- Created by: Miguel de Cervantes
- Portrayed by: Feodor Chaliapin; Nikolay Cherkasov; Peter O'Toole; John Lithgow; Fernando Rey; Fernando Fernán Gómez; Rafael Rivelles; Ryu Seung-gon

In-universe information
- Gender: Male
- Title: Hidalgo
- Occupation: Landowner
- Religion: Roman Catholic
- Nationality: Spanish

Alonso Quijano (Spanish: [aˈlonso kiˈxano]; spelled Quixano in English and in the Spanish of Cervantes' day, pronounced [aˈlons̺o kiˈʃano]), more commonly known by his pseudonym Don Quixote, is a fictional character and the protagonist of the novel Don Quixote de la Mancha by Miguel de Cervantes.

At the outset of the work (Chapter 1 of Part I), we are informed that there is confusion about what his name is. Some (imaginary) authors, the text says, disagree about whether his name was Quijada ("jaw") or Quesada, although by reasoning ("conjeturas verosímiles") one could arrive at the name Quijana. At this point, Quijano is not even mentioned as a possibility, nor is Alonso, leading the reader to one of the most notable yet purposefully obfuscated examples of an unreliable narrator. In Chapter 49 of Part I he tells us that he was a direct descendant of Gutierre Quijada. His "real" name of Alonso Quijano is only revealed in the last chapter of Part II, and with the stated purpose of demonstrating the falseness of the spurious Part II of the pseudonymous Alonso Fernández de Avellaneda, in which work the protagonist is Martín Quijada.

Knights in the chivalric books Alonso Quijano read, which reading caused his madness, have nicknames. In Chapter 19 of Part I his squire Sancho Panza invents his first nickname, the hard-to-translate "Caballero de la Triste Figura": knight of miserable (triste) appearance (figura). Sancho explains its meaning: Don Quixote is the worst-looking man he has ever seen, thin from hunger and missing most of his teeth. After an encounter with lions, Don Quixote himself invents his second nickname, "Knight of the Lions", in Part II, Chapter 17. Both titles reference famous knights: Ysaie le Triste, the son of Tristan and Iseult, and Yvain, the Knight of the Lion. Many scholars argue that Alonso Quijano serves as a literary mirror to Christopher Columbus, as both men were driven by an obsessive devotion to "romance" texts that skewed their perception of reality.

== In popular culture ==
Don Quixote appears in Man of La Mancha, a 1965 musical inspired by the book.

The 2023 Korean indie gacha strategy game Limbus Company features Don Quixote as the antagonist of the 7th chapter. Sancho, under the name of Don Quixote and adapted as female, is one of the 13 main protagonists.
