= Henry Edward Watts =

British journalist and author (1826–1904)

Henry Edward Watts (15 October 1826 – 7 November 1904) was a British journalist and author on Spanish topics.

== Life ==
Born at Calcutta on 15 October 1826, he was son of Henry Cecil Watts, head clerk in the police office there, and his wife Emily Weldon. He was educated at a private school in Greenwich, and then at Exeter grammar school. At age 20 he returned to Calcutta.

After working as a journalist for some years, Watts went to Australia in search of an elder brother who had gone to the gold-diggings. After an unsuccessful venture in mining, he joined the staff of the Melbourne Argus, and became its editor in 1859.

Back in England, Watts worked for a short-lived Liberal newspaper at York, where he contracted smallpox. He moved on to London, and around 1868 joined the Standard, acting as leader-writer and sub-editor in the colonial and literary departments. At this period he was also home correspondent for the Melbourne Argus.

Watts occupied rooms in Pall Mall before settling at 52 Bedford Gardens, Campden Hill. He was an original member of the Savile Club, and visited Spain with his friend Carlisle Macartney. Unmarried, he died of cancer on 7 November 1904.

== Works ==
Watts is best known for his translation of Don Quixote (1888; revised edit. 1895), begun in collaboration with Alexander James Duffield. The first edition contained "a new life" of Miguel de Cervantes, whom he idealised, which was expanded and issued separately in 1895. He also wrote the biographical sketch Life of Miguel de Cervantes for the "Great Writers series" (1891), an essay on Francisco de Quevedo for an English edition of Pablo de Segovia, illustrated by Daniel Vierge (1892), and Spain (1893) for the "Story of the Nations" series.

He was a contributor to the Westminster Review, Encyclopædia Britannica, Blackwood's Magazine,Fraser's Magazine, Saturday Review, and St. James's Gazette.

== Notes ==
Attribution

This article incorporates text from a publication now in the public domain: Lee, Sidney, ed. (1912). "Watts, Henry Edward". Dictionary of National Biography (2nd supplement). Vol. 3. London: Smith, Elder & Co.
