= 1839 in art =

Events from the year 1839 in art.

== Events ==
- January 9 – The French Academy of Sciences announces the Daguerreotype photography process.
- January 25 – H. Fox Talbot shows his "photogenic drawings" at the Royal Institution in London.
- March 1 – The Salon of 1839 opens at the Louvre in Paris
- May 6 – The Royal Academy Exhibition of 1839 opens at the National Gallery in London
- c. October – Robert Cornelius takes a daguerreotype self-portrait, the earliest known existing photographic portrait of a human in America.
- Honoré de Balzac's novel Pierre Grassou concerns an artist who lives off forgeries.

== Works ==
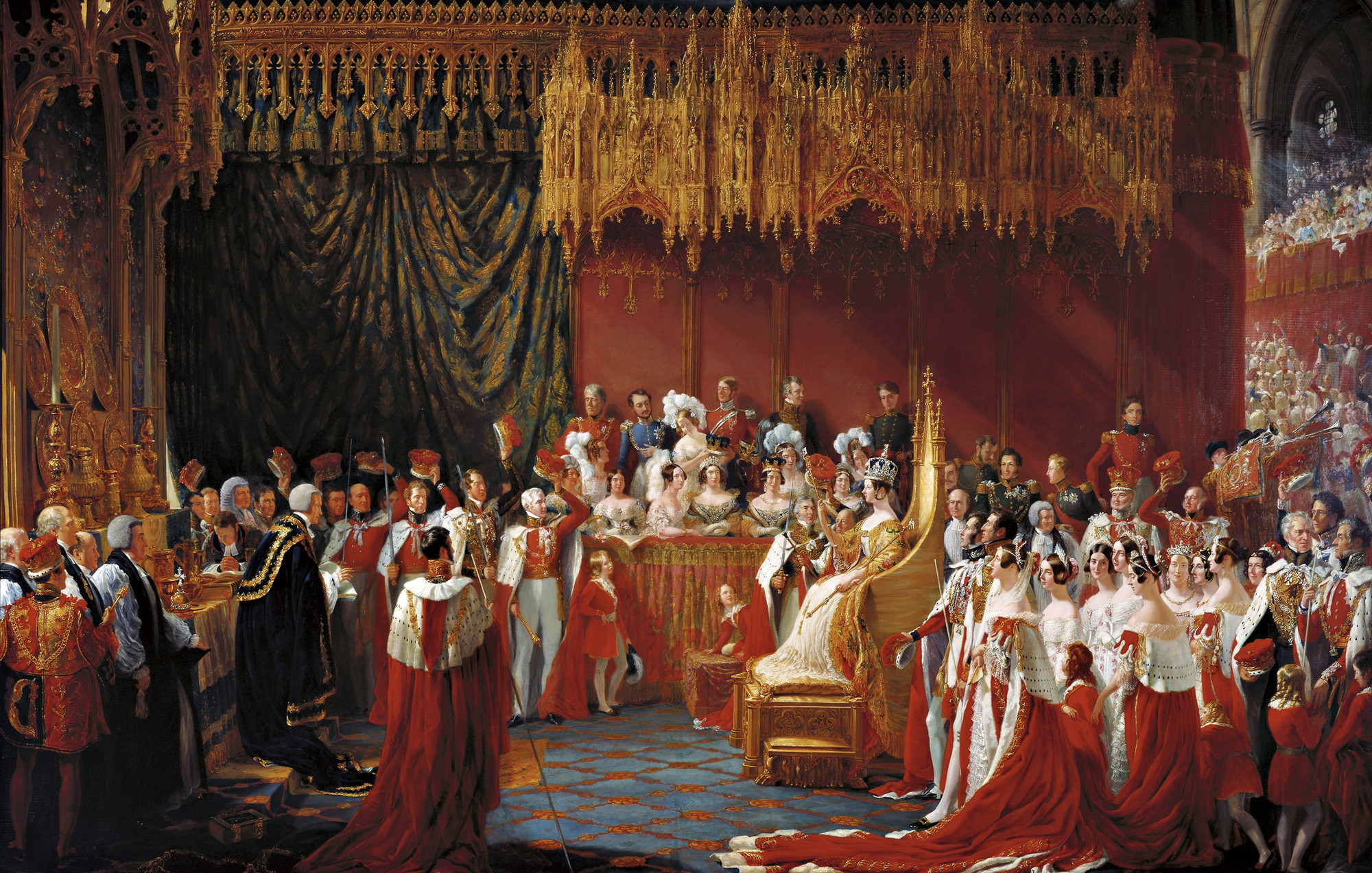
Hayter – The Coronation of Queen Victoria.

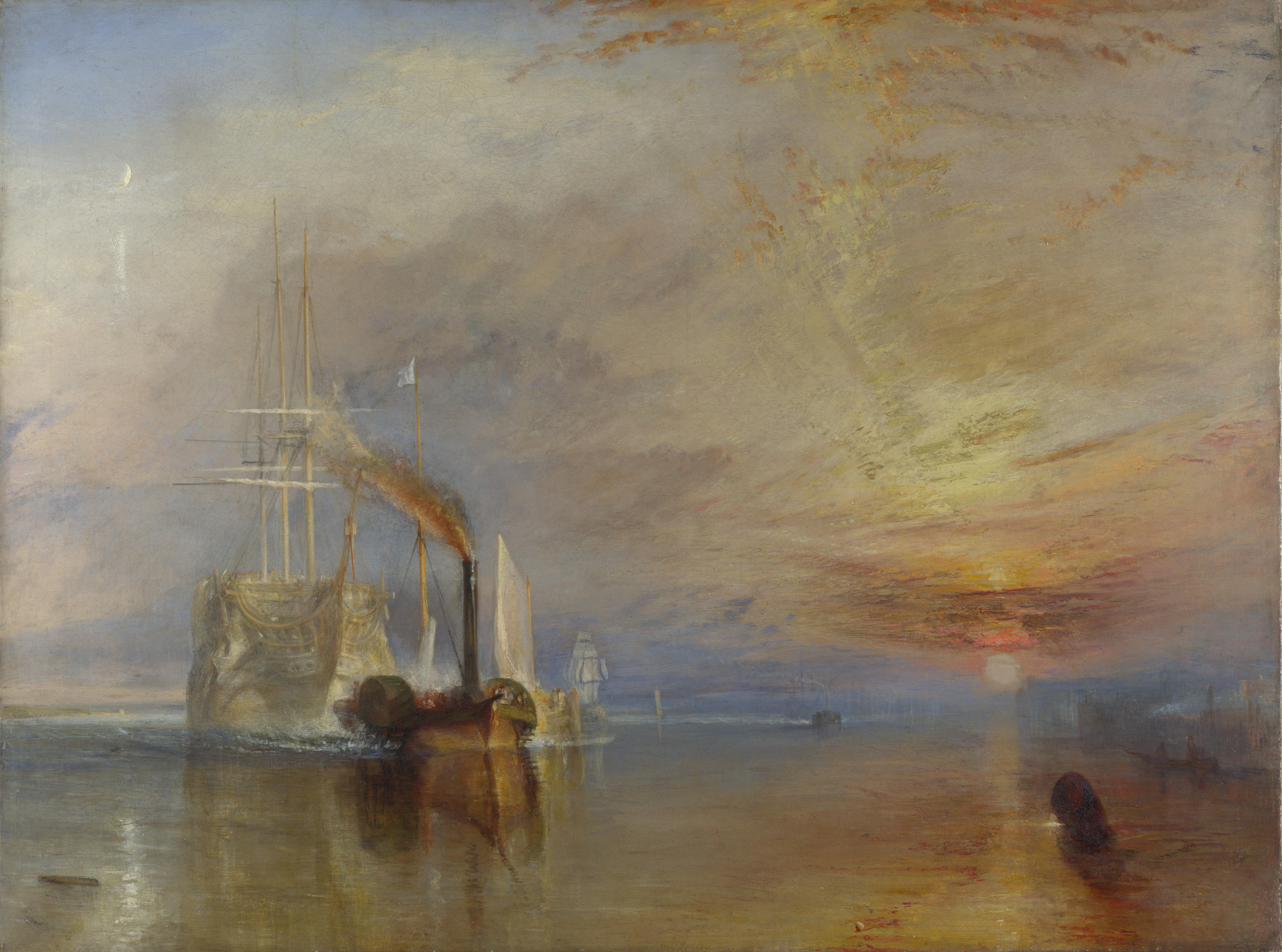
Turner – The Fighting Temeraire

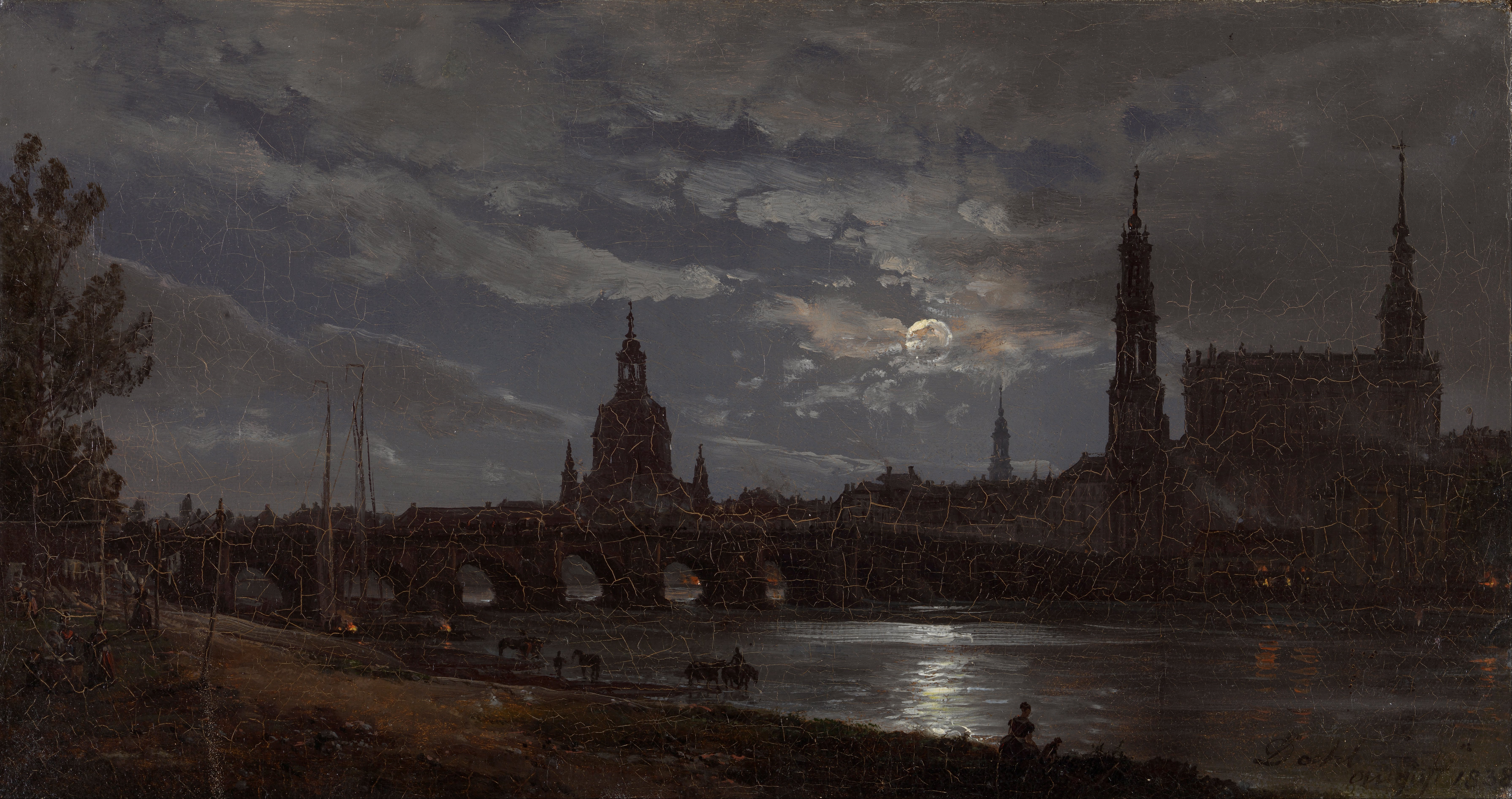
View of Dresden by Moonlight by Johan Christian Dahl

- Jean Alaux – The Battle of Denain
- Thomas Jones Barker – The Bride of Death
- John Bell – Babes in the Wood (sculpture)
- Giovanni Battista Borghesi – Portrait of Marie Louise
- Sara Anne Bright – The Leaf (photogenic drawing)
- Johan Christian Dahl – View of Dresden by Moonlight
- Eugène Delacroix
  - Hamlet and Horatio in the Graveyard
  - Jewish Wedding in Morocco
- Charles Lock Eastlake – Christ Blessing Little Children
- Francis Grant
  - Portrait of Countess Jermyn
  - A Shooting Party at Ranton Abbey
- Francesco Hayez – Reclining Odalisque
- George Hayter – The Coronation of Queen Victoria
- John Callcott Horsley – The Rival Performers
- Eugène Isabey – The Battle of Texel
- Johann Peter Krafft – The Declaration of Victory After the Battle of Leipzig
- Jean-Charles Langlois – The Battle of Smolensk
- Edwin Landseer –
  - Dignity and Impudence
  - Isaac van Amburgh and his Animals
- Charles-Philippe Larivière – The Battle of Castillon
- Henri Lehmann – Portrait of Franz Liszt
- Charles Robert Leslie – Dulcinea del Toboso
- Daniel Maclise
  - Portrait of Charles Dickens
  - Robin Hood and His Merry Men Entertaining Richard the Lionheart in Sherwood Forest
- John Martin – The Coronation of Queen Victoria
- William Mulready
  - Fair Time
  - The Sonnet
- Thomas Phillips
  - Portrait of the Earl of Egremont
  - Portrait of Thomas Arnold
- Carl Spitzweg – The Poor Poet
- J. M. W. Turner
  - Ancient Rome – Agrippina Landing with the Ashes of Germanicus
  - Modern Rome – Campo Vaccino
  - Cicero at His Villa at Tusculum
  - The Fighting Temeraire
- Horace Vernet – The Ballad of Lenore
- Peter von Hess – The Entry of King Otto of Greece into Athens
- Thomas Webster – Football
- David Wilkie
  - Grace Before Meat
  - Sir David Baird Discovering the Body of Sultan Tipoo Sahib
- William Wyon – Una and the Lion (design for five pounds British gold coin)

== Births ==
- January 19 – Paul Cézanne, French painter (died 1906)
- March 16 – John Butler Yeats, Irish painter (died 1922)
- May 24 – Arthur Quartley, painter (died 1886)
- June 9 – Joseph Paelinck, Belgian painter (born 1781)
- September 1 – Charles Edward Perugini, English painter (died 1918)
- October 2 – Hans Thoma, German painter (died 1924)
- October 29 – Kate Dickens Perugini, English painter (died 1929)
- October 30 – Alfred Sisley, French impressionist painter (died 1899)
- November 16 – William De Morgan, English ceramic artist (died 1917)
- November 20 – Christian Wilberg, painter (died 1882)
- date unknown – François Sallé, French realist painter (died 1899)

== Deaths ==
- January 12 – Joseph Anton Koch, Austrian painter of the German Romantic movement (born 1768)
- January 14 – John Wesley Jarvis, American painter (born 1781)
- January 28 – Sir William Beechey, English portrait painter (born 1753)
- February 6 – François Louis Thomas Francia, French shorescape watercolorist (born 1772)
- February 8 – Giovanni Cendramini, Italian painter and engraver (born 1760)
- February 21 – John Charles Felix Rossi, English sculptor (born 1769)
- June 2 – Wijnand Nuijen, Dutch land- and seascape painter (born 1813)
- June 4 – Cornelia Scheffer, Dutch painter and portrait miniaturist (born 1769)
- July 8 – John Laporte, English landscape painter and etcher (born 1761)
- September 4 – Hendrik Voogd, Dutch painter and printmaker active in Italy (born 1768)
- September 10 – Pieter Fontijn, Dutch painter and drawer (born 1773)
- September 30 – John Thirtle, English watercolour painter and frame-maker (born 1777)
- November 15 – Giocondo Albertolli, Swiss-born architect, painter and sculptor active in Italy (born 1743)
- December – William Sadler, Irish landscape painter (born 1782)
- December 22 – Cornelis van Spaendonck, Dutch painter (born 1756)
- date unknown – Paolo Vincenzo Bonomini, Italian portrait and caricature painter (born 1757)
