= 1773 in art =

Events from the year 1773 in art.

== Events ==
- 24 April – The Royal Academy Exhibition of 1773 opens in London
- 25 July – Francisco Goya marries Josefa Bayeu.
- 25 August – The Salon of 1773 opens at the Louvre in Paris
- Ulrika Pasch elected in to the Royal Swedish Academy of Arts

== Paintings ==
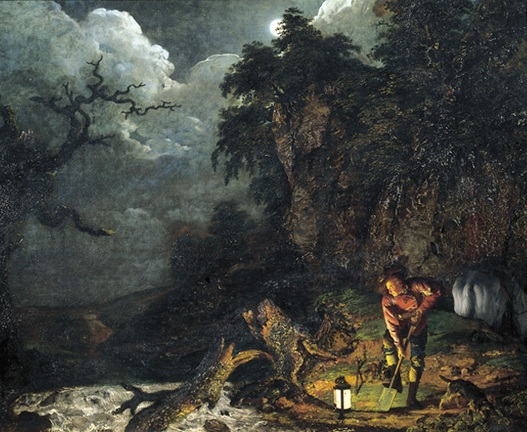
Joseph Wright – The Earthstopper

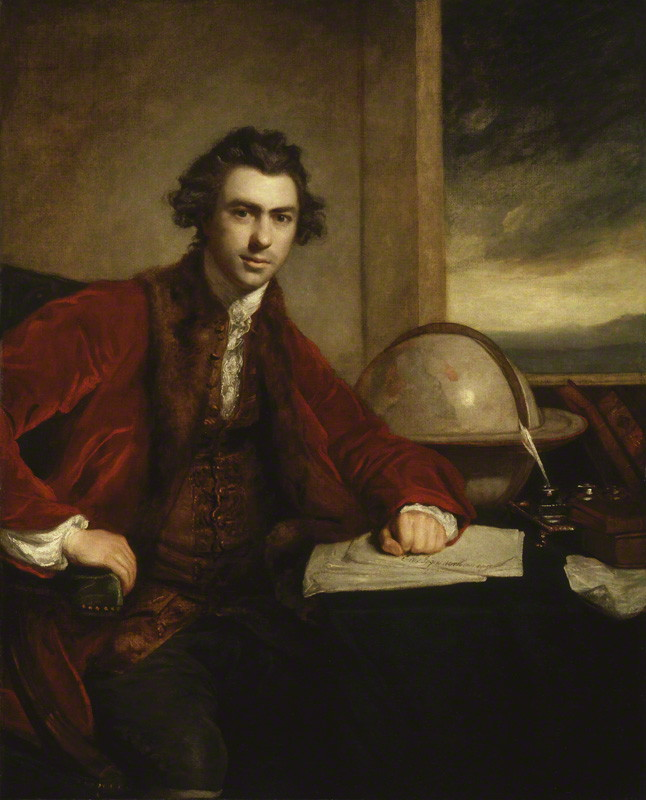
Portrait of Joseph Banks by Joshua Reynolds.

- John Singleton Copley – Portrait of Mrs Winslow
- Nathaniel Dance-Holland – Self-Portrait
- François-Hubert Drouais – Portrait of Marie Antoinette
- Dmitry Levitzky – Portraits of the young ladies of the Smolny Institute in Saint Petersburg
- Charles Willson Peale – Family Group portrait
- Sir Joshua Reynolds
  - Portrait of Joseph Banks
  - Portrait of Francesco Bartolozzi
  - Portrait of the Earl of Bute
  - Lady Anne Luttrell, The Duchess of Cumberland
- Hubert Robert – The École de Chirurgie Under Construction
- Benjamin West – The Wife of Arminius Brought Captive to Germanicus
- Joseph Wright of Derby – Earthstopper on the Banks of the Derwent
- Melchior Wyrsch – Reginald Pole Carew
- Joseph-Marie Vien – Saint Louis Handing Over the Regency to His Mother
- Joseph Vernet
  - A Landscape at Sunset
  - A Shipwreck in Stormy Seas

== Births ==
- January 5 – Pieter Fontijn, Dutch painter and drawer (died 1839)
- January 31 – Luigi Pichler, German-Italian artist in engraved gems (died 1854)
- July 7 – Moses Haughton the Younger, English engraver and painter of portrait miniatures (died 1849)
- December 9 – Marianne Ehrenström, Swedish writer, singer, painter, pianist, culture personality, and memorialist (died 1867)
- December 16 – José Aparicio, Spanish painter of the Neoclassic period (died 1838)
- date unknown
  - Edward Wedlake Brayley, English enameller, topographer, and writer (died 1854)
  - John Comerford, Irish miniature painter (died 1832)
  - Carl Conjola, German landscape painter (died 1831)
  - Luigi Rados, Italian engraver (died 1840)
  - Naitō Toyomasa, Japanese sculptor of netsuke from Tanba Province (died 1856)

== Deaths ==
- February 15 – Anna Maria Barbara Abesch, Swiss reverse glass painter (born 1706)
- March 1 – Luigi Vanvitelli, Italian engineer and architect (born 1700)
- March 26 – Johan Ross the Elder, Swedish painter (born 1695)
- April 20 – Hubert-François Gravelot, French illustrator (born 1699)
- July 2 – Dirk van der Burg, Dutch artist, landscape painter and watercolourist (born 1721)
- August 19 – Francesco Zahra, Maltese painter (born 1710)
- August 30 – Nicolau Nasoni, artist and architect (born 1691)
- September 13 – Anton Janša, Slovene beekeeper and painter (born 1734)
- December 4 – Anton Losenko, Ukrainian-Russian Neoclassical painter who specialized in historical subjects and portraits (born 1737)
- December 22 – Georg Friedrich Strass, Alsatian jeweler and inventor of imitation gemstones and the rhinestone (born 1701)
- date unknown
  - Gerhard Bockman, Dutch portrait painter and mezzotint engraver (born 1686)
  - Thomas-Joachim Hébert, French ébéniste and furniture designer (born 1687)
  - Jakob Klukstad, Norwegian wood carver and painter (born 1705)
  - Antonio Rossi – Italian painter of the late-Baroque or Rococo period (born 1700)
  - József Lénárd Wéber, Hungarian sculptor (born 1702)
  - Marcos Zapata, Peruvian Quechua painter (born 1710)
