= 1702 in art =

Events from the year 1702 in art.

== Events ==
- Completion of the Nyatapola Temple in Nepal by King Bhupatindra Malla.

== Paintings ==
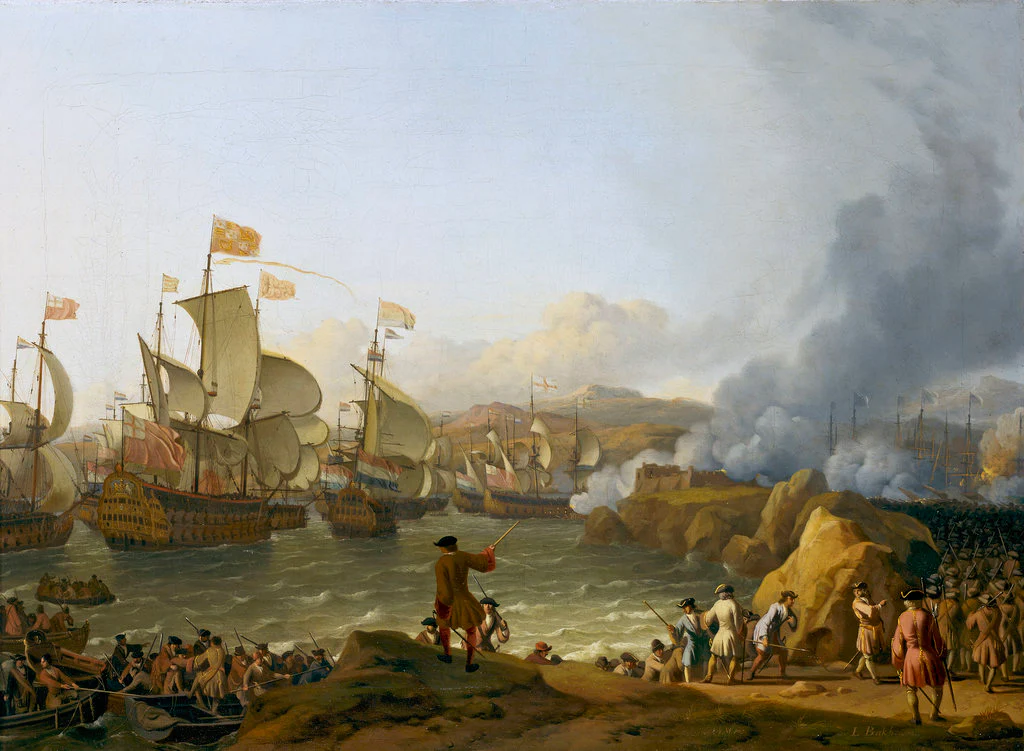
Bakhuizen - The Battle of Vigo Bay

- Ludolf Bakhuizen – The Battle of Vigo Bay
- Ogata Kōrin – Irises
- Sebastiano Ricci
  - Allegory of the princely virtues (Schönbrunn Palace, Vienna)
  - Assumption of the Virgin (Gemäldegalerie Alte Meister, Dresden)

== Births ==
- July 31 – Jean Denis Attiret, French Jesuit missionary and painter (died 1768)
- August 15 – Francesco Zuccarelli, painter, elected to the Venetian Academy in 1763 (died 1788)
- December 22 – Jean-Étienne Liotard, Swiss-French painter (died 1789)
- date unknown
  - Matthijs Accama, Dutch historical and emblematical subjects painter (died 1783)
  - Joseph Aved, also called le Camelot (The Hawker) and Avet le Batave (The Dutch Avet), French Rococo portraitist (died 1766)
  - Pierre-Alexandre Aveline, French engraver, portraitist, illustrator, and printmaker (died 1760)
  - Johann Wolfgang Baumgartner, German painter (died 1761)
  - Placido Costanzi, Italian painter of the Costanzi family of artists (died 1759)
  - Ercole Lelli – Italian painter of became director of the Academy at Bologna (died 1762)
  - Carlo Marchionni, Italian sculptor and architect (died 1786)
  - Andrey Matveyev, Russian portraitist (died 1739)
  - Samuel Scott, English marine and topographical painter and etcher (died 1772)
  - James Seymour, English painter known for his equestrian art (died 1752)
  - József Lénárd Wéber, Hungarian sculptor (died 1773)

== Deaths ==
- May 10 – Antonio Gherardi, painter, sculptor and architect (born 1638)
- May 17 – Jan Wyck, Dutch painter of military subjects (born 1652)
- July 22 – Filippo Parodi, sculptor (born 1630)
- date unknown
  - Federico Agnelli, Italian engraver and printer, active in Milan (born 1626)
  - Isidoro Arredondo, Spanish painter (born 1653)
  - Jan de Baen, Dutch portrait painter (born 1633)
  - Nicolaes de Vree, Dutch Golden Age painter (born 1645)
  - Marcellus Laroon, Dutch painter and engraver, active in England (born 1653)
  - Didrik Möllerum, Finnish painter (born 1642)
  - Bernardo Racchetti, Italian painter of imaginary vedute (born 1639)
