= Fontein =

Fontein is a Dutch toponymic surname meaning "fountain" in modern Dutch, presumably originating with people living near a fountain, source or well. Common spelling variants are Fonteijn, Fonteyn, Fontijn and Fontyn, each pronounced [fɔnˈtɛin] in Dutch. People with this surname include:

- Adriaen Fonteyn (1626–1661), Flemish-born Dutch painter
- Andrew Fontein (born 1990), American soccer goalkeeper
- George Salto Fontein (1890–1963), Dutch chess master
- Guido Fonteyn (born 1943), Flemish journalist
- Jacqueline Fontyn (born 1930), Belgian composer, pianist and music educator
- Jan Fontein (1927–2007), Dutch art historian and museum director
- Maarten Fontein (born 1952), Dutch football club director
- Margot Fonteyn, stage name of Margaret Evelyn de Arias (1919–1991), English ballerina
- Mathieu Fonteyn (born 1985), Belgian swimmer
- Nouchka Fontijn (born 1987), Dutch boxer, European champion in women's middleweight
- Pieter Fontijn (1773–1839), Dutch portrait and miniature painter and drawer
- Sam Fonteyn (born Samuel Soden, c. 1925–1991), English composer-pianist

== See also ==
- Fountain Cave, a cave in Arikok National Park, Aruba
