= Isaiah Lukens =

American inventor and clockmaker (1779–1846)

Isaiah Quinby Lukens
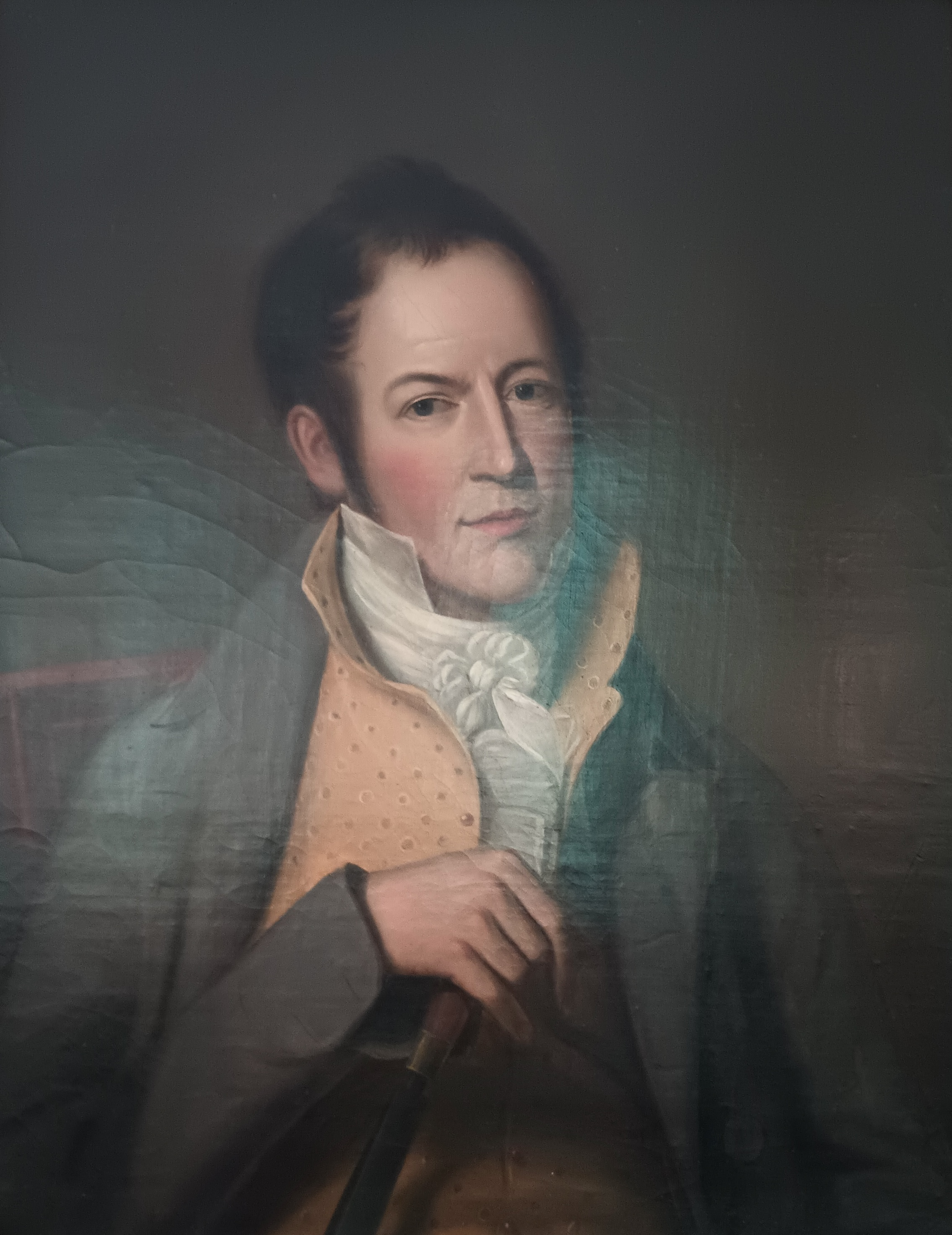
- Portrait attributed to Rembrandt Peale, ca.1800
- Born: August 24, 1779; Horsham, Pennsylvania, U.S.
- Died: November 12, 1846 (aged 67); Philadelphia, Pennsylvania, U.S.
- Occupations: Clockmaker, inventor

Isaiah Quinby Lukens (24 August 1779 – 12 November 1846) was an American clockmaker, gunsmith, machinist, and inventor from southeastern Pennsylvania. He was a founding member and first vice president of the Franklin Institute in Philadelphia. He was elected to membership in the Academy of Natural Sciences of Philadelphia in June 1812, where he served as curator for multiple decades beginning in 1813. In 1820, he was elected to the American Philosophical Society.

Lukens was blinded in one eye by "a chip of steel when dressing a grindstone" (c.1816), after which he took Joseph Saxton as his assistant. According to George Escol Sellers, whose father was close friends with Lukens, "he called [Saxton] his pupil, and he did honor to his preceptor".

== Early life and family ==
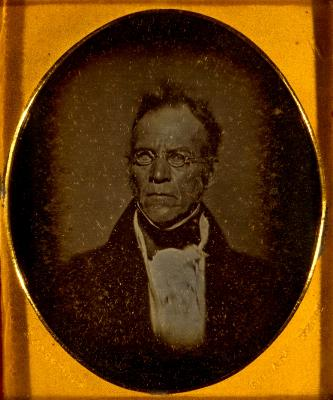
Daguerreotype of Lukens by Robert Cornelius, 1841

Lukens was the son of Seneca Lukens and Sarah (Quinby) Lukens, who were married on June 10, 1777. The family was descended from Jan Lucken, who immigrated to the Pennsylvania colony in October 1683, with Daniel Pastorius, and was one of the original settlers of Germantown. Lukens grew up on his family's farm in Horsham, Montgomery County, Pennsylvania, and learned from his father to construct clocks and watches. He moved to Philadelphia around 1811.

== Personality ==
George Escol Sellers wrote that he was "naturally of a social disposition, although an impediment in his speech made him appear shy and diffident in ladies' society. He called his shop his wife, and he really loved it."

== Scientific activities ==
Lukens used a telescope with a plössl (symmetrical) eyepiece to observe the solar eclipse on September 18, 1838. His data were compiled with the independent observations of 14 other scientists from Philadelphia, and published in The American Journal of Science and Arts in 1840.

== Notable clocks ==
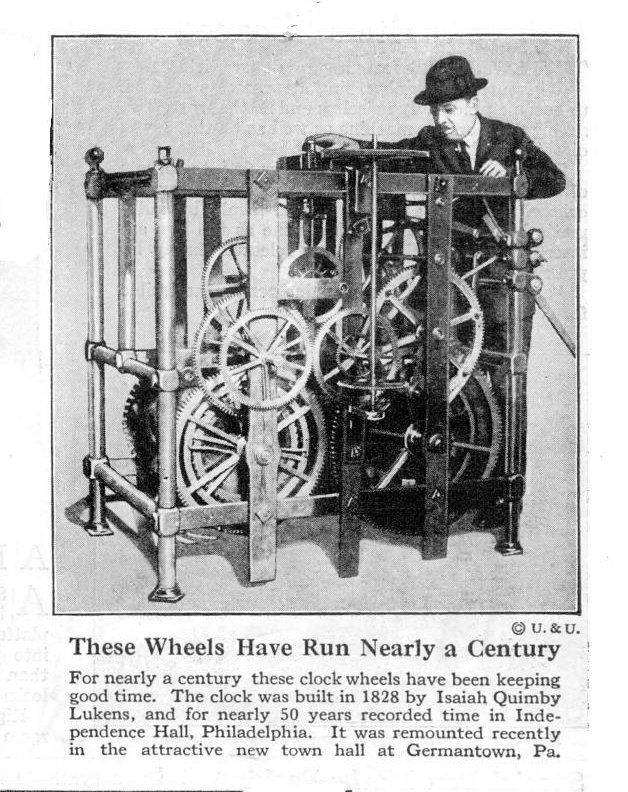
Lukens clock from Philadelphia, it was still running as of 1925.

- Lukens built a clock for the tower of the Pennsylvania State House (now Independence Hall) in 1839, for the price of $5000. It was later removed to Germantown.
- Christ Church in Philadelphia placed an order for a Lukens clock in 1827.
- There is a Lukens clock (c.1840) at the Athenaeum of Philadelphia.

== Inventions, etc. ==
- Lukens Hydrostatic Balance
- Lukens Odometer
- De Luc's "electric columns", as modified by Zamboni
- Surgical instrument for "destroying the stone in the bladder"
- "Big Medicine", an air gun possibly used by Lewis and Clark during the Corps of Discovery expedition
- J. D. Graham, surveyor for the U.S. Corps of Topographical Engineers, used a chronometer made by Lukens: "A mean solar chronometer (No. 141), by Isaiah Lukens, of Philadelphia; beats half-seconds. This chronometer runs eight days without winding.g. It was made by Mr. Lukens about the year 1830 or 1831, while on a visit to London. It is one of the earliest chronometers, I know of, made by an American. It is now an excellent time-keeper."
- Two models of Charles Redheffer's "perpetual motion" machine, the first being deposited in the collection of the Franklin Institute, and the other in Charles Willson Peale's Philadelphia Museum
- Charles Willson Peale's pump at Belfield Farms, described in a letter (November 14, 1814) from Peale to Thomas Jefferson: "some time past I had a well dug in a situation to give Water to my Cattle &c The Ingenious Isaih [sic] Lukens made me a small brass cylender and Boxes to form a pump and also frixion [sic] wheels &c to turn sails to the wind, my wind-mill pumped the Water up in a satisfactory manner, but it was blown down several times, and I make some improvements that prevented the like accidents..."

== Contributions to zoology ==
- Lukens collected the type specimen of Cixidia opaca (Say 1828), a member of the family Achilidae
- Lukens was one of three members of the Academy of Natural Sciences of Philadelphia who nominated John James Audubon for membership in 1824.
