= Paul Goddard =

Paul Goddard may refer to:

- Paul Goddard (footballer) (born 1959), English footballer
- Paul Goddard (actor), English-Australian actor and economist
- Paul Goddard (musician), American bass player
- Paul Beck Goddard (1811–1866), American inventor
