= John Bell (sculptor) =

19th century English sculptor

- Born: 19 August 1811; Hopton
- Died: 14 March 1895; Kensington
- Occupations: Sculptor, ceramist

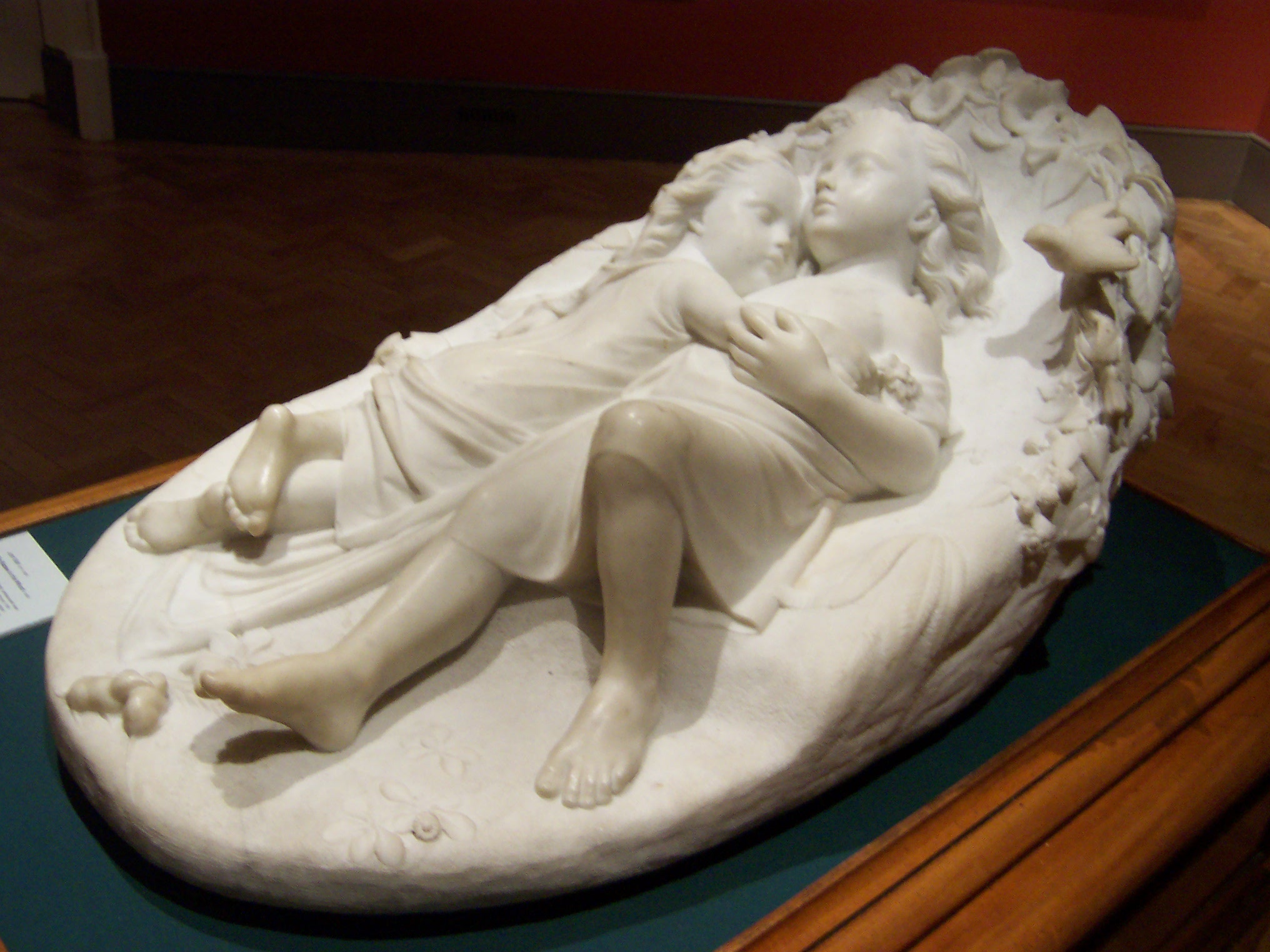
Babes in the Wood by John Bell, ca 1842. Norwich Castle

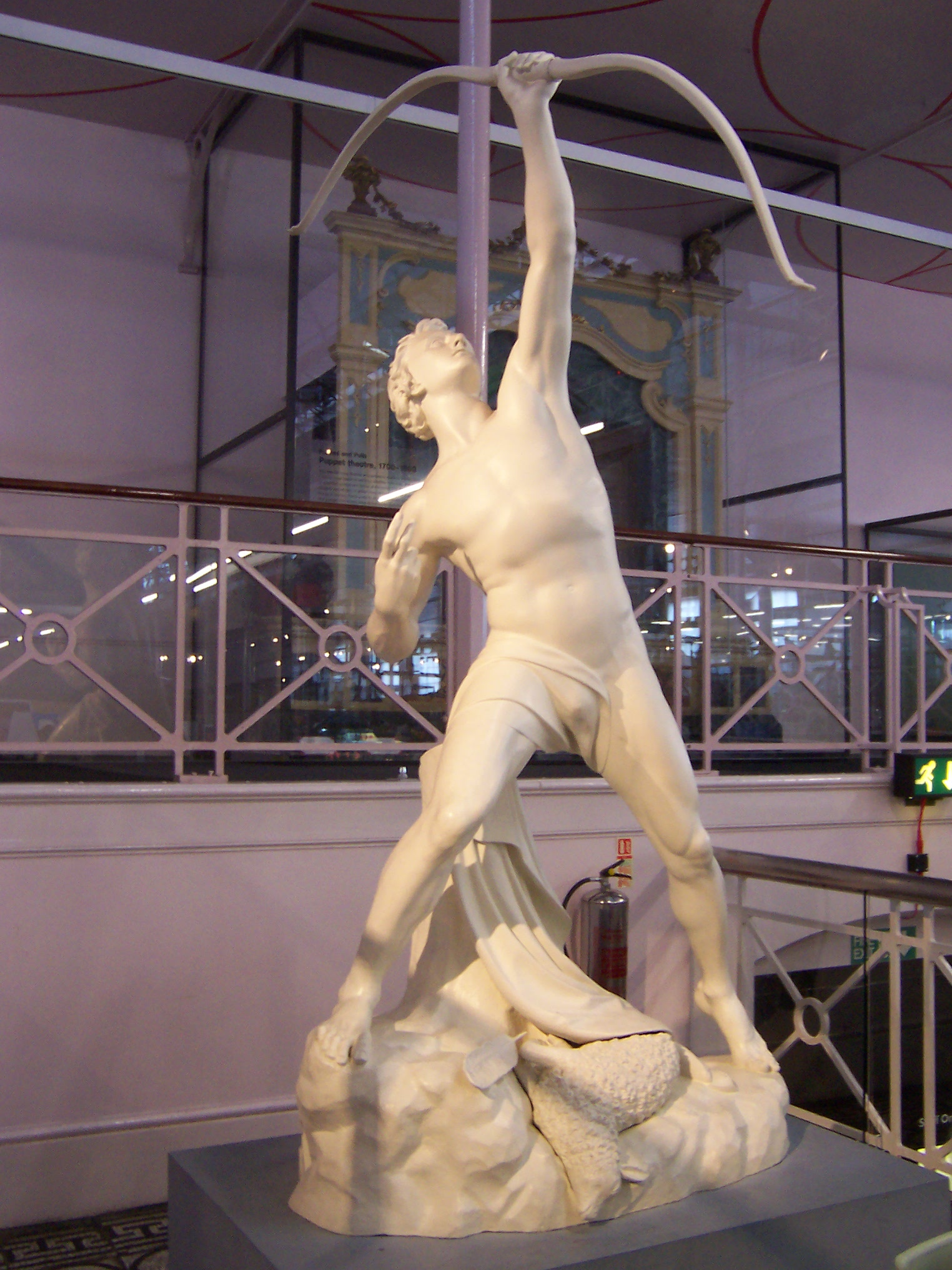
The Eagle Slayer by John Bell. This cast iron version, exhibited at the Great Exhibition of 1851, is now held at the Museum of Childhood, Bethnal Green, London.

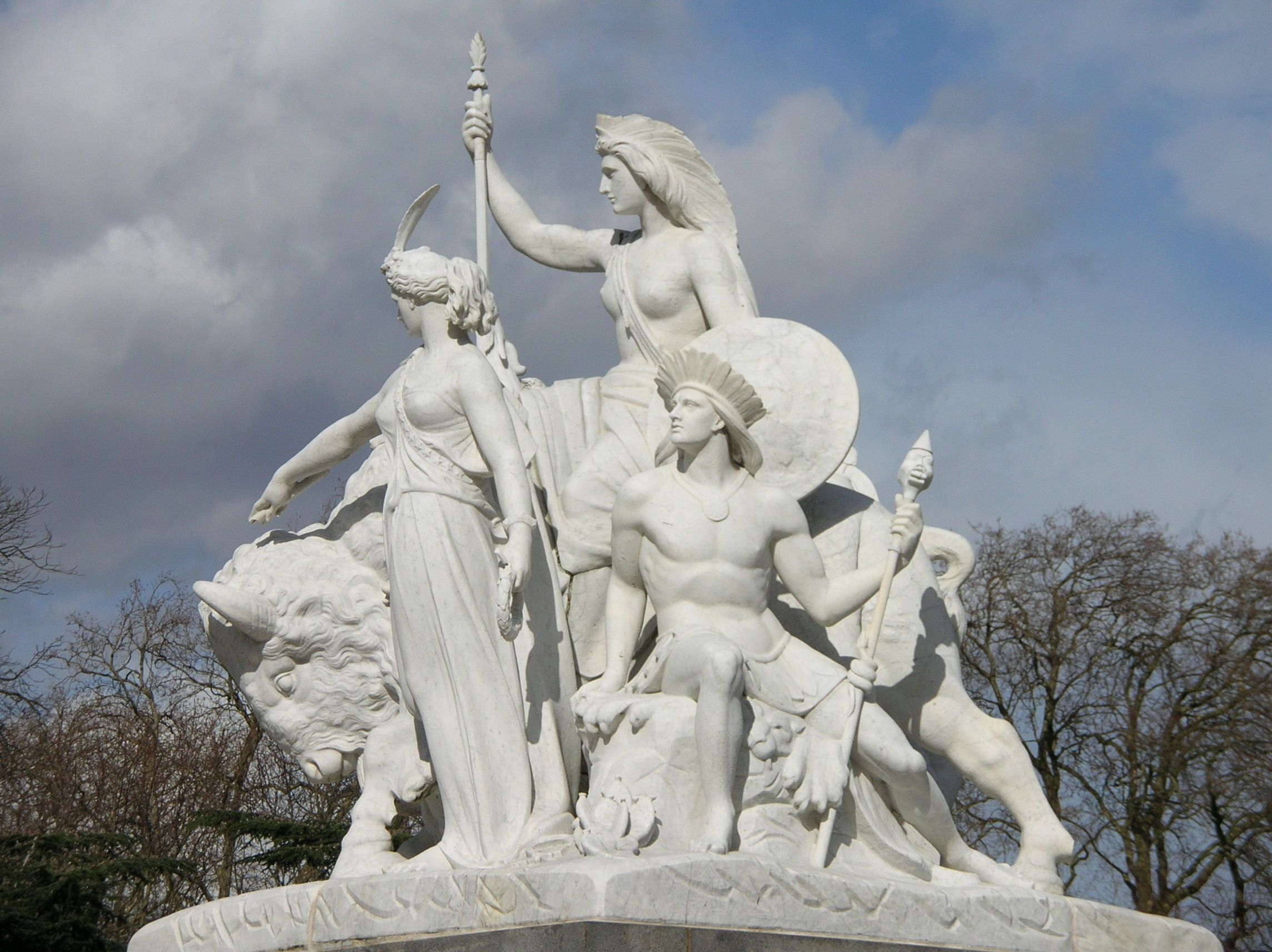
Bell's America on the Albert Memorial

John Bell (1811–1895) was an English sculptor. His family home was Hopton Hall, Suffolk. His works were shown at the Great Exhibition of 1851, and he was responsible for the marble group representing "America" on the Albert Memorial in London.

== Life ==
John Bell was born at Hopton Hall Hopton, Suffolk in 1811, and educated in the village school in Catfield, Norfolk.

He studied sculpture in the Royal Academy Schools from 1829, and exhibited his first work at the academy, a religious group, in 1832. The next year he exhibited A Girl at a Brook and John the Baptist at the academy, and two statuettes at the Suffolk Street Gallery, followed by Ariel in 1834. At the Royal Academy in 1836 he showed Psyche feeding a Swan and Youth, Spring, and Infancy.

In 1837, the year in which Bell established his reputation, his works at the Academy included Psyche and the Dove and a model of The Eagle-Shooter, the first version of what was to become one of his most celebrated statues; he also exhibited two busts, Amoret and Psyche, at the British Institution. His Babes in the Wood was exhibited at the Royal Academy summer exhibition two years later. There are marble versions at Osborne House, and Norwich Castle.

In 1844 Bell entered his Eagle Slayer and Jane Shore in the competition held for sculpture for the new Houses of Parliament. A cast-iron version of the Eagle Slayer - the first statue ever to be made from the material - was produced for The Great Exhibition of 1851, where it stood under a canopy surmounted by the eagle. It was later placed outside the South Kensington Museum, and is now in the V&A Museum of Childhood in Bethnal Green. He also exhibited a sculpture of Shakespeare at the 1851 exhibition, which was widely reproduced, for example on the front page of Recollections of the Great Exhibition.

For Coalbrookdale he created the Deerhound hall table and Andromeda which was bought by Queen Victoria and is now a feature of the gardens at Osborne House.

Una and the Lion, inspired by Edmund Spenser's The Faerie Queene was also exhibited at the Great Exhibition of 1851, and reproduced in miniature in parian ware by Mintons. The full-scale model was placed in the Crystal Palace which burned down in 1936.

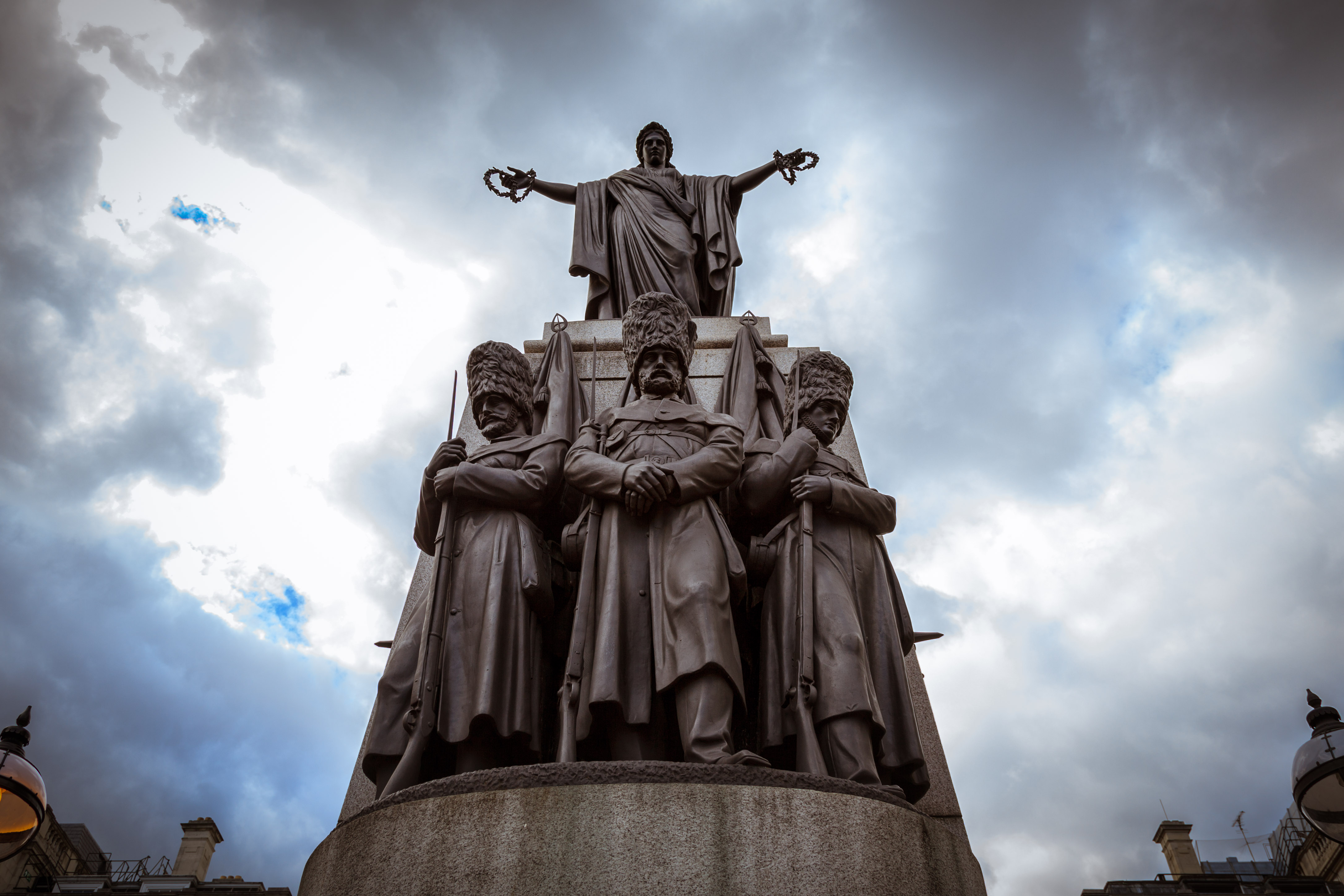
The 1861 Guards Crimean War Memorial in Waterloo Place, London.

His best-known work is the Guards Crimean War Memorial at the junction of Pall Mall and Waterloo Place in London. Unveiled in 1861, it depicts an allegorical figure representing "Honour" standing above three guardsmen, who are resting on reverse arms as though at a funeral. Although the mournful appearance of the figures reflected the public mood over the wasteful Crimean War, critics were dismayed by the lack of the customary heroic poses.

Bell's 1862 sculpture of Oliver Cromwell originally designed for the 1862 International Exhibition was erected in 1899 in Warrington, Lancashire.

In 1864 Bell accepted the commission to create a marble group representing America, as one of the four large sculptures representing the continents, for the corners of the Albert Memorial in Kensington Gardens. He decided to create an allegory of human progress in the Americas, with figures representing Canada and the United States in the lead and two others representing Central and South America at the rear, all grouped around a massive bison. He also proposed, unsuccessfully, a kneeling effigy of Prince Albert as a soldier of Christ for the memorial, following the death in 1867 of Carlo Marochetti, who had been working on the prince's statue.

In 1868, Bell created a female nude from grey-veined marble named The Octoroon, a woman whose one eighth percentage of African blood renders her a slave. According to Mia L. Bagneris it "reflects Victorian Britain’s fascination with the enslaved, American, mixed-race beauty and suggests provocative resonances between the antebellum South and the Orient in the popular imagination." It was purchased in 1876 by the town of Blackburn and can be seen at the Blackburn Museum & Art Gallery.

In 1877, he created a bronze The Manacled Slave/On the Sea Shore.

Bell died on 14 March 1895 at 15 Douro Place, Kensington.

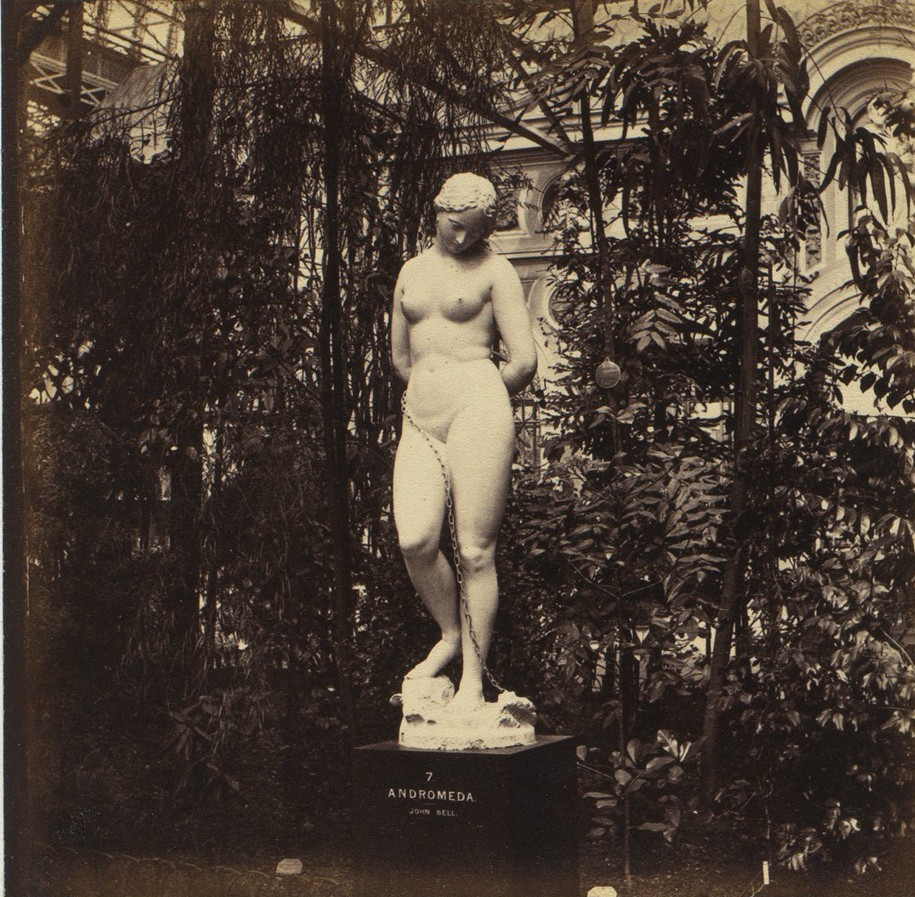
Sculpture of Andromeda in 1859 photo

== Legacy ==
His pupil Francis John Williamson also became a successful sculptor, reputed to have been Queen Victoria's favourite.

His sculpture of Shakespeare at the 1851 exhibition was used by John Leech as the centrepiece of his cartoon Dinner-time at the Crystal Palace, published in Punch.

== Reception ==
In 2022, the curators of The Colour of Anxiety, an exhibition at the Henry Moore Institute in Leeds, which shows two of Bell´s sculptures The Manacled Slave/On the Sea Shore and The Octoroon, have commented that " While white male sculptors such as John Bell and Charles Cordier intended to bring the pathos of the institution of slavery to public attention, yet they nonetheless traded on the allure of illicit sexuality born of that same system."

== Sources ==
- Bayley, Stephen (1983). The Albert Memorial. London: Scholar Press. pp. 87–9. ISBN 9780859675949.
- Danahay, Martin (2022). War without Bodies: Framing Death from the Crimean to the Iraq War. New Brunswick, NJ: Rutgers University Press. ISBN 978-1978819207.

Attribution

This article incorporates text from a publication now in the public domain: Dodgson, Campbell (1901). "Bell, John (1811-1895)". In Lee, Sidney (ed.). Dictionary of National Biography (1st supplement). London: Smith, Elder & Co.
