= François Sallé =

French painter (1839–1930)

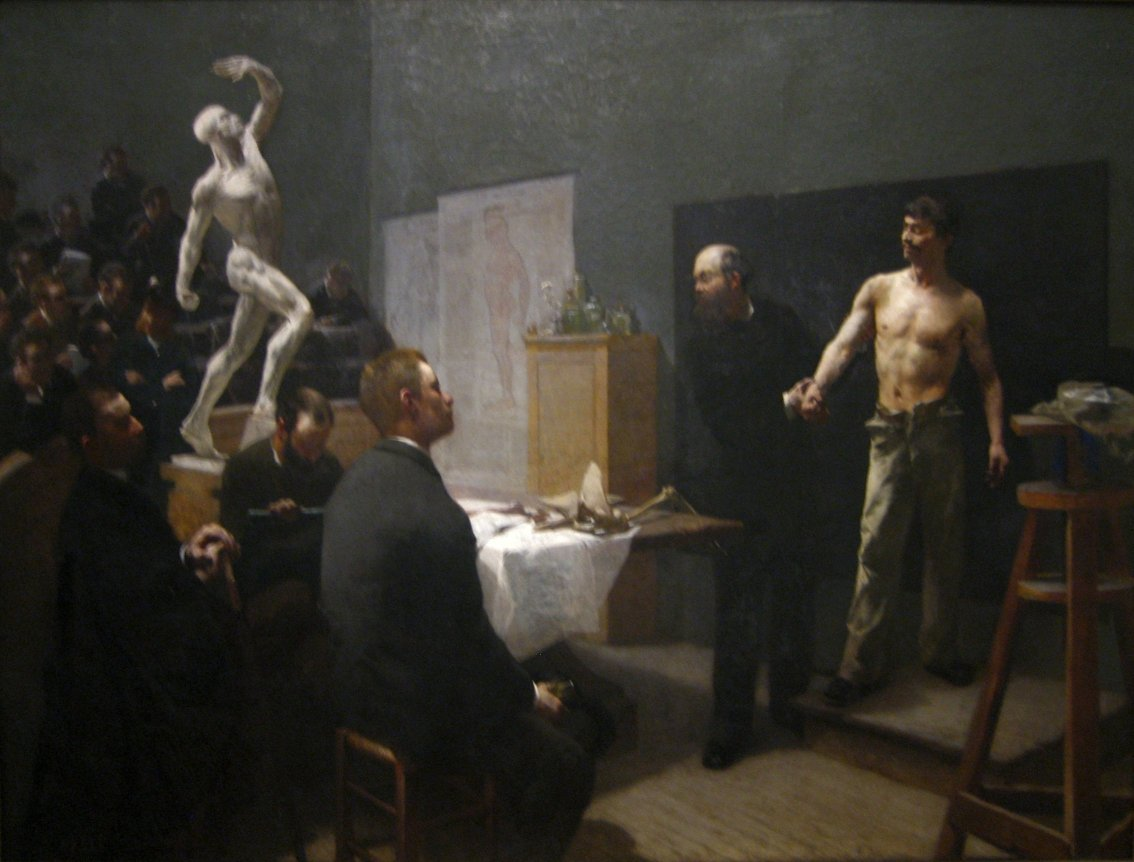
The Anatomy Class at the École des Beaux Arts, oil on canvas painting by François Sallé, 1888, Art Gallery of New South Wales

François Antoine Sallé (French pronunciation: [fʁɑ̃swa sale]; 1839–1930) was a French realist painter. He is best known for his 1888 painting The Anatomy Class at the École des Beaux-Arts.
