= Battle of Vigo Bay (painting) =

1702 painting by Ludolf Bakhuizen

The Battle of Vigo Bay
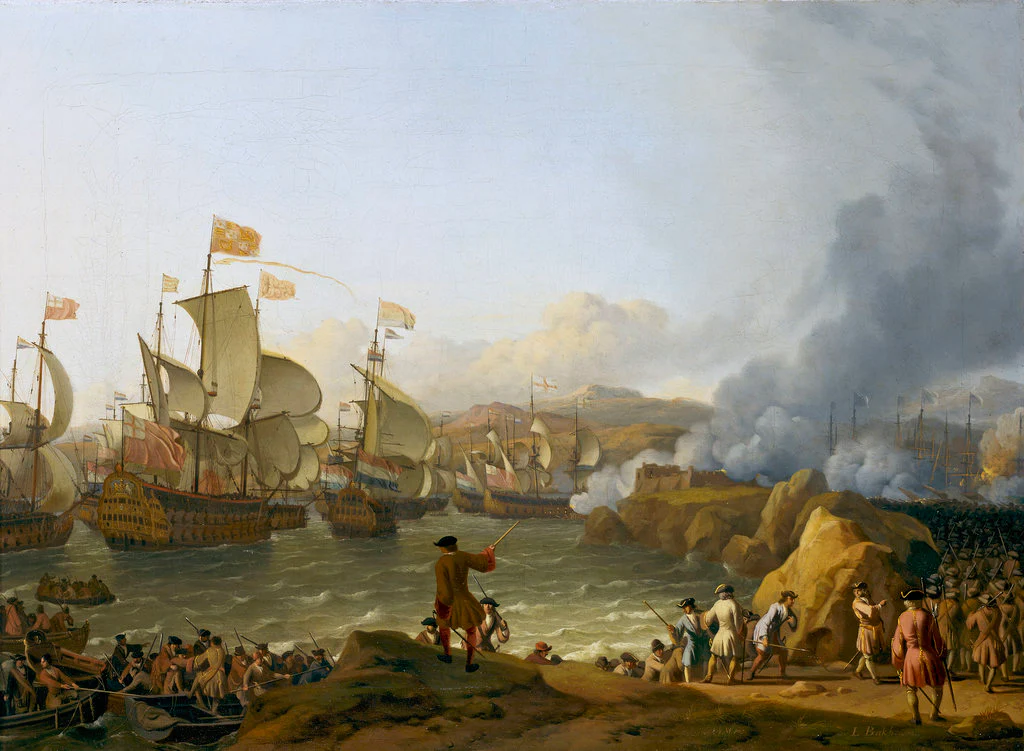
- Artist: Ludolf Bakhuizen
- Year: c. 1702
- Medium: Oil on canvas
- Dimensions: 48.3 cm × 68.6 cm (19.0 in × 27.0 in)
- Location: National Maritime Museum, London

The Battle of Vigo Bay is a 1702 oil on canvas painting by the Dutch artist Ludolf Bakhuizen. It depicts the Battle of Vigo Bay fought by Anglo-Dutch and Franco-Spanish forces.
