= Johann Wolfgang Baumgartner =

German painter

- Style: Rococo

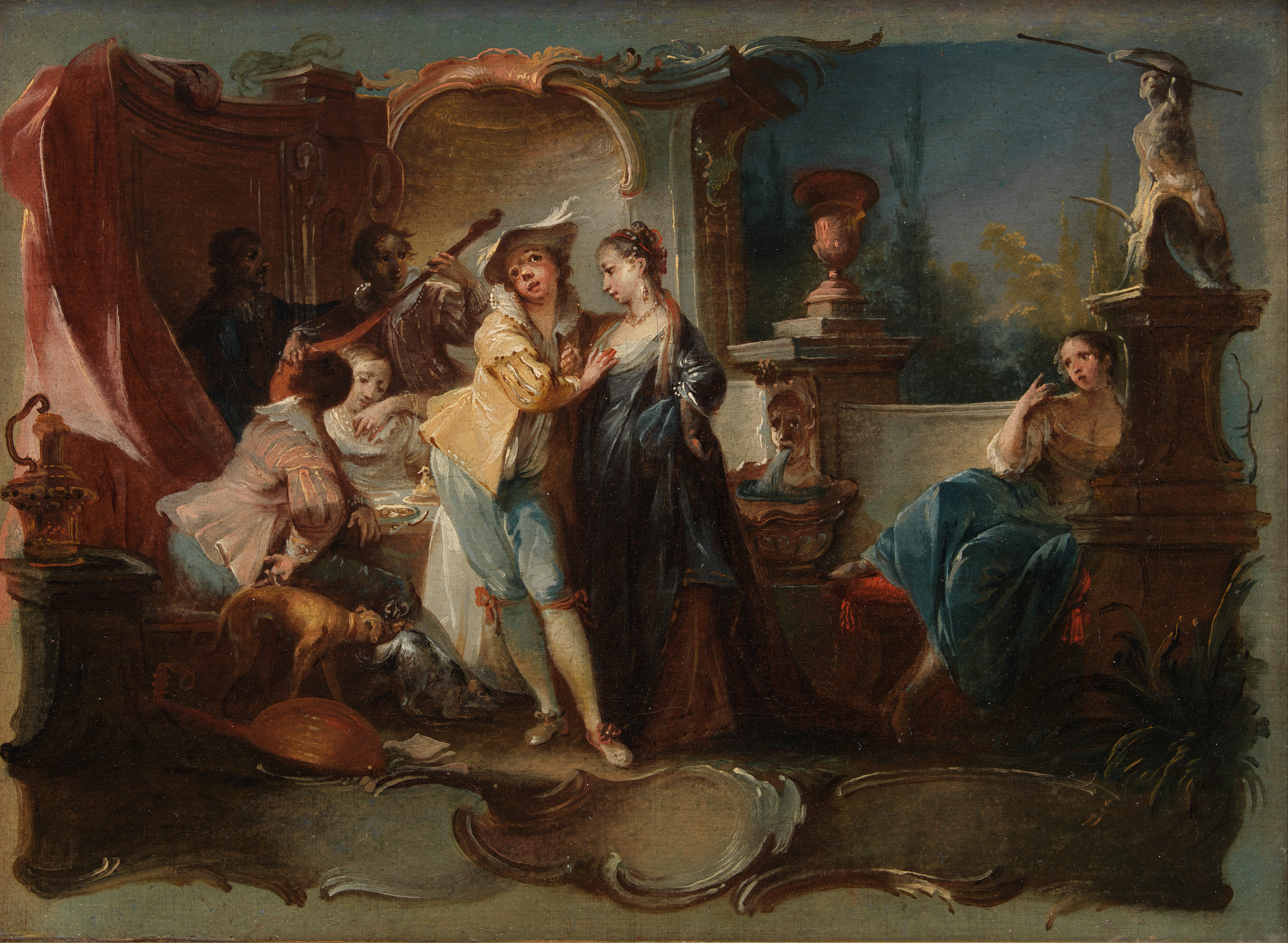
The Prodigal Son Living with Harlots by Johann Wolfgang Baumgartner

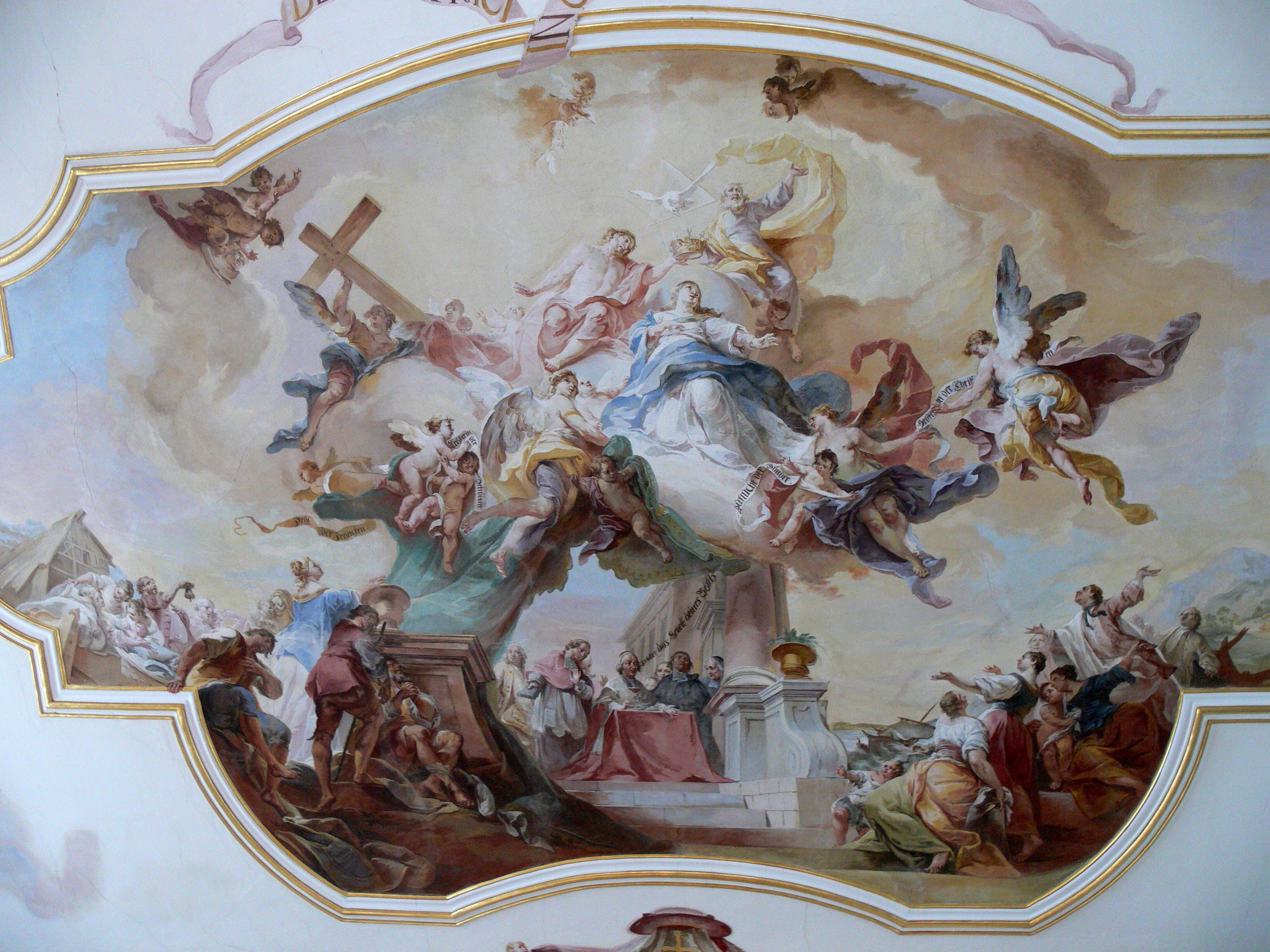
The Assumption and Crowning of Mary, painted ceiling in the transept of Baitenhausen church, 1760

Johann Wolfgang Baumgartner (1702 in Ebbs, Tirol - 7 September 1761 in Augsburg) was an Austrian-German Rococo painter.

== Life ==
He was born Johann Wolfgang Baumgartner in Tyrol and he learned glass painting in Salzburg. He moved to Augsburg and worked as a glass painter. The ceiling painting in the Sanctuary of the Holy Cross of the former Klosters Mountains is considered as his largest and most important work.

== Works ==
- Ceiling frescoes of the Sanctuary of St. Mary of Mount Carmel in Baitenhausen in Meersburg on Lake Constance, 1760
- Ceiling frescoes in the nave of the Sanctuary of St. Maria Loreto in Westheim
- The Martyrdom of St. Venantius of Camerino
- Daily edification of a true Christian
- Mark the Evangelist writing
- The Holy. John I. and the Gothic King Theodoric
- Drawings of Bible pictures in Historia veteris (ac novi) Testamenti Iconibus Expressa
