= Paul Beck Goddard =

American physician and photographer of the 19th century

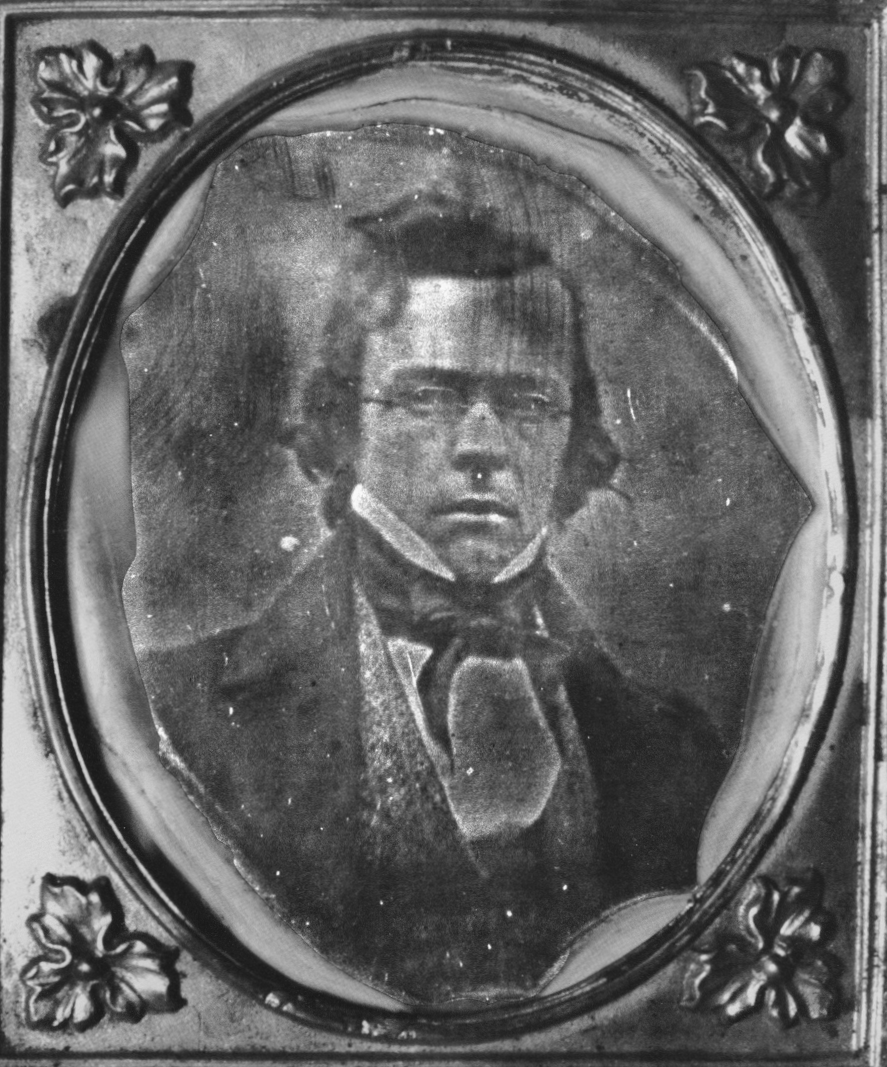
- Goddard in a December 1839 daguerreotype by Robert Cornelius
- Born: c. 1811; Unknown
- Died: July 5, 1866 (aged 54–55); Philadelphia, Pennsylvania, U.S.
- Occupation: physician

Paul Beck Goddard (c. 1811 - July 5, 1866) was an American medical doctor and editor of medical books who also made pioneering contributions to photography.

He graduated from the medical school of the University of Pennsylvania in 1832. As well as practicing as a physician and surgeon, he was professor of anatomy at Franklin Medical College of Philadelphia, and a member of the American Philosophical Society (elected in 1840).

In his experimental photography work with Robert Cornelius, in 1839 Goddard became the first to use bromide for daguerreotypes. Goddard was then working as an assistant to University of Pennsylvania Chemistry professor Dr. Robert Hare, and this chemistry background contributed to his successful experiments with bromine. Recognizing the potential of this innovation, which significantly decreased exposure times, Goddard helped Cornelius set up a commercial photography studio.

Goddard died in Philadelphia on July 5, 1866. Reporting his death, The New York Times described him "one of the most eminent physicians of this country" and said, "His devotion to wounded soldiers during the war gained him great popularity among the people."
