= The Earthstopper =

Painting by Joseph Wright of Derby

Earthstoppers
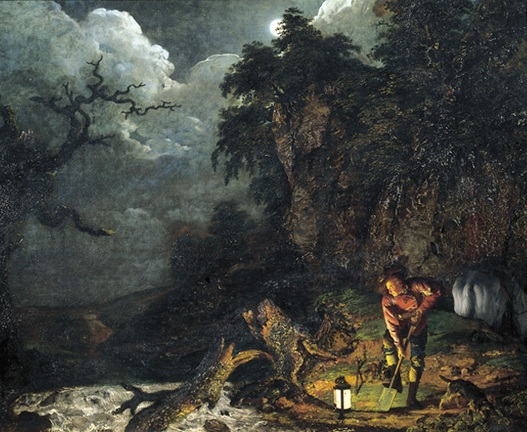
- Artist: Joseph Wright of Derby
- Year: 1773
- Dimensions: 97 cm × 121 cm (38 in × 48 in)
- Location: Derby Museum and Art Gallery, Derby

Earthstopper on the Banks of the Derwent is a painting by Joseph Wright of Derby originally completed in 1773. The scene shows a man digging at nighttime beside the River Derwent in Derbyshire.

== Description ==
The painting shows a man blocking foxholes so that a subsequent foxhunt could kill the fox without the animal having the opportunity to hide underground. This man was known as an Earthstopper.

Joseph Wright was known for his studies under unusual lighting and this can be seen here combined with landscape. Wright completed few notable paintings that included landscapes before he went on his tour of Italy where he created a large number including those that showed the eruption of Vesuvias. Benedict Nicolson, who was an authority on Joseph Wright believed this painting inspired lines of poetry in a collection named after and in aid of the preservation of Needwood Forest. The lines were written by Francis Noel Clarke Mundy, who later commissioned six Wright portraits, including one of himself. These three quarter length portraits were of himself and five of his friends in the uniform of Mundy's own private hunt. Mundy's lines read:

Whilst as the silver moonbeams rise,
Imagin'd temples strike my eyes
With tottering spire, and mouldering wall,
And high roof nodding to it's fall, -
His lanterns gleaming down the glade,
One, like a sexton with his spade,
Comes from their caverns to exclude
The midnight prowlers from the wood...

It is apt that Wright who had based his own paintings like Miravan on literature should, in turn, inspire poetry in the group that included Erasmus Darwin and Anna Seward.

== History ==
The painting was exhibited in 1773. It was bought by Philip Yorke who became a fellow of the Royal Society and was the 2nd Earl of Hardwicke. The painting remained in the Earl's family until it was sold by the fifth Earl who was nicknamed "Champagne Charlie". The painting was eventually bought by Benedict Nicolson (Wright's biographer) who sold it via the National Art Collections Fund into the collection of Derby Museum and Art Gallery.

The painting is directly referenced in the play Underneath the Lintel by Glen Berger.
