= Naitō Toyomasa =

Japanese sculptor

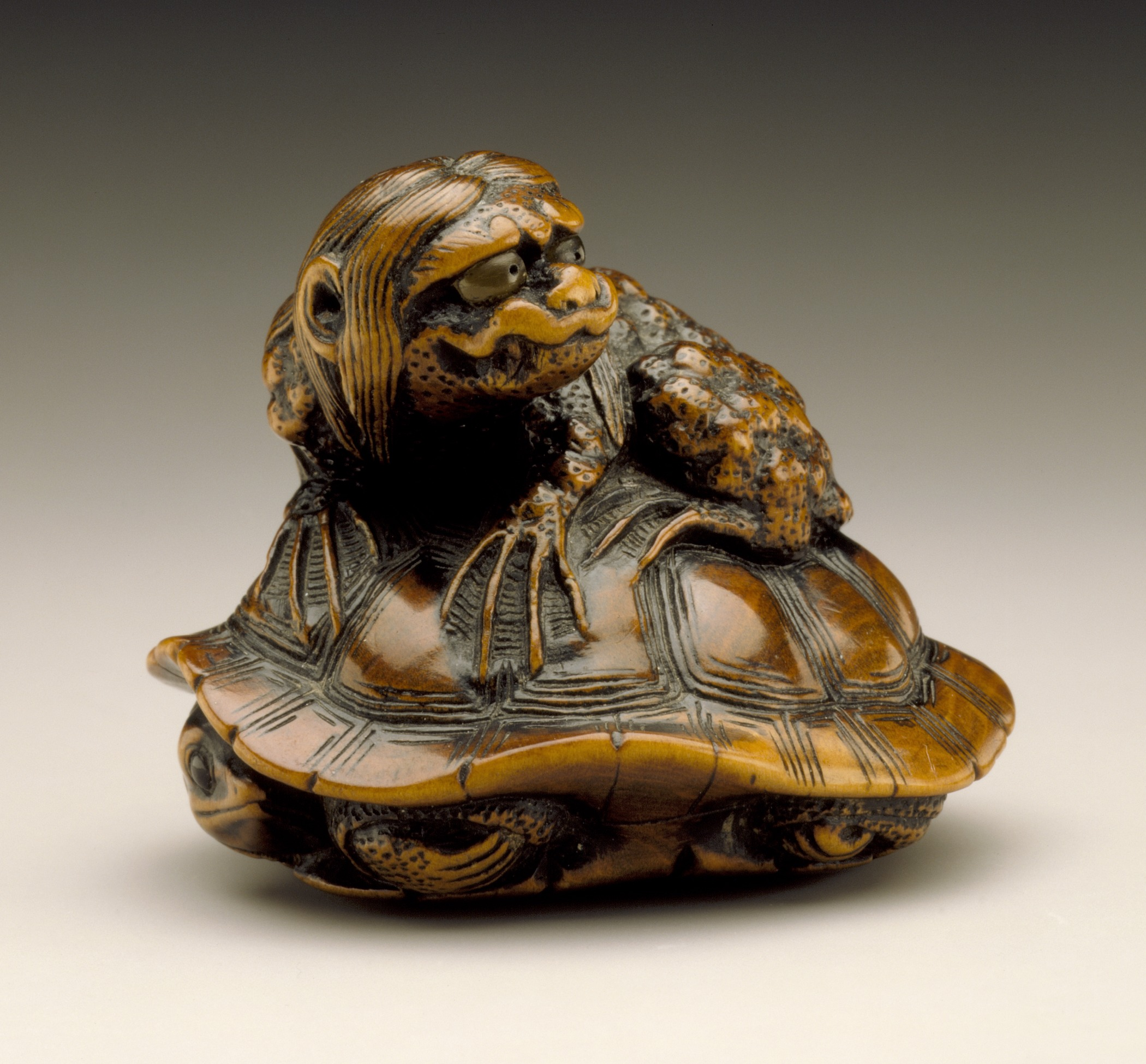
Kappa astride on turtle netsuke out of wood, first half of 19th century, by Naitō Toyomasa

Naitō Toyomasa (内藤 豊昌; October 3, 1773 – October 25, 1856) was a Japanese sculptor of netsuke from Tanba Province. He was thus associated with the Tamba school. His works often depict animals.

The Los Angeles County Museum of Art (LACMA) has an extensive collection of his works.

== Bibliography ==
- Naito Toyomasa, Parts I & II by Kazutoyo Ichimichi
