= Una and the Lion =

British 5 pound gold coin

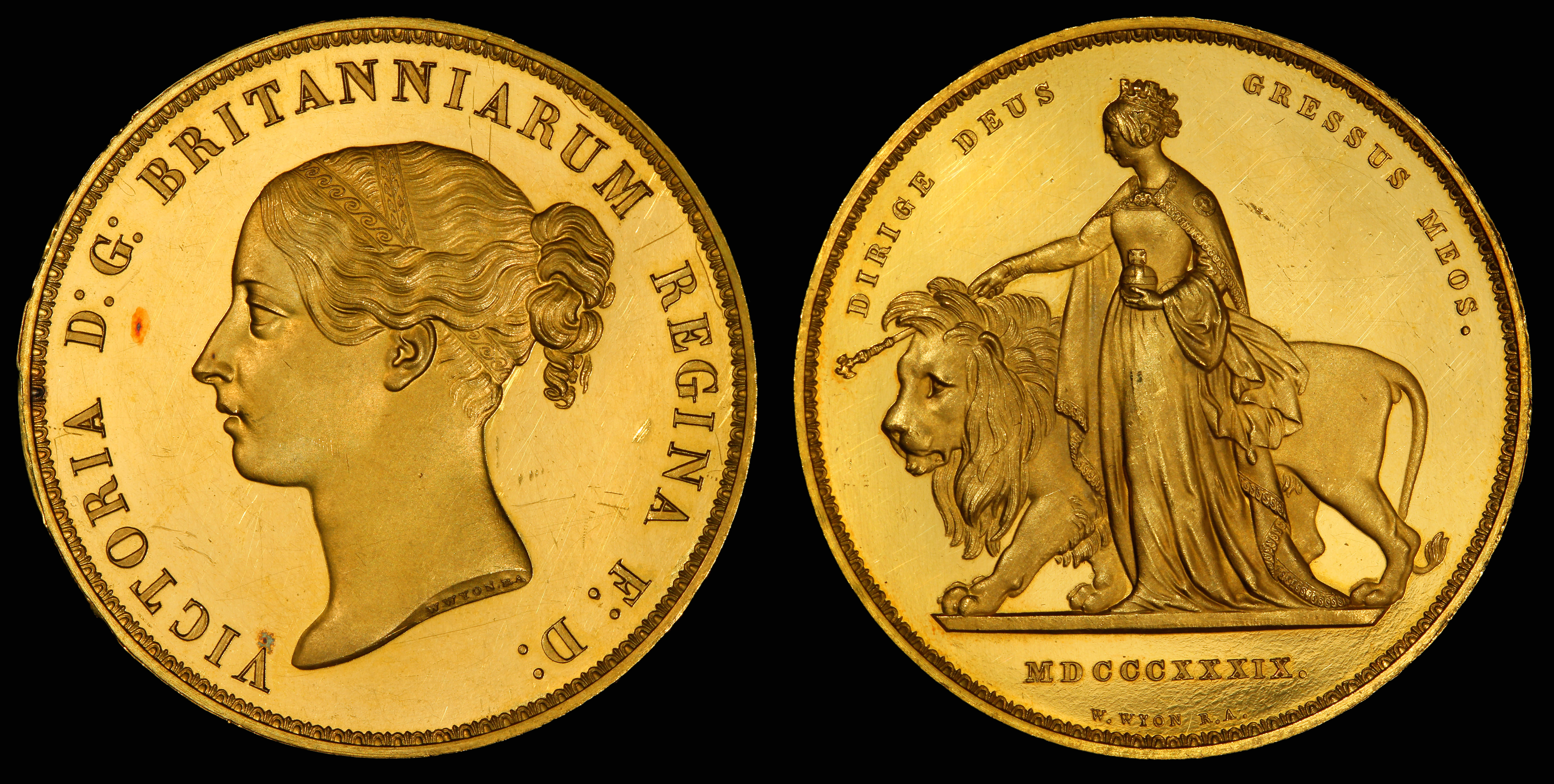
United Kingdom 1839 5 Pounds, photo by Wioletta Madaj

The Una and the Lion is a British £5 gold coin depicting Queen Victoria. It is characterized by the Royal Mint Museum as "one of the most beautiful coins in the world." Designed by William Wyon in 1839, it commemorates the beginning of Queen Victoria's reign (in 1837). The coins were first produced in 1839 and were intended for collector sets rather than for circulation. The production ran to a few hundred coins including a number of variations such as different metals, different hairbands on the depiction of the queen, different edge types, and a variation in the reverse inscription.

The coin is the lightest of the British £5 coins, weighing only 38.7–39.3 grams (about 1 1/4 troy ounce).

== Obverse ==
The obverse of the coin shows Victoria's head, and the Latin phrase "VICTORIA D: G: BRITANNIARUM REGINA F: D:" – "Victoria by the Grace of God, Queen of the British Territories, Defender of the Faith" - is inscribed around the head.

== Reverse ==
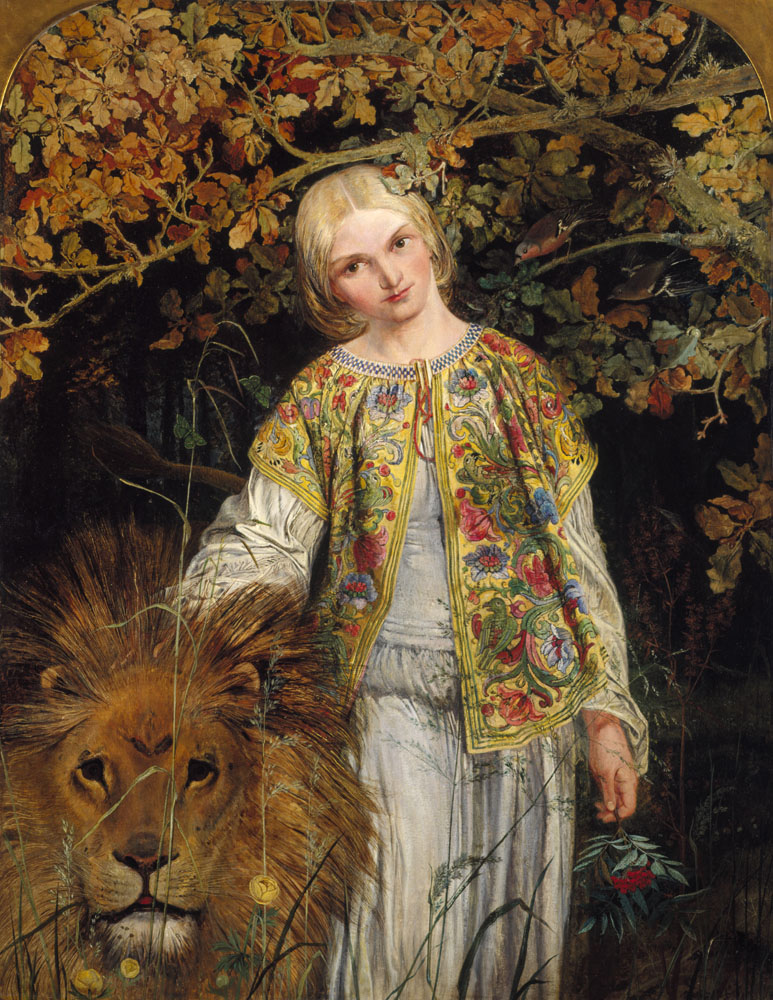
Una and the Lion by William Bell Scott (National Galleries of Scotland)

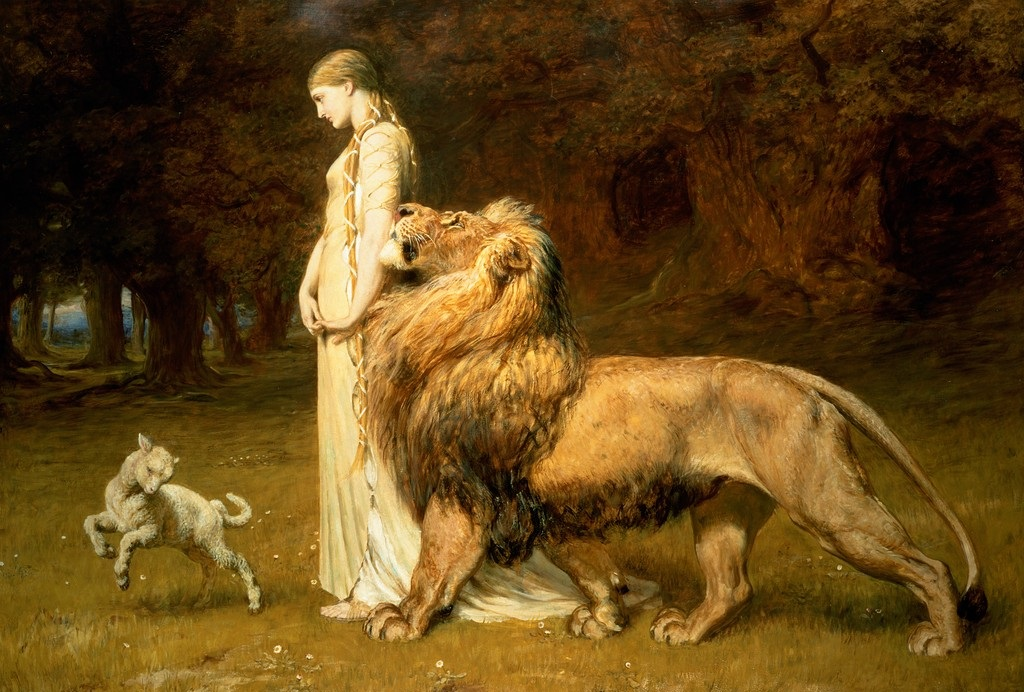
Una and the Lion by Briton Rivière

The reverse of the coin is a depiction of Queen Victoria walking to the left of a lion. There is also a Latin phrase, DIRIGE DEUS GRESSUS MEOS. – "May God direct my steps". There is also a variant of the inscription with DIRIGIT instead of DIRIGE. Underneath the lion are the Roman numerals MDCCCXXXIX (1839).

The same Latin inscription appears on the 2012 Royal Mint £5 Crown, minted to commemorate the Diamond Jubilee of Queen Elizabeth II.

The reverse design, with a Roman numeral date of MM and then "2000 AD." below instead of Wyon's signature, was used for a silver one ounce coin of the Milestones of the Millennium series.

The depiction of the young Queen as Lady Una (a character from Edmund Spenser's poem The Faerie Queene, from 1590) was seen at the time as a bold design decision as it was the first occasion when a British monarch had been depicted on a coin as a fictional character. Queen Victoria, as Una, is depicted holding a sceptre while the lion, Lady Una's guardian, represents England.
