= Robert Cornelius =

American photography pioneer (1809–1893)

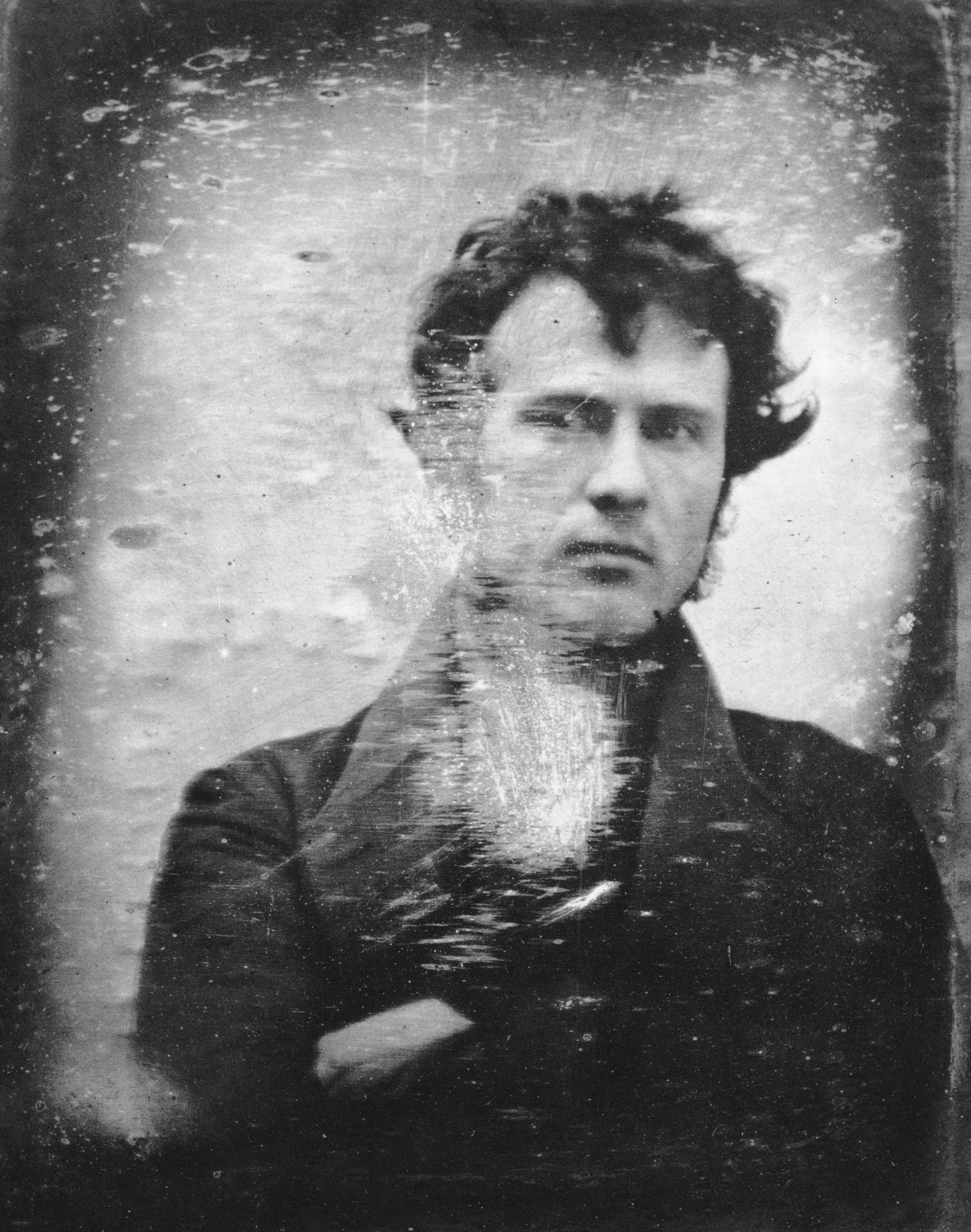
- Cornelius' 1839 self-portrait
- Born: March 1, 1809; Philadelphia, Pennsylvania, U.S.
- Died: August 10, 1893 (aged 84); Philadelphia, Pennsylvania, U.S.
- Resting place: Laurel Hill Cemetery, Philadelphia, Pennsylvania, U.S.
- Occupations: Photographer; businessman; manufacturer
- Spouse: Harriet Comly (m. 1832; died 1884)
- Children: 8

Robert Cornelius (/kɔːrˈniːliəs/; March 1, 1809 – August 10, 1893) was an American photographer and pioneer in the history of photography. His daguerreotype self-portrait taken in 1839 is generally accepted as the first known photographic portrait of a person taken in the United States, the second in the world, and a significant achievement for self-portraiture. He operated some of the earliest photography studios in the United States between 1840 and 1842 and implemented innovative techniques to significantly reduce the exposure time required for portraits.

Cornelius was an inventor, businessman and lamp manufacturer. He created and patented the "solar lamp" in 1843 which burned brighter and allowed for the use of cheaper lard as a fuel source rather than more expensive whale oil.

== Life and career ==
Cornelius was born in Philadelphia to Sarah Cornelius (née Soder) and Christian Cornelius. His father emigrated from Amsterdam in 1783 and worked as a silversmith before opening a lamp-manufacturing company. He attended private school as a youth and took a particular interest in chemistry. In 1831, he began working for his father and specialized in silver plating and metal polishing.

=== Photography ===
In late September 1839, soon after the daguerreotype was publicized, Joseph Saxton took a picture of the Philadelphia Central High School, which is considered one of the oldest photographs taken in the United States. Soon after, Saxton approached Cornelius in order to receive better daguerreotype plates. It was this meeting that sparked Cornelius's interest in photography. Around October 1839, Cornelius improvised a camera obscura and made his first daguerreotype, a self-portrait outside of his family store. The image required him to pose still for 10 to 15 minutes and has survived. Other early images of his family made by Cornelius have not been preserved.

While Louis Daguerre's photograph of the Boulevard du Temple, taken one or two years earlier, incidentally included two people on the sidewalk, Cornelius' self-portrait is generally accepted as the oldest known intentional photographic portrait of a person made in the United States. However, there are a number of earlier claims for photographic portraits, both from Europe and the United States, dating as far back as 1837.

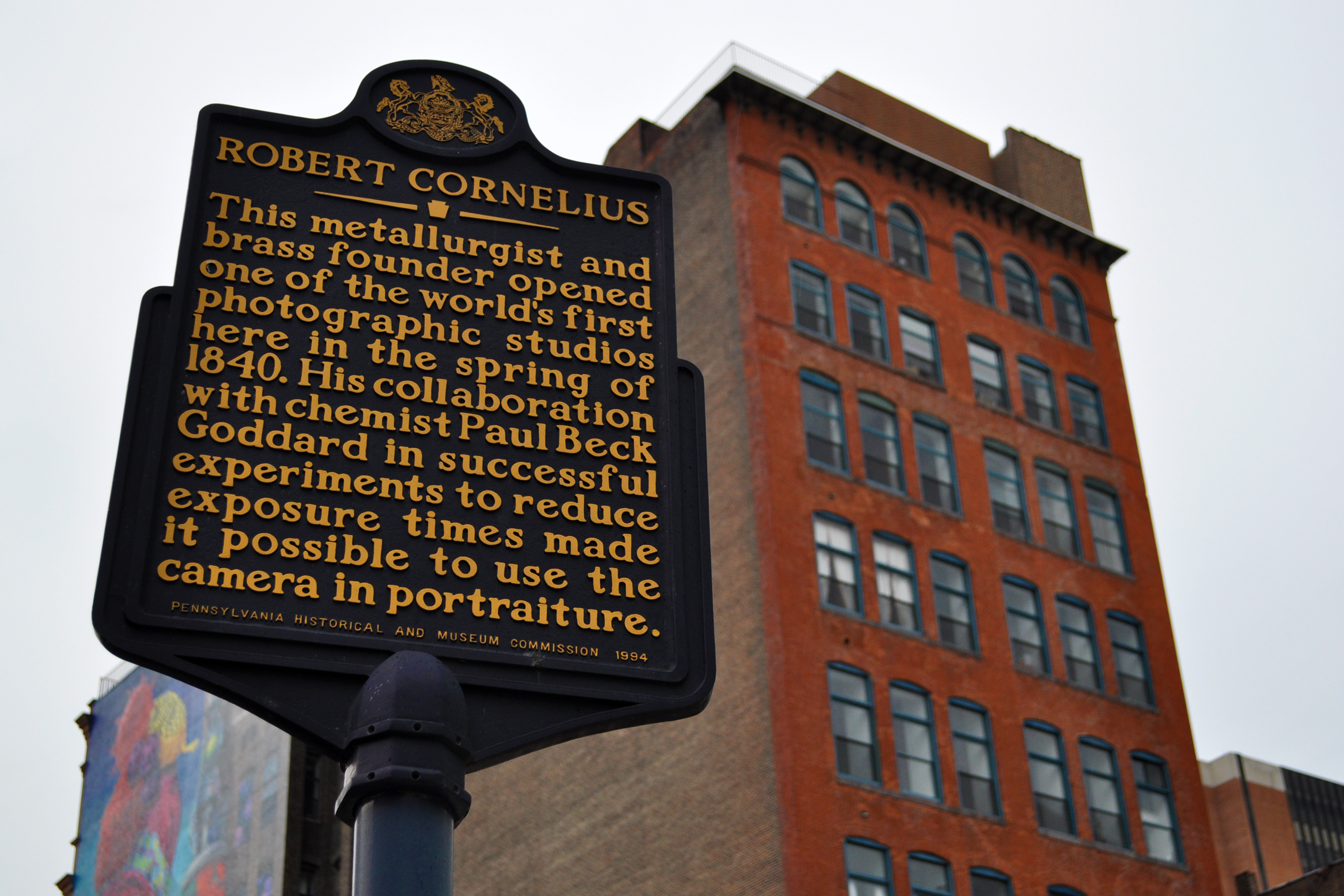
Robert Cornelius Historical Marker in Philadelphia

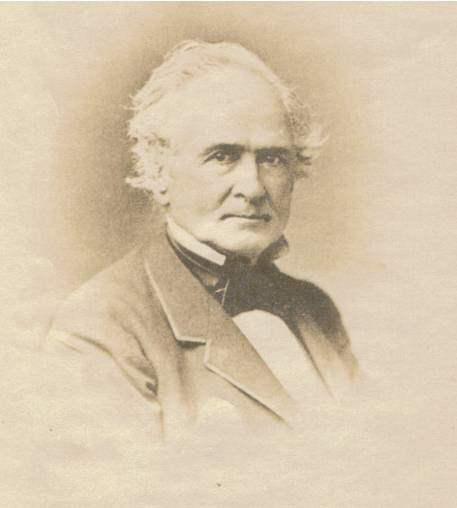
Cornelius photographed in June 1876 by F. Gutekunst

At the time, Cornelius did not make much of his achievement of the first human photograph in the United States. It survived due to the efforts of Marcus Aurelius Root, a pupil at Cornelius' studio. Root published The Camera and The Pencil which provided background on the roots of photography in the United States. The book was highlighted at the Centennial Exhibition in Philadelphia in 1876 and caught the attention of Julius Sachse, a noted Philadelphia photographer and future editor of American Journal of Photography. Sachse began interviewing Cornelius and other members of the American Philosophical Society in order to record the history of photography in the United States. Cornelius told Sachse that he began taking photographs in October 1839 but no evidence was found of his claim until 1975 when a librarian at the American Philosophical Society discovered photographs taken by Cornelius dated 1839.

Working alongside chemist Paul Beck Goddard, Cornelius made significant advancements in reducing exposure times for daguerreotypes. Through the use of bromine, better plates and the implementation of reflectors and blue glass filters to enhance lighting conditions, they managed to decrease the exposure time for daguerreotype portraits to less than a minute.

In May 1840, Cornelius opened a photographic studio, the first in Philadelphia and second in the world. It was preceded by the studio of Alexander Wolcott and John Johnson in New York, which Cornelius visited in the early spring of 1840.

Cornelius's studio gained popularity among wealthy patrons, and many of his portraits of famous individuals still exist today. Cornelius operated a second studio from 1841 to 1842. As the popularity of photography grew and more photographers opened studios, Cornelius either lost interest or realized that he could make more money at the family gas and lighting company.

=== Later work ===
He managed Cornelius & Co. (later known as Cornelius & Baker) and had great success with his invention of the "solar lamp". At the time, whale-oil was used in lamps but had become very expensive. Cornelius revised a British lamp design which forced additional air into the burner and allowed for the burning of lard rather than whale oil. He applied for and received a U.S. patent for the "solar lamp" in 1843. The lamp proved extremely popular and was sold in the U.S. and Europe. Two large factories in Philadelphia manufactured the lamp. Cornelius also received patents for lighting gaslights with electric sparks. The Cornelius lamp company also created the first kerosene lamp, however cheaper and more efficient versions dominated the market. While Cornelius was still a wealthy man, his once dominant lamp company was overtaken by other companies.

== Personal life ==
Cornelius married Harriet Comly (sometimes spelled "Comely") in 1832. They had eight children: three sons and five daughters.

Cornelius retired from his family's business in 1877. In his later years, he lived at his country home in Frankford, Philadelphia. Cornelius was also an elder at the Presbyterian Church, where he was a member for fifty years.

He died at his Frankford home on August 10, 1893 and was interred at Laurel Hill Cemetery.

== Daguerreotypes by Cornelius ==
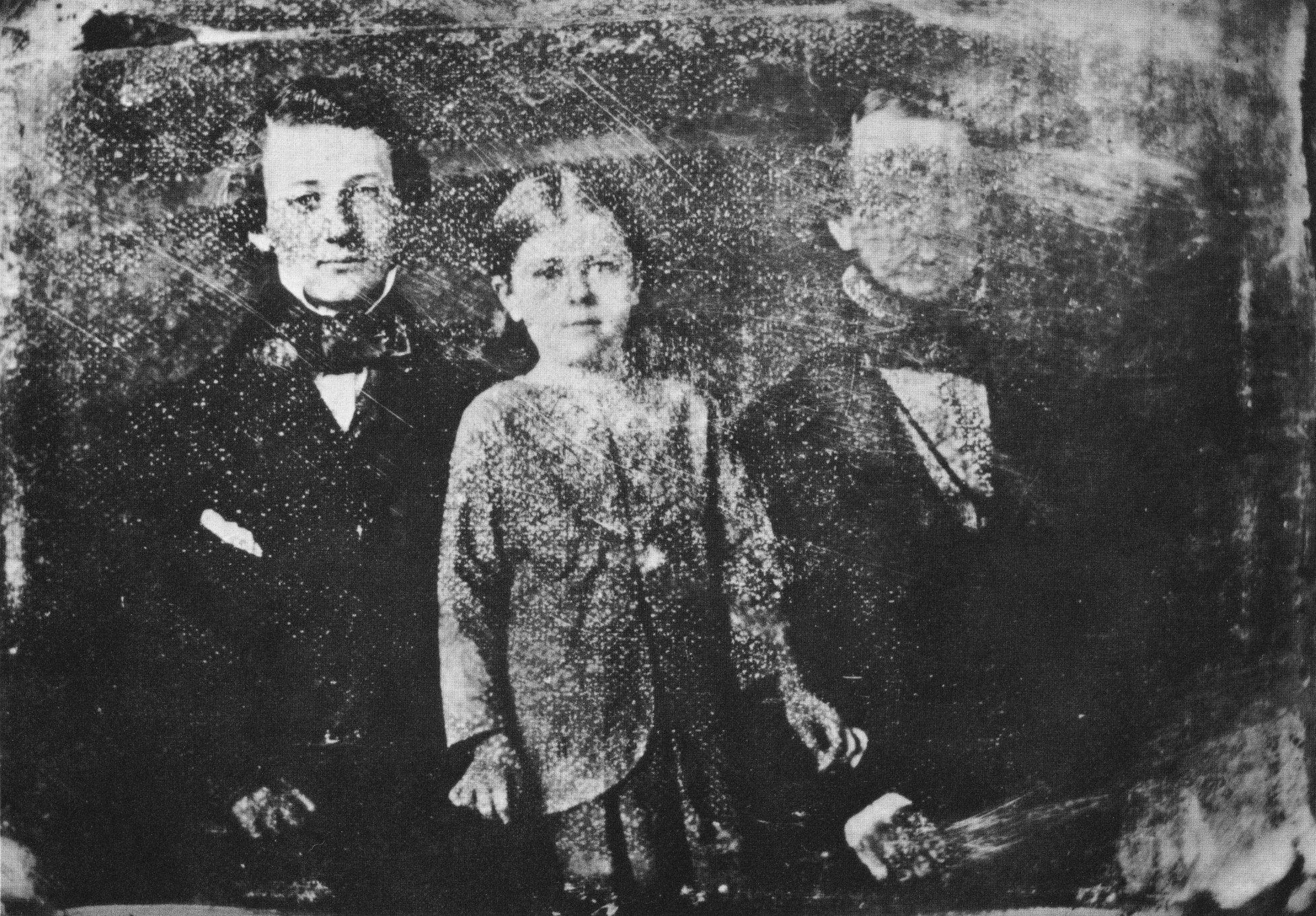
Group portrait by Cornelius, 1839

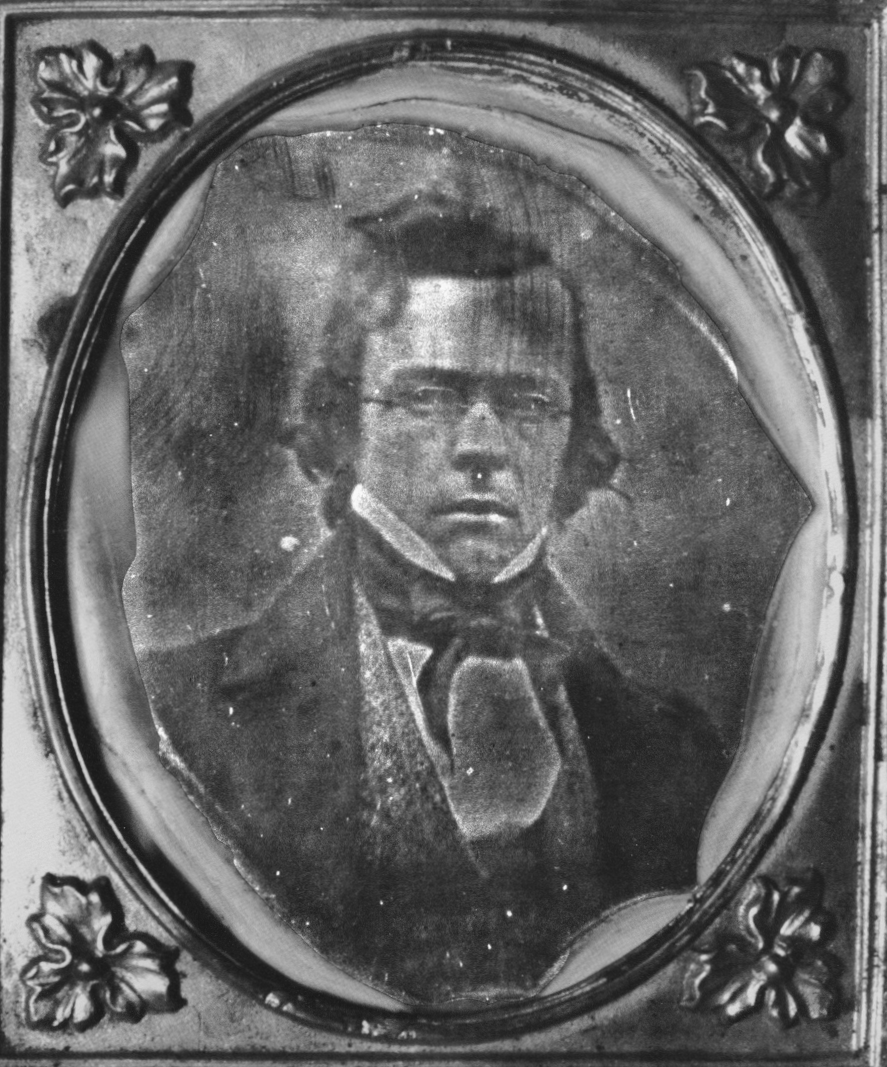
Paul Beck Goddard, Cornelius' assistant, December 1839

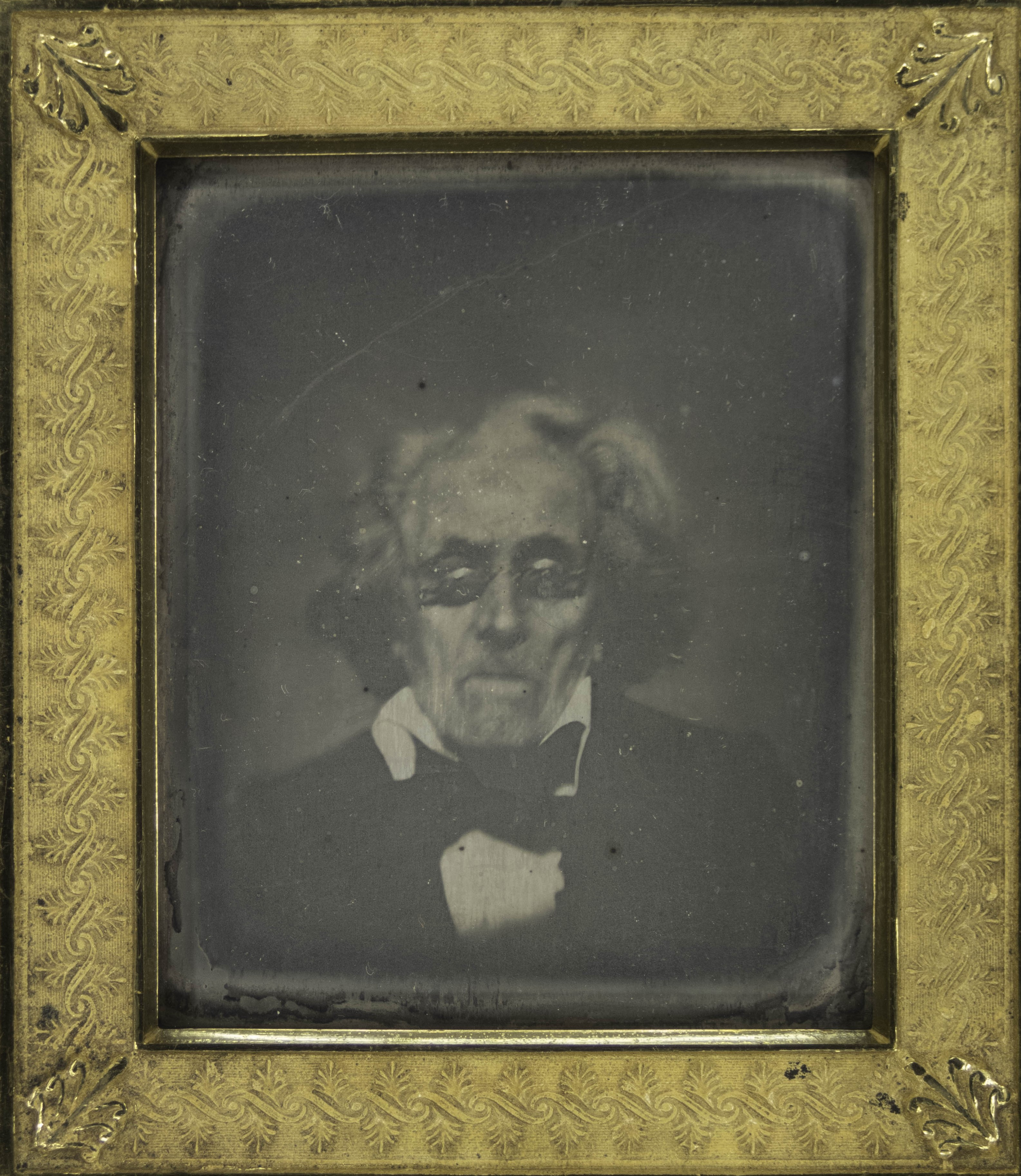
Peter Stephen Du Ponceau, March 1840 (or earlier)

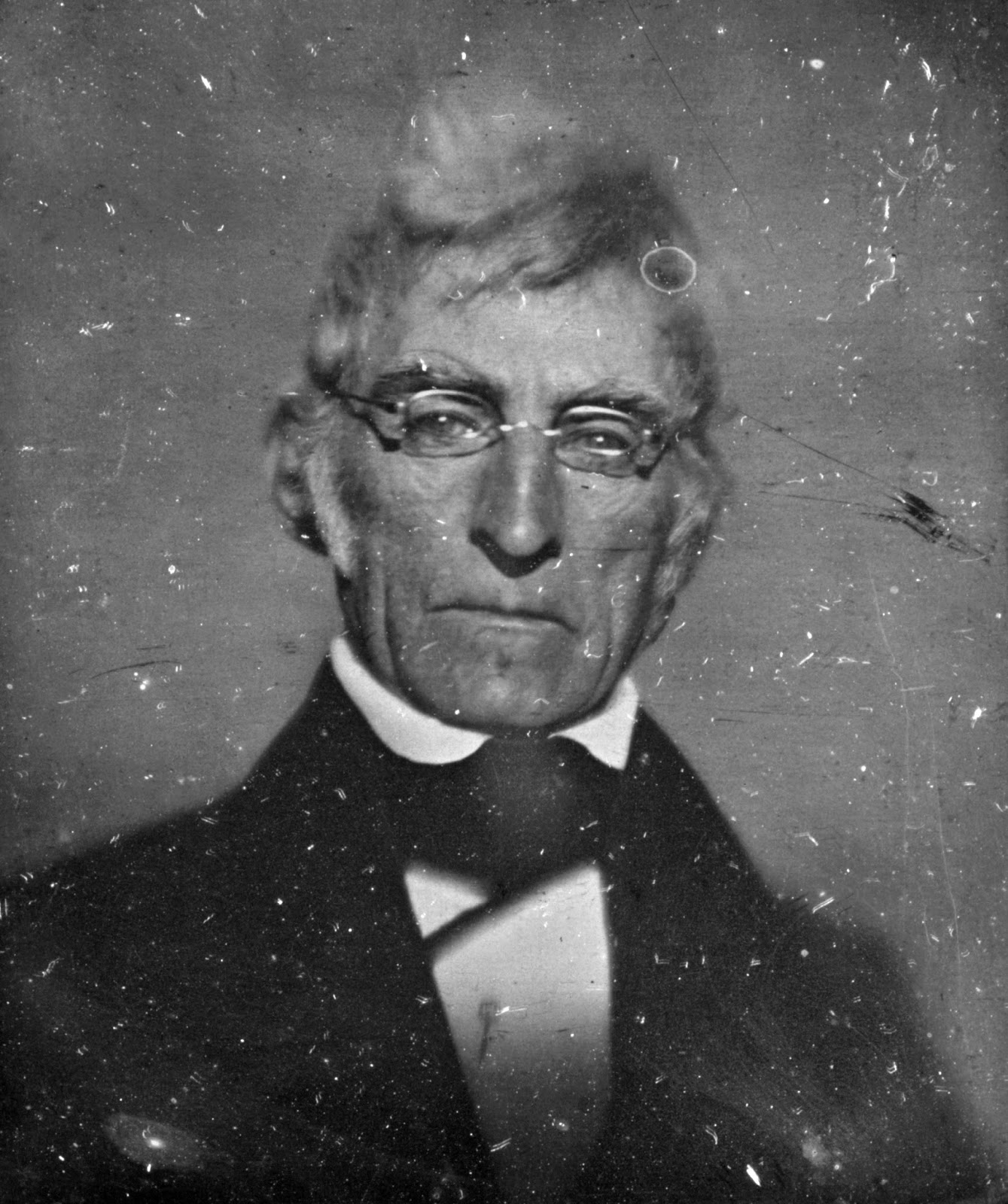
John McAllister Jr. on May 6, 1840. The first commercial studio portrait taken by Robert Cornelius.

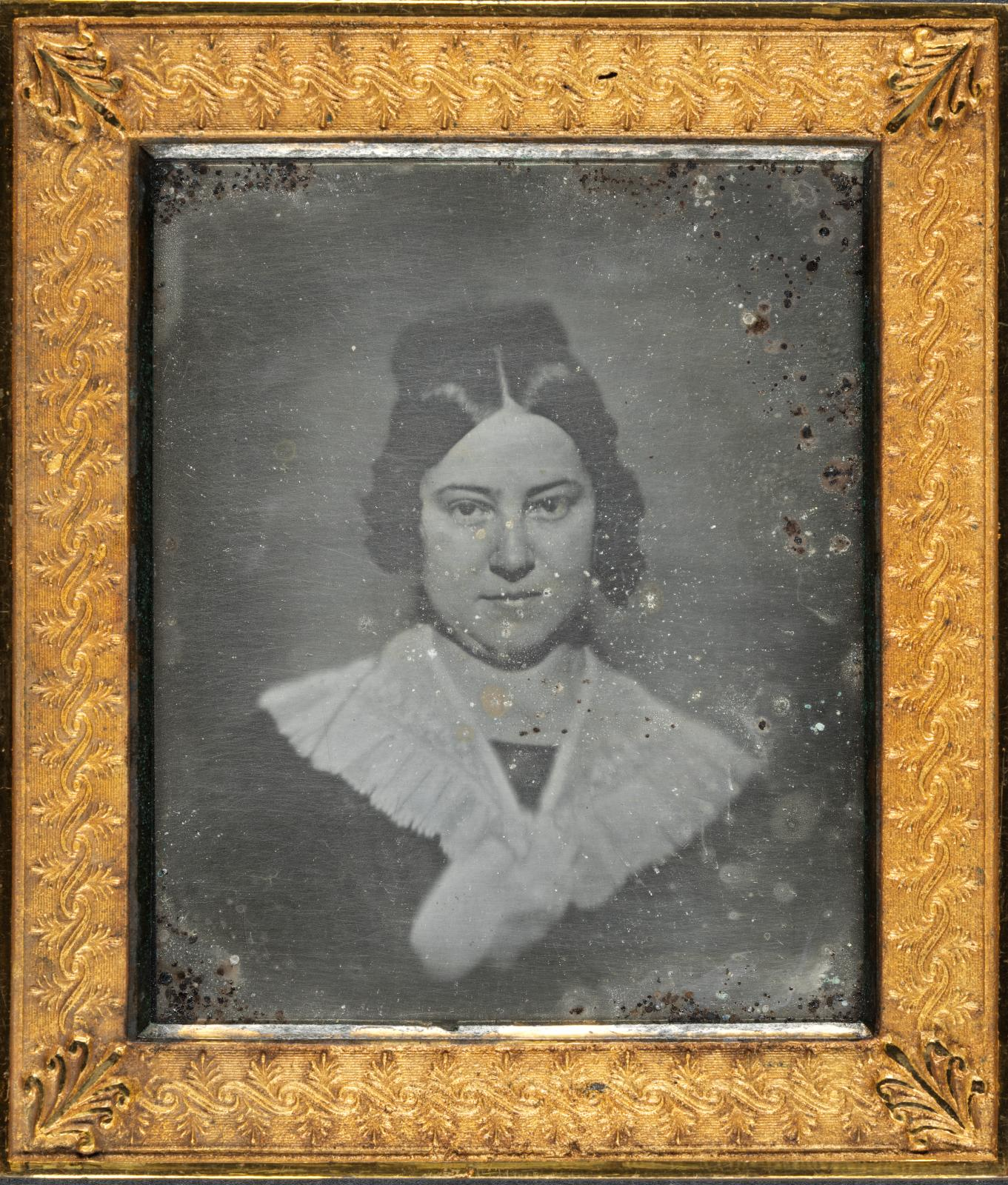
Unidentified Woman, May 1840

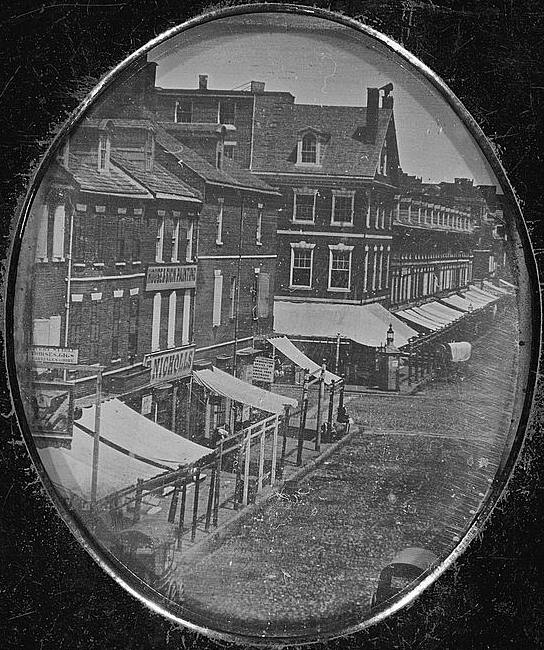
View from the Cornelius studio, Philadelphia 8th & Market Street in May 1840.

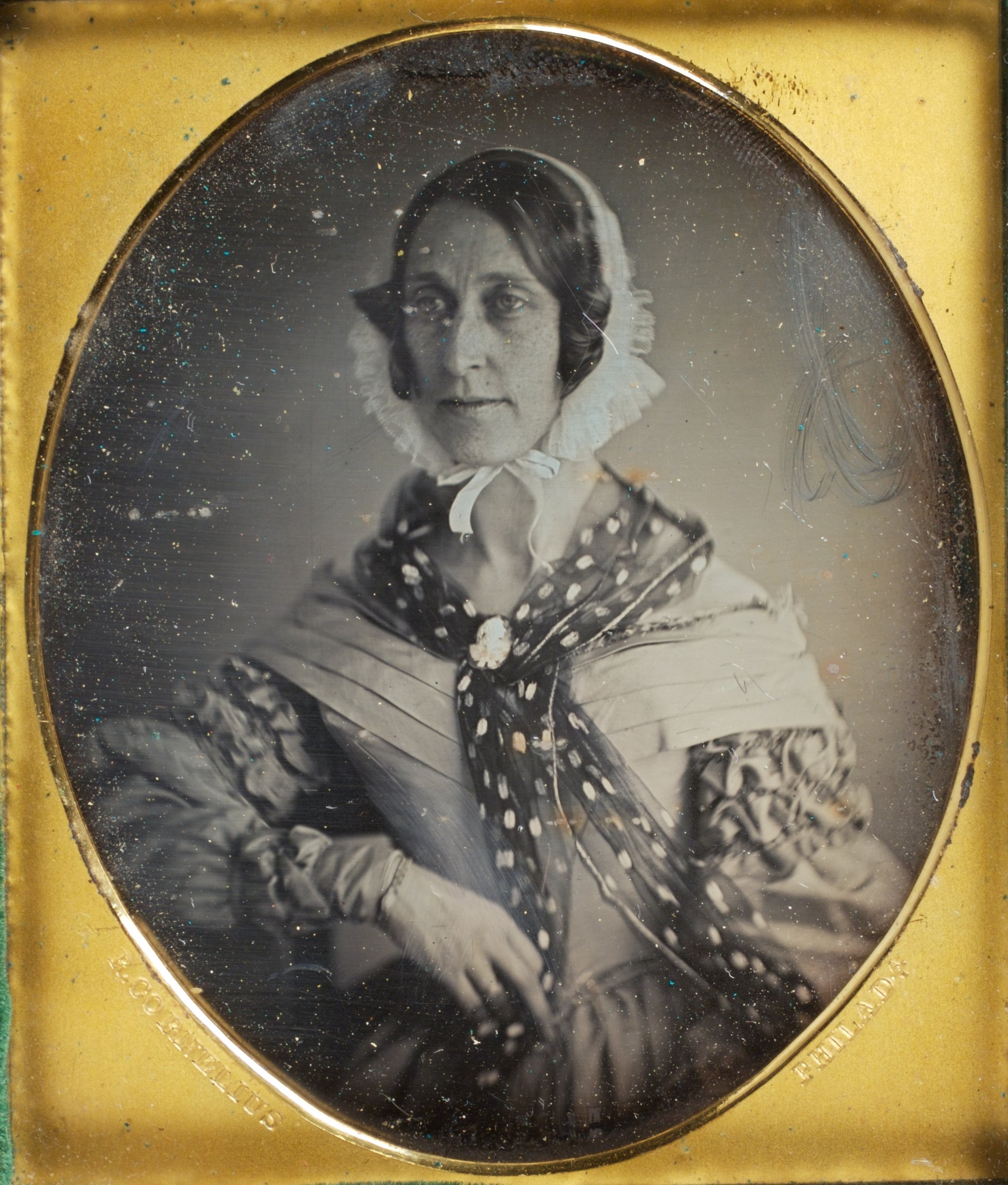
Grandma Toppan, c. 1841

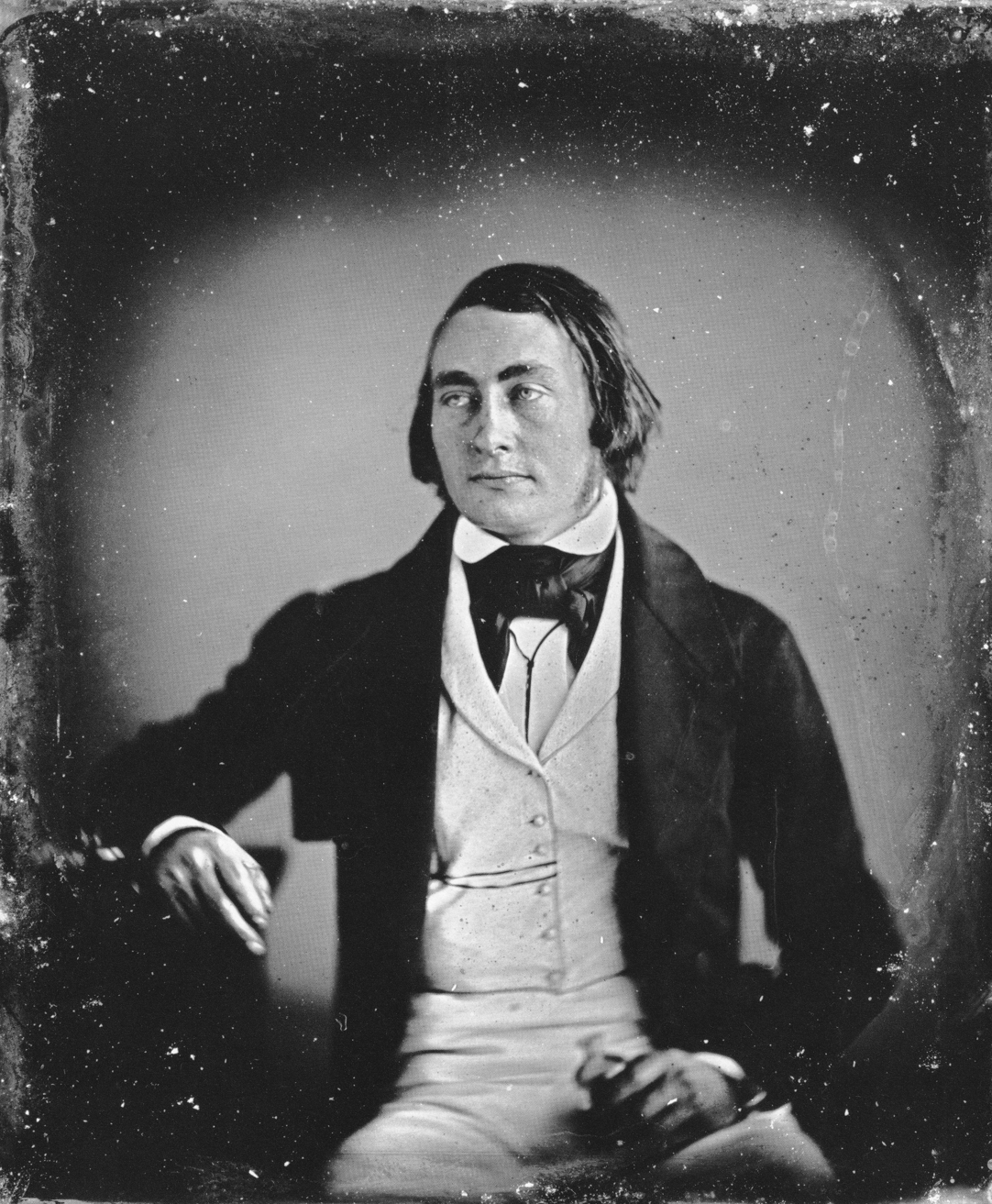
Martin Hans Boyè, May 19, 1842
