= József Lénárd Weber =

Hungarian sculptor

József Lénárd Weber (1702–1773) was a Hungarian sculptor.

Weber was born in Świdnica, into a family of sculptors. He is known to have worked on the sacristy at Staré Brno and the facade at St Thomas's Abbey, Brno. From his children's birth records, it is established he moved to Buda sometime before 1753. He executed stone sculptures of "Faith, Hope" and "Charity" above the portal of St. Anne's church from 1765, and some figures for the St. Florian Chapel from 1761 to 1766. He had seven children, one of whom was born in 1738, took his father's name, and became a sculptor as well. Weber died in Buda in 1773.
