= Pieter Fontijn =

Dutch painter and drawer

Pieter Fontijn (5 January 1773, in Dordrecht – 10 September 1839, in Dordrecht) was a Dutch painter and drawer.

Fontijn painted primarily portraits and miniatures. His drawings were popular with collectors. Some of his works can be found at the Dordrechts Museum. He was a member of the Confrerie Pictura.
