= Avellaneda (disambiguation) =

Avellaneda is a city in Gran Buenos Aires, Buenos Aires Province, Argentina.

Avellaneda may also refer to:

== Places ==
- Avellaneda Department (disambiguation), two in Argentina
- Avellaneda Partido, Partido in Gran Buenos Aires, Buenos Aires Province, Argentina
- Parque Avellaneda, a barrio of Buenos Aires proper (capital district) and not identical with the provincial department
- Avellaneda Park, a park in Parque Avellaneda, Buenos Aires
- Avellaneda, Ávila, city in Castile-León, Spain
- Avellaneda, La Rioja, village in La Rioja, Spain
- Avellaneda, Santa Fe, city in Santa Fe Province, Argentina
- Avellaneda, Córdoba, settlement in Córdoba Province, Argentina

== People ==
- Alonso Fernández de Avellaneda, pseudonym of a 17th-century Spanish writer, author of an unauthorized sequel to Don Quixote
- Gertrudis Gómez de Avellaneda, Cuban writer of the 19th century
- Marco Avellaneda, mathematician
- Mario Avellaneda, Spanish race walker
- Nicolás Avellaneda, former president of Argentina

== Music ==
- Avellaneda is the title of the second album on the label Rune Grammofon by the Danish electronica group Skyphone. The title is related to Alonso Fernández de Avellaneda
