= Dulcinea del Toboso =

- Don Quixote character
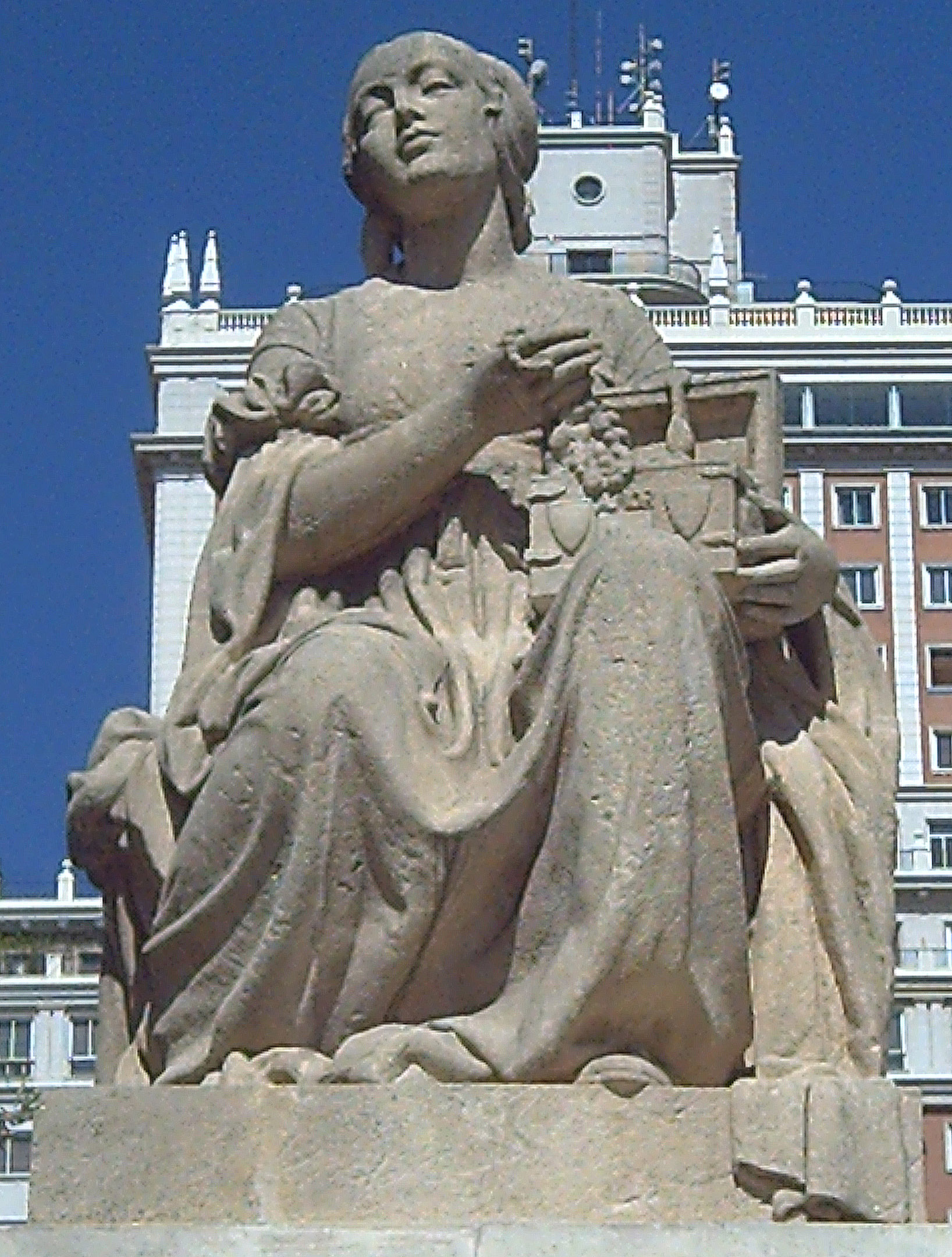
- Dulcinea (1957), sculpture by F. Coullaut-Valera, in Madrid (Spain).
- Created by: Miguel de Cervantes

In-universe information
- Gender: Female
- Family: Lorenzo Gonzalo (father); Aldonza Nogales (mother)
- Religion: Roman Catholic
- Nationality: Spanish

Dulcinea del Toboso is a fictional character who is unseen in Miguel de Cervantes's novel Don Quixote. Don Quixote believes he must have a lady to whom to direct his courtly love and homage, according to his understanding, nurtured by chivalric literature, that the knightly life requires it. As he does not have one, he invents her, making her the very model of female perfection: "[h]er name is Dulcinea, her country El Toboso, a village of La Mancha, her rank must be at least that of a princess, since she is my queen and lady, and her beauty superhuman, since all the impossible and fanciful attributes of beauty which the poets apply to their ladies are verified in her; for her hairs are gold, her forehead Elysian fields, her eyebrows rainbows, her eyes suns, her cheeks roses, her lips coral, her teeth pearls, her neck alabaster, her bosom marble, her hands ivory, her fairness snow, and what modesty conceals from sight such, I think and imagine, as rational reflection can only extol, not compare" (Part I, Chapter 13, translation of John Ormsby).

Don Quixote is portrayed as both admirable ("and doth she not of a truth accompany and adorn this greatness with a thousand million charms of mind!" "that, winnowed by her hands, beyond a doubt the bread it made was of the whitest.") and ridiculous throughout the novel. His squire Sancho Panza knows this, and is enthusiastic for Dulcinea in as much as "if your worship goes looking for dainties in the bottom of the sea".

Dulcinea is based on the Spanish word dulce (sweet), and suggests an overly elegant "sweetness". To this day, a reference to someone as one's "Dulcinea" implies idealistic devotion and love for her.

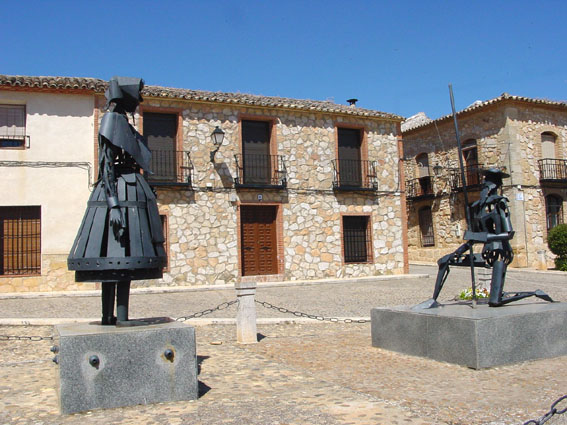
Monument to Don Quixote and Dulcinea, Castilla-La Mancha, Spain.

== Spurious Part II of the work ==
An unidentified writer using the pseudonym Alonso Fernández de Avellaneda in 1614 published a Part II of Don Quijote.

Although support for Avellaneda's view of Dulcinea is found in Part I of Don Quixote, he has little interest in the glorious, imaginary Dulcinea. Scholars commonly say that because of this and many similar misreadings by Avellaneda, which Cervantes found offensive, he was motivated to complete his own unfinished Part II, which was published the following year. ("...especially my lady the princess Dulcinea, who staggers one's senses." "...who went skipping and capering like goats over the pleasant fields there...")

== Opera ==
The Jules Massenet opera Don Quichotte depicts Dulcinée as a major character, the local queen who sends the knight on a quest to retrieve her jewels.

== In literature and the arts ==
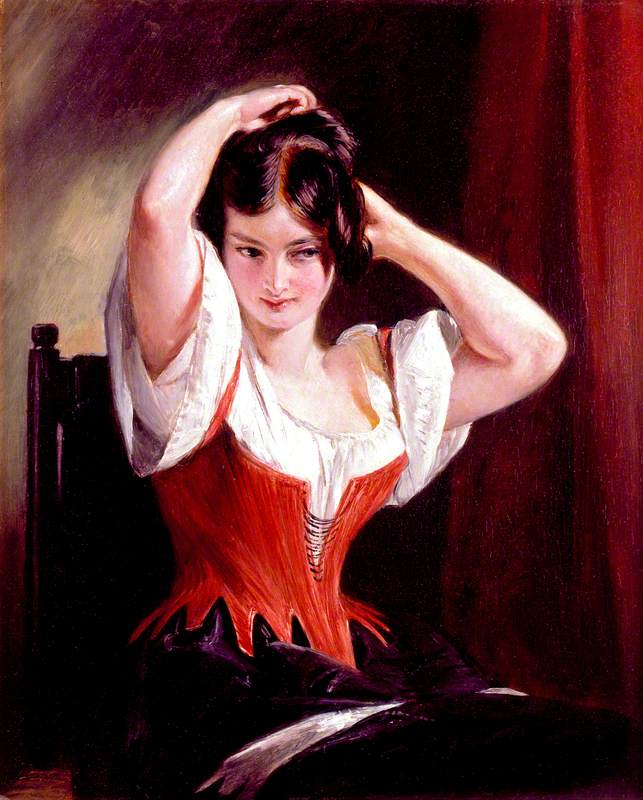
Dulcinea del Toboso by Charles Robert Leslie, 1839

- A prostitute named Aldonza is the female lead and identified as "Dulcinea" in Man of La Mancha, an adaptation of the Quixote story, and its subsequent movie adaptation.
- The French composer Maurice Ravel composed Don Quichotte à Dulcinée (1932–33), a cycle of three songs for baritone voice and accompaniment.
- Dulcinea is the female lead in the TV series The Adventures of Puss in Boots.
- Dulcinea appears in the Japanese series Zukkoke Knight – Don De La Mancha. Her real name is Fedora (in the English dub). She is the daughter of the bandit king Poormouth. Her role is to help her bankrupt father by stealing, but she fails almost every time. She fools Don Quixote into helping her. She is voiced by Mami Koyama.
- "Dulcinea" is the title of the first episode of the Syfy television show The Expanse.
- Dulcinea Septimus is the name of the heir to the Seventh House in The Locked Tomb series of novels, and her relationship to Palamedes Sextus follows the format of a beautiful lady out of reach.
- In Canto VII of the South Korean video game Limbus Company, Dulcinea is one of the "kindreds" of the video game's interpretation of Alonso Quijano. Dulcinea is also the leader of the parade of "La Mancha land" and serves as the second boss of the act who resides in the third area of the Canto.
- Alternative rock band Toad the Wet Sprocket explore themes of unseen motivation on their 1994 album Dulcinea, drawing comparisons to the character.
- "Dulcinea" is the title of a song by post-metal band Isis on their 2006 album In the Absence of Truth.
- In "Don Quixote" ballet, Dulcinea also makes an appearance in the second act, during the dream scene.

== See also ==
- List of Don Quixote characters
