= Sancho Panza and the Duchess =

Painting by Charles Robert Leslie

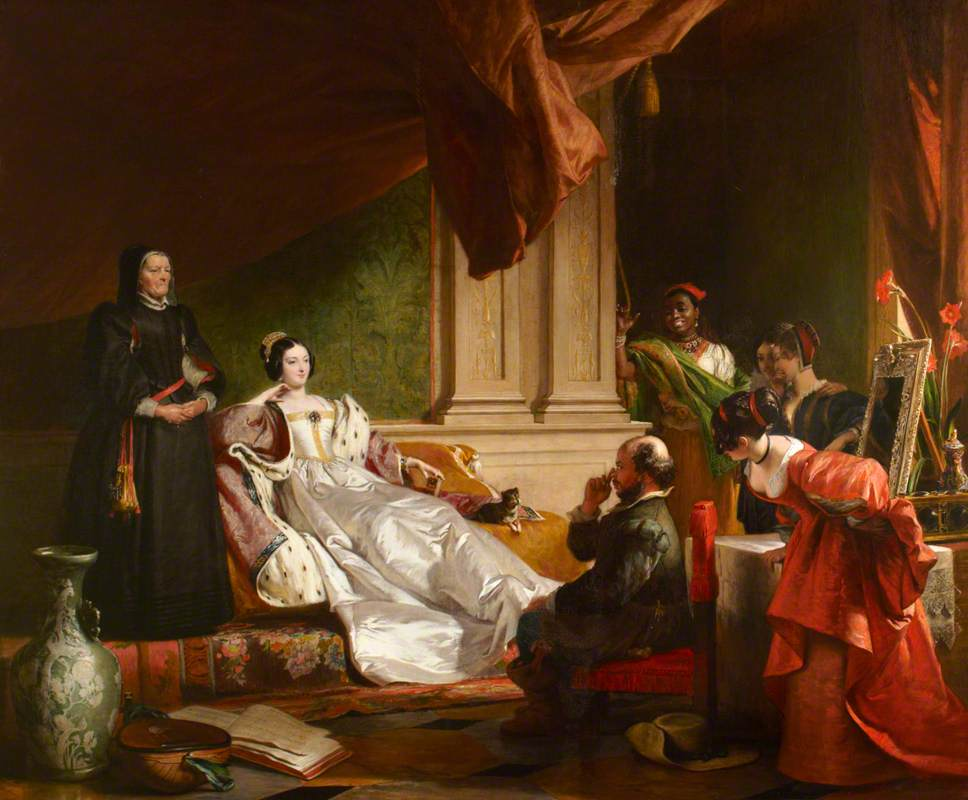
- Artist: Charles Robert Leslie
- Year: 1824
- Type: Oil on canvas, genre painting
- Dimensions: 100.3 cm × 123.2 cm (39.5 in × 48.5 in)
- Location: Petworth House, Petworth

Sancho Panza and the Duchess is an 1824 oil-on-canvas painting by the American artist Charles Robert Leslie.

== History and description ==
It is inspired by a scene from the classic novel Don Quixote by Miguel de Cervantes. Don Quixote's servant Sancho Panza is shown conversing with the Aragonese Duchess. The scene takes place in a sumptuous room in her palace. The duchess, all dressed in white, seems amused and interested while talking with Don Quixote's squire, who appears touching his nose. An old lady-in-waiting, dressed in black, watches from the left, seemingly unimpressed, while a little dog sits to the right. Four young ladies-in-waiting, one of them black, watch the scene, visibly amused with Sancho Panza. At the bottom left of the painting stands a vase, with a lute and a music book lying in the ground.

Leslie produced a number of scenes based on scenes from famous literature, a popular genre in the late Regency and early Victorian. The work was displayed at the Royal Academy Exhibition of 1824 at Somerset House in London. It was then acquired by the aristocratic art collector George Wyndham, 3rd Earl of Egremont for his country estate Petworth House in Sussex. It remains in the private collection at Petworth, on loan to the National Trust.

The painting is featured in the background of the Portrait of the Earl of Egremont by Thomas Phillips.

== See also ==
- Dulcinea del Toboso, an 1839 painting by Leslie also based on the novel

== Bibliography ==
- Marter, Joan M. The Grove Encyclopedia of American Art. Oxford University Press, 2011.
