= Portrait of the Earl of Egremont =

Painting by Thomas Phillips

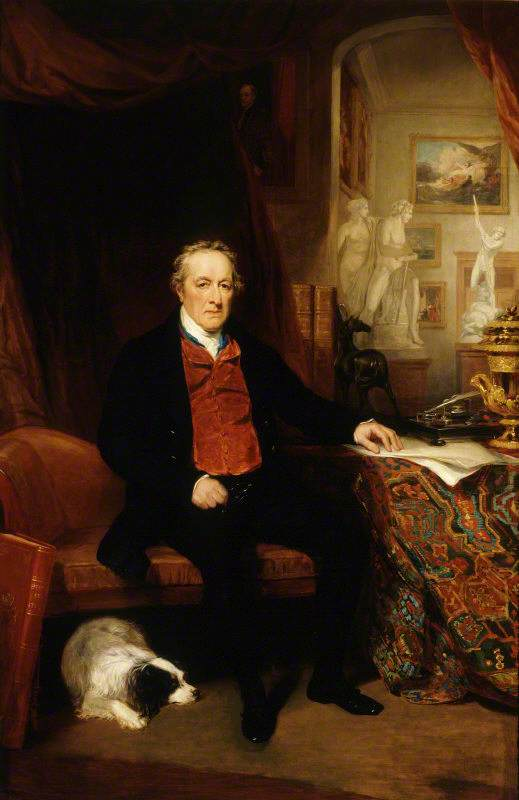
- Artist: Thomas Phillips
- Year: 1839
- Type: Oil on canvas, portrait painting
- Dimensions: 187 cm × 155 cm (74 in × 61 in)
- Location: Petworth House, Petworth

Portrait of the Earl of Egremont is an 1839 portrait painting by the English artist Thomas Phillips. It depicts the aristocrat George Wyndham, 3rd Earl of Egremont. Egremont was a wealthy landowner known as a celebrated art collector and patron of artists such as Phillips and J.M.W. Turner. He is shown in the North Gallery at Petworth House in Sussex with paintings and sculptures in the background. Amongst the works that feature in the background are Turner's Egremont Seapiece, William Hilton's The Rape of Europa and Charles Robert Leslie's Sancho Panza and the Duchess.

The painting was produced posthumously and displayed at the Royal Academy Exhibition of 1839 at the National Gallery in London. It remains in the collection at Petworth House, under the conservation of the National Trust.

== See also ==
- The Allied Sovereigns at Petworth, an 1817 painting by Phillips also featuring Egremont

== Bibliography ==
- Baker, Malcolm & Reist, Inge. Sculpture Collections in Europe and the United States 1500-1930: Variety and Ambiguity. Brill, 2021.
- Rowell, Christopher, Warrell, Ian & Brown, David Blayney. Turner at Petworth. Harry N. Abrams, 2002.
