= Memoirs of the Life of John Constable =

1843 biography

- Author: Charles Robert Leslie
- Language: English
- Genre: Biography
- Publisher: Longman, Brown, Green, Longmans, and Roberts
- Publication date: 1843
- Publication place: United Kingdom
- Media type: Print

Memoirs of the Life of John Constable is an 1843 biography written by the Anglo-American artist and writer Charles Robert Leslie about his fellow painter John Constable, a celebrated landscape painter of the Regency era. Leslie had been a long-standing friend of Constable who had died in 1837. His work drew heavily on Constable's letters and strongly influenced public perceptions of him for the next century. A second edition was published in 1845.

== Bibliography ==
- Gray, Anne & Gage, John. Constable: Impressions of Land, Sea and Sky. National Gallery of Australia, 2006.
- Herrmann, Luke. Nineteenth Century British Painting. Charles de la Mare, 2000.
- Karlsson Henrik & Biggs, Michael . The Routledge Companion to Research in the Arts. Taylor & Francis, 2010.
- Marter, Joan M. (ed.) The Grove Encyclopedia of American Art: Volume 2. Oxford University Press, 2011.
