= Jerónimo de Pasamonte =

Spanish military man, monk, and writer

Jerónimo de Pasamonte (1553 - after 1605) was a Spanish military man, monk of the Cistercian Order, and a writer of the Golden Age.

He was imprisoned as a slave on a galley for 20 years, and wrote an autobiographical narrative of his experiences, published in 1603.

== See also ==
- Alonso Fernández de Avellaneda
