= Avellaneda Department =

Avellaneda Department may refer to:

- Avellaneda Department, Río Negro
- Avellaneda Department, Santiago del Estero

== See also ==
- Avellaneda (disambiguation)
