= Avellaneda Park Historic Train =

Coordinates: 34.660313°S 58.502884°W

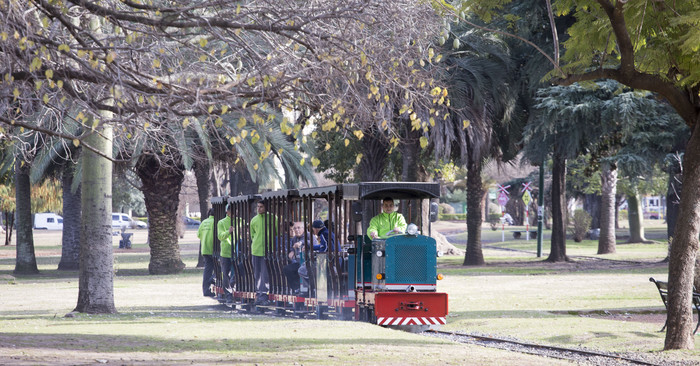
- The train after the reopening, July 2015

Overview
- Service type: Tourist railway
- Status: Active
- Locale: Avellaneda Park, Buenos Aires
- First service: 1936; 90 years ago

Route
- Distance travelled: 1,600 m.
- Average journey time: 15'

On-board services
- Class: Single

Technical
- Track owner: City of Buenos Aires

The Avellaneda Park Historic Train (native name: Tren Histórico del Parque Avellaneda), colloquially known as "Expreso Alegría" ("Joy Express" in English) is a narrow gauge train that runs inside Avellaneda Park of Parque Avellaneda district, in the southwest of Buenos Aires, Argentina.

== History ==
In 1908, the Buenos Aires Legislature carried out a public tender to build a railway that ran through the Buenos Aires Zoo, which was completed and opened one year later. The train was towed by Deutz locomotives, manufactured in Germany.

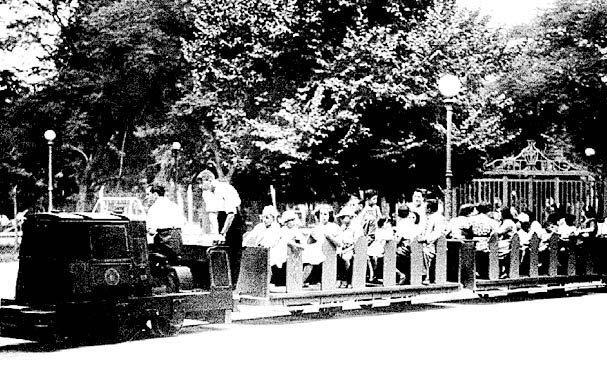
The train carrying a group of children in the 1930s

In 1929 the train was moved to Avellaneda Park, alleging that it would be useful to transport people to "polideportivo" (sports center) located in the park. The service was officially opened in 1936, being named "Expreso Alegría" and operated by Genovese Juan Cugusi who was in charge of the service. The train departed from Clemente Onelli station. It was free for children going to the holiday home of the park, three times a week. Some versions state that the rolling stock was manufactured by French company Decauville.

The train ran a short circular track of 1,300 m inside Avellaneda Park, surrounding the "Casona Olivera (Olivera Mansion)", a former farmstead bought by Domingo Olivera in 1868 for cattle and originally named "Estancia Los Remedios". The house also served as military barracks and field hospital during some armed conflicts in Buenos Aires. In 1912 Olivera sold the house to the Government of Buenos Aires with the condition that a park should be built there. In 1912 the "Olivera Park" (then renamed "Avellaneda") was opened and the house preserved. Other points approached by the train were the "Garden of Meditation", the carrousel, the former swimming centre, the dairy and several outdoor sculptures.

The golden age of the Park Avellaneda Train was in the 1950s when two Ruston & Hornsby diesel locomotives had to be added due to the increasing number of passengers. Bigger and more comfortable coaches were also added to service because the previous ones did not have roof.

=== Decline and reopening ===
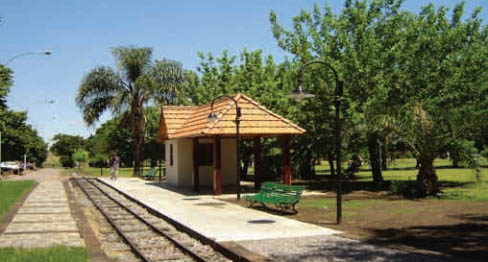
Onelli station as seen in 2005

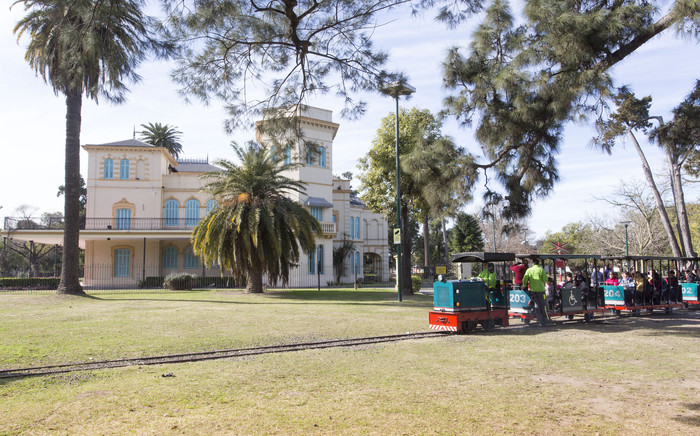
Train running near the Olivera Mansion, July 2015

Due to the lack of maintenance, Park Avellaneda Train ceased operations in 1998. Trains would be put into service again in 2000 but just for a few months before it was closed again. Since then, a group of neighbors worked together to bring the train back. They acquired an Arnold Jung locomotive and three Orenstein & Koppel coaches. Finally, in May 2006 the reopened line made its inaugural trip inside Avellaneda Park. An opening ceremony was conducted, and it was attended by the Chief of Government Jorge Telerman among other personalities. Nevertheless, and despite the efforts for the reopening, the service would be closed soon after.

There were several attempts to reactivate the service but they had not been carried out. The last project was sent to the Legislature in 2014. In July 2015, it was announced that the service would be reactivated after a restoration that took 9 years, The train would only run on Saturdays from 9 to 17 h. In August 2015, the locomotive and three coaches were ready to run, with the last coach (of a total of four) still under repair.

The service was reopened on Saturday 29 August 2015. The trains had been repaired and restored and it was also announced that the carriages would cease to be identified by numbers, and instead use the names of well known historical figures from the neighbourhood, chosen by its residents. Similarly, the terminal station was repaired, along with the line's signals and workshop for the train. The City of Buenos Aires also announced that the train would also run on Tuesdays exclusively for school trips. In 2020 the train was again deactivated, after layoffs from the city government and a lack of funding and repairs.

== See also ==
- List of heritage railways
