= Portrait of John Everett Millais =

Painting by Charles Robert Leslie

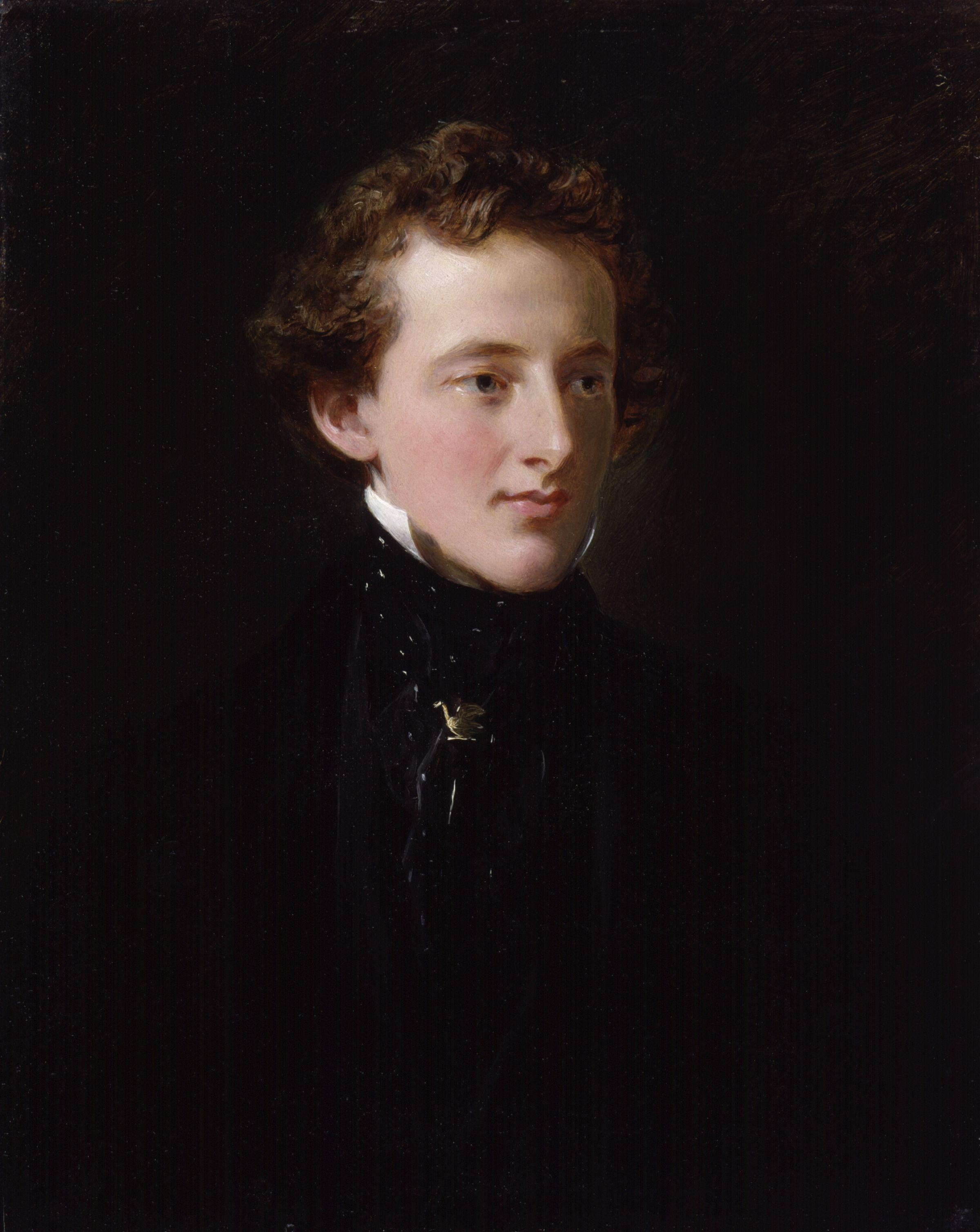
- Artist: Charles Robert Leslie
- Year: 1852
- Type: Oil on canvas, portrait
- Dimensions: 30.6 cm × 25.2 cm (12.0 in × 9.9 in)
- Location: National Portrait Gallery; London

Portrait of John Everett Millais is an 1852 portrait painting by the Anglo-American artist Charles Robert Leslie of the British painter John Everett Millais.

Millais emerged as a member of the Pre-Raphaelite Brotherhood in the late 1840s. His work was championed by the critic John Ruskin. He later served briefly as President of the Royal Academy before his death in 1896. Today the work is in the collection of the National Portrait Gallery in London. It was acquired by the bequest of the art collector Henry Vaughan.

== Bibliography ==
- Grilli, Stephanie Jeanne. Pre-Raphaelite Portraiture, 1848-1854. Yale University, 1980.
- Hammacher, Abraham Marie. Phantoms of the Imagination: Fantasy in Art and Literature from Blake to Dali. H. N. Abrams, 1981.
- Hilton, Timothy. John Ruskin. Yale University Press, 2002.
