= Dulcinea del Toboso (painting) =

Painting by Charles Robert Leslie

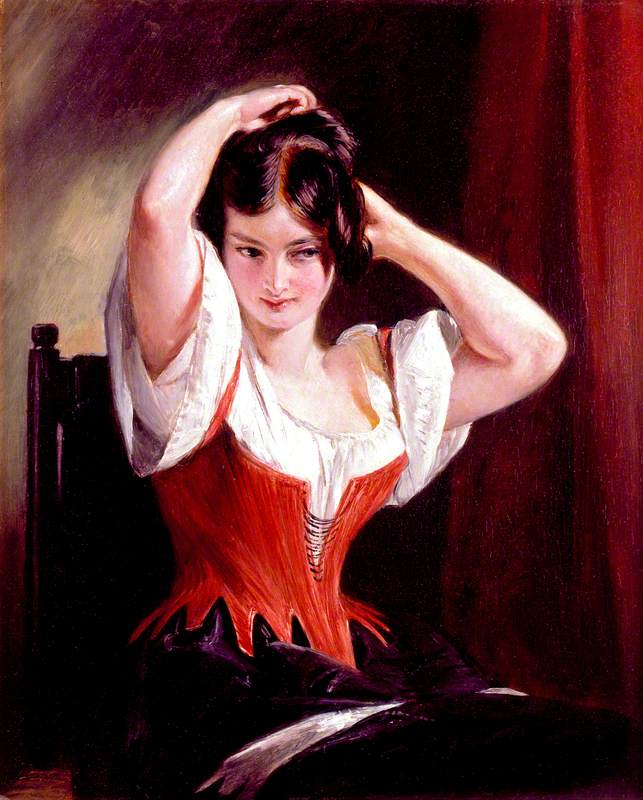
- Artist: Charles Robert Leslie
- Year: 1839
- Type: Oil on panel, genre painting
- Dimensions: 30.5 cm × 25.4 cm (12.0 in × 10.0 in)
- Location: Victoria and Albert Museum, London

Dulcinea del Toboso is an oil painting by the American-British artist Charles Robert Leslie, dating to 1839. It portrays the fictional character of Dulcinea del Toboso from Miguel de Cervantes's classic novel Don Quixote.

== History and description ==
Charles Robert Leslie was known for his paintings based on scenes from popular literature. The painting was displayed at the Royal Academy Exhibition of 1839 at the National Gallery. One critic objected to the title of the painting, calling it a "misnomer" as it was in fact "a very carefully painted picture of a buxom country wench" – overlooking the fact that this was exactly what Dulcinea del Toboso was, outside the delusions of Don Quixote. Leslie did, however, depart from the novel's description of Dulcinea as "golden-haired", by electing to depict her with dark or reddish hair.

Today the painting is in the collection of the Victoria and Albert Museum in South Kensington, London, having been given as part of the Sheepshanks Gift collection by John Sheepshanks in 1857.

== Bibliography ==
- Roe, Sonia. Oil Paintings in Public Ownership in the Victoria and Albert Museum. Public Catalogue Foundation, 2008.
- Yeazall, Ruth Bernard. Picture Titles: How and Why Western Paintings Acquired Their Names. Princeton University Press, 2015.
