= Alonso Fernández de Avellaneda =

Author's pseudonym

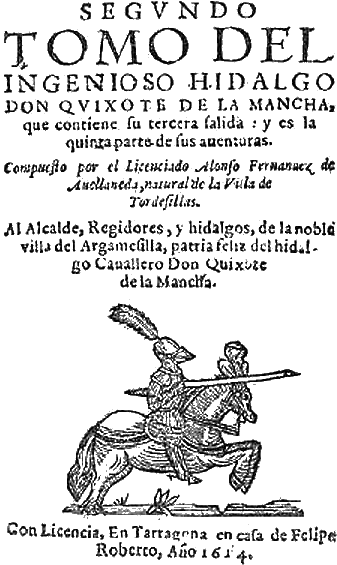
Cover of Avellaneda's Quixote.

Alonso Fernández de Avellaneda is the pseudonym of a man who wrote an apocryptical sequel to Cervantes' Don Quixote, before Cervantes finished and published his own second volume.

The identity of Avellaneda has been the subject of many theories, but there is no consensus on who he was. Cervantes knew that Avellaneda was a pseudonym and that the volume's publication information was false. Cervantes also indicated four times in the second part of his Don Quixote that Avellaneda was from Aragon.

One theory holds that Avellaneda's work was a collaboration by friends of Lope de Vega, although none of them were from Aragon. Another theory is that it was by Gerónimo de Passamonte, born in Aragon, the real-life inspiration for the character Ginés de Pasamonte of Part I. In fact, Avellaneda knows and praises the Brotherhood of the Santísimo Rosario of Calatayud, and there is only one candidate who could have known that brotherhood: Jerónimo de Pasamonte, who wrote in his autobiography that he entered that same brotherhood at the age of 13.

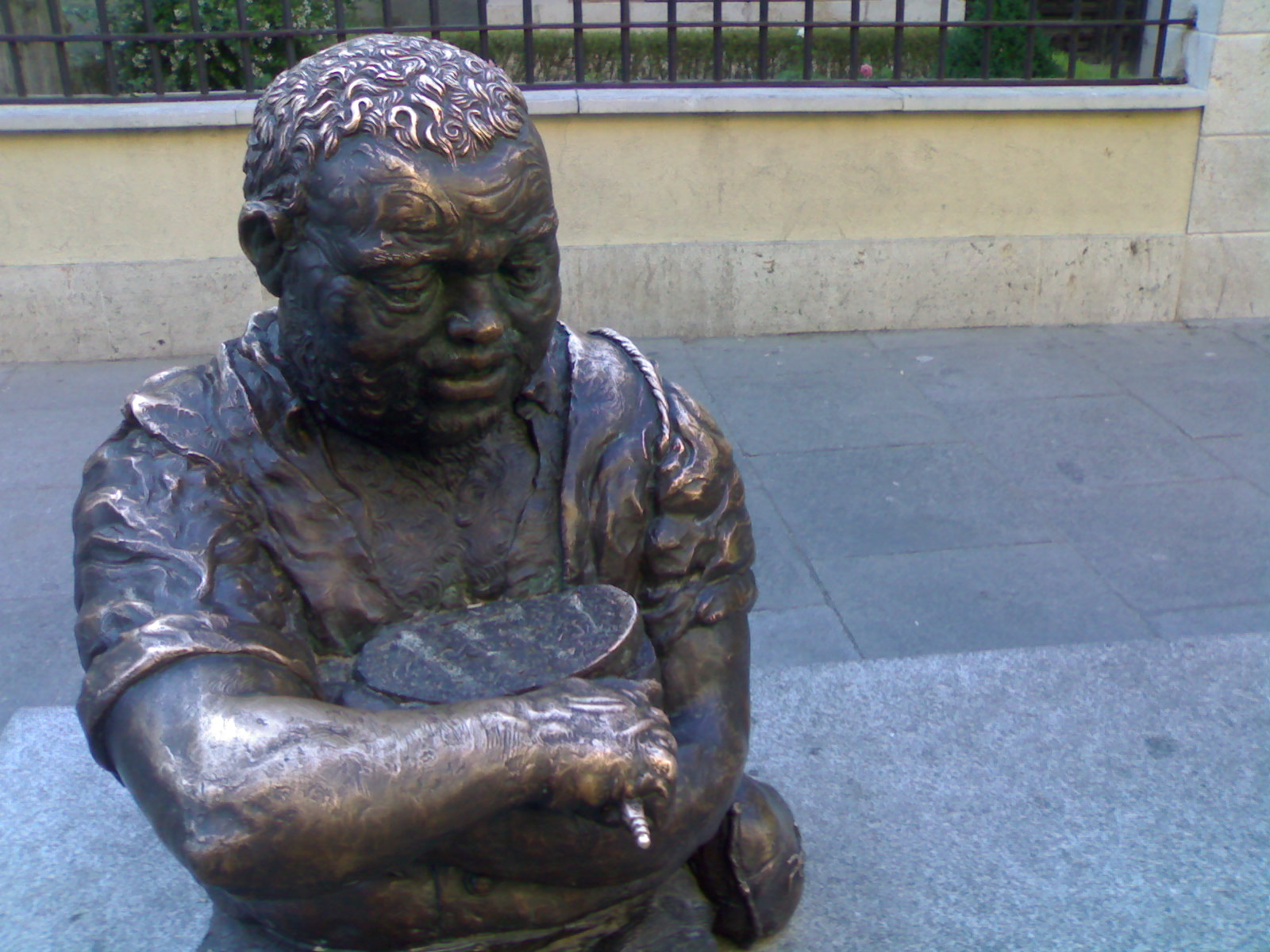
Statue of Sancho Panza, whose wife is called "Teresona Panza" by Alonso

Critical opinion has generally held Avellaneda's work in low regard, and Cervantes himself is highly critical of it in his own Part 2. However, it is possible that Cervantes would never have composed his own continuation without the stimulus Avellaneda provided.

Throughout Part 2 of Cervantes' book, Don Quixote meets characters who know of him from their reading of his Part 1, but in Chapter 59, Don Quixote first learns of Avellaneda's Part 2. In that chapter, Don Quixote meets two characters who are reading Avellaneda's recently published book. One of those characters is called Jerónimo, like Jerónimo de Pasamonte, which could be another indication from Cervantes about the identity of Avellaneda. The character hands over the apocryphal book to Don Quixote, recognizing him as the true one. Cervantes would have made the literary representation of Avellaneda, personified in the character known as Jerónimo, recognize his Don Quixote as the true one. Don Quixote is outraged because Avellaneda portrays him as being no longer in love with Dulcinea del Toboso. As a result, Don Quixote decides not to go to Zaragoza to take part in the jousts, as he had planned, because such an incident features in that book.

From then on, Avellaneda's work is ridiculed frequently; Don Quixote even meets one of its characters, Don Alvaro Tarfe, and gets him to swear an affidavit that he has never met the true Don Quixote before.

== Humour ==
There is evidence that some of Cervantes' condemnations are of tongue-in-cheek references to errors or jokes in Part 1. In Part 2, Chapter 59, of Cervantes's version, Don Quixote disregards Avellaneda's Part 2 because in it Sancho Panza's wife is called Mari Gutiérrez, instead of Teresa Panza. However, in the early chapters of Part 1 Sancho's wife is called by many names, some within just two paragraphs, including Juana Panza, Mari Gutiérrez, Juana Gutiérrez, Teresa Cascajo, etc. Teresa Panza is settled on only after she becomes a substantial character. It is difficult to decide whether they are true mistakes since malapropisms, aliases and puns are a running joke throughout the books. Cide Hamete Benengeli is called "Berengena" (eggplant), Teresa is called "Teresona Panza" (approximately "Fat Belly"), etc.

== Translations ==
Avellaneda's work was first translated into French, by an anonymous translator. Warton (1756) identifies this French translator with Le Sage, but Yardley (1784) doubts.) The French translation omits or replaces some of Avellaneda's episodes, and completely alters the ending. In the Spanish original, Don Quixote is left "in health and readiness for farther atchievements," but in the French translation, he is shot in a firefight with the Holy Brotherhood on the outskirts of his home town of Argamasilla, and ("it is to be supposed") buried within the town.

The French translation was translated into English by John Stevens (1705), and reprinted with additional notes by William Augustus Yardley (1784). Both of these English editions preserve the French ending in which Quixote dies.

It was translated again by a Mr. Baker in 1745 in two volumes published by Paul Vaillant in London.

An anonymous three-volume direct translation of a Spanish edition corrected by Don Isidro Perales y Torres appeared in Swaffham in 1805

Server and Keller (1980) provided the second English edition translated directly from Avellaneda's original. Their book, with footnotes by Tom Lathrop, was published by Lathrop's Juan de la Cuesta Hispanic Monographs press in 1980 and reissued in 2009.
