= Parque Avellaneda =

Coordinates: 34°38′41″S 58°28′46″W

- Neighborhood of Buenos Aires
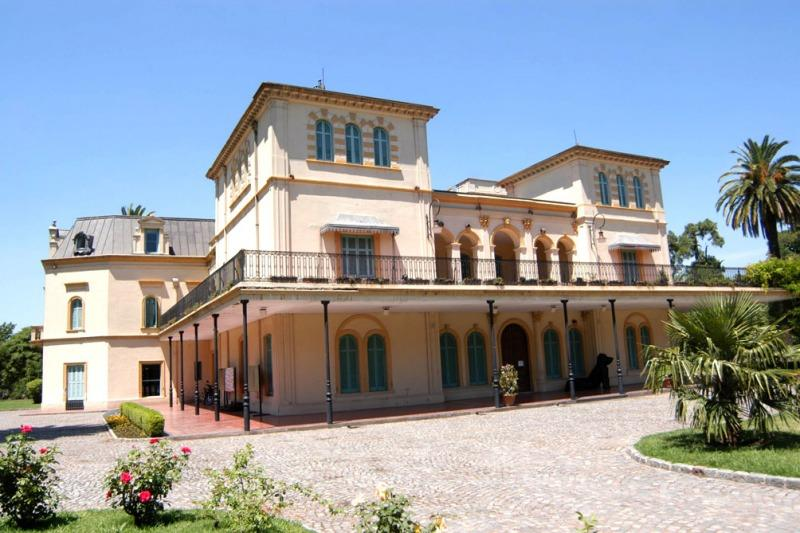
- The former Olivera mansion

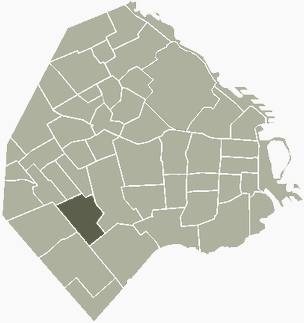
- Location of Parque Avellaneda within Buenos Aires
- Country: Argentina
- Autonomous City: Buenos Aires
- Comuna: Comuna 9

Area
  - Total: 5.2 km^{2} (2.0 sq mi)

Population
  - Total: 54,191
  - Density: 10,000/km^{2} (27,000/sq mi)
- Time zone: UTC-3 (ART)

Parque Avellaneda is a neighbourhood located in the Southwest of Buenos Aires. It is named after Nicolás Avellaneda, former President of Argentina and originated in a 1755 deed given to the Brotherhood of Holy Charity of Jesus Christ. The Brotherhood built an orphanage and a herbal remedy plantation known as the "Remedy Farm." The Olivera family became the area's largest landowners in 1828 and their sale of the majority of their estate to the city of Buenos Aires resulted in the creation of Avellaneda Park (the barrio's namesake) in 1914. The park still houses the Olivera manor house, with the Chacra de los Remedios Cultural Complex operating out of the estate.

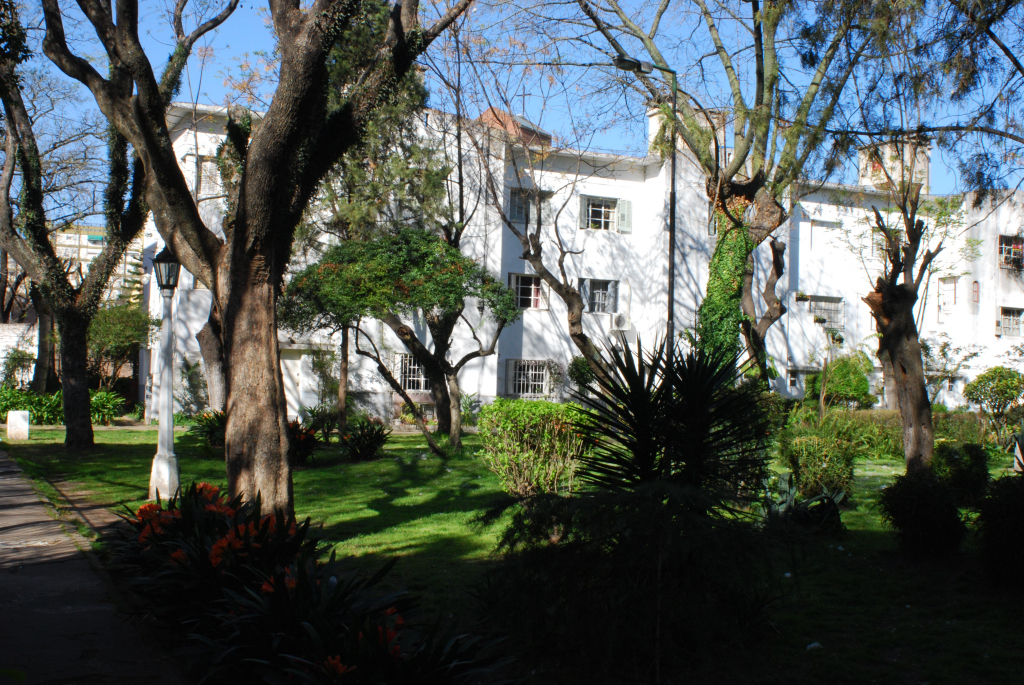
Townhouses in the area

== See also ==
- Avellaneda Park Historic Train
- Avellaneda Park
