= Avellaneda Park =

Park in Buenos Aires, Argentina

Coordinates: 34°38′44″S 58°28′43″W

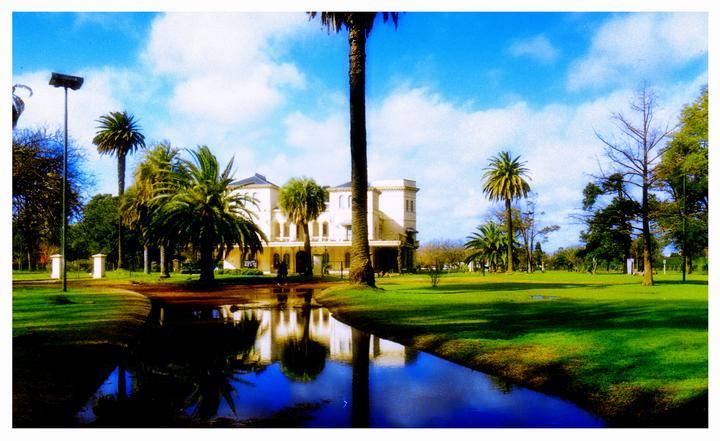
The former Olivera mansion

Avellaneda Park (Spanish: Parque Avellaneda) is a public park in Buenos Aires, Argentina. It is located at the heart of the Parque Avellaneda neighbourhood, which takes its name from the park.

== Overview ==
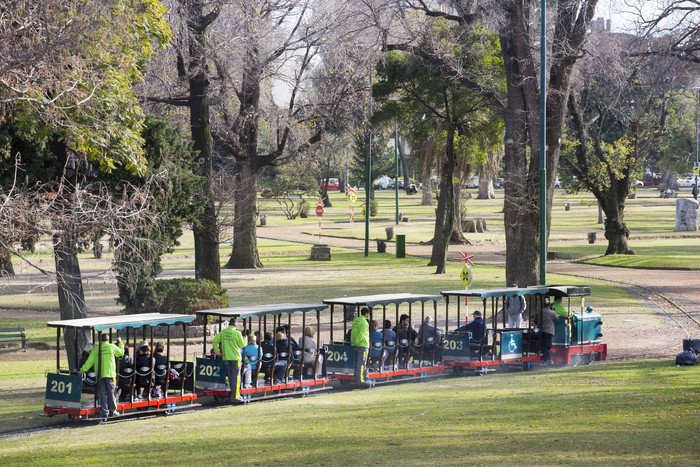
Avellaneda Park Historic Train.

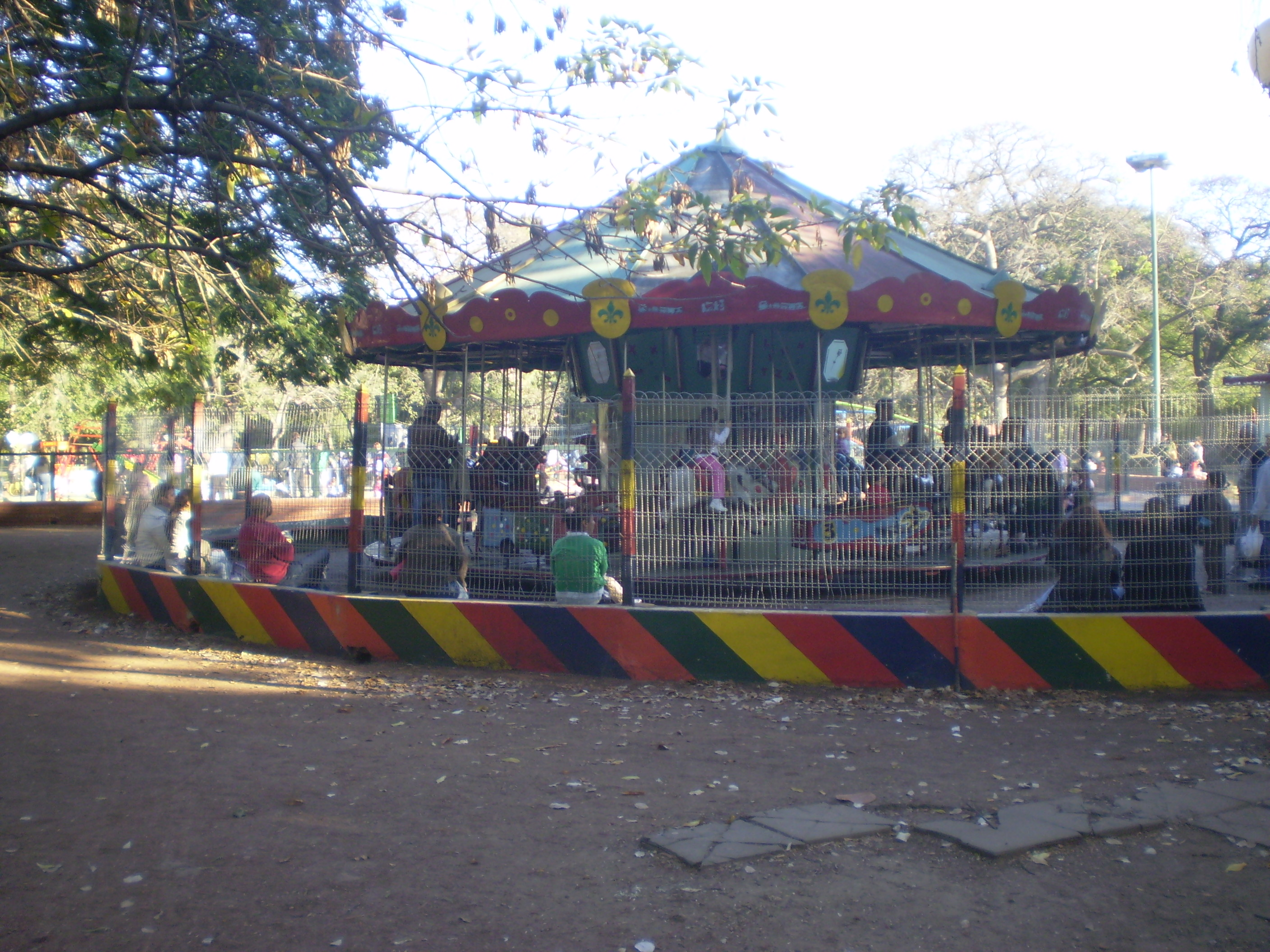
The merry-go-round (installed in 1966, it's one of 52 in the city)

Nearly 5 km (3 mi) west of colonial Buenos Aires, an extensive plot of land was deeded in 1755 to the Brotherhood of the Holy Charity of Jesus Christ. The brotherhood established an orphanage on the site. It also planted the area's largest herbal remedy garden. Domingo Olivera purchased the estate in 1828. He preserved the herbal plantation. He established the country's first agricultural research station on the property. His son Eduardo Olivera became a licensed agronomist. Eduardo co-founded the Sociedad Rural Argentina in 1866.

The city of Buenos Aires acquired the estate from the Olivera family on 7 March 1912. Carlos Thays, then Director General of Parks and Promenades, formally received the land that November. The park opened on 28 March 1914 under the name Olivera Park. City officials renamed it that November in honor of former President Nicolás Avellaneda. Landscape engineer Benito Javier Carrasco, a disciple of Thays, designed much of the park's layout between 1914 and 1918. The 50 hectare (125 acre) park became the city's largest continuous green space. A municipal tree farm opened on the park's western end around 1916–1917, supplying trees and shrubs for landscaping projects across Buenos Aires. Socialist legislator Antonio Zaccagnini founded a vacation colony for undernourished children on the park's grounds in 1919. A miniature train that Clemente Onelli had installed at the Buenos Aires Zoo in 1909 was relocated to the park in 1929. It began regular operation as the "Expreso Alegría" in 1936.

The widening of Francisco Bilbao Avenue during the 1950s separated an 8 hectare (20 acre) southern section of the park, which was converted for use by Edenor, the public electric utility serving the area. The most dramatic change in the park's dimensions, however, took place after military-appointed Mayor Osvaldo Cacciatore's expropriation of a wide swath along Bilbao Avenue in 1977. The land was slated for the Perito Moreno Freeway, one of eight Cacciatore approved (though only three were built). Opened in 1980, the freeway's toll plaza takes up much of what was the park's southern section. These developments and nationwide economic malaise during the 1980s contributed to the park's decline. The first reversal of this came in 1989, when the former Olivera mansion was reopened as a cultural center, following years of disuse. A descendant of the mansion's namesake family, Enrique Olivera, became Mayor of Buenos Aires following the election of his predecessor, Fernando de la Rúa, to the Argentine Presidency. As Vice-Mayor, Olivera had initiated restoration projects for the ailing park and in July 2000, he reopened the Onelli miniature railway and inaugurated the Remedy Farm Cultural Center, a homage to the land's original use.

== See also ==
- Avellaneda Park Historic Train
