= Charles Robert Leslie =

American painter (1794–1859)

Charles R. Leslie
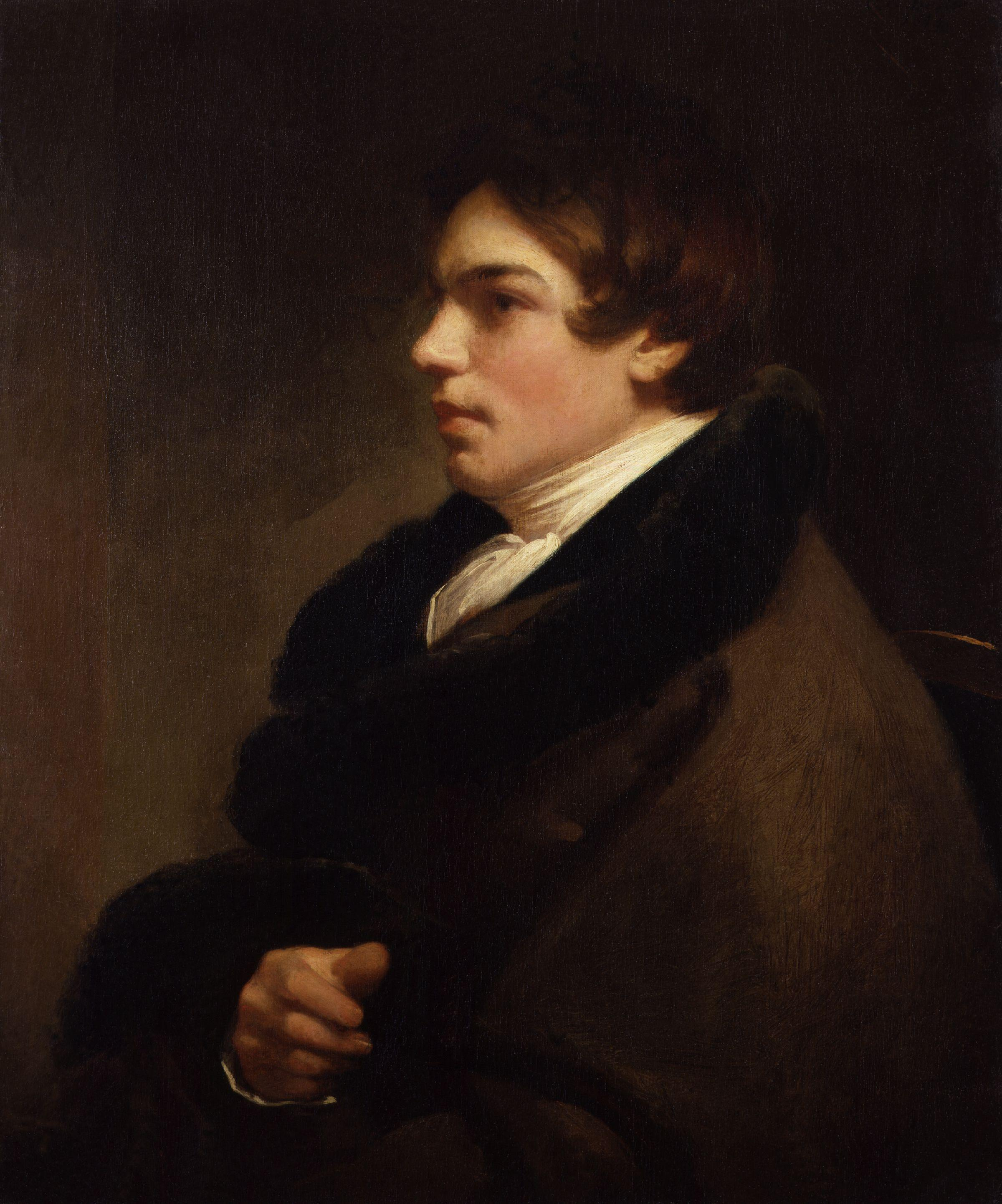
- Self-portrait, 1814
- Born: 19 October 1794; London, England
- Died: 5 May 1859 (aged 64); Abercorn Place, London
- Known for: Genre oil painting, writing

Charles Robert Leslie RA (19 October 1794 – 5 May 1859) was an American genre painter and writer, who was born and spent his career in England.

== Biography ==
Leslie was born in London to American parents. When he was five years of age he returned with them to the United States, where they settled in Philadelphia. Leslie completed his education and afterwards became apprenticed to a bookseller. He was, however, mainly interested in painting and drama, and when George Frederick Cooke visited the city he executed a portrait of the actor from recollection of him on the stage, which was considered a work of such promise that a fund was raised to enable the young artist to study in Europe.

He left for London in 1811, bearing introductions which procured for him the friendship of West, Beechey, Allston, Coleridge and Washington Irving, being admitted as a student of the Royal Academy, where he carried off two silver medals. At first, influenced by West and Fuseli, he essayed high art, and his earliest important subject depicted Saul and the Witch of Endor; but he soon discovered his true aptitude and became a painter of cabinet-pictures, dealing, not like those of David Wilkie, with the contemporary life that surrounded him, but with scenes from the great masters of fiction, from Shakespeare and Cervantes, Addison and Molière, Swift, Sterne, Fielding and Smollett.

In 1821, Leslie was elected an Associate of the Royal Academy, and five years later full Royal Academician. In 1827 he was elected into the National Academy of Design as an Honorary Academician. In 1833, he left for America to become teacher of drawing in the military academy at West Point, but the post proved an irksome one, and in some six months he returned to England. He was elected as a member to the American Philosophical Society in 1837. He died 5 May 1859 in his home at Abercorn Place and is buried in Kensal Green Cemetery.

Leslie was the brother of American author Eliza Leslie and United States Army soldier Thomas Jefferson Leslie. In April 1825 he married Harriet Honor Stone with whom he had six children. Their second son Sir Bradford Leslie was a noted bridge builder, and their youngest son, George Dunlop Leslie RA (1835–1921) a notable artist. He is buried in Kensal Green Cemetery.

== Works ==
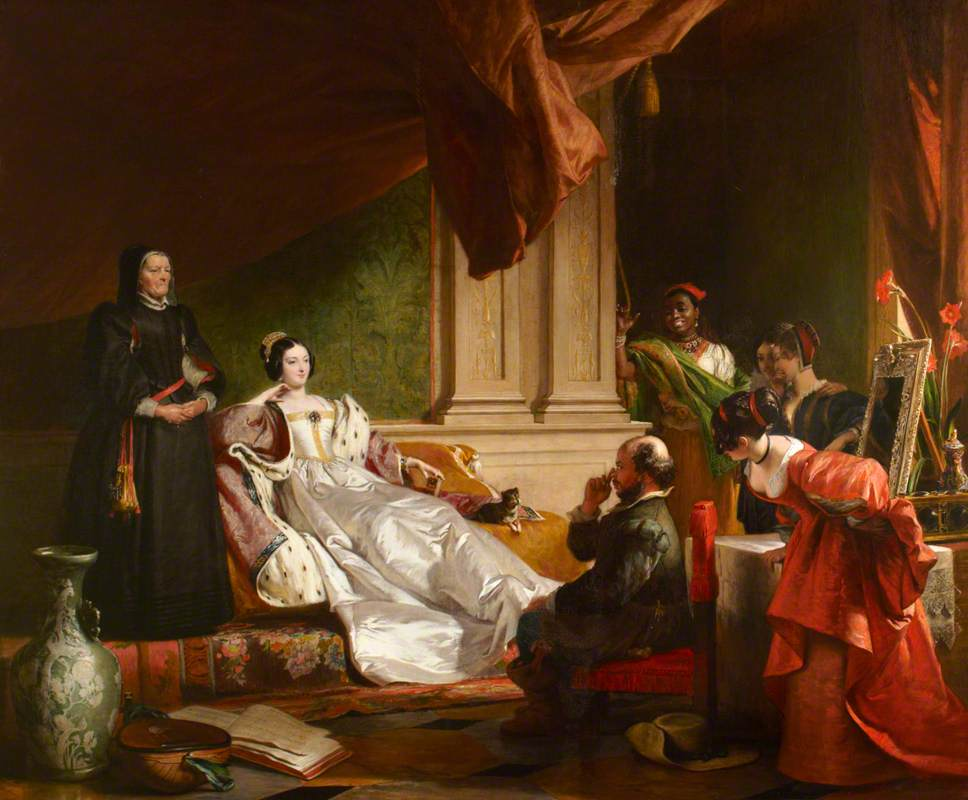
Sancho Panza and the Duchess, 1824

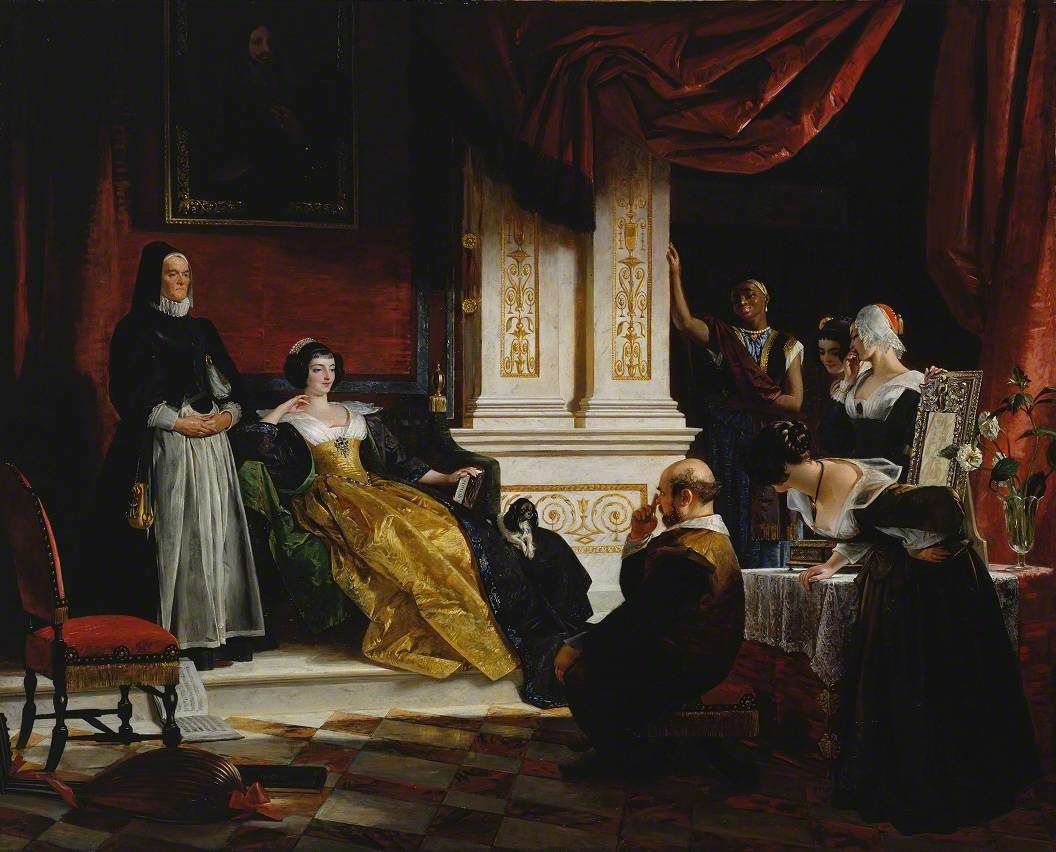
Sancho Panza in the Apartment of the Duchess, 1844/1845

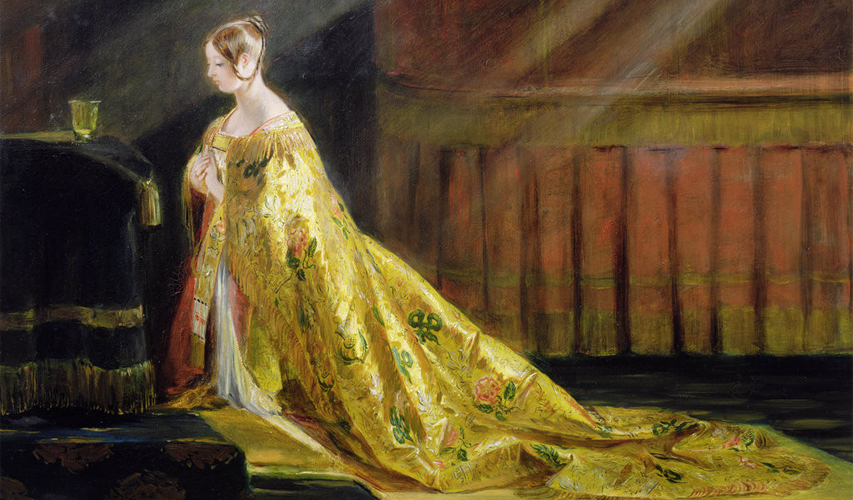
Queen Victoria, in Her Coronation Robes, 1838

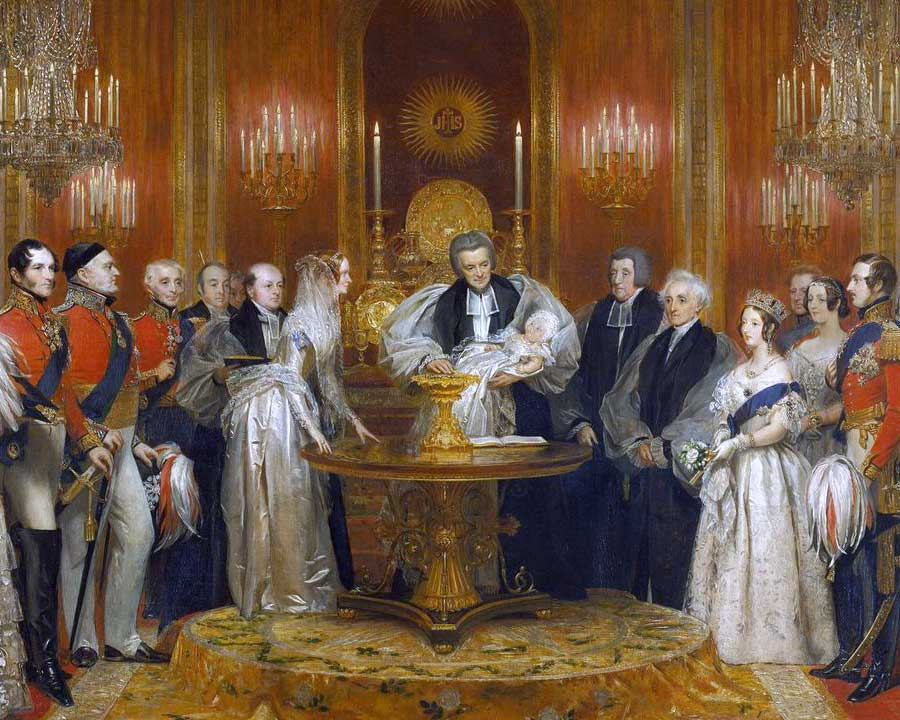
The Lily Font at the christening of Victoria, Princess Royal, 1841

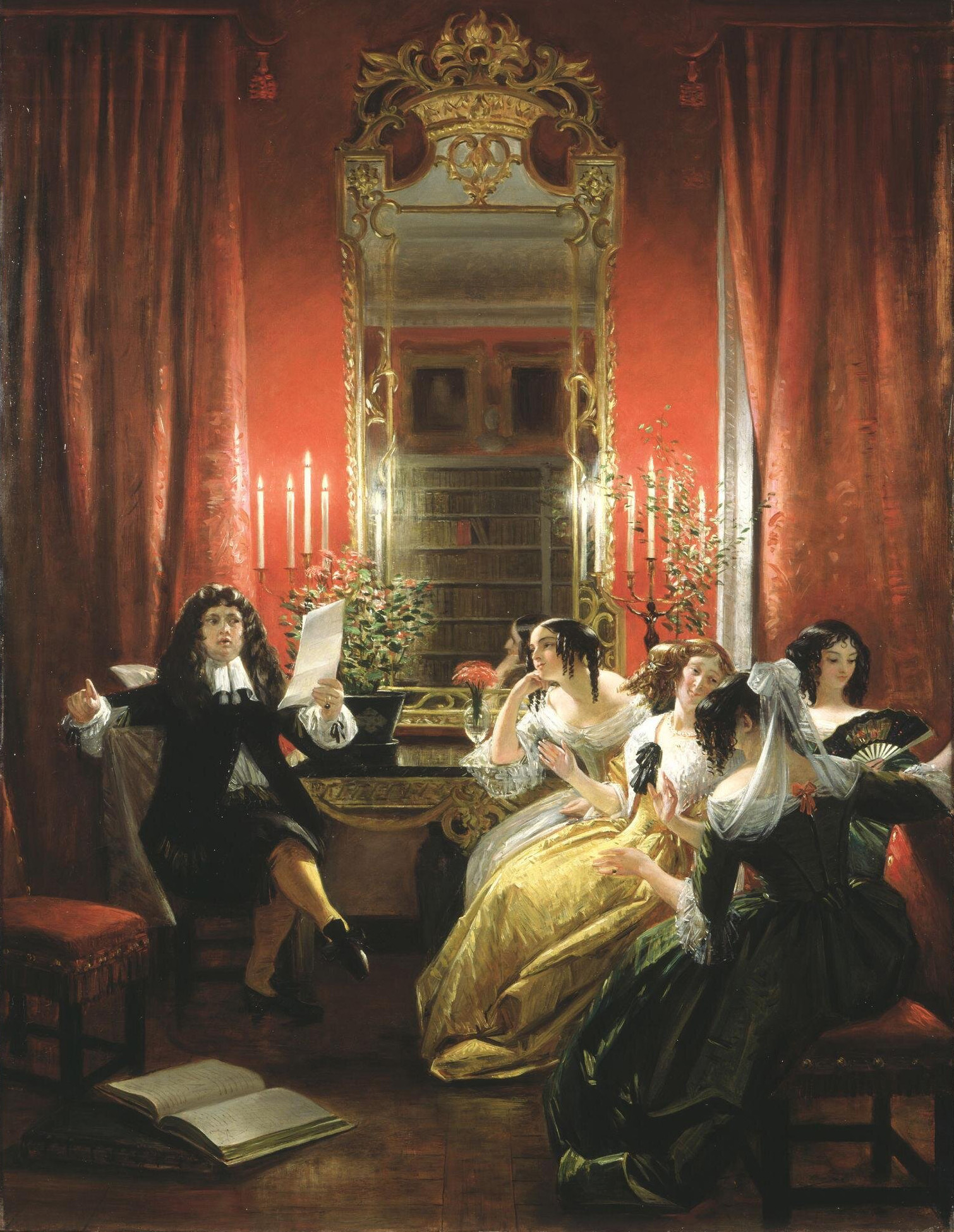
Les Femmes Savantes (1845), a scene from the Molière play. Victoria and Albert Museum, London.

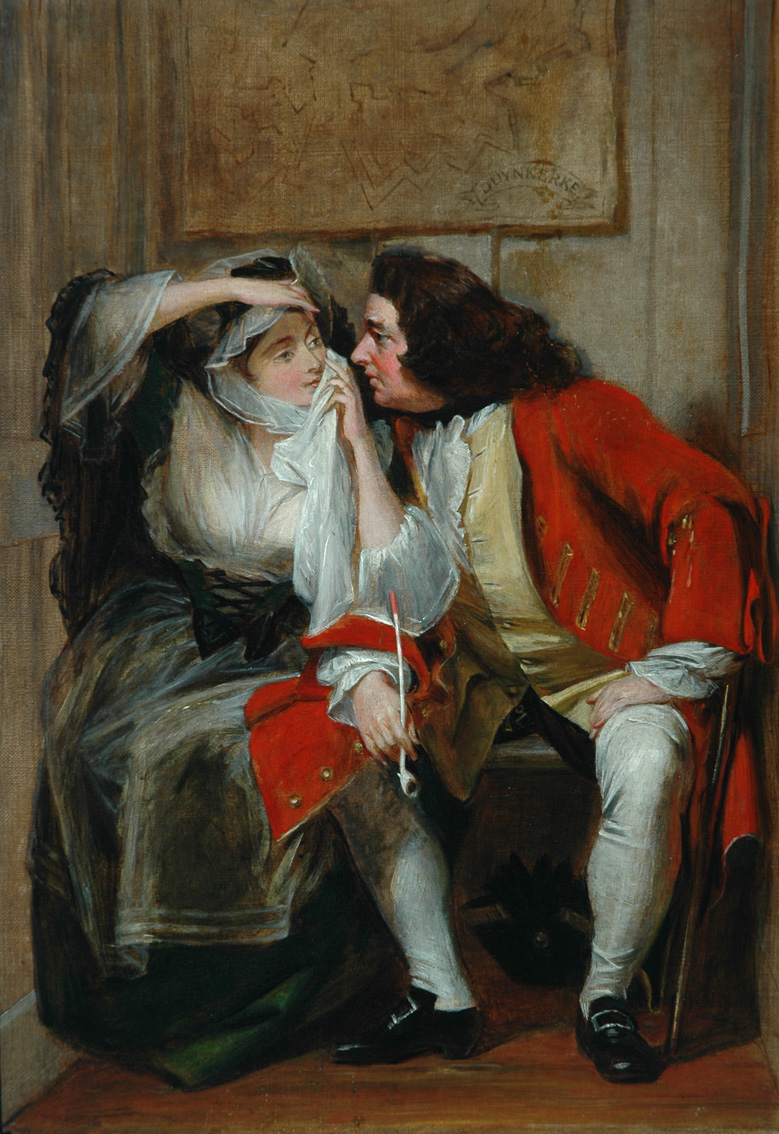
Uncle Toby and Widow Wadman from Laurence Sterne's The Life and Opinions of Tristram Shandy, Gentleman. In Shandy Hall, Coxwold, North Yorkshire.

Individual paintings of note include:

- Sir Roger de Coverley going to Church (1819)
- Londoners Gypsying (1820)
- May-day in the Time of Queen Elizabeth (1821)
- Portrait of a Gentleman (1823)
- Sancho Panza and the Duchess (1824)
- My Uncle Toby and the Widow Wadman (1831)
- Le Malade Imaginaire, act iii. sc. 6 (1843)
- Our Saviour Teaching his Disciples a Lesson Humility (1844)
- The Pharisee and the Publican (1847)
- The Reading Lesson from an Etching by Raffaelle (1848)
- Duke's Chaplain Enraged leaving the Table, from Don Quixote (1849)
- Martha and Mary (1849)
- The Mother's Return to her Child (1849)

Several works were commissioned and bought by James Lenox. Those works were on display in the Lenox Library, which upon demolition, were donated to the New York Public Library. Many of his more important subjects exist in varying replicas.

Leslie possessed a sympathetic imagination, which enabled him to enter freely into the spirit of the author whom he illustrated, a delicate perception for female beauty, an unfailing eye for character and its outward manifestation in face and figure, and a genial and sunny sense of humour, guided by an instinctive refinement which prevented it from overstepping the bounds of good taste.

Leslie earned a reputation for illustrating well-known works of literature: Ivanhoe, As You Like It, Tristram Shandy, Merry Wives of Windsor, Don Quixote, and several by Irving, among others. George Wyndham, 4th Earl of Egremont paid him 500 guineas in 1823 for the Quixote painting: Sancho Panza and the Duchess, which may be Leslie's most famous. Eleven of his paintings – many of them inspired by literature – were engraved and published in The Atlantic Souvenir and The Token annual American gift books in the 1820s and 30s, reaching a much wider audience. The works earned the praise of American critics William Dunlap and John Neal. The latter in The Yankee called Leslie "a master draughtsman, decidedly one of the two, or three best alive".

In addition to his skill as an artist, Leslie was a ready and pleasant writer. His Life of his friend Constable, the landscape painter, appeared in 1843 is regarded as one of the classics of artistic biography. He also wrote a Handbook for Young Painters, a volume embodying the substance of his lectures as professor of painting to the Royal Academy, in 1855. In 1860, Tom Taylor edited his Autobiography and Letters, which contain interesting reminiscences of his distinguished friends and contemporaries. Leslie's letters paint the man as affectionate, social, candid, modest and eager for instruction and improvement, always seeking the society of the best and most eminent of persons to whom he could gain access without intrusion or forwardness. Taylor also finished Leslie's Life and Times of Sir Joshua Reynolds, which was published in 1865.

The painting May-day in the Time of Queen Elizabeth is examined in Letitia Elizabeth Landon's poem On May Day, as part of her Poetical Catalogue of Paintings in The Literary Gazette (1823).

== Gallery ==
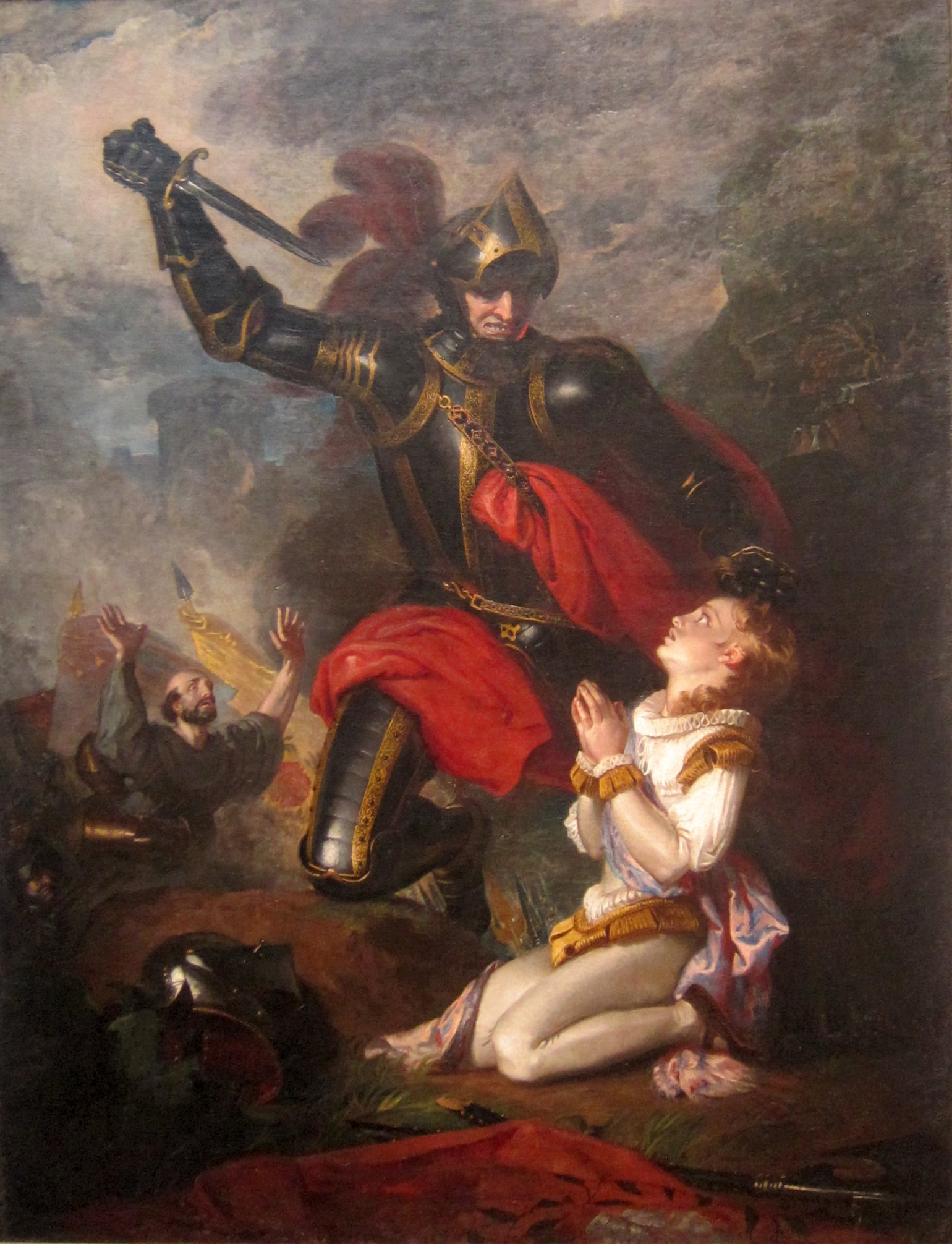
The Murder of Rutland by Lord Clifford, 1815

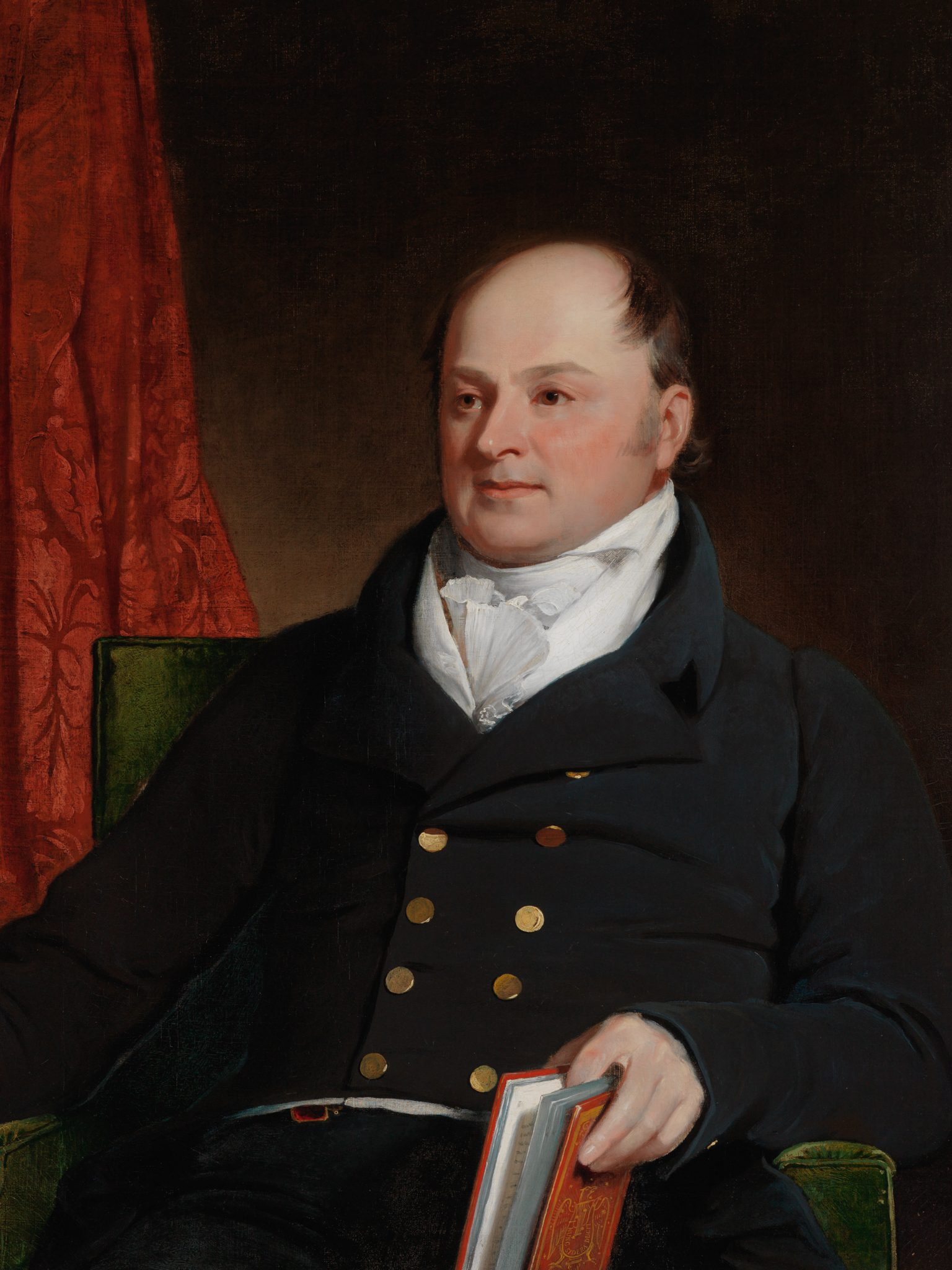
John Quincy Adams, 1816

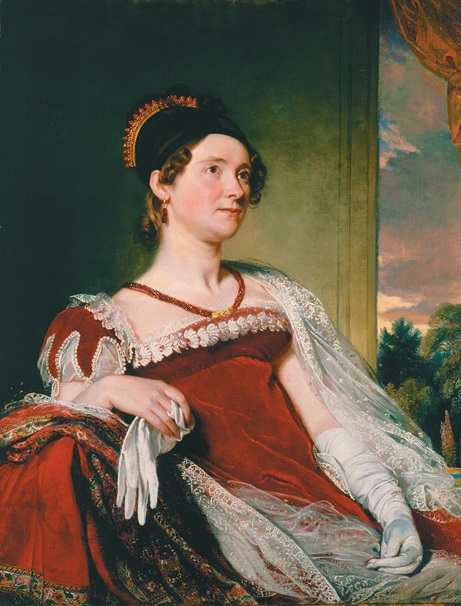
Louisa Adams, 1816

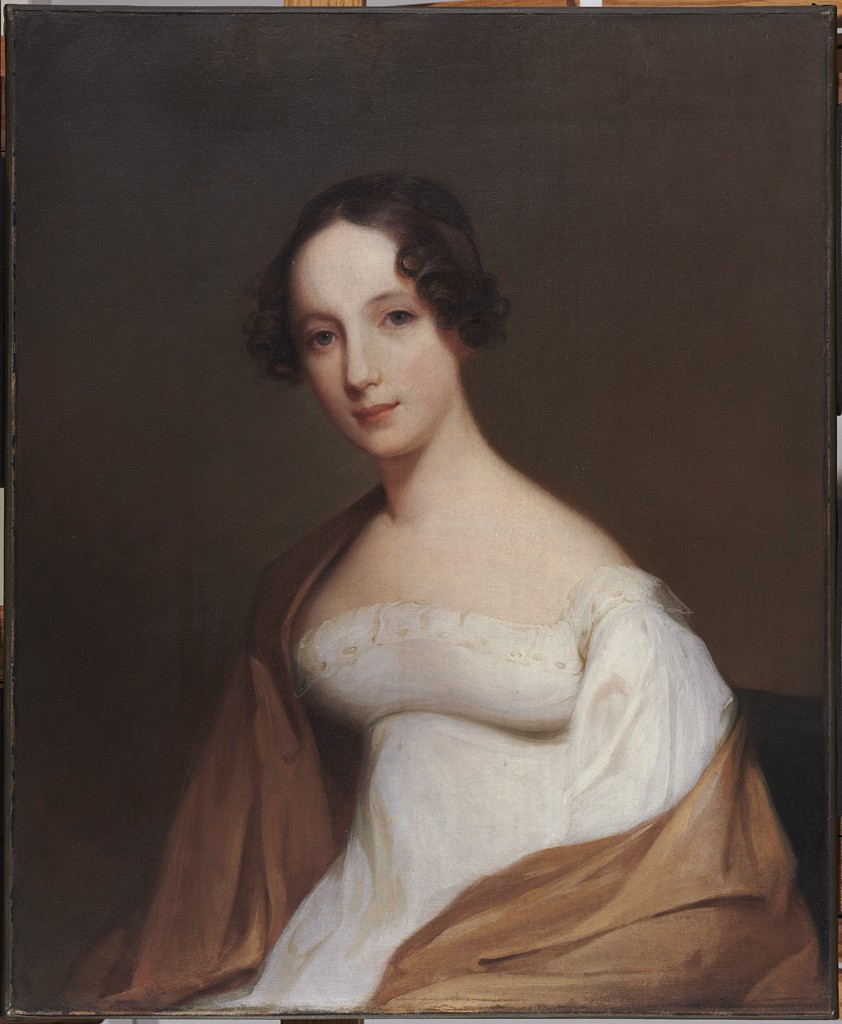
Sarah Cabot Parkman Atkinson, 1818

Londoners Gypsying, 1820

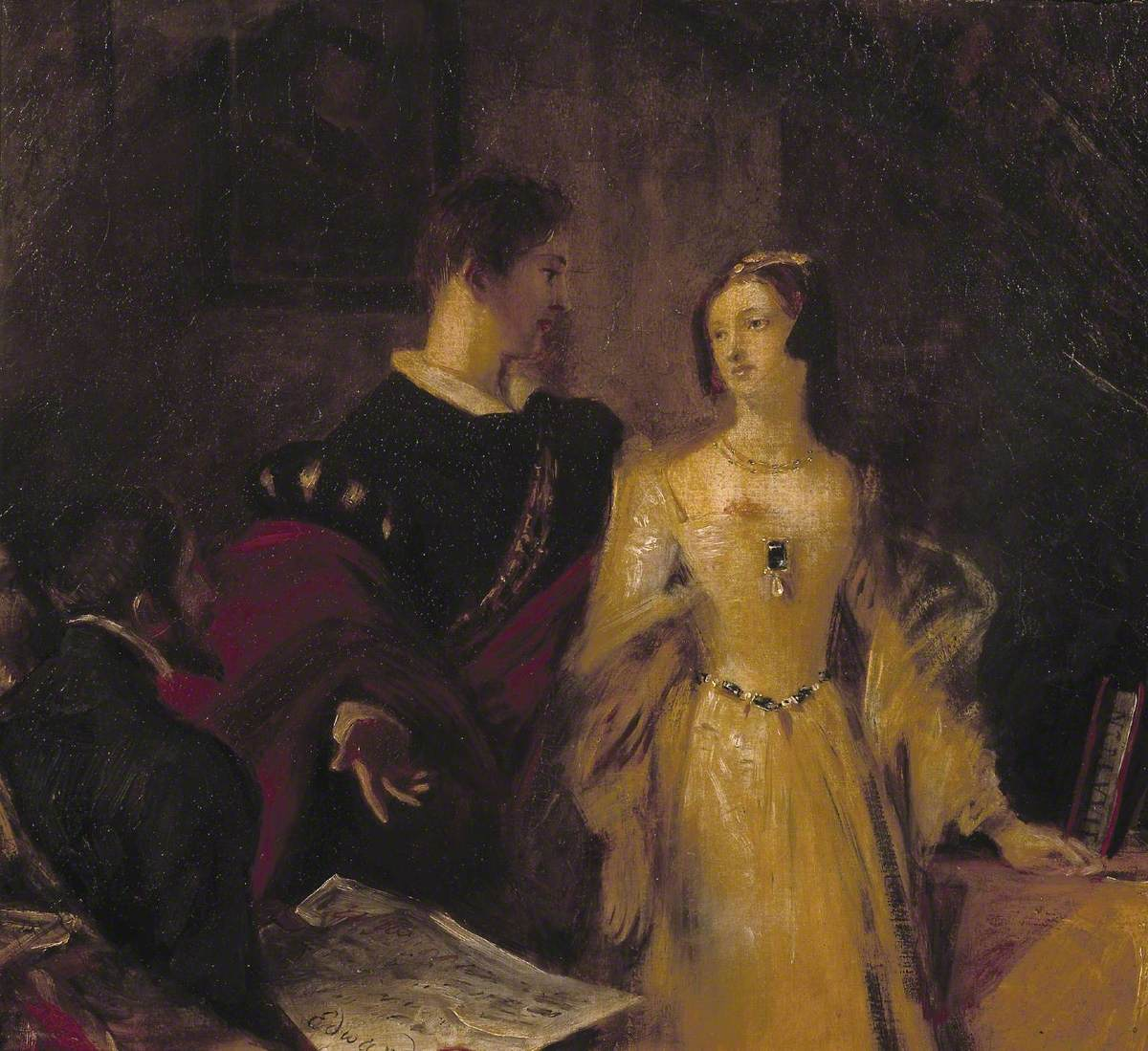
Lady Jane Grey Prevailed on to Accept the Crown, 1827

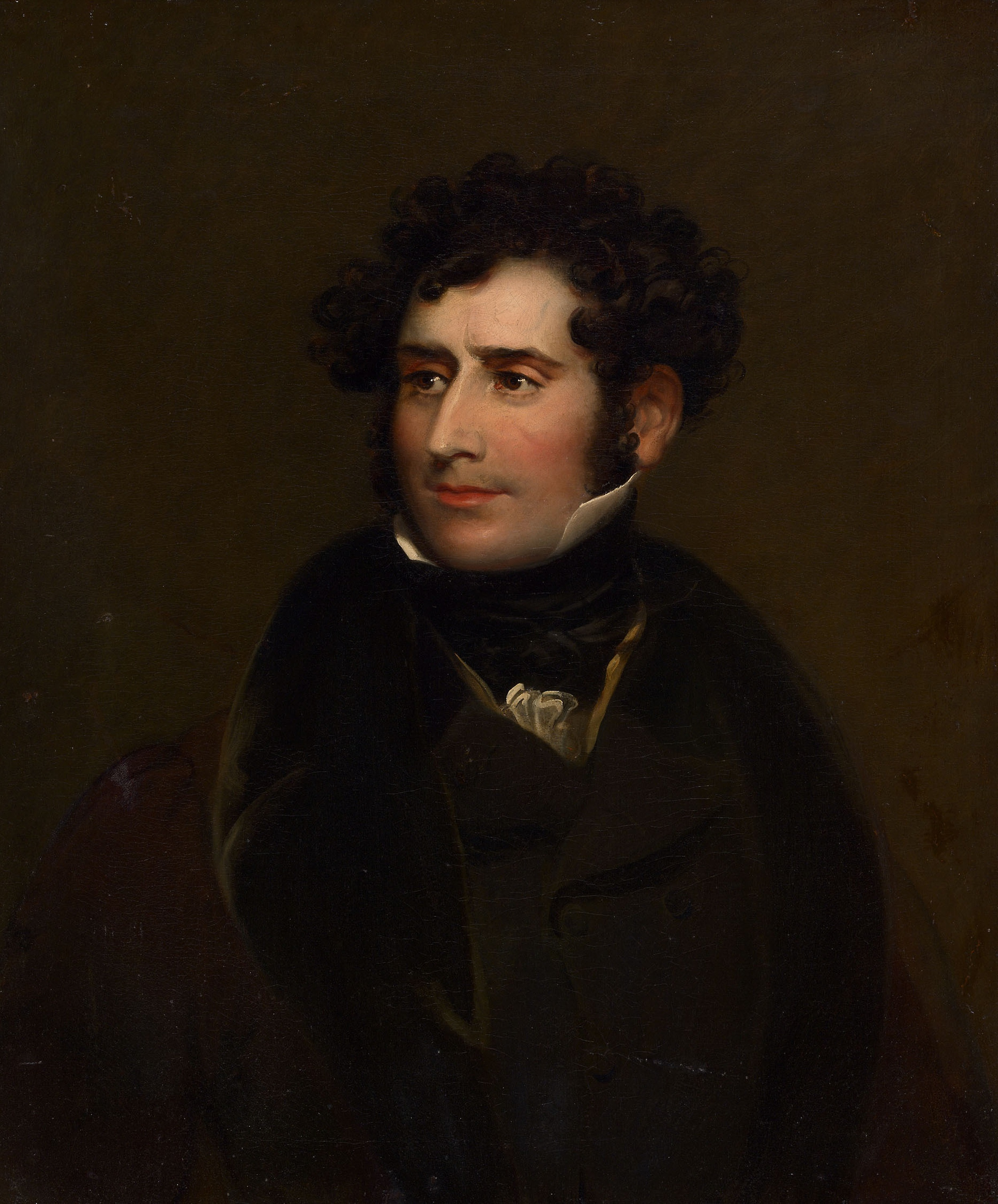
James William Wallack, c.1835

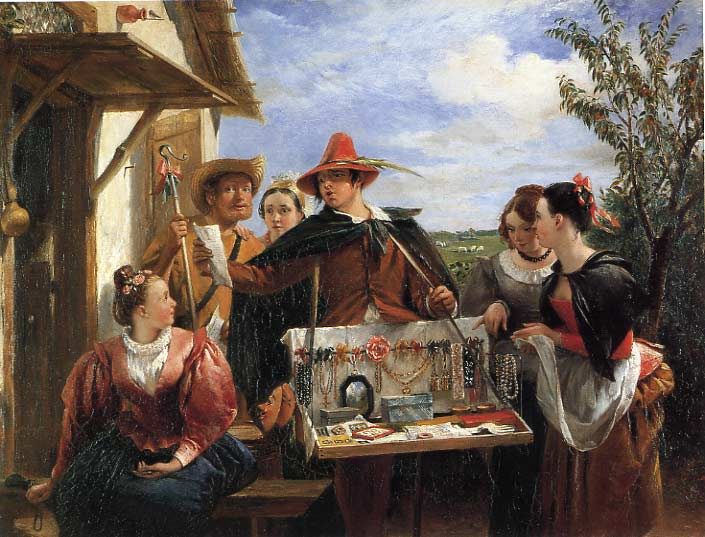
Autolycus, 1836

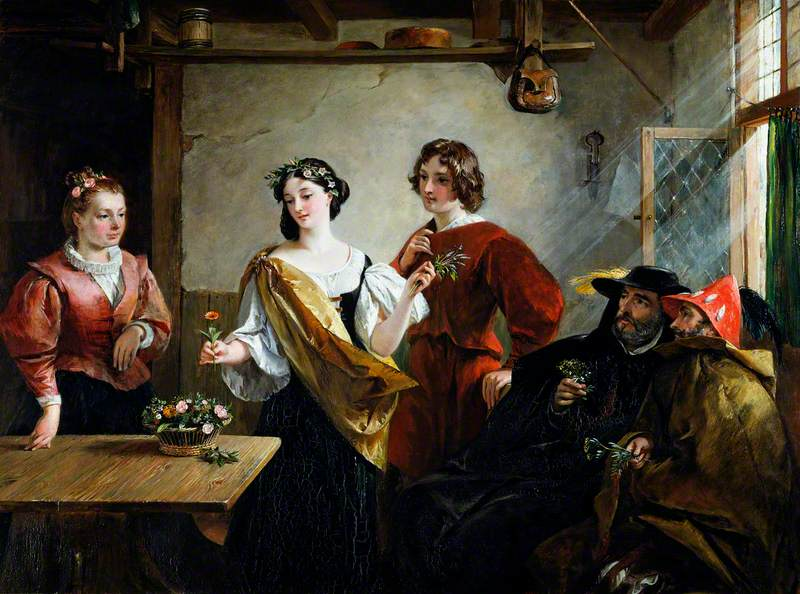
Florizel and Perdita, 1837

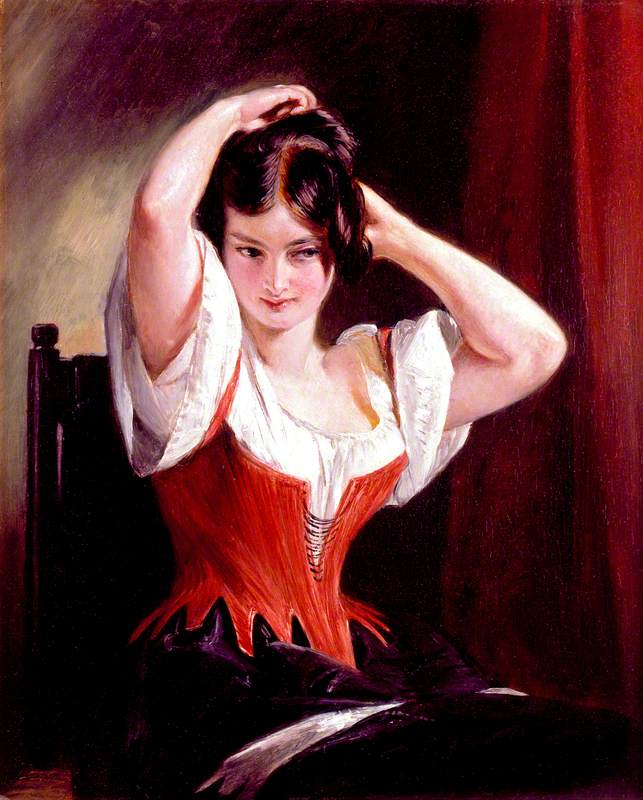
Dulcinea del Toboso, 1839

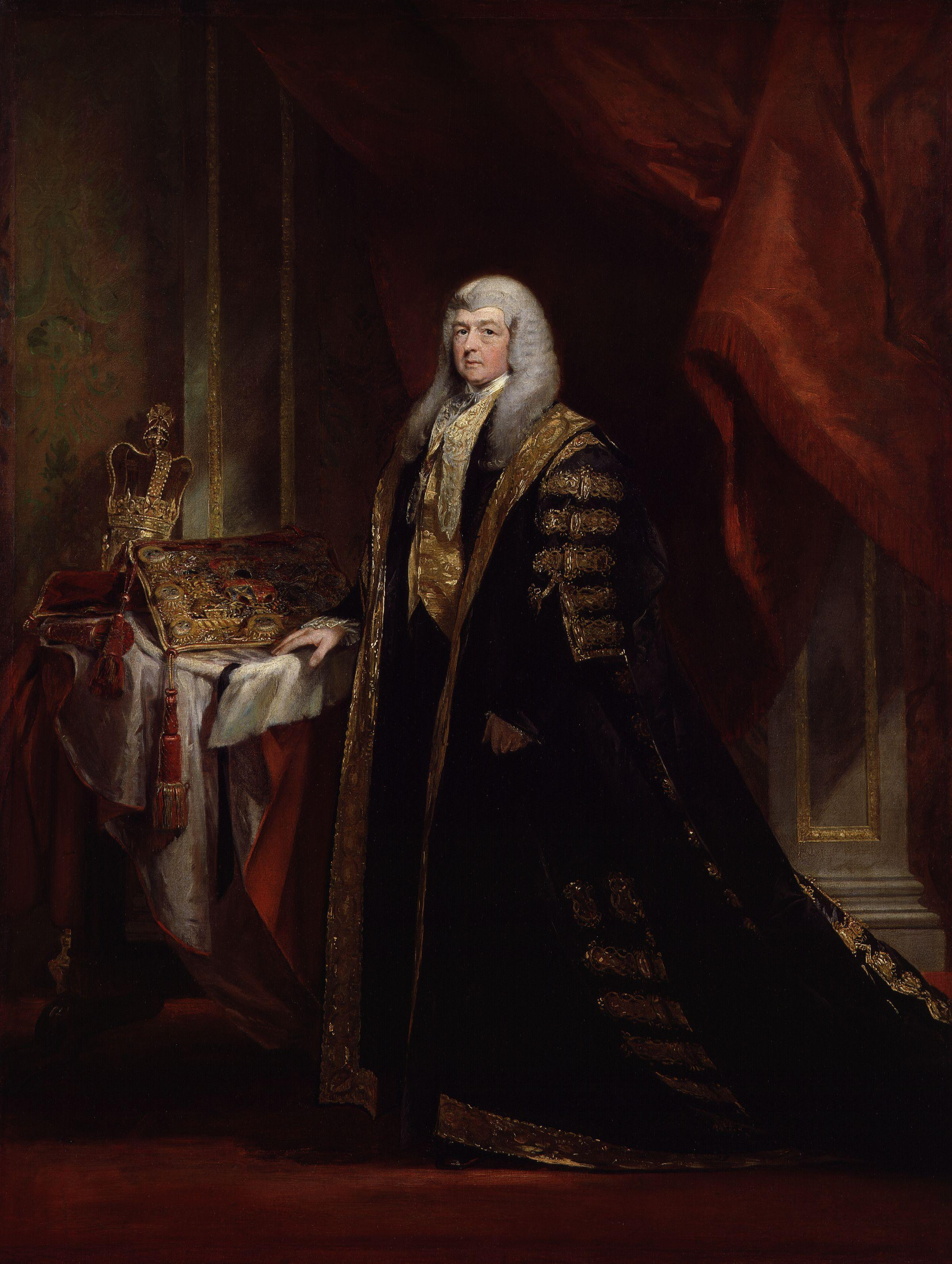
Lord Cottenham, 1840

Queen Katherine and Patience, 1842

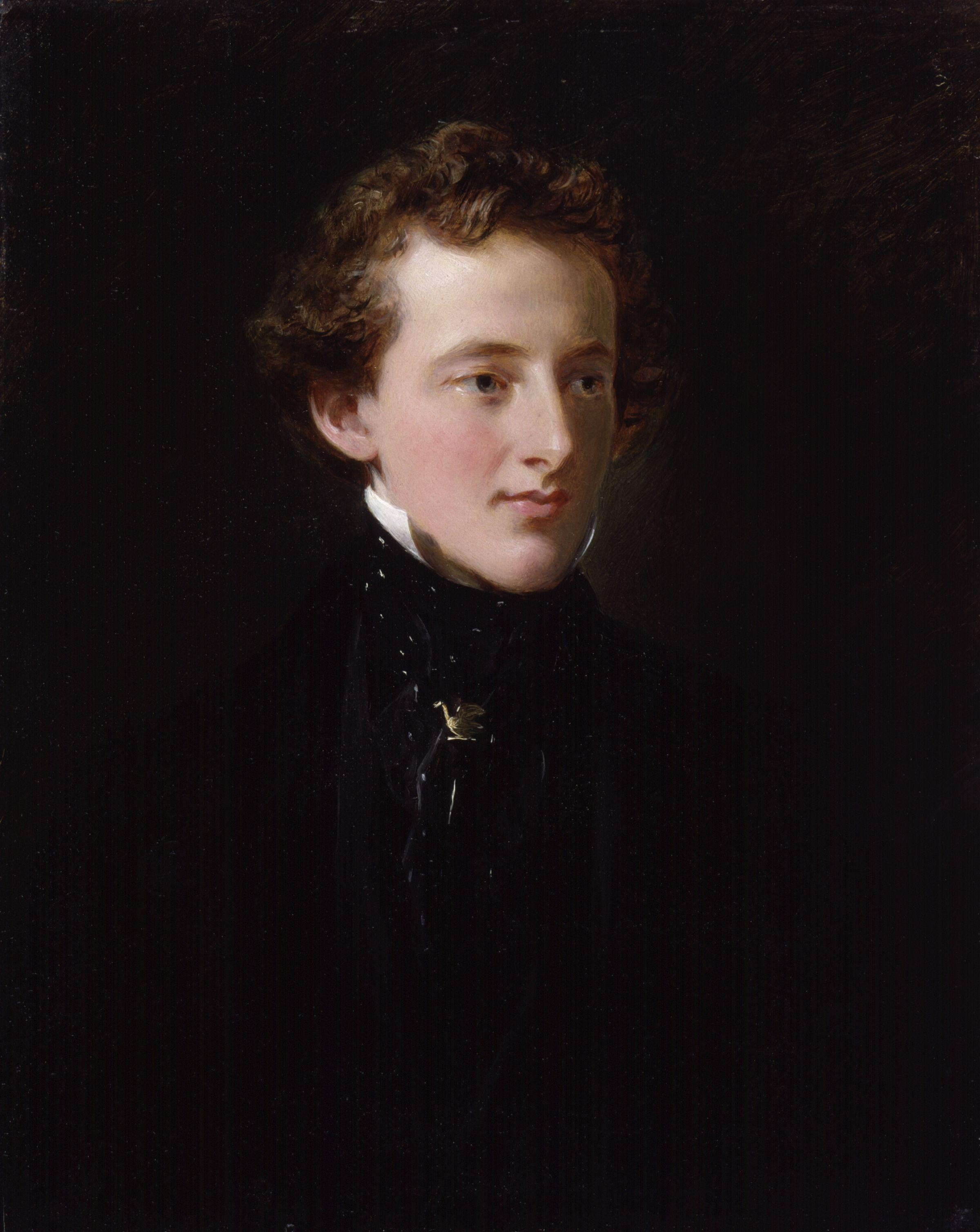
Portrait of John Everett Millais, 1852

== Writings ==
- Memoirs of the Life of John Constable, R.A., ed. C.R.Leslie 1843; Chapman & Hall, London 1896
- Life and Times of Sir Joshua Reynolds, with Notices of Some of his Contemporaries, ed. Tom Taylor, John Murray, London 1865
- Handbook for Young Painters (with illustrations), John Murray, London 1855
- Autobiographical Recollections of C. R. Leslie with Selections from his correspondence, ed. Tom Taylor, Ticknor & Fields, Boston 1860.
