= Avellaneda, Ávila =

Avellaneda
- municipality
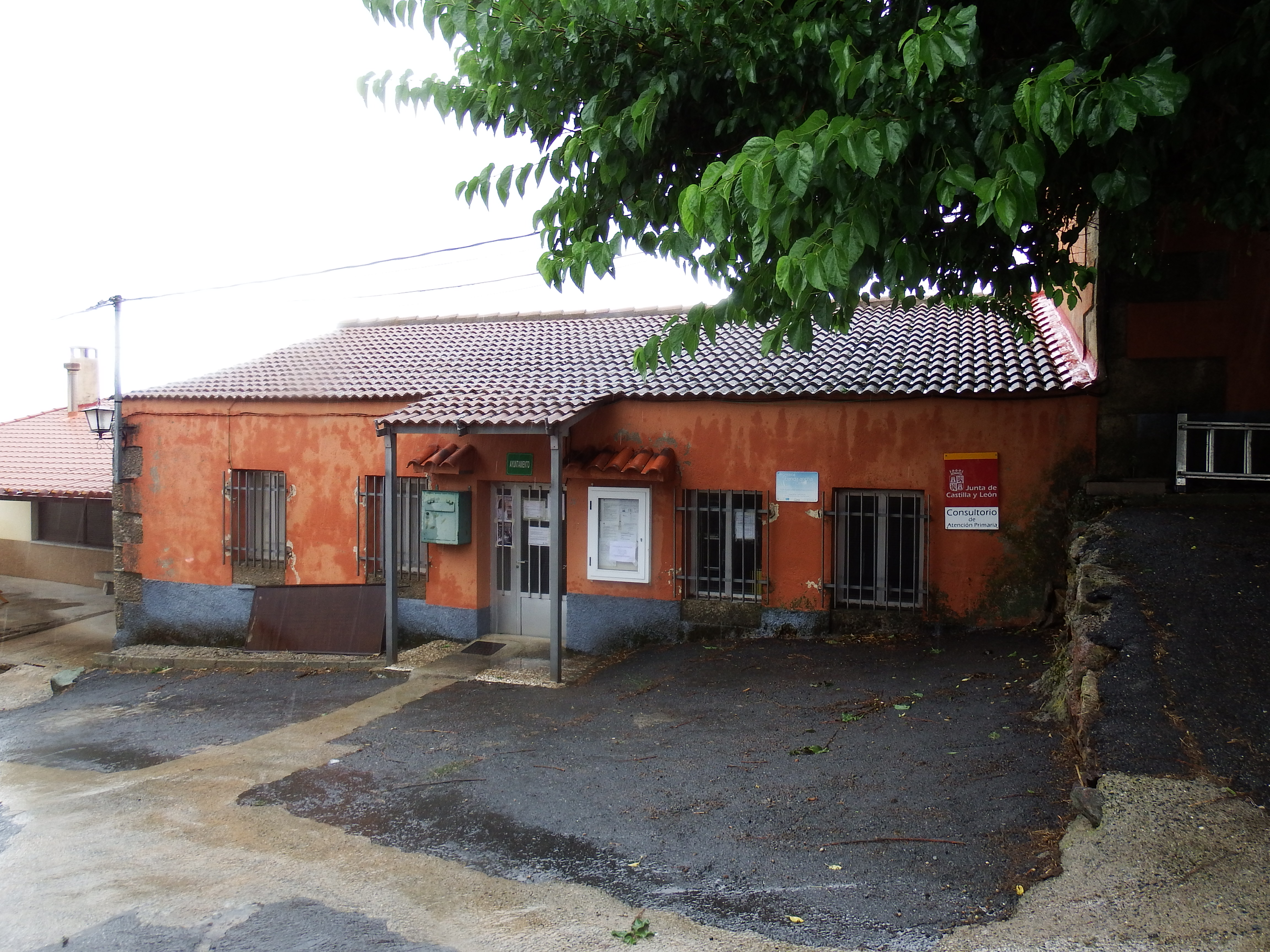
- Town hall

- Flag Coat of arms

- Location in Spain. Avellaneda (Spain)
- Coordinates: 40°23′19″N 5°23′17″W
- Country: Spain
- Autonomous community: Castile and León
- Province: Ávila
- Municipality: Avellaneda

Area
  - Total: 10.39 km^{2} (4.01 sq mi)
- Elevation: 1,353 m (4,439 ft)

Population (2025-01-01)
  - Total: 23
  - Density: 2.2/km^{2} (5.7/sq mi)
- Time zone: UTC+1 (CET)
  - Summer (DST): UTC+2 (CEST)
- Website: Official website

Avellaneda is a municipality of Spain in the province of Ávila, autonomous community of Castile and León. It is in the judicial district of Piedrahita.

Before the provincial reorganization in 1833, it was part of the province of Salamanca, like the rest of Alto Tormes.

As of 2016, the mayor was Vicente Martín Hernández.

== Population ==
Historical population
Year	Pop.	±% p.a.
2023	24	—
2024	23	−4.17%
2025	23	+0.00%
Source: INE
